= Fannin County Courthouse (Texas) =

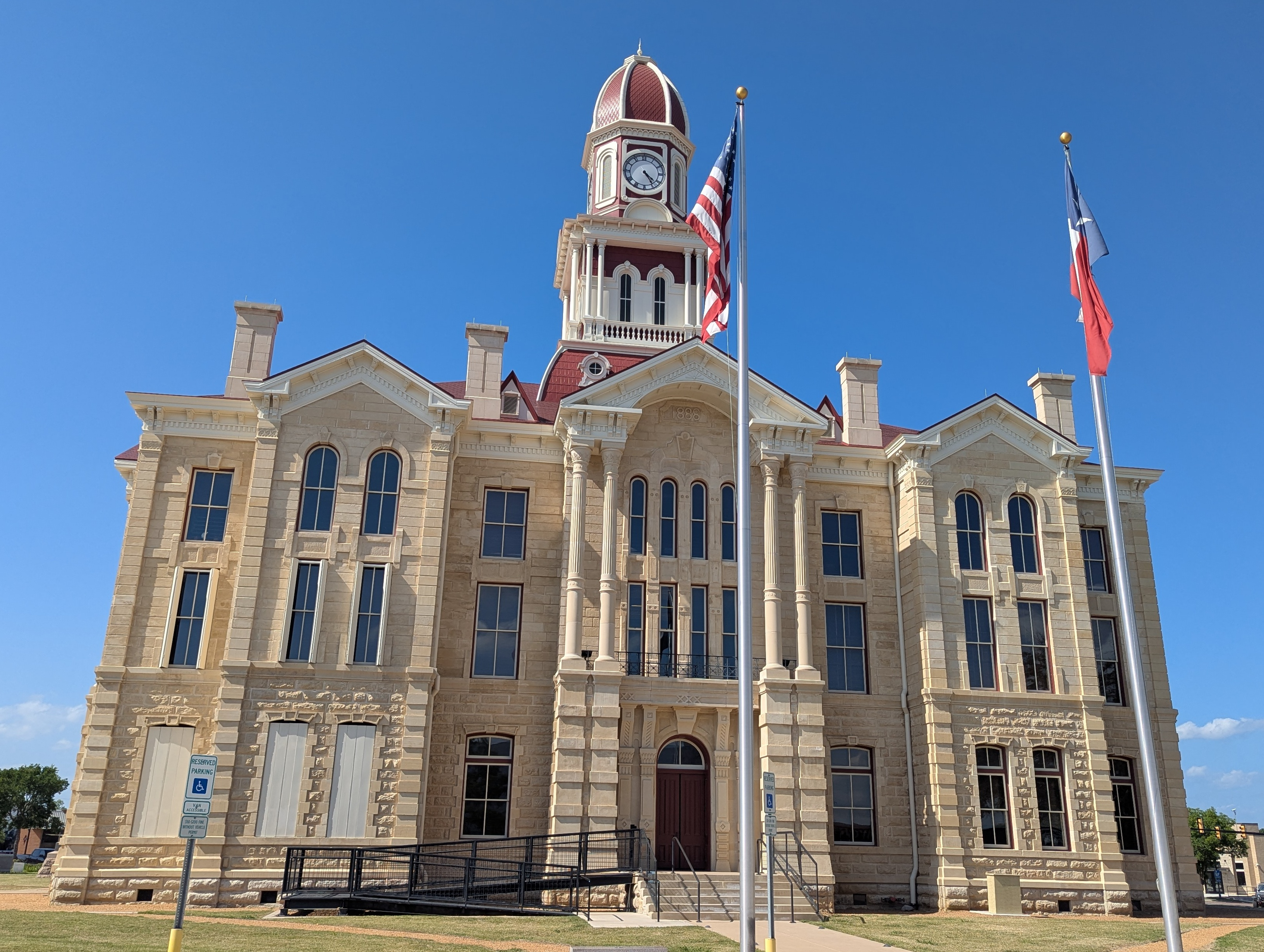
- Fannin County Courthouse in 2026
- Interactive map of the Fannin County Courthouse area

General information
- Architectural style: 1889 Second Empire; 1965 Modern Movement, Art Deco
- Location: Bonham, Texas, United States
- Coordinates: 33.5776°N 96.1787°W
- Construction started: 1888
- Completed: 1889, lost tower 1929 fire; massive renovation 1969, restoration complete 2022

Design and construction
- Architects: 1888 Wesley Clark Dodson (1829-1914) of Dodson & Dudley of Waco, TX; 1965, unknown

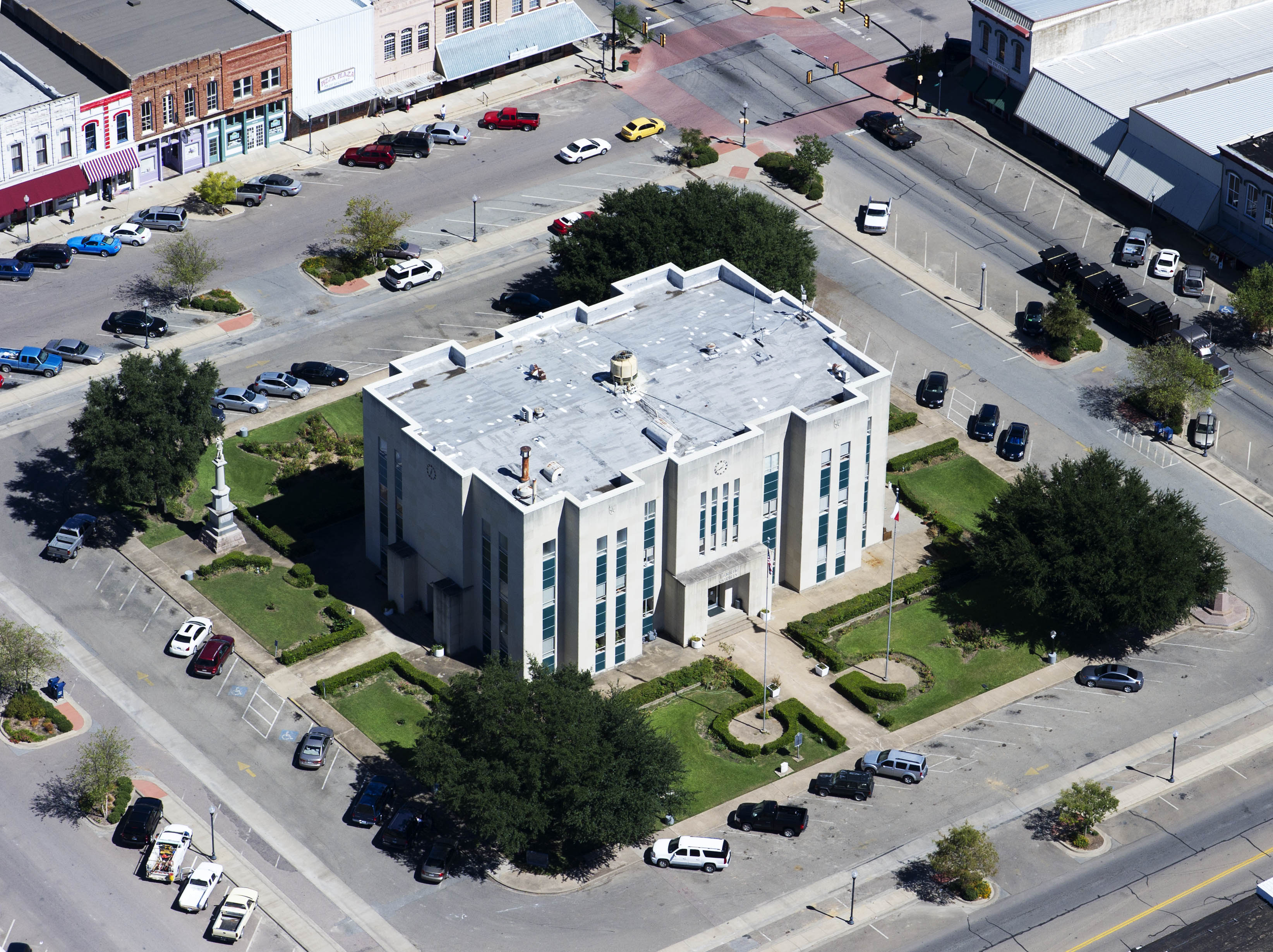
Aerial view of the Fannin County Courthouse prior to restoration

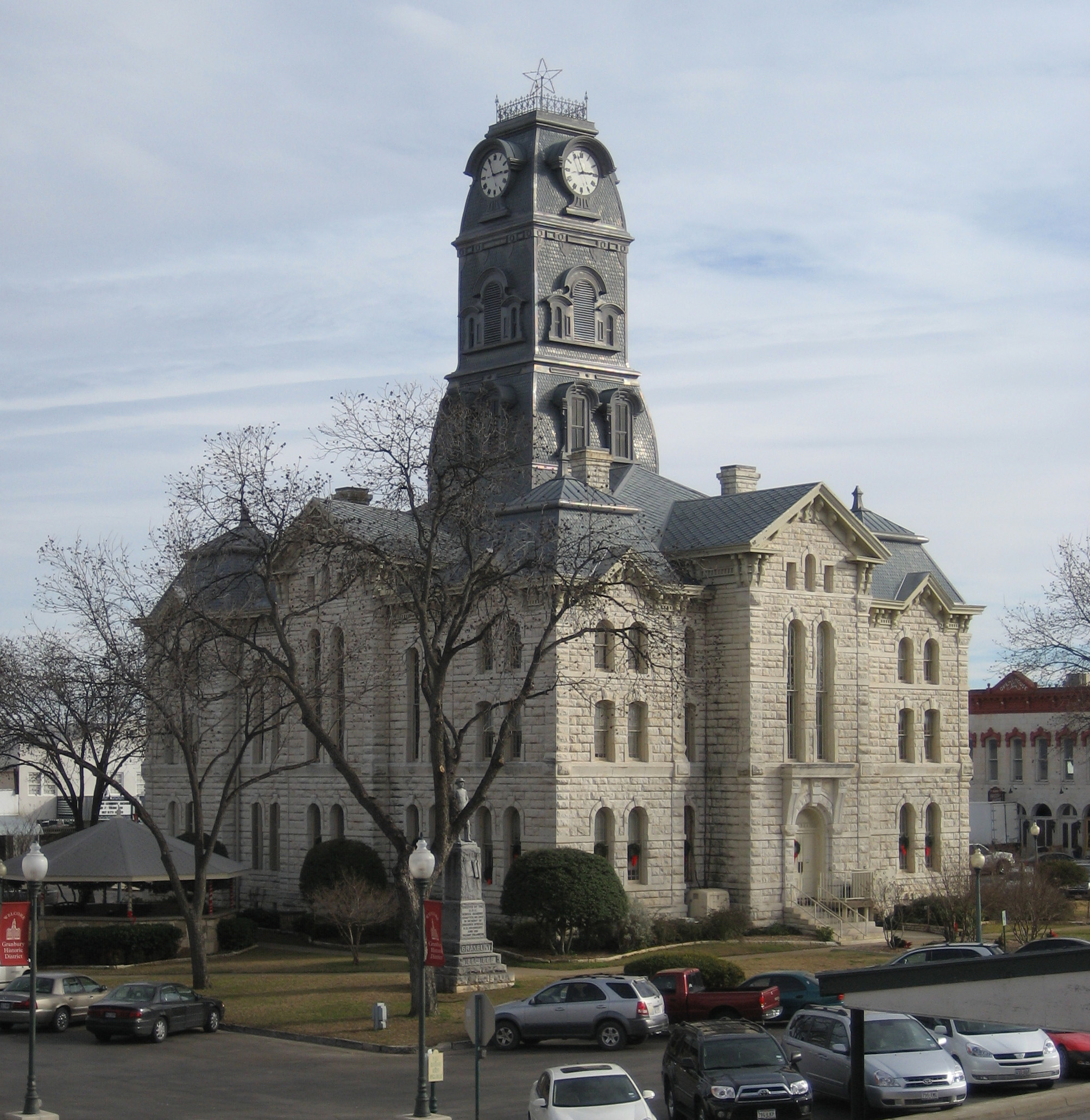
For comparison Hood County Courthouse in 2008

The Fannin County Courthouse is a historic courthouse building located in Bonham, Fannin County, Texas. Built in 1888-1889 of rough-cut local limestone from Gober by Scottish-born stonemasons Kane and Cormack, it was designed in the Second Empire style of architecture by Waco-based architect Wesley Clark Dodson (1829–1914) of the firm Dodson and Dudley. As built it was similar in appearance to the Hood County Courthouse Dodson designed shortly after it. Its central clock tower and elaborate mansard roof were destroyed by fire on New Year's Eve, December 31, 1929, and were replaced by a flat roof. In 1965 the courthouse was modernized, the remaining roof pediments were removed and the exterior was covered with a smooth surface of what is called Lueders stone or Lueders limestone, so that it appeared to be a Moderne or rather plain Art Deco building.

In 2008 the county received a state historical renovation grant and discussion ensued about whether to restore the building to its earlier grandeur.

On November 8, 2016, a courthouse restoration bond proposal was passed by Fannin County voters. This $12.5 million bond, in conjunction with a matching $5 million grant from the Texas Historical Commission, will restore the courthouse to its original 1888 design.

== See also ==
- List of county courthouses in Texas
