= Dodd City, Texas =

- Town
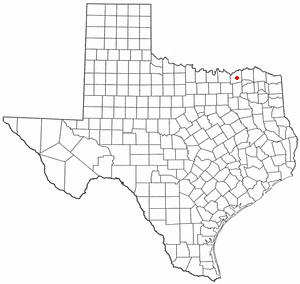
- Location of Dodd City, Texas

- Coordinates: 33°34′32″N 96°04′32″W
- Country: United States
- State: Texas
- County: Fannin

Area
  - Total: 1.77 sq mi (4.58 km^{2})
  - Land: 1.77 sq mi (4.58 km^{2})
  - Water: 0 sq mi (0.00 km^{2})
- Elevation: 673 ft (205 m)

Population (2020)
  - Total: 369
  - Density: 209/sq mi (80.6/km^{2})
- Time zone: UTC-6 (Central (CST))
  - Summer (DST): UTC-5 (CDT)
- ZIP code: 75438
- Area codes: 903, 430
- FIPS code: 48-20680
- GNIS feature ID: 2412436
- Website: cityofdoddcity.org

Dodd City is a town in Fannin County, in the U.S. state of Texas. The population was 369 at the 2020 census, representing no change from the 2010 census.

== History ==
The town was established in 1839.

== Geography ==
Dodd City is located east of the center of Fannin County. Texas State Highway 56 passes through the town center, leading east 4.5 miles (7.2 km) to Windom and west 6 miles (10 km) to Bonham, the county seat.

According to the United States Census Bureau, Dodd City has a total area of 1.8 square miles (4.6 km^{2}), all land.

== Demographics ==
Historical population
Census	Pop.	Note	%±
1890	333		—
1900	369		10.8%
1910	289		−21.7%
1920	495		71.3%
1930	370		−25.3%
1940	308		−16.8%
1950	329		6.8%
1960	239		−27.4%
1970	302		26.4%
1980	286		−5.3%
1990	350		22.4%
2000	419		19.7%
2010	369		−11.9%
2020	369		0.0%
U.S. Decennial Census; 2020 Census

As of the census of 2000, there were 419 people, 160 households, and 120 families residing in the town. The population density was 247.5 inhabitants per square mile (95.6/km^{2}). There were 188 housing units at an average density of 111.1 per square mile (42.9/km^{2}). The racial makeup of the town was 95.94% White, 1.43% African American, 0.72% Native American, 0.24% from other races, and 1.67% from two or more races. Hispanic or Latino of any race were 0.24% of the population.

There were 160 households, out of which 35.6% had children under the age of 18 living with them, 59.4% were married couples living together, 8.1% had a female householder with no husband present, and 25.0% were non-families. 22.5% of all households were made up of individuals, and 10.6% had someone living alone who was 65 years of age or older. The average household size was 2.62 and the average family size was 3.05.

In the town, the population was spread out, with 28.6% under the age of 18, 7.2% from 18 to 24, 28.6% from 25 to 44, 21.0% from 45 to 64, and 14.6% who were 65 years of age or older. The median age was 34 years. For every 100 females, there were 109.5 males. For every 100 females age 18 and over, there were 110.6 males.

The median income for a household in the town was $35,313, and the median income for a family was $45,972. Males had a median income of $38,750 versus $22,500 for females. The per capita income for the town was $21,873. About 10.4% of families and 15.9% of the population were below the poverty line, including 20.0% of those under age 18 and 10.0% of those age 65 or over.

== Education ==
Dodd City is served by the Dodd City Independent School District and is home to the Dodd City High School Hornets, 2021 Texas State Class 1A champions in Girls Basketball and Softball.
