= John Underwood (American football) =

American football player (1901–1932)

No. 20
- Position: Guard

Personal information
- Born: March 27, 1901; Honey Grove, Texas, U.S.
- Died: December 15, 1932 (aged 31); Bonham, Texas, U.S.
- Listed height: 6 ft 3 in (1.91 m)
- Listed weight: 265 lb (120 kg)

Career information
- High school: Honey Grove (Texas)
- College: Rice (1918–1921)

Career history
- Milwaukee Badgers (1923)
- Stats at Pro Football Reference

John Arthur "Big Heavy" Underwood Jr. (March 27, 1901 – December 15, 1932) was an American professional football guard who played one season with the Milwaukee Badgers of the National Football League (NFL). He played college football at Rice University.

== Early life and college ==
John Arthur Underwood Jr. was born on March 27, 1901, in Honey Grove, Texas. He attended Honey Grove High School in Honey Grove.

Underwood was a four-year letterman for the Rice Owls of Rice Institute from 1918 to 1921. He was inducted into the Rice Athletics Hall of Fame in 1971.

== Professional career ==
Underwood signed with the Milwaukee Badgers of the National Football League (NFL) in 1923 and started all 12 games for the team during the 1923 NFL season. He played both offense and defense as a two-way guard for the Badgers. He was listed at 6'3", 265 pounds. (Note: Pro Football Archives lists him at 6'7".) The Badgers finished third in the league that year with a 7–2–3 record.

== Personal life ==
Underwood died on December 15, 1932 in Bonham, Texas.

== See also ==
- List of Milwaukee Badgers players
