= Tulip, Texas =

Tulip
- Unincorporated community
- Interactive map of Tulip
- Location within Texas Tulip (the United States)
- Coordinates: 33°48′29″N 96°7′53″W
- Country: United States
- State: Texas
- County: Fannin County

Tulip is an unincorporated community located along Farm Road 2554 in Fannin County, Texas, United States.

== History ==
The community was established in March 1836 as Fannin county's first county seat as well as the first permanent settlement of Fannin county with the name 'Lexington' by Daniel Rowlett from Kentucky, John and Edward Stephens from Alabama, David Slack from Mississippi, Richard Locke from Tennessee, as well as other settlers. A post office then opened in that community in 1839. Its name changed to Tulip when Old Warren became the county seat in 1840, the new etymology which came from its location along the Tulip Bend of the Red River. A post office in the community was opened in 1875. By the 1880s, the community had several amenities such as a school, a Methodist church, a general store, a sawmill, a gristmill, a cotton gin, and a liquor store. In 1900, the community had a population of 65 and the school closed. In 1909, the communal post office closed. As of 2002, the community had a population of 48 people.
