= Hilger =

Hilger may refer to the following articles

Places

- Hilger, Montana, an unincorporated community in Fergus County, Montana, United States
- Hilger, Texas an unincorporated community in Fannin County, Texas

People with last name Hilger

- Ernst Hilger (1950–2025), Austrian gallery owner and art dealer
- Joseph Hilger (1903–1990), Luxembourgish sprinter and long jumper
- Sister Marie Inez Hilger (1891–1977), American Benedictine nun and anthropologist
- Mary Irma Hilger (1917–2003), American nun and nurse
- Matthew Hilger, American professional poker player and author
- Rusty Hilger (1962–2019), American football player
- Susanne Hilger (born 1958), German swimmer
- Vera Hilger (born 1971), German painter
