= Trenton High School (Texas) =

Location
- 2289 FM 815; Trenton, Texas 75490; United States; 33.410458°N 96.336644°W

Information
- School type: Public high school
- School district: Trenton Independent School District
- Principal: Steven Foster
- Teaching staff: 16.57 (FTE)
- Grades: 9-12
- Enrollment: 203 (2023-2024)
- Student to teacher ratio: 12.25
- Colors: Red, Black & White
- Athletics conference: UIL Class AA
- Mascot: Tigers
- Website: Official website

Trenton High School is a 2A public high school located in Trenton, Texas (USA). It is part of the Trenton Independent School District located in southwest Fannin County. In 2017, the school was rated as "Met Standard" by the Texas Education Agency.

== Athletics ==
The Trenton Tigers compete in the following sports:

- Baseball
- Basketball
- Cross Country
- Football
- Golf
- Softball
- Tennis
- Track and Field
- Volleyball

=== State Titles ===
- Boys Cross Country -
  - 1999(1A)
- BEST Robotics -
  - 2017(2A)
  - 2019(2A)
  - 2021(2A)
