= Dial, Fannin County, Texas =

Dial
- Unincorporated Community
- Interactive map of Dial
- Location within Texas Dial (the United States)
- Coordinates: 33°29′47″N 95°52′5″W
- Country: United States
- State: Texas
- County: Fannin County
- Elevation: 568 ft (173 m)

Dial is an unincorporated community located along Farm Road 824 in southeastern Fannin County, Texas, United States.

== History ==
The area of the community was settled in 1837 as a sanctuary for 25 to 30 families with the name Bethel, which got its name after one-room Bethel school that was established in the area in the same year. The oldest surviving church in Fannin County, the Bethel Presbyterian Church, was then established in this community in 1846 near the Bethel school. In 1880, another school called Lane's Academy was established by Robert W. Lane, and the community would later be named Lane, after the school.

When the community acquired its own post office on May 24, 1880, the community's name was changed to Dial after the Dial family who owned the community cotton gin and grist mill. In the 1890s, Lane's Academy would change its name to Dial School.

A communal cemetery located in the south of the Presbyterian Church was built in 1900 and would then be rebuilt in 1925. From 1903 to 1905, Sam Rayburn taught in Dial School. The community post office closed in 1905, and the Dial School would close in 1948.

At the end of the 19th as well as thorough the 20th century, the population of Dial never exceeded 100; the population was estimated to be 75 in 1890, then dropped to 29 in the 1930s, but then rose up again to 76 thorough from the mid-1970s to 2000.
