= Duplex, Texas =

- Unincorporated community
- Location within Texas Location within the United States
- Coordinates: 33°46′40″N 96°08′21″W
- Country: United States
- State: Texas
- County: Fannin
- Elevation: 564 ft (172 m)
- Time zone: UTC-6 (Central (CST))
  - Summer (DST): UTC-5 (CDT)
- Area codes: 430 & 903
- GNIS feature ID: 1379688

Duplex is an unincorporated community in Fannin County, Texas, United States, located on Farm to Market Road 273, 15 miles (24 km) north of Bonham. Duplex was founded in the 1880s and named for two families who had settled the area in the 1850s. The community had a post office from 1899 to 1909; it also had two segregated schools. As of 2000, Duplex had a population of 25.
