= Windom, Texas =

- Town
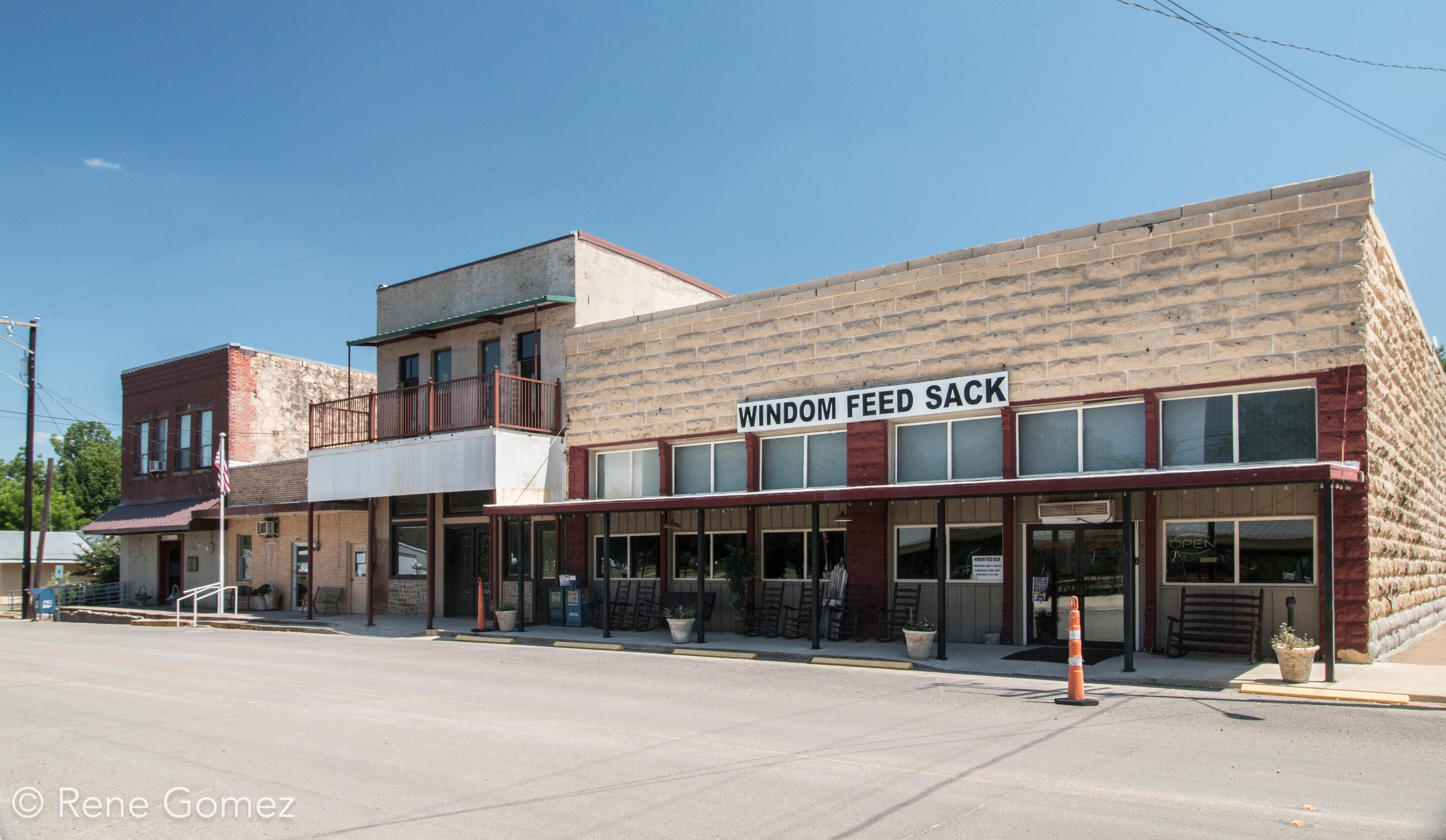

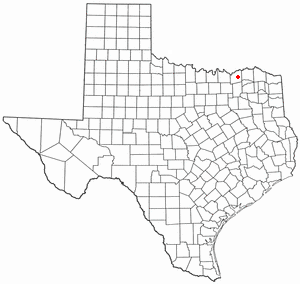
- Location of Windom, Texas

- Coordinates: 33°33′54″N 96°00′02″W
- Country: United States
- State: Texas
- County: Fannin

Area
  - Total: 0.55 sq mi (1.43 km^{2})
  - Land: 0.55 sq mi (1.43 km^{2})
  - Water: 0 sq mi (0.00 km^{2})
- Elevation: 696 ft (212 m)

Population (2020)
  - Total: 189
  - Density: 342/sq mi (132/km^{2})
- Time zone: UTC-6 (Central (CST))
  - Summer (DST): UTC-5 (CDT)
- ZIP code: 75492
- Area codes: 903, 430
- FIPS code: 48-79684
- GNIS feature ID: 2413494
- Website: www.townofwindomtexas.org

Windom is a town in Fannin County, Texas, United States. The population was 189 at the 2020 census, down from 199 at the 2010 census.

== Geography ==
Windom is located in eastern Fannin County. Texas State Highway 56 runs through the town, leading east 5 miles (8 km) to Honey Grove and west 10 miles (16 km) to Bonham, the county seat.

According to the United States Census Bureau, Windom has a total area of 0.54 square miles (1.4 km^{2}), all land.

== Demographics ==
Historical population
Census	Pop.	Note	%±
1920	389		—
1930	317		−18.5%
1940	290		−8.5%
1950	297		2.4%
1960	218		−26.6%
1970	247		13.3%
1980	276		11.7%
1990	269		−2.5%
2000	245		−8.9%
2010	199		−18.8%
2020	189		−5.0%
U.S. Decennial Census; 2020 Census

As of the census of 2000, 245 people, 97 households, and 71 families were residing in the town. The population density was 446.6 inhabitants per square mile (172.4/km^{2}). The 111 housing units averaged 202.3 per square mile (77.9/km^{2}). The racial makeup of the town was 91.43% White, 6.12% African American, 1.22% Native American, and 1.22% from two or more races.

Of the 97 households, 33.0% had children under the age of 18 living with them, 61.9% were married couples living together, 7.2% had a female householder with no husband present, and 26.8% were not families. About 25.8% of all households were made up of individuals, and 19.6% had someone living alone who was 65 years of age or older. The average household size was 2.53, and the average family size was 3.03.

In the town, the population was distributed as 24.5% under the age of 18, 8.2% from 18 to 24, 24.9% from 25 to 44, 23.7% from 45 to 64, and 18.8% who were 65 years of age or older. The median age was 41 years. For every 100 females, there were 85.6 males. For every 100 females age 18 and over, there were 85.0 males.

The median income for a household in the town was $44,375, and for a family was $50,781. Males had a median income of $31,875 versus $32,500 for females. The per capita income for the town was $17,779. About 5.8% of families and 10.1% of the population were below the poverty line, including 9.7% of those under the age of eighteen and 20.0% of those sixty five or over.

The Hindu-Jain spiritual retreat in Windom is called Siddhayatan.

== Education ==
Windom is served by the Honey Grove Independent School District. On July 1, 1987, Windom Independent School District merged into Honey Grove ISD. Windom's school closed in the late 1980s due to declining enrollment.

== See also ==
- List of municipalities in Texas
