= Durwood Keeton =

American football player (born 1952)

No. 20, 29
- Position: Defensive back

Personal information
- Born: August 14, 1952 (age 74); Bonham, Texas, U.S.
- Listed height: 5 ft 11 in (1.80 m)
- Listed weight: 178 lb (81 kg)

Career information
- High school: Bonham (Texas)
- College: Oklahoma
- NFL draft: 1974: 4th round, 85th overall pick

Career history
- Southern California Sun (1974); New England Patriots (1975); Tampa Bay Buccaneers (1976)*
- * Offseason or practice squad member only
- Stats at Pro Football Reference

Durwood Lee Keeton (born August 14, 1952) is an American former professional football defensive back who played one season with the New England Patriots of the National Football League (NFL). He was selected by the St. Louis Cardinals in the fourth round of the 1974 NFL draft. He played college football at Navarro College and the University of Oklahoma. He was also a member of the Southern California Sun and Tampa Bay Buccaneers.

== Early life ==
Keeton attended Bonham High School in Bonham, Texas.

== College career ==
Keeton played for the Navarro Bulldogs of Navarro College from 1970 to 1971.

Keeton transferred to play for the Oklahoma Sooners of the University of Oklahoma from 1972 to 1973. He earned All-Big Eight honors while also playing in the Blue–Gray and Senior Bowl games.

== Professional career ==
Keeton was selected by the St. Louis Cardinals in the fourth round with the 85th overall pick in the 1974 NFL draft.

Keeton played for the Southern California Sun of the World Football League in 1974, returning one interception for a touchdown.

Keeton played in twelve games for the New England Patriots during the 1975 season.

Keeton was drafted by the Tampa Bay Buccaneers in the 1976 NFL expansion draft. He was released by the team during training camp.
