= Honey Grove High School =

Location
- 1208 North 17th Avenue; Honey Grove, Texas 75446; United States; 33.591496°N 95.899915°W

Information
- School type: Public high school
- School district: Honey Grove Independent School District
- Principal: Brian Temple
- Staff: 18.67 (FTE)
- Grades: 9-12
- Enrollment: 221 (2023-2024)
- Student to teacher ratio: 11.84
- Colors: Orange, Black, & White
- Athletics conference: UIL Class AA
- Mascot: Warrior
- Website: www.honeygroveisd.net/hghs

Honey Grove High School is a 2A public high school located in Honey Grove, Texas, a small community in the northeast portion of the state. The school is part of the Honey Grove Independent School District, which encompasses eastern Fannin County. In 2013, the school was rated "Improvement Required" by the Texas Education Agency.

== Athletics ==
The Honey Grove Warriors compete in the following sports -

- Baseball
- Basketball
- Cross Country
- Football
- Golf
- Powerlifting
- Softball
- Tennis
- Track and Field

=== State finalists ===
- Girls Basketball -
  - 1991(2A)
