= Dodd City High School =

Coordinates: 33.5784°N 96.0747°W

Location
- 602 N Main St. Dodd City, Texas 75438-9801; United States

Information
- School type: Public high school
- School district: Dodd City Independent School District
- Principal: Bruce Mauppin
- Staff: 28.00 (FTE)
- Grades: PK-12
- Enrollment: 320 (2023-2024)
- Student to teacher ratio: 11.43
- Colors: Blue & Gold
- Athletics conference: UIL Class A
- Mascot: Hornet
- Website: Dodd City ISD

Dodd City High School is a public high school located in Dodd City, Texas, United States. It is part of the Dodd City Independent School District located in central Fannin County and classified as a 1A school by the UIL. In 2015, the school was rated "Met Standard" by the Texas Education Agency.

== Athletics ==
The Dodd City Hornets compete in these sports -

Volleyball, Basketball, Golf, Tennis, Track, Softball & Baseball

State Championships

- Boys Golf-John Burpo 2002

=== State Titles ===
- Girls Basketball -
  - 2021(1A)
- Softball -
  - 2021(1A)

==== State Finalists ====
- Girls Basketball -
  - 2002(1A/D2)
  - 2017 (1A/D2)
  - 2018 (1A/D2)
  - 2019 (1A/D2)

===== State Semifinalist =====
- Girls Softball
  - 2003(1A)
  - 2017(1A)
  - 2019(1A)
