= Leonard, Texas =

- City
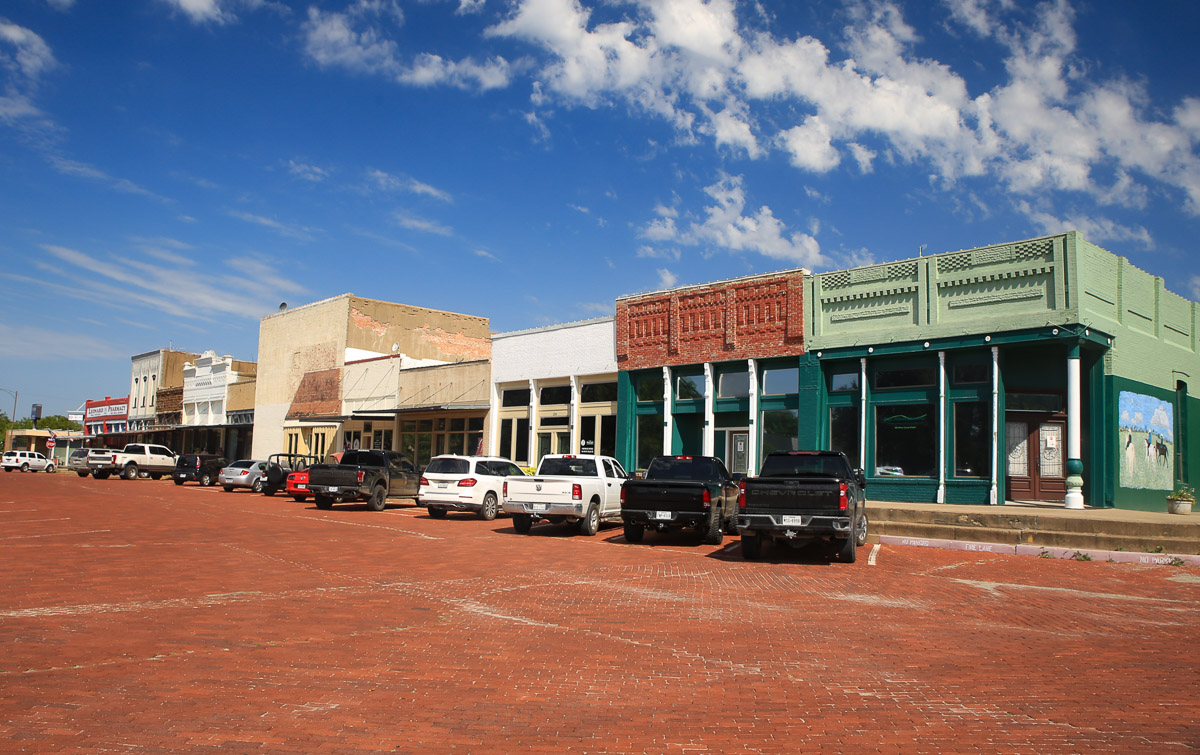
- Motto: "Biggest little town in Northeast Texas"
- Coordinates: 33°22′45″N 96°14′50″W
- Country: United States
- State: Texas
- County: Fannin

Area
  - Total: 2.29 sq mi (5.94 km^{2})
  - Land: 2.29 sq mi (5.94 km^{2})
  - Water: 0 sq mi (0.00 km^{2})
- Elevation: 725 ft (221 m)

Population (2020)
  - Total: 1,987
  - Density: 866/sq mi (335/km^{2})
- Time zone: UTC-6 (Central (CST))
  - Summer (DST): UTC-5 (CDT)
- ZIP code: 75452
- Area codes: 903, 430
- FIPS code: 48-42352
- GNIS feature ID: 2410822
- Website: www.cityofleonard.net

Leonard is a city in Fannin County, Texas, United States. The population was 1,987 at the 2020 census.

== Geography ==
Leonard is located in southwestern Fannin County. U.S. Route 69 passes along the northern and eastern edges of the city, leading northwest 34 miles (55 km) to Denison and southeast 20 miles (32 km) to Greenville. Texas State Highway 78 leads northeast 16 miles (26 km) to Bonham, the Fannin County seat, and southwest 24 miles (39 km) to Farmersville. The center of Dallas is 65 miles (105 km) southwest of Leonard via Highway 78.

According to the United States Census Bureau, the city of Leonard has a total area of 2.30 square miles (5.95 km^{2}), all land.

=== Climate ===
The climate in this area is characterized by hot, humid summers and generally mild to cool winters. According to the Köppen Climate Classification system, Leonard has a humid subtropical climate, abbreviated "Cfa" on climate maps.

== Demographics ==
Historical population
Census	Pop.	Note	%±
1890	392		—
1900	750		91.3%
1910	990		32.0%
1920	1,383		39.7%
1930	1,131		−18.2%
1940	1,331		17.7%
1950	1,211		−9.0%
1960	1,117		−7.8%
1970	1,423		27.4%
1980	1,421		−0.1%
1990	1,744		22.7%
2000	1,846		5.8%
2010	1,990		7.8%
2020	1,987		−0.2%
U.S. Decennial Census

=== 2020 census ===
As of the 2020 census, Leonard had a population of 1,987. The median age was 36.9 years, 27.3% of residents were under the age of 18, and 16.2% of residents were 65 years of age or older. For every 100 females there were 86.0 males, and for every 100 females age 18 and over there were 82.3 males age 18 and over.

There were 779 households in Leonard, of which 37.0% had children under the age of 18 living in them. Of all households, 47.0% were married-couple households, 14.9% were households with a male householder and no spouse or partner present, and 31.2% were households with a female householder and no spouse or partner present. About 26.3% of all households were made up of individuals and 13.0% had someone living alone who was 65 years of age or older.

There were 876 housing units, of which 11.1% were vacant. The homeowner vacancy rate was 2.7% and the rental vacancy rate was 9.4%.

0.0% of residents lived in urban areas, while 100.0% lived in rural areas.

Racial composition as of the 2020 census
Race	Number	Percent
White	1,542	77.6%
Black or African American	67	3.4%
American Indian and Alaska Native	30	1.5%
Asian	8	0.4%
Native Hawaiian and Other Pacific Islander	1	0.1%
Some other race	127	6.4%
Two or more races	212	10.7%
Hispanic or Latino (of any race)	288	14.5%

=== 2000 census ===
As of the census of 2000, there were 1,846 people, 683 households, and 497 families residing in the city. The population density was 936.8 inhabitants per square mile (361.7/km^{2}). There were 751 housing units at an average density of 381.1 per square mile (147.1/km^{2}). The racial makeup of the city was 84.99% White, 5.53% African American, 1.90% Native American, 0.11% Asian, 5.69% from other races, and 15.8% from two or more races. Hispanic or Latino of any race were 7.85% of the population.

There were 683 households, out of which 39.4% had children under the age of 18 living with them, 55.9% were married couples living together, 13.8% had a female householder with no husband present, and 27.2% were non-families. 25.2% of all households were made up of individuals, and 13.9% had no one living alone who was 65 years of age or older. The average household size was 2.65 and the average family size was 3.16.

In the city, the population was spread out, with 30.2% under the age of 18, 8.9% from 18 to 24, 27.7% from 25 to 44, 19.4% from 45 to 64, and 13.9% who were 65 years of age or older. The median age was 33 years. For every 100 females, there were 93.1 males. For every 100 females age 18 and over, there were 82.8 males.

The median income for a household in the city was $34,318, and the median income for a family was $40,461. Males had a median income of $32,071 versus $20,888 for females. The per capita income for the city was $14,747. About 12.9% of families and 17.7% of the population were below the poverty line, including 20.5% of those under age 18 and 27.5% of those age 65 or over.

== Education ==
The city of Leonard is served by the Leonard Independent School District.

== Notable people ==
- Polly McLarry, baseball player
- Ray Renfro, NFL football player
- Lori Erica Ruff, identity thief
- Jules V. Sikes, Texas A&M athlete and coach

== Photo gallery ==
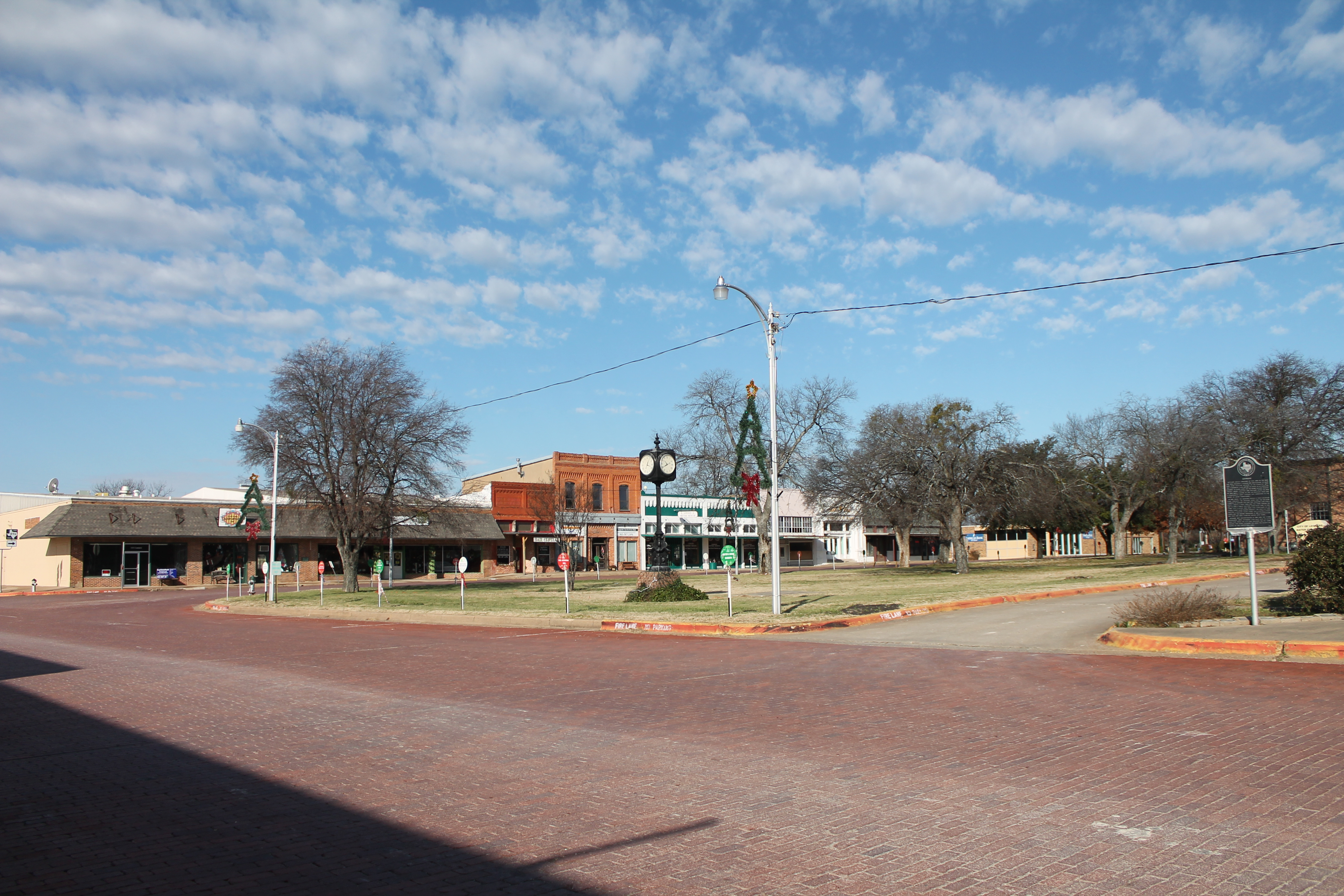
Downtown Leonard

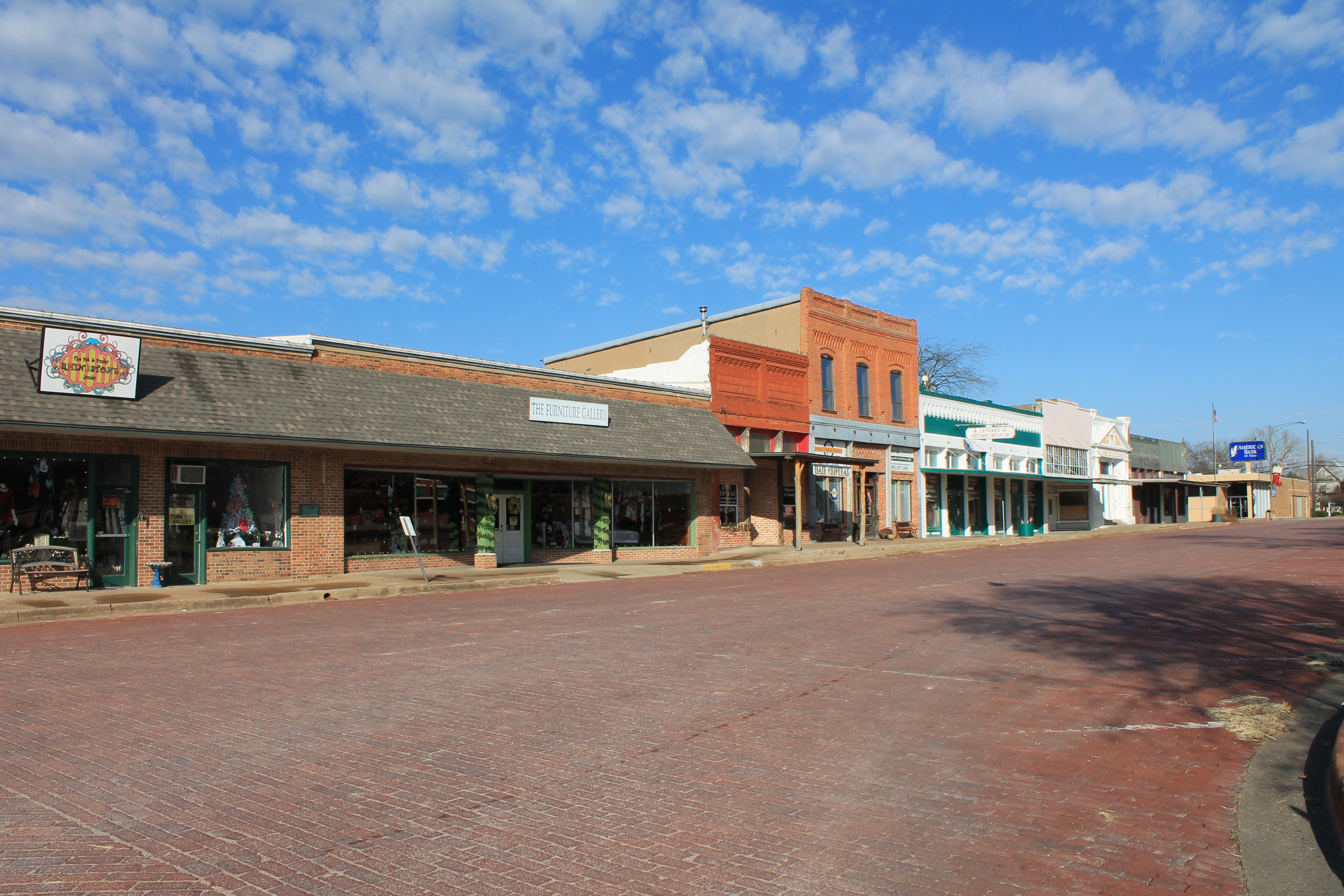
Downtown Leonard
