= Trenton, Texas =

- City
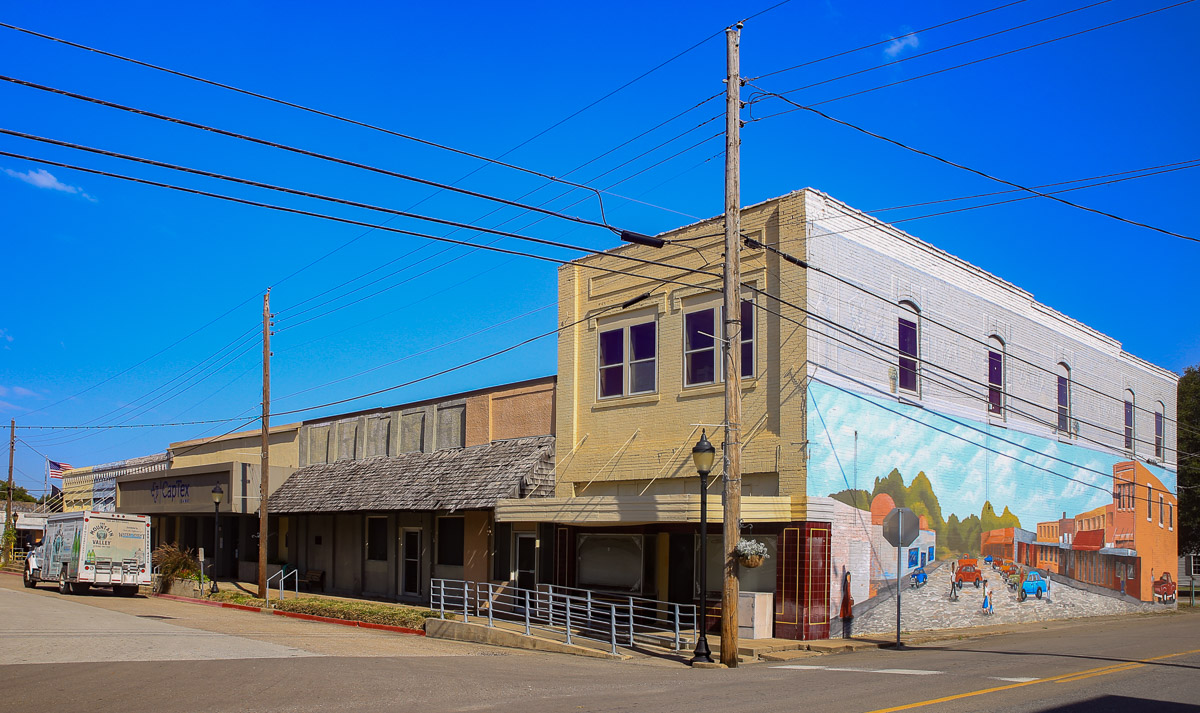
- Downtown Trenton, Texas

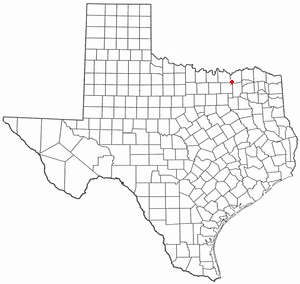
- Location of Trenton, Texas

- Coordinates: 33°24′10″N 96°20′25″W
- Country: United States
- State: Texas
- Counties: Fannin, Grayson

Area
  - Total: 1.87 sq mi (4.85 km^{2})
  - Land: 1.87 sq mi (4.85 km^{2})
  - Water: 0 sq mi (0.00 km^{2})
- Elevation: 758 ft (231 m)

Population (2020)
  - Total: 743
  - Density: 397/sq mi (153/km^{2})
- Time zone: UTC-6 (Central (CST))
  - Summer (DST): UTC-5 (CDT)
- ZIP code: 75490
- Area codes: 430, 903
- FIPS code: 48-73592
- GNIS feature ID: 2412092
- Website: www.cityoftrentontx.org

Trenton is a city in Fannin and Grayson counties in the U.S. state of Texas. As of the 2020 census, Trenton had a population of 743. The population is currently 854.

== History ==
Settlers from Tennessee arrived from their home state in 1852. At the time of their arrival, the settlement and surrounding area was known by the colorful name of "Wild Cat Thicket". With the arrival of the Missouri, Kansas and Texas Railroad, a townsite was platted by Dr. W. C. Holmes, a pioneer physician and editor of Trenton Tribune, and known as "the father of Trenton". The name "Trenton" was submitted to the postal authorities (after Trenton, New Jersey), and the post office opened under that name in 1881.

The railroad drew people to Trenton from nearby communities, and a depot was built. The first population figures available show 200 people living there in the mid-1880s. Fifteen years later the population was 300 and the town had a school and all essential businesses, including a newspaper, a steam gristmill, a hotel, and a boardinghouse. At that time it became a major shipping origination point for cotton, corn, and oats produced by area farmers. A national bank was opened in Trenton in 1901 and by 1914 was capitalized at $40,000. By the mid-1920s the population had risen to just over 600 people, and the Trenton school system had 300 students enrolled. In the early 1930s farmers in the vicinity, influenced by the success of local farmer P. E. Brown, began large-scale commercial production of onions. This new crop grew rapidly in importance, and production reached a peak in 1933 when 158 rail carloads were shipped from Trenton. The effects of the Great Depression were devastating in the region, and by 1936 Trenton's population had declined to less than 500. During this time of economic hardship, the number of businesses serving the community dwindled to 28. With the recovery of the economy, the population also began to rise, with 634 reported in 1948 to an all-time high of 712 by 1967. In 1977 Trenton reported 615 residents and seventeen businesses. By the early 1980s the town had become the third-largest shipping point for onions in North Texas. It had an estimated 682 people and twenty businesses by 1988. In 1990 its population totaled 655, and in 2000 662 people made up the town.

== Geography ==
Trenton is located in southwestern Fannin County. U.S. Route 69 passes through the northeastern part of the city, leading northwest 27 miles (43 km) to Denison and southeast 26 miles (42 km) to Greenville. Texas State Highway 121 passes through the northern part of Trenton, crossing US 69 at a diamond interchange. Highway 121 leads northeast 15 miles (24 km) to Bonham, the Fannin County seat, and southwest 17 miles (27 km) to Melissa. The center of Dallas is 57 miles (92 km) southwest of Trenton via Melissa and McKinney.

According to the United States Census Bureau, Trenton has a total area of 1.8 square miles (4.7 km^{2}), all land. A small portion of the city now extends west along FM 814 into Grayson County.

=== Climate ===
The climate in this area is characterized by hot, humid summers and generally mild to cool winters. According to the Köppen Climate Classification system, Trenton has a humid subtropical climate, abbreviated "Cfa" on climate maps.

== Demographics ==
Historical population
Census	Pop.	Note	%±
1900	420		—
1910	550		31.0%
1920	616		12.0%
1930	490		−20.5%
1940	634		29.4%
1950	603		−4.9%
1960	712		18.1%
1970	599		−15.9%
1980	691		15.4%
1990	655		−5.2%
2000	662		1.1%
2010	635		−4.1%
2020	743		17.0%
U.S. Decennial Census

=== 2020 census ===
As of the 2020 census, Trenton had a population of 743. The median age was 37.5 years, with 25.7% of residents under the age of 18 and 12.8% who were 65 years of age or older. For every 100 females there were 91.5 males, and for every 100 females age 18 and over there were 91.7 males age 18 and over.

There were 290 households in Trenton, of which 38.6% had children under the age of 18 living in them. Of all households, 47.9% were married-couple households, 17.2% were households with a male householder and no spouse or partner present, and 30.0% were households with a female householder and no spouse or partner present. About 25.5% of all households were made up of individuals and 12.1% had someone living alone who was 65 years of age or older.

There were 326 housing units, of which 11.0% were vacant. The homeowner vacancy rate was 1.8% and the rental vacancy rate was 5.1%.

0.0% of residents lived in urban areas, while 100.0% lived in rural areas.

Racial composition as of the 2020 census
Race	Number	Percent
White	574	77.3%
Black or African American	18	2.4%
American Indian and Alaska Native	6	0.8%
Asian	0	0.0%
Native Hawaiian and Other Pacific Islander	0	0.0%
Some other race	58	7.8%
Two or more races	87	11.7%
Hispanic or Latino (of any race)	127	17.1%

=== 2007 ===
As of the census of 2007, there were 750 people, 276 households, and 187 families residing in the city. The population density was 416.8 inhabitants per square mile (160.9/km^{2}). There were 313 housing units at an average density of 197.1 per square mile (76.1/km^{2}). The racial makeup of the city was 84.89% White, 6.34% African American, 1.21% Native American, 6.04% from other races, and 1.51% from two or more races. Hispanic or Latino of any race were 11.33% of the population.

There were 276 households, out of which 31.9% had children under the age of 18 living with them, 50.4% were married couples living together, 13.4% had a female householder with no husband present, and 32.2% were non-families. 30.1% of all households were made up of individuals, and 15.2% had someone living alone who was 65 years of age or older. The average household size was 2.40 and the average family size was 2.97.

In the city, the population was spread out, with 26.3% under the age of 18, 8.0% from 18 to 24, 28.1% from 25 to 44, 22.1% from 45 to 64, and 15.6% who were 65 years of age or older. The median age was 37 years. For every 100 females, there were 91.9 males. For every 100 females age 18 and over, there were 91.4 males.

The median income for a household in the city was $40,066, and the median income for a family was $43,906. Males had a median income of $35,000 versus $26,458 for females. The per capita income for the city was $22,129. About 13.4% of families and 15.0% of the population were below the poverty line, including 20.9% of those under age 18 and 17.4% of those age 65 or over.

== Education ==
Trenton is served by the Trenton Independent School District and is home to the Trenton High School Tigers. Trenton High School is currently four-time UIL district champions as of 2017 and were BEST Robotics Champions in 2017, 2019, 2021.

== Notable people ==
- Lloyd Mangrum, professional golfer who was inducted into the World Golf Hall of Fame in 1999; born in Trenton

== See also ==
- List of municipalities in Texas
