= Ravenna, Texas =

- City
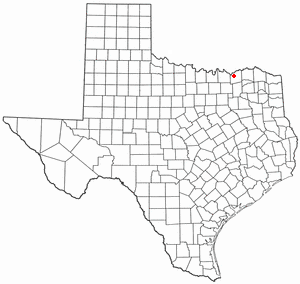
- Location of Ravenna, Texas

- Coordinates: 33°40′14″N 96°14′27″W
- Country: United States
- State: Texas
- County: Fannin

Area
  - Total: 1.20 sq mi (3.12 km^{2})
  - Land: 1.20 sq mi (3.12 km^{2})
  - Water: 0 sq mi (0.00 km^{2})
- Elevation: 604 ft (184 m)

Population (2020)
  - Total: 175
  - Density: 145/sq mi (56.1/km^{2})
- Time zone: UTC-6 (Central (CST))
  - Summer (DST): UTC-5 (CDT)
- ZIP code: 75476
- Area codes: 903, 430
- FIPS code: 48-60752
- GNIS feature ID: 2411523
- Website: www.ravennatexas.com

Ravenna is a city in Fannin County, Texas, United States. Its population was 175 at the 2020 census.

== Geography ==
Ravenna is located in northwestern Fannin County. It is 9 miles (14 km) northwest of Bonham, the county seat, 14 miles (23 km) northeast of Bells, and 5 miles (8 km) southeast of the Red River, the Oklahoma border.

According to the United States Census Bureau, Ravenna has a total area of 1.20 square miles (3.12 km^{2}), all land.

== Demographics ==
Historical population
Census	Pop.	Note	%±
1890	237		—
1900	290		22.4%
1920	412		—
1930	254		−38.3%
1940	248		−2.4%
2000	215		—
2010	209		−2.8%
2020	175		−16.3%
U.S. Decennial Census; 2020 Census

=== 2020 census ===
As of the 2020 census, Ravenna had a population of 175. The median age was 45.5 years; 17.7% of residents were under 18 and 23.4% were 65 or older. For every 100 females, there were 113.4 males, and for every 100 females 18 and over, there were 108.7 males 18 and over.

None of the residents lived in urban areas, while 100.0% lived in rural areas.

Of the 73 households in Ravenna, 32.9% had children under 18 living in them, 53.4% were married-couple households, 21.9% were households with a male householder and no spouse or partner present, and 21.9% were households with a female householder and no spouse or partner present. About 24.6% of all households were made up of individuals, and 15.0% had someone living alone who was 65 years of age or older.

The city had 88 housing units, of which 17.0% were vacant. The homeowner vacancy rate was 1.4%, and the rental vacancy rate was 28.6%.

Racial composition as of the 2020 census
Race	Number	Percentage
White	164	93.7%
Black or African American	1	0.6%
American Indian and Alaska Native	0	0.0%
Asian	0	0.0%
Native Hawaiian and other Pacific Islander	0	0.0%
Some other race	3	1.7%
Two or more races	7	4.0%
Hispanic or Latino (of any race)	5	2.9%

=== 2000 census ===
As of the 2000 census, 215 people, 86 households, and 65 families resided in the city. The population density was 177.6 inhabitants per square mile (68.6/km^{2}). The 94 housing units had an average density of 77.6 per square mile (30.0/km^{2}). The racial makeup of the city was 97.67% White, 0.93% from other races, and 1.40% from two or more races. Hispanics or Latinos of any race were 1.40% of the population.

Of the 86 households, 32.6% had children under 18 living with them, 65.1% were married couples living together, 5.8% had a female householder with no husband present, and 24.4% were not families. About 22.1% of all households were made up of individuals, and 15.1% had someone living alone who was 65 or older. The average household size was 2.50, and the average family size was 2.91.

In the city, the age distribution was 27.0% under 18, 6.0% from 18 to 24, 27.0% from 25 to 44, 23.3% from 45 to 64, and 16.7% who were 65 or older. The median age was 38 years. For every 100 females, there were 100.9 males. For every 100 females 18 and over, there were 96.3 males.

The median income in the city for a household was $31,875 and for a family was $42,778. Males had a median income of $33,125 versus $17,500 for females. The per capita income for the city was $13,581. About 12.1% of families and 17.5% of the population were below the poverty line, including 28.8% of those under 18 and 17.1% of those 65 or over.

== Education ==
Ravenna is served by the Bonham Independent School District.

== Notable person ==
- Mary Lightfoot, painter and printmaker, was born in Ravenna.
