= Mulberry, Texas =

- Unincorporated community
- Location within the state of Texas Mulberry (the United States)
- Coordinates: 33°43′16″N 96°16′52″W
- Country: United States
- State: Texas
- County: Fannin
- Elevation: 548 ft (167 m)
- Time zone: UTC-6 (Central (CST))
  - Summer (DST): UTC-5 (CDT)
- ZIP code: 75476
- Area code: 903
- GNIS feature ID: 1363439

Mulberry is an unincorporated community in northwestern Fannin County, Texas, United States. The population as of the year 2000 was 17.

== History ==
Settlers first arrived in the area in the early 1840s, and increased following the Civil War, with settlers arriving from Mississippi, Illinois, Missouri, and Tennessee. Mulberry was established in the early 1880s, and named for the mulberry trees growing here. The early settlement was noted for its healthy atmosphere; being away from swamps and lakes it was free of malaria, which affected other communities. A post office was established in 1886, and closed in 1906. The settlement had two cotton gins, a church, blacksmith shop, general store, and the "largest free school in the county". The population was 89 in the mid-1930s, and declined to 17 in 1977; it remained at 17 in 2000.

A Texas Historical Marker is located at Mulberry Cemetery.

== Notable people ==
- Tom Douglas Spies - physician and medical educator
