= Bonham High School (Texas) =

Public school in Texas, United States

Coordinates: 33.5914°N 96.1902°W

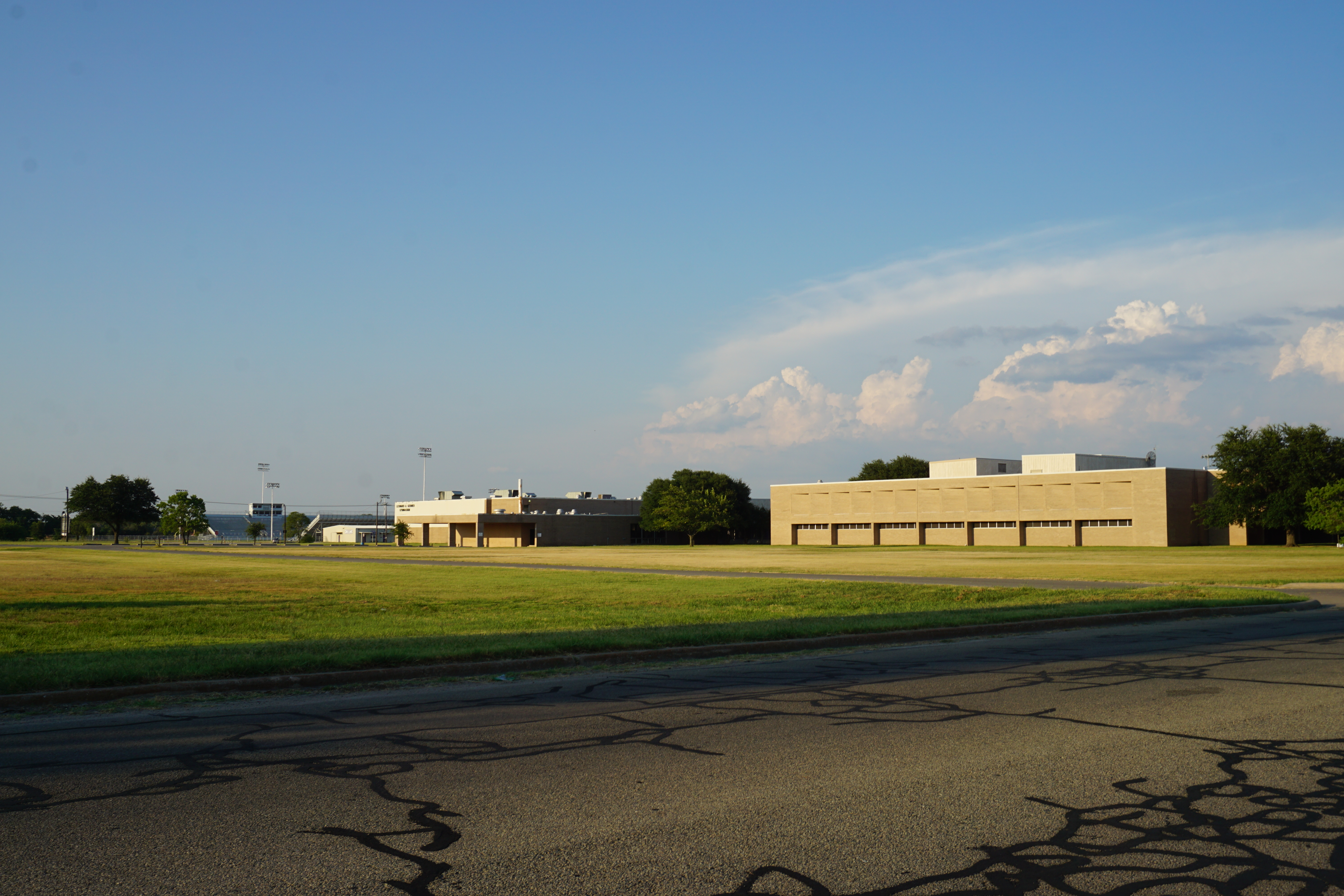
- Bonham High School in 2016

Location
- 1002 Warpath Dr. Bonham, Texas 75418; United States

Information
- School type: Public high school
- School district: Bonham Independent School District
- Principal: Panchi Scown
- Teaching staff: 41.90 (FTE)
- Grades: 9-12
- Enrollment: 560 (2023-2024)
- Student to teacher ratio: 13.37
- Colors: Purple & White
- Athletics conference: UIL Class 4A
- Mascot: Warrior
- Yearbook: Coushatta
- Website: bhs.bonhamisd.org

Bonham High School is a public high school located in Bonham, Texas, United States and classified as a 4A school by the University Interscholastic League (UIL). It is part of the Bonham Independent School District which encompasses central Fannin County. In 2015, the school was rated "Met Standard" by the Texas Education Agency.

== Athletics ==
The Bonham Purple Warriors compete in these sports -

Volleyball, Cross Country, Football, Basketball, Powerlifting, Soccer, Tennis, Golf, Track, Baseball & Softball, Robotics

=== State titles ===
- Boys Track -
  - 1978(3A)
- Girls Track -
  - 1989(3A)

== Notable alumni ==
- Danny Darwin, former Major League Baseball pitcher (1978–98)
- Roy McMillan, former Major League Baseball player and manager (1951-1975)
