= Honey Grove Independent School District =

School District in Honey Grove, Texas

Location
- Honey Grove, Texas United States

District information
- Type: Public School
- Grades: PK-12
- Superintendent: Todd Morrison

Students and staff
- Athletic conference: UIL Class 2A
- District mascot: Warriors
- Colors: Orange, Black, & White

Other information
- Website: www.hgisd.net

Honey Grove Independent School District is a 2A public school district based in Honey Grove, Texas, United States.

== History ==
On July 1, 1987, Windom Independent School District merged into Honey Grove ISD, and as a result the district was renamed the Honey Grove Consolidated Independent School District.

The district built a new high school and a new track during the 2008–09 school year. Honey Grove is recognized for its academic achievement. In 2009, the school district was rated "academically acceptable" by the Texas Education Agency. In addition to Honey Grove, the district also serves the town of Windom. Located in Fannin County, a small portion of the district extends into Lamar County.

== Schools ==
Honey Grove ISD operates three schools:

- Honey Grove High School (Grades 9–12)
- Honey Grove Middle School (Grades 6–8)
- Honey Grove Elementary School (Grades PK-5)
