= Trenton Independent School District =

School district in Texas

Location
- Trenton, Texas United States

District information
- Type: Public School
- Grades: PK-12
- Superintendent: Jeremy Strickland

Students and staff
- Athletic conference: UIL Class 2A
- District mascot: Tigers
- Colors: Red, Black, and White

Trenton Independent School District is a public school district based in Trenton, Texas (USA). The district serves students in southwest Fannin County.

== Schools ==
- Trenton High School (Grades 9-12)
- Trenton Middle School (Grades 6-8)
- Trenton Elementary School (Grades PK-5)

In 2017, the school district was rated as "Met Standard" by the Texas Education Agency.
