= Gober, Texas =

- Unincorporated community
- Location within the state of Texas Gober (the United States)
- Coordinates: 33°28′08″N 96°05′19″W
- Country: United States
- State: Texas
- County: Fannin
- Elevation: 650 ft (200 m)
- Time zone: UTC-6 (Central (CST))
  - Summer (DST): UTC-5 (CDT)
- ZIP codes: 75443
- Area codes: 903, 430
- GNIS feature ID: 1381921

Gober is an unincorporated community in southeastern Fannin County, Texas, United States. Although Gober is unincorporated, it has a post office, with the ZIP code of 75443, which first opened in 1879.

Gober was established as "Grittersville" in the 1840s; the name was changed in 1885 to honor the builders of the community's first mill, who were named Gober. The community has declined somewhat from its high point in the 1930s; today, it lies at the junction of FM 68 and FM 271.
