= Leonard Independent School District =

School district in Texas, United States

Location
- Leonard, Texas United States

District information
- Type: Public School
- Grades: PK-12
- Superintendent: Brad Maxwell

Students and staff
- Athletic conference: UIL Class 3A
- District mascot: Tigers
- Colors: Blue & Gold

Leonard Independent School District is a public school district based in Leonard, Texas (USA).

In 2009, the school district was rated "recognized" by the Texas Education Agency. The school's mascot is the Tiger and the colors are Blue and Gold. Their mascot's name is Paws.

== Schools ==
- Leonard High School (Grades 9-12)
- Leonard Junior High School (Grades 6-8)
- Leonard Intermediate School (Grades 4-5)
- Leonard Elementary School (Grades PK-3)
