= Honey Grove, Texas =

- City
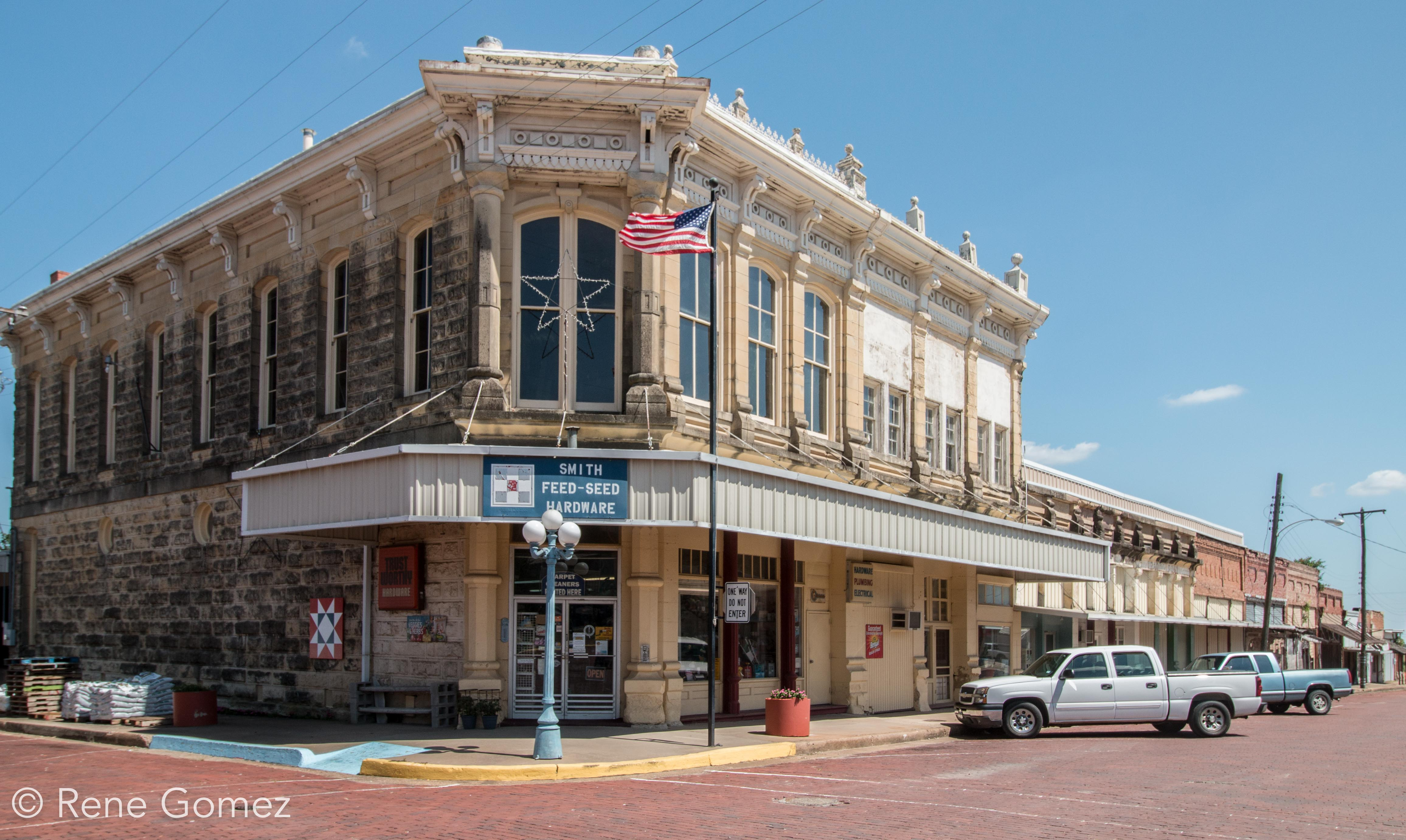
- Nickname: "The Sweetest Town in Texas"
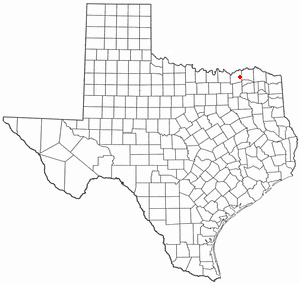
- Location of Honey Grove, Texas

- Coordinates: 33°35′27″N 95°54′16″W
- Country: United States
- State: Texas
- County: Fannin

Area
  - Total: 3.02 sq mi (7.83 km^{2})
  - Land: 2.98 sq mi (7.72 km^{2})
  - Water: 0.042 sq mi (0.11 km^{2})
- Elevation: 659 ft (201 m)

Population (2020)
  - Total: 1,715
  - Density: 575/sq mi (222/km^{2})
- Time zone: UTC-6 (Central (CST))
  - Summer (DST): UTC-5 (CDT)
- ZIP Code: 75446
- Area codes: 903, 430
- FIPS code: 48-34700
- GNIS feature ID: 2410785
- Website: cityofhoneygrove.org

Honey Grove is a city in Fannin County, Texas, United States. Honey Grove bills itself as "The Sweetest Town in Texas". The population was 1,715 at the 2020 census, up from 1,668 at the 2010 census.

== History ==
David Crockett discovered the area of Honey Grove when he camped there on his way to join the Texas Army at San Antonio in 1836. Crockett sent many letters back to Tennessee, telling of an area with an abundance of honey-filled trees, hence the town's name. In 1837, Samuel Erwin became the first settler of the place. B. S. Walcott contributed much to the town's development, by planning the city's landscape and later on by selling building lots. In 1873, Honey Grove was officially established.

Samuel Erwin and David Crockett, old friends from Kentucky, were instrumental in the founding of Honey Grove. Samuel Augustus Erwin has a large gravestone marker in Honey Grove, stating: "Virginia-born Samuel Erwin was married in 1819 in Tennessee to Sally Rodgers Crisp (1795–1860), in a ceremony performed by local magistrate David Crockett. First settler in the Honey Grove area, Erwin arrived here in 1837 and surveyed land grants for other pioneers. A surveyor by profession, he platted the town site for his friend B.S. Wolcott in 1848. He was the town's first postmaster and one of Fannin County's earliest Justices of the Peace."

The Crockett Park Monument, in the same area, indicates that Honey Grove was named by Crockett, but he died before it could become a town. It states that one of his old friends, Sam Erwin, became the founder of the settlement. The monument reads in part that Crockett traveled by riverboat, horseback, and on foot, entering Texas along the Red River, camping at a site half a mile northeast of today's park, where he found wild bees and honey in hollow trees, and called the campsite a "honey grove". He is said to have told friends he would settle here later, but he died a few weeks later in the cause of Texan liberty, at the Alamo.

In 2007, Honey Grove was also a temporary filming location for an episode of One Tree Hill, in which the local high school won a contest the CW and Sunkist promoted. Fans submitted videos in hopes their town would be selected. Mark Schwahn, the creator of One Tree Hill, ultimately chose Honey Grove High School as the winner. The cast from One Tree Hill, who filmed with Honey Grove High School, included Chad Michael Murray, Sophia Bush, Hilarie Burton, James Lafferty, and Bethany Joy Lenz.

Honey Grove Texas was also included in the television miniseries A Woman of Independent Means, starring Sally Field and Tony Goldwyn.

== Geography ==
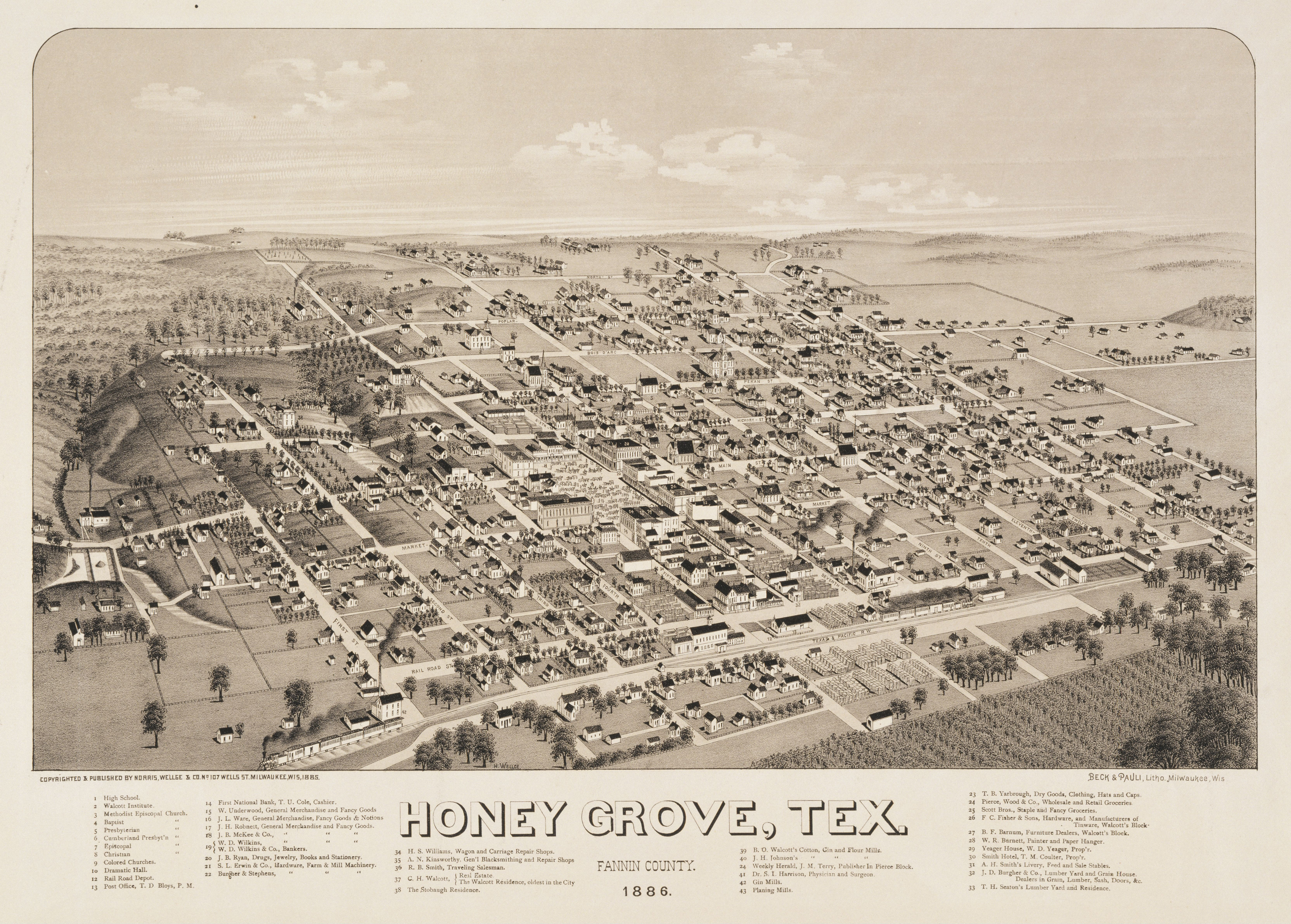
Map of the city in 1886

Honey Grove is in central North Texas, in eastern Fannin County, 16 miles (26 km) east of Bonham, the county seat, 21 miles (34 km) west of Paris, 39 miles (63 km) north of Greenville, 42 miles (68 km) east of Sherman, and 90 miles (140 km) northeast of the central business district of Dallas. Honey Grove was developed on flat to gently rolling terrain with scattered trees. The city is at an elevation ranging from about 580 to 690 feet (180 to 210 m) above sea level. U.S. Highway 82 and State Highway 56 traverse the city from east to west, and State Roads 34, 100, and 824 run north and south. Bonham is the closest major economic center. Its climate produces an annual average daily maximum temperature of 75.1 °F, and an average annual rainfall is 43.99 inches (1,117 mm). It is also a part of the Texoma region.

According to the United States Census Bureau, the city has a total area of 3.0 square miles (7.8 km^{2}), of which 3.0 square miles (7.7 km^{2}) are land and 0.04 square miles (0.1 km^{2}), or 1.40%, is covered by water.

=== Climate ===
The climate in this area is characterized by hot, humid summers and generally mild to cool winters. According to the Köppen climate classification, Honey Grove has a humid subtropical climate, Cfa on climate maps.

== Demographics ==
Historical population
| Census | Pop. | Note | %± |
|---|---|---|---|
| 1860 | 284 | | — |
| 1870 | 382 | | 34.5% |
| 1880 | 884 | | 131.4% |
| 1890 | 1,828 | | 106.8% |
| 1900 | 2,483 | | 35.8% |
| 1910 | 2,300 | | −7.4% |
| 1920 | 2,642 | | 14.9% |
| 1930 | 2,475 | | −6.3% |
| 1940 | 2,456 | | −0.8% |
| 1950 | 2,340 | | −4.7% |
| 1960 | 2,071 | | −11.5% |
| 1970 | 1,853 | | −10.5% |
| 1980 | 1,973 | | 6.5% |
| 1990 | 1,681 | | −14.8% |
| 2000 | 1,746 | | 3.9% |
| 2010 | 1,668 | | −4.5% |
| 2020 | 1,715 | | 2.8% |
U.S. Decennial Census

=== 2020 census ===
As of the 2020 census, Honey Grove had a population of 1,715 and the median age was 37.5 years. 27.9% of residents were under the age of 18 and 17.5% were 65 years of age or older; for every 100 females there were 91.6 males, and for every 100 females age 18 and over there were 86.0 males.

There were 667 households in Honey Grove, of which 36.0% had children under the age of 18 living in them. Of all households, 40.5% were married-couple households, 17.2% were households with a male householder and no spouse or partner present, and 35.5% were households with a female householder and no spouse or partner present. Of all households, 29.0% were made up of individuals and 14.9% had someone living alone who was 65 years of age or older.

There were 778 housing units, of which 14.3% were vacant. The homeowner vacancy rate was 1.8% and the rental vacancy rate was 8.1%.

Of residents, 0.0% lived in urban areas, while 100.0% lived in rural areas.

Racial composition as of the 2020 census
| Race | Number | Percent |
|---|---|---|
| White | 1,142 | 66.6% |
| Black or African American | 213 | 12.4% |
| American Indian and Alaska Native | 23 | 1.3% |
| Asian | 3 | 0.2% |
| Native Hawaiian and Other Pacific Islander | 0 | 0.0% |
| Some other race | 162 | 9.4% |
| Two or more races | 172 | 10.0% |
| Hispanic or Latino (of any race) | 269 | 15.7% |

=== 2000 census ===
As of the census of 2000, 1,746 people, 693 households, and 451 families were residing in the city. The population density was 661.5 inhabitants per square mile (255.4/km^{2}). The 814 housing units averaged 308.4/sq mi (119.0/km^{2}). The racial makeup of the city was 78.87% White, 16.32% African American, 0.40% Native American, 0.34% Asian, 0.06% Pacific Islander, 2.58% from other races, and 1.43% from two or more races. Hispanics or Latinos of any race were 5.90% of the population.

Of the 693 households, 29.7% had children under the age of 18 living with them, 48.8% were married couples living together, 13.6% had a female householder with no husband present, and 34.8% were not families. Of all households, 32.3% were made up of individuals, and 19.8% had someone living alone who was 65 years of age or older. The average household size was 2.39 and the average family size was 3.04.

In the city, the population was distributed as 25.3% under the age of 18, 7.4% from 18 to 24, 24.6% from 25 to 44, 19.7% from 45 to 64, and 23.0% who were 65 years of age or older. The median age was 39 years. For every 100 females, there were 85.2 males. For every 100 females age 18 and over, there were 78.5 males.

The median income for a household in the city was $28,859, and for a family was $37,266. Males had a median income of $27,560 versus $22,050 for females. The per capita income for the city was $14,701. About 12.4% of families and 16.2% of the population were below the poverty line, including 21.3% of those under age 18 and 16.7% of those age 65 or over.

== Government ==
Honey Grove is a type A, general law municipality whose government consists of a mayor and five aldermen. The mayor presides over council meetings, is signatory for the city, and is recognized as the ceremonial and governmental head of the city for most purposes.

== Education ==
The city of Honey Grove is served by the Honey Grove Independent School District. In 2009, the district built a new high school, track, and gymnasium.

== Notable people ==
- Tyler Bryant, member of Tyler Bryant & the Shakedown
- Bill Erwin, actor
- Robert G. "Bob" Goss (1898–1978), former police chief of Kilgore, and Texas Ranger
- John Underwood, former NFL player
- Mule Wilson, former NFL player
- Lawrence Odell Holley 1901-1985 - father of Buddy Holly, rock and roll legend.

== Photo gallery ==
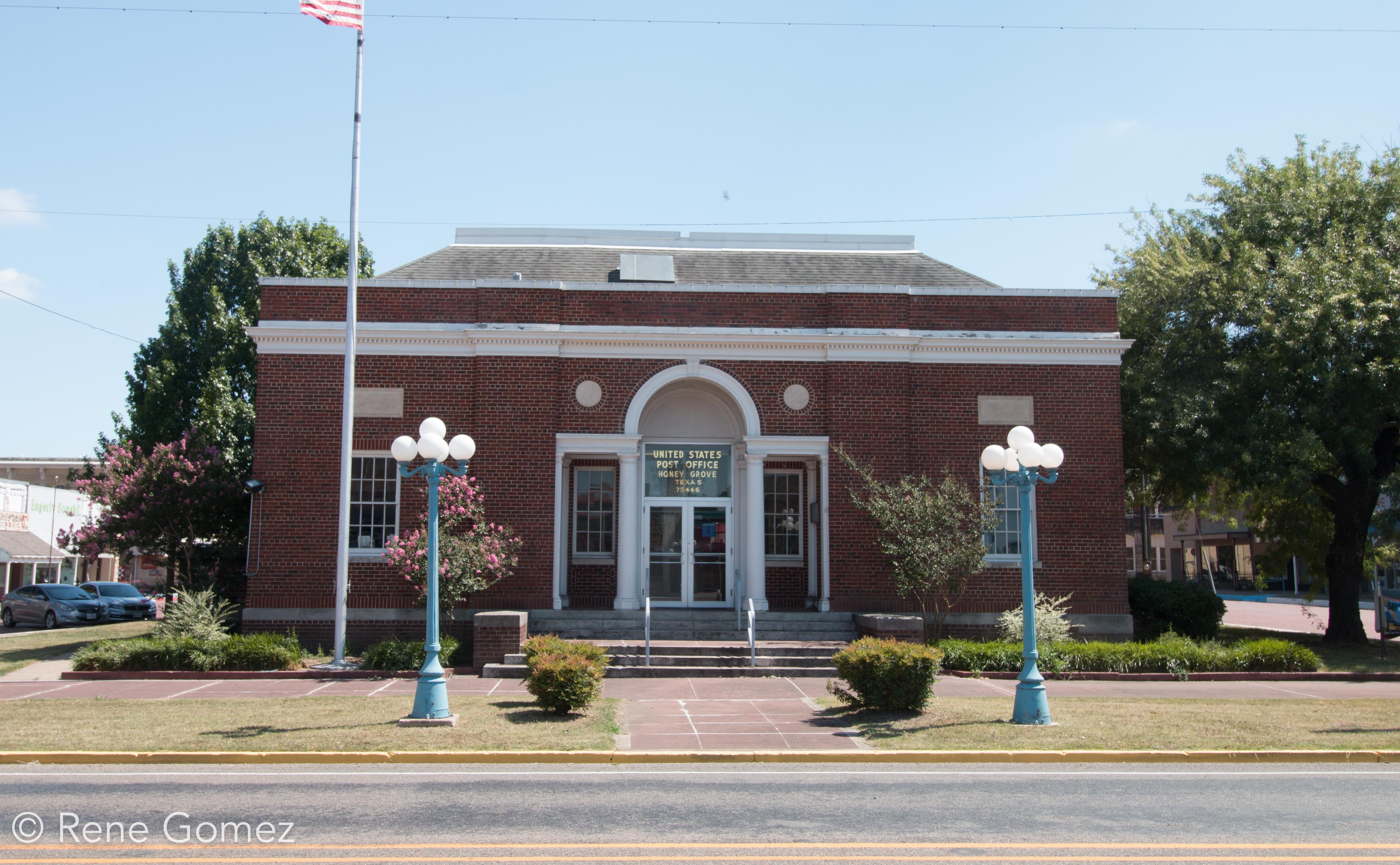
Post Office

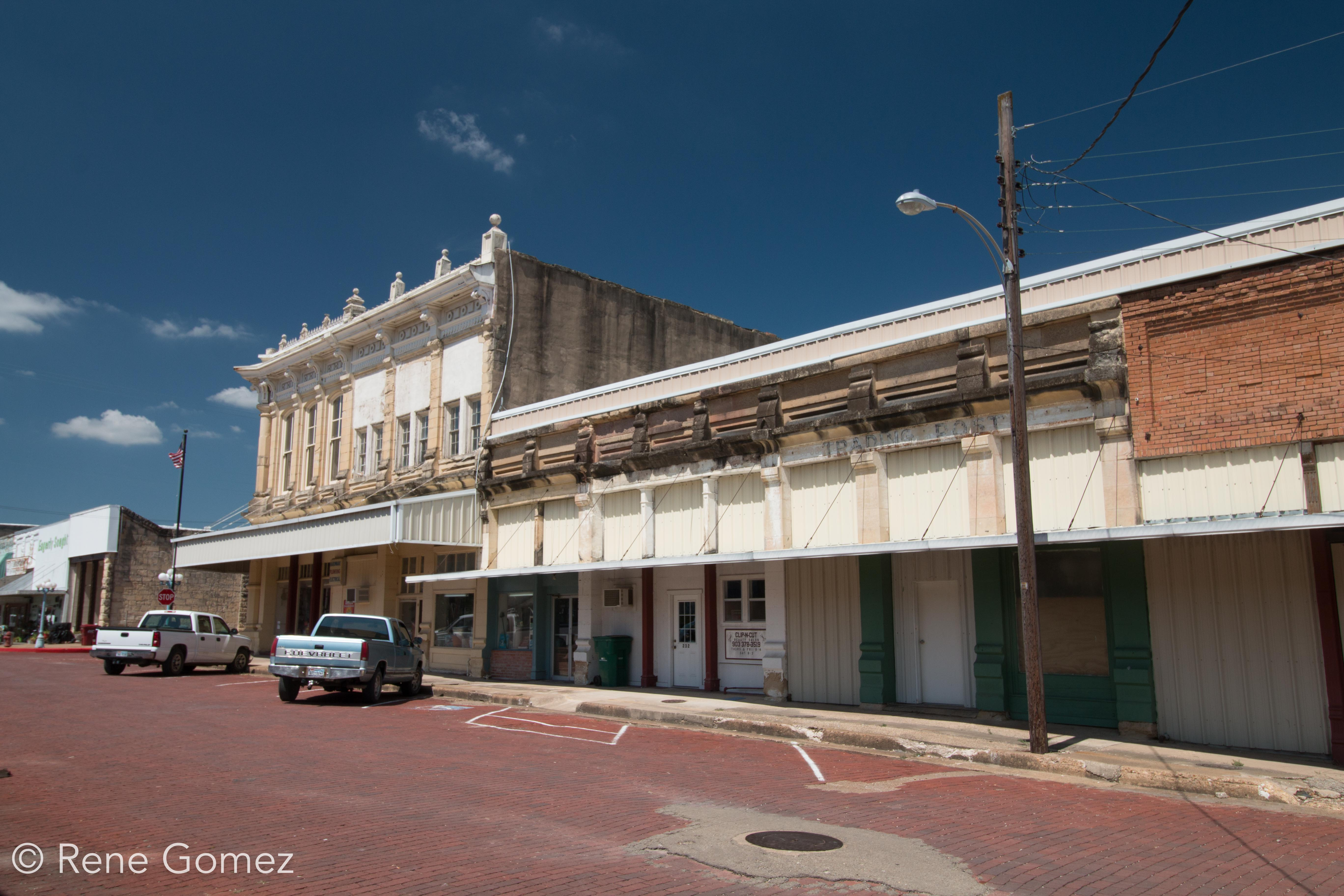
Downtown Honey Grove

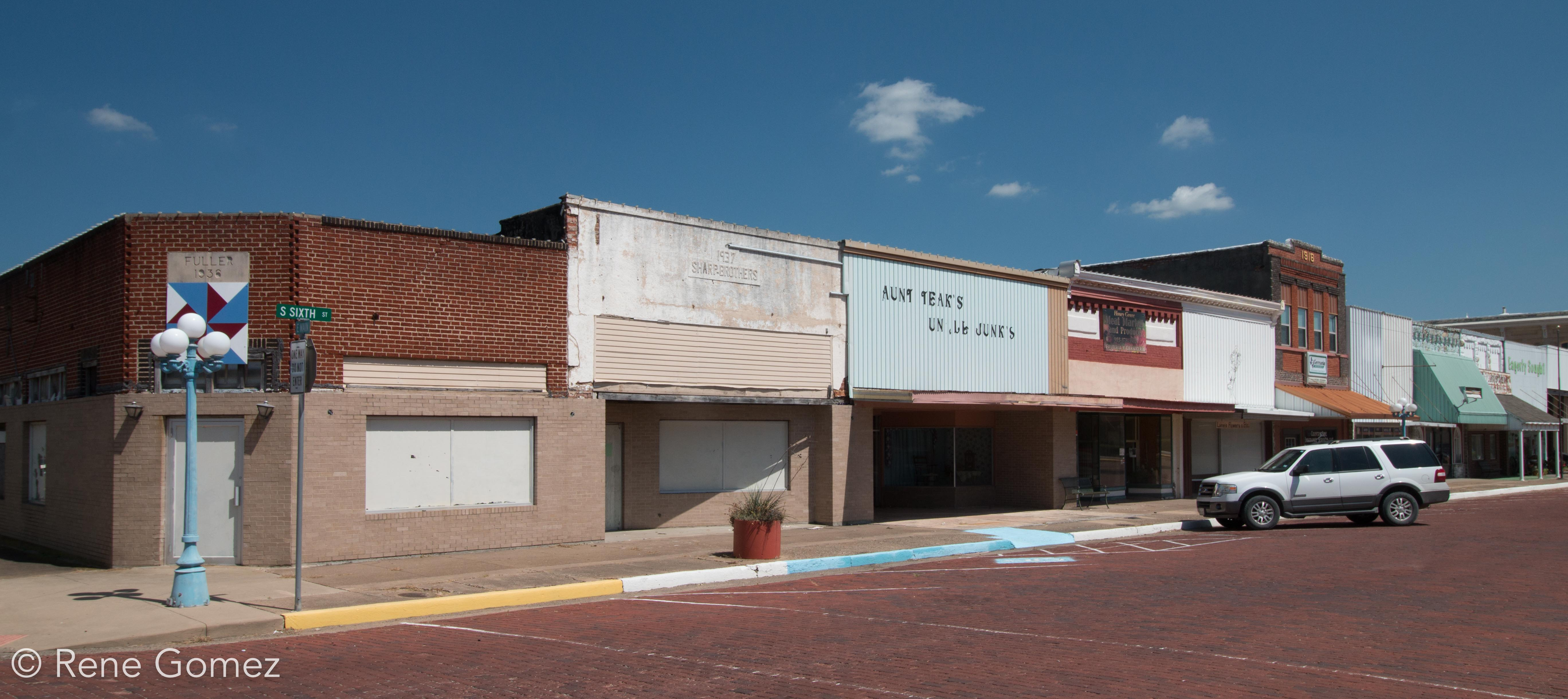
Downtown Honey Grove

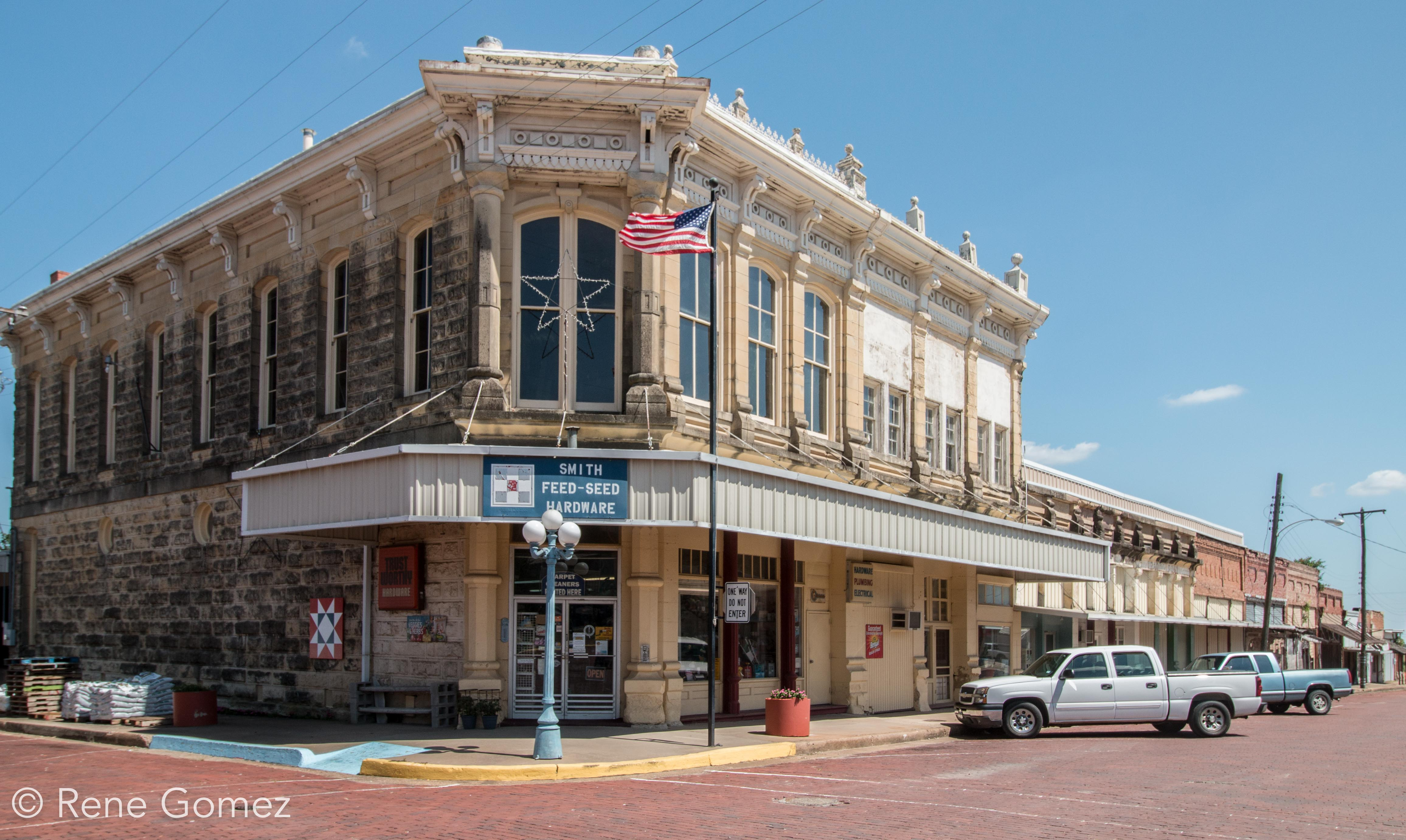
Downtown Honey Grove

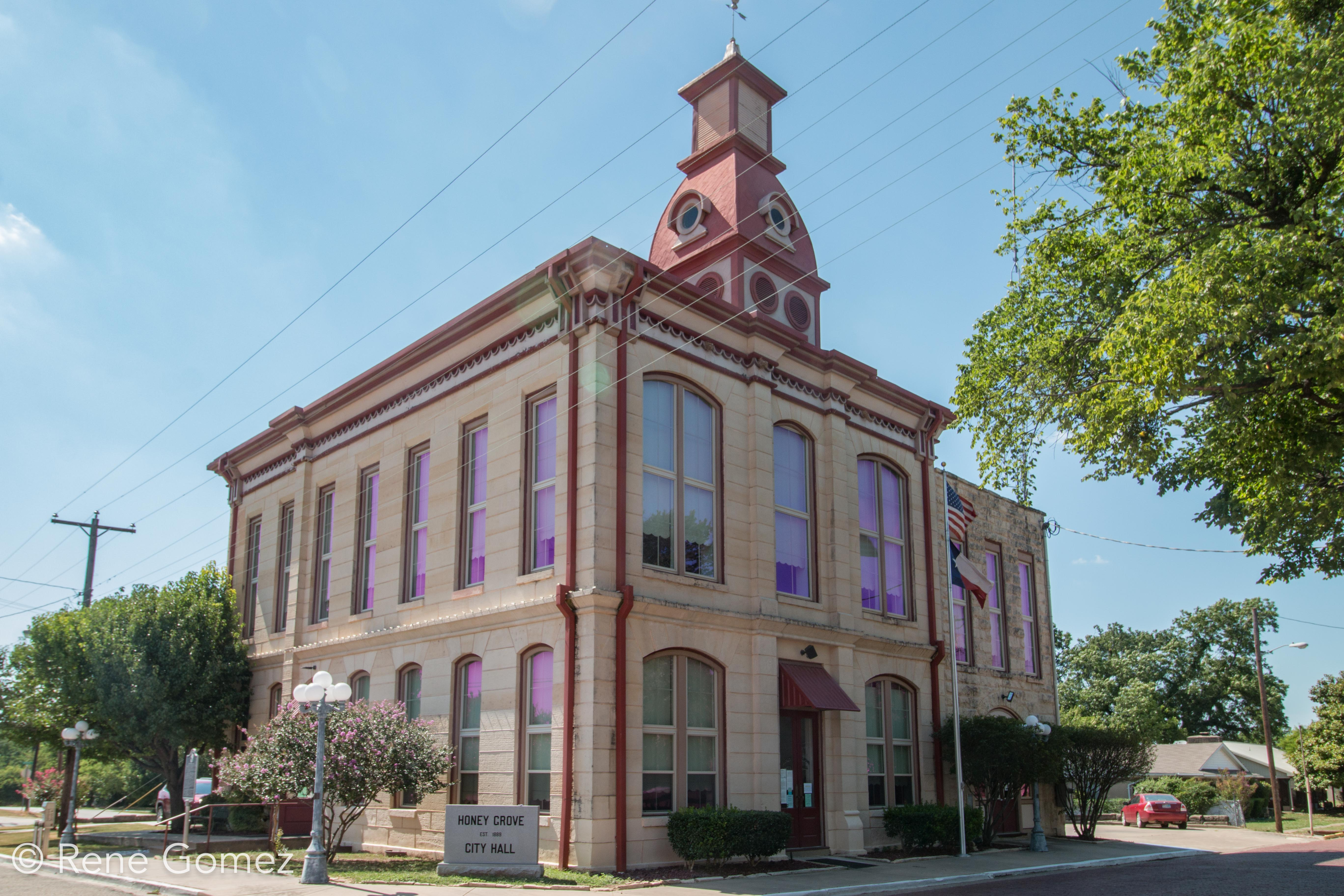
City Hall

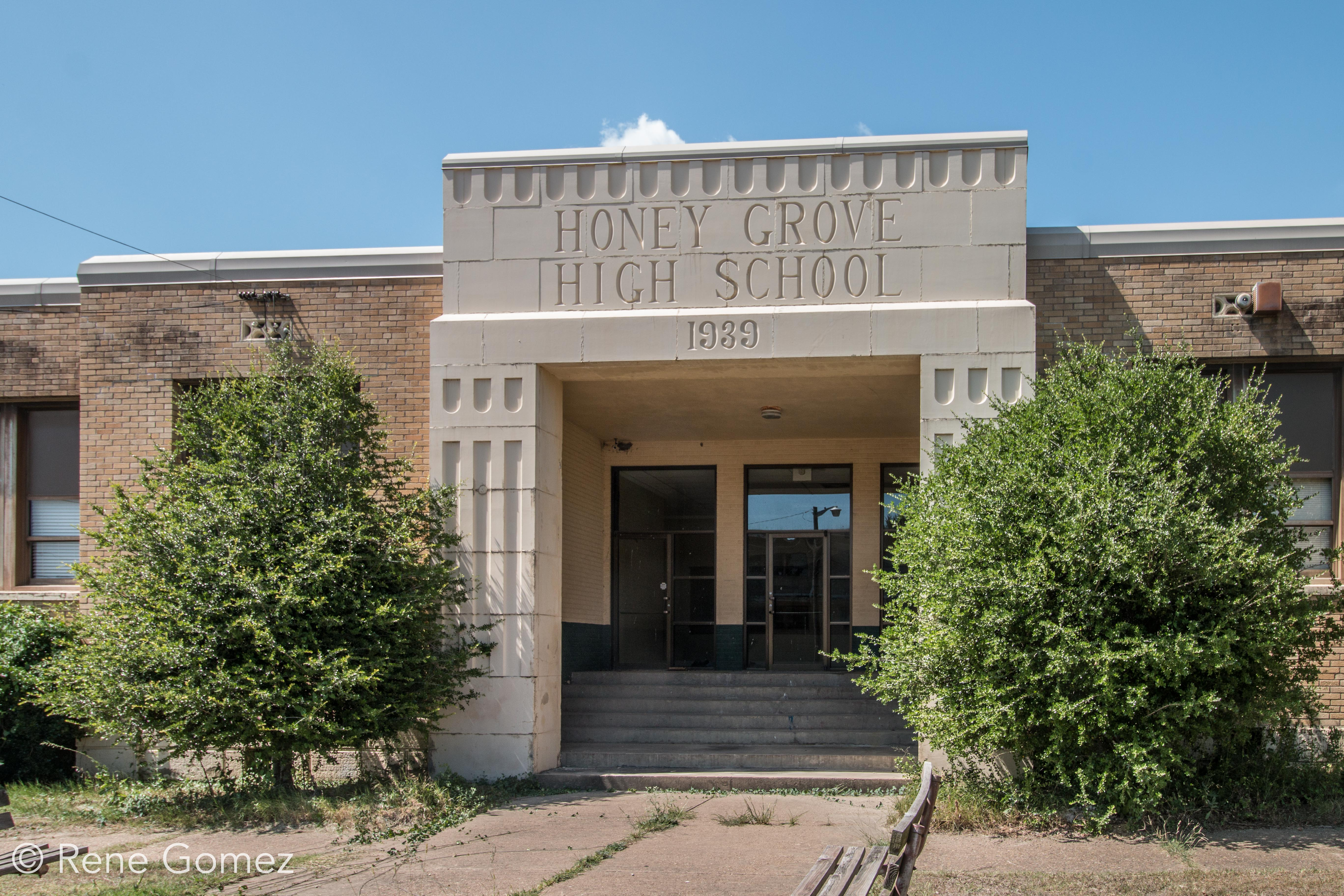
High School 1939

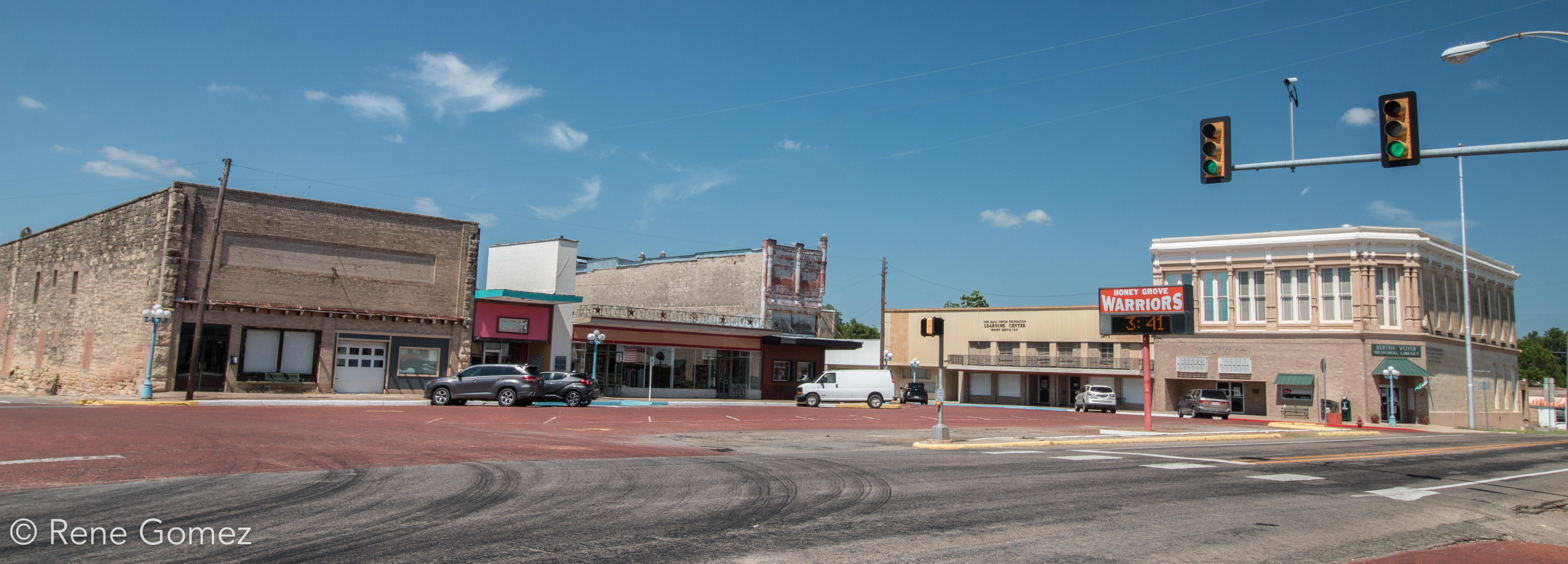
Downtown Honey Grove
