= Bonham Independent School District =

School district in Texas, United States

Location
- 1005 Chestnut St. Bonham, Texas ESC Region 10 United States
- Coordinates: 33°34′59″N 96°10′36″W

District information
- Type: Independent school district
- Grades: Pre-K through 12
- Superintendent: Jason Busbey (Interim/COO)
- Schools: 6 (2009-10)
- NCES District ID: 4810800

Students and staff
- Students: 1,927 (2010-11)
- Teachers: 158.95 (2009-10) (on full-time equivalent (FTE) basis)
- Student–teacher ratio: 12.30 (2009-10)
- Athletic conference: UIL Class 4A Football & Basketball
- District mascot: Warriors
- Colors: Purple and white

Other information
- TEA District Accountability Rating for 2011-12: Academically Acceptable
- Website: Bonham ISD

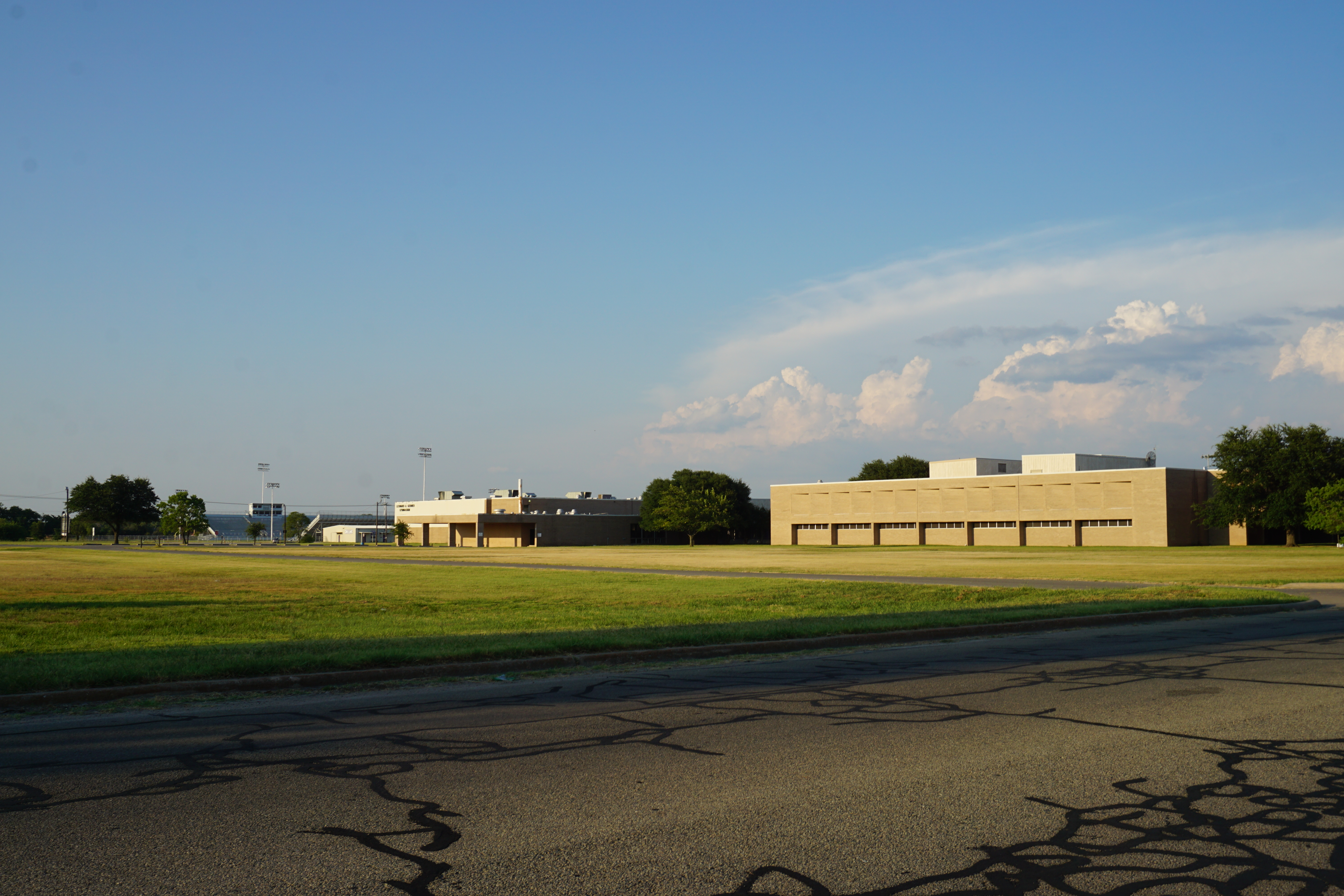
Bonham High School

Bonham Independent School District is a public school district based in Bonham, Texas, United States. In addition to Bonham, the district also serves the cities of Bailey and Ravenna.

The district operates one high school, Bonham High School.

== Finances ==
As of the 2010–2011 school year, the appraised valuation of property in the district was $539,384,000. The maintenance tax rate was $0.104 and the bond tax rate was $0.008 per $100 of appraised valuation.

== Academic achievement ==
In 2011, the school district was rated "academically acceptable" by the Texas Education Agency; 49% of districts in Texas in 2011 received the same rating. No state accountability ratings will be given to districts in 2012. A school district in Texas can receive one of four possible rankings from the Texas Education Agency: Exemplary (the highest possible ranking), Recognized, Academically Acceptable, and Academically Unacceptable (the lowest possible ranking).

Historical district TEA accountability ratings

- 2013: Met Standard
- 2012: No Rating Given
- 2011: Academically Acceptable
- 2010: Recognized
- 2009: Academically Acceptable
- 2008: Academically Acceptable
- 2007: Academically Acceptable
- 2006: Academically Acceptable
- 2005: Academically Acceptable
- 2004: Academically Acceptable

== Schools ==
Bonham ISD operates six schools.

=== Regular instructional ===
- Bonham High School (grades 9-12)
- L.H. Rather Junior High School (grades 7-8)
- I.W. Evans Intermediate School (grades 4-6)
- Finley-Oates Elementary School (kindergarten - grade 3)
- Fannin County Head Start (prekindergarten)

=== DAEP instructional ===
- Special Assignment Center (grades 5-12)

== See also ==
- List of school districts in Texas
- List of high schools in Texas
