= Dodd City Independent School District =

School district in Texas, United States

Dodd City Independent School District is a public school district based in Dodd City, Texas (USA). The district has two schools, Dodd City High School, serving grades 7-12, and Dodd City Elementary School, serving grades PK-6. Originally only had one school PK-12

In 2009, the school district was rated "academically acceptable" by the Texas Education Agency.
