= Hilger, Texas =

- Unincorporated community
- Location within Texas Location within the United States
- Coordinates: 33°37′19″N 96°05′49″W
- Country: United States
- State: Texas
- County: Fannin
- Elevation: 587 ft (179 m)
- Time zone: UTC-6 (Central (CST))
  - Summer (DST): UTC-5 (CDT)
- Area codes: 903 & 430
- GNIS feature ID: 1379933

Hilger is an unincorporated community in Fannin County, Texas, United States.
