= Fannin County, Texas =

County in Texas, United States

- County
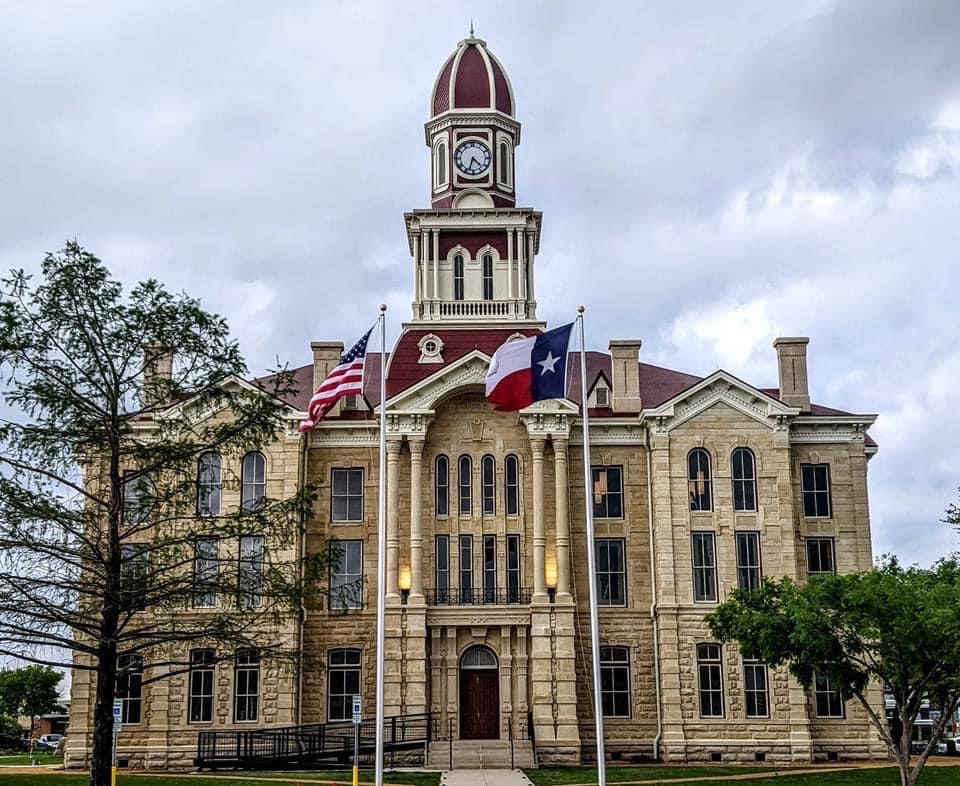
- Fannin County Courthouse in Bonham

- Location within the U.S. state of Texas
- Coordinates: 33°35′N 96°07′W
- Country: United States
- State: Texas
- Founded: 1838
- Named for: James Fannin
- Seat: Bonham
- Largest city: Bonham

Area
  - Total: 899 sq mi (2,330 km^{2})
  - Land: 891 sq mi (2,310 km^{2})
  - Water: 8.0 sq mi (21 km^{2}) 0.9%

Population (2020)
  - Total: 35,662
  - Estimate (2025): 39,265 ▲
  - Density: 40.0/sq mi (15.5/km^{2})
- Time zone: UTC−6 (Central)
  - Summer (DST): UTC−5 (CDT)
- Congressional district: 4th
- Website: www.co.fannin.tx.us

Fannin County is a county in the U.S. state of Texas, on the border with Oklahoma. Fannin is located at the western edge of Northeast Texas.

As of the 2020 census, its population was 35,662, making it the 87th-most populous county in Texas. The entirety of Fannin County is a part of the Bonham micropolitan statistical area and the Dallas-Fort Worth combined statistical area. The county seat is Bonham.

== History ==
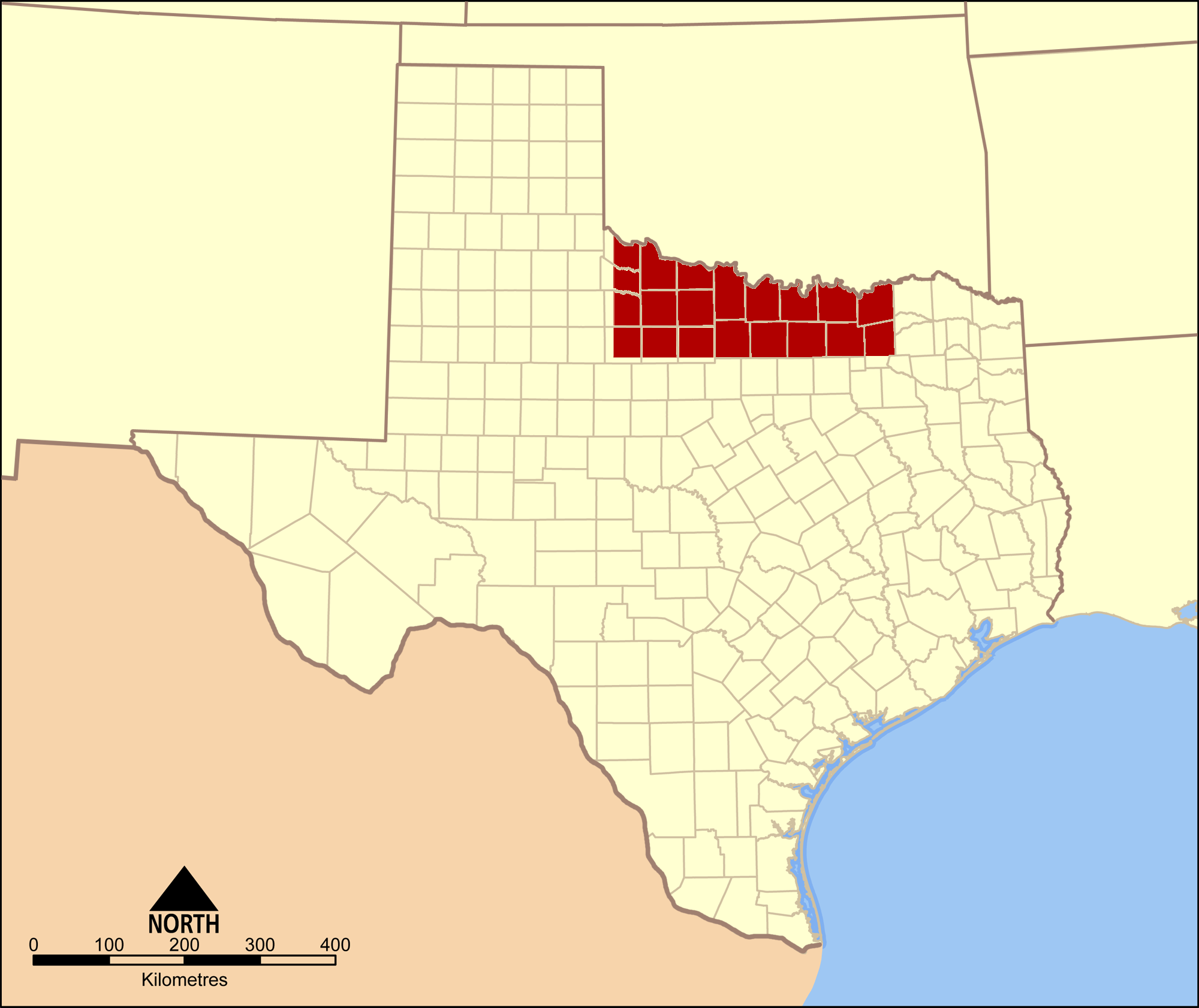
Map of Fannin County in 1840 overlaid onto modern Texas counties

The county was named for James Fannin, who commanded the group of Texans killed in the Goliad Massacre during the Texas Revolution. James Bonham (the county seat's namesake) sought Fannin's assistance for the Battle of the Alamo, but Fannin was unable to provide it.

The county was created in 1837 and organized the next year. Fannin County is a part of the Texoma region.

== Geography ==
Fannin County is located in Northeast Texas.

According to the U.S. Census Bureau, the county has a total area of 899 square miles (2,330 km^{2}), of which 8.0 square miles (21 km^{2}) (0.9%) are covered by water. It is drained by Bois d'Arc Creek and Sulphur River.

=== Major highways ===
- U.S. Highway 69
- U.S. Highway 82
- State Highway 11
- State Highway 34
- State Highway 50
- State Highway 56
- State Highway 78
- State Highway 121
- Loop 205
- Loop 391
- Spur 311

=== Adjacent counties ===
- Bryan County, Oklahoma (north)
- Lamar County (east)
- Delta County (southeast)
- Hunt County (south)
- Collin County (southwest)
- Grayson County (west)

=== National protected area ===
- Caddo National Grassland

== Demographics ==
Historical population
Census	Pop.	Note	%±
1850	3,788		—
1860	9,217		143.3%
1870	13,207		43.3%
1880	25,501		93.1%
1890	38,709		51.8%
1900	51,793		33.8%
1910	44,801		−13.5%
1920	48,186		7.6%
1930	41,163		−14.6%
1940	41,064		−0.2%
1950	31,253		−23.9%
1960	23,880		−23.6%
1970	22,705		−4.9%
1980	24,285		7.0%
1990	24,804		2.1%
2000	31,242		26.0%
2010	33,915		8.6%
2020	35,662		5.2%
2025 (est.)	39,265	▲	10.1%
U.S. Decennial Census; 1850–2010 2010–2014; County Information Program

=== Racial and ethnic composition ===
Fannin County, Texas – Racial and ethnic composition Note: the US Census treats Hispanic/Latino as an ethnic category. This table excludes Latinos from the racial categories and assigns them to a separate category. Hispanics/Latinos may be of any race.
Race / Ethnicity (NH = Non-Hispanic)	Pop 1980	Pop 1990	Pop 2000	Pop 2010	Pop 2020	% 1980	% 1990	% 2000	% 2010	% 2020
White alone (NH)	22,068	22,466	26,298	27,433	27,042	90.87%	90.57%	84.18%	80.89%	75.83%
Black or African American alone (NH)	1,782	1,623	2,482	2,273	2,199	7.34%	6.54%	7.94%	6.70%	6.17%
Native American or Alaska Native alone (NH)	61	172	234	294	309	0.25%	0.69%	0.75%	0.87%	0.87%
Asian alone (NH)	26	53	81	122	145	0.11%	0.21%	0.26%	0.36%	0.41%
Native Hawaiian or Pacific Islander alone (NH)	x	x	7	6	20	x	x	0.02%	0.02%	0.06%
Other race alone (NH)	24	5	14	23	112	0.10%	0.02%	0.04%	0.07%	0.31%
Mixed race or Multiracial (NH)	x	x	373	538	1,617	x	x	1.19%	1.59%	4.53%
Hispanic or Latino (any race)	324	485	1,753	3,226	4,218	1.33%	1.96%	5.61%	9.51%	11.83%
Total	24,285	24,804	31,242	33,915	35,662	100.00%	100.00%	100.00%	100.00%	100.00%

=== 2000 census ===
As of the 2000 census, 31,242 people, 11,105 households, and 7,984 families resided in the county. The population density was 35 people per square mile (14 people/km^{2}). The 12,887 housing units averaged 14 units per square mile (5.4/km^{2}). The racial makeup of the county was 86.56% White, 7.96% African American, 0.92% Native American, 0.26% Asian, 2.81% from other races, and 1.49% from two or more races. About 5.61% of the population was Hispanic or Latino of any race. As of 2015, the largest self-reported ancestry groups were 48.50% English, 16.10% Welsh, 11.00% German, and 7.25% Irish.

Of the 11,105 households, 31.1% had children under 18 living with them, 57.9% were married couples living together, 10.3% had a female householder with no husband present, and 28.1% were not families. About 25.2% of all households were made up of individuals, and 12.7% had someone living alone who was 65 or older. The average household size was 2.51, and the average family size was 2.99.

In the county, the population was distributed as 23.2% under 18, 8.9% from 18 to 24, 28.6% from 25 to 44, 23.2% from 45 to 64, and 16.1% who were 65 or older. The median age was 38 years. For every 100 females, there were 113.8 males. For every 100 females age 18 and over, there were 116.9 males.

The median income for a household in the county was $34,501 and for a family was $42,193. Males had a median income of $31,140 versus $23,101 for females. The per capita income for the county was $16,066. About 9.90% of families and 13.90% of the population were below the poverty line, including 17.70% of those under 18 and 16.50% of those 65 or over.

== Communities ==
=== Cities ===
- Bailey
- Bonham (county seat)
- Ector
- Honey Grove
- Leonard
- Pecan Gap (mostly in Delta County)
- Ravenna
- Savoy
- Trenton (small part in Grayson County)

=== Towns ===
- Dodd City
- Ladonia
- Whitewright (mostly in Grayson County)
- Windom

=== Unincorporated communities ===
- Bug Tussle
- Duplex
- Elwood
- Gober
- Hilger
- Ivanhoe
- Mulberry
- Randolph
- Telephone
- Warren

== Education ==
These independent school districts (ISDs) serve Fannin County:

- Blue Ridge ISD (mostly in Collin County, small portion in Fannin County)
- Bonham ISD
- Dodd City ISD
- Ector ISD
- Fannindel ISD
- Honey Grove ISD
- Leonard ISD
- North Lamar ISD (mostly in Lamar County, small portion in Fannin County)
- Sam Rayburn ISD
- Savoy ISD
- Trenton ISD (mostly in Fannin County, small portion in Grayson County)
- Whitewright ISD (mostly in Grayson County, small portion in Fannin County)
- Wolfe City ISD (mostly in Hunt County, small portion in Fannin County)

Additionally, nearby Grayson College, Paris Junior College, and East Texas A&M University provide postsecondary education in the area.

As per the Texas Education Code, Grayson College's service area includes parts of the county in these ISDs: Bonham, Dodd City, Ector, Leonard, Sam Rayburn, Savoy, Trenton, Whitewright, and Wolfe City. The Fannindel ISD portion and the Honey Grove ISD portion are in the service area of Paris Junior College. The code does not specify a community college for the Blue Ridge ISD and North Lamar ISD areas.

== Politics ==
Once a Democratic stronghold for decades (in large part as it was the home of longtime United States Speaker of the House Sam Rayburn), Fannin County has shifted heavily toward the Republican Party since the 1990s. As a sign of this trend, Republican candidates for president have won an ever-increasing share of the vote in each of the seven presidential elections, starting in 1996.

Fannin County is located within District 62 of the Texas House of Representatives. Fannin County is located within District 1 of the Texas Senate.

United States presidential election results for Fannin County, Texas
Year	Republican		Democratic		Third party(ies)	
Year	No.	%	No.	%	No.	%
1912	227	7.25%	2,661	85.04%	241	7.70%
1916	471	11.19%	3,493	82.99%	245	5.82%
1920	1,103	21.29%	3,461	66.79%	618	11.93%
1924	653	10.11%	5,596	86.60%	213	3.30%
1928	2,122	45.62%	2,525	54.29%	4	0.09%
1932	460	7.91%	5,338	91.80%	17	0.29%
1936	368	6.55%	5,242	93.32%	7	0.12%
1940	792	9.57%	7,478	90.36%	6	0.07%
1944	677	9.45%	5,984	83.54%	502	7.01%
1948	553	7.83%	6,132	86.79%	380	5.38%
1952	2,099	28.12%	5,363	71.84%	3	0.04%
1956	1,910	29.75%	4,504	70.16%	6	0.09%
1960	1,844	30.04%	4,282	69.76%	12	0.20%
1964	1,219	16.93%	5,976	83.00%	5	0.07%
1968	1,585	22.08%	3,931	54.77%	1,661	23.14%
1972	3,826	61.90%	2,295	37.13%	60	0.97%
1976	2,102	26.32%	5,845	73.20%	38	0.48%
1980	3,196	37.12%	5,284	61.36%	131	1.52%
1984	4,692	51.53%	4,399	48.31%	15	0.16%
1988	4,024	43.67%	5,163	56.03%	27	0.29%
1992	2,510	26.11%	4,164	43.31%	2,941	30.59%
1996	3,495	39.73%	4,276	48.61%	1,025	11.65%
2000	6,074	58.74%	4,102	39.67%	164	1.59%
2004	7,893	65.99%	4,001	33.45%	66	0.55%
2008	8,092	69.20%	3,464	29.62%	138	1.18%
2012	8,161	75.54%	2,486	23.01%	157	1.45%
2016	9,548	79.28%	2,132	17.70%	364	3.02%
2020	12,171	81.10%	2,655	17.69%	181	1.21%
2024	13,648	83.24%	2,607	15.90%	140	0.85%

United States Senate election results for Fannin County, Texas1
Year	Republican		Democratic		Third party(ies)	
Year	No.	%	No.	%	No.	%
2024	13,084	80.08%	2,927	17.92%	327	2.00%

United States Senate election results for Fannin County, Texas2
Year	Republican		Democratic		Third party(ies)	
Year	No.	%	No.	%	No.	%
2020	11,836	80.25%	2,559	17.35%	354	2.40%

Texas Gubernatorial election results for Fannin County
Year	Republican		Democratic		Third party(ies)	
Year	No.	%	No.	%	No.	%
2022	9,694	83.10%	1,831	15.70%	140	1.20%

== See also ==
- National Register of Historic Places listings in Fannin County, Texas
- Recorded Texas Historic Landmarks in Fannin County
