= Bonham, Texas =

- City
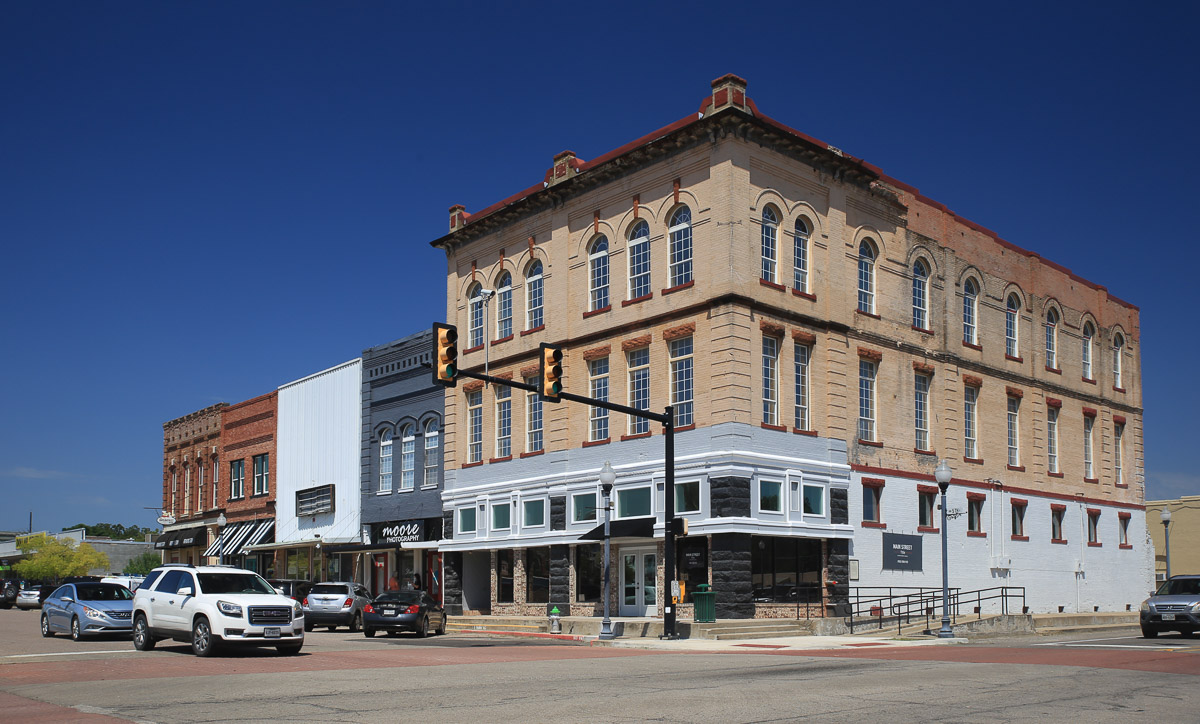
- Downtown Bonham, Texas (2020)
- Motto: "The Star of North Texas"
- Interactive map of Bonham, Texas
- Coordinates: 33°35′17″N 96°11′24″W
- Country: United States
- State: Texas
- County: Fannin
- Named for: James Bonham

Area
  - Total: 9.83 sq mi (25.47 km^{2})
  - Land: 9.83 sq mi (25.47 km^{2})
  - Water: 0 sq mi (0.00 km^{2})
- Elevation: 614 ft (187 m)

Population (2020)
  - Total: 10,408
  - Density: 1,058/sq mi (408.6/km^{2})
- Time zone: UTC-6 (Central (CST))
  - Summer (DST): UTC-5 (CDT)
- ZIP code: 75418
- Area codes: 430, 903
- FIPS code: 48-09328
- GNIS feature ID: 2409878
- Website: www.cityofbonham.org

Bonham is a city in and the county seat of Fannin County, Texas, United States. Its population was 10,408 at the 2020 census. James Bonham (the city's namesake) sought the aid of James Fannin (the county's namesake) at the Battle of the Alamo. Bonham is part of the Texoma region in northern Texas and southern Oklahoma.

== History ==
One of Texas's oldest cities, Bonham dates to 1837, when Bailey Inglish built a two-story blockhouse, named Fort Inglish, about 2 miles (3 km) from the current downtown. Inglish and other acquaintances settled there in the summer of 1837, and the settlement was named "Bois d'Arc". The Congress of the Republic of Texas named the city Bloomington in 1843, but renamed it Bonham in honor of James Butler Bonham, a defender of the Alamo. On February 2, 1848, Bonham was incorporated as a city. A 1936 statue of Bonham by Texas sculptor Allie Tennant is on the courthouse grounds.

After connecting to the Texas and Pacific Railway, the city began to grow, and by 1885, the city had six churches, three colleges, two public schools, three weekly newspapers, a sawmill, two grain mills, a power plant, and about 2,300 inhabitants. In 1890, streetcars and an ice plant were added, and the Texas Power and Light Company, the area's utility provider, began service. In 1925, the city was connected to natural gas lines.

In 1898, 1911–1914, and 1921–1922, Bonham hosted minor league baseball. The Bonham Boosters and other Bonham teams played as members of the Class D Texas-Oklahoma League (1911–1914, 1921–1922) and the independent Southwestern League (1898). Bonham teams featured a different moniker each season. Baseball Hall of Fame member Kid Nichols was the manager of the 1914 Bonham Sliders.

During the Second World War, a training camp and an aviation school for the United States Army Air Forces were in the vicinity of Bonham, as was a prisoner-of-war camp for German soldiers. Parts of the camp, about 0.5 miles north of US 82, can still be visited today.

== Geography ==
According to the U.S. Census Bureau, Bonham has a total area of 9.8 square miles (25.3 km^{2}), all land.

=== Climate ===
Bonham's climate is characterized by hot, humid summers and mild to cool winters. According to the Köppen climate classification, Bonham has a humid subtropical climate, Cfa on climate maps.

Climate data for Bonham, Texas (1991–2020 normals, extremes 1903–present)
Month	Jan	Feb	Mar	Apr	May	Jun	Jul	Aug	Sep	Oct	Nov	Dec	Year
Record high °F (°C)	82 (28)	92 (33)	96 (36)	98 (37)	104 (40)	108 (42)	112 (44)	115 (46)	109 (43)	103 (39)	89 (32)	86 (30)	115 (46)
Mean daily maximum °F (°C)	52.9 (11.6)	57.3 (14.1)	65.2 (18.4)	73.4 (23.0)	80.6 (27.0)	88.9 (31.6)	93.6 (34.2)	93.8 (34.3)	86.9 (30.5)	76.5 (24.7)	64.5 (18.1)	54.9 (12.7)	74.0 (23.3)
Daily mean °F (°C)	42.8 (6.0)	46.7 (8.2)	54.4 (12.4)	62.4 (16.9)	71.0 (21.7)	79.3 (26.3)	83.5 (28.6)	83.1 (28.4)	75.8 (24.3)	64.8 (18.2)	53.4 (11.9)	44.8 (7.1)	63.5 (17.5)
Mean daily minimum °F (°C)	32.7 (0.4)	36.0 (2.2)	43.6 (6.4)	51.4 (10.8)	61.4 (16.3)	69.6 (20.9)	73.4 (23.0)	72.4 (22.4)	64.8 (18.2)	53.2 (11.8)	42.3 (5.7)	34.8 (1.6)	53.0 (11.7)
Record low °F (°C)	−5 (−21)	−5 (−21)	9 (−13)	22 (−6)	32 (0)	48 (9)	52 (11)	52 (11)	34 (1)	19 (−7)	8 (−13)	−4 (−20)	−5 (−21)
Average precipitation inches (mm)	2.81 (71)	3.10 (79)	4.30 (109)	4.01 (102)	4.94 (125)	4.46 (113)	3.21 (82)	2.89 (73)	4.07 (103)	4.58 (116)	3.48 (88)	3.66 (93)	45.51 (1,156)
Average snowfall inches (cm)	0.3 (0.76)	0.5 (1.3)	0.0 (0.0)	0.0 (0.0)	0.0 (0.0)	0.0 (0.0)	0.0 (0.0)	0.0 (0.0)	0.0 (0.0)	0.0 (0.0)	0.0 (0.0)	0.3 (0.76)	1.1 (2.8)
Average precipitation days (≥ 0.01 in)	6.1	6.9	7.9	6.8	8.4	6.8	4.9	4.7	5.5	6.1	5.5	6.0	75.6
Average snowy days (≥ 0.1 in)	0.1	0.2	0.0	0.0	0.0	0.0	0.0	0.0	0.0	0.0	0.0	0.1	0.4
Source: NOAA

== Demographics ==
Historical population
Census	Pop.	Note	%±
1850	211		—
1860	477		126.1%
1870	928		94.5%
1880	1,889		103.6%
1890	3,361		77.9%
1900	5,042		50.0%
1910	4,844		−3.9%
1920	6,008		24.0%
1930	5,655		−5.9%
1940	6,349		12.3%
1950	7,049		11.0%
1960	7,357		4.4%
1970	7,698		4.6%
1980	7,338		−4.7%
1990	6,686		−8.9%
2000	9,990		49.4%
2010	10,127		1.4%
2020	10,408		2.8%
U.S. Decennial Census

=== 2020 census ===
As of the 2020 census, Bonham had a population of 10,408, 3,073 households, and 1,696 families. The population density was 1,067.1 inhabitants per square mile (412.0/km^{2}), and there were 3,400 housing units.

74.8% of residents lived in urban areas, while 25.2% lived in rural areas.

The median age was 37.5 years, 17.9% of residents were under the age of 18, and 16.8% were 65 years of age or older. For every 100 females there were 158.3 males, and for every 100 females age 18 and over there were 170.5 males age 18 and over.

Of the 3,073 households, 29.1% had children under the age of 18 living in them, 39.2% were married-couple households, 21.1% were households with a male householder and no spouse or partner present, and 32.9% were households with a female householder and no spouse or partner present. About 33.7% of all households were made up of individuals, and 17.7% had someone living alone who was 65 years of age or older. The average household size was 2.4 and the average family size was 3.05.

Of the 3,400 housing units, 9.6% were vacant. Among occupied housing units, 53.6% were owner-occupied and 46.4% were renter-occupied. The homeowner vacancy rate was 2.5% and the rental vacancy rate was 5.4%.

Racial composition as of the 2020 census
Race	Percent
White	68.5%
Black or African American	14.5%
American Indian and Alaska Native	1.1%
Asian	0.8%
Native Hawaiian and Other Pacific Islander	0.1%
Some other race	8.7%
Two or more races	6.2%
Hispanic or Latino (of any race)	17.6%

=== 2010 census ===
In the city, the age distribution was 21.0% under 18, 9.0% from 28 to 24, 31.0% from 25 to 44, 23.5% from 45 to 64, and 15.2% who were 65 or older. The median age was 36 years. The median income for a household in the city was $43,793, and for a family was $52,334. Males had a median income of $26,035 versus $21,897 for females. The per capita income for the city was $24,874. About 14.9% of the population were below the poverty line.

== Education ==
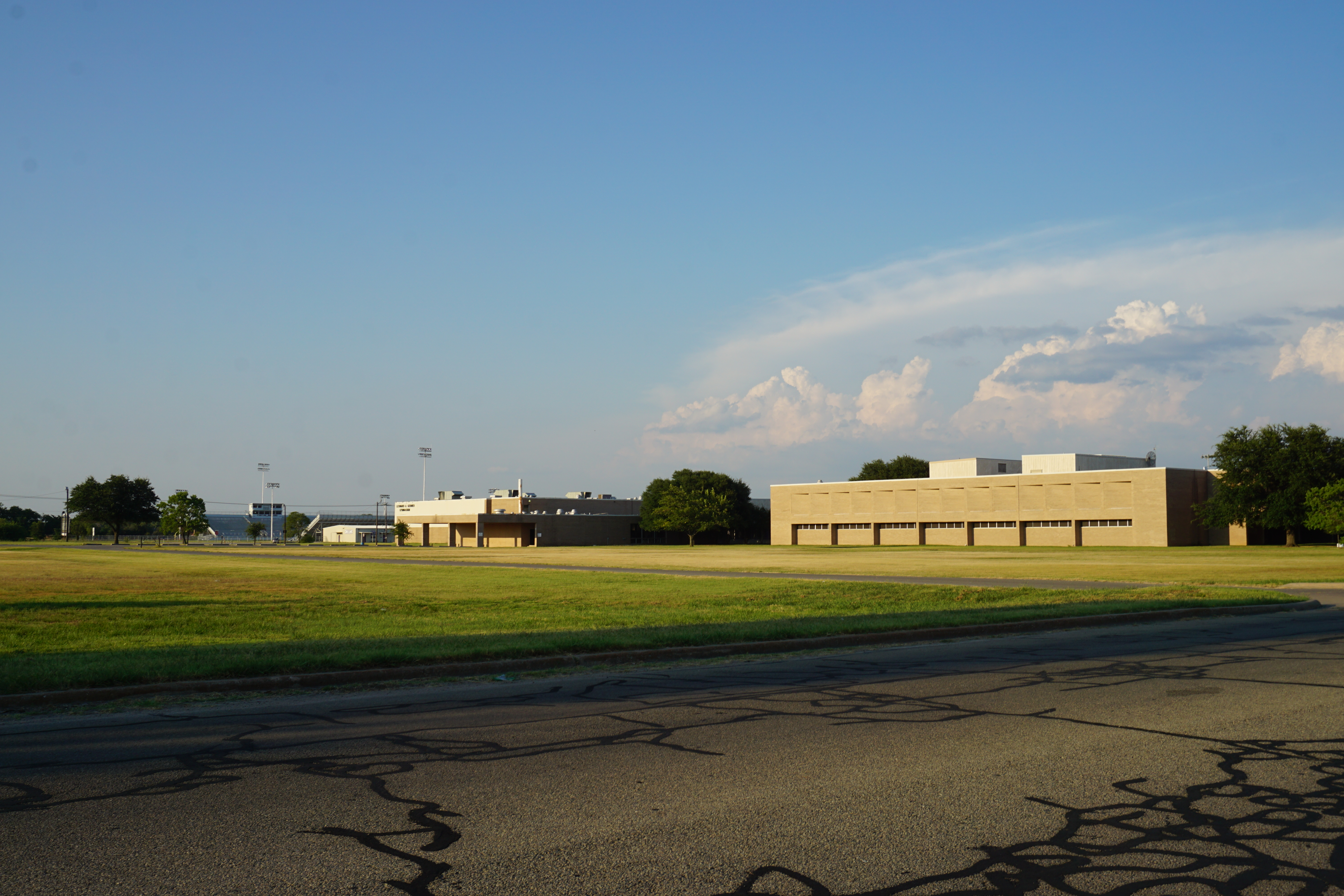
Bonham High School

The city is served by the Bonham Independent School District. The city's high school is Bonham High School.

Grayson County College operated a branch campus in Bonham until 2012.

== Infrastructure ==
Highways in the Bonham area include U.S. Route 82, Texas State Highway 78, Texas State Highway 56, and Texas State Highway 121.

== Notable people ==
- Homer Blankenship, Major League Baseball (MLB) pitcher of 1920s
- Ted Blankenship, MLB pitcher of 1920s
- Charlie Christian, pioneering jazz guitarist
- Charlie Cole, photojournalist, known for his photo of the Tank Man during the Tiananmen Square protests of 1989
- Roberta Dodd Crawford, lyric soprano and voice instructor
- Danny Darwin, MLB pitcher
- Karen Dalton, folk blues singer
- John Wesley Hardin, well-known outlaw and gunfighter in late 19th-century Texas
- Durwood Keeton, American football player
- Kenny Marchant, congressman, Texas 24th District
- Joe Melson, BMI Award-winning songwriter for Roy Orbison
- Tom McBride, MLB outfielder
- Roy McMillan, Cincinnati Reds All-Star shortstop
- Jerry Moore, former head coach of Appalachian State Mountaineers football team
- Joe Morgan, Baseball Hall of Fame second baseman
- Sam Rayburn, politician, former speaker of the U.S. House of Representatives
- James Tague, writer and a key witness to the assassination of President John F. Kennedy
- B. A. Wilson, NASCAR driver
