= Charlie Johnson (offensive lineman) =

American football player (born 1984)

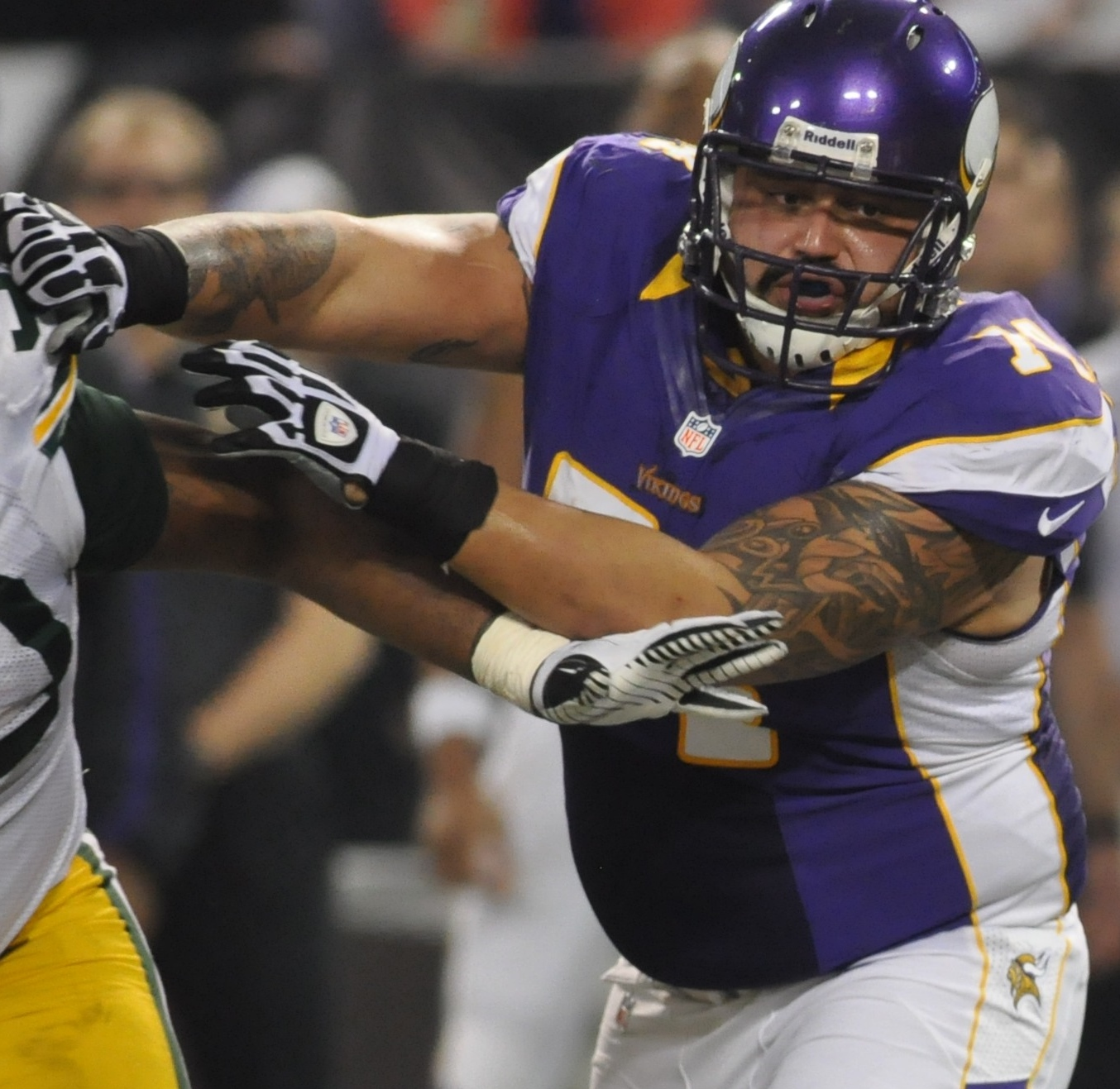
- Johnson with the Minnesota Vikings in 2012

No. 74
- Position: Guard

Personal information
- Born: May 2, 1984 (age 42); Durant, Oklahoma, U.S.
- Listed height: 6 ft 4 in (1.93 m)
- Listed weight: 305 lb (138 kg)

Career information
- High school: Sherman (Sherman, Texas)
- College: Oklahoma State
- NFL draft: 2006: 6th round, 199th overall pick

Career history
- Indianapolis Colts (2006–2010); Minnesota Vikings (2011–2014)

Awards and highlights
- Super Bowl champion (XLI)

Career NFL statistics
- Games played: 134
- Games started: 115
- Stats at Pro Football Reference

Charles Edward Johnson (born May 2, 1984) is an American former professional football player who was a guard in the National Football League (NFL). He played college football for the Oklahoma State Cowboys, and was selected by the Indianapolis Colts in the sixth round of the 2006 NFL draft. He won Super Bowl XLI with the Colts against the Chicago Bears.

== Early life ==
Johnson attended Sherman High School in Sherman, Texas, the same high school former Colts' punter Hunter Smith attended. At Oklahoma State, he was converted from a tight end to an offensive tackle.

== Professional career ==
Pre-draft measurables
| Height | Weight |
|---|---|
| 6 ft 3 3/4 in (1.92 m) | 298 lb (135 kg) |
Values from Pro Day

=== Indianapolis Colts ===
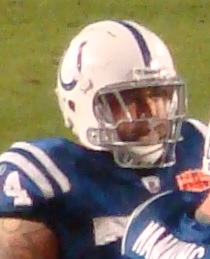
Johnson during Super Bowl XLIV.

Johnson was selected with the Indianapolis Colts' sixth-round pick in the 2006 NFL draft. As a rookie, he started one game, filling in for the injured right tackle Ryan Diem against Tennessee in week 13, and, additionally, filled in for Diem for a portion of Super Bowl XLI.

Due to the retirement of stalwart left tackle Tarik Glenn, Johnson had an opportunity to win the starting left tackle job during his second season, but was beaten out by rookie Tony Ugoh. Injuries to Ugoh and Diem, however, led to Johnson starting 10 of 16 games at LT and RT, respectively. Johnson's performance during 2007 was widely viewed by fans as a disappointment (that season marked the first time in five years that the Colts finished out of the top 5 in least sacks allowed), considering the competence he had shown as a rookie.

In Johnson's third season, he was moved to left guard in order to compensate for the loss of injured starter Ryan Lilja. Johnson started all 16 games, 12 at LG and 4 at LT, and was one of only two starting OL (the other being Ryan Diem) to play in every game that season.

The following year, Johnson beat out underachieving starter Tony Ugoh for the starting LT position during training camp. Through six games, Johnson had demonstrated solid improvement in his position, in contrast to previous years' performances.

=== Minnesota Vikings ===
On August 1, 2011, Johnson signed with the Minnesota Vikings. He played left tackle in his first full season with the Vikings but was then moved to left guard after the team drafted tackle Matt Kalil from USC.

On February 27, 2015, Johnson was released by the Vikings.

== Personal life ==
On December 18, 2012, Johnson appeared on an episode of Ink Master, where he received a tattoo of a dragon on his right forearm by contestant Tatu Baby. Since 2017, he has been the offensive coordinator and offensive line coach for Stillwater High School in Stillwater, Oklahoma.
