= Dennis Boyd (American football) =

American football player (born 1955)

No. 68
- Positions: Defensive tackle, defensive end, offensive tackle

Personal information
- Born: November 5, 1955 (age 71); Washington, D.C., U.S.
- Listed height: 6 ft 6 in (1.98 m)
- Listed weight: 255 lb (116 kg)

Career information
- High school: Douglas (Winston, Oregon)
- College: Oregon State
- NFL draft: 1977: 3rd round, 58th overall pick

Career history
- Seattle Seahawks (1977–1979); Seattle Seahawks (1981–1982)

Awards and highlights
- Second-team All-Pac-8 (1976)

Career NFL statistics
- Games played: 59
- Games started: 27
- Fumble recoveries: 4
- Stats at Pro Football Reference

Dennis Boyd (born November 5, 1955) is an American former professional football player for the Seattle Seahawks of the National Football League (NFL) from 1977 to 1982. He played college football for the Oregon State Beavers before being selected in the third round of the 1977 NFL draft with the 58th overall pick. He played for the Seahawks in 59 games over five seasons.
