= Hunter Smith =

American football player (born 1977)

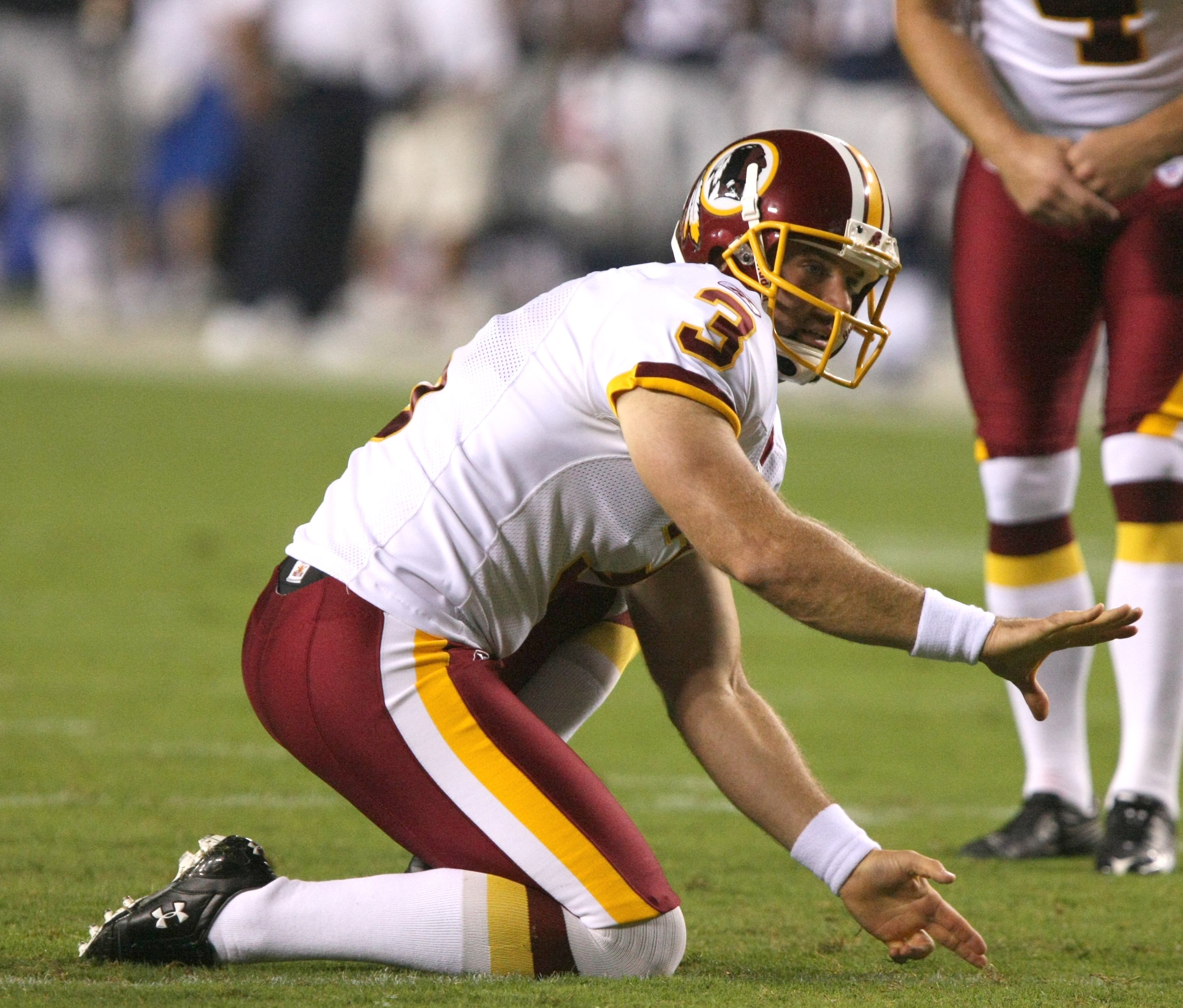
- Smith with the Washington Redskins, 2009

Member of the Indiana House of Representatives from the 24th district
- In office November 19, 2024 – November 4, 2026
- Preceded by: Donna Schaibley

Personal details
- Born: Hunter Dwight Smith; August 9, 1977 (age 49) Sherman, Texas, U.S.
- Party: Republican
- Spouse: Jennifer Smith
- Children: 4
- Education: University of Notre Dame (BS)
- Football career

No. 17, 3
- Position: Punter

Personal information
- Listed height: 6 ft 2 in (1.88 m)
- Listed weight: 209 lb (95 kg)

Career information
- High school: Sherman
- College: Notre Dame
- NFL draft: 1999: 7th round, 210th overall pick

Career history
- Indianapolis Colts (1999–2008); Washington Redskins (2009–2010)

Awards and highlights
- Super Bowl champion (XLI); PFW / PFWA All-Rookie Team (1999)

Career NFL statistics
- Punts: 691
- Punting yards: 24,500
- Punting average: 43.0
- Stats at Pro Football Reference

Hunter Dwight Smith (born August 9, 1977) is an American former professional football player who was a punter in the National Football League (NFL). He was selected by the Indianapolis Colts in the seventh round of the 1999 NFL draft. He played college football for the Notre Dame Fighting Irish.

Smith earned a Super Bowl ring with the Colts in Super Bowl XLI as they beat the Chicago Bears. He is currently the representative for House District 24 of the Indiana House of Representatives.

== Early life ==
Smith attended Sherman High School in Sherman, Texas and was a letterman in football, basketball, and track. In football, he saw action as a quarterback, tight end, punter, and kicker, and was a two-time Texas All-State selection.

== College career ==
Smith played in all 45 career games for the University of Notre Dame over the course of his four seasons. He also handled all field goal holding duties. He ranks third on the schools career record list with 174 total punts and second on career yardage with an average of 41.2 yards per punt. Originally recruited as a QB, Smith also handled the emergency quarterback role. In both 1998 and 1999, Smith was Football News All-Independent first-team. Smith also joined the track and field team at Notre Dame as a high jumper. Hunter graduated from Notre Dame in 1999 with degrees in Theology and Sociology.

== Professional career ==
Pre-draft measurables
Height	Weight
6 ft 1 3/8 in (1.86 m)	212 lb (96 kg)
Values from NFL Combine

During his rookie season in 1999, he was selected to the NFL All-Rookie Team and was named Pro Bowl Alternate 3 times throughout his career.

Smith was named AFC special teams player of the week while playing for Indianapolis in 2005.

Smith threw a touchdown pass for the Washington Redskins against the Denver Broncos on November 15, 2009. The 35-yard pass went to the fullback, Mike Sellers. Smith was subsequently named the NFC special teams player of the week. He had previously run for an 8-yard touchdown against the New York Giants in the season's first game, making him the first special-teams player in NFL history to run and pass for a TD in the same season. He has scored three touchdowns in his NFL career.

On October 7, 2010, the Redskins signed Smith after a season-ending injury to Josh Bidwell.

On December 14, 2010, the Redskins cut Smith after botching an extra point attempt, a result of him allowing the snap pass through his hands as he held for kicker Graham Gano. At the time, the Redskins trailed the Tampa Bay Buccaneers 17–16 with nine seconds to play in the fourth quarter. The Redskins lost the game.

== Political career ==
In December 2023, Smith announced his bid to run for the Indiana House of Representatives. In District 24 he won the 2024 Republican primary with 61% of the vote. He faced Josh Lowry in the general election. Smith beat his opponent capturing 56% of the vote.

Smith lost reelection to Democrat Racheal Bleicher in the November 3, 2026 general election.

== Personal life ==
Smith, a devout Christian, is a member of the band Connersvine. Connersvine has an acoustic-driven rock sound. Made up of Chris Wilson and Smith, the acoustic duo sings about their religious faith, both recorded and live, sometimes on their own, and often time with a full band. "The Hunter Smith Band" is the name of the full ensemble.

In 2005, he wrote and performed a song on the Bob and Tom Show, titled "The Most Accurate Holder to Ever Play the Game," referring to his holding duties for former Colts kicker Mike Vanderjagt.

In 2007, Connersvine performed in Houston at the Cynthia Woods Mitchell Pavilion as part of a 25th anniversary celebration for Christian radio station KSBJ. The evening began with their performance followed by TobyMac and MercyMe among other artists. He and his wife, Jennifer, and their four kids, Josiah, Samuel, Lydia, and Beau reside in Zionsville, IN.

Smith published a book in 2012, The Jersey Effect: Beyond the World Championship, which is about several Colt players who played in Super Bowl XLI, examining their championship success and battles they faced too. He is now the lead singer in The Hunter Smith Band.
