= Troy Polamalu =

American football player and executive (born 1981)

- Polamalu in 2011

No. 43
- Position: Safety

Personal information
- Born: April 19, 1981 (age 45); Garden Grove, California, U.S.
- Listed height: 5 ft 10 in (1.78 m)
- Listed weight: 207 lb (94 kg)

Career information
- High school: Douglas (Winston, Oregon)
- College: USC (1999–2002)
- NFL draft: 2003: 1st round, 16th overall pick

Career history

Playing
- Pittsburgh Steelers (2003–2014)

Operations
- Alliance of American Football (2019) Head of player relations

Awards and highlights
- 2× Super Bowl champion (XL, XLIII); NFL Defensive Player of the Year (2010); 4× First-team All-Pro (2005, 2008, 2010, 2011); 2× Second-team All-Pro (2004, 2007); 8× Pro Bowl (2004–2008, 2010, 2011, 2013); NFL 2000s All-Decade Team; Pittsburgh Steelers All-Time Team; Pittsburgh Steelers Hall of Honor; Consensus All-American (2002); First-team All-American (2001); 2× First-team All-Pac-10 (2001, 2002)

Career NFL statistics
- Tackles: 783
- Sacks: 12.0
- Interceptions: 32
- Forced fumbles: 14
- Defensive touchdowns: 5
- Pass deflections: 107
- Stats at Pro Football Reference
- Pro Football Hall of Fame
- College Football Hall of Fame

Troy Aumua Polamalu (/ˌpoʊləˈmɑːluː/; born Troy Benjamin Aumua; April 19, 1981) is an American former professional football player who spent his entire 12-year career as a safety for the Pittsburgh Steelers of the National Football League (NFL). An eight-time Pro Bowl and six-time All-Pro selection, he was inducted into the Pro Football Hall of Fame in 2020, his first year of eligibility.

Polamalu played college football for the USC Trojans, earning consensus All-American honors in 2002. He was chosen by the Steelers in the first round of the 2003 NFL draft. He was a member of two Steelers' Super Bowl championship teams and was the NFL Defensive Player of the Year in 2010, helping them to another Super Bowl appearance. He was also the head of player relations of the Alliance of American Football. Known for his "range, explosiveness, and impact on the field," Polamalu is widely considered one of the greatest safeties in NFL history, and is credited with playing a key role in the Steelers' success during the 2000s.

== Early life ==
Polamalu was born in Garden Grove, California. His mother is Suila Polamalu. Polamalu is of American Samoan descent. He is the youngest of five children. His father left the family soon after Polamalu was born. Polamalu spent his early years in Santa Ana, California. At age eight, Polamalu vacationed in Tenmile, Oregon with his aunt and uncle for three weeks; afterwards, he begged his mother to let him live in Oregon. Concerned about the negative influences in nearby Los Angeles, Polamalu's mother sent him to Oregon to live with his uncle, aunt, and cousins when he was nine years old. Polamalu described his uncle, Salu Polamalu, as a disciplinarian who kept him straight.

Polamalu graduated from Douglas High School in Winston, Oregon. While there, he played high school football. Following his junior season, Polamalu was named to the All-State first team and was the All-Far West League Offensive Most Valuable Player for Douglas High, which achieved a 9–1 record. He rushed for 1,040 yards with 22 touchdowns and had 310 receiving yards. On defense, he made 65 tackles and had eight interceptions. Despite playing in only four games during his senior season due to injury, he was named to the 1998 Super Prep All-Northwest team, Tacoma News Tribune Western 100, and the All-Far West League second team. As a two-way player, Polamalu rushed for 671 yards with nine touchdowns and had three interceptions.

Polamalu also played high school baseball and basketball, where he received all-state and all-league honors.

== College career ==
Polamalu received an athletic scholarship to attend the University of Southern California (USC), and played for the Trojans from 1999 to 2002. "I believe God named me Troy for a reason", he said (Troy was the ancient capital of the Trojans). "I was born to come here."

=== Freshman season ===
Polamalu began his college career in 1999 as a true freshman, playing backup at safety and linebacker, while also contributing on special teams. While playing in eight games, he recorded 12 tackles, two sacks, and two forced fumbles. Against Louisiana Tech, he showed his effectiveness on special teams, blocking a punt. His freshman season was cut short when he suffered a concussion at practice. The injury sidelined him for four games.

=== Sophomore season ===
The 2000 season marked the beginning of Polamalu's career. He opened his season starting against Penn State, and recorded only two tackles but made an interception for a 43-yard touchdown. While playing against Colorado, he made five tackles and recovered a fumble that set up a Trojan touchdown. The next game, he again recorded five tackles and also sacked Oregon State's quarterback. During a game against Oregon, he ended the game with 13 tackles, two tackles for a loss, and one interception. Later on, against Stanford, he made 11 tackles in the game. He set a career-high with 14 tackles against Arizona State and tied that mark against Notre Dame. This marked his first year starting all 12 games at strong safety and he closed out 2000 with 83 tackles, five tackles-for-loss, one sack, two interceptions, and one touchdown.

=== Junior season ===
In 2001, he had the best year of his college career. He started the season by being voted as the team captain, and in the season opener he recorded seven tackles and one tackle for a loss against San Jose State. Against Kansas State, he had a game-high 13 tackles, three tackles for a loss, and one forced fumble. Polamalu continued his dominance against Stanford, making a game-high 10 stops, one tackle for a loss, and his first blocked punt of the season. In the next game against Washington he had a game-high 13 tackles, two tackles for a loss, an interception that he returned for a 22-yard touchdown. Throughout the next four games, Polamalu continued to have the most tackles in each game. He had a streak of six games in a row and eight total in the season where he led both teams in tackles. Against Oregon State, he accumulated a game-high 11 tackles, two tackles for a loss, two pass deflections, one forced fumble, and a blocked punt that USC recovered. His streak ended against California, when he had four tackles, but made a game-deciding play with an interception that he returned for a 58-yard touchdown. The next week, the Trojans played their rival, UCLA. Polamalu had two tackles but made key plays when he blocked a punt and made an interception that set up key field goals for USC. He won his first PAC-10 Defensive Player of the Week. USC went on to the Las Vegas Bowl against Utah and Polamalu made a career-high 20 tackles, and three tackles for a loss. He finished his junior campaign with a team-high 118 tackles, 13 tackles for a loss, one sack, three interceptions, two forced fumbles, one fumble recovery, three blocked punts, and two touchdowns. Polamalu won USC's MVP award and was voted a first-team All-American by Football Writers and College and Pro Football News Weekly. The Associated Press voted him second-team All-American.

=== Senior season ===
For his last season, Polamalu continued to uphold his big play reputation. After being voted team captain for the second consecutive year, he opened the 2002 season with seven tackles and one tackle for a loss in a victory over Auburn. The Trojans faced #18 Colorado in the second game and Polamalu had a team-high 11 tackles. His performance in the 40–3 blowout over Colorado won him Pac-10 Defensive Player of the Week. In the fifth game of the season, he injured his ankle on the first defensive series against #17 Washington State. After sitting out a game, he returned against #22 Washington and recorded five tackles and returned an interception 33 yards. Polamalu then disrupted Stanford for the third year in a row, accumulating a season-high 13 tackles, two tackles for a loss, and one sack. He played his last college game in the Orange Bowl against #3 Iowa. A hamstring injury sidelined him for the majority of the game. Polamalu finished his senior season with 68 tackles, nine tackles for a loss, three sacks, one interception, and three forced fumbles. He was voted a first team All-American by the Associated Press, Football Writers, ESPN.com, and Walter Camp, making him the first Trojan to be a two-time first-team All-American since Tony Boselli in 1992.

Polamalu finished his college career with 278 tackles, 29 tackles for a loss, six interceptions, four blocked punts, and three touchdowns.

== Professional career ==
=== 2003 ===
In the last game of his college career in the Orange Bowl, Polamalu injured his knee in pre-game warm-ups and had very limited action in the game that day. The injury also caused Polamalu to miss the Senior Bowl and 2003 NFL Combine. On March 12, 2003, Polamalu participated at USC's pro day, along with Carson Palmer, Justin Fargas, Kareem Kelly, Sultan McCullough, Malaefou MacKenzie, and others. He performed the three-cone drill (6.75), short shuttle (4.37), and 40-yard dash (4.33) for NFL team representatives and scouts.

The Pittsburgh Steelers initially had a verbal agreement with Dexter Jackson, who was the reigning Super Bowl MVP with the 2003 Tampa Bay Buccaneers. With an agreement in place with Jackson, the Steelers focused on drafting a running back in the first round. On March 12, 2003, Jackson signed with the Arizona Cardinals after they added $2 million to their offer and increased his salary by $2.3 million in the first three-years.

Polamalu was projected to be a late-first or early-second-round pick by the majority of NFL draft experts and scouts. He was ranked the top strong safety prospect by BLESTO and National Scouting Combines. The Steelers selected Polamalu in the first round (16th overall) in the 2003 NFL draft.

The San Diego Chargers, who had the 15th overall pick, had a major need at safety to replace Rodney Harrison but passed on the opportunity to select Polamalu by trading down and getting Sammy Davis and Terrence Kiel. The Steelers quickly made a move to bring Polamalu to their team. The Steelers believed so much that Polamalu could have a positive impact on their defense that they traded up from the 27th spot to the 16th spot, originally held by the Chiefs. The Steelers traded away the 92nd and 200th overall picks for the rights to switch first-round picks. The Kansas City Chiefs went on to draft Larry Johnson, Julian Battle, and Brooks Bollinger (the Bollinger pick was subsequently traded to the Jets in the same draft) with the picks acquired from the trade. He has the distinction of being one of only two safeties ever drafted by the Steelers in the first round of an NFL Draft; the other being Terrell Edmunds in 2018.

Pre-draft measurables
Height	Weight	Arm length	Hand span	40-yard dash	Vertical jump	Bench press
5 ft 10 1/8 in (1.78 m)	206 lb (93 kg)	30 3/4 in (0.78 m)	10 1/8 in (0.26 m)	4.33 s	43.5 in (1.10 m)	25 reps
All values from Personal Pro Day

On July 28, 2003, the Steelers signed Polamalu after a short hold out to a five-year, $12.10 million contract.

On July 29, 2003, Polamalu arrived at training camp after missing the start of it due to a hamstring injury and competed with veteran Mike Logan in training camp for the vacant starting strong safety job left by Lee Flowers.

Polamalu made his professional regular season debut in the Steelers' season-opening 34–15 victory over the Baltimore Ravens. The following week, he made his first career tackle and finished with two solo tackles during a 41–20 loss at the Kansas City Chiefs. On November 30, 2003, he made four combined tackles and had his first career sack on Cincinnati Bengals' quarterback Jon Kitna, in a 24–20 loss. On December 23, 2003, Polamalu recorded a season-high six combined tackles in a 13–6 win against the Cleveland Browns. He finished his rookie season in 2003 with a total of 38 combined tackles (30 solo) and four passes defensed in 16 games and zero starts. Throughout the season, he was the backup strong safety and played primarily on special teams and in dime packages. Defensive coordinator Tim Lewis was fired after the 2003 season.

=== 2004 ===
Head coach Bill Cowher named Polamalu the starting strong safety over Mike Logan to start the 2004 season and made his first career start in the Steelers' season-opener against the Oakland Raiders. He made seven combined tackles in their 24–21 victory. The following week, he made a season-high 11 combined tackles, as the Steelers lost 30–13 to the Baltimore Ravens. On September 26, 2004, Polamalu recorded six combined tackles, deflected a pass, and made his first career interception off a pass from A. J. Feeley during a 13–3 victory over the Miami Dolphins. In Week 4, he made six combined tackles, two pass deflections, and intercepted a pass attempt by Carson Palmer and returned it for a 26-yard touchdown during the Steelers' 28–17 victory over the Cincinnati Bengals. In Week 10, against the Cleveland Browns, he earned AFC Defensive Player of the Week. In his first season under new defensive coordinator Dick LeBeau, Polamalu finished with a career-high 96 combined tackles (67 solo), ten pass deflections, five interceptions, and one touchdown in 16 games and 16 starts. He was named to the 2005 Pro Bowl for the first time.

The Steelers finished first atop the AFC North with a 15–1 record. On January 15, 2005, Polamalu started his first career playoff game and collected seven combined tackles, deflected a pass, and intercepted New York Jets' quarterback Chad Pennington, during the Steelers' 20–17 victory in the AFC Divisional Round. The Steelers were eliminated the following week after losing 41–27 in the AFC Championship to the eventual Super Bowl XXXIX Champions, the New England Patriots.

=== 2005 ===
He returned as the starting strong safety in 2005 and started the Steelers' season-opener against the Tennessee Titans. Polamalu recorded three solo tackles, deflected a pass, and intercepted Steve McNair during the 34–7 victory. On September 18, 2005, Polamalu had six solo tackles and sacked Houston Texans' quarterback David Carr three times during a 27–7 victory. He set the NFL record for the most sacks by a safety in a single game. On October 31, 2005, he collected a season-high ten combined tackles in a 20–19 victory over the Baltimore Ravens. The Steelers received a playoff berth after finishing second in the AFC North with an 11–5 record. Polamalu finished the 2005 season with 91 combined tackles (73 solo), six pass deflections, and two interceptions in 16 games and 16 starts. The 2006 Pro Bowl was his second consecutive Pro Bowl appearance. In addition, he was named as a First Team All-Pro.

On January 8, 2006, Polamalu made six combined tackles and intercepted a pass in a 31–17 victory over the Cincinnati Bengals in the AFC wild card game. On February 5, 2006, he started in his first career Super Bowl and collected five combined tackles in the Steelers' 21–10 win against the Seattle Seahawks in Super Bowl XL.

=== 2006 ===
In the Steelers' season-opener against the Miami Dolphins, Polamalu collected a season-high ten combined tackles, defended two passes, and intercepted a pass attempt by Joey Harrington in the Steelers 28–17 victory. On October 15, 2006, he recorded a season-high nine solo tackles, a season-high three pass deflections, and returned an interception for 49-yards during a 45–7 victory over the Kansas City Chiefs. He earned AFC Defensive Player of the Week for his game against the Chiefs. He missed Weeks 13–15 with a shoulder injury. Polamalu finished the 2006 season with 76 combined tackles (57 solo), seven pass deflections, and three interceptions in 13 games and 13 starts. He was voted to his third consecutive Pro Bowl and started the 2007 Pro Bowl at strong safety.

=== 2007 ===
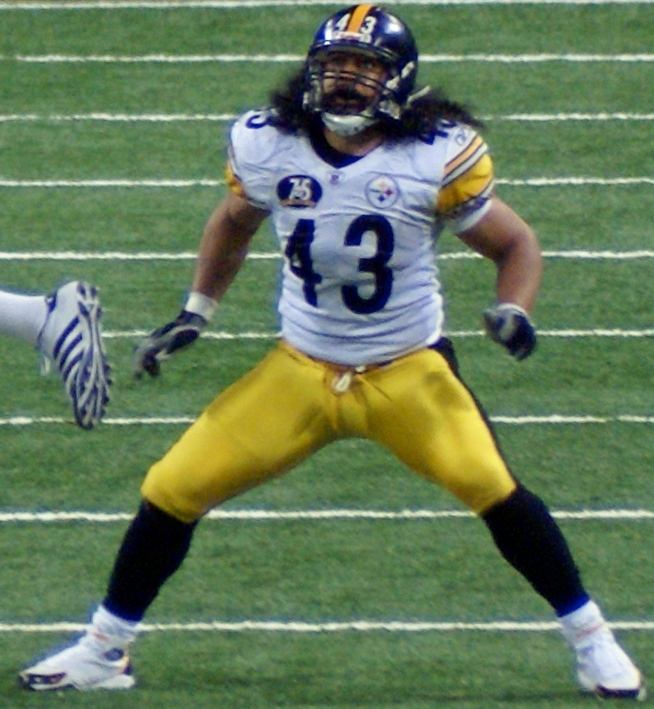
Polamalu during the 2007 season

On July 23, 2007, the Steelers signed Polamalu to a four-year contract extension worth $30.19 million with $15.37 million guaranteed. The contract made him the highest paid safety in the league, but was surpassed by Bob Sanders on December 28, 2007, when he was signed to a five-year, $37.5 million contract with $20 million in guarantees.

In an article on ESPN.com, Polamalu said, "I did not want to be a player who is jumping from team to team." Polamalu had repeatedly expressed his intent on staying with the Steelers.

He remained the starting strong safety under new head coach Mike Tomlin. On September 23, 2007, Polamalu recorded an eight combined tackles and made a pass deflection, as the Steelers defeated the San Francisco 49ers 37–16. He was unable to play in a Week 5 contest against the Seattle Seahawks with an abdominal injury. During a Week 15 matchup against the Jacksonville Jaguars, he had a season-high ten combined tackles and a pass deflection in a 22–29 loss. Polamalu had an injury plagued season and missed Weeks 12–14 with a sprained knee. He finished the 2007 season with 58 combined tackles (45 solo) and nine pass deflections in 12 games and 11 starts.

Polamalu was named a reserve to the 2008 Pro Bowl despite having no interceptions and only playing in 11 games during the 2007 season.

=== 2008 ===
Polamalu making a tackle in 2008

Polamalu suffered a hamstring injury during his off-season workout and missed the entire 2008 training camp. He started the Steelers' season-opener against the Houston Texans and recorded three solo tackles, deflected a pass, and intercepted a pass attempt by Matt Schaub during their 38–17 victory. The following week, he had his second consecutive interception and four solo tackles as the Steelers defeated the Cleveland Browns, 10–6. He earned AFC Defensive Player of the Week for his game against the Browns. During a Week 3 contest against the Philadelphia Eagles, Polamalu made five solo tackles, deflected a pass, and intercepted a pass attempt by Donovan McNabb during a 15–6 loss. This marked his third consecutive game with an interception. On November 16, 2008, he collected three solo tackles, defended a pass, and intercepted a pass by San Diego Chargers' quarterback Philip Rivers, in an 11–10 victory. A fumble he returned for a touchdown at the end of the game was taken off the board as the officials ruled that San Diego had made an illegal forward pass, although head referee Scott Green admitted after the game that the touchdown should have been counted. On December 7, 2008, Polamalu recorded a season-high nine combined tackles, deflected a pass, and had his seventh interception of the season off of a pass attempt by Dallas Cowboys' quarterback Tony Romo during a 20–13 victory. This marked his fourth consecutive game with an interception. He finished the season with 73 combined tackles (54 solo), a career-high 17 pass deflections, and a career-high seven interceptions in 16 games and 16 starts. Polamalu was named to the 2009 Pro Bowl as the AFC's strong safety after being given a unanimous vote by five experts. He earned his second First-team All-Pro honor.

The Steelers finished first atop the AFC North with a 12–4 record. On January 18, 2009, Polamalu made four combined tackles, deflected two passes, and intercepted a pass by Joe Flacco and returned it for a 40-yard touchdown in the fourth quarter of the Steelers' 23–14 victory over the Baltimore Ravens in the AFC Championship. He went on to start in Super Bowl XLIII and assisted in making two tackles in the Steelers' victory over the Arizona Cardinals, 27–23.

=== 2009 ===
On April 24, 2009, it was reported that Polamalu would be featured on the cover of Madden NFL 2010, alongside Super Bowl XLIII opponent and Arizona Cardinals' wide receiver Larry Fitzgerald.

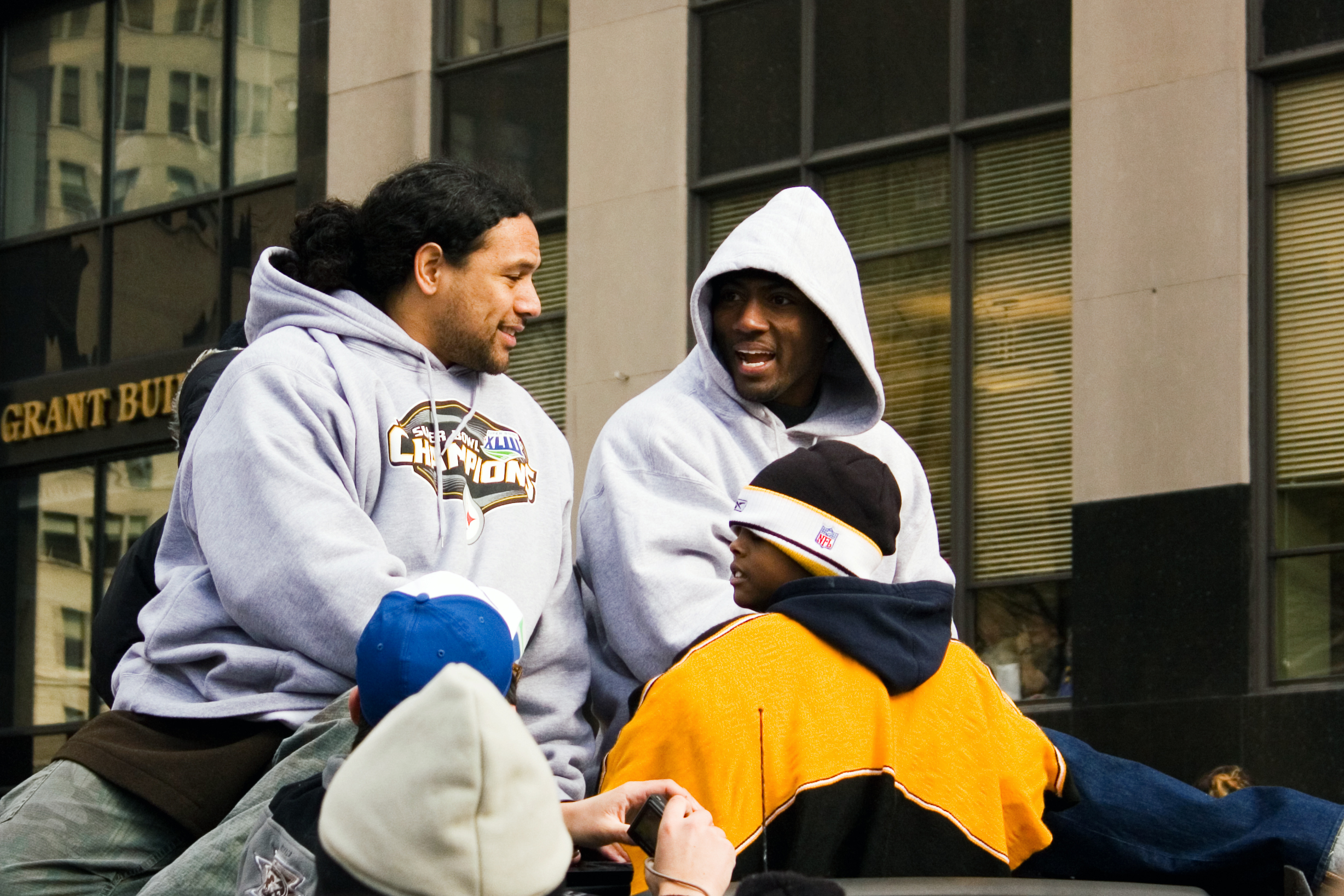
Polamalu (left) and teammate Ryan Clark in the Steelers' Super Bowl XLIII victory parade in February 2009

In the Steelers 2009 season-opener against the Tennessee Titans, Polamalu recorded six tackles and made a one handed interception on a pass attempt by Kerry Collins before getting injured while trying to recover a blocked field goal. He sustained a sprained MCL injury to his left knee and missed the next four games (Weeks 2–5). Polamalu returned in Week 6 and recorded four combined tackles, defended a pass, and made an interception during a 27–14 victory over the Cleveland Browns. On November 15, 2009, he reinjured his left knee in the first quarter of a 18–12 loss to the Cincinnati Bengals. He missed the remainder of the 2009 season and when asked on why he didn't return by John Harris of the Pittsburgh Tribune-Review, Polamalu stated, "If I would have injured it again, the doctor was saying that it will be a career-ending injury, most likely. I had to face that." Polamalu finished the season with 20 combined tackles (18 solo), seven pass deflections, and three interceptions in only five games and five starts.

The Steelers played Tyrone Carter in Polamalu's absence and its defense fell from first in points allowed (223) and passing yards allowed (2,511) in 2008 to 12th in points allowed (324) and 16th in passing yards (3,447). They finished with a 9–7 record and did not qualify for the playoffs for the first time under head coach Mike Tomlin. He was named to the Second Team Pro Football Hall of Fame All-Decade Team for the 2000s.

=== 2010 ===
In a Sports Illustrated survey held in 2010 of 296 active NFL players, Polamalu was ranked the 9th "dirtiest player" in the NFL.

In the Steelers' season-opener against the Atlanta Falcons, Polamalu recorded five combined tackles, defended a pass, and made a game-saving interception off a pass attempt by Matt Ryan with 1:45 left in the game. He sent the game into overtime, where the Steelers won 15–9. During a Week 6 matchup against the Cleveland Browns, he recorded a season-high seven combined tackles, as the Steelers won 28–10. In Week 13, against the Baltimore Ravens, he earned AFC Defensive Player of the Week. In Week 14, Polamalu collected two solo tackles, deflected two passes, and intercepted a pass attempt by Carson Palmer that was intended for Terrell Owens and returned it for a 45-yard touchdown. Polamalu sustained an ankle injury during the play, but stayed in the game, made another interception, and helped the Steelers defeat the Cincinnati Bengals 23–7. He earned AFC Defensive Player of the Week for his game against the Bengals. He was sidelined the next two games by the ankle injury. The Steelers finished first in the AFC North with a 12–4 record and ascended back to first in the NFL for points allowed (232), but remained at 12th in passing yards (3,425). Polamalu finished the 2010 season with 63 combined tackles (42 solo), 11 pass deflections, seven interceptions, one sack, and one touchdown in 14 games and 14 starts. He received a bid to the 2011 Pro Bowl, marking the sixth of his career. He earned First Team All-Pro honors for the third time.

After defeating the Baltimore Ravens and New York Jets, the Steelers went on to Super Bowl XLV to face the Green Bay Packers. He recorded three solo tackles in his third career Super Bowl appearance, but the Steelers were defeated by the Packers 31–25. He was ranked sixth by his peers on the NFL Top 100 Players of 2011.

On January 31, 2011, Polamalu was named the AP Defensive Player of the Year after receiving 17 votes, beating out for the award fellow USC Trojan and Packers' linebacker Clay Matthews, who received 15 votes. He also won the NFL Alumni Player of the Year award over Defensive Back of the Year winner Aqib Talib of the Tampa Bay Buccaneers.

=== 2011 ===
On September 10, 2011, the Steelers signed Polamalu to a four-year, $36.4 million contract extension that included $10.55 million guaranteed.

On October 2, 2011, Polamalu recorded a season-high nine combined tackles during a 17–10 loss to the Houston Texans. During a Week 14 matchup against the Cleveland Browns, he collected eight combined tackles, defended two passes, and made his only interception of the 2011 season in a 14–3 win. He was named AFC Defensive Player of the Week for his performance in Week 17 against the Cleveland Browns. He finished the season with 91 combined tackles (64 solo), 14 pass deflections, and one interception in 16 games and 16 starts. The Steelers received a playoff berth after finishing second in their division with a 12–4 record. On January 8, 2012, the Steelers faced the Denver Broncos in the AFC Wild Card Round and Polamalu made four combined tackles in their 29–23 overtime loss. The Steelers lost on the first play of overtime after Tim Tebow threw an 80-yard touchdown pass to Demaryius Thomas.

He was named as a First Team All-Pro and to the Pro Bowl. He was ranked #19th by his peers on the NFL Top 100 Players of 2012.

=== 2012 ===
Polamalu suffered a strain calf in a practice prior to the Steelers' season-opener against the Denver Broncos. He started the game and made five solo tackles in their 31–19 loss. He further aggravated the injury during the game and left after further straining his calf muscle. On October 7, 2012, Polamalu returned and recorded two solo tackles in a 16–14 victory over the Philadelphia Eagles. He limped off the field in the second quarter and was unable to return. Polamalu missed the next six games (Weeks 6–12), but remained on the active roster. There were conflicting reports about whether it was a calf strain or a calf tear, but multiple media members cited it as a severe strain. On December 23, 2012, Polamalu made a season-high eight combined tackles, defended a pass, and had his only sack of the season on Cincinnati Bengals' quarterback Andy Dalton, as the Steelers lost 13–10. The following week, he recorded three combined tackles, deflected two passes, and made the only interception of the season in a 24–10 win against the Cleveland Browns. Polamalu finished the 2012 season with a total of 34 combined tackles (29 solo), three pass deflections, one sack, and one interception in seven games and seven starts. He was ranked 91st by his fellow players on the NFL Top 100 Players of 2013.

=== 2013 ===
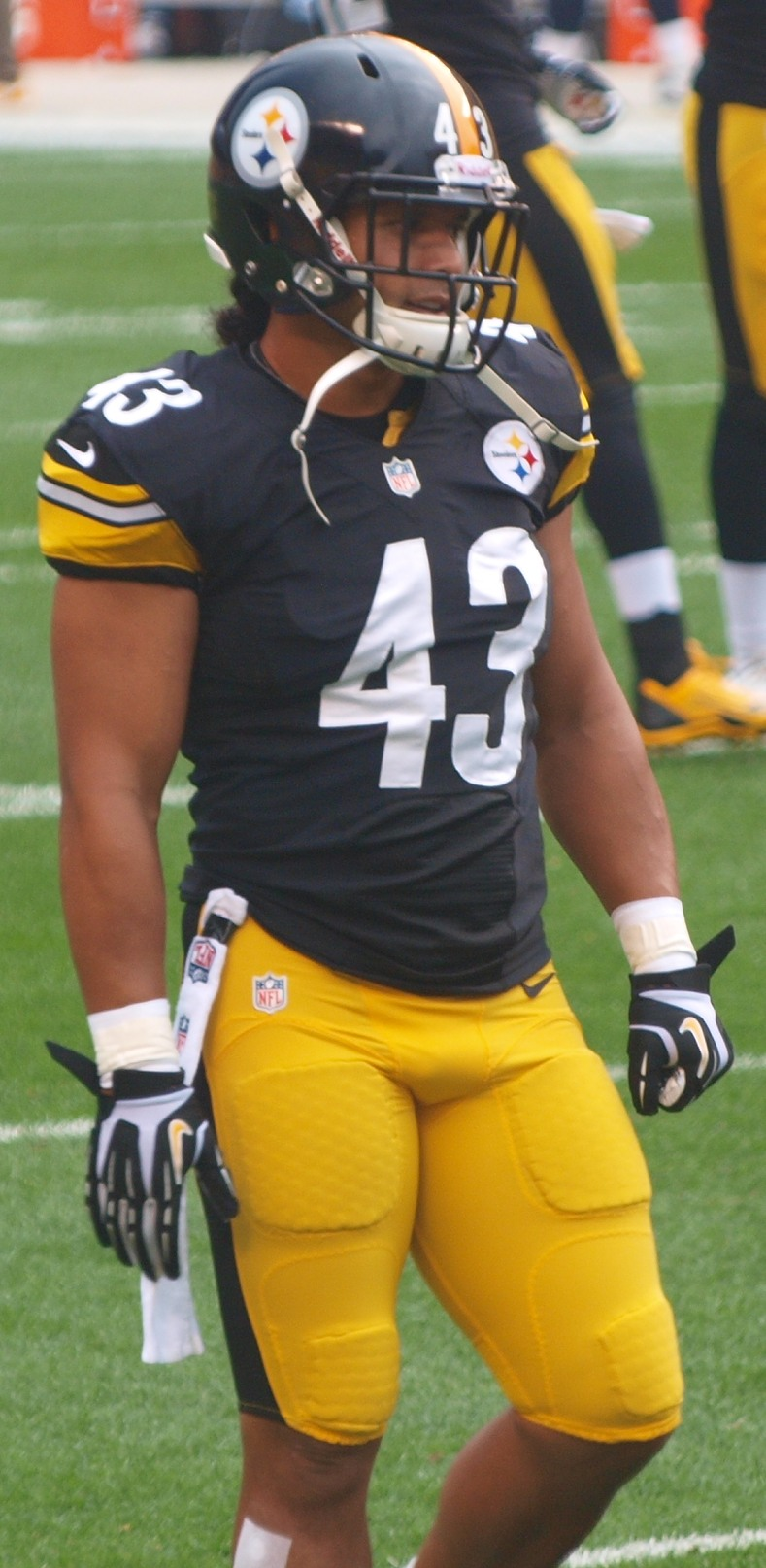
Polamalu in 2013

One of the Steelers' top needs entering the draft was safety as Polamalu was entering the end of his career and had an injury-riddled season in 2012. The Steelers selected Shamarko Thomas in the fourth round of the 2013 NFL draft to possibly be Polamalu's successor.

Polamalu started the Steelers' season-opener against the Tennessee Titans and recorded six combined tackles and a sack in their 16–9 loss. The next week, Polamalu collected a season-high nine combined tackles and defended a pass in a 20–10 loss to the Cincinnati Bengals. In Week 7, he recorded three solo tackles, defended two passes, a sack, and intercepted a pass attempt by Terrelle Pryor in an 21–18 loss to the Oakland Raiders. In Week 12, Polamalu earned AFC Defensive Player of the Week for his performance against the Cleveland Browns. In Week 14, Polamalu made one tackle and returned an interception off of Ryan Tannehill for a 19-yard touchdown during the Steelers' 34–28 loss. He finished the season with 69 combined tackles (50 solo), 11 pass deflections, two interceptions, and a sack in 16 games and 16 starts. He was named to his final Pro Bowl. He was ranked 61st by his fellow players on the NFL Top 100 Players of 2014.

=== 2014 ===
Polamalu (on top of the pile) making a tackle in 2014

On March 5, 2014, the Steelers signed Polamalu to a three-year, $20 million contract extension. They also restructured his contract so he would only account for $6.3 million against the salary cap in 2014 instead of the original $10.7 million cap number.

Polamalu started the Steelers' season-opener against the Cleveland Browns and made a season-high 11 combined tackles in their 30–27 victory. He missed Weeks 10–11 after suffering a knee sprain. The Steelers made the playoffs and faced off against the Baltimore Ravens in the Wild Card Round. In the 30–17 loss, he had eight combined tackles and one quarterback hit in his final career game.

=== Retirement ===
On April 10, 2015, Polamalu announced his retirement from professional football citing his family as the main reason. It was reported that he was fully planning to play in 2015, but the Steelers had forced Polamalu into retirement. In February 2015, Polamalu was approached and told by front office members and owner Dan Rooney that if he did not retire, he would be released. He received an offer from the Tennessee Titans to join his former longtime defensive coordinator Dick LeBeau, but ultimately decided on retiring after weighing his options. He finished his 12-year career with 770 tackles, 32 interceptions, and three touchdowns.

=== Alliance of American Football ===
In April 2018, Polamalu was named the Head of Player Relations of the Alliance of American Football.

=== Pro Football Hall of Fame election ===
On January 2, 2020, Polamalu was named one of 15 modern-era finalists for election into the Pro Football Hall of Fame in Canton, Ohio. He and former Indianapolis Colts receiver Reggie Wayne were the only two finalists for 2020 to be nominated in their first year of eligibility. On February 1, 2020, Troy Polamalu was officially elected to the Pro Football Hall of Fame.

== NFL career statistics ==
Legend
	NFL Defensive Player of the Year
	Won the Super Bowl
**Bold**	Career high

=== Regular season ===
Year	Team	Games		Tackles				Interceptions				
Year	Team	GP	GS	Cmb	Solo	Ast	Sck	PD	Int	Yds	Lng	TD
2003	PIT	16	0	38	30	8	2.0	4	0	0	0	0
2004	PIT	16	16	**96**	67	**29**	1.0	15	5	58	26	**1**
2005	PIT	16	16	91	**73**	18	**3.0**	8	2	42	36	0
2006	PIT	13	13	77	58	19	1.0	10	3	51	**49**	0
2007	PIT	11	11	58	45	13	0.0	9	0	0	0	0
2008	PIT	16	16	73	54	19	0.0	**17**	**7**	59	23	0
2009	PIT	5	5	20	18	2	0.0	7	3	17	23	0
2010	PIT	14	14	63	49	14	1.0	11	**7**	**101**	45	**1**
2011	PIT	16	16	91	64	27	1.0	14	2	33	33	0
2012	PIT	7	7	34	29	5	1.0	3	1	1	1	0
2013	PIT	16	16	69	50	19	2.0	11	2	36	19	**1**
2014	PIT	12	12	61	40	21	0.0	1	0	0	0	0
Total		158	142	770	576	194	12.0	100	32	398	49	3

=== Postseason ===
Year	Team	Games		Tackles					Interceptions				
Year	Team	GP	GS	Cmb	Solo	Ast	Sck	TFL	PD	Int	Yds	Avg	TD
2004	PIT	2	2	7	4	3	0.0	1	1	**1**	14	14.0	0
2005	PIT	4	4	**24**	**15**	**9**	**0.5**	**2**	**3**	0	0	0.0	0
2007	PIT	1	1	2	0	2	0.0	0	0	0	0	0.0	0
2008	PIT	3	3	9	5	4	0.0	1	**3**	**1**	**40**	**40.0**	**1**
2010	PIT	3	3	10	9	1	0.0	1	0	0	0	0.0	0
2011	PIT	1	1	4	2	2	0.0	0	0	0	0	0.0	0
2014	PIT	1	1	8	5	3	0.0	1	0	0	0	0.0	0
Total		15	15	64	40	24	0.5	6	7	2	54	27.0	1

== Personal life ==
Polamalu's surname at birth was Aumua. He petitioned in 2007 to change his legal surname to his mother's maiden name of Polamalu. He had already been using Polamalu for the previous 15 years.

Polamalu's favorite pastimes include surfing, growing flowers, making furniture, and playing the piano.

In 2009, Polamalu said that he tried to separate himself from his profession as much as possible and did not watch football games at home. As of 2009, he resided with his family in Pittsburgh during the football season and in San Diego, California during the off-season.

During the 2011 NFL lockout, Polamalu utilized his time away from the field to return to the University of Southern California to complete his college education. On May 13, 2011, he graduated from USC with a bachelor's degree in history. On his personal website he explained, "I decided to finish what I started and walked that stage today not only because it was very important to me personally, but because I want to emphasize the importance of education, and that nothing should supersede it." Teammate Ben Roethlisberger followed in Polamalu's footsteps the following off-season and finished his degree as well.

=== Family ===
Polamalu's uncle, Kennedy Polamalu, is currently the running backs coach for the Seattle Seahawks and formerly coached running backs for the Las Vegas Raiders. He was the Jacksonville Jaguars running backs coach for five years, and also served as offensive coordinator for UCLA. Another uncle, Aoatoa Polamalu, played nose tackle at Penn State from 1984 to 1988.

Despite Polamalu's hard-hitting style on the gridiron, he became known off the field as a soft-spoken family man. Polamalu is married to Theodora Holmes and has two sons: Paisios, born in 2008, and Ephraim, born in 2010. Theodora is the sister of NFL player and USC Trojans alumnus Alex Holmes and Khaled Holmes. Polamalu and Theodora founded the Harry Panos Fund to honor Theodora's grandfather, who served in World War II.

=== Faith ===
Polamalu is well-read in the history and theology of early Christianity, which ultimately led both him and his wife to convert to Orthodox Christianity in 2007. He made the Sign of the Cross after every play. Among his spiritual activities was a 2007 pilgrimage to Orthodox Christian sites in Greece and Turkey. He seldom gives interviews, but when he does, he often speaks of the role his spirituality plays in his life. During his NFL career, he prayed after each play and prayed on the sidelines. His sons are both named after Orthodox Christian saints: Saint Paisios of Mt. Athos and Saint Ephraim the Syrian.

=== Hair ===
Polamalu's hair is one of his most distinguishing characteristics. In the CBS Playoffs Pre-game Show in 2006, Polamalu said the last time he had gotten a haircut was in 2000 at USC.

In an October 15, 2006, game against the Kansas City Chiefs, Chiefs' running back Larry Johnson pulled Polamalu down by the hair in order to tackle him. Afterward, Polamalu took out an insurance policy on his hair.

Polamalu had a contract with Head & Shoulders shampoo and has starred in five commercials for the product. On April 1, 2013, it was reported that he had decided not to sign a new contract to endorse Head & Shoulders and instead signed a five-year contract with Suave to endorse their "Action Series".

=== Business ===
Polamalu is an investor in Arenda Capital, which is called a multi-family office that pulls together the funds of four families and manages their spending and investments. Any large purchases or investments must be approved by all members of the office. Arenda Capital makes investments into real estate properties and shares the earnings among all of the partners within the office. Polamalu joined Arenda Capital in 2010.

== In the media ==
In 2005, Pittsburgh-area band Mr. Devious wrote and recorded the novelty song "Puhlahmahlu", a parody of the song "Mah Nà Mah Nà". Guitarist Glenn Shirey said that the song was inspired by Fox Sports announcer Dick Stockton's mispronunciation of Polamalu's name.

Polamalu is featured on the cover of the Scholastic children's book National Football League Megastars which profiles Polamalu and 14 other NFL stars.

During Super Bowl XLIII, a commercial of Polamalu aired that had him do a remake of the famous "Mean Joe" Greene Coca-Cola commercial, except it was advertising for Coca-Cola Zero instead. Two Coke "brand managers" take the Coke Zero bottle away right when the kid is to give it to Polamalu, with Polamalu subsequently tackling one of the managers. Then, instead of giving the kid his own jersey, he rips the shirt off the brand manager he has tackled and tosses it to the kid. Greene, who like Polamalu lives a very quiet life off the field in contrast to his on-field play, liked the commercial.

He was on the cover of Madden NFL 10 with Larry Fitzgerald and is supposedly a sufferer of the "Madden Curse".

Polamalu voiced Villager #1 in the 2016 film Moana.

Since 2019, he and Patrick Mahomes have appeared in commercials for Head & Shoulders.
