= Sherman Independent School District =

School district in Texas

Address
- 2701 North Loy Lake Road Sherman, TX, USA ESC Region 10
- Coordinates: 33°40′3″N 96°36′22″W

District information
- Type: Independent School District
- Motto: Building Bearcats!
- Grades: PK-12
- Established: 1849
- Superintendent: Dr. Thomas O'Neal
- Governing agency: Texas Education Agency
- Schools: 14
- NCES District ID: 4840080

Students and staff
- Students: 7,487 (2025-26)
- Athletic conference: UIL Class AAAAA
- District mascot: Bearcats
- Colors: Maroon, White, & Gray

Other information
- Website: www.shermanisd.net

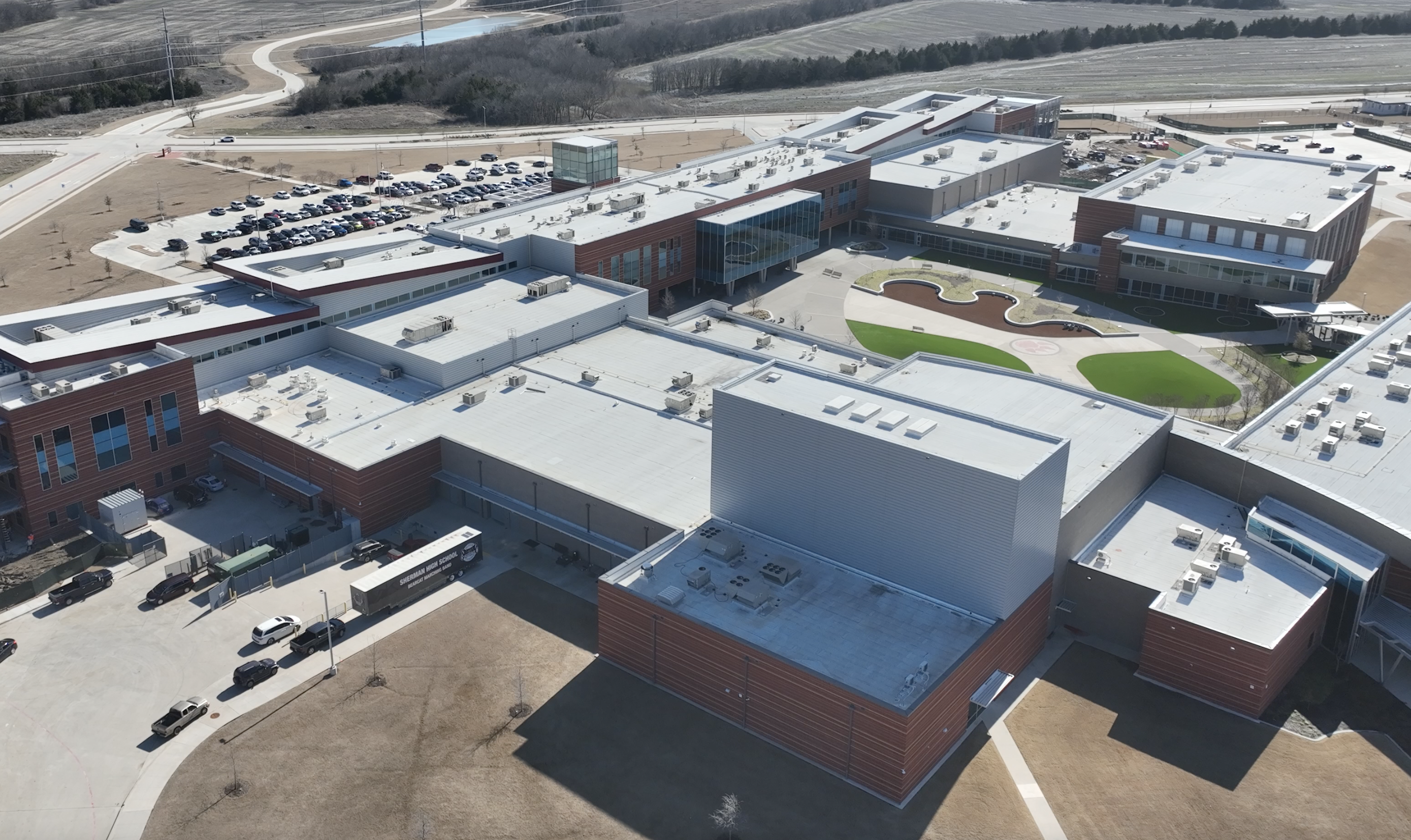
Sherman High School

Sherman Independent School District (Sherman ISD, SISD) is a public school district based in Sherman, Texas, United States. Covering 77 square miles in central Grayson County, the district serves the majority of Sherman, Knollwood, and a small portion of Denison.

As of 2026, Sherman ISD operates fourteen campuses, including one high school, two middle schools, nine primary schools, an alternative high school, and a District Alternative Education Program (DAEP). The district most recently received a C rating from the Texas Education Agency (TEA).

== History ==
Previously the superintendent of schools had direct supervision of fine arts programs, but the board of trustees ended this in 2023.

== Schools ==
Secondary Schools

| School name | Grades | Additional information |
|---|---|---|
| Sherman High School | 9-12 | Current campus opened in 2021 |
| Piner Middle School | 6-8 | One of the former Sherman High School campuses |
| Sherman Middle School | 6-8 | One of the former Sherman High School campuses |
| Jefferson Learning Center | Alternative School | non-disciplinary school of choice offering self-paced, accelerated programs |

Elementary Schools

| School name | Grades | Additional information |
|---|---|---|
| Crutchfield Elementary School | PK-5 | |
| Dillingham Elementary School | PK-5 | Former Junior High and Intermediate Campus |
| Fairview Elementary School | PK-5 | |
| Neblett Elementary School | PK-5 | |
| Parker Elementary School | PK-5 | |
| Sory Elementary School | PK-5 | |
| New Childhood Early Education Center (opening date TBA) | Headstart | Wakefield Elementary closed at the end of the 2024-2025 school year and a new early childhood education center is currently being built on the same site |
| Washington Elementary School | PK-5 | |
| Fred Douglas Early Childhood Center | Head Start | |
