= Denison, Texas =

- City
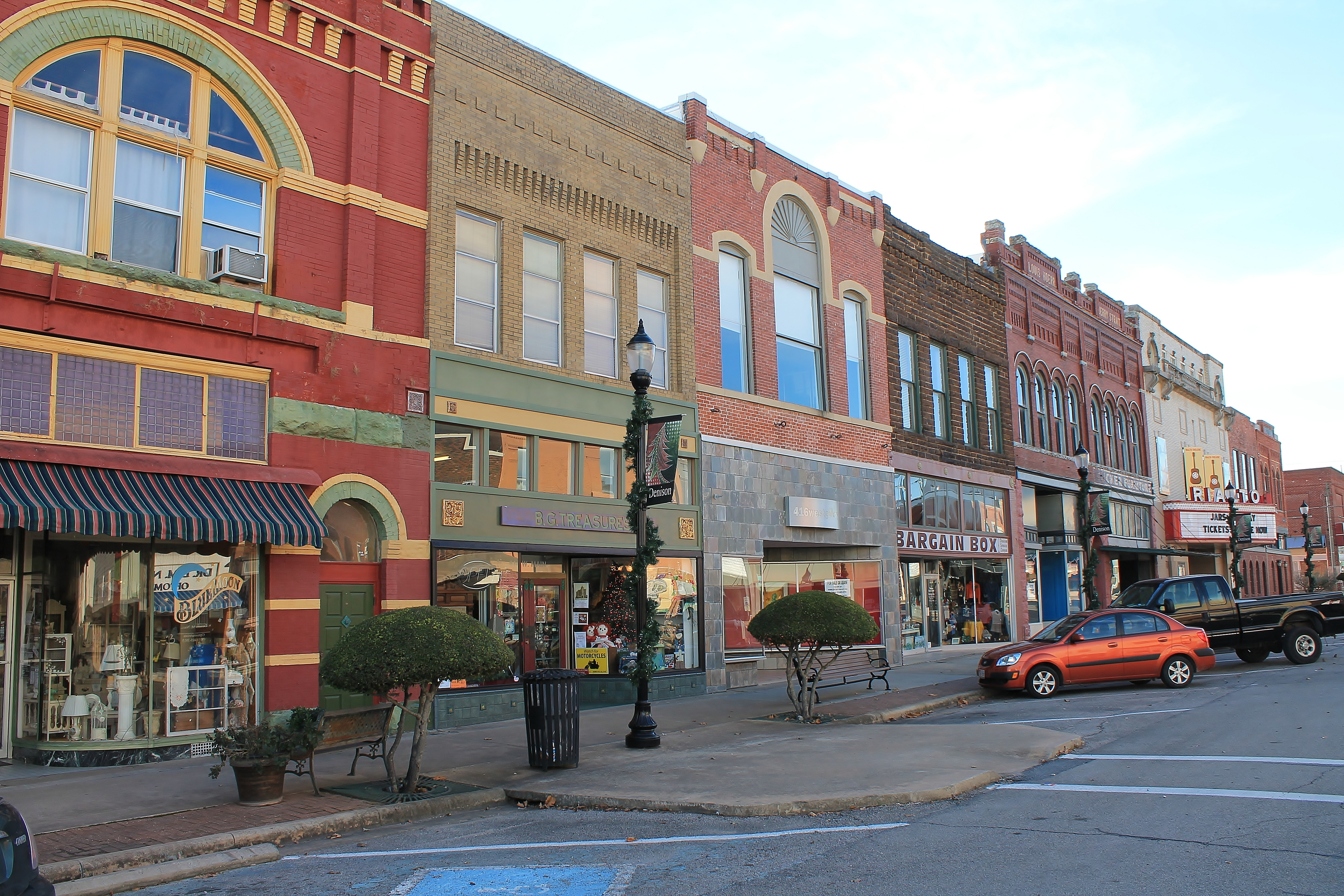
- Denison Commercial Historic District

- Flag

- Location of Denison, Texas

- Location in Texas Location in the United States
- Coordinates: 33°44′59″N 96°33′27″W
- Country: United States
- State: Texas
- County: Grayson
- Founded: 1872

Government
  - Type: Council-manager

Area
  - Total: 29.06 sq mi (75.27 km^{2})
  - Land: 28.61 sq mi (74.09 km^{2})
  - Water: 0.46 sq mi (1.18 km^{2}) 1.94%
- Elevation: 728 ft (222 m)

Population (2020)
  - Total: 24,479
  - Density: 855.7/sq mi (330.4/km^{2})
  - Demonyms: Denisonite Denisonian
- Time zone: UTC−6 (Central (CST))
  - Summer (DST): UTC−5 (CDT)
- ZIP Codes: 75020–75021
- Area codes: 903, 430
- FIPS code: 48-19900
- GNIS feature ID: 2410322
- Website: www.denisontx.gov

Denison is a city in Grayson County, Texas, United States, 1 mile (1.6 km) south of the Texas–Oklahoma border. Its population was 24,479 at the 2020 census, up from 22,682 at the 2010 census. Denison is part of the Texoma region and is one of two principal cities in the Sherman–Denison metropolitan statistical area and is also part of the Dallas-Fort Worth combined statistical area. It is the birthplace of 34th U.S. president Dwight D. Eisenhower.

== History ==
Denison was founded in 1872 in conjunction with the Missouri–Kansas–Texas Railroad (MKT) or "Katy" depot. It was named after wealthy Katy vice president George Denison. Because the town was established close to where the MKT crossed the Red River (both important conduits of transportation in the industrial era), it came to be an important commercial center in the 19th-century American West. In 1875, Doc Holliday had offices in Denison.

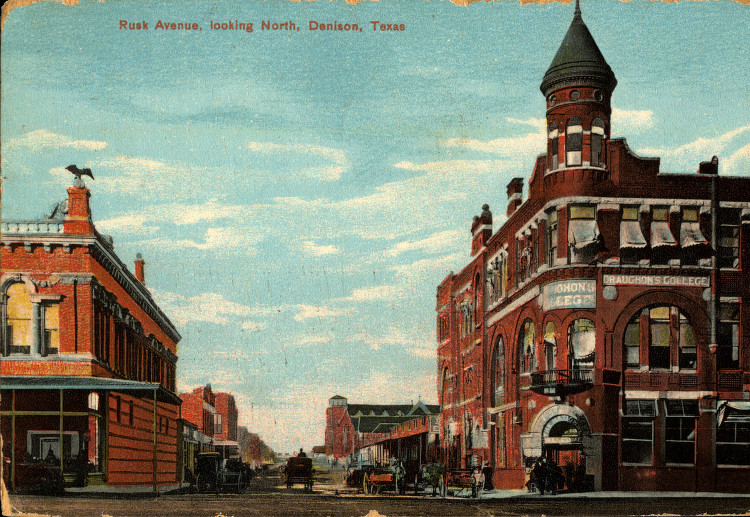
Rusk Avenue looking north (postcard, circa 1911)

During the phylloxera epidemic of the mid-19th century, which destroyed the vast majority of wine grapes in Europe, Denison horticulturalist T.V. Munson pioneered methods in creating phylloxera-resistant vines, and earned induction into the French Legion of Honor, as well as sister city status for Denison and Cognac, France.

In 1901, the first electric "Interurban" railway in Texas, the Denison and Sherman Railway, was completed between Denison and Sherman.

In 1915, Kentucky-based evangelist Mordecai Ham held a revival meeting in Denison, which resulted in 1,100 professions of faith in Jesus Christ.

Denison played host to 20th-century notables such as the Marx Brothers and President Dwight D. Eisenhower, who was born on October 14, 1890, in Denison.

== Geography ==
Denison is located in northeastern Grayson County, with the city limits extending north to the Red River, which forms the Oklahoma state line. It is bordered to the south by the city of Sherman; the city centers are 11 miles (18 km) apart.

According to the United States Census Bureau, Denison has a total area of 23.4 square miles (60.7 km^{2}), of which 0.46 sq mi (1.2 km^{2}), or 1.94%, is covered by water.

Denison Dam, which forms Lake Texoma on the Red River, is 5 miles (8 km) north of Denison. The lake is in the center of the Texoma region, encompassing parts of Texas and Oklahoma.

=== Climate ===
Denison has a humid subtropical climate (Cfa in the Köppen climate classification).

== Demographics ==
Historical population
Census	Pop.	Note	%±
1880	3,975		—
1890	10,958		175.7%
1900	11,807		7.7%
1910	13,632		15.5%
1920	17,065		25.2%
1930	13,850		−18.8%
1940	15,581		12.5%
1950	17,504		12.3%
1960	22,748		30.0%
1970	24,923		9.6%
1980	23,884		−4.2%
1990	21,505		−10.0%
2000	22,773		5.9%
2010	22,682		−0.4%
2020	24,479		7.9%
U.S. Decennial Census

=== 2020 census ===
As of the 2020 census, Denison had a population of 24,479. The median age was 40.3 years, 23.0% of residents were under the age of 18, and 19.9% of residents were 65 years of age or older. For every 100 females there were 90.5 males, and for every 100 females age 18 and over there were 86.7 males age 18 and over.

As of the 2020 census, there were 9,712 households and 6,038 families, of which 30.0% had children under the age of 18 living in them. Of all households, 41.2% were married-couple households, 18.2% were households with a male householder and no spouse or partner present, and 33.0% were households with a female householder and no spouse or partner present. About 29.0% of all households were made up of individuals and 14.2% had someone living alone who was 65 years of age or older.

As of the 2020 census, there were 10,981 housing units, of which 11.6% were vacant. The homeowner vacancy rate was 3.0% and the rental vacancy rate was 10.8%.

As of the 2020 census, 95.2% of residents lived in urban areas, while 4.8% lived in rural areas.

Racial composition as of the 2020 census
Race	Number	Percent
White	17,429	71.2%
Black or African American	2,049	8.4%
American Indian and Alaska Native	575	2.3%
Asian	195	0.8%
Native Hawaiian and Other Pacific Islander	19	0.1%
Some other race	1,338	5.5%
Two or more races	2,874	11.7%
Hispanic or Latino (of any race)	3,225	13.2%

== Economy ==
=== Major employers ===
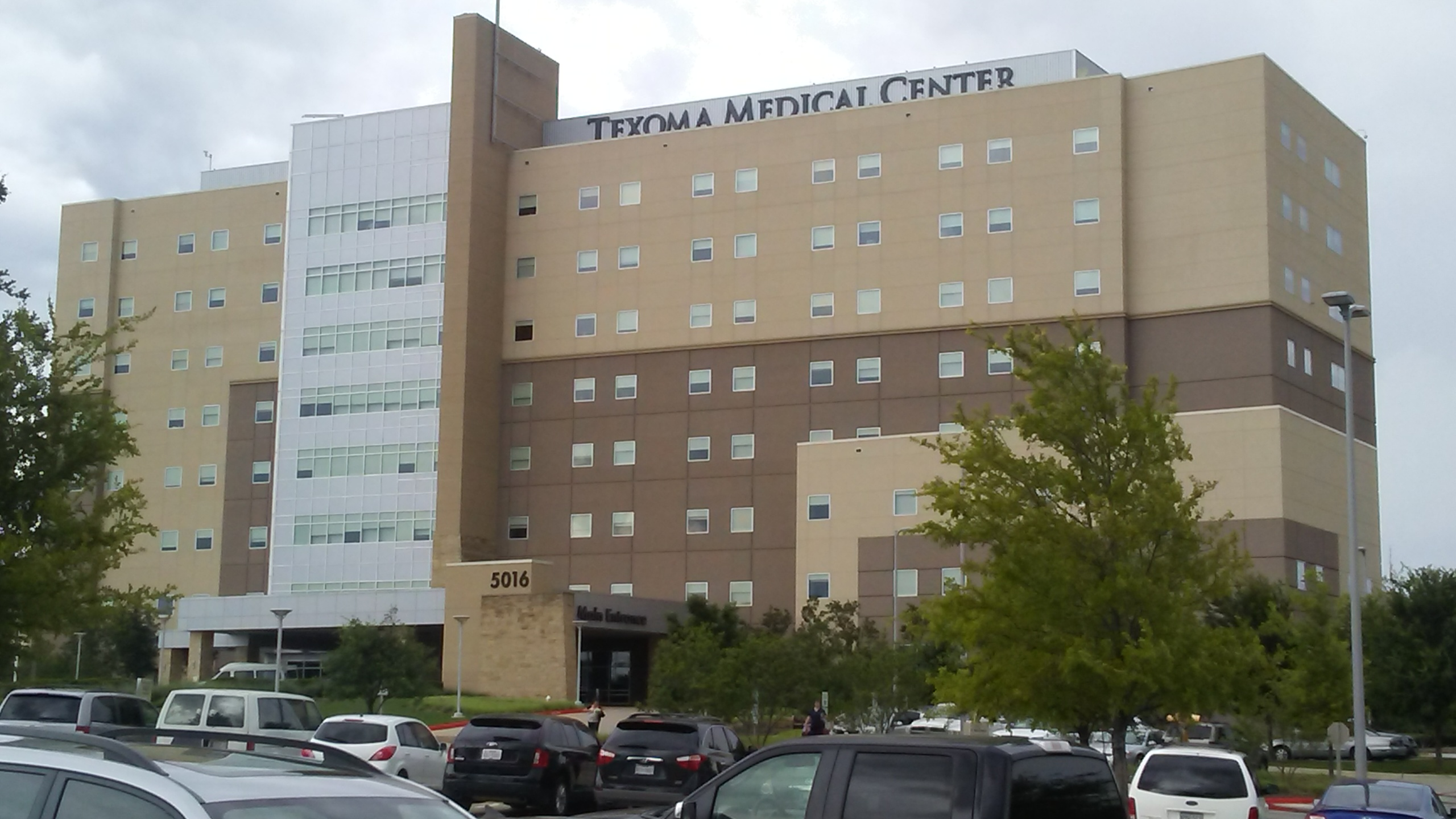
Texoma Medical Center in Denison

Major employers in Denison include:

- Denison Independent School District
- Ruiz Foods
- Texoma Medical Center
- Cigna
- Caterpillar
- Wal-Mart Stores
- Spectrum Brands
- Anthem
- ACS Manufacturing
- Denison Industries
- City of Denison
- Grayson College
- Dialogue Direct Contact Centers
- National Government Services
- Champion Cooler Corporation
- SignWarehouse.com

== Arts and culture ==
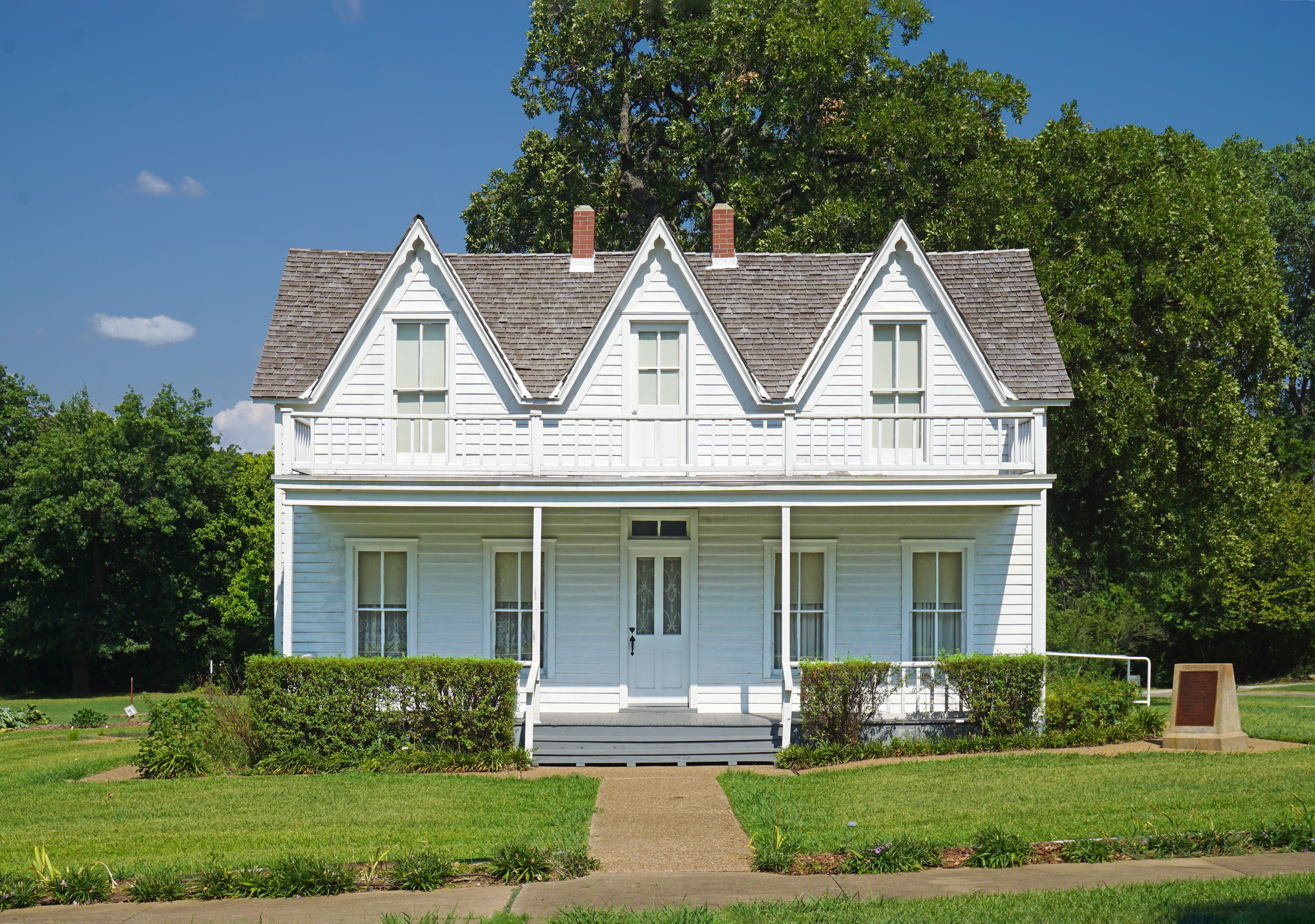
Birthplace of US President Dwight Eisenhower

The Grayson County Frontier Village in Denison contains 11 of the oldest homes in Grayson County that were moved here for preservation.

== Sports ==
Former minor league baseball teams include the Denison Katydids, Denison Blue Sox, Denison Champions, Denison Railroaders, and Sherman–Denison Twins.

Munson Stadium seats 5,262 people and is used primarily for football. It is the home field of Denison High School's football and soccer teams. The Denison High School football team won the 1984 Texas Class 4A State Championship by beating Tomball 27–13, completing a perfect 16–0 record. They also made appearances in the 1995, 1996, and 1997 Class 4A Division II State Championship games, losing each time to La Marque. They are home to the longest high school football rivalry in Texas: the Battle of the Ax, against Sherman High School.

== Education ==
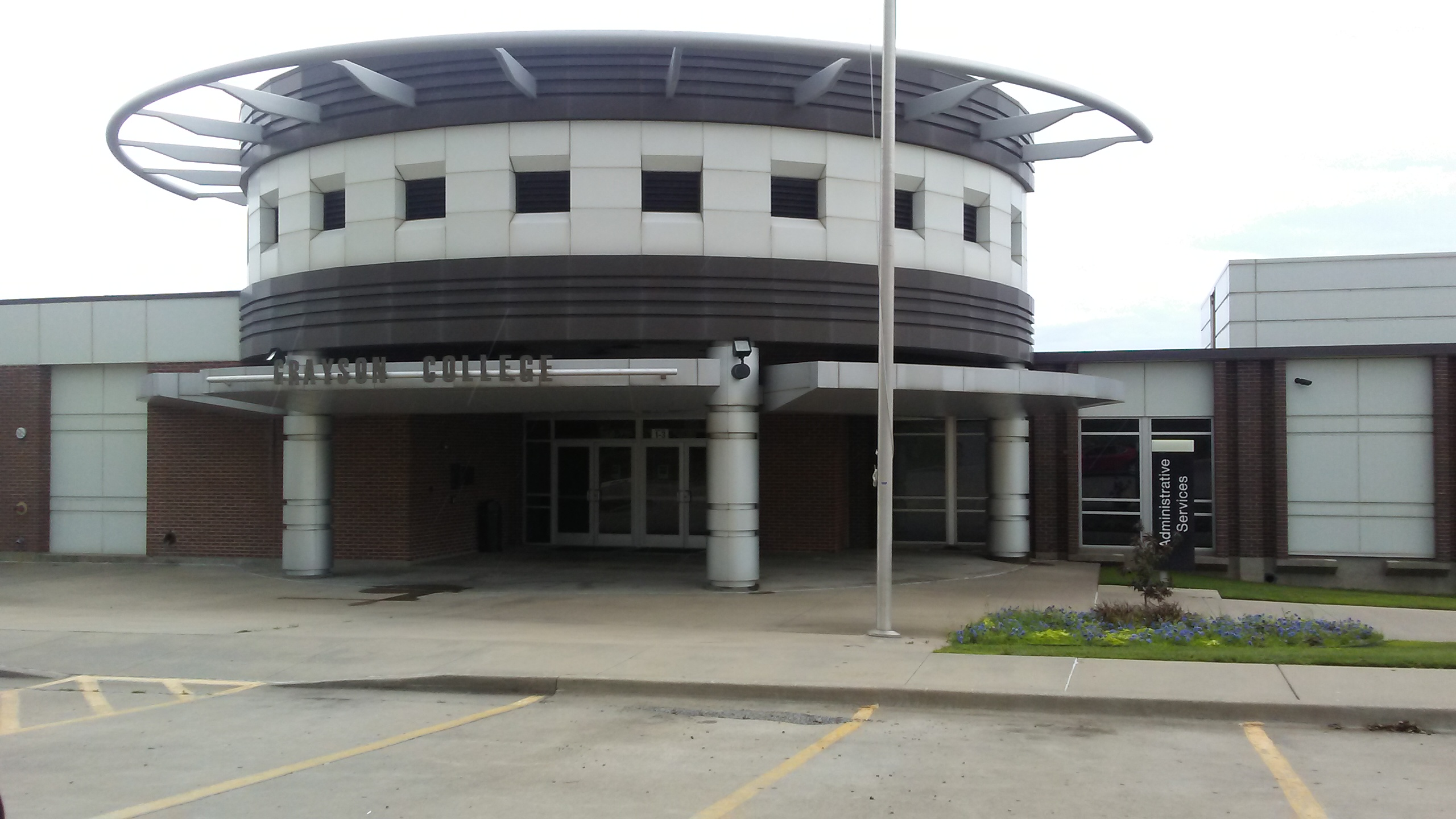
Administration building at Grayson College in Denison

Denison is served by the Denison Independent School District. The current Denison High School campus opened in 2014.

Grayson College is located in Denison. The school's T.V. Munson Viticulture and Enology Program preserves Denison's viticultural heritage.

== Media ==
=== Magazine ===
- Texoma Living!

=== Newspaper ===
- The Herald Democrat

=== Radio stations ===
- KCBN 102.5
- KMKT Katy Country 93.1
- KDOC HOT 107.3 FM

=== Television stations ===
- KTEN – Channel 10 (NBC)
- KTEN – DT Channel 10.2 (The Texoma CW)
- KTEN – Channel 10.3 (ABC Texoma)
- KXII – Channel 12 (CBS)
- KXII – DT Channel 12.2 (My Texoma)
- KXII – DT Channel 12.3 (Fox Texoma)

== Infrastructure ==
=== Transportation ===
Denison is served by two U.S. highways—U.S. 69 and U.S. 75 (Katy Memorial Expressway) and two state highways—State Highway 91 and Spur 503 (Eisenhower Parkway). State Highway 91, known as Texoma Parkway, is one of the main commercial strips that connects Sherman and Denison. It also extends north to Lake Texoma.

General aviation service is provided by North Texas Regional Airport.

TAPS, a regional public transportation system, offers limited service for disabled passengers.

==== Highways ====
- U.S. Highway 75 north-south: Minnesota to Dallas, Texas
- U.S. Highway 69 north-south: Minnesota to Port Arthur, Texas
- SH 91 north-south: Achille, Oklahoma to Sherman
- Spur 503 east-west: Highway 69 to Highway 75 completing the southern portion of the loop around Denison.
- FM 120 east-west: Carpenter's Bluff to Pottsboro
- FM 1417 north-south: Denison to Sherman
- FM 691 east-west: Denison to North Texas Regional Airport
- FM 131 north-south: Denison to Sherman
- FM 84 east-west: Denison to Lake Texoma
- FM 1753 east-west: Ambrose to Denison

=== Health care ===
Denison is served by Texoma Medical Center.

== Notable people ==
- Bill Anoatubby, governor of the Chickasaw Nation
- Clora Bryant, jazz trumpeter
- Joie Chitwood (1912–1988), race car driver and businessman
- Dwight D. Eisenhower, President of the United States; was born in Denison in 1890, and to date is the city's most notable resident.
- Booker Ervin, jazz musician who played tenor saxophone
- Michael Haynes, NFL Hall of Fame player
- Jim Hightower, former commissioner of Texas Department of Agriculture and a liberal commentator and author, born in Denison in 1943
- John Hillerman, the actor who played Higgins on Tom Selleck's Magnum, P.I.
- John Henry "Doc" Holliday, gunfighter, gambler, and western legend, maintained a dental practice in Denison
- Aaron Hunt and Reggie Hunt, brothers and professional football players in Canadian Football League
- Viola Van Katwijk, composer and pianist
- Thomas Volney Munson, horticulturalist
- Clifford Noe, international confidence man and swindler
- Beatrice Pearson, actress
- Jadarian Price, former running back for the University of Notre Dame, first round draft pick of the Seattle Seahawks
- SoMo, singer
- Chesley Burnett "Sully" Sullenberger, airline pilot
- Jordan Taylor, NFL wide receiver, Super Bowl 50 champion with the Denver Broncos
- Zeb Terry, Major League Baseball infielder
- Fred Washington, NFL defensive tackle for Chicago Bears
- Harold Wertz, 1927–1999, "Bouncy" of Our Gang comedies (1932–1933)

== Sister city ==
- Cognac, France

== In popular culture ==
In 2013, Lake Texoma and the Hampton Inn and Suites Denison were featured on a travel show titled The Official Best of Texas, which aired on CBS and the Discovery Channel.

Denison is referenced in the book Dan Gutman's From Texas with Love (Genius Files #4) as the main characters drove through the town, noting the bust of President Dwight D. Eisenhower on the side of U.S. Route 75.
