= Bill Wold =

American basketball player

Hapoel Tel Aviv
- League: Israeli Basketball Premier League

Career information
- High school: Fairfax High School
- College: Los Angeles Valley College; Oregon State
- Playing career: 1966–1968

Career history
- 1966–1968: Hapoel Tel Aviv

Bill Wold is an American former basketball player. He played basketball in college for Los Angeles Valley College and the Oregon State Beavers basketball team. He then played professional basketball for the Hapoel Tel Aviv basketball team in the Israeli Basketball Premier League in Israel.

== Biography ==
In 1956, playing high school baseball for Fairfax High School, Wold batted .566 and was named to the Los Angeles All City Baseball Team.

In both 1957 and 1958, at Los Angeles Valley College, Wold was All-League and All-Southern California in basketball for the Monarchs, and playing left field for the Monarchs baseball team was named to the 1958 All-League baseball second team. He then transferred colleges, and played guard for the Oregon State Beavers basketball team from 1959–61. He was named to the 1959 Far West Classics All-Star Team and was All Coast Honorable Mention.

From 1966 to 1968, Wold played professional basketball for the Hapoel Tel Aviv basketball team in the Israeli Basketball Premier League in Israel. He was named to the 1967 Israel National five.

Wold then returned to the United States, and for the next 30 years taught high school and coached high school basketball, including at Douglas High School. His son Rich Wold later also played basketball for Oregon State.

He was inducted into the Southern California Jewish Sports Hall of Fame in 2003. Wold was also inducted into the Los Angeles Unified School District Hall of Fame.
