= Denison Independent School District =

School district in Texas, United States

Address
- 400 South Lillis Lane Denison, TX, USA ESC Region 10
- Coordinates: 33°45′16″N 96°34′56″W

District information
- Type: Independent School District
- Motto: It's great to be a Yellow Jacket!
- Grades: PK–12
- Established: 1907; 119 years ago
- Superintendent: Dr. David Kirkbride
- Governing agency: Texas Education Agency
- Schools: 10
- NCES District ID: 4816710

Students and staff
- Students: 4,977 (2025–2026)
- Athletic conference: UIL Class AAAAA
- District mascot: Yellow Jackets
- Colors: Black; Gold

Other information
- Website: www.denisonisd.net

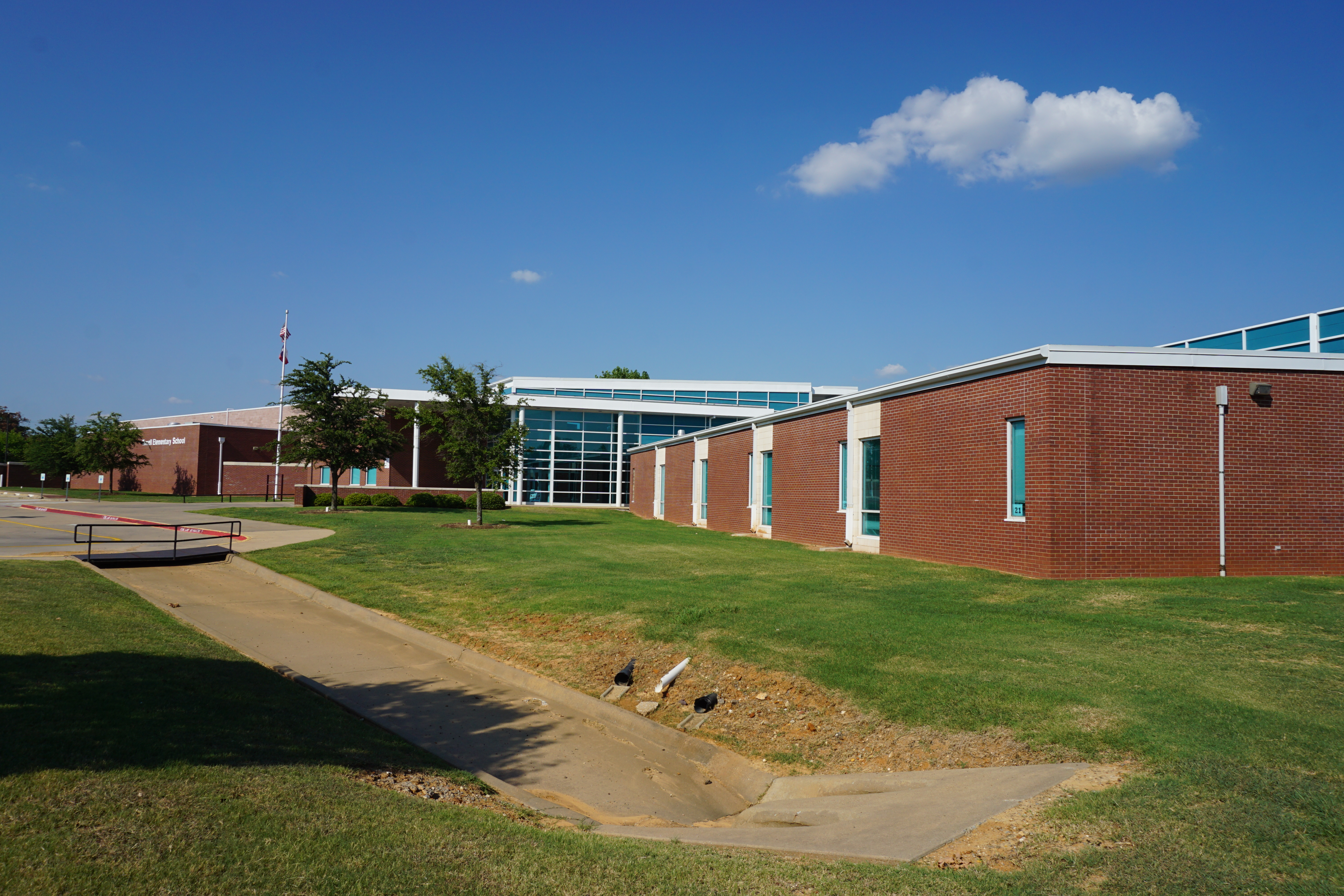
Terrell Elementary School

Denison Independent School District (Denison ISD or DISD) is a public school district based in Denison, Texas, United States. Covering 97 square miles, the district is located in northeastern Grayson County and serves the majority of the City of Denison along with a portion neighboring Sherman.

As of 2026, Denison ISD operates ten campuses, including one high school, two middle schools, five primary schools, one alternative high school, and a District Alternative Education Program (DAEP). The district most recently received a "C" rating from the Texas Education Agency (TEA).

== History ==
Denison ISD's roots date back to the 1800s.

In 1954, a new Denison High School campus was opened. The former high school facility became Denison Junior High School, eventually renamed to McDaniel Junior High School.

Hughes Junior High School opened in 1964. The district operated two junior high schools for some time. However, by 1984, Hughes became a middle school with grades 6-7 and McDaniel served grade 8.

In 1986, the district consolidated its middle schools. The 1913 building permanently closed and Hughes was renamed to B. McDaniel Middle School, serving grades 6-8.

In 2000, Terrell Elementary moved to a new building across the street from the previous school. The former school was demolished, with the land serving as a second playground for the new school.

After a school bond was passed in 2011, Denison ISD began consolidating its smaller elementary schools. Mayes Elementary was expanded, taking in all Layne Elementary students in 2013, as the latter campus permanently closed. Layne Elementary was eventually demolished and its land sold off.

A new Denison High School campus was opened in 2014, and its former 1954 facility became Henry Scott Middle School with grades 7-8. B. McDaniel became an intermediate campus, serving grades 5-6. With 5th grade removed from the elementary schools, Golden Rule Elementary was closed and demolished. Only the gymnasium was spared, and DISD eventually gave this land to the Denison Boys and Girls Club.

Another bond was passed in November 2019 to expand capacities at Mayes and Hyde Park elementaries. In May 2023, another school bond was passed. The result was expansions at Terrell, Lamar, and Houston elementaries and the construction of a new B. McDaniel Intermediate campus.

After the elementary expansions were completed in 2025, all district head start and Pre-K programs were moved to the newly renamed Houston Early Childhood School.

B. McDaniel Intermediate opened its new campus in 2026. The former B. McDaniel facility was renamed the Denison Education Support Center (DESC), consolidated all district administration and support services into one building. The DAEP program moved from Pathways High School to a wing at the DESC in time for the start of the 2026 school year.

In January 2027, Pathways High School will relocate to the former Denison ISD Administration Building and be renamed to the Peabody Academy. The Peabody campus will house students for the first time since 1979.

== Academic achievement ==
Historical district TEA accountability ratings

- 2026: C - 78
- 2025: C - 78
- 2024: B - 81
- 2023: C - 78
- 2022: C - 79
- 2021: No rating given due to COVID-19
- 2020: No rating given due to COVID-19
- 2019: B - 86
- 2018: B - 82
- 2017: Met Standard
- 2016: Met Standard
- 2015: Met Standard
- 2014: Met Standard
- 2013: Met Standard
- 2012: No rating given due to change in ratings system
- 2011: Academically Acceptable
- 2010: Recognized
- 2009: Academically Acceptable
- 2008: Academically Acceptable
- 2007: Academically Acceptable
- 2006: Academically Acceptable
- 2005: Academically Acceptable
- 2004: Academically Acceptable

== Schools ==
=== Secondary schools ===
Secondary schools
Name	Grades	Established	Additional information
Denison High School	9-12	1913	Relocated 1950s, 2014
Henry Scott Middle School	7-8	2014	Opened 2014
B. McDaniel Intermediate School	5-6	1964	Grades 5-6 2014–present, 7-9 (??-1981), 6-7 (1981-1986), 6-8 (1986-2014); Formerly Hughes Junior High (1964-??), B. McDaniel Middle School (??-2014)

=== Primary schools ===
Primary schools
Name	Grades	Established	Additional information
Hyde Park Elementary School	K-4	1891	
Lamar Elementary School	K-4	1890	Campuses opened in 1890, 1910, and 1948.
Mayes Elementary School	K-4	1968	
Terrell Elementary School	K-4	1969	Opened at former Terrell High School campus as integrated 6-8 middle school; converted to elementary school for 1979 school year; new campus opened in 1999
Sam Houston Early Childhood School	PK	1886	Campuses opened in 1886 and 1938. Transitioned from elementary to Pre-K campus in 2025.

=== Alternative schools ===
Alternative schools
Name	Grades	Established	Additional information
Denison Education Support Center	9-12	2026	DAEP program housed in former McDaniel Intermediate campus
Pathways High School	9-12	1997	District credit recovery program; will transition to Peabody Academy in January 2027

=== Former schools ===
School name	Year founded	Year closed	Additional information
Anderson School	1886	1939	
Burleson School	1888		
Central Ward Elementary School	1917	1979	
Dalton School		1965	
Golden Rule Elementary School	2015	2014	
Langston School	1874	1965	First Black school in Denison
Layne Elementary School	1879	2012	
McDaniel Junior High School			Grades 7-9 ??-1981, Grades 8-9 1981-??; Opened as Denison Junior High School at 1913 school building
Oak Grove School			
Peabody School		1979	Current DISD Administration Building; will reopen as Peabody High School in 2026
Raynal School	1891	1979	
Reasor School			
Stevens School	1890	1927	
Terrell High School	1927	1968	Black-only high school
Walton School		1960s	
Washington School	1873	1913	First free public school in Texas
Wims School	1963	1979	
