= Wildlife Safari =

Safari park in Winston, Oregon

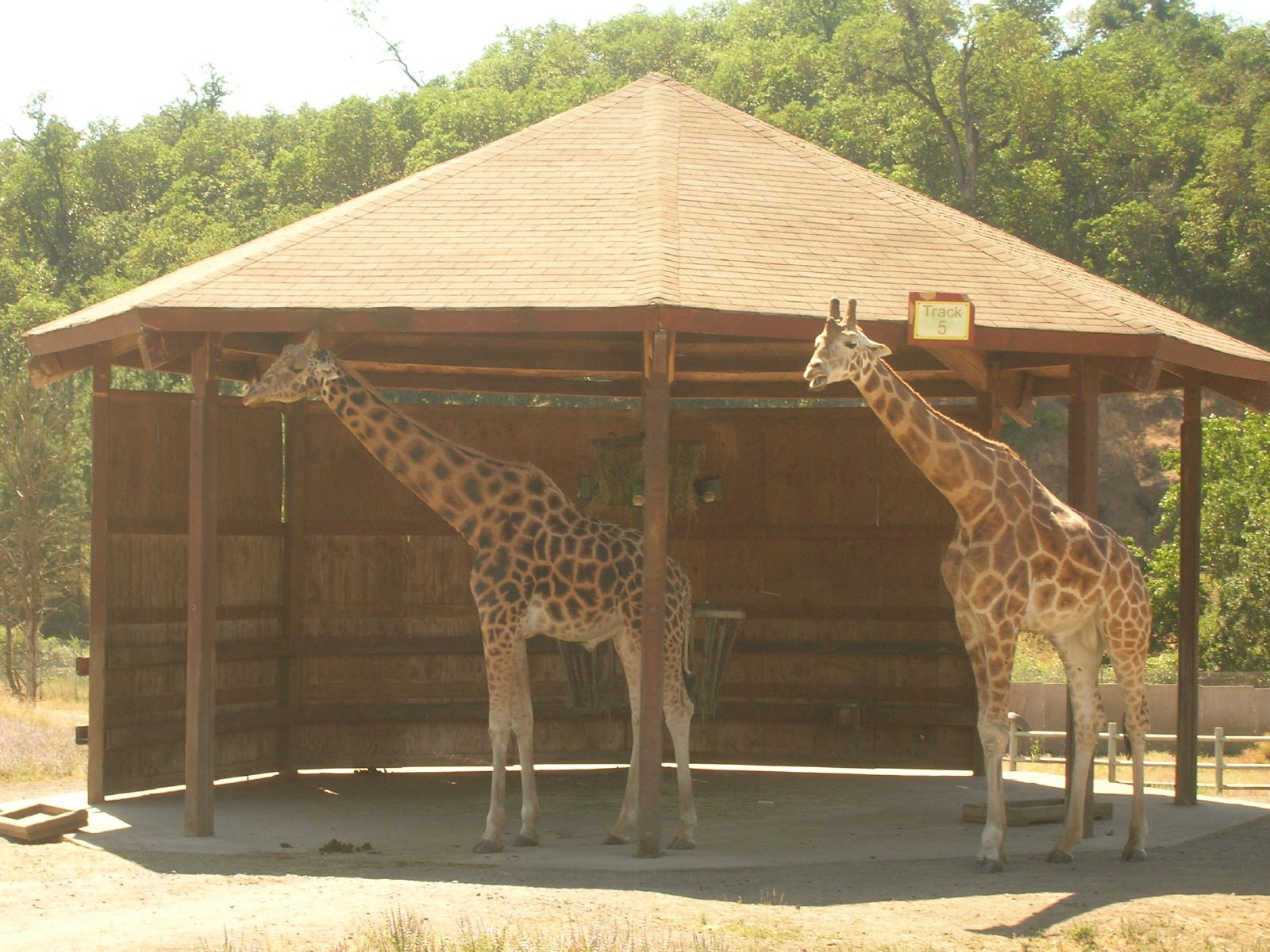
- Interactive map of Wildlife Safari
- 43.1417°N 123.4265°W
- Date opened: October 1972
- Location: 1790 Safari Road; Winston, Oregon, U.S.
- Land area: 615 acres (249 ha)
- No. of animals: Over 600
- No. of species: Over 100
- Memberships: AZA; ZAA
- Website: wildlifesafari.net

Wildlife Safari is a drive-through safari and zoological park in Winston, Oregon, United States. The park’s main draw is the 615-acre (249 ha) pastures and field enclosures visitors drive their vehicles through, enabling many up-close animal encounters and photo opportunities. These field exhibits, divided into regions such as Africa, Asia and the Americas, mainly feature the park’s ungulate herds and larger hoofed mammals (including rhinos, hippos, giraffes and elephants), as well as larger species of birds, including cranes and ratites. Visitors also drive past naturalistic exhibits featuring black and brown bears, cheetahs, lions and tigers.

Wildlife Safari has a visitors’ area in its free Safari Village, which contains the park’s retail, dining, and customer service amenities. The area includes a petting zoo, seasonal camel rides, reptile exhibits, aviaries, animal interactions, as well as walking trails featuring numerous exhibits of the park's smaller species. Wildlife Safari currently maintains Oregon state’s only captive African elephants and maned wolves (as of 2021).

The safari became a member of the Association of Zoos and Aquariums (AZA) in 1986, one of the only privately owned zoological establishments in the AZA, and one of only four such animal attractions in the state. However, it lost accreditation in September 2026. In 2021, it received a certification from the Zoological Association of America.

== History ==
Frank Hart, a frequent visitor to Africa, created the safari park, which opened in October 1972 as World Wildlife Safari, on a 600-acre (240 ha) site. "World" was dropped from the name on June 9, 1974, at the request of the unrelated, non-profit World Wildlife Fund, to avoid confusion. Wildlife Safari became a non-profit organization in 1980, and is overseen by the Safari Game Search Foundation. Two African lionesses, Mtai and Serafina, arrived from the Saint Louis Zoo in late spring of 2014. Mguu, the female southern white rhinoceros, was introduced to its residential southern white rhinos, Taryn and Kayode in September of 2024. She arrived from the North Carolina Zoo. Two African lionesses named Lindelani and Thabisa, arrived from Riverbanks Zoo to join its pride in late 2025.

In September 2026, the facility lost its Association of Zoos and Aquariums accreditation.

== Animals ==
=== Africa ===
- African bush elephant (Loxodonta a. africana) — not drive-through
- Ankole-Watusi cattle (Bos taurus)
- Burchell’s zebra (Equus quagga burchellii)
- Common eland (Taurotragus oryx)
- Dromedary (Camelus dromedarius)
- Lion (Panthera leo)
- Reticulated giraffe (Giraffa reticulata)
- River hippopotamus (Hippopotamus amphibius) — not drive-through
- Scimitar-horned oryx (Oryx dammah) — not drive-through
- South African ostrich (Struthio camelus)
- Southern white rhinoceros (Ceratotherium s. simum)
- White-bearded wildebeest (Connochaetes taurinus)

=== The Americas ===
- American black bear (Ursus americanus) — not drive-through
- Barbary sheep (Ammotragus lervia)
- Grizzly bear (Ursus arctos horribilis) — not drive-through
- Guanaco (Lama guanicoe)
- Plains bison (B. bison bison)
- Roosevelt elk (Cervus canadensis roosevelti)
- Western pond turtle (Actinemys marmorata)

=== Asia ===
- Blackbuck (Antilope cervicapra)
- Emu (Dromaius novaehollandiae)
- Fallow deer (Dama dama)
- Greater rhea (Rhea americana)
- Nilgai (Boselaphus tragocamelus)
- Sika (Cervus nippon)
- White-cheeked gibbon (Nomascus leucogenys)
- White-naped crane (Antigone vipio)
- Yak (Bos grunniens)

== Other facilities ==
The Safari Village includes a narrow gauge railroad, Safari Grill Event Center, Cheryl Ford Center, Safari Grill, and Gift Shop. The village area is a traditional zoo setting with smaller exhibits of animals worldwide. The newest feature of the Safari Village is the Wells Fargo Australian Walkabout exhibit. The Australian Walkabout immerses the guest into Australia allowing guests to go in with the wallaroos, black swans, emu, and the Budgie Aviary.

== Conservation ==
Wildlife Safari has a well-established cheetah breeding program which, as of July 2021, has produced 231 cubs. In cooperation with the AZA's Species Survival Plan, the cubs are sent to other accredited zoos across the United States.

At least one animal rights organization endorses Wildlife Safari for its animal-focused conditions and care.
