= Douglas High School (Winston, Oregon) =

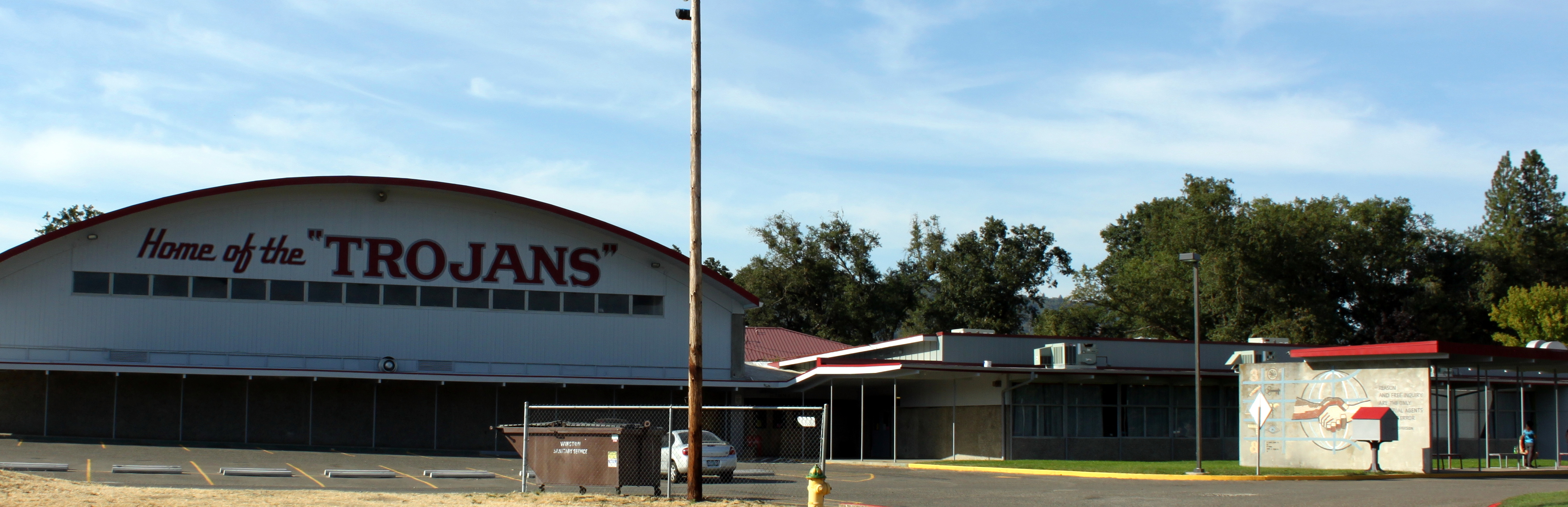

Location
- 1382 NW Douglas Blvd; Winston, Douglas County, Oregon 97496; United States; 43.116018°N 123.43719°W

Information
- Type: Public
- School district: Winston-Dillard School District
- Principal: Craig Anderson
- Teaching staff: 22.00 (FTE)
- Grades: 9-12
- Enrollment: 393 (2022–2023)
- Student to teacher ratio: 17.86
- Colors: Crimson & Gray
- Athletics conference: OSAA Far West League 3A-3
- Mascot: Trojan
- Team name: Douglas Trojans
- Website: dhs.wdsd.org

Douglas High School (DHS) is a public high school in Winston, Oregon, United States. The school had a graduation rate of 72% in 2014

== Academics ==
In 2008, 50% of the school's seniors received their high school diploma. Out of 111 students, 88 graduated, 22 dropped out, 1 received a modified diploma, and 12 are still in high school.

== Notable alumni ==
- Josh Bidwell - football punter, 11 years in the NFL (Green Bay, Tampa Bay, and Washington).
- Dennis Boyd (American football) - football lineman, played 5 years with the Seattle Seahawks.
- Troy Polamalu - football safety, 2020 Pro Football Hall Of Fame inductee, businessman, actor.

== Notable faculty ==
- Bill Wold, professional basketball player
