= Denison High School =

Public school in Texas, United States

Location
- 4200 N Hwy 91; Denison, Texas 75020-6899; United States; 33.7854015°N 96.5516574°W

Information
- School type: Public high school
- Established: 1914
- School district: Denison Independent School District
- Principal: Cavin Boettger
- Teaching staff: 102.81 (FTE)
- Grades: 9-12
- Enrollment: 1,351 (October 2025)
- Student to teacher ratio: 12.84
- Colors: Black & Gold
- Athletics conference: UIL Class AAAAA (5A)
- Mascot: Yellow Jacket
- Rival: Sherman High School
- Yearbook: The Yellow Jacket
- Website: denisonhs.denisonisd.net

Denison High School is a public high school in Denison, Texas, United States and classified as a 5A school by the University Interscholastic League (UIL). It is part of the Denison Independent School District located in north central Grayson County. For the 2025-2026 school year, the school was given an "A" accountability rating by the Texas Education Agency.

== History ==
Denison High School's predecessor was the Educational Institute. Built in 1873, the Educational Institute was the first free, graded school in Texas. In 1914, Denison High School opened on the east side of the same city block on Main Street, replacing the Educational Institute.

In 1954, a Denison High School campus opened on Mirick Street, and the 1914 building was converted to Denison Junior High School.

In 2014, a new Denison High School campus was opened near the corner of US 75 and TX-91 north of town. The 1954 building was converted to Henry Scott Middle School with grades 7-8, named after Denison ISD's long-time superintendent.

== Athletics ==
The Denison Yellow Jackets compete in these sports -

Volleyball, Cross Country, Football, Basketball, Powerlifting, Swimming, Soccer, Golf, Track, Tennis, Softball & Baseball.

=== State titles ===
Denison (UIL)

- Football -
  - 1984(4A)

Denison Terrell (PVIL)

- Football -
  - 1947(PVIL-1A)^, 1948(PVIL-1A)

^Co-Champions

==== State finalists ====
Denison (UIL)

- Football -
  - 1995(4A), 1996(4A), 1997(4A)

== Rivalry ==
Denison High School and neighboring Sherman High School have had a long-standing football rivalry dating back to 1901. Each year, the schools play for "The Battle of the Ax" in which an engraved ax is awarded to the winner. William B. Hempkins led Denison for the first four years running as battle of the ax champions. 84 years later his great-grandson Daniel K Jones led Denison to its next consecutive four years wins against Sherman, and continued his winning streak (12-0) his senior year to win the Texas State Championship against Dallas Carter winning 46–17. This is the longest continuous rivalry among all high schools in the state of Texas.

== Notable alumni ==
- Chesley Sullenberger (Class of 1969) - Airline pilot and safety expert
- SoMo (Class of 2006) - Singer/Songwriter
- Jordan Taylor (Class of 2010) - NFL wide receiver
- Jadarian Price (Class of 2022) - NFL running back
