= Flag of Denison, Texas =

City of Denison
- Adopted: November 13, 1968
- Design: A horizontal triband with green on top, red in the middle, and white on the bottom, with a black vertical stripe running through the middle, with a white star in the center

The city flag of Denison, Texas was designed in 1873, and formally approved on November 13, 1968. It composed of a bicolor of green and white separated by a red stripe, with a black vertical stripe and white star at the center.

== Symbolism ==
The meanings of each of the colors and the star are as follows:

- The green band represents the green grass of Indian Territory (now Oklahoma, located only a few miles to the north).
- The red band represents the nearby Red River.
- The white band represents Texas cotton fields.
- The black vertical stripe bisecting the bands represents the Missouri-Kansas-Texas Railroad (better known as the M-K-T or Katy Railroad, which is now part of the Union Pacific Railroad).
- The star in the middle represents Denison.
