= Clifford Noe =

American conman

Clifford Dixon Noe
- Born: 1930; Oklahoma, U.S.
- Died: 2004 (aged 73–74)
- Other names: Dr. Noe; Clif Goldstein

Clifford Dixon Noe (aka Dr. Noe; aka Clif Goldstein after 1991) (1930–2004) was an international conman and swindler. He specialized in using bogus companies, forged securities, and fictitious offshore accounts to swindle investors. He was included by Fortune magazine on its 1988 list of the 25 most fascinating business people. The magazine said that the FBI ranked Noe as "among the most notorious white-collar criminals ever." He was described by a sentencing judge in England as "an international swindler on the highest level."

Noe was born in Oklahoma, the son of a mortician. His highest education was at Denison, Texas, public schools, but he claimed a number of phony educational credentials including several doctorate degrees. His brother Paul Howe Noe (aka Paul Noe Randell) (born c. 1927) was involved in a number of Clifford's schemes. Throughout his career, Clifford Noe had convictions for wire fraud, mail fraud and forgery in Texas, Illinois, Alabama, Pennsylvania and England. Paul Noe had convictions in Florida, Texas and Georgia.

In 1963, the brothers bought a bank in Texas using money they borrowed using stock in worthless companies, then looted the bank. They were convicted for bank embezzlement, mail fraud and wire fraud, and received five-year suspended sentences and three years probation. In 1970, Noe attempted to buy the British merchant bank E.H. Marley & Partners using bogus certificates of deposit as collateral. The following year he was sentenced to seven years in prison in England. Noe was indicted in 1972 for his involvement in a $150 million fraud involving advance fees (which also involved international swindler Philip Morrell Wilson). Noe testified before the U.S. Senate Permanent Subcommittee on Investigations in 1973 on international bank and mortgage schemes. He was convicted of mail fraud in 1977, interstate transportation of forged securities in 1978 and check forgery in 1982.

In 1986, Noe was arrested for conspiracy for trying to buy the Integrity Insurance Company of Paramus, New Jersey, using $10 million in fraudulent securities. The charges were dropped, but he was indicted in 1987 on the same charges, but then fled to Costa Rica. He was arrested in New Orleans in 1988 and jailed in Pennsylvania, convicted of wire fraud and sentenced to five years in prison. Both brothers were charged in February 2002 by the Securities and Exchange Commission with fraud in a prime bank scheme involving their company Great American Trust Corp. Clifford pleaded guilty to conspiracy to commit wire fraud, and was sentenced in December 2003 to 46 months in prison. His brother Paul was convicted of wire fraud, transportation of stolen securities, and conspiracy to defraud and was sentenced to 78 months in prison. Clifford Noe died shortly after the sentencing.
