= Texoma Medical Center =

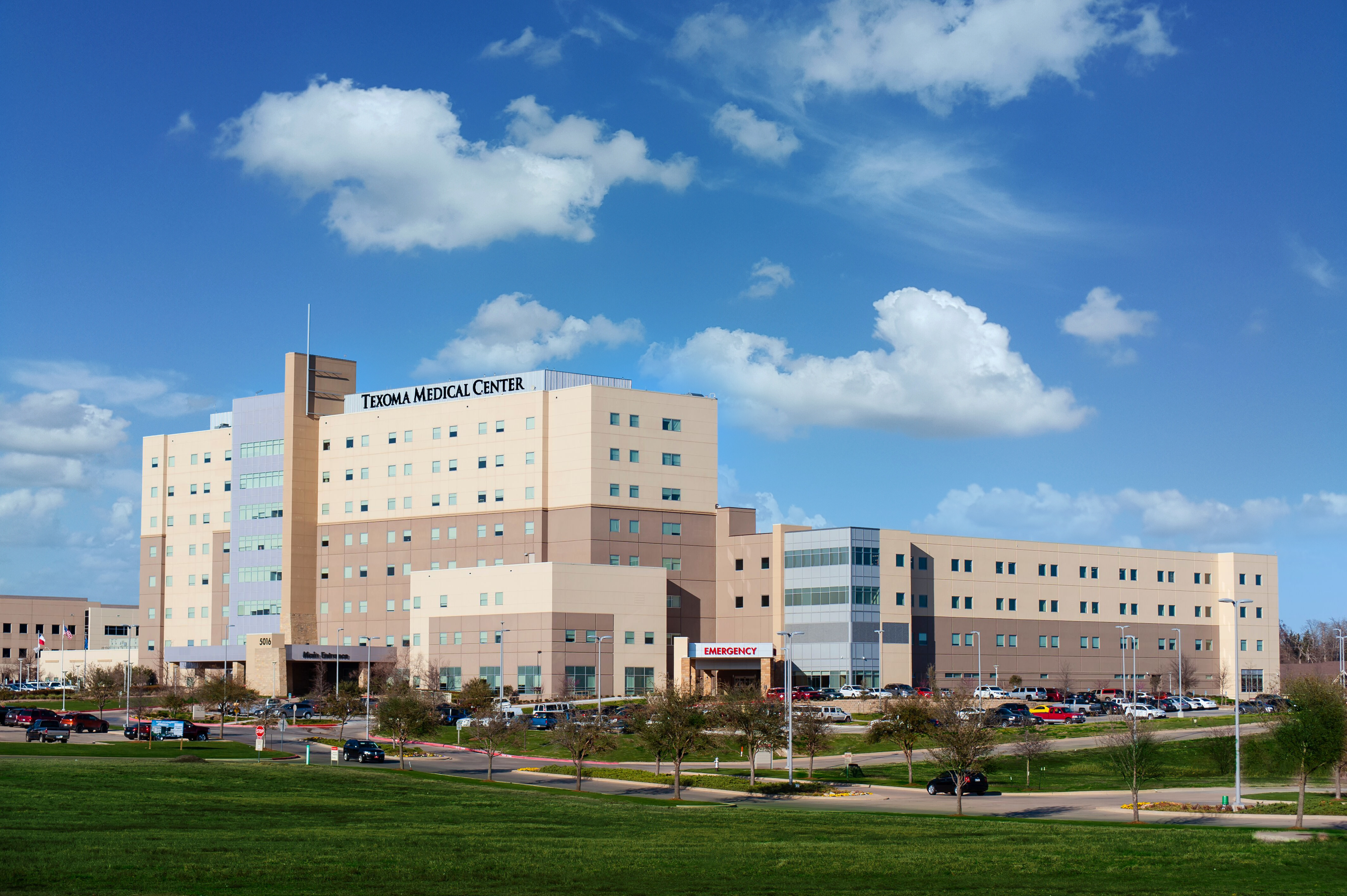
- Texoma Medical Center in 2018

Geography
- Location: Denison, Texas, United States
- Coordinates: 33°42′36″N 96°35′05″W

Services
- Emergency department: State of Texas Designated Level III
- Beds: 414

History
- Founded: 1965

Links
- Website: www.texomamedicalcenter.net
- Lists: Hospitals in Texas

Texoma Medical Center was founded in 1965 in Denison, Texas. A previous location closed and the new facility opened in 2009. It is located an hour away from Dallas, and roughly 25–30 minutes from Durant, Oklahoma. It is called Texoma Medical Center due to its distance to the Texas/Oklahoma border, as it serves parts of North Texas and South Central Oklahoma.
