= Sherman High School (Texas) =

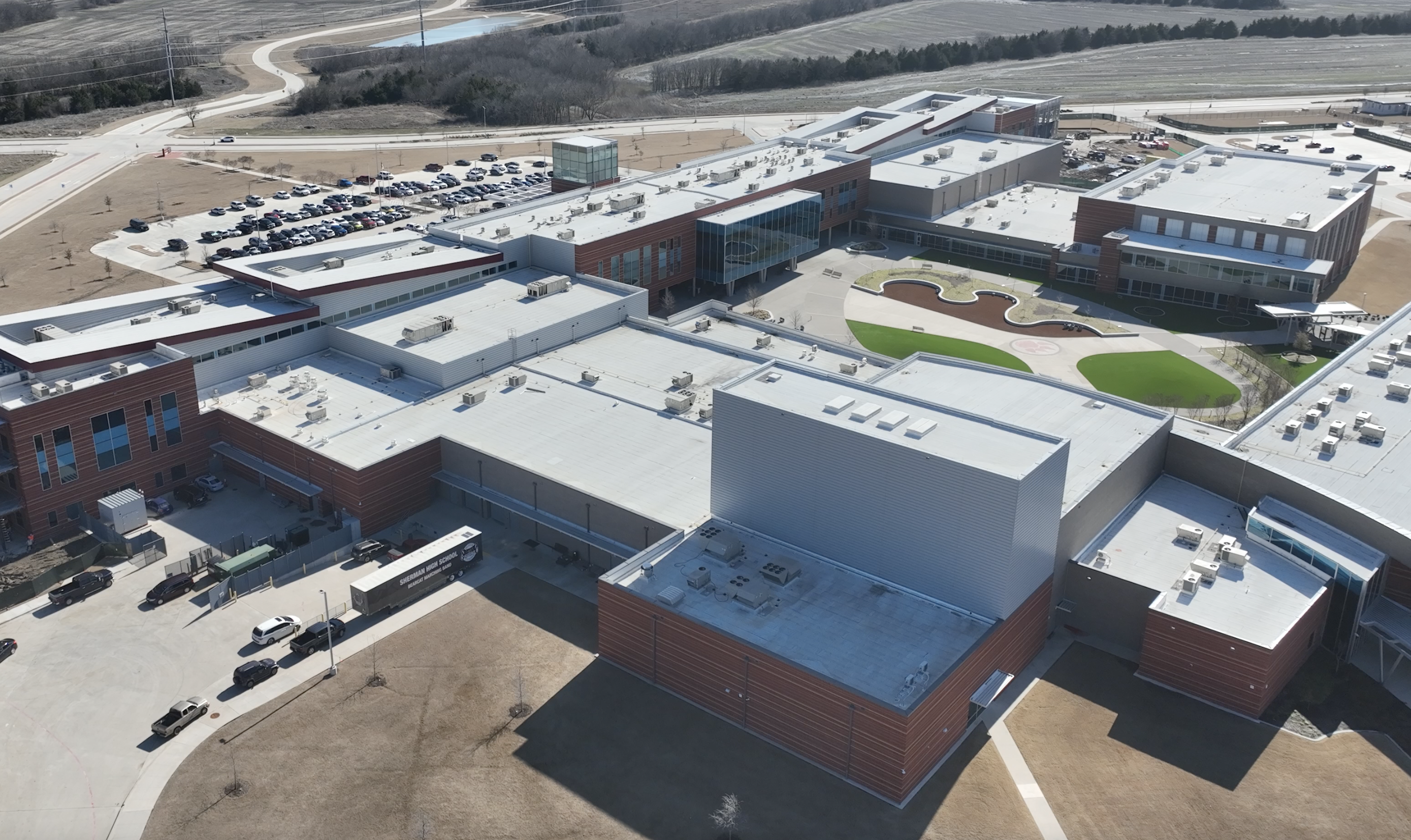

Location
- 2907 W Travis St. Sherman, Texas 75092; USA

Information
- School type: Public high school
- School district: Sherman Independent School District
- Principal: Kristen Perry
- Teaching staff: 158.48 (on an FTE basis)
- Grades: 9-12
- Enrollment: 2,160 (2023-2024)
- Student to teacher ratio: 13.63
- Colors: Maroon & White
- Athletics conference: UIL Class AAAAA
- Mascot: Bearcats
- Website: www.shermanisd.net/shs

Sherman High School is a public high school in Sherman, Texas, United States. It is part of the Sherman Independent School District located in central Grayson County and classified as a 5A school by the UIL. In 2015, the school was rated "Met Standard" by the Texas Education Agency.

== Athletics ==
The Sherman Bearcats compete in cross country, volleyball, football, basketball, powerlifting, swimming, Soccer, golf, track, tennis, softball and baseball.

=== State Titles ===
Sherman (UIL)

- Boys Track -
  - 1921(1A), 1932(All)

Sherman Douglas (PVIL)

- Football -
  - 1964(PVIL-2A)

==== State Finalists ====
Sherman (UIL)

- Baseball -
  - 1964(5A)

Sherman Douglas (PVIL)

- Football –
  - 1965(PVIL-2A)

=== Rivalry ===
Sherman High School and neighboring Denison High School have had a long-standing football rivalry dating back to 1901. Each year, the schools play for "The Battle of the Ax" in which an engraved axe is awarded to the winner. This is the longest continuous rivalry among all high schools in the state of Texas.

== Notable alumni ==
- Charlie Johnson (Class of 2002) - NFL offensive lineman - played for Super Bowl XLI champion Indianapolis Colts.
- Jimmy Hotz (Class of 1971) - Record Producer, Recording Engineer, Inventor, Author, Musician, Audio Expert and Electronic Music Pioneer.
- Curtis Scott Luper (Class of 1984) is an American college football assistant coach at Auburn University
- Hunter Smith (Class of 1995)- NFL punter - played for Super Bowl XLI champion Indianapolis Colts.
- Michael Quinn Sullivan (Class of 1988) - Journalist, conservative political activist
- Jimmy Turner - NFL player
- Kirby Hocutt (Class of 1990) - Athletic Director, Texas Tech University
- Pete Spratt (Class of 1990) - Former Fighter, Ultimate Fighting Championships
- Kyle Crick (Class of 2011) - Major League Baseball (MLB) player
- Chris Gittens (Class of 2012) - MLB player
- John A. Hilger (Class of 1926) - United States Air Force brigadier general and participant of the Doolittle Raid during World War II

== Notable faculty ==
- G. A. Moore — Head Football Coach from 1986-1987
