= Winston, Oregon =

- City
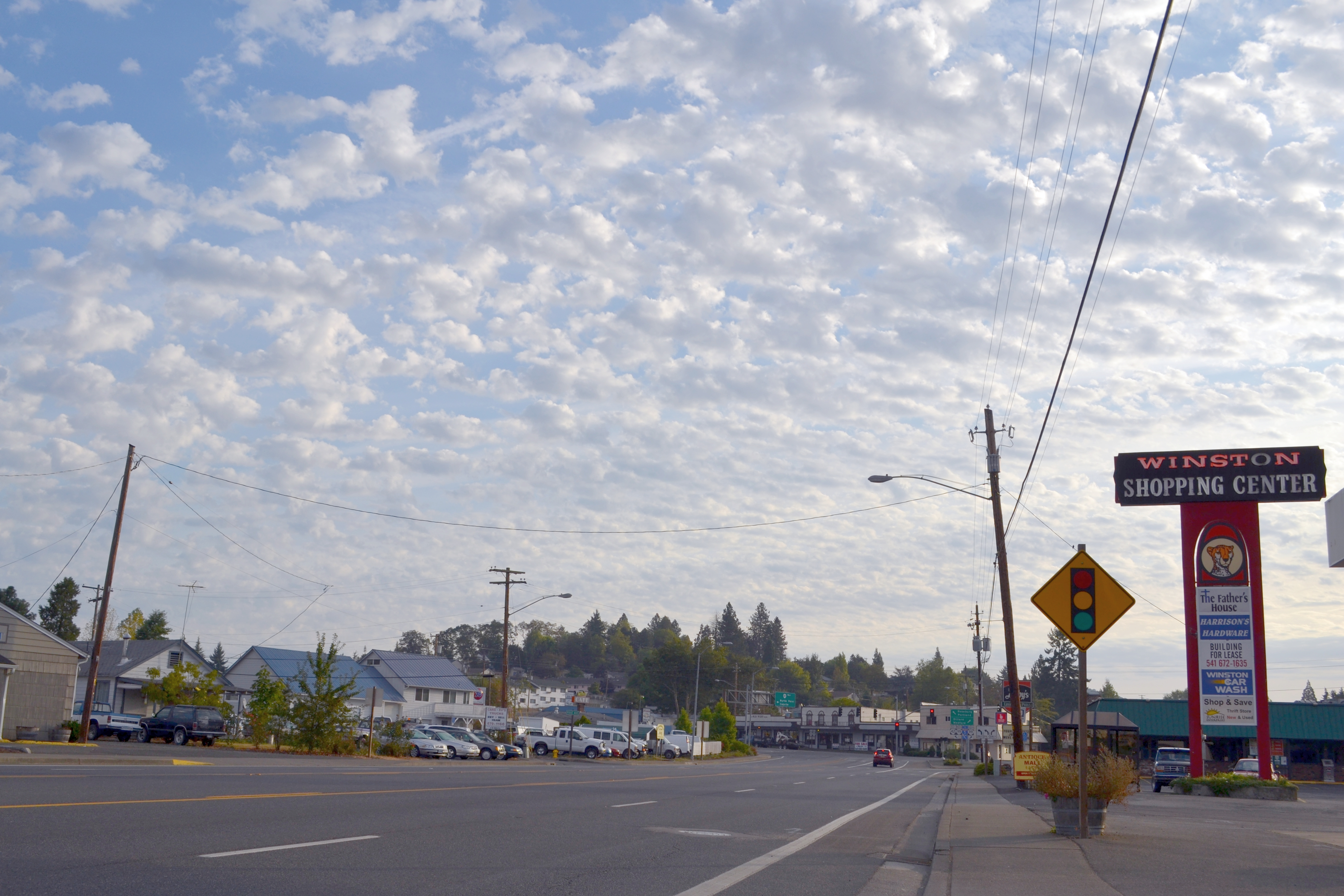
- Motto: "Home of Wildlife Safari"
- Location in Oregon
- Coordinates: 43°07′21″N 123°25′48″W
- Country: United States
- State: Oregon
- County: Douglas
- Incorporated: 1955; 71 years ago

Government
  - Mayor: Christie Glen Knutson

Area
  - Total: 2.76 sq mi (7.15 km^{2})
  - Land: 2.76 sq mi (7.15 km^{2})
  - Water: 0 sq mi (0.00 km^{2})
- Elevation: 528 ft (161 m)

Population (2020)
  - Total: 5,625
  - Density: 2,037.4/sq mi (786.66/km^{2})
- Time zone: UTC-8 (Pacific)
  - Summer (DST): UTC-7 (Pacific)
- ZIP code: 97496
- Area code: 541
- FIPS code: 41-83400
- GNIS feature ID: 2412287
- Website: winstoncity.org

Winston is a city in Douglas County, Oregon, United States, located 7 miles southwest of Roseburg. The population was 5,379 according to the 2010 United States census. Winston is best known as the home of Wildlife Safari.

== History ==
In 1920, Oregon Route 99 was completed, directly linking Winston with the nearby community of Dillard, which had previously been separated by the Umpqua River.

In 1953, the city was incorporated under the name "Coos Junction". The first City Recorder (Gene Geyer) was employed. The following year, Paul Bender was appointed as the mayor of Coos Junction. In 1955, a new City Charter was approved, and the town was officially renamed to Winston.

The Wildlife Safari was opened in 1972. In 1986, a bronze statue was placed at the triangular junction in the center of town, in remembrance of Khayam, a cheetah from the safari who died of kidney failure.

== Geography ==
According to the United States Census Bureau, the city has a total area of 2.65 square miles (6.86 km^{2}), all of it being land.

=== Climate ===
Winston has a typical western Oregon Mediterranean climate (Köppen Csb), characterized by dry summers with cool mornings and hot afternoons, and chilly, rainy winters.

Climate data for Winston, Oregon
Month	Jan	Feb	Mar	Apr	May	Jun	Jul	Aug	Sep	Oct	Nov	Dec	Year
Record high °F (°C)	72 (22)	78 (26)	85 (29)	95 (35)	107 (42)	110 (43)	111 (44)	110 (43)	106 (41)	101 (38)	79 (26)	73 (23)	111 (44)
Mean daily maximum °F (°C)	49.6 (9.8)	53.8 (12.1)	58.7 (14.8)	63.2 (17.3)	70.4 (21.3)	76.4 (24.7)	84.7 (29.3)	85.1 (29.5)	79.4 (26.3)	67.2 (19.6)	54.1 (12.3)	47.9 (8.8)	65.9 (18.8)
Mean daily minimum °F (°C)	36.0 (2.2)	36.5 (2.5)	38.5 (3.6)	41.3 (5.2)	46.3 (7.9)	51.3 (10.7)	55.6 (13.1)	54.8 (12.7)	50.0 (10.0)	44.0 (6.7)	40.0 (4.4)	36.0 (2.2)	44.2 (6.8)
Record low °F (°C)	9 (−13)	3 (−16)	25 (−4)	26 (−3)	29 (−2)	36 (2)	41 (5)	41 (5)	34 (1)	21 (−6)	12 (−11)	3 (−16)	3 (−16)
Average precipitation inches (mm)	5.02 (128)	4.32 (110)	3.86 (98)	2.76 (70)	1.92 (49)	1.11 (28)	0.42 (11)	0.61 (15)	1.21 (31)	2.42 (61)	6.10 (155)	6.17 (157)	35.92 (913)
Average snowfall inches (cm)	0 (0)	0.3 (0.76)	0 (0)	0 (0)	0 (0)	0 (0)	0 (0)	0 (0)	0 (0)	0 (0)	0 (0)	0.2 (0.51)	0.5 (1.3)

=== Demographics ===
Historical population
Census	Pop.	Note	%±
1960	2,395		—
1970	2,468		3.0%
1980	3,359		36.1%
1990	3,773		12.3%
2000	4,613		22.3%
2010	5,379		16.6%
2020	5,625		4.6%
2021 (est.)	5,665		0.7%
U.S. Decennial Census

=== 2020 census ===
As of the 2020 census, Winston had a population of 5,625. The median age was 41.1 years. 22.3% of residents were under the age of 18 and 20.9% of residents were 65 years of age or older. For every 100 females there were 96.0 males, and for every 100 females age 18 and over there were 92.9 males age 18 and over.

98.2% of residents lived in urban areas, while 1.8% lived in rural areas.

There were 2,280 households in Winston, of which 29.3% had children under the age of 18 living in them. Of all households, 43.5% were married-couple households, 18.0% were households with a male householder and no spouse or partner present, and 28.6% were households with a female householder and no spouse or partner present. About 25.7% of all households were made up of individuals and 12.7% had someone living alone who was 65 years of age or older.

There were 2,384 housing units, of which 4.4% were vacant. Among occupied housing units, 64.9% were owner-occupied and 35.1% were renter-occupied. The homeowner vacancy rate was 1.1% and the rental vacancy rate was 3.6%.

Racial composition as of the 2020 census
Race	Number	Percent
White	4,848	86.2%
Black or African American	31	0.6%
American Indian and Alaska Native	113	2.0%
Asian	70	1.2%
Native Hawaiian and Other Pacific Islander	1	<0.1%
Some other race	120	2.1%
Two or more races	442	7.9%
Hispanic or Latino (of any race)	313	5.6%

=== 2010 census ===
As of the 2010 census, there were 5,379 people, 2,140 households, and 1,483 families living in the city. The population density was 2,029.8 inhabitants per square mile (783.7/km^{2}). There were 2,316 housing units at an average density of 874.0 per square mile (337.5/km^{2}). The racial makeup of the city was 92.5% White, 0.3% African American, 1.6% Native American, 0.9% Asian, 0.1% Pacific Islander, 1.1% from other races, and 3.5% from two or more races. Hispanic or Latino of any race were 4.5% of the population.

There were 2,140 households, of which 33.8% had children under the age of 18 living with them, 48.2% were married couples living together, 14.3% had a female householder with no husband present, 6.8% had a male householder with no wife present, and 30.7% were non-families. 24.0% of all households were made up of individuals, and 10.5% had someone living alone who was 65 years of age or older. The average household size was 2.50 and the average family size was 2.87.

The median age in the city was 38.9 years. 24.5% of residents were under the age of 18; 8.1% were between the ages of 18 and 24; 24% were from 25 to 44; 26.2% were from 45 to 64; and 17% were 65 years of age or older. The gender makeup of the city was 48.6% male and 51.4% female.

=== 2000 census ===
As of the 2000 census, there were 4,613 people, 1,753 households, and 1,269 families living in the city. The population density was 2,152.5 inhabitants per square mile (831.1/km^{2}). There were 1,892 housing units at an average density of 882.8 per square mile (340.9/km^{2}). The racial makeup of the city was 94.58% White, 0.15% African American, 1.37% Native American, 0.52% Asian, 0.07% Pacific Islander, 1.24% from other races, and 2.08% from two or more races. Hispanic or Latino of any race were 2.84% of the population.

There were 1,753 households, out of which 37.6% had children under the age of 18 living with them, 52.6% were married couples living together, 15.2% had a female householder with no husband present, and 27.6% were non-families. 21.8% of all households were made up of individuals, and 9.8% had someone living alone who was 65 years of age or older. The average household size was 2.61 and the average family size was 2.99.

In the city, the population was spread out, with 28.8% under the age of 18, 9.9% from 18 to 24, 26.6% from 25 to 44, 20.5% from 45 to 64, and 14.2% who were 65 years of age or older. The median age was 34 years. For every 100 females, there were 93.2 males. For every 100 females age 18 and over, there were 87.3 males.

The median income for a household in the city was $28,939, and the median income for a family was $36,006. Males had a median income of $30,909 versus $18,555 for females. The per capita income for the city was $13,299. About 13.7% of families and 16.9% of the population were below the poverty line, including 24.8% of those under age 18 and 11.8% of those age 65 or over.

== Education ==
Winston is home to the Winston-Dillard School District. The District comprises the Douglas High School, Winston Middle School, Brockway Elementary, McGovern Elementary and Lookingglass Elementary. Winston is also the home of a K-12 private school, Umpqua Valley Christian School.

== Notable people ==
- Josh Bidwell, professional football player for the Green Bay Packers and Tampa Bay Buccaneers
- Troy Polamalu, professional football player for the Pittsburgh Steelers

== Sister cities ==
Winston has two sister cities:

- Tokoroa, New Zealand
- Rosarito Beach, Mexico
