= Josh Bidwell =

American football player (born 1976)

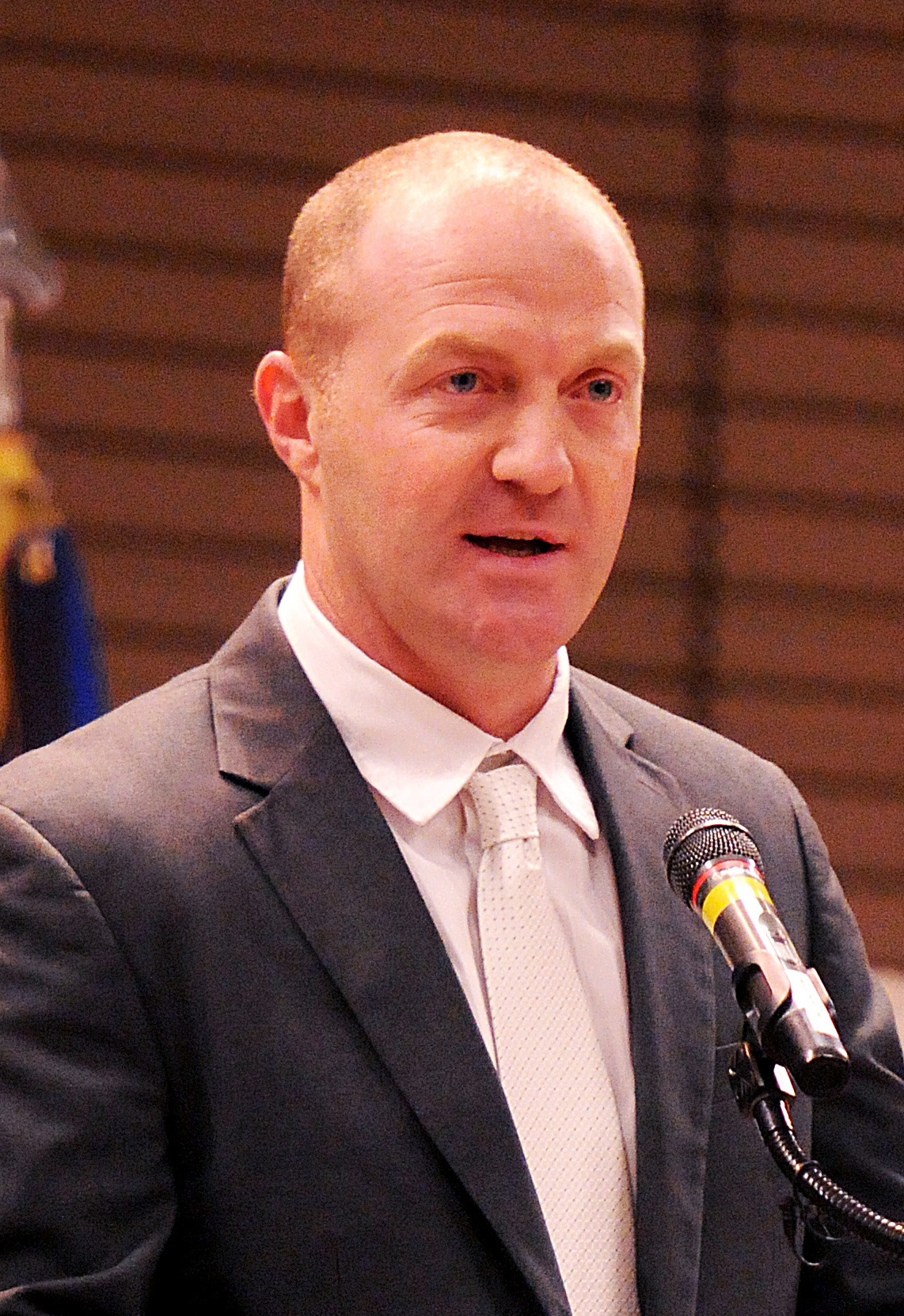
- Bidwell in 2011

No. 9, 6
- Position: Punter

Personal information
- Born: March 13, 1976 (age 50); Winston, Oregon, U.S.
- Listed height: 6 ft 3 in (1.91 m)
- Listed weight: 220 lb (100 kg)

Career information
- High school: Douglas (Winston)
- College: Oregon
- NFL draft: 1999: 4th round, 133rd overall pick

Career history
- Green Bay Packers (1999–2003); Tampa Bay Buccaneers (2004–2009); Washington Redskins (2010)

Awards and highlights
- Second-team All-Pro (2005); Pro Bowl (2005); Second-team All-American (1998); First-team All-Pac-10 (1998)

Career NFL statistics
- Punts: 742
- Punting yards: 31,710
- Punting average: 42.7
- Stats at Pro Football Reference

Joshua John Bidwell (born March 13, 1976) is an American former professional football player who was a punter for 12 seasons in the National Football League (NFL). He played college football for the Oregon Ducks. He was selected by the Green Bay Packers in the fourth round of the 1999 NFL Draft, and also played for the Tampa Bay Buccaneers and Washington Redskins. He was selected to the Pro Bowl in 2005.

== Professional career ==
=== Green Bay Packers ===
Bidwell was drafted 133rd overall by the Green Bay Packers in the fourth round of the 1999 draft. He was diagnosed with testicular cancer on September 1, 1999, and was placed on the reserve/non-football illness list on September 5. In 2000, Bidwell beat out Tom Hutton for the starting punting job. He was re-signed to a one-year contract worth $605,000 on April 30, 2003.

=== Tampa Bay Buccaneers ===
The Tampa Bay Buccaneers signed Bidwell to a three-year contract on March 13, 2004. He was selected to the Pro Bowl following the 2005 season. On November 27, 2006, he signed a contract extension with the Buccaneers. He was placed on injured reserve due to a hip injury on August 17, 2009. The Buccaneers released him on March 4, 2010.

=== Washington Redskins ===
On March 23, 2010, Bidwell signed with the Washington Redskins. After one season with the team, he was released on July 28, 2011.

=== Career statistics ===
| Year | Team | Games | Punts | Gross Punting Average | Longest Punt | Gross Punting Yards | Blocked Punts | Touchbacks | Touchback Percentage | Punts Inside the 20 | Punts Inside the 20 Percentage | Punt Return Attempts | Punt Return Yards | Average Return Yards | Net Punt Average |
|---|---|---|---|---|---|---|---|---|---|---|---|---|---|---|---|
| 2000 | GB | 16 | 78 | 38.5 | 53 | 3,003 | 0 | 5 | 6.4 | 22 | 28.2 | 27 | 205 | 7.6 | 35.9 |
| 2001 | GB | 16 | 82 | 42.5 | 68 | 3,485 | 0 | 10 | 12.2 | 21 | 25.6 | 34 | 288 | 8.5 | 39.0 |
| 2002 | GB | 16 | 79 | 41.7 | 57 | 3,296 | 0 | 6 | 7.6 | 26 | 32.9 | 41 | 357 | 8.7 | 37.2 |
| 2003 | GB | 16 | 69 | 41.7 | 60 | 2,875 | 0 | 7 | 10.1 | 16 | 23.2 | 32 | 316 | 9.9 | 37.1 |
| 2004 | TB | 16 | 82 | 42.3 | 60 | 3,472 | 1 | 7 | 8.5 | 23 | 28.0 | 31 | 279 | 9.0 | 38.9 |
| 2005 | TB | 16 | 90 | 45.6 | 61 | 4,101 | 0 | 13 | 14.4 | 24 | 26.7 | 49 | 466 | 9.5 | 40.4 |
| 2006 | TB | 16 | 93 | 43.5 | 59 | 4,045 | 0 | 7 | 7.5 | 20 | 21.5 | 50 | 487 | 9.7 | 38.3 |
| 2007 | TB | 16 | 77 | 43.9 | 61 | 3,382 | 1 | 10 | 13.0 | 30 | 39.0 | 38 | 280 | 7.4 | 40.3 |
| 2008 | TB | 16 | 77 | 44.5 | 64 | 3,426 | 0 | 7 | 9.1 | 27 | 35.1 | 39 | 392 | 10.1 | 39.4 |
| 2010 | WSH | 4 | 15 | 41.7 | 52 | 625 | 0 | 0 | 0.0 | 3 | 20.0 | 7 | 59 | 8.4 | 37.7 |
| Totals | Totals | 148 | 742 | 42.7 | 68 | 31,710 | 2 | 72 | 9.7 | 212 | 28.6 | 348 | 3,129 | 9.0 | 38.3 |
