= Texas State Highway 56 =

State highway in Grayson and Fannin counties in Texas, United States

State Highway 56

Route information
- Maintained by TxDOT
- Length: 64.468 mi (103.751 km)
- Existed: April 7, 1974–present

Major junctions
- West end: US 82 near Whitesboro
- US 377 in Whitesboro; US 75 in Sherman; US 69 in Bells
- East end: US 82 near Honey Grove

Location
- Country: United States
- State: Texas
- Counties: Grayson; Fannin

Highway system
- Highways in Texas; Interstate; US; State; Former; Toll; Loops; Spurs; FM/RM; Park; Rec
← SH 55	→ US 57

State Highway 56 (SH 56) is a state highway Grayson and Fannin counties in north-central Texas, United States. This highway was designated in 1974 to replace U.S. Highway 82 (US 82) when it was rerouted north of Whitesboro and Sherman. SH 56 has been extended further since then as the US 82 bypass continued to be extended north of Bonham and Honey Grove.

Through Sherman, SH 56 operates on a pair of one-way streets, Lamar (eastbound) and Houston (westbound).

== Route description ==
SH 56 begins at an intersection with US 82 just outside of Whitesboro. The highway then enters Whitesboro with indirect access to US 377. SH 56 next travels through Southmayd, where it meets SH 289, before entering Sherman. Just east of Farm to Market Road 1417 (FM 1417), the highway splits into a pair of one–way streets, with eastbound traffic traveling on Lamar Street and westbound on Houston Street. SH 56 meets US 75 before entering downtown Sherman. The highway merges back into one street, just before SH 11 before leaving Sherman. SH 56 runs through a generally undeveloped area of Grayson County before entering Bells, where the highway meets US 69. Between Bells and Savoy, SH 56 enters Fannin County. The highway runs through Ector, before entering Bonham where it meets SH 121 and SH 78. SH 56 runs through Dodd City, Windom and Honey Grove before ending at an intersection with US 82.

== History ==
Historic SH 56

SH 56 was originally designated on August 21, 1923, through the northwestern Panhandle, replacing SH 5D. Construction was completed by September 26, 1939, when the SH 56 designation was dropped in favor of US 54. SH 56 was designated on April 7, 1974, from US 82 southeast to FM 1417. On August 26, 1993, SH 56 was extended east to US 82 at the Lamar County line, its current terminus. Parts were concurrent with US 82 until the US 82 bypass opened.

== Major intersections ==
County	Location	mi	km	Destinations	Notes
Grayson				US 82 – Gainesville, Sherman	Western terminus
Grayson	Whitesboro			Bus. US 377 (Union Street)	
Grayson	Whitesboro			Spur 129 west to US 377 – Denton	Eastern terminus of Spur 129
Grayson				FM 901 south	Western end of FM 901 concurrency
Grayson				FM 901 north – Sadler	Eastern end of FM 901 concurrency
Grayson	Southmayd			SH 289 – Pottsboro, Dallas	Interchange
Grayson	Sherman			FM 1417 (Heritage Parkway) – Pottsboro, North Texas Regional Airport	Interchange
Grayson	Sherman			US 75 – Denison, Dallas	US 75 exit 58
Grayson	Sherman			SH 11 east – Tom Bean	
Grayson				FM 1417 north	Southern terminus of FM 1417
Grayson	Bells			US 69 – Denison, Greenville	
Fannin	Savoy			FM 1752 – Whitewright	
Fannin	Ector			FM 898 – Caddo National Grassland	
Fannin	Bonham			SH 121 south – McKinney	Western end of SH 121 concurrency
Fannin	Bonham			SH 121 north – Durant	Eastern end of SH 121 concurrency
Fannin	Bonham			SH 78 – Durant, Leonard	
Fannin	Dodd City			FM 2077 south	Northern terminus of FM 2077
Fannin				FM 897 north	Southern terminus of FM 897
Fannin	Windom			FM 1743	
Fannin				FM 1396 west – Caddo National Grassland	Eastern terminus of FM 1396
Fannin	Honey Grove			SH 34 south – Wolfe City	Western end of SH 34 concurrency
Fannin	Honey Grove			SH 34 north – Caddo National Grassland	Eastern end of SH 34 concurrency
Fannin	Honey Grove			FM 824 east	Western terminus of FM 824
Fannin				US 82 – Sherman, Paris	Eastern terminus
1.000 mi = 1.609 km; 1.000 km = 0.621 mi: Concurrency terminus

== See also ==
- List of state highways in Texas
- List of highways numbered 56
