= Farm to Market Road 1417 =

Road in Texas, United States

Farm to Market Road 1417

Route information
- Maintained by TxDOT
- Length: 17.598 mi (28.321 km)
- Existed: 1958–present

Eastern leg
- Length: 1.4 mi (2.3 km)
- CCW end: US 82 in Sherman
- CW end: SH 56

Western leg
- Length: 16.1 mi (25.9 km)
- CCW end: SH 11
- Major intersections: US 75 in Sherman; US 82 in Sherman
- CW end: FM 120 in Denison

Location
- Country: United States
- State: Texas
- Counties: Grayson

Highway system
- Highways in Texas; Interstate; US; State; Former; Toll; Loops; Spurs; FM/RM; Park; Rec
← FM 1416	→ FM 1418

Farm to Market Road 1417 (FM 1417) is an FM highway that exists in two disconnected sections. The highway serves as a quasi beltway for the Sherman-Denison metropolitan area. The entire route was previously internally designated by the TxDOT as Urban Road 1417 (UR 1417).

== Route description ==
=== Eastern leg ===
FM 1417 begins at an interchange with US 82 in the easternmost part of Sherman. The highway leaves the city limits just south of here, running in unincorporated Grayson County. FM 1417 ends at an intersection with State Highway 56.

=== Western leg ===
The "main" section of FM 1417 begins at an intersection with State Highway 11 southeast of Sherman. The highway enters the city's southside, intersecting US 75. At Old Dorchester Road, FM 1417 turns to the north, running along the western edge of Sherman. The highway sees slightly more development along its route, interchanging with State Highway 56. Between SH 56 and US 82, FM 1417 runs near many housing developments on the city's westside. North of US 82 the highway briefly enters Denison, running just east of North Texas Regional Airport and Grayson County College. FM 1417 reenters Denison, ending at FM 120 just east of Pottsboro.

== History ==
The FM 1417 designation was previously assigned to a road in Tyler County on July 14, 1949. It was designated to go from US 69 in Colmesneil southeastward 6.0 miles (9.7 km). On November 20, 1951, FM 1417 was extended southeast 4.8 miles (7.7 km) to a road intersection. On December 17, 1952, the road was extended southeast to US 190. On January 29, 1953, FM 1417 was cancelled and mileage was transferred to an extension of FM 256. The current FM 1417 was first designated on October 31, 1958, running from US 75 to FM 120. On June 28, 1963, an extension to what is now SH 56 was designated. The section from SH 11 to SH 56 was never constructed. On July 31, 1972, FM 1417 was extended north to US 82. On June 27, 1995, FM 1417 was redesignated as an Urban Road 1417 (UR 1417). On November 15, 2018, the road was redesignated back to FM 1417.

== Junction list ==
The entire route is in Grayson County.

Location	mi	km	Destinations	Notes
Sherman	0.0	0.0	US 82 – Bonham, Gainesville	CCW end of eastern leg; US 82 exit 645
	1.4	2.3	SH 56 – Bonham, Sherman	CW end of eastern leg
Gap in route
	0.0	0.0	SH 11 – Tom Bean, Sherman	CCW end of western leg
Sherman	1.9	3.1	US 75 (Sam Rayburn Freeway) – McKinney, Sherman	US 75 exit 56
Sherman	6.5	10.5	SH 56 (Houston Street) – Whitesboro, Sherman	Interchange
Sherman	9.6	15.4	US 82 (Buck Owens Freeway) – Gainesville, Bonham	US 82 exit 640
Denison	12.3	19.8	FM 691 – North Texas Regional Airport, Grayson County College, Denison	
	15.3	24.6	FM 996 west – Pottsboro	
Denison	16.1	25.9	FM 120 – Pottsboro, Denison	CW end of western leg
1.000 mi = 1.609 km; 1.000 km = 0.621 mi
