= S and S Consolidated Independent School District =

School district in Texas, United States

Address
- 300 Ram Drive Sadler, TX, USA ESC Region 10
- Coordinates: 33°40′53″N 96°50′58″W

District information
- Type: Independent School District
- Motto: Three Schools, Two Towns, One Family.
- Grades: PK-12
- Established: 1960
- Superintendent: Dr. Jeff Russell
- Governing agency: Texas Education Agency
- Schools: 3
- NCES District ID: 4838400

Students and staff
- Students: 924 (2025-26)
- Athletic conference: UIL Class AAA
- District mascot: Rams
- Colors: Red and Gold

Other information
- Website: www.sscisd.net

S and S Consolidated Independent School District (S&S CISD) is a public school district based in Sadler, Texas, United States, and formed by the merger of Sadler ISD and Southmayd ISD in 1960. Covering 130 square miles in central Grayson County, S&S CISD serves the cities of Sadler and Southmayd, as well as their surrounding areas and a portion of Sherman.

As of 2026, S&S CISD operates three campuses, including one high school, one middle school, and one elementary school. The district most recently received a C rating from the Texas Education Agency (TEA).

== About ==
The district serves the cities of Sadler and Southmayd as well as rural areas in west central Grayson County, and was formed by consolidation of prior districts in 1961. The first graduating class from S&S was in 1961.

Though Southmayd is the larger of the two towns, the first alphabetically is Sadler, and the location of the administration building, but the "S&S" does not necessarily mean "Southmayd and Sadler" and the district does not state which S stands for which community.

In 2009, the school district was rated "recognized" by the Texas Education Agency.

== Schools ==
S&S Consolidated ISD has a total of three schools - two in Sadler and one in Southmayd.

- S&S Consolidated High (Grades 9-12, Sadler)
  - S&S High won the UIL Current Issues and Events team competition for Class 2A for 15 consecutive years (the streak ended in 2009), winning eight state titles during this time. S&S regained the team title in 2010 and repeated (in a tie with Jim Ned High School) in 2011. In addition, S&S High has also won team titles in Literary Criticism (2002–2003, 2006–07, 2007–08, and 2008–09) as well as the 2003-04 individual titles in this event.
- S&S Consolidated Middle (Grades 5-8, Sadler)
- S&S Consolidated Elementary (Grades PK-4, Southmayd)
