= Ector =

Ector can refer to:

- A variation of the name Hector
- Ector, a city in Fannin County, Texas
- Ector County, Texas
- Sir Ector, King Arthur's foster father in medieval legend
- Ector de Maris, half brother of Lancelot
