= Ted Wright =

American football player (1913–1983)

Profile
- Positions: Halfback, quarterback

Personal information
- Born: November 15, 1913; Savoy, Texas, U.S.
- Died: December 1, 1983 (aged 70)

Career information
- High school: Sherman (Sherman, Texas)
- College: North Texas State Teachers

Career history

Playing
- Boston Redskins (1934–1935); Brooklyn Dodgers (1935)

Coaching
- Albuquerque AAB (1942) Assistant coach; Minter Field (1945) Head coach

Career statistics
- Games played: 19
- Rushing yards: 166
- Touchdowns: 1
- Stats at Pro Football Reference

This is about the American football player; for others, see Theodore Wright (disambiguation).

Weldon H. "Ted" Wright (November 15, 1913 – December 1, 1983) was an American football player and coach. He played professionally as a halfback and quarterback in the National Football League (NFL) for the Boston Redskins and the Brooklyn Dodgers in 1935. Wrightplayed college football at North Texas State Teachers College.

== Early life ==
Wright was born in Savoy, Texas and attended Sherman High School in Sherman, Texas.

== College career ==
Wright attended and played college football at North Texas State Teachers College, now known as the University of North Texas. He became the first player from North Texas to play in the NFL.

== Professional career ==
Wright was signed by the Boston Redskins, where he played in 1934 and part of 1935. In November, he was purchased by the Brooklyn Dodgers, where he played for the remainder of the season.

== Military service and coaching career ==
Wright served as an officer in the United States Army Air Forces during World War II, reaching the rank of lieutenant. He was the head coach of the 1945 Minter Field Atomic Bombers football team.

== Head coaching record ==
Year	Team	Overall	Conference	Standing	Bowl/playoffs
Minter Field Atomic Bombers (Independent) (1945)
1945	Minter Field	4–2–1			
Minter Field:		4–2–1			
Total:		4–2–1			
