= Ector, Texas =

- City
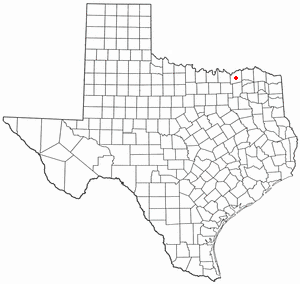
- Location of Ector shown in Texas

- Coordinates: 33°34′45″N 96°16′23″W
- Country: United States
- State: Texas
- County: Fannin

Area
  - Total: 1.17 sq mi (3.04 km^{2})
  - Land: 1.17 sq mi (3.04 km^{2})
  - Water: 0 sq mi (0.00 km^{2})
- Elevation: 650 ft (200 m)

Population (2020)
  - Total: 737
  - Density: 628/sq mi (242/km^{2})
- Time zone: UTC-6 (Central (CST))
  - Summer (DST): UTC-5 (CDT)
- ZIP code: 75439
- Area codes: 903, 430
- FIPS code: 48-22516
- GNIS feature ID: 2410395

Ector is a city in Fannin County, Texas, United States. Its population was 737 at the 2020 census, up from 695 at the 2010 census.

== Geography ==
Ector is located in western Fannin County. Texas State Highway 56 runs through the center of town, leading east 6 miles (10 km) to Bonham, the county seat, and west 5.5 miles (8.9 km) to Savoy.

According to the United States Census Bureau, the city has a total area of 1.17 square miles (3.04 km^{2}), all land.

== Demographics ==
Historical population
Census	Pop.	Note	%±
1910	404		—
1920	454		12.4%
1930	397		−12.6%
1940	457		15.1%
1950	430		−5.9%
1960	519		20.7%
1970	549		5.8%
1980	573		4.4%
1990	494		−13.8%
2000	600		21.5%
2010	695		15.8%
2020	737		6.0%
U.S. Decennial Census; 2020 Census

=== 2020 census ===
As of the 2020 census, Ector had a population of 737. The median age was 37.5 years; 27.5% of the residents were under 18 and 14.0% were 65 or older. For every 100 females, there were 101.4 males, and for every 100 females 18 and over, there were 95.6 males 18 and over.

None of residents lived in urban areas, while 100.0% lived in rural areas.

Of the 261 households in Ector, 35.6% had children under 18 living in them, 52.1% were married-couple households, 15.7% were households with a male householder and no spouse or partner present, and 24.5% were households with a female householder and no spouse or partner present. About 19.9% of all households were made up of individuals, and 6.5% had someone living alone who was 65 or older.

The city had 300 housing units, of which 13.0% were vacant. The homeowner vacancy rate was 3.0% and the rental vacancy rate was 8.8%.

Racial composition as of the 2020 census
Race	Number	Percentage
White	620	84.1%
Black or African American	14	1.9%
American Indian and Alaska Native	5	0.7%
Asian	5	0.7%
Native Hawaiian and other Pacific Islander	5	0.7%
Some other race	44	6.0%
Two or more races	44	6.0%
Hispanic or Latino (of any race)	68	9.2%

=== 2000 census ===
As of the 2000 census, 600 people, 238 households, and 163 families were residing in the city. The population density was 507.4 inhabitants per square mile (195.9/km^{2}). The 263 housing units averaged 222.4/sq mi (86.1/km^{2}). The racial makeup of the city was 95.33% White, 1.17% Native American, 0.50% Asian, 0.33% from other races, and 2.67% from two or more races. Hispanics or Latinos of any race were 1.50% of the population.

Of the 238 households, 35.3% had children under 18 living with them, 55.9% were married couples living together, 10.5% had a female householder with no husband present, and 31.5% were not families. About 29.0% of all households were made up of individuals, and 13.9% had someone living alone who was 65 or older. The average household size was 2.52, and the average family size was 3.13.

In the city, the age distribution was 30.3% under 18, 4.5% from 18 to 24, 29.0% from 25 to 44, 20.7% from 45 to 64, and 15.5% who were 65 or older. The median age was 35 years. For every 100 females, there were 90.5 males. For every 100 females 18 and over, there were 86.6 males.

The median income in the city for a household was $38,125 and for a family was $46,500. Males had a median income of $30,781 versus $24,063 for females. The per capita income for the city was $15,083. About 2.9% of families and 5.7% of the population were below the poverty line, including 2.8% of those under 18 and 10.0% of those 65 or over.

== Education ==
The city of Ector is served by the Ector Independent School District.

== History ==
The community started in the late 19th century when farmers settled near Caney Creek. It is named for one of the pioneer settlers of the area, Ector Owens. It was originally named Victor's Station, but was changed when residents were informed by postal authorities that a town of that name already existed. Postal service began in 1886, and it was connected to the Texas and Pacific Railway in 1892, making Ector a shipping point for area farmers. In 1904, the town had 218 residents, and infrastructure included a church, a school, and a bank. The population reached 451 in 1926, at which time there were 25 business, and the population reached 457 in 1947. Its population was reported as 650 in 1988, but the number of businesses declined over this period, from 12 in 1936 to three in 1988. By that time, most of the residents were commuting to jobs in Sherman, 20 miles (32 km) to the west, or Denison, 22 miles (35 km) to the northwest.

A $320 million resort and bunker facility called Trident Lakes was under development near Ector in 2017. James O’Connor was CEO, with former Navy SEAL Rob Kaneiss as chief security officer. By 2018, the owner of Trident Lakes Property Holdings, John Eckerd, was under investigation for money laundering, with investors calling the project a scam.
