= Fairlie, Texas =

- Unincorporated community
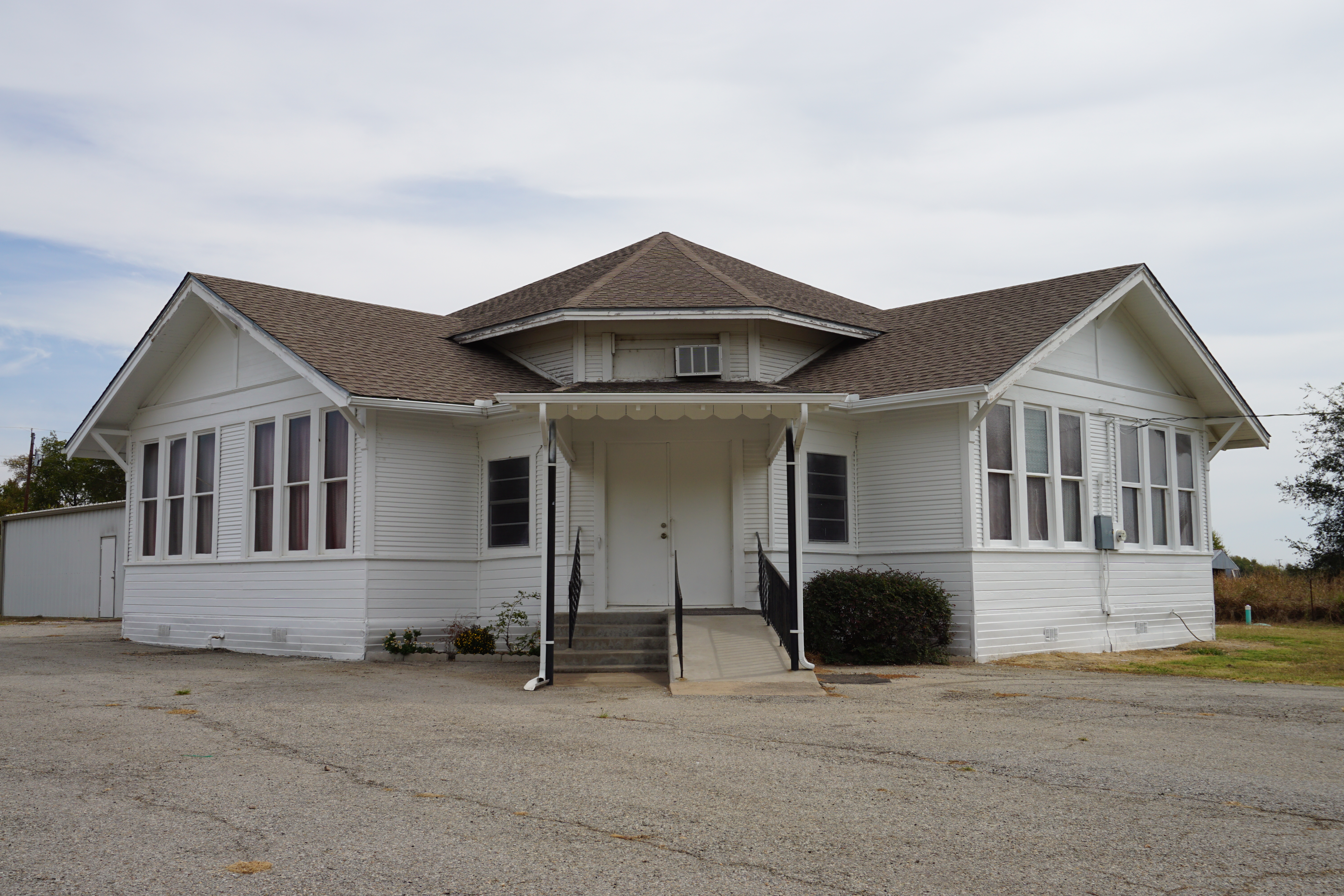
- Fairlie Baptist Church in October 2015

- Location within Texas Location within the United States
- Coordinates: 33°18′48″N 95°57′30″W
- Country: United States
- State: Texas
- County: Hunt

Population (2010)
  - Total: 80
- Time zone: UTC-6 (Central (CST))
  - Summer (DST): UTC-5 (CDT)
- ZIP code: 75428
- Area codes: 903, 430

Fairlie is an unincorporated agricultural community in northeastern Hunt County, Texas, United States. It is located on State Highway 11, approximately 11 miles from Greenville, between Commerce and Wolfe City.

== History ==
Fairlie was named after Fairlee Webster, a resident of the town. Not much is known about Fairlee or why the town was named after him/her. By 1892 Fairlie had enough residents to receive its first post office. By 1904, the population of Fairlie had reached 248. The post office shut down in the late 1980s and by the year 2000, Fairlie's population had dropped to 80.

== Facts ==
There are 3 notable roads in Fairlie, TX. Both Hwy 50 and Hwy 11 cross through Fairlie and are intersected by FM 1563, which runs east and west through old downtown. As of 2010 there are no traffic signals in Fairlie. Now Fairlie is home to the Ball Seed Clover company, located in the old railroad office.
