= Sadler, Texas =

- City
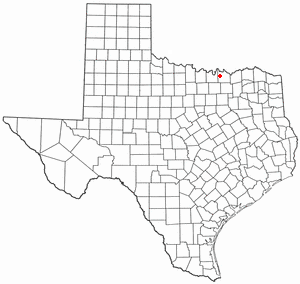
- Location of Sadler, Texas

- Coordinates: 33°40′53″N 96°50′47″W
- Country: United States
- State: Texas
- County: Grayson

Area
  - Total: 0.78 sq mi (2.02 km^{2})
  - Land: 0.78 sq mi (2.02 km^{2})
  - Water: 0 sq mi (0.00 km^{2})
- Elevation: 719 ft (219 m)

Population (2020)
  - Total: 336
  - Density: 431/sq mi (166/km^{2})
- Time zone: UTC-6 (Central (CST))
  - Summer (DST): UTC-5 (CDT)
- ZIP code: 76264
- Area codes: 903, 430
- FIPS code: 48-64088
- GNIS feature ID: 2411752

Sadler is a city in Grayson County, Texas, United States. The population was 336 at the 2020 census, down from 343 at the 2010 census. It is part of the Sherman–Denison Metropolitan Statistical Area.

== Geography ==
Sadler is located in western Grayson County. The U.S. Route 82 freeway runs through the southern part of the city, leading east 17 miles (27 km) to Sherman, the county seat, and west 5 miles (8 km) to Whitesboro.

According to the United States Census Bureau, Sadler has a total area of 0.73 square miles (1.9 km^{2}), all land.

=== Climate ===
The climate in this area is characterized by hot, humid summers and generally mild to cool winters. According to the Köppen Climate Classification system, Sadler has a humid subtropical climate, abbreviated "Cfa" on climate maps.

== Demographics ==
Historical population
Census	Pop.	Note	%±
1970	309		—
1980	329		6.5%
1990	316		−4.0%
2000	404		27.8%
2010	343		−15.1%
2020	336		−2.0%
U.S. Decennial Census; 2020 Census

=== 2020 census ===
As of the 2020 census, Sadler had a population of 336 and a median age of 40.9 years. 21.4% of residents were under the age of 18 and 15.2% of residents were 65 years of age or older. For every 100 females there were 104.9 males, and for every 100 females age 18 and over there were 98.5 males age 18 and over. As of the 2020 census, 0.0% of residents lived in urban areas, while 100.0% lived in rural areas. As of the 2020 census, there were 137 households in Sadler, of which 32.8% had children under the age of 18 living in them. Of all households, 40.9% were married-couple households, 21.2% were households with a male householder and no spouse or partner present, and 28.5% were households with a female householder and no spouse or partner present. About 22.6% of all households were made up of individuals and 8.8% had someone living alone who was 65 years of age or older. As of the 2020 census, there were 162 housing units, of which 15.4% were vacant. The homeowner vacancy rate was 5.4% and the rental vacancy rate was 0.0%.

Racial composition as of the 2020 census
Race	Number	Percent
White	274	81.5%
Black or African American	4	1.2%
American Indian and Alaska Native	5	1.5%
Asian	0	0.0%
Native Hawaiian and Other Pacific Islander	0	0.0%
Some other race	3	0.9%
Two or more races	50	14.9%
Hispanic or Latino (of any race)	20	6.0%

=== 2000 census ===
As of the 2000 census, there were 404 people, 167 households, and 112 families residing in the city. The population density was 673.4 inhabitants per square mile (260.0/km^{2}). There were 177 housing units at an average density of 295.0 per square mile (113.9/km^{2}). The racial makeup of the city was 98.76% White, 0.25% African American and 0.99% Native American. Hispanic or Latino of any race were 0.99% of the population.

There were 167 households, of which 29.3% had children under the age of 18 living with them, 54.5% were married couples living together, 8.4% had a female householder with no husband present, and 32.9% were non-families. 30.5% of all households were made up of individuals, and 15.0% had someone living alone who was 65 years of age or older. The average household size was 2.42 and the average family size was 3.04.

Of the city's population, 25.7% were under the age of 18, 7.4% aged between 18 and 24, 25.5% between 25 and 44, 26.2% between 45 and 64, and 15.1% who were 65 or older. The median age was 38. For every 100 females, there were 94.2 males. For every 100 females age 18 and over, there were 87.5 males.

The median income for a household in the city was $26,250, and the median income for a family was $29,250. Males had a median income of $30,893 versus $21,667 for females. The per capita income for the city was $15,302. About 11.9% of families and 14.7% of the population were below the poverty line, including 17.2% of those under age 18 and 7.8% of those age 65 or over.

== Education ==
Sadler is served by the S and S Consolidated Independent School District.
