= Southmayd, Texas =

- City
- Nickname: The Small Cherry
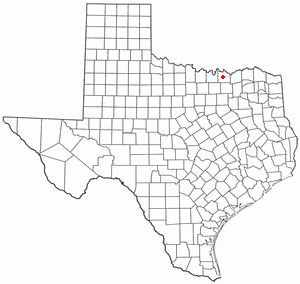
- Location of Southmayd, Texas

- Coordinates: 33°37′20″N 96°42′40″W
- Country: United States
- State: Texas
- County: Grayson

Area
  - Total: 2.80 sq mi (7.25 km^{2})
  - Land: 2.80 sq mi (7.24 km^{2})
  - Water: 0.0039 sq mi (0.01 km^{2})
- Elevation: 807 ft (246 m)

Population (2020)
  - Total: 978
  - Density: 350/sq mi (135/km^{2})
- Time zone: UTC-6 (Central (CST))
  - Summer (DST): UTC-5 (CDT)
- ZIP code: 76268
- Area codes: 903, 430
- FIPS code: 48-69104
- GNIS feature ID: 2411946
- Website: southmaydtx.com

Southmayd (the latter syllable pronounced like "maid") is a city in Grayson County, Texas, United States. The population was 978 at the 2020 census. It is part of the Sherman–Denison Metropolitan Statistical Area.

== Geography ==
Southmayd is located in central Grayson County along Texas State Highway 56. Sherman, the county seat, is 10 miles (16 km) to the east, and Whitesboro is 8 miles (13 km) to the west. Texas State Highway 289 runs north–south through the eastern part of the city.

According to the United States Census Bureau, Southmayd has a total area of 2.6 square miles (6.8 km^{2}), of which 0.004 square miles (0.01 km^{2}), or 0.15%, are water.

== Demographics ==
Historical population
Census	Pop.	Note	%±
1970	222		—
1980	318		43.2%
1990	643		102.2%
2000	992		54.3%
2010	992		0.0%
2020	978		−1.4%
U.S. Decennial Census; 2020 Census

=== 2020 census ===
As of the 2020 census, Southmayd had a population of 978, and the median age was 38.5 years. 24.8% of residents were under the age of 18 and 15.4% of residents were 65 years of age or older. For every 100 females there were 105.5 males, and for every 100 females age 18 and over there were 105.3 males age 18 and over.

0.0% of residents lived in urban areas, while 100.0% lived in rural areas.

There were 347 households in Southmayd, of which 34.0% had children under the age of 18 living in them. Of all households, 48.1% were married-couple households, 20.7% were households with a male householder and no spouse or partner present, and 22.5% were households with a female householder and no spouse or partner present. About 23.7% of all households were made up of individuals and 10.9% had someone living alone who was 65 years of age or older.

There were 396 housing units, of which 12.4% were vacant. The homeowner vacancy rate was 4.5% and the rental vacancy rate was 6.7%.

Racial composition as of the 2020 census
Race	Number	Percent
White	758	77.5%
Black or African American	13	1.3%
American Indian and Alaska Native	16	1.6%
Asian	12	1.2%
Native Hawaiian and Other Pacific Islander	0	0.0%
Some other race	100	10.2%
Two or more races	79	8.1%
Hispanic or Latino (of any race)	175	17.9%

=== 2000 census ===
As of the census of 2000, there were 992 people, 343 households, and 281 families residing in the city. The population density was 432.2 inhabitants per square mile (166.9/km^{2}). There were 371 housing units at an average density of 161.6 per square mile (62.4/km^{2}). The racial makeup of the city was 91.13% White, 1.61% African American, 3.23% Native American, 0.30% Asian, 1.41% from other races, and 2.32% from two or more races. Hispanic or Latino of any race were 2.72% of the population.

There were 343 households, out of which 41.4% had children under the age of 18 living with them, 62.1% were married couples living together, 15.2% had a female householder with no husband present, and 17.8% were non-families. 14.3% of all households were made up of individuals, and 5.0% had someone living alone who was 65 years of age or older. The average household size was 2.89 and the average family size was 3.14.

In the city, the population was spread out, with 30.2% under the age of 18, 9.0% from 18 to 24, 32.2% from 25 to 44, 22.5% from 45 to 64, and 6.1% who were 65 years of age or older. The median age was 32 years. For every 100 females, there were 95.3 males. For every 100 females age 18 and over, there were 92.8 males.

The median income for a household in the city was $44,565, and the median income for a family was $44,750. Males had a median income of $31,800 versus $21,083 for females. The per capita income for the city was $16,097. About 7.3% of families and 7.7% of the population were below the poverty line, including 7.9% of those under age 18 and 19.0% of those age 65 or over.

== Education ==
Southmayd is served by the S and S Consolidated Independent School District.
