= Texas State Highway 11 =

State highway in Texas

State Highway 11

Route information
- Maintained by TxDOT
- Length: 153.2 mi (246.6 km)
- Existed: April 4, 1917–present

Major junctions
- West end: SH 56 in Sherman
- US 69 in Whitewright; I-30 in Sulpher Springs; US 271 in Pittsburg; US 259 in Daingerfield
- East end: Future I-369 / US 59 in Linden

Location
- Country: United States
- State: Texas
- Counties: Grayson, Fannin, Hunt, Hopkins, Franklin, Wood, Camp, Titus, Morris, Cass

Highway system
- Highways in Texas; Interstate; US; State; Former; Toll; Loops; Spurs; FM/RM; Park; Rec
← RE 10	→ Loop 11

State Highway 11 (SH 11) is a highway that runs from US 59 (Future I-369) in Linden to SH 56 in Sherman in northeast Texas.

== Route description ==
SH 11 begins at an intersection with State Highway 56 on the easternedge of Sherman, just north of the Sherman Regional Airport. The route then travels to the southeast through Northeast Texas. In 2009, it was rerouted around the city of Commerce, concurrent with State Highway 24 and State Loop 178, with the old routing through Commerce transferred to a business route. It continues southeast toward Sulphur Springs, where it shares a concurrency with State Highway 154 and the old routing of US 67, and intersects I-30 on the south side of town. After Sulphur Springs, the route takes a more easterly direction through Northeast Texas, before reaching its eastern terminus at US 59 (Future I-369) on the eastern edge of Linden.

== History ==
Historic SH 11

State Highway 11 was one of the original twenty-five state highways proposed on June 21, 1917, overlaid on top of the Jefferson Highway. In 1917, the routing was proposed from the Oklahoma state line at Denison, south on present day U.S. Highway 69 through Whitewright into Greenville. From Greenville, it went east on U.S. Highway 67 to Mount Pleasant, and south on U.S. Highway 271 to Gilmer and along State Highway 300 to Longview, and finally, U.S. Highway 80 through Marshall to the Louisiana state line.

On June 17, 1918, the segment from Gilmer to Longview had yet to be built, so the road was rerouted over the current US 271 and US 80 routes through Gladewater, Texas.

On August 21, 1923, SH 11 had lost most of its original assignment. The section north of Greenville was transferred to SH 42, the section south to Gladewater was renumbered as SH 65, and the section east of there was transferred to SH 15. SH 11 was rerouted southeast via current SH 11 to Daingerfield, replacing part of SH 1A, then north on current U.S. Highway 259 to Omaha. On March 16, 1927, SH 11 was rerouted via the current SH 11 to end at Commerce. The section from Greenville to Sulphur Springs became a rerouting of SH 1. On March 19, 1929, SH 11 extended north to DeKalb. On February 8, 1933, it was extended to begin in Ladonia via the present day State Highway 50. On July 15, 1935, the extension from Commerce to Ladonia was cancelled (as it was not built yet). On November 24, 1936, this extension was restored.

On September 26, 1939 the US 259 segment of SH 11 was cancelled and was transferred to SH 26, and SH 11 was extended from Daingerfield to Linden via its current alignment, replacing SH 47, and up US 59 to a terminus in Texarkana. The US 59 alignment of SH 11 was removed on October 13, 1947 and was transferred to US 59, The Ladonia-Commerce segment was removed as it became part of SH 50, and SH 11 was rerouted on its current assignment on December 17, 1970 over FM 1281 and part of FM 697.

== Major intersections ==
County	Location	mi	km	Destinations	Notes
Grayson	Sherman	0.0	0.0	SH 56 (East Lamar Street)	
Grayson	Sherman	1.6	2.6	FM 697 east / East Ida Road	
Grayson		2.6	4.2	FM 1417 north	
Grayson	Tom Bean	10.9	17.5	FM 902 west / FM 2729 south (South Britton Street) – Cannon, Howe	West end of FM 2729 concurrency
Grayson	Tom Bean	11.0	17.7	FM 2729 north (North Lyon Street) – White Rock	East end of FM 2729 concurrency
Grayson	Whitewright	16.2	26.1	US 69 north / SH 160 south – Bells, Denison	West end of US 69 concurrency
Grayson	Whitewright	16.6	26.7	FM 898 east – Downtown Whitewright	
Grayson		17.3	27.8	US 69 south – Greenville	East end of US 69 concurrency
Fannin		18.2	29.3	FM 151 – Whitewright, Orangeville	
Fannin		23.6	38.0	FM 3297 north	
Fannin		24.8	39.9	SH 121 – Bonham, Trenton	Interchange
Fannin	Randolph	25.1	40.4	Bus. SH 121 south	Western end of Bus. SH 121 concurrency
Fannin	Randolph	25.2	40.6	Bus. SH 121 north	Eastern end of Bus. SH 121 concurrency
Fannin		27.4	44.1	FM 2815 north	
Fannin		28.7	46.2	FM 1553	
Fannin	Bailey	31.8	51.2	SH 78 – Bonham, Leonard	
Hunt	Wolfe City	38.8	62.4	SH 34 – Honey Grove, Greenville	
Hunt	Wolfe City	39.1	62.9	FM 1563 west	West end of FM 1563 concurrency
Hunt	Wolfe City	39.2	63.1	FM 1563 east	East end of FM 1563 concurrency
Hunt		45.8	73.7	To FM 1563 / County Road 4700	
Hunt	Fairlie	46.6	75.0	FM 2655 south / FM 1563 east	
Hunt	Commerce	51.2	82.4	SH 24 north / Bus. SH 11 east – Commerce, Cooper, Paris	Interchange; west end of SH 24 concurrency
Hunt	Commerce	51.9	83.5	SH 224	
Hunt	Commerce	52.3	84.2	Bus. SH 224 (Live Oak Street)	
Hunt	Commerce	53.0	85.3	SH 24 south / Loop 178 west (Culver Street) – Campbell	East end of SH 24 concurrency; west end of Loop 178 concurrency
Hunt	Commerce	54.3	87.4	FM 3218 south	
Hunt	Commerce	54.5	87.7	Bus. SH 11 west / Loop 178 ends – Commerce	East end of Loop 178 concurrency
Hopkins		57.3	92.2	FM 275 south – Cumby	
Hopkins		57.8	93.0	FM 3134 north – Emblem	
Hopkins	Ridgeway	62.41	100.44	FM 2653 south – Brashear	West end of FM 2653 concurrency
Hopkins	Ridgeway	62.42	100.46	FM 2653 north – Cooper State Park South Sulphur Unit	East end of FM 2653 concurrency
Hopkins	Sulphur Springs	71.1	114.4	SH 19 north / Houston Street – Sulphur Springs, Paris, Southwest Dairy Museum	West end of SH 19 concurrency
Hopkins	Sulphur Springs	71.8	115.6	Bus. US 67 – Sulphur Springs	
Hopkins	Sulphur Springs	72.5– 72.8	116.7– 117.2	I-30 (US 67) – Texarkana, Dallas	I-30 exit 122
Hopkins	Sulphur Springs	73.3	118.0	SH 19 south – Emory, Canton	East end of SH 19 concurrency
Hopkins	Sulphur Springs	74.8	120.4	FM 2297 – Arbala	
Hopkins	Sulphur Springs	75.8	122.0	SH 154 – Quitman, Commerce, Cooper	
Hopkins		78.2	125.9	FM 2560 south – Reilly Springs	
Hopkins		81.1	130.5	FM 1870 north – Thermo	
Hopkins		81.8	131.6	FM 1567 west – Reilly Springs	
Hopkins	Como	84.0	135.2	FM 69 north – Dike	West end of FM 69 concurrency
Hopkins	Como	84.3	135.7	FM 69 south – Coke	East end of FM 69 concurrency
Hopkins	Pickton	89.2	143.6	FM 269 south	West end of FM 269 concurrency
Hopkins	Pickton	89.4	143.9	FM 269 north – Pine Forest, Weaver	East end of FM 269 concurrency
Hopkins		94.9	152.7	FM 3019 north – Greenwood	
Franklin	No major junctions				
Wood	Winnsboro	96.6	155.5	FM 852 west	West end of FM 852 concurrency
Wood	Winnsboro	97.0	156.1	SH 37 – Mount Vernon, Quitman	
Wood	Winnsboro	97.2	156.4	FM 312 south / FM 852 east (South Walnut Street)	East end of FM 852 concurrency
Wood	Winnsboro	97.3	156.6	FM 1448 east	
Wood		99.5	160.1	FM 515 west – Coke	
Wood				FM 115 north – Scroggins	
Wood				FM 1647 south – Perryville	
Camp	Leesburg			FM 1519 west	West end of FM 1519 concurrency
Camp	Leesburg			FM 1519 east	East end of FM 1519 concurrency
Camp				FM 21 north – Mount Vernon, Bob Sandlin State Park	
Camp				FM 1521 north – Rocky Mound	
Camp				Loop 179 east (David H. Abernathy Boulevard) – truck route to US 271	
Camp	Pittsburg			FM 1520 north	
Camp	Pittsburg			Loop 238 (Mount Pleasant Street / Rusk Street)	
Camp	Pittsburg			FM 993 south (Lafayette Street)	
Camp	Pittsburg			FM 557 east (Jefferson Street)	
Camp	Pittsburg			US 271 (Greer Boulevard / truck route) – Mount Pleasant, Gilmer	
Titus				FM 2348 north – Union Hill	
Titus				FM 1735 north – Northeast Texas Community College	
Morris	Cason			FM 144 south – Lone Star	West end of FM 144 concurrency
Morris	Cason			FM 144 north – Omaha	East end of FM 144 concurrency
Morris	Daingerfield			US 259 north / SH 49 west (Broadnax Street) – Business District, Omaha, Mount Pleasant	West end of US 259 / SH 49 concurrency
Morris	Daingerfield			US 259 south (Linda Drive) – Lone Star, Longview	East end of US 259 concurrency
Morris				PR 17 – Daingerfield State Park	
Cass	Hughes Springs			FM 161 / FM 250 south (Taylor Street / Hanes Boulevard) – Naples, Lone Star	West end of FM 250 concurrency
Cass	Hughes Springs			FM 250 north (Keasler)	East end of FM 250 concurrency
Cass	Hughes Springs			SH 49 east / FM 2612 west – Jefferson, Lone Star	East end of SH 49 concurrency
Cass				FM 130 west – Carterville	
Cass	Linden			SH 8 – New Boston	
Cass	Linden			FM 125 (Main Street)	
Cass	Linden			US 59 (Future I-369) – Atlanta, Jefferson	
1.000 mi = 1.609 km; 1.000 km = 0.621 mi: Concurrency terminus

== Business routes ==
SH 11 has one business route.

Business State Highway 11-H is a business loop that runs through Commerce. The road was bypassed in 2009 by SH 11.

== See also ==
- List of state highways in Texas
- List of highways numbered 11
