= Harold Joe Waldrum =

American painter (1934 - 2003)

- Born: August 23, 1934; Savoy, Texas
- Died: December 13, 2003 (aged 69); New Mexico
- Resting place: Columbus, New Mexico
- Education: Western State College; Fort Hays State College
- Known for: Painting

Harold Joe Waldrum (August 23, 1934 – December 13, 2003) was an American artist whose abstract works depict color studies especially of the old adobe churches of Northern New Mexico. He also used a Polaroid SX-70 camera to photograph many of the churches, initially as part of the process in creating his paintings. However, this collection of thousands of photographs became a body of work in and of itself and was exhibited at several galleries and museums.

Before pursuing an artistic career, Waldrum graduated from Western State College and became a public school teacher in Kansas, where he taught music and art for a decade-and-a-half. After receiving a graduate degree from Fort Hays State College in 1970, he became a full-time painter, moving to New Mexico, the focal point of much of his work.

In the later part of his career, Waldrum endeavored to preserve the historic churches that were the inspiration for his paintings. In 1985, he founded an organization to promote this goal and produced a series of documentaries about the deterioration and ultimately demolition of the churches. In the 1980s and 90s, he collaborated with a few printmakers to create a collection of aquatint etchings and linocuts in a style very similar to his paintings.

Waldrum died on December 13, 2003, and he is buried in Columbus, New Mexico, a village near the Mexico–United States border. His works are held in the collections of the Museum of New Mexico, the Palm Springs Art Museum, the Albuquerque Museum, and the Harwood Foundation of Taos, New Mexico.

== Biography ==
=== Early life ===
Waldrum was born on August 23, 1934, in Savoy, Texas. He attended the Western State College, graduating from the Colorado school with a music degree. He then began working as a music and art teacher in the public schools around Kansas. He remained a teacher for about 14 or 16 years.

Waldrum continued his education at Fort Hays State College. He graduated summa cum laude with a master's degree in studio art in 1970. Waldrum remained at the school for an additional year, as a teacher and head of the graduate art program.

=== Career ===
Waldrum first began painting in the later part of the 1950s. It was not until 1971 that he decided to abandon his teaching career and dedicate himself to his painting. To do so, he first moved to Tesuque, New Mexico. However, he did not remain in one place for too long and often moved to different places in New Mexico. It was here that he began working on a decade-long series of paintings that gave the audience a narrow vantage point of his subject matter, the adobe buildings of the American Southwest. The "window series" explored the tripartite form to make "studies of color, weight and value."

In 1975, Waldrum briefly established a home studio in the Penitente village of Gusano, near Pecos and south of San Ysidro del Norte in San Miguel County. However, the following year, he had to flee to Texas and then even to Mexico, fearing for his life. On May 27, 1976, he had become involved in a dispute with several young men in the village, one of whom he had shot and killed. According to Waldrum, he had killed the man in self-defense. The next night, Waldrum's home and studio were burned down; he lost much of his artwork and all of his belongings.

Soon after this incident, Waldrum moved to New York, returning only in the summer months to paint in New Mexico. He did not permanently move back to the state until 1979, when he took up residence in Taos, New Mexico, and worked in the same building that once served as the former studio for Joseph Henry Sharp, part of the Couse/Sharp Historic Site. During this time, his subject matter became more focused on the many adobe churches and Penitente moradas in the New Mexico. He began using a Polaroid SX-70 to capture angles and light conditions, but soon the photographs became artworks in their own right; throughout his life, he would capture nearly 9,000 Polaroid photographs, many of which are held at the photographic archives of the New Mexico History Museum at the Palace of Governors.

In 1985, Waldrum established the El Valle Foundation and began an effort to help preserve the buildings that were the focal point of many of his paintings. In partnership with Jim Heese, he also produced a videotape, documenting the failed efforts to preserve the church located in El Valle. The videotape culminates in the demolition of the building after significant deterioration due to lack of proper maintenance. They also created a series of videos documenting other churches, in Las Trampas and Picuris Pueblo, which were aired in local television channels. According to art historian Mary Anne Redding, Waldrum had “campaigned tirelessly to let people know how significant these structures were and why it was important to preserve them, not just as spiritual centers for isolated communities, but also to maintain the history and culture of Spanish New Mexico.” His efforts were not all in vain; they did succeed in preserving a few of the churches in part due to their efforts. Waldrum and Heese also produced videos showing artists at work, including Waldrum, Larry Bell, Alyce Frank, and Melissa Zink. In the 1980s, he also engaged printmaker Robert Blanchard of Albuquerque for assistance in creating a series of aquatint etchings and linocuts based on his abstract depictions of southwestern architecture.

=== Later years and legacy ===
In 1989, Waldrum moved farther south, to a ranch in the mountains between Albuquerque and Socorro, New Mexico, where he lived until 1997. In 1994, he published an autobiography entitled Ando en Cueros (I Walk Stark Naked), perhaps a reference to his propensity for working in the nude. He also raised mules and lived in relative seclusion until the painter Delmas Howe persuaded him to move again in 1996.

Waldrum moved to Truth or Consequences, New Mexico, and established the Rio Bravo Fine Art Gallery in 1997. He first worked in a building on Main Street but then, according to Waldrum, he traded several of his prints and paintings to purchase a building, which was a former Ace Hardware store. The building served not only as an exhibition space for Rio Bravo but also as his personal studio. His gallery continues in operation today, showing artists of the region.

Waldrum lived in Truth or Consequences until his death on December 13, 2003. Before his death, he often traveled to Albuquerque to work with the printmaker Michael Costello, as Blanchard had retired. Waldrum was buried in a cemetery near the Mexico–United States border in Columbus, New Mexico.

In 2011, the New Mexico History Museum and the Albuquerque Museum held simultaneous exhibits, titled "A Passionate Light", which showcased over a thousand of Waldrum's Polaroid photographs. Many of the "monoprints", as he referred to them, entered the New Mexico History Museum collection by way of a donation from the Waldrum Estate and the Rio Bravo Fine Art Gallery. A collection of Waldrum's prints and paintings can also be found at Palm Springs Art Museum in Palm Springs, California and the University of New Mexico's Harwood Museum of Art in Taos. A group exhibition of his work along with those of artists Dan Namingha and Rufino Tamayo are being exhibited until October 3, 2017, at Museum Barberini in Potsdam, Germany.

== Publications ==
- Waldrum, Harold Joe; Tally Richards Gallery (1982). Tally Richards Gallery Presents: The First Exhibition of the Churches, July 11–August 1, 1982. Taos, NM: Tally Richards Gallery. OCLC 13635103.
- Waldrum, Harold Joe; Peterson, William; Gerald Peters Gallery (1985). The Gerald Peters Gallery Presents: The Churches of Northern New Mexico, October 6–26, 1985. Santa Fe, NM: Gerald Peters Gallery. ISBN 9780935037005. OCLC 13821692.
- Waldrum, Harold Joe (1994). Ando en Cueros (I Walk Stark Naked). Bosque, NM: Chinaberry Press. ISBN 9780964199101. OCLC 34947216.
- Waldrum, Harold Joe (1996). H. Joe Waldrum at Chef du Jour: the SX-70 monoprints. Albuquerque, NM: Chef du Jour. OCLC 666038584.
