= Pottsboro Independent School District =

School district in Texas, United States

Address
- 207 Cardinal Lane Pottsboro, TX, USA ESC Region 10
- Coordinates: 33°45′40″N 96°39′53″W

District information
- Type: Independent School District
- Motto: Exceptional by Choice
- Grades: PK-12
- Established: 1902; 124 years ago
- Superintendent: Rick DeMasters
- Governing agency: Texas Education Agency
- Schools: 3
- NCES District ID: 4835580

Students and staff
- Students: 1,365 (2025-26)
- Athletic conference: UIL Class AAA
- District mascot: Cardinals
- Colors: Red & White

Other information
- Website: www.pottsboroisd.org

Pottsboro Independent School District (Pottsboro ISD, PISD) is a public school district based in Pottsboro, Texas, United States. Covering 97 square miles in north central Grayson County, the district serves the City of Pottsboro and surrounding areas, as well as a portion of Denison.

As of 2026, Pottsboro ISD operates three campuses, including one high school, one middle school, and one elementary school. The district most recently received an A rating from the Texas Education Agency (TEA).

== Schools ==
- Pottsboro Elementary (Grades PK-3)
- Pottsboro Intermediate (Grades 4-5)
- Pottsboro Middle (Grades 6-8)
- Pottsboro High (Grades 9-12)
