= Theodore Wright (disambiguation) =

Ted or Theodore Wright may refer to:

- Ted Wright, American football player for the Boston Redskins and Brooklyn Dodgers
- Ted Wright, pseudonym of James Brown used for the writing credits of his single Out of Sight
- Ted A. Wright (1901–1974), American football, basketball, and track coach
- Theodore Wright (1883–1914), British soldier and recipient of the Victoria Cross.
- Theodore Paul Wright (1895–1970), American aeronautical engineer
- Theodore S. Wright (1797–1847), African-American abolitionist
