= Grayson College =

Community college in Grayson County, Texas, U.S.

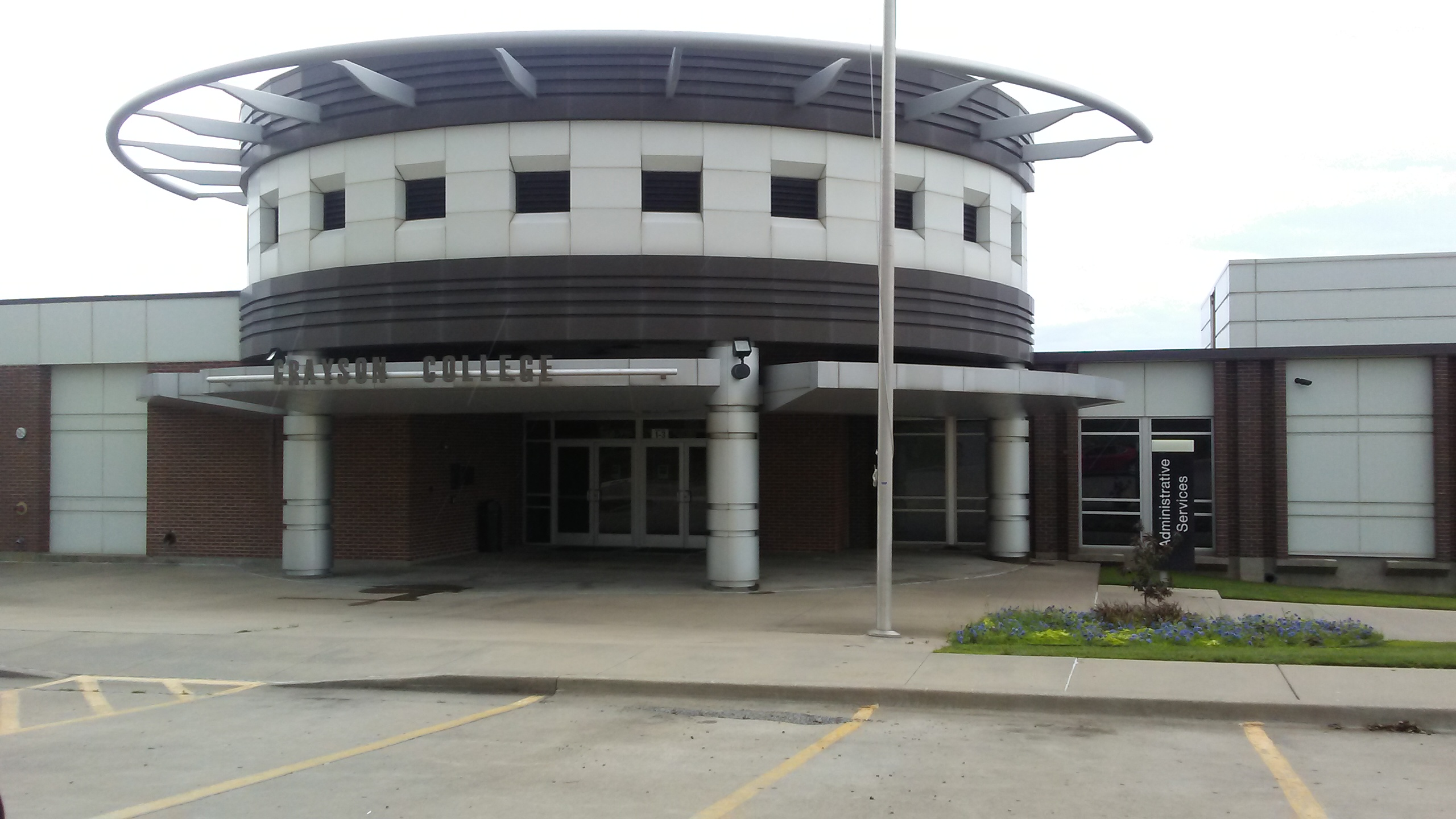
- The Administration Building at the main campus in Denison
- Former name: Grayson County College (1965–2012)
- Type: Public community college
- Established: 1965
- President: J. P. McMillen
- Administrative staff: 270
- Students: 5,000+
- Location: Denison, Texas, United States; 33.706106°N 96.634438°W
- Campus: Rural
- Colors: Blue & white
- Nickname: Vikings
- Sporting affiliations: NJCAA – NTJCAC (Baseball, Softball, Basketball)
- Website: grayson.edu

Grayson College is a public community college in Grayson County, Texas. The main campus is in Denison and it has branch campuses in Denison (west extension, at the site of the old Perrin Air Force Base) and Van Alstyne (south campus).

== History ==
In February 2007, Grayson's board of trustees called for a $44,790,000 bond election to expand and improve the existing campus, which was held in May and the referendum passed. This was Grayson's first bond election since the one called to create the campus in the 1960s. Among other things, $25.7 million was devoted to a new career and technical center on the east campus, moving these facilities from their current west campus location.

== Campus ==
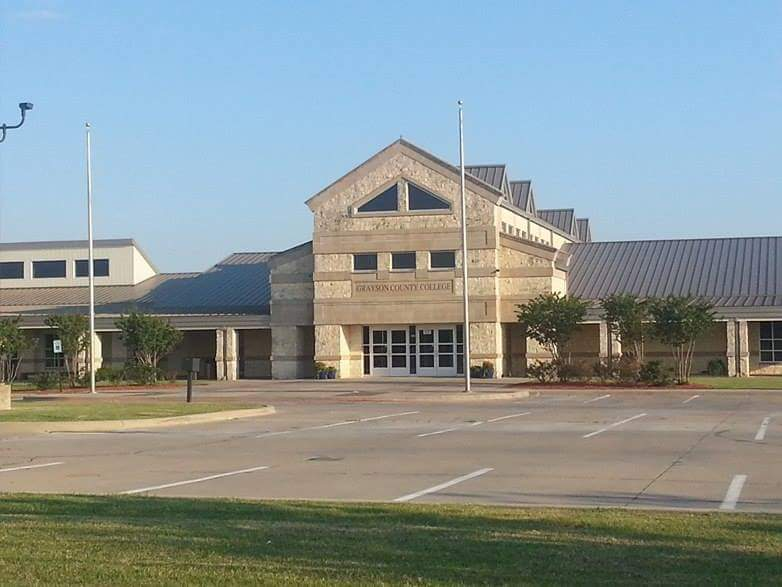
Grayson College's south campus in Van Alstyne

The main campus is located in Denison, with a branch campus in Van Alstyne. The main campus (consisting of the east campus and the west extension) is in a rural setting near North Texas Regional Airport. The east campus is all new construction and houses the administration; the west extension is composed mainly of buildings left over by the former Perrin Air Force Base, including and vineyards which carry on the work of famed horticulturalist and Denison resident Thomas Volney Munson (previously, an 18-hole golf course existed on the campus, but was closed as of 2017).

== Organization and administration ==
The college president is J.P. McMillen.

As defined by the Texas Legislature, the official service area of Grayson includes all of Grayson County and territory within the following school districts in Fannin County: Bonham, Dodd City, Ector, Leonard, Sam Rayburn, Savoy, Trenton, Whitewright and Wolfe City.

== Academics ==
Grayson offers associate degrees in over 25 areas of study, and operates in partnership with West Texas A&M University to offer selected bachelor's degrees online, with student counseling provided by GC.

One of Grayson's unique offerings is in viticulture and enology, housed on the west campus which also houses the work of Denison resident T.V. Munson, whose work in viticulture saved France's wine industry during the Great French Wine Blight.

== Athletics ==
The college athletics teams are nicknamed the Vikings. Grayson competes in the North Texas Junior College Athletic Conference of the NJCAA, and offers athletic scholarships in baseball and softball.

== Notable people ==
- Andy LaRoche, third baseman with the Sugar Land Skeeters.
- John Lackey, former pitcher for the Chicago Cubs.
- Steven Okert, baseball pitcher
