= Pottsboro, Texas =

- Town
- Motto: "Come Play. Come Stay."
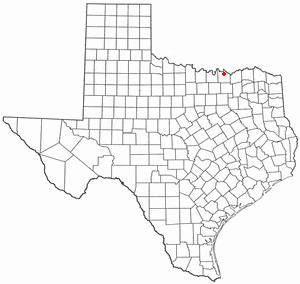
- Location of Pottsboro, Texas

- Coordinates: 33°46′15″N 96°40′17″W
- Country: United States
- State: Texas
- County: Grayson

Area
  - Total: 3.30 sq mi (8.54 km^{2})
  - Land: 3.30 sq mi (8.54 km^{2})
  - Water: 0 sq mi (0.00 km^{2})
- Elevation: 735 ft (224 m)

Population (2020)
  - Total: 2,488
  - Density: 755/sq mi (291/km^{2})
- Time zone: UTC-6 (Central (CST))
  - Summer (DST): UTC-5 (CDT)
- ZIP code: 75076
- Area codes: 903, 430
- FIPS code: 48-59132
- GNIS feature ID: 2412503
- Website: cityofpottsboro.com

Pottsboro is a town in Grayson County, Texas, United States. Its population was 2,488 at the 2020 census, up from 2,160 at the 2010 census. It is part of the Sherman–Denison metropolitan statistical area.

== Geography ==
Pottsboro is located in northern Grayson County. Texas State Highway 289 passes through the western side of the town, leading south 10 miles (16 km) to Southmayd and north 10 miles to a dead end at Preston on Lake Texoma. Denison is 8 miles (13 km) east of Pottsboro via Farm to Market Road 120, and Sherman, the county seat, is 12 miles (19 km) to the southeast.

According to the United States Census Bureau, Pottsboro has a total area of 2.9 square miles (7.4 km^{2}), all land.

== History ==
Judge James G. Thompson and Mr. James Archer Potts both owned large ranches at the future site of Pottsboro, before its inception.

Pottsboro was established in 1876 by James A. Potts, a pioneer settler who donated land for a town and a right-of-way so the Missouri–Kansas–Texas Railroad would extend its tracks westward from Denison to his settlement. The community, no doubt aided by its status as a stop on the railroad, grew rapidly for the rest of the 1800s. It incorporated in 1880 with the name "Pottsborough", and by 1885, its population had reached 200 and it supported a cotton gin, several gristmills, and a number of churches. Pottsboro suffered devastating fires that destroyed a great deal of the business section of the town: 1890, 1902, 1923, and 1924. Father-in-law of J.A. Potts, Judge James G. Thompson, applied for a post office in 1891, when they responded, the "ugh" was dropped from the name by the federal government, and the town's name finally became "Pottsboro". A post office opened there in 1891.

The population reached 454 in 1920 and 500 in 1925. By that time, the community was served by some 25 businesses, including a bank, and by two schools with a combined enrollment of 300 students. Pottsboro declined to a population of 358 by 1936 and 312 by the mid-1940s. It then grew to 383 by 1957. The number of businesses had fallen to 12 by 1948, though by the late 1950s, it was back up to more than 20. The town began to grow again during the 1950s, perhaps spurred by the rapid expansion of nearby Denison. By 1967, Pottsboro reported 30 businesses and a population of 750, and by 1990, its population was 1,177. The population grew to 1,579 in 2000.

== Demographics ==
Historical population
Census	Pop.	Note	%±
1890	286		—
1900	400		39.9%
1910	313		−21.7%
1920	454		45.0%
1930	358		−21.1%
1940	342		−4.5%
1950	383		12.0%
1960	640		67.1%
1970	748		16.9%
1980	895		19.7%
1990	1,177		31.5%
2000	1,579		34.2%
2010	2,160		36.8%
2020	2,488		15.2%
U.S. Decennial Census

Pottsboro racial composition as of 2020 (NH = Non-Hispanic) (Note: Note: the US Census treats Hispanic/Latino as an ethnic category. This table excludes Latinos from the racial categories and assigns them to a separate category. Hispanics/Latinos can be of any race.)
Race	Number	Percentage
White (NH)	2,059	82.76%
Black or African American (NH)	18	0.72%
Native American or Alaska Native (NH)	56	2.25%
Asian (NH)	19	0.76%
Pacific Islander (NH)	1	0.04%
Some Other Race (NH)	7	0.28%
Mixed/Multi-Racial (NH)	155	6.23%
Hispanic or Latino	173	6.95%
Total	2,488	

As of the 2020 United States census, there were 2,488 people, 902 households, and 598 families residing in the town.

== Climate ==
Pottsboro is part of a humid subtropical climate region.

== Education ==
The town is served by the Pottsboro Independent School District.
