= Savoy, Texas =

- City
- Nickname: The Small Grape
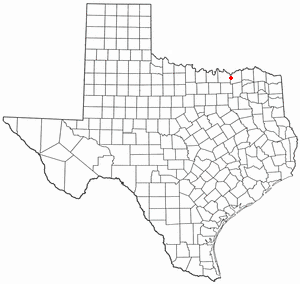
- Location of Savoy, Texas

- Coordinates: 33°35′58″N 96°22′15″W
- Country: United States
- State: Texas
- County: Fannin

Area
  - Total: 0.80 sq mi (2.06 km^{2})
  - Land: 0.80 sq mi (2.06 km^{2})
  - Water: 0 sq mi (0.00 km^{2})
- Elevation: 673 ft (205 m)

Population (2020)
  - Total: 712
  - Density: 895/sq mi (346/km^{2})
- Time zone: UTC-6 (Central (CST))
  - Summer (DST): UTC-5 (CDT)
- ZIP code: 75479
- Area codes: 903, 430
- FIPS code: 48-66008
- GNIS feature ID: 2411835
- Website: cityofsavoy.org

Savoy is a city in Fannin County, Texas, United States. The population is 712 as of the 2020 census.

== Geography ==
Savoy is located in western Fannin County. Its western border is the Grayson County line. Texas State Highway 56 passes through the city, leading east 11 miles (18 km) to Bonham, the Fannin County seat, and west 2.5 miles (4.0 km) to Bells. U.S. Route 82 passes 1 mile (1.6 km) north of Savoy, leading east to Bonham and west 16 miles (26 km) to Sherman.

According to the United States Census Bureau, Savoy has a total area of 0.77 square miles (2.0 km^{2}), all land.

== Demographics ==
Historical population
Census	Pop.	Note	%±
1880	348		—
1890	344		−1.1%
1900	343		−0.3%
1910	328		−4.4%
1920	378		15.2%
1930	284		−24.9%
1940	298		4.9%
1950	314		5.4%
1960	493		57.0%
1970	756		53.3%
1980	855		13.1%
1990	877		2.6%
2000	850		−3.1%
2010	831		−2.2%
2020	712		−14.3%
U.S. Decennial Census

=== 2020 census ===
As of the 2020 census, there were 712 people and 231 families residing in Savoy. The median age was 41.5 years; 22.9% of residents were under the age of 18 and 20.2% of residents were 65 years of age or older. For every 100 females there were 80.7 males, and for every 100 females age 18 and over there were 74.3 males.

0.0% of residents lived in urban areas, while 100.0% lived in rural areas.

There were 301 households in Savoy, of which 33.9% had children under the age of 18 living in them. Of all households, 45.2% were married-couple households, 12.6% were households with a male householder and no spouse or partner present, and 36.2% were households with a female householder and no spouse or partner present. About 27.9% of all households were made up of individuals and 16.0% had someone living alone who was 65 years of age or older.

There were 334 housing units, of which 9.9% were vacant. The homeowner vacancy rate was 2.7% and the rental vacancy rate was 8.2%.

Racial composition as of the 2020 census
Race	Number	Percent
White	629	88.3%
Black or African American	6	0.8%
American Indian and Alaska Native	8	1.1%
Asian	3	0.4%
Native Hawaiian and Other Pacific Islander	0	0.0%
Some other race	4	0.6%
Two or more races	62	8.7%
Hispanic or Latino (of any race)	36	5.1%

=== 2000 census ===
As of the census of 2000, there were 850 people, 305 households, and 214 families residing in the city. The population density was 1,176.0 inhabitants per square mile (454.1/km^{2}). There were 350 housing units at an average density of 484.2 per square mile (187.0/km^{2}). The racial makeup of the city was 94.94% White, 0.47% African American, 0.71% Native American, 0.35% Asian, 1.53% from other races, and 2.00% from two or more races. Hispanic or Latino of any race were 2.59% of the population.

There were 305 households, out of which 33.4% had children under the age of 18 living with them, 58.0% were married couples living together, 10.5% had a female householder with no husband present, and 29.8% were non-families. 26.2% of all households were made up of individuals, and 12.5% had someone living alone who was 65 years of age or older. The average household size was 2.47 and the average family size was 3.00.

In the city, the population was spread out, with 23.6% under the age of 18, 6.6% from 18 to 24, 23.8% from 25 to 44, 21.3% from 45 to 64, and 24.7% who were 65 years of age or older. The median age was 42 years. For every 100 females, there were 86.0 males. For every 100 females aged 18 and over, there were 77.8 males.

The median income for a household in the city was $37,679, and the median income for a family was $41,641. Males had a median income of $31,528 versus $22,188 for females. The per capita income for the city was $16,448. About 4.3% of families and 8.6% of the population were below the poverty line, including 6.9% of those under age 18 and 12.5% of those age 65 or over.

== Education ==
Savoy is served by the Savoy Independent School District.

== Notable people ==
- Harold Joe Waldrum, artist
- Ted Wright, NFL player
