= Current Issues and Events (UIL) =

Academic contest for Texas, US schools

Current Issues and Events (commonly known as Current Events) is one of several academic events sanctioned by the University Interscholastic League. The contest began in the 1990-1991 academic year under Bobby Hawthorne, and has been conducted every academic year since then except for the 2019-2020 academic year, when the contest, among other spring UIL events, was cancelled because of the onset of the COVID-19 pandemic in Texas. Beginning in 2025, the current state director is Andrew Bates, who has served as the UIL Social Studies contest director since 2016.

Current Events is designed to test students' knowledge and understanding of significant events which have taken place during the current academic year.

== Eligibility ==
Students in Grade 9 through Grade 12 are eligible to enter this event. All grades compete in the same division based on UIL classification.

The test covers current events which have taken place during the academic year. For testing purposes, the following test ranges are implemented.

- Invitational A: August 1 - December 1
- Invitational B: September 1 - January 1
- District: October 1 – March 1
- Region: November 1 – April 1
- State: January 1 – May 1

Each school may send up to six students for the district meet, but only four students for the region and state meets. However, in districts with more than eight schools the district executive committee can limit participation to three students per school. In order for a school to participate in team competition, the school must send at least three students.

== Rules and Scoring ==
The test consists of two parts: a multiple choice section and an essay section. Students are given one hour to complete both sections. The multiple choice section consists of 40 questions. The questions may be answered in any order and there is no penalty for skipping questions. The essay section follows, which may include a quote or two and a prompt. The contestant must write an informative essay explaining the issue while addressing any questions or angles from the prompt. Students who do not attempt the essay section are immediately disqualified. No time warning is given during the test; at the end of 60 minutes contestants must cease writing.

The multiple choice section is scored first. Contestants are given two points for each question answered correctly, as no points are deducted for incorrect answers. After the multiple choice section is scored, the top eight students will have their essays scored. However, more essays may be judged (typically no more than 10) depending on how many multiple-choice ties exist among the top eight multiple choice scores. The essays are judged based on a holistic grading criteria of 20 points by three judges. The multiple choice section and the essay section make up a student's individual score. For the team competition, the top three individual multiple choice scores from a school are added together.

The maximum individual score is 100 points and the maximum team score is 240 points. Prior to the 2023-2024 school year, the maximum individual score was 50 points: 40 for the multiple-choice section and 10 for the essay section.

== Determining the Winner ==
The top three individuals and the top team will advance to the next round. In addition, within each region, the highest-scoring second place team from all district competitions advances as the "wild card" to regional competition (provided the team has four members). Within the state, the highest-scoring second place team from all regional competitions advances as the wild card to the state competition. Members of advancing teams who did not place individually remain eligible to compete for individual awards at higher levels.

For individual competition, the essay scores of the tied contestants are judged against each other to break the tie in a "natural tiebreaker." If a tie persists, meaning two contestants received identical multiple choice and essay scores, then both essays will be evaluated against each other to break the tie. Individuals who place first through third advance to the next round of competition, while those who place fourth through sixth are considered alternates.

For team competition, the multiple-choice score of the fourth-place individual is used as the tiebreaker. If the multiple-choice scores of the fourth-place individuals are identical, then their essays will be evaluated against each other to break the tie. If a team has only three members it is not eligible to participate in the tiebreaker. If the fourth-place score still results in a tie, the individual tiebreaker rules will not apply, and all remaining tied teams will advance.

For district, regional, and state meet academic championship and meet sweepstakes awards, points are awarded to the school as follows:

- Individual places: 1st—15, 2nd—12, 3rd—10, 4th—8, 5th—6, and 6th—4.
- Team places: 1st—10 and 2nd—5.
- The maximum number of points a school can earn in Current Issues and Events is 47.

The first and second place team at each level of competition receives individual medals and a team award, often a plaque or trophy. At state, the coach for the individual state champion and team state champion for each conference receives a gold UIL coaches pin. At the state level, though no points are awarded, the third-place team is still draped with medals and a plaque just like the second and first place teams.

== List of Prior Winners ==
=== Individual ===
NOTE: For privacy reasons, only the winning school is shown.

| School Year | Class 1A | Class 2A | Class 3A | Class 4A | Class 5A | Class 6A (2015–present) |
|---|---|---|---|---|---|---|
| 1990-1991 | 1. Menard 2. Menard 3. San Isidro | 1. Coleman 2. Scurry Scurry-Rosser 3. Abernathy | 1. Rice Consolidated 2. Queen City 3. La Grange | 1. Kerrville Tivy 2. Burkburnett 3. Beeville Jones | 1. Brownsville Pace 2. Round Rock 3. Houston Lee | N/A |
| 1991-1992 | 1. San Isidro 2. Menard 3. Lindsay | 1. Dublin 2. Johnson City 3. Redwater | 1. Crane 2. Lorena 3. Early | 1. Jacksonville 2. Burkburnett 3. Santa Fe | 1. Brownsville Pace 2. Fort Worth Dunbar 3. Pasadena: Dobie | N/A |
| 1992-1993 | 1. Menard 2. San Isidro 3. Apple Springs | 1. McGregor 2. Wimberley 3. Centerville | 1. Texarkana Pleasant Grove 2. Elgin 3. Elgin | 1. Longview Pine Tree 2. Jacksonville 3. Port Neches-Groves | 1. Grand Prairie 2. Round Rock 3. Fort Worth Dunbar | N/A |
| 1993-1994 | 1. Meadow 2. Lindsay 3. Valentine | 1. Sadler S&S Consolidated 2. Centerville 3. Sadler S&S Consolidated | 1. Gladewater Sabine 2. Port Isabel 3. La Grange | 1. Beeville Jones 2. College Station: A&M Consolidated 3. McKinney | 1. Grand Prairie 2. Fort Worth Dunbar 3. Bryan | N/A |
| 1994-1995 | 1. Byers 2. Lindsay 3. Apple Springs | 1. Sadler S&S Consolidated 2. Dublin 3. Centerview | 1. Rusk 2. La Grange 3. Wimberley | 1. Friendswood 2. Port Lavaca Calhoun 3. Mesquite Poteet | 1. Fort Worth Dunbar 2. Atlanta 3. Fort Worth Dunbar | N/A |
| 1995-1996 | 1. Yantis 2. Cherokee 3. Utopia | 1. Sadler S&S Consolidated 2. Woodsboro 3. Sadler S&S Consolidated | 1. Teague 2. Teague 3. Austin Lake Travis | 1. Friendswood 2. Los Fresnos 3. McKinney | 1. Round Rock 2. Laredo Alexander 3. Austin Johnston | N/A |
| 1996-1997 | 1. Utopia 2. San Perita 3. Apple Springs | 1. Sadler S&S Consolidated 2. Sadler S&S Consolidated 3. Sadler S&S Consolidated | 1. Teague 2. Teague 3. La Grange | 1. Friendswood 2. Mesquite Poteet 3. West Mesquite | 1. Austin Johnston 2. Denton Ryan 3. Alief Hastings | N/A |
| 1997-1998 | 1. Chillicothe 2. Knippa 3. Booker | 1. Valley View 2. Universal City Randolph 3. Gainesville Callisburg | 1. Teague 2. Wimberley 3. Teague | 1. Austin Johnson 2. Los Fresnos 3. Friendswood | 1. Katy Taylor 2. Klein 3. Fort Worth Dunbar | N/A |
| 1998-1999 | 1. Chillicothe 2. Follett 3. Menard | 1. Jourdanton 2. Sundown 3. Sundown | 1. Atlanta 2. Atlanta 3. Teague | 1. Fort Worth Dunbar 2. Paris 3. Los Fresnos | 1. Round Rock 2. Katy Taylor 3. Houston Clear Lake | N/A |
| 1999-2000 | 1. Crosbyton 2. Harper 3. Menard | 1. Sadler S&S Consolidated 2. Clyde Eula 3. Sadler S&S Consolidated | 1. Vernon 2. Dalhart 3. Atlanta | 1. Corpus Christi Flour Bluff 2. Fort Worth Western Hills 3. Corpus Christi Flour Bluff | 1. Katy Taylor 2. Sugar Land Elkins 3. Edinburg North | N/A |
| 2000-2001 | 1. Lindsay 2. Menard 3. Lindsay | 1. Celina 2. Comfort 3. Clifton | 1. Cotulla 2. Abilene Wylie 3. Atlanta | 1. Sulphur Springs 2. Southlake Carroll 3. Corpus Christi Flour Bluff | 1. College Station A&M Consolidated 2. Alief Elsik 3. Pflugerville | N/A |
| 2001-2002 | 1. Lindsay 2. Follett 3. Lindsay | 1. Stamford 2. Clyde Eula 3. Sadler S&S Consolidated | 1. Atlanta 2. Jourdanton 3. Atlanta | 1. Southlake Carroll 2. Sulphur Springs 3. Corpus Christi Flour Bluff | 1. Pflugerville 2. Round Rock 3. College Station A&M Consolidated | N/A |
| 2002-2003 | 1. San Isidro 2. Follett 3. Moulton | 1. Sadler S&S Consolidated 2. Coahoma 3. San Angelo Grape Creek | 1. Forney 2. Abilene Wylie 3. Jourdanton | 1. Corpus Christi Flour Bluff 2. Sulphur Springs 3. Fredericksburg | 1. College Station A&M Consolidated 2. Round Rock 3. Fort Bend Elkins | N/A |
| 2003-2004 | 1. Martin's Mill 2. Martin's Mill 3. Hedley | 1. Schulenburg 2. Canadian 3. Nacogdoches Central | 1. Jourdanton 2. Abilene Wylie 3. Atlanta | 1. Castroville Medina Valley 2. Friendswood 3. El Paso | 1. Corpus Christi Ray 2. Alief Elsik 3. Houston Hastings | N/A |
| 2004-2005 | 1. Apple Springs 2. Valley View 3. Borden Gail | 1. Gainesville Callisburg 2. Sadler S&S Consolidated 3. Jourdanton | 1. Abilene Wylie 2. Wimberley 3. Abilene Wylie | 1. El Paso 2. Castroville Medina Valley 3. Frisco | 1. Corpus Christi Ray 2. College Station A&M Consolidated 3. Houston Hastings | N/A |
| 2005-2006 | 1. Hedley 2. Samnorwood 3. Latexo | 1. Sadler S&S Consolidated 2. Tuscola Jim Ned 3. Holliday | 1. Mont Belvieu Barbers Hill 2. Canton 3. Abilene Wylie | 1. El Paso 2. San Antonio Alamo Heights 3. Stephenville | 1. College Station A&M Consolidated 2. Round Rock 3. Round Rock | N/A |
| 2006-2007 | 1. Martin's Mill 2. Lindsay 3. Apple Springs | 1. Tuscola Jim Ned 2. Tuscola Jim Ned 3. Sadler S&S Consolidated | 1. Wimberley 2. Abilene Wylie 3. Monanhans | 1. Stephenville 2. Mont Belvieu Barbers Hill 3. Pflugerville Henderickson | 1. Round Rock 2. El Paso Franklin 3. Conroe Oak Ridge | N/A |
| 2007-2008 | 1. Muenster 2. Apple Springs 3. Pineland West Sabine | 1. Sadler S&S Consolidated 2. Tuscola Jim Ned 3. Sadler S&S Consolidated | 1. Wimberley 2. Abilene Wylie 3. Eustace | 1. Pflugerville Hendrickson 2. Aledo 3. Stephenville | 1. Houston Clear Lake. 2. Katy Taylor 3. Plano Sr. | N/A |
| 2008-2009 | 1. Latexo 2. Apple Springs 3. Nazareth | 1. Tuscola Jim Ned 2. Holliday 3. Tuscola Jim Ned | 1. Hidalgo 2. Wimberley 3. Van | 1. Houston Kerr 2. Frisco Wakeland 3. Aledo | 1. Katy Taylor 2. Spring Klein Collins 3. Katy Cinco Ranch | N/A |
| 2009-2010 | 1. Apple Springs 2. Lovelady 3. Iraan | 1. Holliday 2. Jim Ned Tuscola 3. Sadler S&S Consolidated | 1. Hidalgo 2. Bellville 3. Longview Spring View | 1. San Antonio Alamo Heights 2. Denton 3. Aledo | 1. Sugar Land Dulles 2. Cypress Woods 3. Katy Seven Lakes | N/A |
| 2010-2011 | 1. Latexo 2. Martin's Mill 3. Farwell | 1. Vanderbilt Industrial 2. Tuscola Jim Ned 3. Tuscola Jim Ned | 1. Wimberley 2. Lucas Lovejoy 3. La Grange | 1. San Antonio Alamo Heights 2. Aledo 3. Joshua | 1. Katy Seven Lakes 2. Austin Westwood 3. Mercedes Science Academy | N/A |
| 2011-2012 | 1. Sabine Pass 2. Clyde Eula 3. Farwell | 1. Tolar 2. Holliday 3. Holliday | 1. Van 2. Fredericksburg 3. Pampa | 1. Ennis 2. Aledo 3. Frisco Centennial | 1. Plano 2. Mansfield 3. Katy Seven Lakes | N/A |
| 2012-2013 | 1. Jayton 2. Sabine Pass 3. Farwell | 1. Sadler S&S Consolidated 2. Holliday 3. Holliday | 1. La Grange 2. La Grange 3. Tyler Chapel Hill | 1. Ennis 2. Pearland Dawson 3. Lubbock | 1. Grapevine 2. Houston Kerr 3. Austin Westwood | N/A |
| 2013-2014 | 1. Latexo 2. Jayton 3. Latexo | 1. Holliday 2. Holliday 3. Sadler S&S Consolidated | 1. Hudson 2. Orangefeild 3. Glen Rose | 1. The Colony 2. Hereford 3. Lubbock | 1. Grapevine 2. Sugar Land Clements 3. Kleins | N/A |
| 2014-2015 | 1. Hartley 2. Lometa 3. Channing | 1. Sabine Pass 2. Latexo 3. Sabine Pass | 1. Sadler S&S Consolidated 2. Coleman 3. Fort Worth Harmony School of Innovation | 1. Wimberley 2. Canton 3. Burnet | 1. Hereford 2. Richland Hills Birdview 3. Marble Falls | 1. Katy Taylor 2. Dallas Highland Park 3. Allen |
| 2015-2016 | 1. Waco Gholson 2. Henrietta 3. Gail Borden | 1. Sabine Pass 2. Era 3. Latexo | 1. Anahuac 2. Taft 3. Grandview | 1. Salado 2. Dalhart 3. Mabank | 1. Mansfield Lake Ridge 2. Boerne Champion 3. Boerne Champion | 1. Allen 2. Houston Carnegie Vanguard 3. Irving MacArthur |
| 2016-2017 | 1. Fort Davis 2. Tioga 3. Fayetteville | 1. Era 2. Weimar 3. Mason | 1. Grandview 2. Goliad 3. Universal City Randolph | 1. Dalhart 2. Princeton 3. Orange Little Cypress-Mauriceville | 1. Amarillo Randall 2. Mission Sharyland Pioneer 3. College Station A&M Consolidated | 1. Austin Lake Travis 2. Plano Sr. 3. Katy Tompkins |
| 2017-2018 | 1. Gail Borden 2. Tioga 3. Moulton | 1. Latexo 2. Sabine Pass 3. Era | 1. Holliday 2. Quitman 3. Lyford | 1. Stephenville 2. Orange Little Cypress-Mauriceville 3. China Spring | 1. Boerne Champion 2. Fort Worth Northwest Eaton 3. College Station A&M Consolidated | 1. Plano West Sr. 2. Houston Mayde Creek 3. Katy Seven Lakes |
| 2018-2019 | 1. Gail Borden 2. Comstock 3. Moulton | 1. Sabine Pass 2. Sabine Pass 3. Latexo | 1. Holliday 2. Corpus Christi London 3. Van Vleck | 1. Argyle 2. Decatur 3. China Spring | 1. College Station 2. College Station A&M Consolidated 3. Jacksonville | 1. Humble Atascocita 2. The Woodlands 3. Katy Seven Lakes |
| 2019-2020 | Event canceled | Event canceled | Event canceled | Event canceled | Event canceled | Event canceled |
| 2020- 2021 | 1. Fruitvale 2. Knippa 3. Gordon | 1. Mason 2. Stamford 3. Era | 1. Infinity ECHS 2. London 3. Holiday | 1. Hereford 2. Wimberley 3. La Grange | 1. Montgomery Lake Creek 2. Wakeland 3. Wakeland | 1. Health Careers 2. Lake Ridge 3. Plano East |
| 2021- 2022 | 1. UT Tyler University Academy Tyler 2. UT Tyler University Academy Tyler 3. Lasara | 1. Mason 2. Era 3. Brackett | 1. London 2. Jim Ned 3. Jim Ned | 1. Wimberley 2. La Grange 3. Burnet | 1. Cedar Park 2. Ennis 3. Waller | 1. Allen 2. Dulles 3. Mansfield |
| 2022-2023 | 1. Gail Borden County 2. Gail Borden County 3. Comstock | 1. Mason 2. Muenster 3. Gladewater Union Grove | 1. Mansfield Frontier 2. Ingram Moore 3. Leonard | 1. Burnet 2. Dallas Talented & Gifted 3. Dallas Talented & Gifted | 1. Buda Hays 2. Leander Rouse 3. College Station | 1. Conroe The Woodlands 2. Cy-Fair 3. Mansfield |
| 2023-2024 | 1. Vernon Northside 2. Gustine 3. Gail Borden County | 1. Era 2. Crawford 3. Mason | 1. Mansfield Frontier 2. Leonard 3. GC Collegiate Acad TCC NE | 1. Hereford 2. Hereford 3. Wimberly | 1. Nacogdoches 2. Argyle 3. Joshua | 1. Mansfield 2. McKinney 3. Waller |
| 2024-2025 | 1. Lasara 2. Vernon Northside 3. Gustine | 1. Hico 2. Gladewater Union Grove 3. Sabine Pass | 1. Leonard 2. Brady 3. Brady | 1. Hereford 2. Burnet 3. Burnet | 1. Leander Rouse 2. Leander Rouse 3. Leander Rouse | 1. Fort Bend Clements 2. Mansfield 3. San Antonio Johnson |
| 2025-2026 | 1. Lasara 2. Vernon Northside 3. Gail Borden County | 1. Hico 2. Crawford 3. Mason | 1. CC Collegiate 2. New Caney Infinity ECHS 3. Leonard | 1. Burnet 2. Sulphur Springs 3. Burnet | 1. Aledo 2. Aledo 3. Leander Rouse | 1. Fort Bend Clements 2. Pearland Dawson 3. Alief Kerr |

=== Team ===
INDEX: 1. State Gold Medalist Team Team

| School Year | Class 1A | Class 2A | Class 3A | Class 4A | Class 5A | Class 6A (2015–present) |
|---|---|---|---|---|---|---|
| 1990-1991 | 1. Menard | 1. Coleman | 1. La Grange | 1. Burkburnett | 1. Round Rock | N/A |
| 1991-1992 | 1. Lindsay | 1. Woodsboro | 1. Dalhart | 1. Dallas Highland Park | 1. Brownsville Pace | N/A |
| 1992-1993 | 1. Menard | 1. Wimberley | 1. Elgin | 1. Jacksonville | 1. Round Rock | N/A |
| 1993-1994 | 1. Lindsay | 1. Sadler S&S Consolidated | 1. White Oak | 1. McKinney | 1. Bryan | N/A |
| 1994-1995 | 1. (tie) Apple Springs/Lindsay | 1. Sadler S&S Consolidated | 1. (tie) Wimberley/La Grange | 1. Friendswood | 1. Fort Worth Dunbar | N/A |
| 1995-1996 | 1. Lindsay | 1. Sadler S&S Consolidated | 1. Teague | 1. Friendswood | 1. Laredo Alexander | N/A |
| 1996-1997 | 1. (tie) Apple Springs/Texline | 1. Sadler S&S Consolidated | 1. Teague | 1. Friendswood | 1. Edinburg North | N/A |
| 1997-1998 | 1. Rotan | 1. Sadler S&S Consolidated | 1. Teague | 1. Friendswood | 1. Sugar Land Elkins | N/A |
| 1998-1999 | 1. Menard | 1. Sadler S&S Consolidated | 1. Atlanta | 1. Fort Worth Dunbar | 1. Round Rock | N/A |
| 1999-2000 | 1. Crosbyton | 1. Sadler S&S Consolidated | 1. Teague | 1. Corpus Christi Flour Bluff | 1. College Station A&M Consolidated | N/A |
| 2000-2001 | 1. Lindsay | 1. Sadler S&S Consolidated | 1. Abilene Wylie | 1. Corpus Christi Flour Bluff | 1. Edinburg Economedes | N/A |
| 2001-2002 | 1. Lindsay | 1. Sadler S&S Consolidated | 1. Atlanta | 1. Sulphur Springs | 1. College Station A&M Consolidated | N/A |
| 2002-2003 | 1. Lindsay | 1. Sadler S&S Consolidated | 1. Jourdanton | 1. Corpus Christi Flour Bluff | 1. College Station A&M Consolidated | N/A |
| 2003-2004 | 1. Martin's Mill | 1. Sadler S&S Consolidated | 1. Jourdanton | 1. Castroville Medina Valley | 1. Austin Westlake | N/A |
| 2004-2005 | 1. Apple Springs | 1. Sadler S&S Consolidated | 1. Abilene Wylie | 1. Castroville Medina Valley | 1. College Station A&M Consolidated | N/A |
| 2005-2006 | 1. Apple Springs | 1. Sadler S&S Consolidated | 1. Abilene Wylie | 1. Stephenville | 1. Round Rock | N/A |
| 2006-2007 | 1. Martin's Mill | 1. Sadler S&S Consolidated | 1. Abilene Wylie | 1. Mont Belvieu Barbers Hill | 1. Round Rock | N/A |
| 2007-2008 | 1. Apple Springs | 1. Sadler S&S Consolidated | 1. Abilene Wylie | 1. Pflugerville Hendrickson | 1. Houston Clear Lake | N/A |
| 2008-2009 | 1. Apple Springs | 1. Jim Ned Tuscola | 1. Hidalgo | 1. Aledo | 1. Katy Taylor | N/A |
| 2009-2010 | 1. Latexo | 1. Sadler S&S Consolidated | 1. Hidalgo | 1. Aledo | 1. Katy Seven Lakes | N/A |
| 2010-2011 | 1. Latexo | 1. Tuscola Jim Ned | 1. Van | 1. San Antonio Alamo Heights | 1. Katy Seven Lakes | N/A |
| 2012-2013 | 1. Sabine Pass | 1. Sadler S&S Consolidated | 1. La Grange | 1. Austin Vandegrift | 1. College Station A&M Consolidated | N/A |
| 2013-2014 | 1. Latexo | 1. Sadler S&S Consolidated | 1. Orangefield | 1. Friendswood | 1. College Station A&M Consolidated | N/A |
| 2014-2015 | 1. Comstock | 1. Sabine Pass | 1. ( tie ) Fort Worth Harmony School of Innovation/ Sadler S&S Consolidated | 1. Wimberley | 1. College Station A&M Consolidated | 1. MacArthur |
| 2015-2016 | 1. (tie) Gail Borden/Comstock | 1. Latexo | 1. Brady | 1. Salado | 1. (tie) College Station A&M Consolidated/Boerne Champion | 1. Irving MacAuthur |
| 2016-2017 | 1. Tioga | 1. Mason | 1. Goliad | 1. Orange Little Cypress-Mauriceville | 1. College Station A&M Consolidated | 1. Irving MacAuthur |
| 2017-2018 | 1. Gail Borden | 1. Sabine Pass | 1. Holliday | 1. Burnet | 1. Boerne Champion | 1. San Antonio Johnson |
| 2018-2019 | 1. Gail Borden | 1. Sabine Pass | 1. Holliday | 1. Wimberley | 1. College Station A&M Consolidated | 1. Katy Seven Lakes |
| 2019-2020 | Event canceled | Event canceled | Event canceled | Event canceled | Event canceled | Event canceled |
| 2020- 2021 | 1. Fruitvale | 1. Mason | 1. Holiday | 1. (tie) Hereford/Wimberley | 1. Wakeland | 1. Cypress Woods |
| 2021- 2022 | 1. UT Tyler University Academy Tyler | 1. Era | 1. Jim Ned | 1. Burnet | 1. Waller | 1. Mansfield |
| 2022-2023 | 1. Gail Borden County | 1. Mason | 1. Mansfield Frontier | 1. Burnet | 1. Leander Rouse | 1. Cy-Fair |
| 2023-2024 | 1. Knippa | 1. Sabine Pass | 1. Leonard | 1. Hereford | 1. Argyle | 1. San Antonio Johnson |
| 2024-2025 | 1. Lometa | 1. Sabine Pass | 1. Brady | 1. Burnet | 1. Leander Rouse | 1. Fort Bend Clements |
| 2025-2026 | 1. Lometa | 1. Sabine Pass | 1. Brady | 1. Burnet | 1. Aledo | 1. Alief Kerr |
