= Caddo National Grassland =

Protected area in Fannin County, Texas

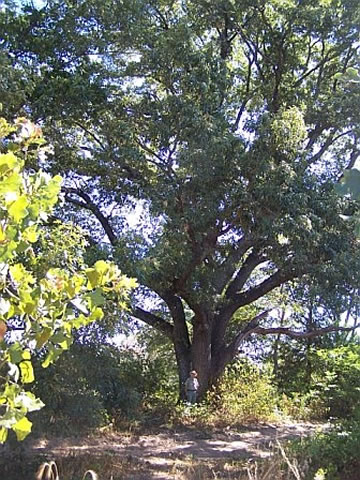
- The largest red oak in Caddo National Grassland

- Location within Texas
- Location: Fannin County, Texas, United States
- Nearest city: Honey Grove, Texas (Bois d'Arc Unit); Ladonia, Texas (Ladonia Unit)
- Coordinates: 33.7323°N 95.958°W
- Area: 17,873 acres (72.33 km^{2})
- Governing body: U.S. Forest Service
- Website: Caddo-LBJ National Grasslands

Caddo National Grassland is a national grassland in the southern Great Plains, consisting of two separate sections located in northeastern and southeastern Fannin County, Texas, United States. It is a 17,873-acre (7,233 ha) protected area that was purchased in the 1930s. The goal of the park when purchased was to restore the eroded soil. Two developed recreation areas are around Lake Davy Crockett, which is 388 acres (157 ha) in size. The grassland is divided into two units: Bois d'Arc Creek and Ladonia.

The grassland is administered together with all four United States national forests and two national grasslands located entirely in Texas, from common offices in Lufkin, Texas. The units include Angelina, Davy Crockett, Sabine, and Sam Houston National Forests, plus Caddo and Lyndon B. Johnson National Grassland. The local ranger district offices are located in Decatur.
