= North Texas Regional Airport =

Airport in Grayson County, Texas, United States

North Texas Regional Airport Perrin Field
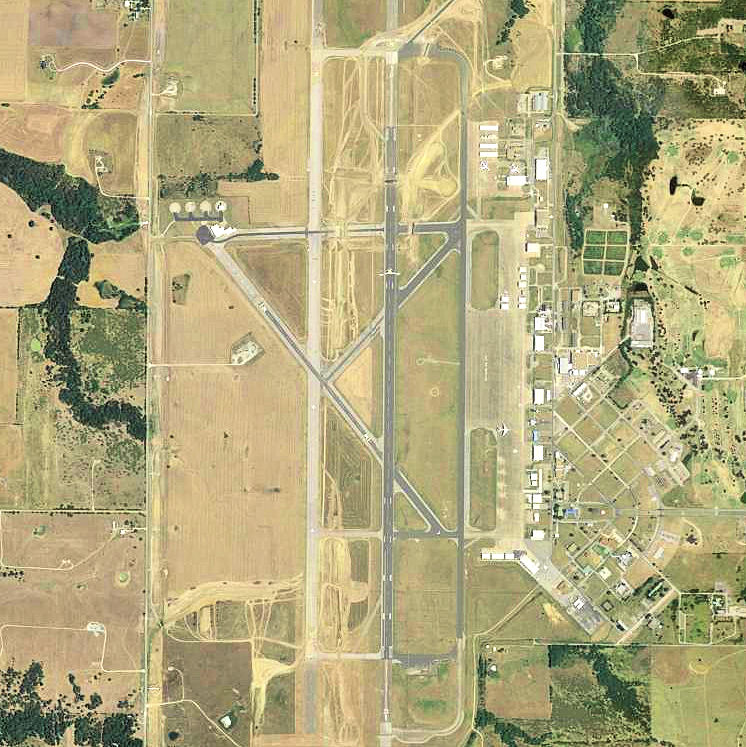
- USGS 1999 orthophoto
- IATA: PNX; ICAO: KGYI; FAA LID: GYI

Summary
- Airport type: Public
- Owner: Grayson County, Texas
- Serves: Sherman / Denison
- Elevation AMSL: 749 ft (228 m)
- Coordinates: 33°42′51″N 096°40′25″W

Map
- Location in Texas

Runways
Direction	Length		Surface
Direction	ft	m	Surface
13/31	2,277	694	Asphalt
17L/35R	9,000	2,743	Asphalt
17R/35L	4,008	1,222	Asphalt

Statistics (2007)
- Aircraft operations: 53,300
- Based aircraft: 169
- Source: FAA and airport website

North Texas Regional Airport / Perrin Field (IATA: PNX, ICAO: KGYI, FAA LID: GYI) is a county-owned airport in Grayson County, Texas between Sherman and Denison. Formerly Grayson County Airport, the airport was renamed in November 2007. Several buildings are occupied by businesses, Grayson County government agencies, and Grayson County College.

Although most U.S. airports use the same three-letter location identifier for the FAA and IATA, North Texas Regional Airport is assigned GYI by the FAA and PNX by the IATA (which assigned GYI to Gisenyi Airport in Gisenyi, Rwanda).

The airport entrance is at the intersection of Farm to Market Road 691 and Farm to Market Road 1417 on the east side, while the northern extension of State Highway 289 passes the airport on the west side.

== History ==
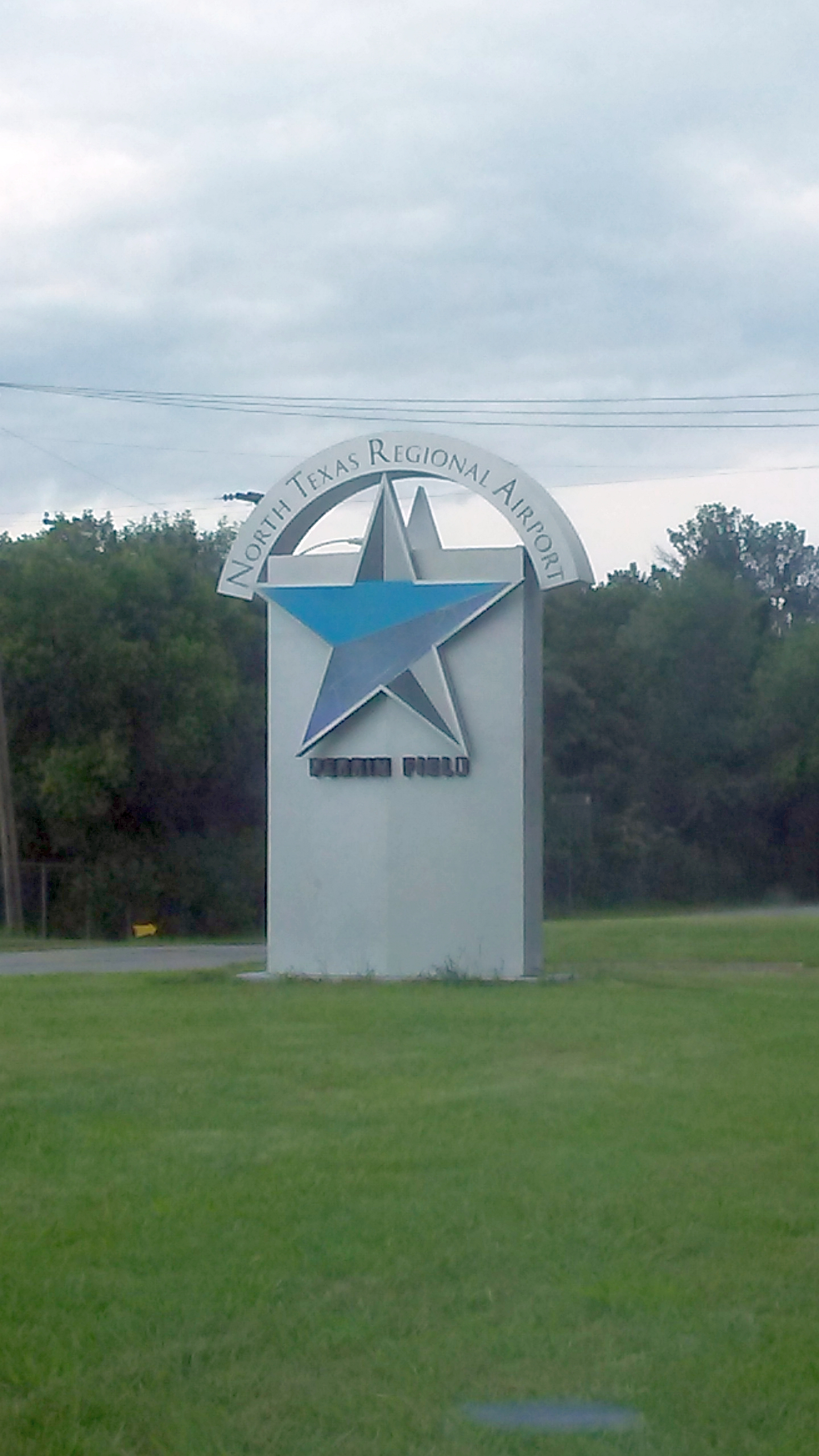
Front entrance sign at the North Texas Regional Airport

The airport is on the site of Perrin Air Force Base, which was built in 1941 and closed in 1971. Since the closure, a group of local citizens has held the memory of Perrin together, hosting nine Perrin Field reunions since the early 1980s. The Perrin AFB Research Foundation was established in 1998. Today, in addition to serving as a general-aviation airport, several businesses, as well as a juvenile detention center/boot camp and adult probation center are built upon former barracks and nearby areas. The Perrin Air Force Base Historical Museum is located at the airport and Grayson County College uses several buildings. The college also operates the former base golf course.

After seeing the fighters take off from here as a young man, aviation expert Chesley Sullenberger (best known as the pilot of US Airways Flight 1549) became interested in flying.

On 1 January 2024, the Cavanaugh Flight Museum lost its lease at Addison Airport, closed indefinitely, and announced that its aircraft would be moved to North Texas Regional, but the museum would not state whether the collection would return to public display.

== Facilities ==
The airport covers 1,410 acres (570 ha) at an elevation of 749 feet (228 m). It has three runways: 17L/35R, which measures 9,000 by 150 feet (2,743 x 46 m) and is made from asphalt/concrete; 17R/35L, which measures 4,008 by 100 feet (1,222 x 30 m) and is also made from asphalt/concrete, and 13/31, which measures 2,277 by 60 feet (694 x 18 m) and is made from asphalt.

The airport has a Category I instrument landing system (ILS) to Runway 17L. The former USAF control tower resumed operations in mid-2008.

In the year ending April 30, 2007, the airport had 53,300 aircraft operations, an average of 146 per day; 98% were general aviation, 2% were military, and <1% were air taxi. Of the 169 aircraft then based at the airport, 73% were single-engined, 11% were multi-engined, 11% were jet-engined, 4% were helicopters, and 1% were ultralight.

== See also ==
- List of airports in Texas
