= Savoy Independent School District =

School district in Texas

Coordinates: 33°36′3.5″N 96°22′9.5″W

Location
- Savoy, Texas; United States

District information
- Type: Public
- Superintendent: Samuel Talley

Students and staff
- Athletic conference: UIL Class A
- District mascot: Cardinals
- Colors: maroon/white

Other information
- Website: www.savoyisd.org

Savoy Independent School District is a public school district based in Savoy, Texas (USA).

In 2010, the school had approximately 320 students. The high school has been district UIL champions 2005, 2006, 2007, 2008, 2009, 2010, 2011, 2012, 2013, 2014, 2015, and 2016. UIL State champions in programming team and individual in 2006.

== Academic achievement ==
In 2010, the school district was rated "Exemplary" by the Texas Education Agency.

== Special programs ==
=== Athletics ===
Savoy High School plays six-man football.

== See also ==
- List of school districts in Texas
