= Ector Independent School District =

Public school district in Ector, Texas

Coordinates: 33.5750°N 96.2731°W

Location
- Ector, Texas; United States

District information
- Type: Public
- Superintendent: Jennifer Morris

Students and staff
- Athletic conference: UIL Class A
- District mascot: Eagles
- Colors: Blue & White

Other information
- Website: www.ectorisd.net

Ector Independent School District is a public school district based in Ector, Texas, United States.

In 2009, the school district was rated "recognized" by the Texas Education Agency.

== Schools ==
- Ector Junior High/High School (Grades 7-12)
- Ector Elementary School (Grades K-6)
- Ector Pre-School
