= Sherman, Texas =

- City
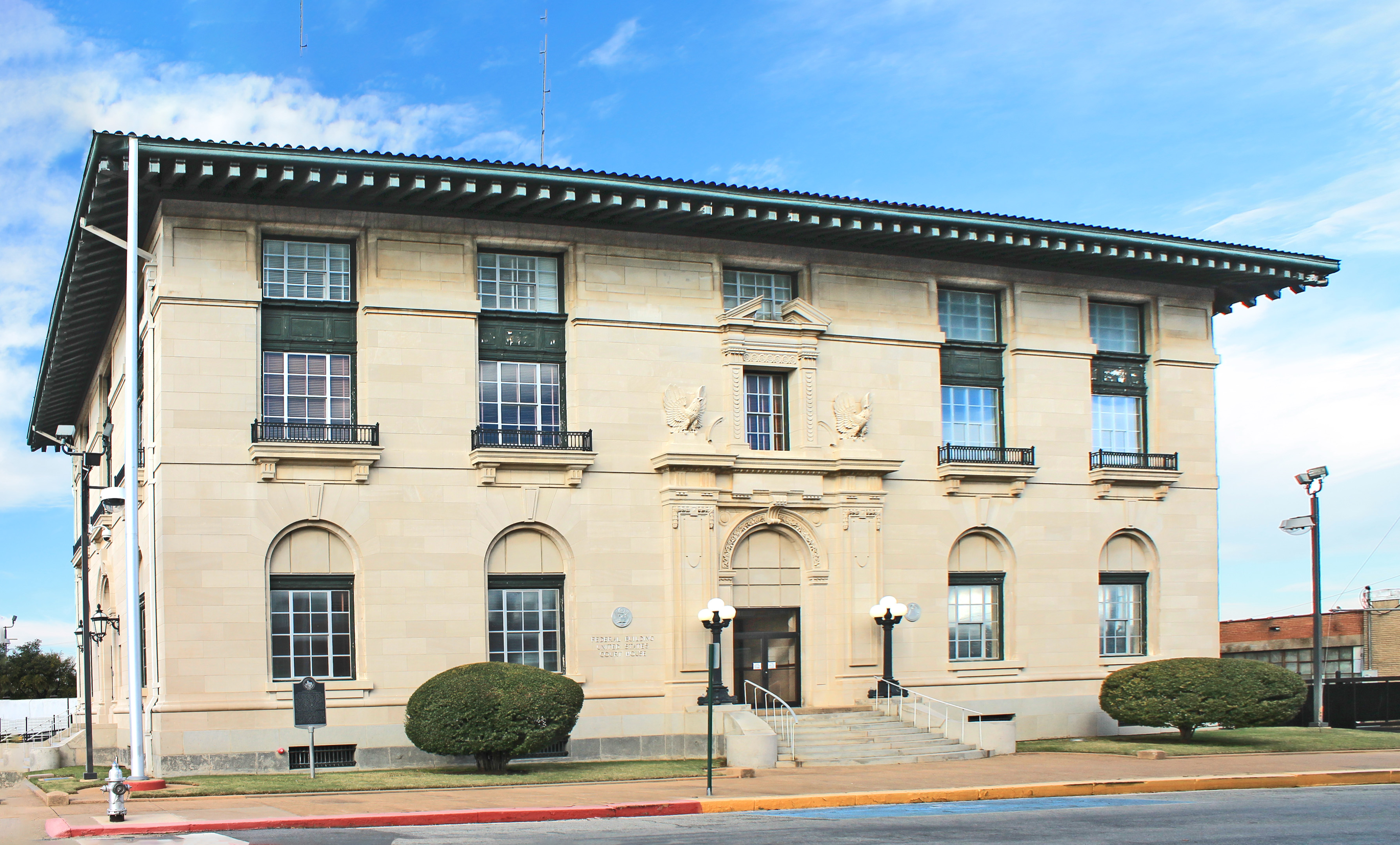
- Paul Brown United States Courthouse in Sherman
- Motto: "Classic Town. Broad Horizon."
- Location of Sherman, Texas
- Coordinates: 33°37′38″N 96°37′20″W
- Country: United States
- State: Texas
- County: Grayson
- Founded: 1846

Government
  - Type: Council-Manager

Area
  - City: 46.22 sq mi (119.72 km^{2})
  - Land: 46.15 sq mi (119.52 km^{2})
  - Water: 0.077 sq mi (0.20 km^{2})
  - Urban: 38.5 sq mi (99.7 km^{2})
  - Metro: 979 sq mi (2,536 km^{2})
- Elevation: 686 ft (209 m)

Population (2020)
  - City: 43,645
  - Density: 945.8/sq mi (365.18/km^{2})
  - Urban: 66,691 (US: 418th)
  - Urban density: 1,732.5/sq mi (668.9/km^{2})
  - Metro: 135,543
  - Metro density: 140/sq mi (54/km^{2})
- Time zone: UTC−6 (Central (CST))
  - Summer (DST): UTC−5 (CDT)
- ZIP codes: 75090-75092
- Area codes: 903, 430
- FIPS code: 48-67496
- GNIS feature ID: 2411888
- Website: www.ci.sherman.tx.us

Sherman is a city in and the county seat of Grayson County, Texas, United States and is part of the Dallas-Fort Worth, TX-OK combined statistical area. The city's population in 2020 was 43,645. It is one of the two principal cities in the Sherman–Denison metropolitan statistical area, and is the largest city in the Texoma region of North Texas and southern Oklahoma.

== History ==
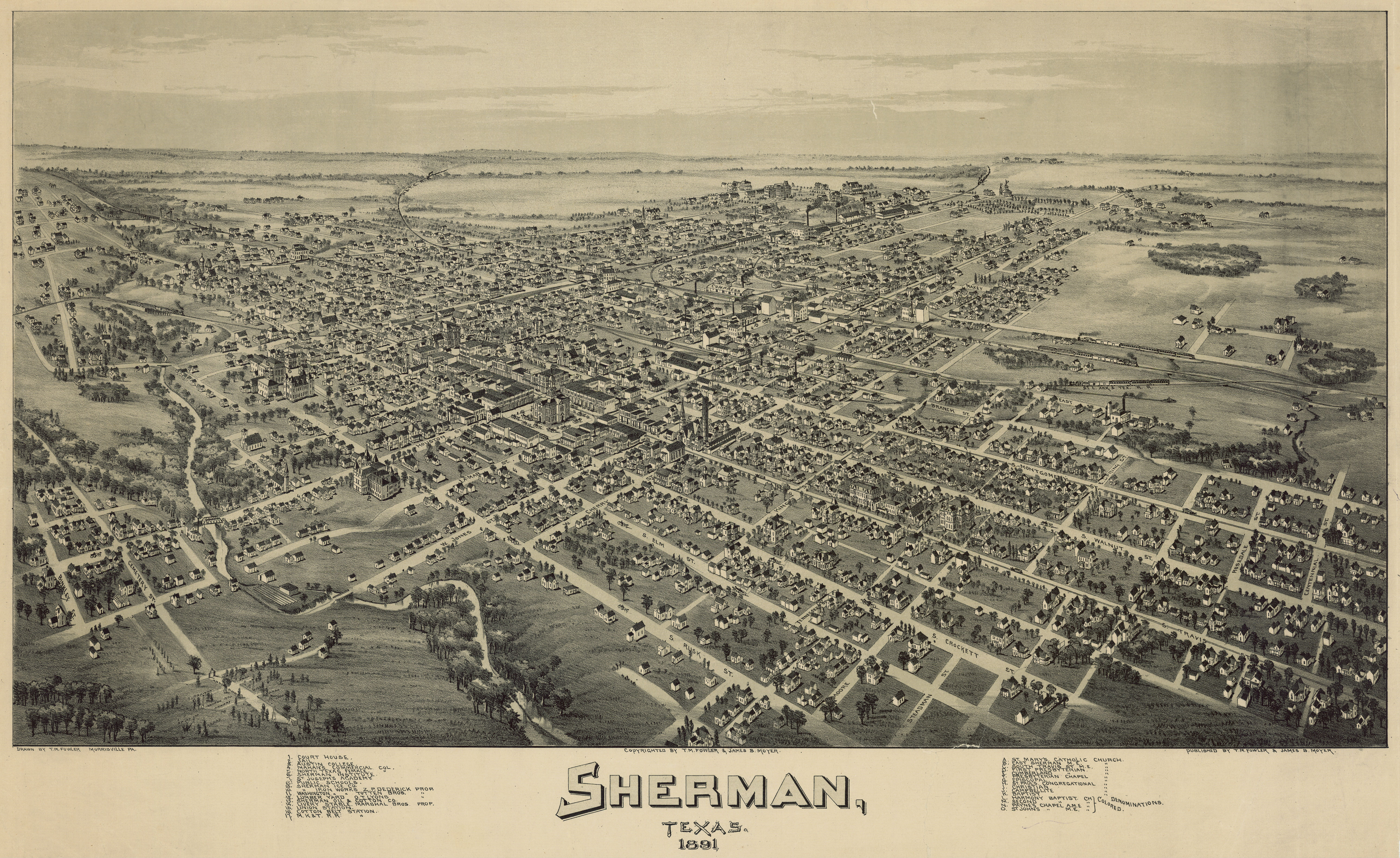
Sherman in 1891

Sherman was named after General Sidney Sherman (July 23, 1805 – August 1, 1873), a hero of the Texas Revolution. The community was designated as the county seat by the act of the Texas Legislature, which created Grayson County on March 17, 1846. In 1847, a post office began operation. Sherman was originally located at the center of the county, but in 1848, it was moved about 3 miles (5 km) east to its current location. By 1850, Sherman had become an incorporated town under Texas law. It had also become a stop on the Butterfield Overland Mail route through Texas. By 1852, Sherman had a population of 300 and consisted of a public square with a log court house, several businesses, a district clerk's office, and a church along the east side of the square. In 1861, the first flour mill was built.

During the 1850s and 1860s, Sherman continued to develop and to participate in regional politics. Because many residents of North Texas had migrated from the Upper South and only a low percentage were slaveholders, considerable Unionist sentiment existed in the region. E. Junius Foster, the publisher of Sherman's antisecessionist Whig newspaper, the Patriot, circulated a petition to establish North Texas as an independent free state. Following Confederate passage of a conscription law, resistance arose to conscription in North Texas, especially as owners of many slaves were exempt.

Late in the Civil War, pro-Confederate guerrillas led by William Quantrill spent the winter of 1863-1864 in North Texas, with a camp in Sherman and two others in nearby Kentuckytown to the south and Fink to the north. Former guerrilla Jesse James also came to Sherman for his honeymoon. He was photographed seated on his horse in Sherman.

During the 1860s, secondary education developed in North Texas. The Sherman Male and Female High School began accepting students in 1866, under the patronage of the North Texas Methodist Conference. It became one of three private schools operating in Sherman. The school operated under several names, including the North Texas Female College and Conservatory of Music from 1892 to 1919 and Kidd-Key College and Conservatory, from 1919 to 1935. It gradually lost Methodist support, following the opening of Southern Methodist University in Dallas in 1915. In 1876, Austin College, the oldest continuously operating college in Texas, was relocated to Sherman from Huntsville. The Sherman Female Institute, later called Mary Nash College, opened in 1877 under sponsorship of the Baptist Church. It continued to operate until 1901, when the campus was sold to Kidd-Key College. Carr–Burdette College, a women's college affiliated with the Disciples of Christ, operated from 1894 to 1929. Sherman also has a long history within the Jewish community. By 1873, Jews in the region regularly met for the High Holidays.

While general depression and lawlessness occurred during the Reconstruction, Sherman remained commercially active. During the 1870s, Sherman's population reached 6,000. In 1875, after two fires destroyed many buildings east of the town square, a number of civic buildings were rebuilt using more permanent materials. This included a new Grayson County Courthouse built in 1876. In 1879, the Old Settlers' Association of North Texas formed and met near Sherman. The organization incorporated in 1898 and purchased Old Settlers' Park in 1909.

On May 15, 1896, a tornado measuring F5 on the Fujita scale struck Sherman. The tornado had a damage path 400 yards (370 m) wide and 28 miles (45 km) long, killing 73 people and injuring 200. About 50 homes were destroyed, with 20 of them obliterated.

In 1901, the first electric "Interurban" railway in Texas, the Denison and Sherman Railway, was completed between Sherman and Denison. The Texas Traction Company completed a 65-mile (105 km) interurban between Sherman and Dallas in 1908, and in 1911 purchased the Denison and Sherman Railway. Through the connections in Dallas and Denison, travel to the Texas destinations of Terrell, Corsicana, Waco, Fort Worth, Cleburne, and Denton, became possible, as well as to Durant, Oklahoma, by interurban railways. One popular destination on the Interurban between Sherman and Denison was Wood Lake Park, a private amusement park at the time. By 1948, all interurban rail service in Texas had been discontinued.

=== Sherman Riot of 1930 ===
During the Sherman Riot of May 9, 1930, the Grayson County Courthouse was burned down by local citizens in an attempt to lynch George Hughes, an African American suspected of assaulting a white woman. During the riot, Hughes was locked in the vault at the courthouse and apparently died in the fire. Rescue work was hindered by saboteurs cutting the fire hoses. After rioters retrieved Hughes' body from the vault, it was dragged behind a car, hanged, and set afire. The black business section of Sherman was also burned down, and many African Americans fled. Texas Ranger Frank Hamer was in Sherman during this riot, and reported the situation to Texas Governor Dan Moody. Governor Moody sent National Guard troops to Sherman on May 9 and martial law was declared in Sherman for ten days. Fourteen men were later indicted, not for lynching, but for arson and rioting. In the end, only J.B. "Screw" McCasland was convicted and sentenced to prison for arson and for rioting.

== Geography ==
Sherman is located slightly east of the center of Grayson County, between Denison to the north and Howe to the south. The city has a total area of 41.5 square miles (107.4 km^{2}), of which 41.4 square miles (107.2 km^{2}) are land and 0.1 square miles (0.2 km^{2}), or 0.20%, is covered by water.

Sherman is 70 miles (110 km) north of Dallas and 31 miles (50 km) southwest of Durant, Oklahoma. Gainesville is 32 miles (51 km) to the west, and Bonham is 26 miles (42 km) to the east.

=== Climate ===
Sherman is part of the humid subtropical climate area.

Climate data for Sherman, Texas (1991–2020 normals, extremes 1897–present)
Month	Jan	Feb	Mar	Apr	May	Jun	Jul	Aug	Sep	Oct	Nov	Dec	Year
Record high °F (°C)	86 (30)	91 (33)	95 (35)	97 (36)	107 (42)	110 (43)	109 (43)	113 (45)	107 (42)	100 (38)	89 (32)	88 (31)	113 (45)
Mean daily maximum °F (°C)	52.6 (11.4)	57.1 (13.9)	65.2 (18.4)	72.6 (22.6)	80.0 (26.7)	88.1 (31.2)	92.5 (33.6)	92.7 (33.7)	85.4 (29.7)	75.3 (24.1)	63.3 (17.4)	54.2 (12.3)	73.2 (22.9)
Daily mean °F (°C)	43.2 (6.2)	47.1 (8.4)	55.1 (12.8)	62.7 (17.1)	70.8 (21.6)	78.9 (26.1)	83.0 (28.3)	82.8 (28.2)	75.8 (24.3)	65.2 (18.4)	53.7 (12.1)	45.1 (7.3)	63.6 (17.6)
Mean daily minimum °F (°C)	33.9 (1.1)	37.2 (2.9)	45.0 (7.2)	52.8 (11.6)	61.6 (16.4)	69.8 (21.0)	73.5 (23.1)	73.0 (22.8)	66.1 (18.9)	55.1 (12.8)	44.1 (6.7)	36.1 (2.3)	54.0 (12.2)
Record low °F (°C)	−2 (−19)	−3 (−19)	7 (−14)	28 (−2)	35 (2)	49 (9)	53 (12)	52 (11)	36 (2)	22 (−6)	13 (−11)	−2 (−19)	−3 (−19)
Average precipitation inches (mm)	2.52 (64)	2.76 (70)	3.96 (101)	3.87 (98)	5.54 (141)	4.54 (115)	2.90 (74)	2.88 (73)	3.43 (87)	4.77 (121)	3.50 (89)	3.62 (92)	44.29 (1,125)
Average precipitation days (≥ 0.01 in)	6.3	6.5	7.8	6.9	8.8	7.0	5.0	5.3	5.6	6.7	5.8	6.9	78.6
Source: NOAA

== Demographics ==
Historical population
Census	Pop.	Note	%±
1850	35		—
1860	613		1,651.4%
1870	1,439		134.7%
1880	6,093		323.4%
1890	7,335		20.4%
1900	10,243		39.6%
1910	12,412		21.2%
1920	15,031		21.1%
1930	15,713		4.5%
1940	17,156		9.2%
1950	20,150		17.5%
1960	24,988		24.0%
1970	29,061		16.3%
1980	30,413		4.7%
1990	31,601		3.9%
2000	35,082		11.0%
2010	38,521		9.8%
2020	43,645		13.3%
2024 (est.)	50,229		15.1%
U.S. Decennial Census

=== 2020 census ===
As of the 2020 census, there were 43,645 people, 15,687 households, and 10,097 families residing in the city. The median age was 35.8 years, with 24.1% of residents under the age of 18 and 16.2% aged 65 years or older. For every 100 females there were 92.8 males, and for every 100 females age 18 and over there were 89.8 males.

96.7% of residents lived in urban areas, while 3.3% lived in rural areas.

DP1 data enumerated 16,679 households in Sherman, of which 31.9% had children under the age of 18 living in them. Of all households, 42.6% were married-couple households, 19.0% were households with a male householder and no spouse or partner present, and 31.3% were households with a female householder and no spouse or partner present. About 30.0% of all households were made up of individuals and 12.7% had someone living alone who was 65 years of age or older.

There were 18,084 housing units, of which 7.8% were vacant. The homeowner vacancy rate was 1.6% and the rental vacancy rate was 7.4%.

Racial composition as of the 2020 census
Race	Number	Percent
White	26,333	60.3%
Black or African American	4,598	10.5%
American Indian and Alaska Native	758	1.7%
Asian	1,402	3.2%
Native Hawaiian and Other Pacific Islander	30	0.1%
Some other race	5,382	12.3%
Two or more races	5,142	11.8%
Hispanic or Latino (of any race)	10,579	24.2%

== Economy ==
In 2022, Texas Instruments broke ground to build an Integrated Circuit fab campus in Sherman. In late 2025, Texas Instruments began operations at a new $30 billion, 3,000-job, 300-millimeter semiconductor wafer fabrication plant near Sherman's southern city limits. GlobalWafers has opened a $5 billion, 1,500-job wafer factory nearby.

=== Top employers ===
- Tyson Foods
- Texas Instruments
- GlobalWafers
- Coherent Corp.
- Grayson County
- City of Sherman
- Cooper B-Line Systems
- Austin College
- Fisher Controls/ Emerson Process Management
- Presco Products
- Progress Rail
- Consolidated Containers
- Plyler Construction
- Starr Aircraft
- Offen Petroleum
- GlobiTech
- Sunny Delight Beverages

== Arts and culture ==
The Sherman Public Library serves the city of Sherman and all citizens. The library underwent a $2 million, floor-to-ceiling renovation in 2017, reopening to the public in August 2018.

== Sports ==
In 2023, organizers announced Sherman as the home of two new minor league sports franchises. A semi-professional baseball team called the Sherman Shadowcats began play in the Mid-American League during late spring of 2024. The club moved to the Texas Collegiate League for the 2026 season.

== Government ==
Sherman operates under a council-manager form of local government, and is a home rule city under Texas state law. As of 2026, the city was led by City Manager Dr. Zachary Flores and Mayor Shawn Teamann.

The Texas Department of Criminal Justice operates the Sherman District Parole Office in Sherman.

== Education ==
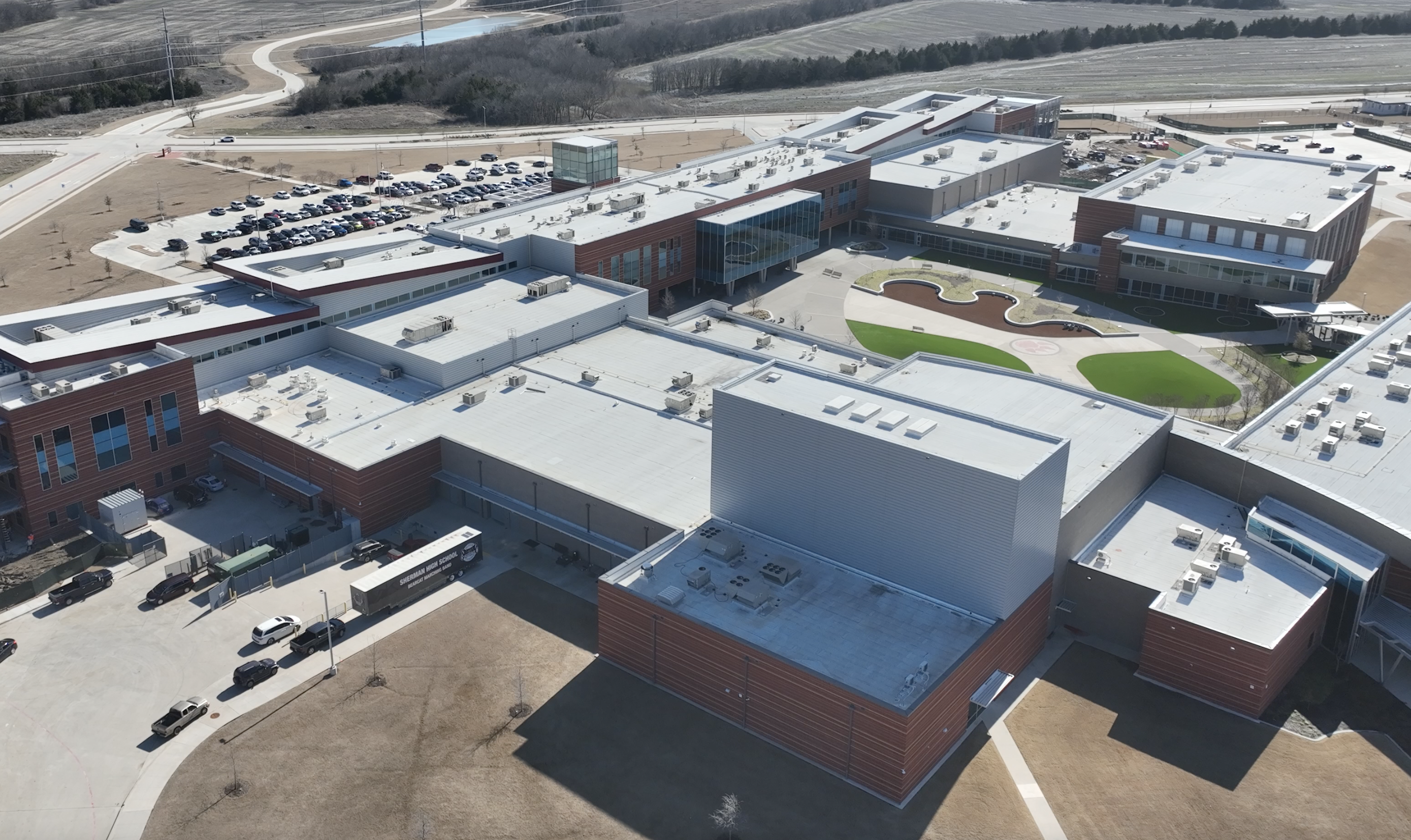
Sherman High School

=== Public schools ===
Most children in Sherman are zoned to the Sherman Independent School District, which includes Sherman High School. Some parts are in Denison Independent School District or Howe Independent School District.

=== Private schools ===
A small percentage of children attend one of the three private schools in Sherman: Grayson Christian School, St. Mary's Catholic School, or Texoma Christian School.

=== Colleges and universities ===
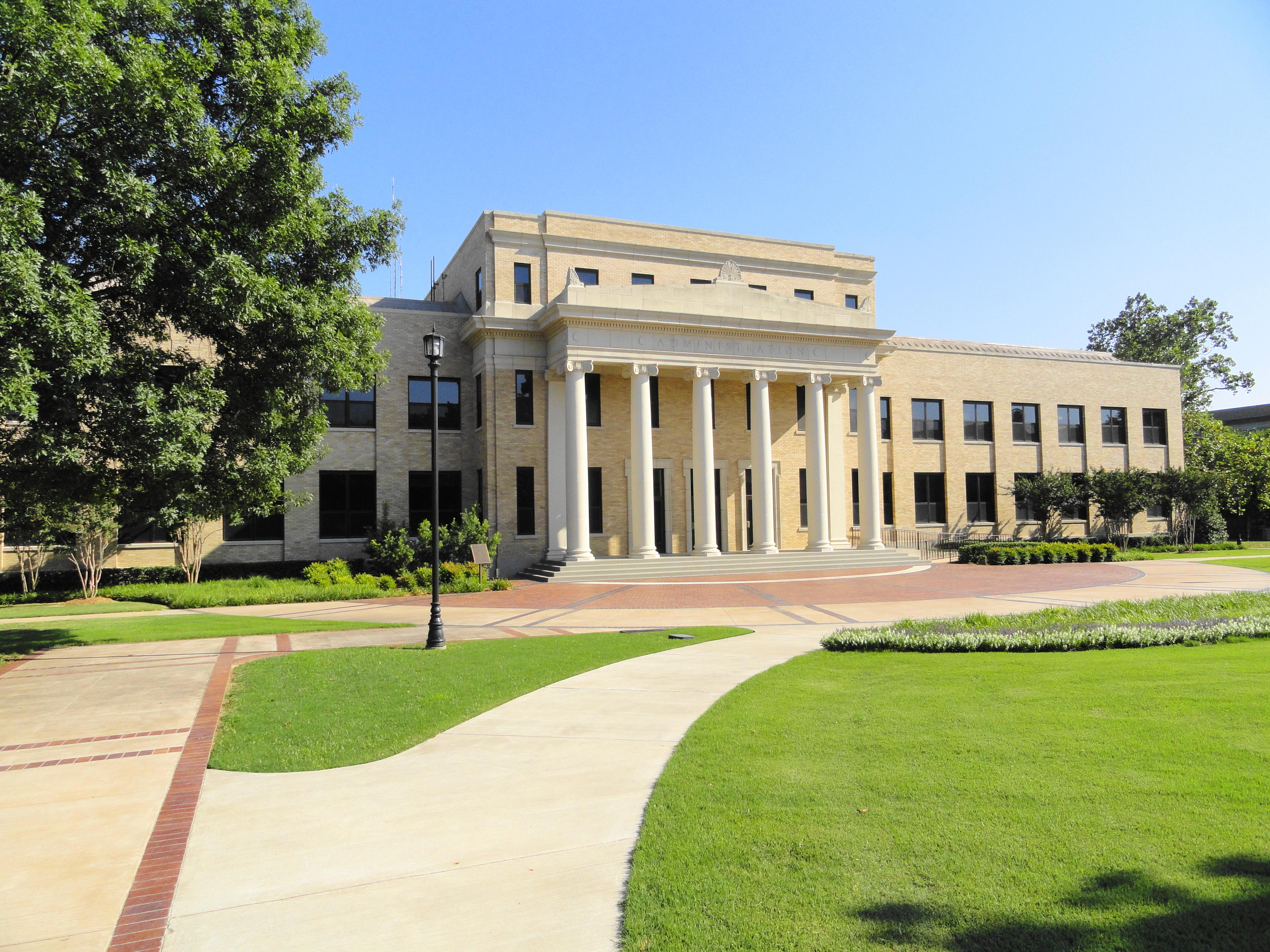
Administration Building on the Austin College campus

Austin College, a private, Presbyterian, liberal arts college, relocated to Sherman in 1876. Founded in 1849, it is the oldest college or university in Texas operating under its original charter. Grayson College, a community college based in neighboring Denison, operates a branch campus in Sherman.

== Media ==
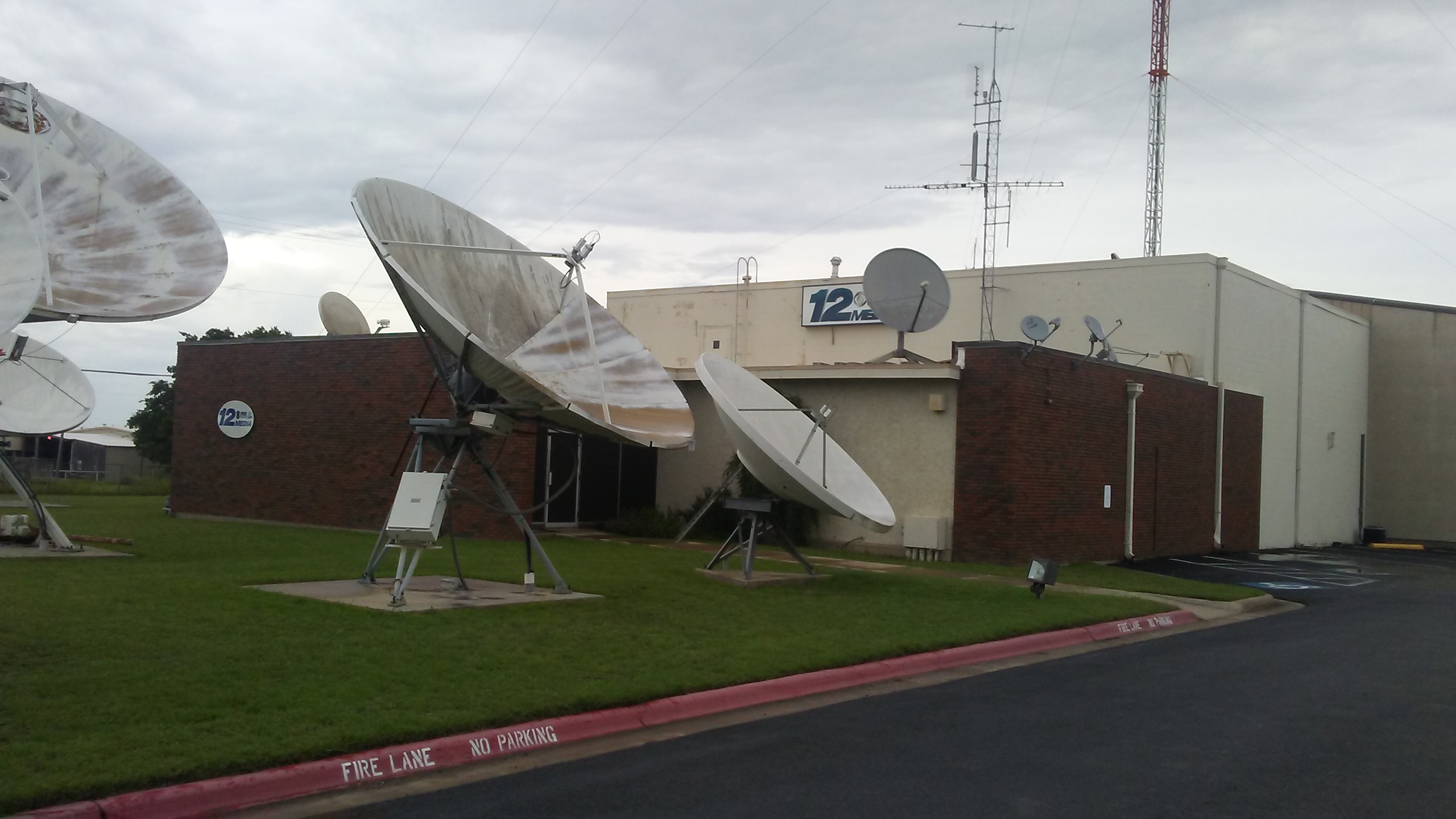
KXII television studio in Sherman

=== Magazine ===
- Texoma Living! magazine

=== Newspaper ===
- The Herald Democrat

=== Radio stations ===
- KLAK Adult Contemporary 97.5 K-LAKE FM
- KCBN 102.5
- KMKT Katy Country 93.1
- KQDR Hot 107.3 FM
- KJIM The Memory Maker AM 1500 and FM 101.3

=== Television stations ===
- KTEN Channel 10 – (NBC)
- KTEN DT Channel 10.2 – (The CW Texoma)
- KTEN DT Channel 10.3 – (ABC)
- KXII Channel 12 – (CBS)
- KXII DT Channel 12.2 (My Texoma)
- KXII DT Channel 12.3 (Fox Texoma)

== Infrastructure ==
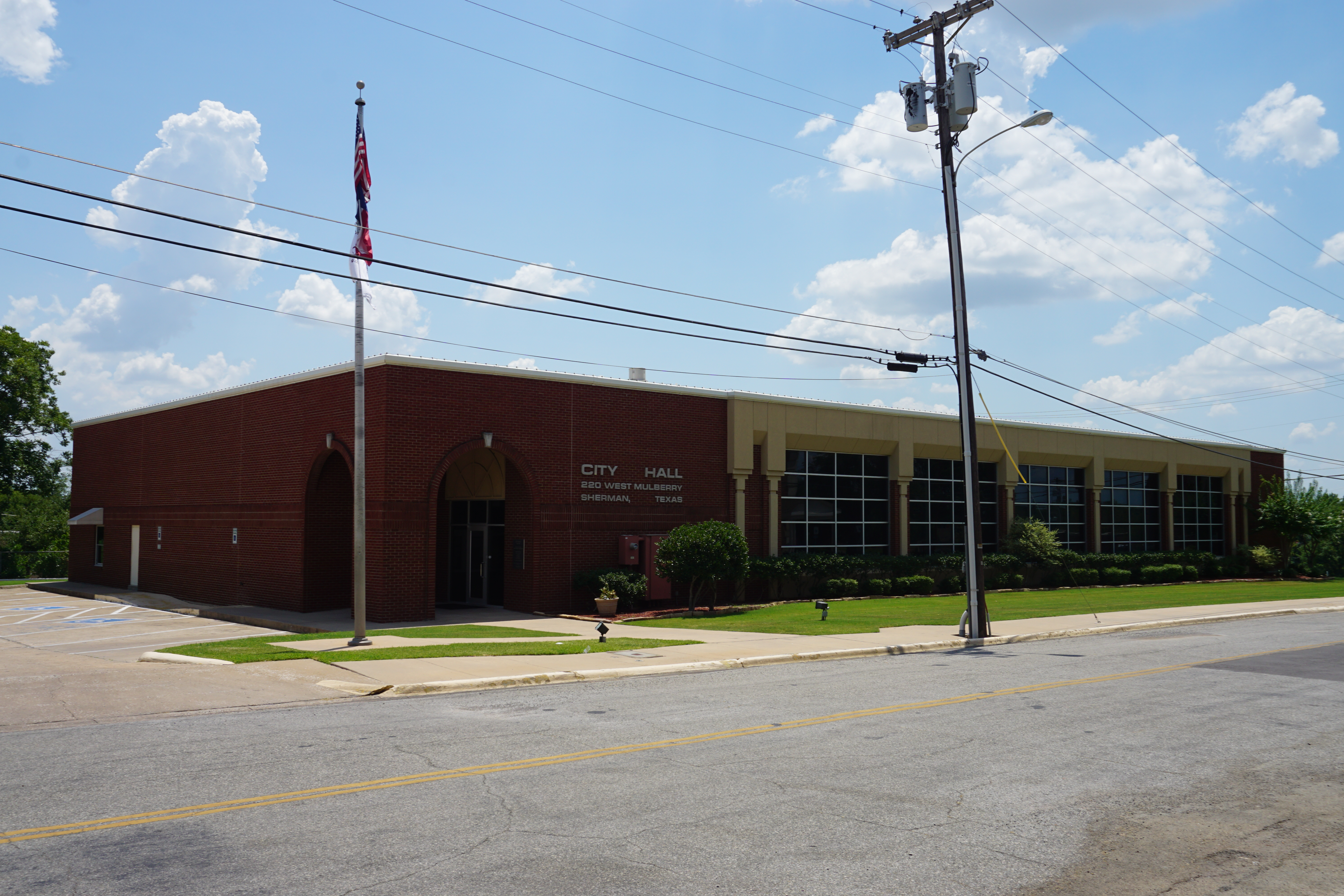
Sherman City Hall

=== Transportation ===
- U.S. Highway 75 north-south: Minnesota to Dallas, Texas
- U.S. Highway 82 east-west: Georgia to New Mexico
- SH 56 east-west: Honey Grove to Whitesboro
- SH 91 north-south: Achille, Oklahoma to Sherman
- SH 11 east-west: Linden to Sherman
- FM 1417 north-south: Denison to Sherman
- FM 691 east-west: Sherman to North Texas Regional Airport
- FM 131 north-south: Denison to Sherman
- FM 697 east-west: Whitewright to Sherman

Sherman is served by two U.S. Highways: US 75 (Sam Rayburn Freeway) and US 82. (The latter is locally designated as the Buck Owens Freeway after the famous musician who was born in Sherman.) It is also served by three Texas State Highways, which extend beyond Grayson County: State Highway 11, State Highway 56, and State Highway 91 (Texoma Parkway), one of the main commercial strips that connects Sherman and Denison, and also extends to Lake Texoma.

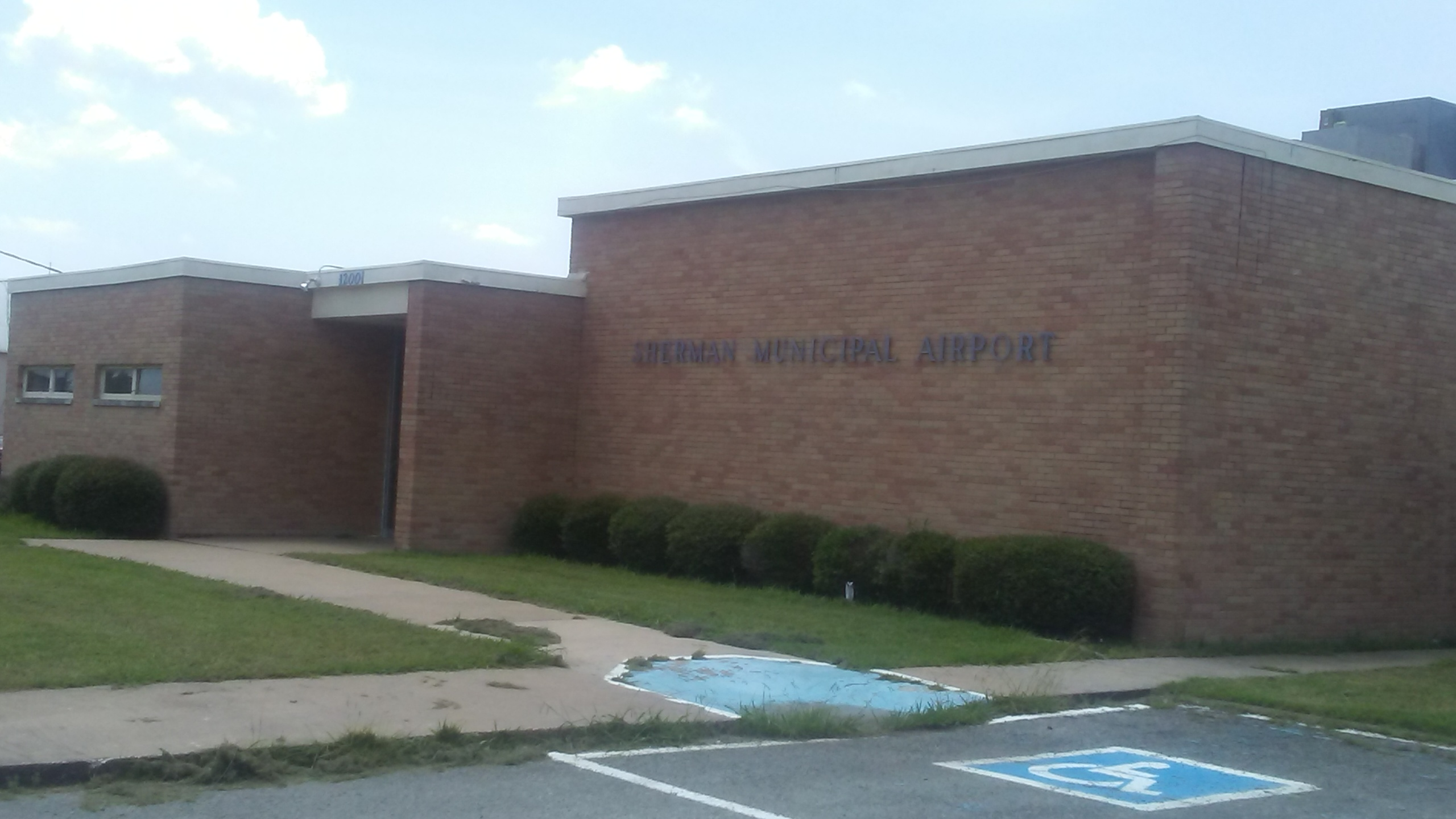
Sherman Municipal Airport

General aviation service is provided by Sherman Municipal Airport and North Texas Regional Airport/Perrin Field in Denison.

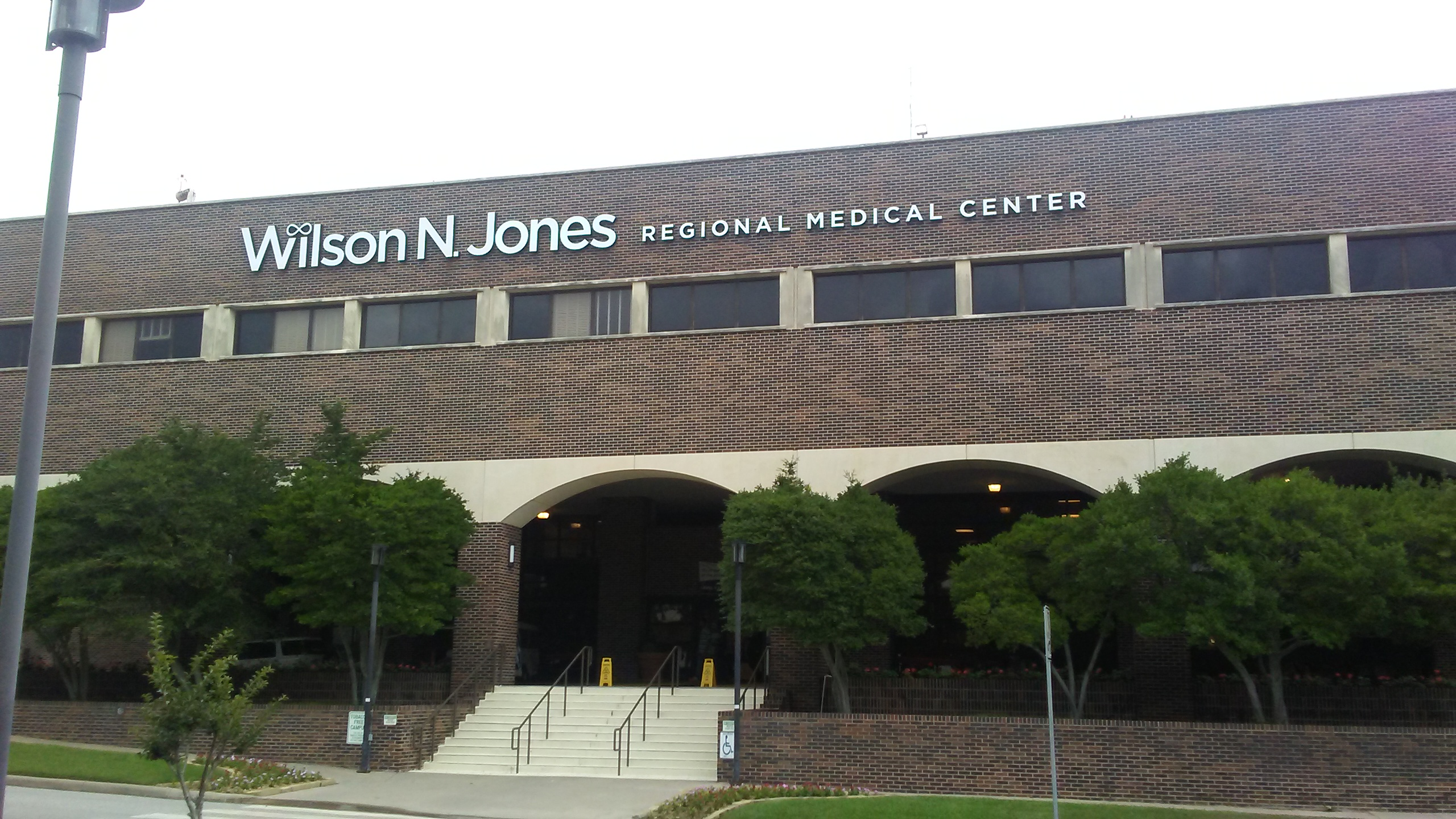
Wilson N. Jones Regional Medical Center in Sherman

TAPS Public Transit is the sole transit provider for Sherman, with curb-to-curb paratransit for all residents.

=== Medical care ===
The city of Sherman is served locally by Wilson N. Jones Regional Medical Center, Texoma Medical Center, and a Baylor Scott & White surgery center.

== See also ==
- May 1896 tornado outbreak sequence
- Sherman, Texas bus accident
- Sherman, Texas minor league baseball teams
