= Farm to Market Road 270 =

Highway in Texas, United States

Farm to Market Road 270
- Egret Bay Boulevard

Route information
- Maintained by TxDOT
- Length: 5.064 mi (8.150 km)
- Existed: 1970–present

Major junctions
- South end: FM 646 in League City
- SH 96
- North end: NASA 1 in Houston

Location
- Country: United States
- State: Texas
- Counties: Harris, Galveston

Highway system
- Highways in Texas; Interstate; US; State; Former; Toll; Loops; Spurs; FM/RM; Park; Rec
← FM 269	→ FM 271

Farm to Market Road 270 (FM 270) is a farm to market road in the U.S. state of Texas, located in the Houston–Sugar Land–Baytown metropolitan area. The road is known locally as Egret Bay Boulevard.

The short highway travels northwest (parallel to Interstate 45) from FM 646 (future SH 99) in League City, crossing over Clear Creek at the Galveston– Harris county line, to NASA Road 1 west of the Johnson Space Center.

== Route description ==
FM 270 begins at an intersection with FM 646 (future SH 99) in League City, Galveston County, heading north-northwest on two-lane Egret Bay Boulevard. The road heads past residential areas to the west and fields to the east before passing through more fields and reaching an intersection with SH 96. The highway continues into a mix of residential and commercial areas with some fields and trees. FM 270 becomes a five-lane road with a center left-turn lane and continues through more developed areas, turning northwest and crossing FM 518. The road widens to seven lanes total and passes businesses before heading into wooded areas and crossing the Clear Creek into the Clear Lake City section of Houston in Harris County. FM 270 heads through residential areas before passing commercial establishments and ending at an interchange with NASA Road 1. Past here, the road becomes El Camino Real.

== History ==
=== Previous route ===
A previous route numbered FM 270 was designated in Hopkins County on June 11, 1945, on a route from US 67, 5.2 miles (8.4 km) miles east of Sulphur Bluff, to Dike. On November 23, 1948, the road was extended south 4.1 miles (6.6 km) miles to a road intersection, creating a concurrency with US 67. On September 28, 1949, the road was extended south 3.7 miles (6.0 km) miles to SH 11 in Como. On August 8, 1951, the road was extended south 5.5 miles (8.9 km) to a road intersection, replacing FM 1698. On December 17, 1952, the road was extended northeastward 5.8 miles (9.3 km) from Dike to a road intersection. On August 24, 1955, the road was extended east and north to Pickton, creating a concurrency with SH 11. On October 31, 1957, the road was extended north 5.4 miles (8.7 km) to FM 71. On October 31, 1958, the road was extended north 2.0 miles (3.2 km) miles from FM 71. FM 270's designation was cancelled on December 21, 1959; the section from north of FM 71 south to FM 2476 became part of FM 69, and the section from FM 2476 to SH 11 was transferred to FM 269.

=== Current route ===
The current FM 270 was designated on October 30, 1970, running from NASA Road 1 to FM 518. It was extended on August 31, 1987, to its current length. On June 27, 1995, the entire route was redesignated Urban Road 270 (UR 270). The designation reverted to FM 270 with the elimination of the Urban Road system on November 15, 2018.

== Major intersections ==
County	Location	mi	km	Destinations	Notes
Galveston	League City	0.000	0.000	FM 646 (16th Street)	
Galveston	League City			SH 96 (League City Parkway)	
Galveston	League City			FM 518 (East Main Street)	
Harris	Houston	5.064	8.150	NASA 1 (East NASA Parkway)	Interchange
1.000 mi = 1.609 km; 1.000 km = 0.621 mi
