= Miller Grove =

Miller Grove may refer to:

- Miller Grove, Texas, an unincorporated community in Texas
  - Miller Grove High School (Texas), a high school within Miller Grove, Texas
  - Miller Grove Independent School District, a Texan school district
- Miller Grove High School (Georgia), a high school in Georgia
- Miller Grove, Illinois, former African-American settlement in Pope County
- Barrington, Illinois, in Cook and Lake Counties, which subsumed former community of Miller Grove
