= Paris Junior College =

Community college based in Paris, Texas, U.S.

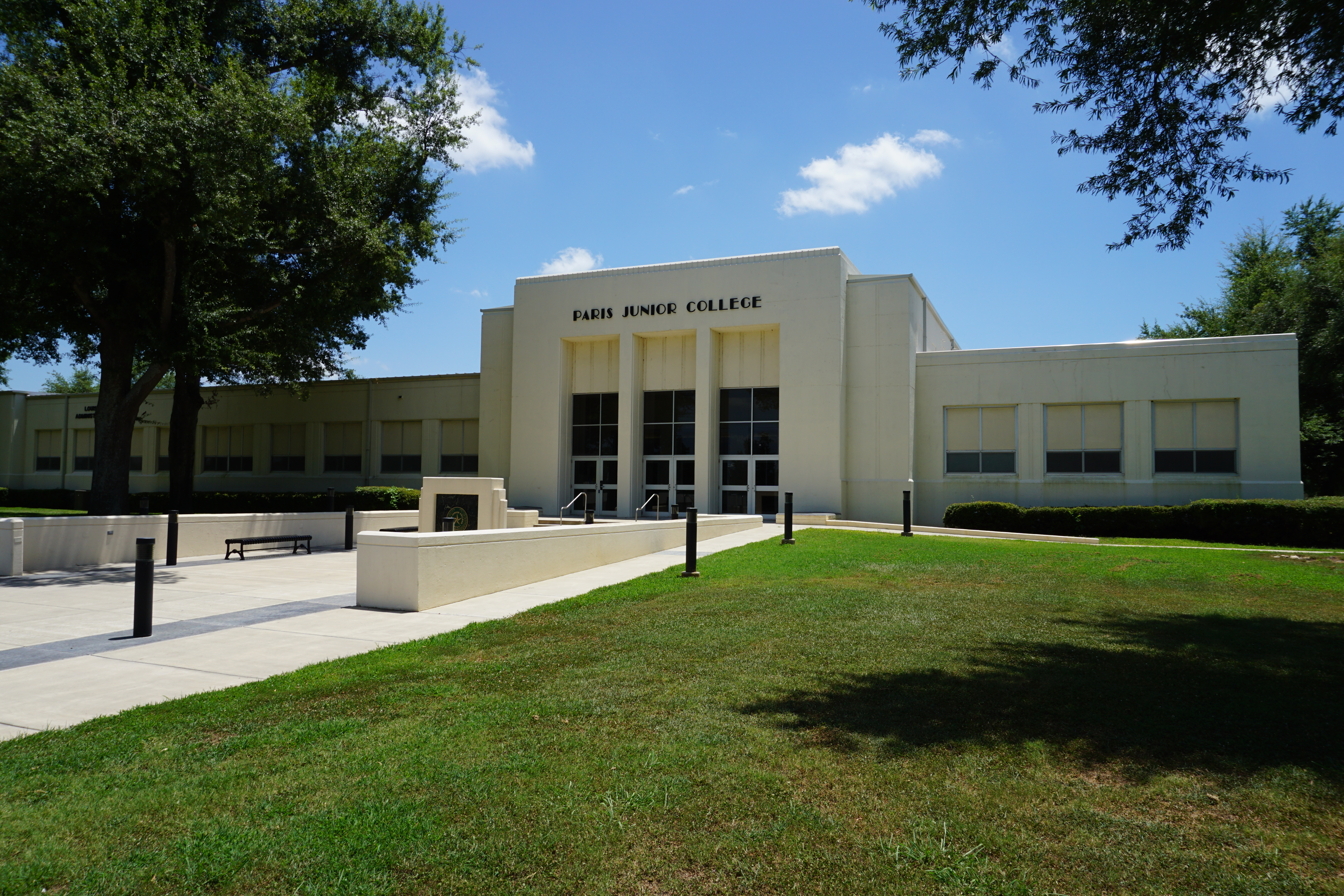
- Paris Junior College's Louis B. Williams Administration Building
- Type: Public community college
- Established: 1924
- President: Stephen Benson
- Undergraduates: 5,000+
- Location: Paris, Texas, U.S. 33.651317°N 95.529523°W
- Campus: Rural
- Colors: Green and gold
- Nickname: Dragons
- Sporting affiliations: NJCAA – Southwest
- Website: www.parisjc.edu

Paris Junior College (PJC) is a public community college with three campuses in East Texas: Paris, Greenville, and Sulphur Springs. The college was founded in 1924 as a campus of Paris Independent School District. Nearly 5,000 students are enrolled at the college.

== Service area ==
As defined by the Texas Legislature, the official service area of PJC consists of the following:

- the Paris Independent School District,
- the part of the Prairiland Independent School District that was formerly the Cunningham School District,
- the municipality of Paris, Texas,
- all of Lamar and Delta counties,
- the Detroit Independent School District and Clarksville Independent School District and the Rivercrest Independent School District that is in Red River County (formerly known as the Talco-Bogata Consolidated Independent School District),
- the North Hopkins Independent School District, Sulphur Bluff Independent School District, Sulphur Springs Independent School District, Miller Grove Independent School District, and Cumby Independent School District, located in Hopkins County,
- the Honey Grove Independent School District located in Fannin County
- the Fannindel Independent School District located in Fannin and Delta counties,
- all of Hunt County, except the portion located in the Terrell Independent School District, and
- the portion of the Prairiland Independent School District located in Red River County.

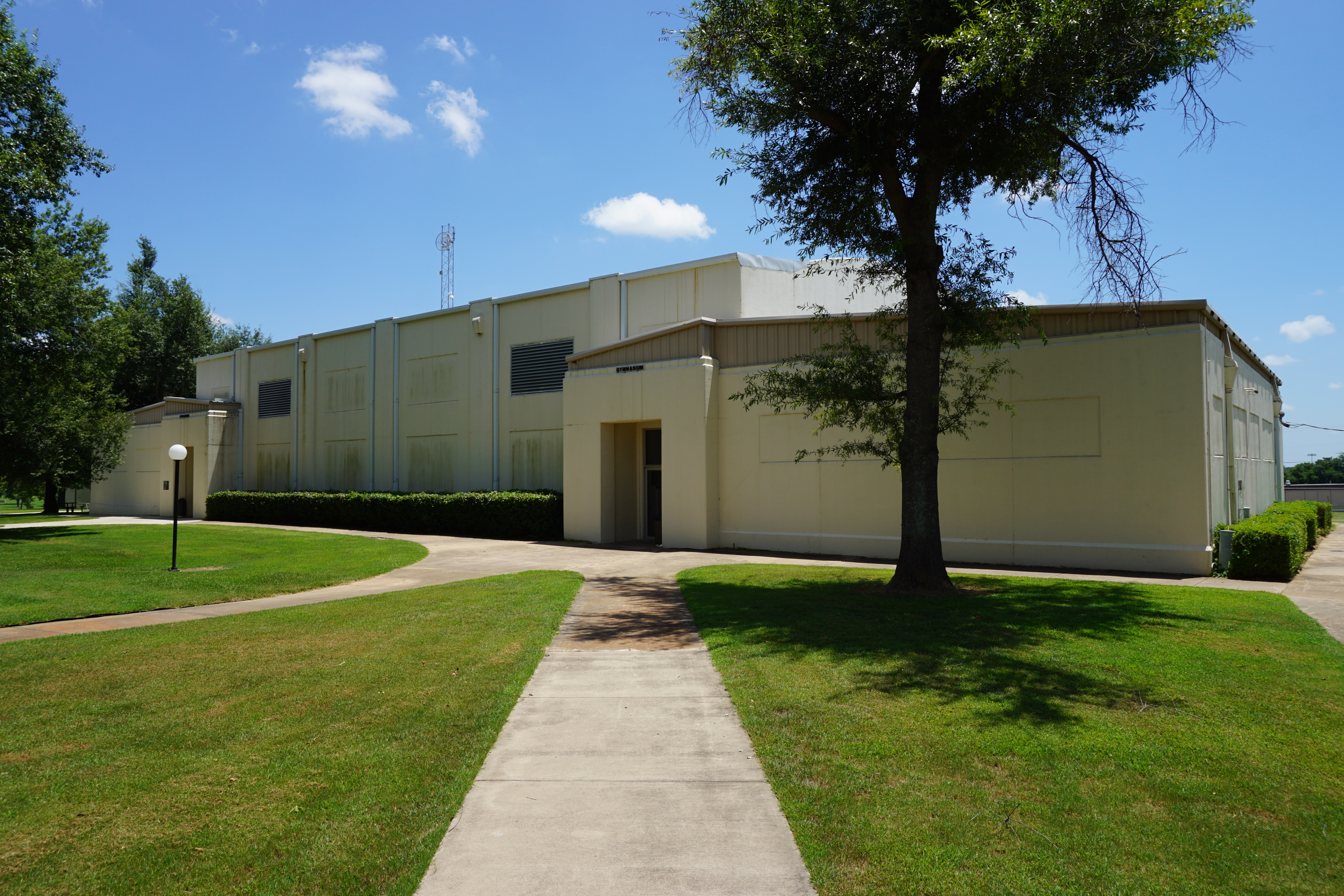
The Gymnasium in July 2015

== Athletics ==
Paris Junior College's mascot is the Dragon and the school colors are green and gold. The men's teams go by "Dragons" while the women's teams are "Lady Dragons." The athletic teams compete in the Southwest Junior College Conference (SJCC) of the National Junior College Athletic Association (NJCAA). PJC offers athletic scholarships in baseball, softball, men and women's basketball, and men's and women's soccer.

Paris fielded first fielded a football team in 1925 with Hub Hollis as head coach. Boyd Converse was the program's final coach before the football was dropped after the 1961 season.

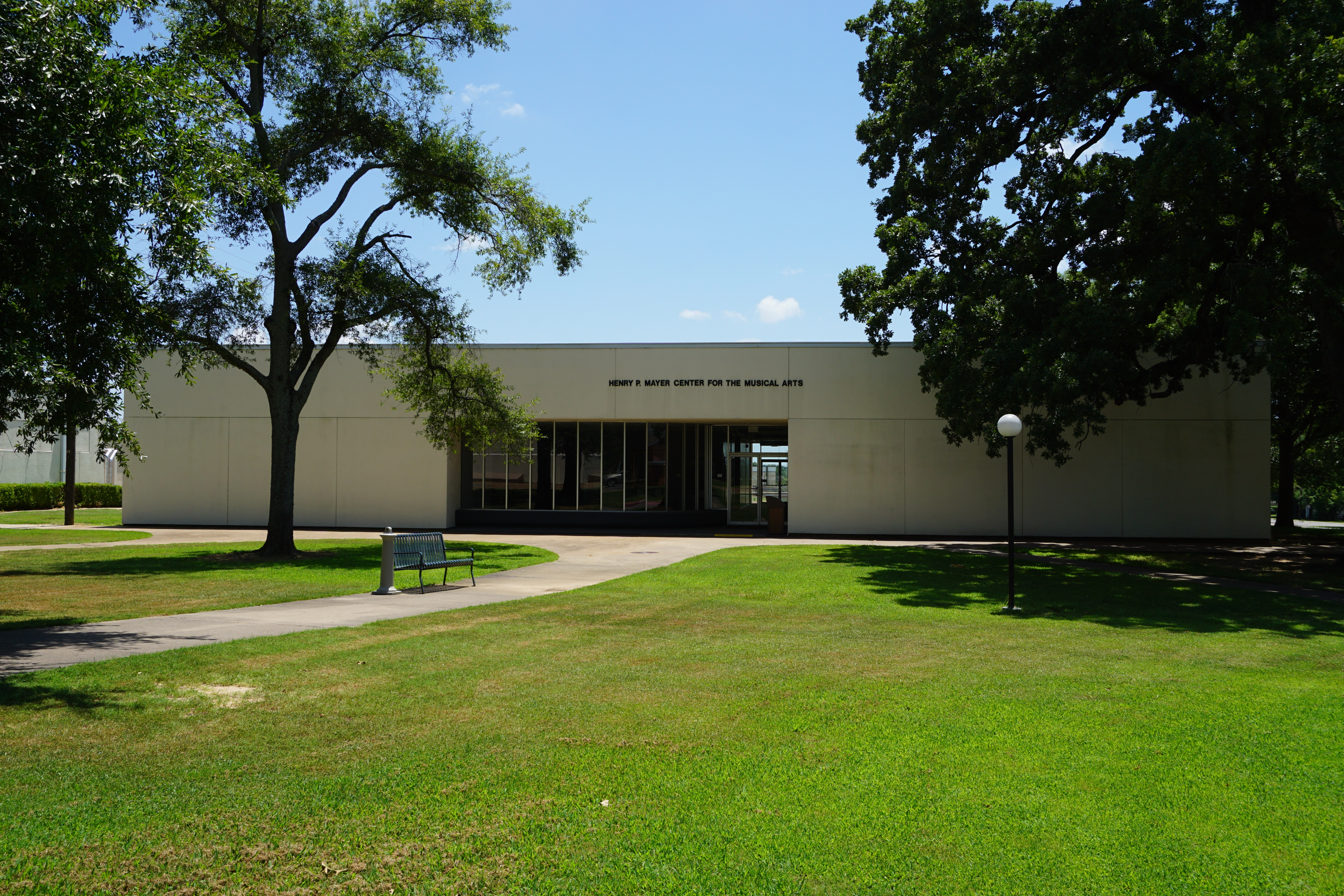
The Henry P. Mayer Center for the Musical Arts in July 2015

== Notable alumni ==
- A. M. Aikin Jr. Texas state legislator and lawyer
- James R. Biard (c. 1951), engineer and inventor
- Brenda Cherry, civil rights activist
- Marsha Farney (c. 1990), member of the Texas House of Representatives from District 20 in Williamson County
- Jim Hess, former college football coach and NFL scout
- Eddie Robinson Former Professional Baseball player, coach, and executive

== See also ==
- H. L. "Hub" Hollis Field
