= KRBR =

KRBR may refer to:

- KRBR (FM), a defunct radio station (88.9 FM) formerly licensed to serve La Barge, Wyoming, United States
- KDEB (AM), a radio station (1470 AM) licensed to serve Estes Park, Colorado, United States, which held the call sign KRBR from 2011 to 2012
- KETE, a radio station (99.7 FM) licensed to serve Sulphur Bluff, Texas, United States, which held the call sign KRBR from 2009 to 2010
- KDKE, a radio station (102.5 FM) licensed to serve Superior, Wisconsin, United States, which held the call sign KRBR-FM from 1996 to 2008
