= Brashear, Texas =

- Unincorporated community
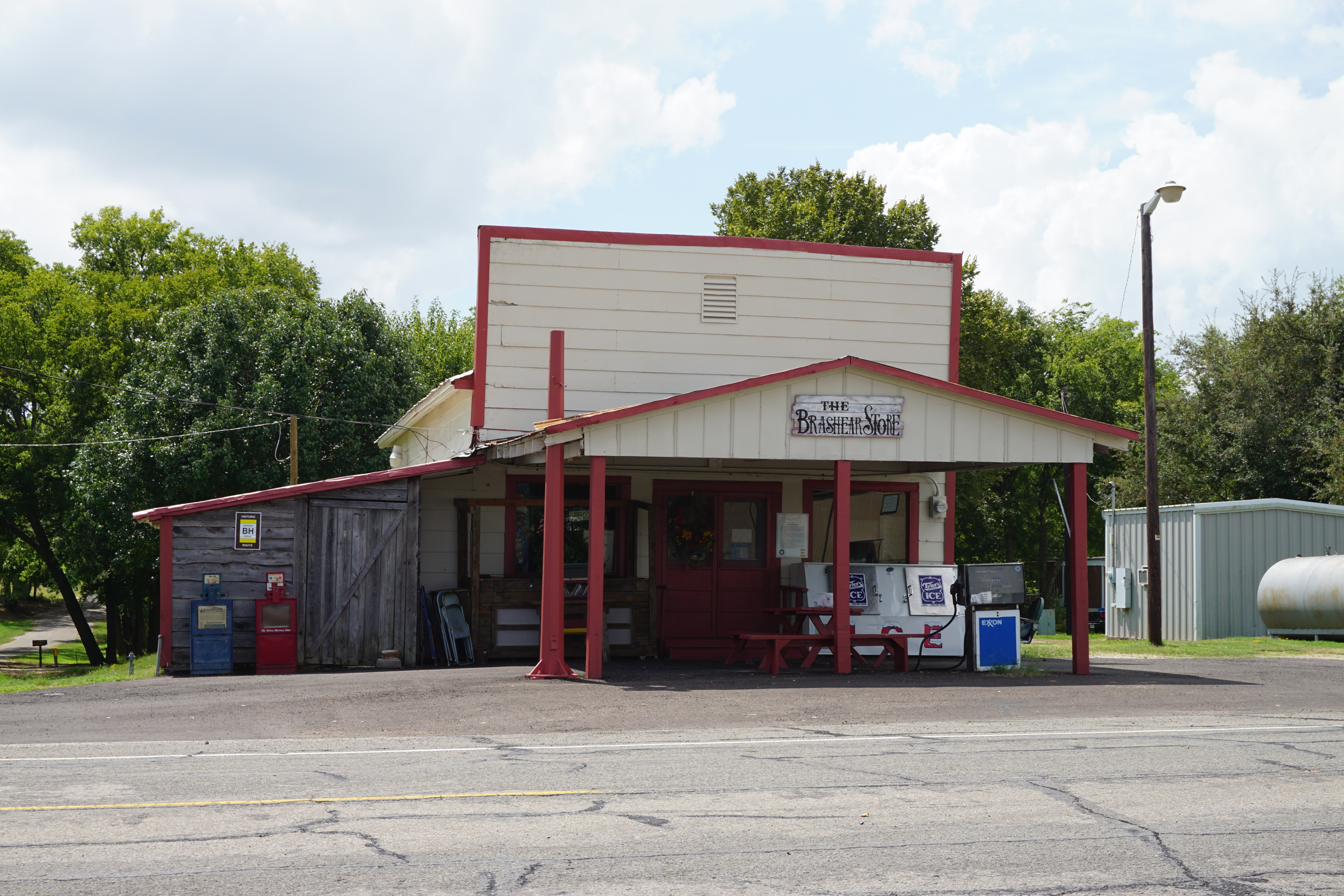
- The Brashear Store

- Location within Texas Location within the United States
- Coordinates: 33°07′07″N 95°44′01″W
- Country: United States
- State: Texas
- County: Hopkins

Area
  - Land: 36.6 sq mi (95 km^{2})
  - Water: 0.48 sq mi (1.2 km^{2})
- Elevation: 554 ft (169 m)
  - Density: 28.2/sq mi (10.9/km^{2})
- Time zone: UTC-6 (Central (CST))
  - Summer (DST): UTC-5 (CDT)
- ZIP Code: 75420
- Area codes: 430 & 903
- GNIS feature ID: 1331201

Brashear (/brəˈʃɪər/ brə-SHEER) is an unincorporated community located on Interstate Highway 30 and Farm to Market Road 2653 in west central Hopkins County, Texas, United States. Brashear has a post office (with the ZIP code 75420), church, farm buildings, a radio building, and other buildings.

== History to present ==
Brashear was founded in 1868, and it was named for Joseph Brashear, who surveyed the townsite with settlement and foundation. The area was part of the Wise Ranch in 1898, when G. W. Mahoney bought the ranch, divided it into small farms, laid out the townsite, and donated land for a school, a church, and a cemetery. A post office was established at Brashear in 1899, with W. G. Crain as postmaster. A school opened the same year, and in 1905 it had an enrollment of 149.

By 1914, the town had Baptist, Christian, and Methodist churches, a bank, a newspaper, a telegraph connection, and a reported population of 400. Its population was estimated at 300 in the mid-1920s and 350 in the late 1940s. In 1948 the town had six stores, four churches, a two-teacher school, and a cotton gin.

The population declined during the 1960s to 280 and continued to be reported at that level in 1990 and 2000. In the late 1980s, Brashear had four churches, a factory, a post office, and a number of scattered houses.

== Geography ==
Brashear is located 8 miles (13 km) west of Sulphur Springs, and is located on Interstate Highway 30 and Farm to Market Road 2653 in west central Hopkins County.

== Climate ==
Brashear is considered to be part of the humid subtropical region.

== Demographics ==
As of 2000, and present, the population is unknown. But from census (according to MCDC and its demographic page of Brashear, Texas) of 2000, the population density was 28.2 people per square mile. And the racial make-up of the community was 91.9% White, 0.4% African American, 1.1% Native American, 6.4% from other races, and 0.3% two or more races. Hispanic or Latino of any race were 8.6% of the population.

== Transportation ==
Brashear is served by two highways that run through the city, and three farm-to-market roads:

- Interstate 30
- State Highway 19
- Farm to Market Road 1567
- Farm-to-Market Road 2653
- Farm to Market Road 275 South

== Education ==
Education for students in Brashear is provided through eight school districts in the area: Greenville, Commerce, Campbell, Lone Oak, Cumby, Miller Grove, Sulphur Springs and Emory.

== Church ==
Brashear is home to Brashear Baptist Church, a Southern Baptist congregation located at 98 FM 2653. It is affiliated with the Rehoboth Baptist Association and the Southern Baptist Convention.

The church has been active since the early 20th century and continues to serve as a focal point for the community. It has been featured in local news media for events such as:

- A 2016 multi-night revival service
- A 12-week family Bible study series in 2018
- Vacation Bible School in 2019, featuring the theme “Athens”

In 2024,2025,2026 the church hosted a revival featuring musical guests The McNeills.

the main building of brashear baptist church

Brashear Baptist Church also offers online service livestreams and community event postings through platforms like YouTube and Facebook.

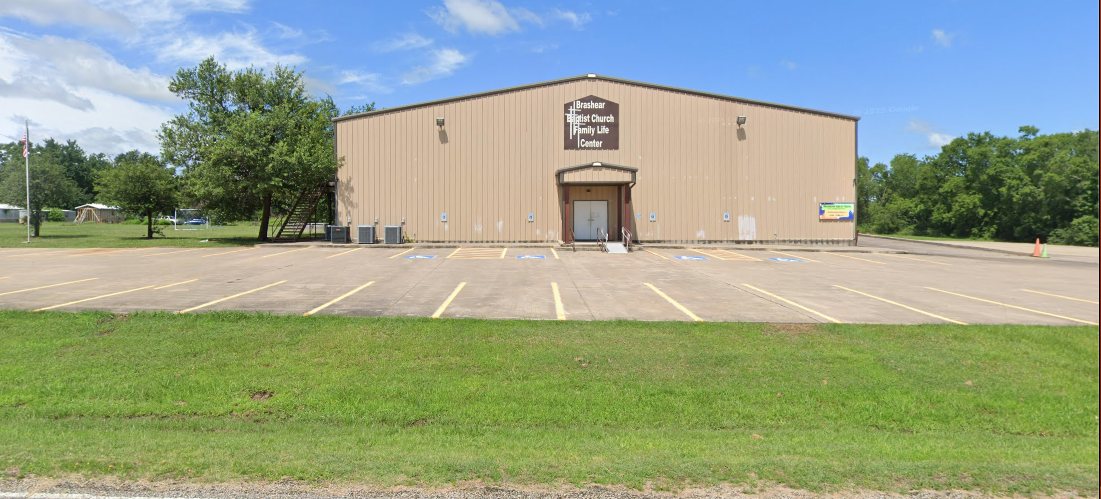
family life center (flc) of brashear baptist church
