= Dillon, Texas =

Ghost town in Texas, United States

Dillon is a ghost town in Hopkins County, Texas, United States, located 30 miles east of Miller Grove, near Saltillo. The town was named after E. F. Dillon, who started operating the post office in his store in 1901. The post office closed in 1906, and in the mid-1930s the town disappeared from highway maps.

== In popular culture ==
Dillon shares a name with the fictionalized setting of Friday Night Lights. The series was filmed around Austin.
