= Bill Reeder =

American baseball player (1922–2001)

- Pitcher
- Born: February 20, 1922; Dike, Texas, U.S.
- Died: March 12, 2001 (aged 79); Sulphur Springs, Texas, U.S.
- Batted: Right Threw: Right

MLB debut
- April 23, 1949, for the St. Louis Cardinals

Last MLB appearance
- September 22, 1949, for the St. Louis Cardinals

MLB statistics
- Win–loss record: 1–1
- Earned run average: 5.08
- Strikeouts: 21
- Stats at Baseball Reference

Teams
- St. Louis Cardinals (1949)

William Edgar Reeder (February 20, 1922 – March 12, 2001) was an American professional baseball pitcher who appeared in one season and 21 games in Major League Baseball for the 1949 St. Louis Cardinals. A right-hander who was listed as 6 feet 5 inches (1.96 m) tall and 205 pounds (93 kg), he was born in Dike, Texas, an unincorporated community in Hopkins County.

Reeder's pro career began in 1940 in the Class C East Texas League, and was interrupted by three years of World War II service in the United States Army. Baseball in Wartime reports that, as a member of the 381st Infantry Regiment of the 96th Infantry Division, Reeder saw combat at the Battle of Okinawa in 1945. With his unit under sustained attack from Japanese Army mortar fire, the pre-war minor league pitcher successfully called upon his arm strength to hurl hand grenades at the enemy emplacement, silencing the mortars. For his action, Reeder was awarded a Silver Star.

Reeder resumed his baseball career in 1946 and was acquired by the Cardinals in that autumn's minor league draft. In 1948, he won 19 games for Triple-A Rochester, earning him a major-league trial with the 1949 Cardinals. He was a member of the Redbird pitching staff for the full 1949 campaign, splitting two decisions with no saves and a 5.08 earned run average in 21 appearances, 20 of them in relief. He permitted 33 hits and 30 bases on balls, with 21 strikeouts, in 332/3 MLB innings pitched.

In his lone assignment as a starting pitcher, he went 21/3 innings against the New York Giants on May 22 at Sportsman's Park, allowing four hits, four bases on balls, and four earned runs to take the loss, as the Giants defeated the Cardinals, 13–4. One month to the day later, Reeder earned his only MLB victory against the same team, throwing three shutout frames in relief against the Giants to enable the Redbirds to erase an 8–4 deficit and come back to win, 11–8.

Reeder's professional career ended after the 1952 minor-league season. He died in Sulphur Springs, Texas, at 79 on March 12, 2001.
