= Cumby High School =

Coordinates: 33.1357°N 95.8448°W

Cumby Collegiate High School

Location
- 402 Sayle Street; Cumby, Texas 75433; United States

Information
- School type: Public high school
- School district: Cumby Collegiate Independent School District
- Principal: Albert Abshire
- Teaching staff: 17.02 (FTE)
- Grades: 8-12
- Enrollment: 151 (2023–2024)
- Student to teacher ratio: 8.87
- Colors: Maroon & White
- Athletics conference: UIL Class 2A
- Mascot: Trojan
- Website: Official site

Cumby Collegiate High School is a public high school located in Cumby, Texas, USA and classified as a 2A school by the University Interscholastic League. It is part of the Cumby Independent School District located in western Hopkins County. The school is the only high school in the Cumby Independent School District.

In 2024, the schools was renamed from Cumby High School to Cumby Collegiate High School.

== Athletics ==
The Cumby Trojans compete in the following sports -

Cross Country, Football, Volleyball, Basketball, Powerlifting, Track and Field, Golf, Softball, and Baseball

=== State titles ===
- Girl's Powerlifting
  - 2012(1A), 2025(2A)
