= KPIT =

KPIT may refer to:

- KPIT Technologies
- Pittsburgh International Airport (ICAO code KPIT)
- KPIT (FM), a radio station (91.7 FM) licensed to Pittsburg, Texas, United States
