= North Hopkins High School =

Location
- 1994 FM 71 West; Sulphur Springs, Texas 75482-0415; United States; 33.270876°N 95.619209°W

Information
- School type: Public high school
- Established: 1942
- School district: North Hopkins Independent School District
- Principal: Tim Henderson
- Teaching staff: 23.85 (FTE)
- Grades: 7-12
- Enrollment: 233 (2023-2024)
- Student to teacher ratio: 9.77
- Colors: Red & White
- Athletics conference: UIL Class AA
- Mascot: Panther
- Yearbook: The Panther
- Website: North Hopkins High School

North Hopkins High School is a public high school located outside unincorporated Birthright, Texas (USA) and classified as a 2A school by the UIL. It is part of the North Hopkins Independent School District located in north central Hopkins County. The school has a Sulphur Springs, Texas address and is known in the area as Sulphur Springs North Hopkins. In 2015, the school was rated "Met Standard" by the Texas Education Agency.

== Athletics ==
The North Hopkins Panthers compete in these sports –

- Baseball
- Basketball
- Cross Country
- Golf
- Softball
- Track and Field
- Volleyball

=== State titles ===
- Girls Basketball –
  - 1958(B), 1959(B), 1960(B)
- Girls Cross Country –
  - 1993(1A), 2003(1A), 2004(1A)

==== State finalists ====
- Girls Basketball –
  - 1956(B)
