= Miller Grove High School (Texas) =

Location
- 7819 FM 275 S Cumby, Texas 75433-9711; United States
- Coordinates: 33.0216°N 95.8017°W

Information
- School type: Public high school
- School district: Miller Grove Independent School District
- Principal: Jill Smith
- Grades: 7-12
- Enrollment: 323 (2023-2024)
- Colors: Green & Gold
- Athletics conference: UIL Class A
- Mascot: Hornets
- Website: Miller Grove High School

Miller Grove High School is a public high school located in unincorporated Miller Grove, Texas (USA) and classified as a 1A school by the UIL. It is part of the Miller Grove Independent School District located in southwest Hopkins County. The school has a Cumby, Texas address and is sometimes referred to as Cumby Miller Grove. In 2015, the school was rated "Met Standard" by the Texas Education Agency.

== Athletics ==
The Miller Grove Hornets compete in the following sports:

Cross Country, Volleyball, Basketball, Track and Field, and Baseball.

=== State Titles ===
- Boys Cross Country
  - 2014(1A), 2017(1A), 2018(1A), 2019(1A), 2020(1A), 2021(1A)
- Girls Cross Country
  - 2015(1A), 2019(1A), 2022(1A)
