= Who'd Thought It, Texas =

Ghost town in Texas, US

Who'd Thought It was a farming community in northern Hopkins County, Texas, United States.

The community was located near Farm to Market Road 1536, east of Tira and north of Sand Hill. It was most likely settled after 1900. Its etymology is unknown. Who'd Thought It had two stores (the first of which was operated by Levi Kearny, according to the Texas State Historical Association) and several houses at one point before World War II; children attended the nearby school in Sand Hill. The stores eventually closed, and by the 1980s, Who'd Thought It had become a ghost town.

== See also ==
- List of ghost towns in Texas
