= KDEB =

KDEB may refer to:

- KDEB (AM), a defunct radio station (1470 AM) licensed to serve Estes Park, Colorado, United States
- KRBR (FM), a defunct radio station (88.9 FM) formerly licensed to serve La Barge, Wyoming, United States, which held the call sign KDEB from 2010 to 2012
- KOZL-TV, a television station (channel 27) licensed to serve Springfield, Missouri, United States, which held the call sign KDEB-TV from 1985 to 2005
