= Miller Grove High School =

Miller Grove High School may refer to:

- Miller Grove High School (Georgia), United States
- Miller Grove High School (Texas), United States

== See also ==
- Grove High School (disambiguation)
