= Houston Gulf Airport =

- IATA: none; ICAO: KSPX

Summary
- Airport type: Public
- Serves: Houston, Texas
- Location: League City, Texas
- Elevation AMSL: 21 ft / 6.4 m
- Coordinates: 29°30′30″N 095°03′05″W
- Interactive map of Houston Gulf Airport

Runways
| Direction | Length | | Surface |
| Direction | ft | m | Surface |
|---|---|---|---|
| 13/31 | 4,999 | 1,524 | Asphalt (Closed) |

Statistics (2002)
- Aircraft operations: 66/day
- Based aircraft: 80
- Source: Federal Aviation Administration

Houston Gulf Airport (IATA: SPX, ICAO: KSPX, FAA LID: SPX) was a single-runway airport located in eastern League City, Texas, United States. Its FAA code was SPX and its IATA code was also SPX.

== History ==
The airport opened in 1967 as the Spaceland Airport, a name related to the Johnson Space Center, located about 4 miles north of the airport.

A businessperson named James R. Bath purchased the airport on behalf of Salem bin Laden in 1977. Bath received a 5 percent interest in the companies that own and operate the airport. Salem bin Laden owned the airport for six years before his death in 1988. After Salem bin Laden died, the airport, now owned by his estate, was for sale.

The airport was scheduled to close on April 1, 2002. A coalition of the Aircraft Owners and Pilots Association and some local pilots created a campaign asking for the City of League City to acquire the airport from its owner. The airport's land was sold and the land became a string of houses along Texas State Highway 96. The group of houses are part of a 2,000-house community called Tuscan Lakes.
