= Addran, Texas =

Unincorporated community in Texas, US

Coordinates: 33°17′39″N 95°36′11″W

Addran is an unincorporated community in Hopkins County, in the U.S. state of Texas.

== History ==
A post office was established at Addran in 1890, and remained in operation until 1906. The community was named after AddRan Male & Female College.
