= KETE =

Radio station in Sulphur Bluff, Texas

- Sulphur Bluff, Texas; United States
- Broadcast area: Mount Pleasant, Texas
- Frequency: 99.7 MHz
- Branding: Three Angels Broadcasting Network

Programming
- Format: Christian
- Affiliations: Three Angels Broadcasting Network

Ownership
- Owner: Brazos TV, Inc.
- Sister stations: KSOC

History
- First air date: September 14, 2009
- Former call signs: KYZQ (2008–2009, CP); KRBR (2009–2010); KNOI (2010–2011)
- Call sign meaning: East Texas

Technical information
- Licensing authority: FCC
- Facility ID: 166035
- Class: A
- ERP: 2,300 watts
- HAAT: 113 meters (371 ft)
- Transmitter coordinates: 33°19′51.60″N 95°18′53.20″W
- Translator: 100.9 K265DW (Mount Pleasant)

Links
- Public license information: Public file; LMS

KETE (99.7 FM; "Three Angels Broadcasting Network") is a terrestrial radio station, licensed to Sulphur Bluff, Texas, United States, and owned by Brazos TV, Inc.

KETE broadcasts a Christian preaching format, featuring programming from the Three Angels Broadcasting Network.

== History ==
KETE received an initial License to Cover from the Federal Communications Commission on September 14, 2009. It was originally owned by La Ke Manda Broadcasting, and was sold to the current owner North Texas Radio Group, L.P. on January 11, 2012.

North Texas Radio Group, L.P. sold the facility to The Way Radio Group on August 11, 2014, with KETE becoming Christian Contemporary "99.7 Way-FM". North Texas Radio Group continued to lease their FM relay translator, 100.9 K265DW Mount Pleasant, Texas to The Way Radio Group in order to extend KETE's coverage area into Mount Pleasant, due to the facility's inability to provide the town city grade coverage itself.

On February 2, 2018, North Texas Radio Group L.P. re-acquired KETE from The Way Radio Group/Promise Radio Group. K265DW had been silent for nearly a year at the point of re-acquisition by North Texas Radio Group, and internal issues within The Way Radio Group led the company to sell the facility back to Dick Witkowski, who owns North Texas Radio Group.

The facility was silenced on March 21, 2018, and a construction permit has been granted to move KETE to a new broadcast tower site. While the facility will increase the height above average terrain to 113 meters, it will decrease ERP to 2.3 kilowatts. The facility had to return to broadcasting at either the currently licensed transmission site or under the new specifications listed in the construction permit granted by the Federal Communications Commission no later than March 21, 2019, or the license would have been revoked and deleted by Federal law. KETE returned to the air on March 19, 2019.

K265DW has also since resumed operations, changing its license to rebroadcast KPIT as its primary feed, although that facility has recently been sold to a new owner.

On October 10, 2019, North Texas Radio Group filed an application to transfer the license of KETE to Brazos TV Inc. for $122,500. A Time Brokerage Agreement took effect on October 10, with the station flipping to Three Angels Broadcasting Network, a Christian preaching and teaching format. The sale to Brazos TV was consummated on December 26, 2019.
