= Hopkins County Courthouse (Texas) =

- U.S. National Register of Historic Places
- Texas State Antiquities Landmark
- Recorded Texas Historic Landmark
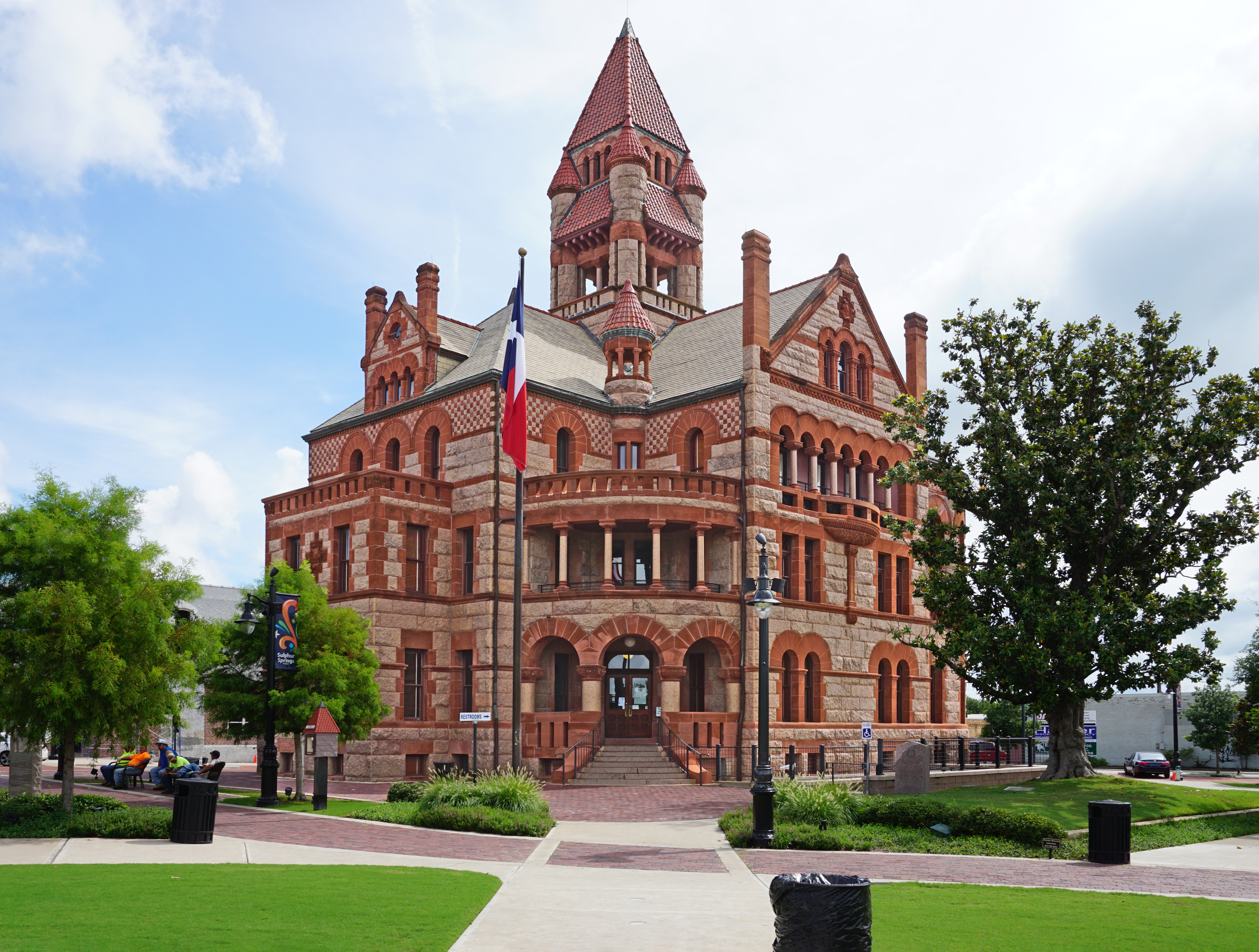
- The Hopkins County Courthouse as viewed from Courthouse Square in June 2015

- Location within Texas Location within the United States
- Interactive map showing the location of the Hopkins County Courthouse
- Location: Church and Jefferson Sts., Sulphur Springs, Texas
- Coordinates: 33°8′18″N 95°36′2″W
- Area: 0.3 acres (0.12 ha)
- Built: 1895
- Architect: James Riely Gordon
- Architectural style: Romanesque
- Website: Hopkins County, Texas
- NRHP reference No.: 77001453
- TSAL No.: 8200000368
- RTHL No.: 7315

Significant dates
- Added to NRHP: April 11, 1977
- Designated TSAL: January 1, 1981
- Designated RTHL: 1975

The Hopkins County Courthouse is a historic courthouse located in Sulphur Springs, Texas, the seat of Hopkins County. It was designed by San Antonio-based architect James Riely Gordon and constructed in 1894 and 1895. The courthouse was built in the Romanesque Revival architectural style with red sandstone and pink granite, and its design includes a number of unusual features, such as a double-helix staircase, a clockless tower, and entrances that are located on its northwest and southwest corners, instead of on its sides.

The building was restored in 2001 and 2002 at a cost of $3.66 million to the State of Texas and $1.3 million to Hopkins County, and it continues to serve as an operating courthouse that is open to the public on a daily basis. The courthouse has also received numerous awards and accolades, including its designation as a Recorded Texas Historic Landmark in 1975 and its addition to the National Register of Historic Places in 1977.

== Background ==
After Hopkins County was created by the Texas Legislature in 1846, Tarrant was initially designated as the county seat, and a courthouse was constructed there in 1853. In 1868, during the Reconstruction Era, the United States military moved the county seat to Sulphur Springs, which was at the time known as Bright Star. In 1882, Hopkins County constructed its first brick courthouse there; in 1894, this building burned along with the jail and a number of Sulphur Springs' commercial buildings, which necessitated the creation of a replacement courthouse.

== Design and construction ==
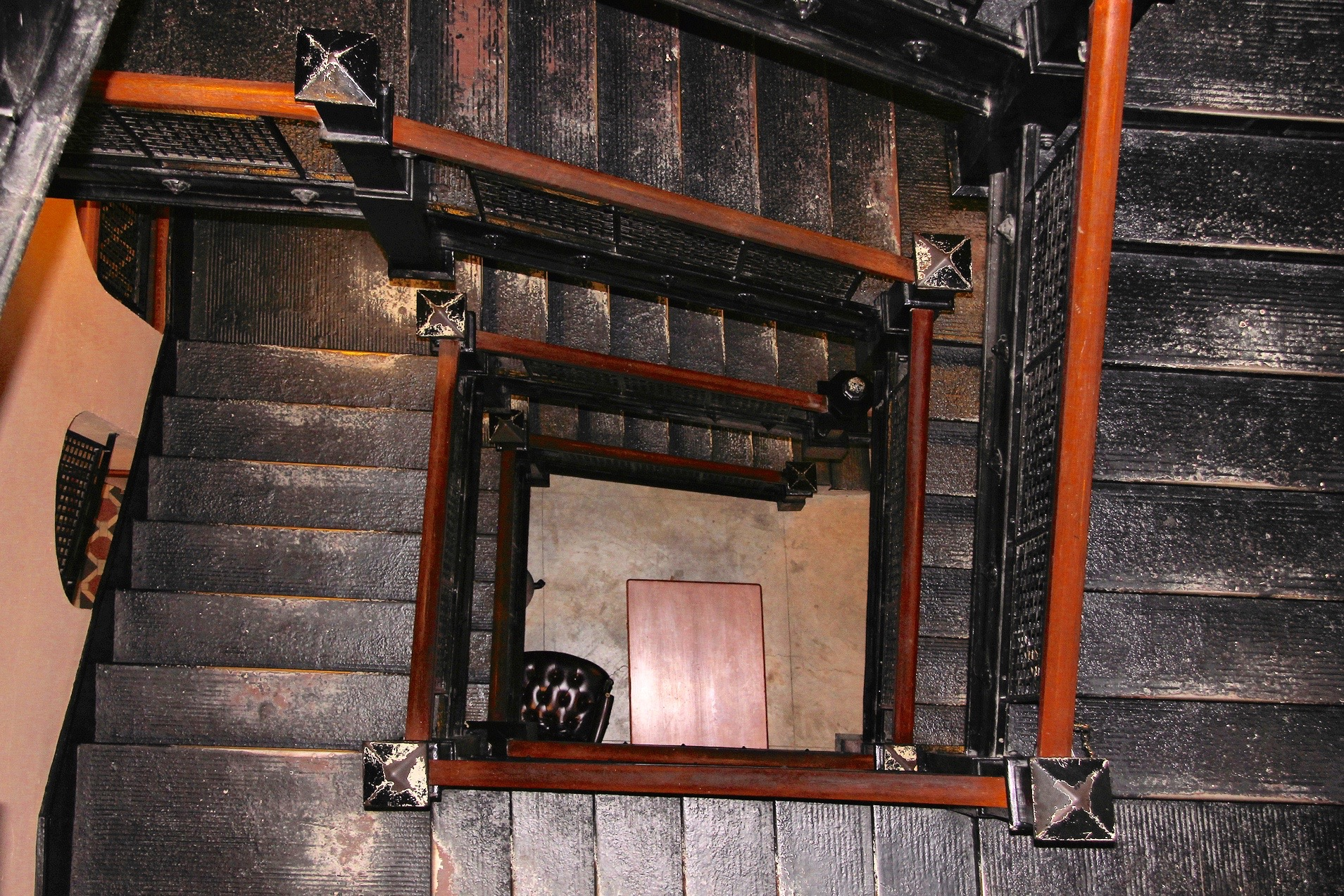
The courthouse's double-helix staircase

The courthouse, which was designed by San Antonio-based architect James Riely Gordon, was constructed in 1894 and 1895. It was one of approximately 18 Texas county courthouses designed by Gordon, whose architectural designs could also be found in Texas cities such as Decatur, La Grange, New Braunfels, San Antonio, Stephenville, Waco, Waxahachie, and Victoria.

The Hopkins County Courthouse was built in the Romanesque Revival architectural style with red sandstone and pink granite. It also features an unusual double-helix staircase with cast-iron stairs as well as marble wainscoting, masonry interiors, oak woodwork, and stone and tile flooring. The building was constructed with a clockless tower because, as one of the town's early leaders declared, "[i]f you get up when the sun rises and go to bed when it sets, you don't need a clock."

Due to its alignment on Courthouse Square, the building's entrances are somewhat unusually located on its northwest and southwest corners, instead of on its sides. Its entrances feature Roman arches with second-story porticos and third-story open porches above them.

Dallas-based Sonnerfield & Ammins received the contract to build the courthouse at a price of $52,410, although the cost ultimately climbed to $75,000, due largely to the added expense of installing steel bracing rods for enhancing the safety of the building.

== Restoration ==
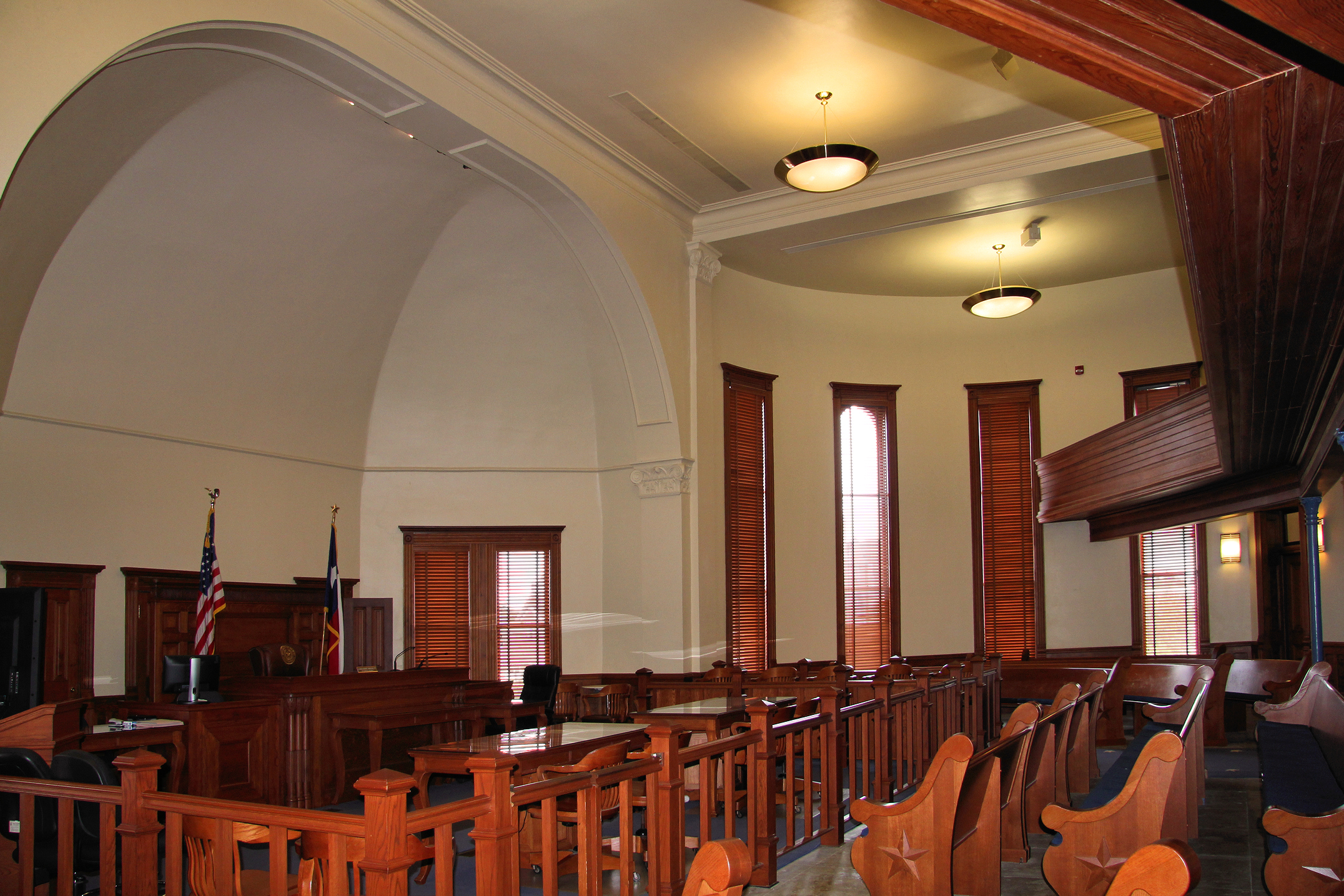
The second-floor courtroom in 2015, after being restored

The Hopkins County Courthouse was restored in 2001 and 2002. Prior to its full restoration, the building had only been repaired three times: in 1945, 1971, and 1979–80, the latter of which restored the appearance of the third-floor jury room. By the turn of the 21st century, years of wear and exposure to the elements had caused deterioration of the building's sandstone and windows as well as a persistent problem with groundwater infiltration. Other major problems afflicting the building included rotting window casings, a roof turret in danger of collapse, overloaded wiring, lack of an elevator, and the general sense that the entire courthouse was a fire hazard.

Completed in December 2002, the restoration refurbished both the interior and the exterior of the building, upgraded its systems, and brought it into compliance with the Americans with Disabilities Act (ADA). The restoration was handled by the Paris-based construction firm Harrison, Walker & Harper, while other companies such as Waco-based Johnson Roofing participated in the project as well. In total, the State of Texas spent $3.66 million on the restoration while Hopkins County contributed $1.3 million; the remainder of the funding was raised by private donors, $100,000 of which was contributed by Mary Bonham. After nearly two years of restoration, the courthouse was publicly rededicated on December 7, 2002.

== Operation ==
The Hopkins County Courthouse is an operating courthouse that is open to the public on a daily basis. As of 2005, it is still home to the 8th and 62nd Judicial Districts; it contains courtrooms, jury rooms, and the offices of the auditor, commissioners, county judge, district clerk, and treasurer. In 2005 the building was also available for use as a concert and wedding venue.

== Awards and accolades ==
The Hopkins County Courthouse was named a Recorded Texas Historic Landmark in 1975, and it was added to the National Register of Historic Places in 1977. It also received Round One of a Texas Historical Commission Courthouse Preservation Grant in 2000, shortly before its restoration began; this grant program was an initiative of then-Governor George W. Bush, who personally toured the Hopkins County Courthouse in October 1998 while the program was still a proposal.

The courthouse also won the East Texas Historical Association's Lucille Terry Historical Preservation Award in 2005. In December 2013, County Line Magazine awarded the building the honor of "Best County Courthouse" in its annual "Best of the Upper East Side of Texas" survey, the third time it had received this designation.

== See also ==
- List of county courthouses in Texas
- National Register of Historic Places listings in Hopkins County, Texas
- Recorded Texas Historic Landmarks in Hopkins County
