= Gafford, Texas =

Unincorporated community in Texas, US

Coordinates: 33°09′52″N 95°41′42″W

Gafford is an unincorporated community in Hopkins County, Texas, United States. It is also known as Gafford (or Gafford's) Chapel. It was named for Thomas Mayfield Gafford (1849-1927), who deeded land for a church there in 1881. The Gafford Chapel Cemetery is the burial place of many of the pioneers of Hopkins County.

The coordinates of Gafford are 33.165 N, 95.695 W. It is located just off State Highway 11, a few miles northwest of Sulphur Springs.
