= Tira, Texas =

- Town
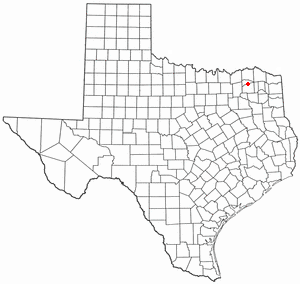
- Location of Tira, Texas

- Coordinates: 33°19′36″N 95°34′11″W
- Country: United States
- State: Texas
- County: Hopkins

Area
  - Total: 1.44 sq mi (3.73 km^{2})
  - Land: 1.42 sq mi (3.67 km^{2})
  - Water: 0.023 sq mi (0.06 km^{2})
- Elevation: 469 ft (143 m)

Population (2020)
  - Total: 319
  - Density: 225/sq mi (86.9/km^{2})
- Time zone: UTC-6 (Central (CST))
  - Summer (DST): UTC-5 (CDT)
- ZIP code: 75482
- Area codes: 903, 430
- FIPS code: 48-73124
- GNIS feature ID: 1380666

Tira is a town in Hopkins County, Texas, United States. The population was 319 at the 2020 census.

== Geography ==
Tira is located in northern Hopkins County at 33°19′36″N 95°34′11″W (33.326629, –95.569853). Texas State Highway 19 runs through the western part of the town, leading north 25 miles (40 km) to Paris and south 13 miles (21 km) to Sulphur Springs, the Hopkins county seat. Tira is 1 mile (1.6 km) east of the dam at the outlet of Jim Chapman Lake (formerly known as Cooper Lake) and is 9 miles (14 km) by road northeast of the South Sulphur Unit of Cooper State Park.

According to the United States Census Bureau, the town has a total area of 1.4 square miles (3.7 km^{2}), of which 0.02 square miles (0.06 km^{2}), or 1.65%, are water.

== Demographics ==
Historical population
Census	Pop.	Note	%±
1980	249		—
1990	237		−4.8%
2000	248		4.6%
2010	297		19.8%
2020	319		7.4%
U.S. Decennial Census

Tira racial composition as of 2020 (NH = Non-Hispanic) (Note: Note: the US Census treats Hispanic/Latino as an ethnic category. This table excludes Latinos from the racial categories and assigns them to a separate category. Hispanics/Latinos can be of any race.)
Race	Number	Percentage
White (NH)	274	85.89%
Black or African American (NH)	9	2.82%
Native American or Alaska Native (NH)	2	0.63%
Asian (NH)	1	0.31%
Mixed/Multi-Racial (NH)	10	3.13%
Hispanic or Latino	23	7.21%
Total	319	

As of the 2020 United States census, there were 319 people, 115 households, and 80 families residing in the town.

== Education ==
Tira is served by the North Hopkins Independent School District.
