= Saltillo Independent School District =

School district in Texas

Location
- Saltillo, Texas United States

District information
- Type: Public School
- Grades: PK-12
- Superintendent: Jarret Wilson

Students and staff
- Athletic conference: UIL Class A
- District mascot: Lions
- Colors: Blue & Gold

Saltillo Independent School District (Saltillo ISD) is a public school district based in the community of Saltillo, Texas (USA).

Located in east central Hopkins County, the district extends into a small portion of Franklin County.

Saltillo ISD has one school that serves students in grades Pre-Kindergarten though twelve.

In 2009, the school district was rated "recognized" by the Texas Education Agency.

== Athletics ==
The Saltillo Lions compete in the following sports -

Cross Country, Basketball, Baseball, Softball, and Track and Field

=== State Titles ===
- Boys Cross Country -
  - 2016(1A), 2022(1A)

==== State Finalists ====
- Girls Basketball -
  - 2001(1A/D2), 2013(1A/D2), 2025(1A/D2), 2026(1A/D2)
