= Texas State Highway NASA Road 1 =

State highway in Texas

State Highway NASA Road 1
- NASA Road 1 highlighted in red

Route information
- Maintained by TxDOT
- Length: 7.474 mi (12.028 km)
- Existed: 1965–present

Major junctions
- West end: I-45 at Webster
- East end: SH 146 at Seabrook

Location
- Country: United States
- State: Texas

Highway system
- Highways in Texas; Interstate; US; State; Former; Toll; Loops; Spurs; FM/RM; Park; Rec
← FM 4000	→ SH OSR

State Highway NASA Road 1 (also NASA Parkway and NASA Road 1) is an east–west state highway that runs from Interstate 45 (I-45) in Webster to State Highway 146/future State Highway 99 (SH 146/future SH 99) in Seabrook. The highway is a six- to eight-lane divided highway for most of its length. A portion of the road is a four-lane controlled-access highway that bypasses the central businesses of Webster. The highway is the main route to NASA's Lyndon B. Johnson Space Center. It is one of only two Texas state highways with an official designation beginning with a letter; the other is SH OSR.

== History ==
The highway was originally designated as Farm to Market Road 528 (FM 528) in 1945, but upon the opening of Johnson Space Center, the portion of FM 528 from I-45 to SH 146 was redesignated as NASA Road 1.

== Route description ==
NASA Road 1 begins at I-45 in Webster and heads towards the northeast through Webster intersecting SH 3 and FM 270. The highway passes along the southern boundary of the Johnson Space Center and provides access to the center. The highway follows the north shore of Clear Lake and ends at SH 146/future SH 99 in Seabrook.

NASA 1 Bypass Freeway is a freeway that passes to the south of Webster. It is 2.7 miles (4.3 km) long and has four lanes. The contract for construction was awarded in 2004 and it opened in December 2008. The freeway consists of two direct access ramps which are convenient for travelers coming to and from Houston. One of these ramps provides southbound travelers from I-45 with direct access to the bypass (flying over I-45 in a three-tier stack configuration), and the other provides travelers with the opportunity to merge onto I-45 northbound without encountering any traffic signals. Motorists coming from Galveston (I-45 northbound) have to encounter a traffic signal at Kobayashi Road before experiencing the uninterrupted flow of the freeway. The freeway bypasses much of the congestion in inner-city Webster, giving easy access to Johnson Space Center.

== Major junctions ==
The entire route is in Harris County.

Location	mi	km	Destinations	Notes
Webster	0.0	0.0	I-45 north – Houston	I-45 exit 25; western terminus; direct access to northbound I-45
Webster	0.3	0.48	Kobayashi Road I-45 south – Galveston	Westbound exit; access to southbound I-45 via frontage road
Webster	1.0	1.6	SH 3	Eastbound exit and westbound entrance
Webster	1.9	3.1	FM 270 (Egret Bay Boulevard) / NASA Parkway / El Camino Real	Eastbound exit and entrance
Webster	1.9	3.1	To SH 3 / Sarah Deel Drive / NASA Parkway	Westbound exit and entrance
Webster	2.4	3.9	FM 270 (Egret Bay Boulevard) / El Camino Real	Westbound exit and entrance; east end of freeway
Houston–Nassau Bay line	3.1	5.0	Point Lookout Drive	Access to Space Center Houston
Houston–Nassau Bay line	3.2	5.1	Saturn Lane	Access to Johnson Space Center
Houston–Nassau Bay line	4.5	7.2	Space Center Boulevard	
Taylor Lake Village	5.7	9.2	Kirby Boulevard	
Seabrook	6.8	10.9	Repsdorph Road	
Seabrook	8.0	12.9	SH 146	Interchange; eastern terminus; SH 146 is planned to be co-signed with SH 99 in the future
1.000 mi = 1.609 km; 1.000 km = 0.621 mi: Incomplete access
