= Bay Area Christian School =

Location
- 4800 W Main St. League City, Galveston County, Texas 77573; United States; 29.4944065°N 95.1508214°W

Information
- Former name: First Baptist School of League City
- Type: Private
- Denomination: Baptist
- Founded: 1973
- NCES School ID: 01328619
- Head of school: Les Rainey
- Faculty: 61.1
- Teaching staff: 76.6 (FTE)
- Grades: PK–12
- Enrollment: 897 (2019–20)
- Student to teacher ratio: 9.7
- Hours in school day: 7
- Colors: Red and Blue
- Athletics conference: 4A
- Mascot: Bronco
- Nickname: Broncs
- Rival: LSA
- Website: www.bacschool.org
- Last updated: 27 June 2023

Bay Area Christian School (BACS) is a Christian K-12 school in League City, Texas in Greater Houston. It is a ministry of the Bay Area First Baptist Church.

== History ==
The First Baptist Christian School of League City opened in 1973. In 1978 it had 230 students, an increase from its previous figures. In 1985 the school received its current name.

Beginning in 1992 the school began to use waiting lists for enrollment. In 1995 the current gymnasium and field house were completed. In 2005 the current elementary school building opened. In 2009 the school had over 700 students. In 2010 the current high school building opened.

== Demographics ==
As of 2015 it has 785 students, including 472 in grades K-6 and 313 in grades 7-12. Students originate from several communities including League City, Alvin, Clear Lake, Dickinson, Friendswood, and southern Houston.
