= Nicholas Richard Long =

American businessman and politician

Nick Long

Mayor of League City, Texas
- Incumbent
- Assumed office November 2022
- Preceded by: Pat Hallisey

Member of the League City Council
- In office November 2014 – November 2022

Personal details
- Born: Nicholas Richard Long; January 7, 1983 (age 43) League City, Texas, U.S.
- Party: Republican
- Spouse: Kari Long
- Children: 2
- Education: University of Texas at Austin (BBA, MBA)
- Occupation: Businessman, politician

Nicholas Richard Long (born January 7, 1983) is an American businessman and politician who has served as the mayor of League City, Texas, since 2022. A member of the Republican Party, Long previously served on the League City Council from 2014 to 2022.

== Early life and education ==
Long was raised in League City, Texas, and graduated from Clear Creek High School in 2001. He earned a Bachelor of Business Administration (BBA) in finance from the McCombs School of Business at the University of Texas at Austin in 2005. He later earned a Master of Business Administration (MBA) in finance from the McCombs School of Business in 2013.

== Career ==
=== Business career ===
In 2010, Long co-founded the Garza Long Group, a benefits consulting firm based in Texas. He has remained active in business alongside his public service career.

=== Political career ===
==== League City Council (2014–2022) ====
Long was elected to the League City Council in 2014, winning the Position 7 seat with approximately 82 percent of the vote, defeating Abdul Alsahli. During his tenure, he served on the city's Finance Committee and the Houston–Galveston Area Council Transportation and Infrastructure Committee. He was re-elected in 2018 with about 62 percent of the vote, defeating Ange Mertens. As a council member, Long focused on fiscal and infrastructure policy issues, including property tax rates and municipal finance.

==== Mayor of League City (2022–present) ====
Long was elected mayor of League City in November 2022, running unopposed. As mayor, he has supported initiatives related to public safety, infrastructure improvements, and financial management. He represents the city on the Houston–Galveston Area Council Board of Directors and the Bay Area Houston Economic Partnership (BAHEP) Mayors Council.

== Political involvement ==
Long has been active in Republican Party politics since his college years. He volunteered for Governor Rick Perry’s re-election campaign in 2002 and worked with the Republican National Committee’s 72-hour grassroots program in 2004 and 2006. He has served as a delegate to several Texas Republican State Conventions and sits on the advisory board of the Republican Mayors Association.

== Personal life ==
Long is married to Kari Long. The couple has two children and resides in League City, Texas.
