= H. L. "Hub" Hollis Field =

Baseball venue in Paris, Texas, US

- Interactive map of H. L. "Hub" Hollis Field
- Full name: H. L. "Hub" Hollis Field
- Location: Paris, Texas
- Coordinates: 33.64504°N 95.53068°W
- Capacity: 1,000
- Surface: Tiff Bermuda
- Field size: 330 LF; 370 LCF; 390 CF; 370 RCF; 330 RF

Tenant
- Paris Junior College Dragons

H. L. "Hub" Hollis Field is a baseball venue located in Paris, Texas, and the home of the Paris Junior College Dragons baseball team. The facility is named after the school's first Athletic Director and Head Football Coach, who worked in the 1920s.
