= Birthright, Texas =

- Unincorporated community
- Location within Texas Location within the United States
- Coordinates: 33°16′20″N 95°33′54″W
- Country: United States
- State: Texas
- County: Hopkins
- Elevation: 509 ft (155 m)

Population (2000)
  - Total: 40
- Time zone: UTC-6 (Central (CST))
  - Summer (DST): UTC-5 (CDT)
- Area codes: 430 & 903
- GNIS feature ID: 1352243

Birthright, also known as Lone Star, is an unincorporated community in Hopkins County, Texas, United States. Birthright is located on Farm to Market Road 71, 10 miles (16 km) north of Sulphur Springs.

== History ==
Birthright was founded circa 1870 by E. C. Birthright, who opened a store at the site. A post office opened at Birthright in 1871; Edward McLaughlin was the first postmaster. By 1885, the community had four mill-gins, three churches, and the Lone Star School. A newspaper called the Lone Star Appeal was being printed in Birthright by 1890, at which time its population was 250. The population fell to 85 by 1925, and the school closed between the 1930s and 1948. By the 1960s, the post office and the remaining stores had closed, and all that remained of Birthright was two churches and several homes. In 1990 and 2000, Birthright had a population of 40.

== Education ==
The community of Birthright is served by the North Hopkins Independent School District and home to the North Hopkins High School Panthers.

== Notable people ==
- Forrest Gregg, National Football League Hall of Fame player and coach
- Tex Shirley, Major League Baseball player
