= KPIT (FM) =

- Pittsburg, Texas; United States
- Broadcast area: Mount Pleasant, Texas
- Frequency: 91.7 MHz

Programming
- Language: English

Ownership
- Owner: Holdsworth Educational Media, Inc.

History
- First air date: July 11, 2008
- Call sign meaning: Pittsburg

Technical information
- Licensing authority: FCC
- Facility ID: 176468
- Class: A
- ERP: 450 watts
- HAAT: 39.8 meters (131 ft)
- Transmitter coordinates: 33°2′45.50″N 95°3′23.20″W

Links
- Public license information: Public file; LMS

KPIT (91.7 FM) is a radio station licensed to Pittsburg, Texas, United States, which serves Mount Pleasant and Titus County. The station is currently owned by Holdsworth Educational Media, Inc.

== History ==
KPIT was first proposed by the Millennium Broadcasting Corporation in November 2007, and receiving a permit to construct the Class A facility on December 31, 2007. The facility was originally proposed to operate at 500 watts, 39.81 meters elevation, from a transmission site just south of Lake Bob Sandlin, but decreased ERP to the current 450 watts in a subsequent application prior to sign on. KPIT has used the same transmission site near the lake since inception, which allows the signal to serve both its COL of Pittsburg, as well as the larger town of Mount Pleasant.

KPIT used a relay translator, licensed as K265DW Mount Pleasant, in order to expand coverage of La Campeona into the eastern parts of Mount Pleasant where KPIT's Class A signal can not reliably reach.

K265DW was originally built as a relay translator for KETE Sulphur Bluff, Texas airing a Christian Contemporary format branded as "Way-FM", but was silenced for nearly a year, before changing to rebroadcasting KPIT as its primary feed after the sale of KETE from The Way Radio Group back to North Texas Radio Group, L.P., which did not include the Mount Pleasant translator, as North Texas Radio Group already owned it, having not included the translator in the original divestiture of KETE. KETE was then taken silent after the return acquisition, in order to increase power and expand coverage.

On December 11, 2008, Millennium Broadcasting sold KPIT to Jabella Broadcasting. The sale was consummated on December 15. KPIT would change programming to the current Spanish Religious format accordingly, having begun its life as a Gospel station.

On September 27, 2018, Jabella Broadcasting filed for a transfer of license for the facility, after an agreement was made to sell the station to Holdsworth Educational Media, Inc. for $25,000. The proposed sale is for KPIT only, and does not include K265DW, which remains licensed to and owned by North Texas Radio Group. The sale was consummated on November 23, 2018.
