= Como-Pickton Consolidated Independent School District =

2A School District in Texas

Location
- Como, Texas United States

District information
- Type: Public
- Grades: Pre-K through 12
- Established: 1965
- Superintendent: Lydia Walden

Students and staff
- Athletic conference: UIL Class AA
- District mascot: War Eagle
- Colors: Columbia Blue, Black, White

Other information
- Website: www.cpcisd.net

Como-Pickton Consolidated Independent School District is a public school district based in Como, Texas (USA). Located in Hopkins County, a very small portion of the district extends into Wood County.

In 2009, the school district was rated "academically acceptable" by the Texas Education Agency.

== Schools ==
Como-Pickton Consolidated ISD operates three schools:

- Como-Pickton High School (Grades 9-12)
- Como-Pickton Junior High (Grades 6-8)
- Como-Pickton Elementary School (Grades PK-5)

== High school ==
Serving grades 9-12, Como-Pickton High School has various clubs & organizations that include: National Honor Society, Student Council, FCCLA, SkillsUSA, Spanish Club, FFA, Robotics, and One-Act Play.

The school district was voted by readers of the Sulphur Springs News-Telegram as the best Public School in Hopkins County in 2019, 2020, 2021, and 2022.

== Athletics ==
The Como-Pickton Eagles compete in the following sports:

Cross Country, Volleyball, Football, Basketball, Powerlifting, Baseball, Softball, and Track and Field.

=== State Finalists ===
- Softball
  - 2023 (2A)
