= Texas State Highway 96 =

State highway in Texas

State Highway 96
- League City Parkway
- SH 96 highlighted in red

Route information
- Maintained by TxDOT
- Length: 6.45 mi (10.38 km)
- Existed: 1994–present

Major junctions
- West end: I-45 at League City
- SH 3 at League City
- East end: SH 146 at Kemah

Location
- Country: United States
- State: Texas
- Counties: Galveston

Highway system
- Highways in Texas; Interstate; US; State; Former; Toll; Loops; Spurs; FM/RM; Park; Rec
← US 96	→ SH 97

State Highway 96 (SH 96), also known as League City Parkway, is a state highway in the U.S. state of Texas. The highway runs approximately 6.5 miles (10.5 km) between Interstate 45 and SH 146/future SH 99 in Galveston County, connecting the cities of League City and Kemah.

== Route description ==
SH 96 begins in League City at I-45, just south of the Harris County line. From here, the highway travels to the east, crossing SH 3. It then passes over the Union Pacific Railroad line and has an incomplete interchange with the parallel Dickinson Avenue; access to the street is available from westbound SH 96 only, while traffic on the street can enter only eastbound SH 96. The route then crosses FM 270 before turning to the northeast, passing the site of the former Houston Gulf Airport. After intersections with several other surface streets, including the Columbia Memorial Parkway, SH 96 ends at SH 146/future SH 99 at the city line between League City and Kemah.

== History ==
SH 96 was designated along its current route on April 28, 1994.

The SH 96 designation was previously used on a route from Raymondville to Harlingen, mainly along the Gulf Coast, beginning on June 16, 1924. On February 22, 1928, it was extended north to the Kenedy County line. On March 19, 1930, a section from Chapman Ranch to Corpus Christi was added, replacing that section of SH 57 and creating a gap. On April 1, 1931, the sections were connected. On August 3, 1932, the connecting section was to go through Rivera. The connecting section was finally added to the state highway log on November 30, 1932. On April 19, 1935, SH 96 was rerouted to go through Bishop. On July 15, 1935, the section from Chapman Ranch to Bishop was cancelled as it was never built. The route was truncated to Robstown on September 26, 1939, with an already-constructed section between Corpus Christi and Chapman Ranch transferred to SH 286. SH 96 was instead extended to Sinton, replacing a portion of SH 44. This was redesignated as US 77 on June 30, 1945 when that route was extended south.

A section of FM 1266 shared a concurrency with SH 96, providing access to FM 646 to the south and FM 518 to the north. This concurrency was removed on May 29, 2003 when sections of FM 1266 within League City were returned to the city's jurisdiction.

== Major intersections ==
The entire route is in Galveston County.

Location	mi	km	Destinations	Notes
League City			I-45 (Gulf Freeway) – Galveston, Houston	I-45 exit 22; western terminus.
League City			West Walker Street	
League City			SH 3 – Dickinson, Webster	
League City			Dickinson Avenue	Interchange; westbound exit and eastbound entrance
League City			FM 270 (South Egret Bay Boulevard)	
League City			Louisiana Avenue	
League City			Tuscan Lakes Boulevard	Former west end of FM 1266 concurrency
League City			South Shore Boulevard	
League City			Columbia Memorial Parkway	Former east end of FM 1266 concurrency
League City			Lawrence Road	
Kemah			SH 146 – Texas City, Houston	Eastern terminus; at Kemah–League City city line, SH 146 is planned to be co-signed with SH 99 in the future
1.000 mi = 1.609 km; 1.000 km = 0.621 mi: Incomplete access
