= Cumby Independent School District =

School district in Texas

Cumby Collegiate Independent School District

Location
- Cumby, Texas United States

District information
- Type: Public School
- Grades: PK-12
- Superintendent: Shelly Slaughter

Students and staff
- Athletic conference: UIL Class AA
- District mascot: Trojans
- Colors: Maroon & White

Cumby Collegiate Independent School District is a public school district based in Cumby, Texas (USA). It serves sections of Hopkins County and Hunt County.

In 2009, the school district was rated "academically acceptable" by the Texas Education Agency.

In 2022, the school district changed from Cumby ISD to Cumby Collegiate ISD.

== Schools ==
Cumby Collegiate ISD operates three schools:

- Cumby Collegiate High School (Grades 8-12)
- Cumby Collegiate Middle School (Grades 3-7)
- Cumby Collegiate Elementary School (Grades PK-2)

== See also ==
- List of school districts in Texas
