= League City, Texas =

- City
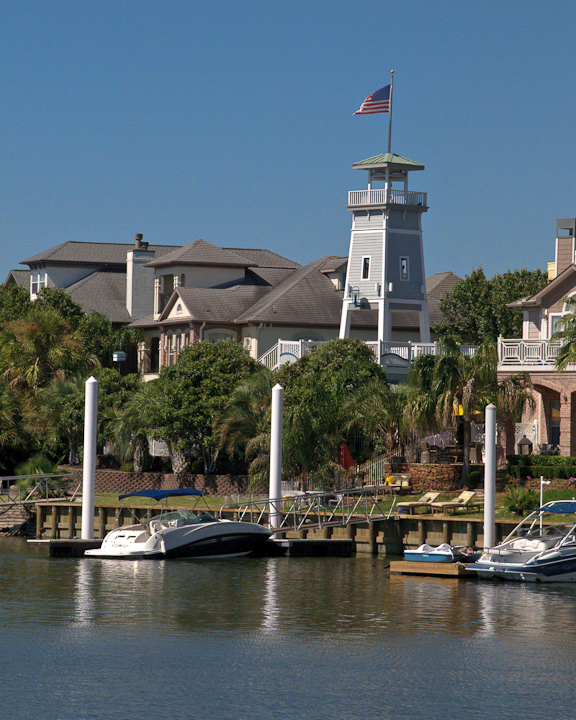
- South Shore Harbor

- Flag

- Location in Galveston County, Texas

- Location within Texas Location within the United States
- Coordinates: 29°30′27″N 95°5′43″W
- Country: United States
- State: Texas
- Counties: Galveston, Harris
- Incorporated: 1962

Government
  - Type: Council–manager
  - Mayor: Nick Long
  - City Manager: John Baumgartner

Area
  - City: 53.13 sq mi (137.61 km^{2})
  - Land: 51.36 sq mi (133.03 km^{2})
  - Water: 1.77 sq mi (4.58 km^{2})
- Elevation: 20 ft (6 m)

Population (2020)
  - City: 114,392
  - Estimate (2025): 119,905
  - Rank: US: 254th TX: 36th
  - Density: 2,247/sq mi (867.7/km^{2})
  - Urban: 191,863 (US: 200th)
  - Urban density: 1,760/sq mi (679.7/km^{2})
- Time zone: UTC–6 (Central (CST))
  - Summer (DST): UTC–5 (CDT)
- ZIP Codes: 77573, 77574
- Area codes: 713, 281, 832, 346, 621
- FIPS code: 48-41980
- GNIS feature ID: 1339753
- Website: leaguecitytx.gov

League City is a city primarily in Galveston County, Texas, United States. It has a small portion north of Clear Creek within Harris County zoned for residential and commercial uses. The population was 114,392 at the 2020 census. It is part of the Greater Houston metropolitan area.

League City is home to several waterside resorts, such as South Shore Harbor Resort and Conference Center and Waterford Harbor and Yacht Club Marina, popular with residents of nearby Houston. Between 2000 and 2005, League City surpassed Galveston as Galveston County's largest city.

== History ==
League City was settled at the former site of a Karankawa Indian village. Three families, the Butlers, the Cowarts, and the Perkinses, are considered to be the founding families of the city. The Winfield Family has also recently been acknowledged as a founding family by the City Government. The Cowart family settled on a creek now called Cowart's Creek after them (now often called "Coward's Creek"). The Perkins family built on a creek notably lined with magnolia trees and named it Magnolia Bayou. The Butler family settled inland. The Winfield Family purchased land in League City from the great nephew of Stephen F. Austin and moved there, to a place near what is now Hobbs Road.

The first resident of the town proper, George W. Butler, arrived from Louisiana in 1854 and settled at the junction of Clear Creek and Chigger Bayou. The area was known as Butler's Ranch or Clear Creek until J. C. League acquired the land from a man named Muldoon on his entering the priesthood. In 1859, the Galveston, Houston, and Henderson Railroad was completed, passing through League City. This began a small feud over the name, as Butler was the postmaster. The name was changed several times, alternating between Clear Creek and the new League City. In the end, League City was chosen.

In 1907, League had two railroad flatcars of live oak trees left by the railroad tracks. These were for the residents to plant on their property. Butler and his son Milby supervised the planting of these trees, now known as the Butler Oaks. Many of them line Main Street to this day.

Starting in the early 1970s, the bodies of 30 murdered women were discovered in Galveston County, with 4 being discovered in League City, and more have gone missing from the same area. This location has become known as the Texas Killing Fields.

In the 2000s, rising real estate costs in Galveston forced many families to move to other areas, including League City. This meant an influx of children out of Galveston ISD and into other school districts like Clear Creek ISD and Dickinson ISD.

== Geography ==
League City is located 23 miles (37 km) southeast of Houston, and the same distance northwest of Galveston.

According to the United States Census Bureau, the city has a total area of 53.13 square miles (137.61 km^{2}), of which 51.36 square miles (133.02 km^{2}) is land and 1.77 square miles (4.58 km^{2}), or 3.22%, is water.

=== Climate ===
As with the rest of the Houston area, League City features a humid subtropical climate (Köppen: Cfa) characterized by hot, humid summers and generally mild winters.

Climate data for League City, Texas (Houston NWSO), 1991-2020 normals, extremes 1990-present
Month	Jan	Feb	Mar	Apr	May	Jun	Jul	Aug	Sep	Oct	Nov	Dec	Year
Record high °F (°C)	84 (29)	86 (30)	92 (33)	93 (34)	97 (36)	103 (39)	101 (38)	107 (42)	106 (41)	96 (36)	88 (31)	85 (29)	107 (42)
Mean maximum °F (°C)	77.3 (25.2)	79.7 (26.5)	82.8 (28.2)	86.1 (30.1)	90.7 (32.6)	94.5 (34.7)	96.4 (35.8)	97.7 (36.5)	94.6 (34.8)	89.9 (32.2)	83.5 (28.6)	79.7 (26.5)	98.5 (36.9)
Mean daily maximum °F (°C)	63.8 (17.7)	67.4 (19.7)	73.0 (22.8)	78.4 (25.8)	85.0 (29.4)	90.0 (32.2)	91.8 (33.2)	92.3 (33.5)	88.4 (31.3)	81.7 (27.6)	72.5 (22.5)	65.8 (18.8)	79.2 (26.2)
Daily mean °F (°C)	54.8 (12.7)	58.6 (14.8)	64.3 (17.9)	69.8 (21.0)	77.0 (25.0)	82.4 (28.0)	83.9 (28.8)	84.1 (28.9)	80.1 (26.7)	72.1 (22.3)	62.9 (17.2)	56.6 (13.7)	70.6 (21.4)
Mean daily minimum °F (°C)	45.7 (7.6)	49.8 (9.9)	55.6 (13.1)	61.3 (16.3)	69.1 (20.6)	74.7 (23.7)	76.0 (24.4)	75.9 (24.4)	71.8 (22.1)	62.6 (17.0)	53.4 (11.9)	47.4 (8.6)	61.9 (16.6)
Mean minimum °F (°C)	27.8 (−2.3)	32.1 (0.1)	35.9 (2.2)	43.3 (6.3)	54.8 (12.7)	66.6 (19.2)	69.8 (21.0)	70.0 (21.1)	59.8 (15.4)	44.7 (7.1)	35.1 (1.7)	30.0 (−1.1)	26.3 (−3.2)
Record low °F (°C)	18 (−8)	15 (−9)	23 (−5)	37 (3)	43 (6)	57 (14)	62 (17)	60 (16)	50 (10)	29 (−2)	26 (−3)	16 (−9)	15 (−9)
Average precipitation inches (mm)	4.80 (122)	3.02 (77)	3.30 (84)	4.22 (107)	5.12 (130)	6.54 (166)	4.36 (111)	6.64 (169)	7.34 (186)	5.79 (147)	4.54 (115)	4.53 (115)	60.20 (1,529)
Average snowfall inches (cm)	0.0 (0.0)	0.0 (0.0)	0.0 (0.0)	0.0 (0.0)	0.0 (0.0)	0.0 (0.0)	0.0 (0.0)	0.0 (0.0)	0.0 (0.0)	0.0 (0.0)	0.0 (0.0)	0.2 (0.51)	0.2 (0.51)
Average precipitation days (≥ 0.1 inch)	6.2	4.8	4.2	4.3	5.0	7.0	6.3	6.9	7.4	5.5	5.1	5.9	68.6
Average snowy days (≥ 0.1 inch)	0.0	0.0	0.0	0.0	0.0	0.0	0.0	0.0	0.0	0.0	0.0	0.0	0
Source: NOAA

== Demographics ==
Historical population
Census	Pop.	Note	%±
1950	1,341		—
1960	2,622		95.5%
1970	10,818		312.6%
1980	16,578		53.2%
1990	30,159		81.9%
2000	45,444		50.7%
2010	83,560		83.9%
2020	114,392		36.9%
2025 (est.)	119,905		4.8%
U.S. Decennial Census; Texas Almanac: 1850-2000; 2020 Census

=== Racial and ethnic composition ===
League City, Texas – Racial and ethnic composition Note: the US Census treats Hispanic/Latino as an ethnic category. This table excludes Latinos from the racial categories and assigns them to a separate category. Hispanics/Latinos may be of any race.
Race / Ethnicity (NH = Non-Hispanic)	Pop 2000	Pop 2010	Pop 2020	% 2000	% 2010	% 2020
White alone (NH)	34,807	56,977	69,425	76.59%	68.19%	60.69%
Black or African American alone (NH)	2,297	5,791	8,317	5.05%	6.93%	7.27%
Native American or Alaska Native alone (NH)	128	246	286	0.28%	0.29%	0.25%
Asian alone (NH)	1,419	4,453	7,122	3.12%	5.33%	6.23%
Native Hawaiian or Pacific Islander alone (NH)	21	42	65	0.05%	0.05%	0.06%
Other race alone (NH)	63	146	602	0.14%	0.17%	0.53%
Mixed race or Multiracial (NH)	579	1,459	4,691	1.27%	1.75%	4.10%
Hispanic or Latino (any race)	6,130	14,446	23,884	13.49%	17.29%	20.88%
Total	45,444	83,560	114,392	100.00%	100.00%	100.00%

=== 2020 census ===
As of the 2020 census, League City had a population of 114,392; the median age was 37.1 years, with 26.1% of residents under the age of 18 and 12.2% 65 years of age or older. For every 100 females there were 95.5 males, and for every 100 females age 18 and over there were 93.0 males.

The census counted 41,352 households, including 30,430 families; 39.4% had children under the age of 18, 58.4% were married-couple households, 14.5% were households with a male householder and no spouse or partner present, 21.4% were households with a female householder and no spouse or partner present, 21.6% were individuals living alone, and 7.2% had someone living alone who was 65 years of age or older.

There were 43,493 housing units, of which 4.9% were vacant; the homeowner vacancy rate was 1.3% and the rental vacancy rate was 9.2%.

99.6% of residents lived in urban areas, while 0.4% lived in rural areas.

Racial composition as of the 2020 census
Race	Number	Percent
White	75,705	66.2%
Black or African American	8,533	7.5%
American Indian and Alaska Native	586	0.5%
Asian	7,255	6.3%
Native Hawaiian and Other Pacific Islander	88	0.1%
Some other race	6,448	5.6%
Two or more races	15,777	13.8%
Hispanic or Latino (of any race)	23,884	20.9%

== Arts and culture ==
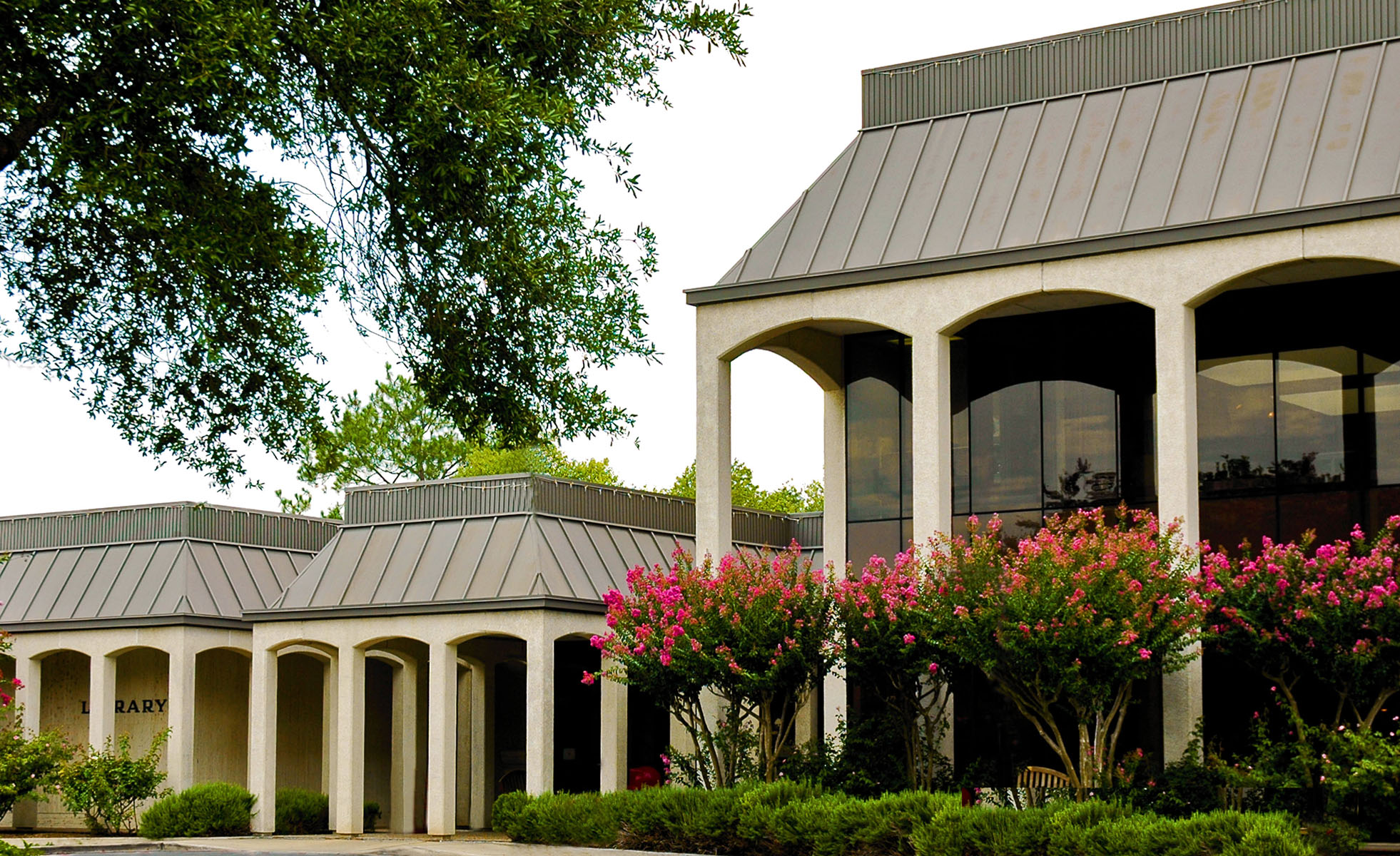
Helen Hall Library in League City

The Helen Hall Library, a member of the Galveston County Library System, is operated by the city and located at 100 West Walker Street. The League City Public Library was renamed after Hall in 1985. During that year a $2.5 million bond to expand the 7,000-square-foot (650 m^{2}) library passed. The library received a two-story adult services wing and a renovation of the original structure, which housed the children's and audio-visual services sections; the projects were completed by 1988. As of 2008 Hall, with 29,000 square feet (2,700 m^{2}) of space, is the largest and busiest unit of the Galveston County Library System.

Circa 2019, the library's history club began operations. It meets once per month. As of 2021, according to the librarian specializing in history, Caris Brown, the history club had a number of people going to meetings despite the effect of the COVID-19 pandemic in Texas.

In 2022, two League City city council members created a resolution which would have a board of 15 people decide whether content is obscene, and if so, prevent the library from having tax dollars to house said material ruled obscene.

== Parks and recreation ==
The 38,000-square-foot (3,500 m^{2}) Perry Family YMCA is located at 1701 League City Parkway. The branch, which cost US$10.7 million to build was named after Bob Perry, a homebuilder who donated $1 million. The North Galveston County YMCA began in 1993 and later moved into the Perry YMCA. John P. McGovern and his wife, Katherine, donated the 17-acre (69,000 m^{2}) site used for the Perry YMCA.

Hometown Heroes Park is a public community park covering 28.71 acres that includes a recreation center, basketball/volleyball courts, competition size swimming pool, and sports fields.

== Government ==
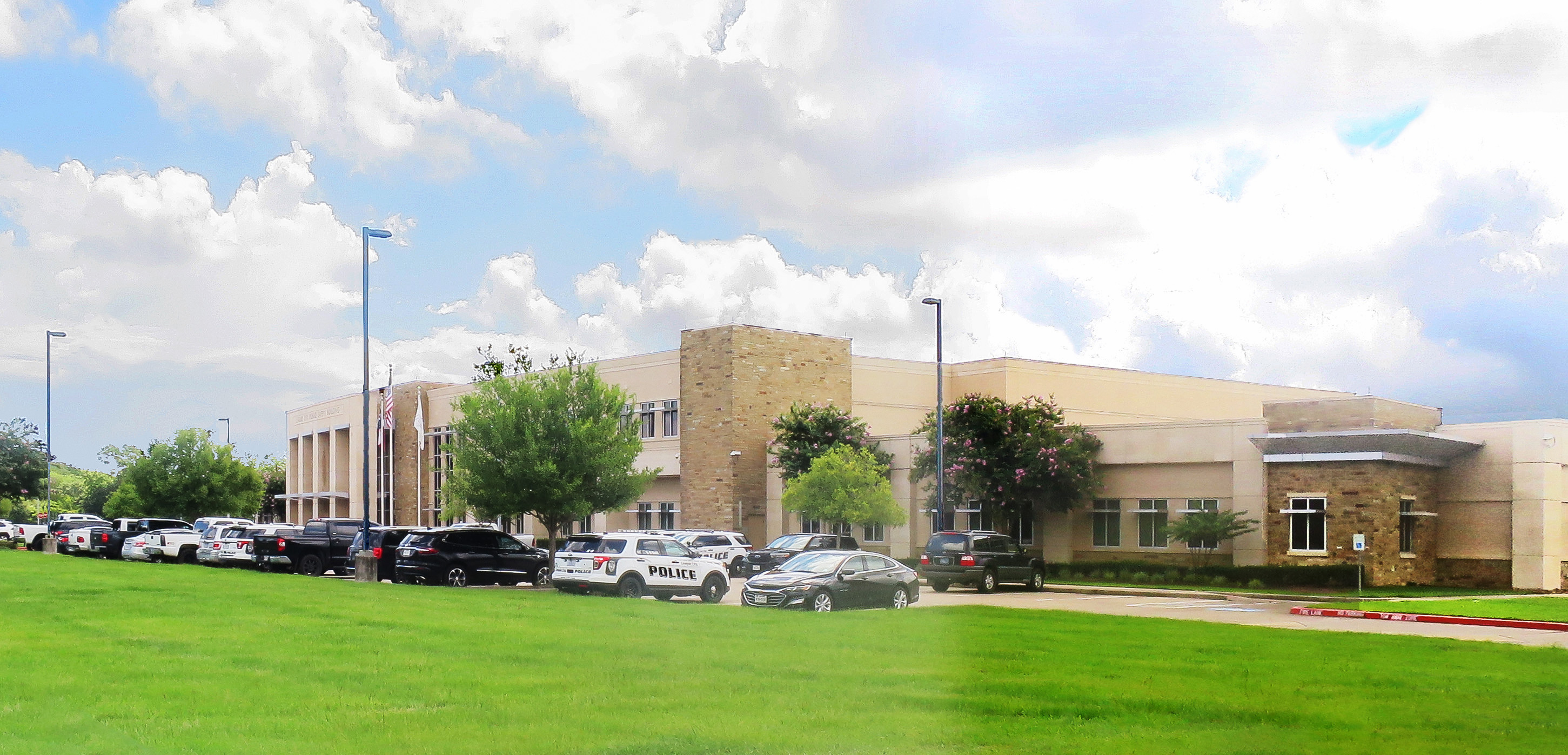
League City, Texas Police Department

League City became an incorporated city in 1962. League City's government consists of seven council members and the mayor. The mayor is a full voting member of the council. The city's charter is purported to be a strong mayor form of government, but this issue has been debated for years. By ordinance, a city administrator position was created under Mayor Leonard Cruse. The ordinance was amended in May 2010 to create a council-manager government. According to the ordinance, "...shall consist of a mayor and council members, elected by the people and responsible to the people, and a city manager, appointed by and responsible to the council for proper administration of the affairs of the city."

In 2011 an officer accused the police chief, Michael Jez, of giving officers ticket quotas, which are illegal in the state of Texas. In November city council voted to place Chief Jez on administrative leave. The council did not give a reason and Jez cited philosophical differences for the separation. Much speculation was made that the decision was a reaction to the allegation made, but neither side ever admitted to any wrongdoing.

In 2014, the police department moved to a new joint Public Safety Building that is shared with Police and Fire administration as well as housing the police department, dispatch, and the city jail. The building is across the street from the old police department that now houses other city offices that were previously in leased space. The city held an open house in January 2015 to serve as a grand opening to the public, allowing citizens to come see the inner workings of the police department.

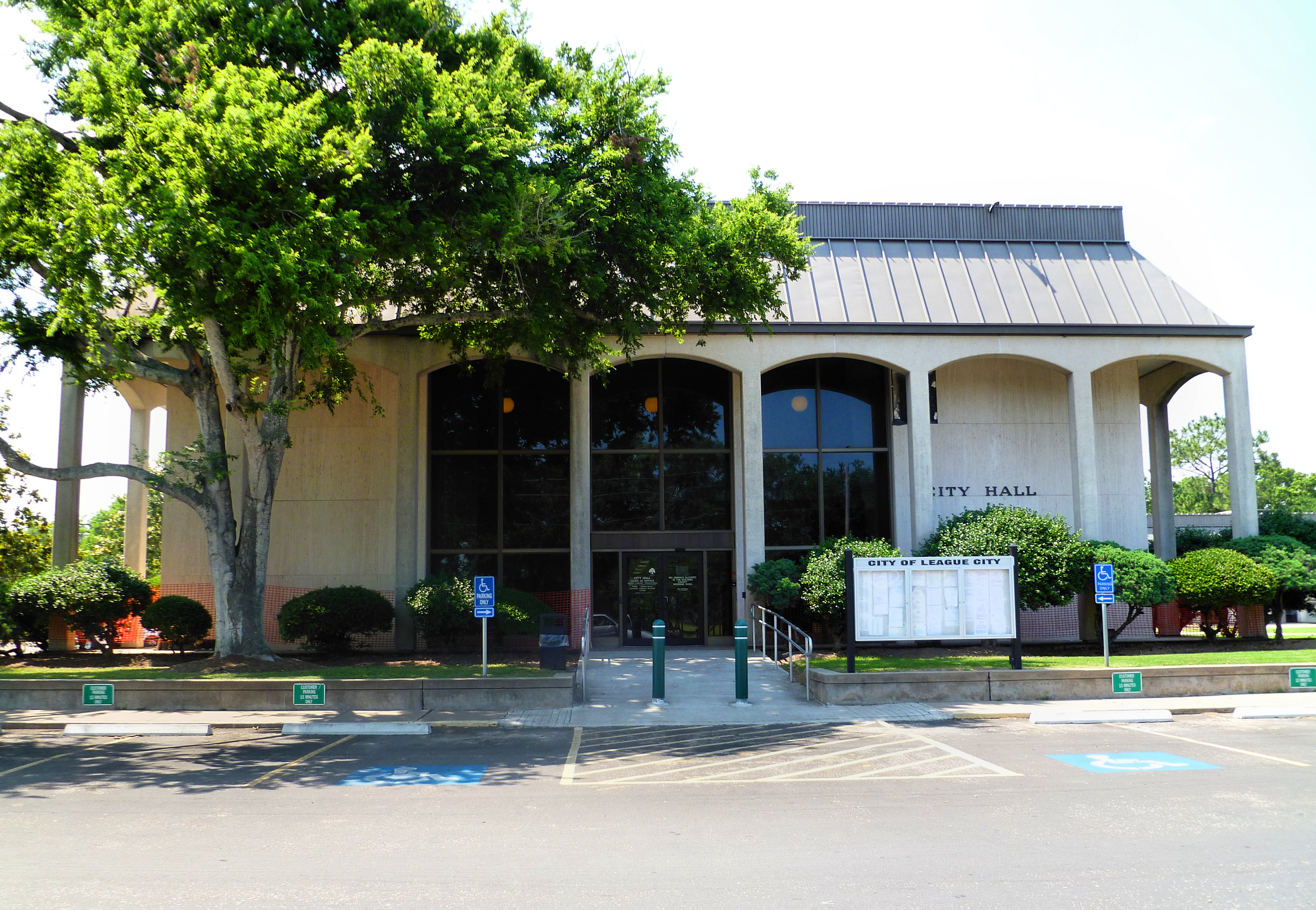
League City's City Hall

== Education ==
=== Primary and secondary schools ===
==== Public schools ====
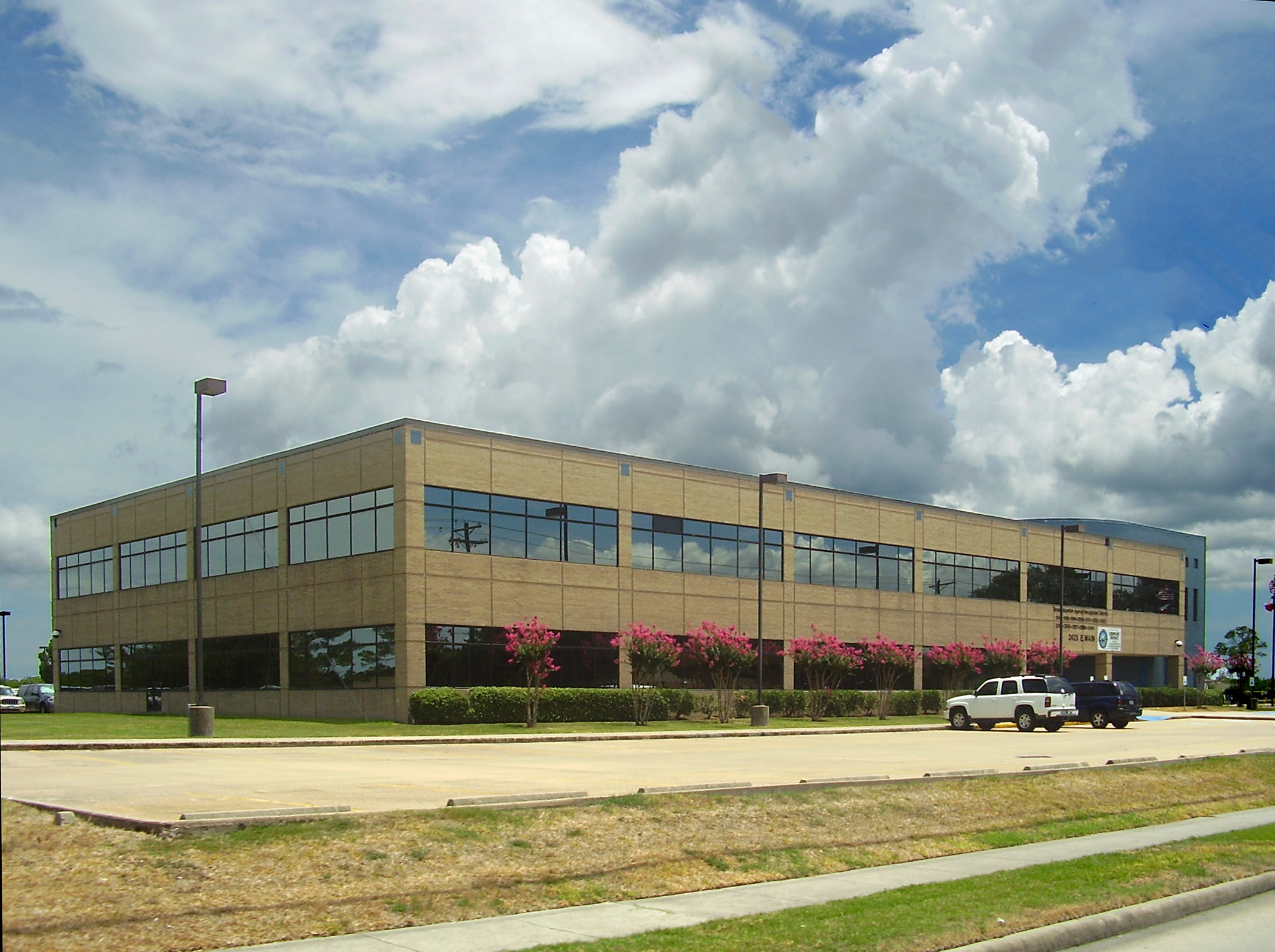
Clear Creek Independent School District headquarters

Clear Creek Independent School District is based in League City, and serves pupils in the Harris County portion and most of the Galveston County portion. Most pupils in League City attend schools in the Clear Creek Independent School District.

CCISD was established in 1948, partly from the former League City school district. League City Elementary School, Ferguson Elementary School, and Hyde Elementary School are primary schools located in League City. Bayside Intermediate, League City Intermediate, Clear Creek Intermediate, Creekside Intermediate, and Victory Lakes Intermediate are middle schools located in the city.

Clear Creek High School is located in League City. In 2007, Clear Springs High School opened in western League City. In 2010, Clear Falls High School opened in southeastern League City.

School districts serving other portions of League City in Galveston County include Dickinson Independent School District and Santa Fe Independent School District. Within League City Dickinson ISD operates Bay Colony Elementary School, Calder Road Elementary School, Louis G. Lobit Elementary School, and Eva C. Lobit Middle School. The respective comprehensive high schools of the two school districts are Dickinson High School and Santa Fe High School.

==== Private schools ====
Bay Area Christian School started in 1973 and currently has an enrollment of over 800 students from grades K to 12.

St. Mary School, a Roman Catholic K–8 school operated by the Roman Catholic Archdiocese of Galveston-Houston, is in League City.

=== Colleges and universities ===
The Galveston County portion of Clear Creek ISD and Dickinson ISD (and therefore all parts of League City in Galveston County) are served by the College of the Mainland. The Harris County portion of Clear Creek ISD (and therefore the Harris County portion of League City) is served by San Jacinto College.

It is also located within a few miles of the University of Houston Clear Lake.

== Infrastructure ==
=== Transportation ===
Houston Gulf Airport was located in eastern League City. The airport's land was sold and the land became a string of houses along Texas State Highway 96. The airport was once partially owned by the Bin Laden family with Salem Bin Laden holding interest in the airport at least until his death in 1988.

Commercial airline service for the area is operated from George Bush Intercontinental Airport and William P. Hobby Airport, which are located in Houston. League City in conjunction with Island Transit, Connect Transit, and UTMB, there is now a Park and Ride in the Victory Lakes subdivision.

=== Health care ===
In 2008 the University of Texas Medical Branch board of regents approved the creation of the 110,000-square-foot (10,000 m^{2}) Specialty Care Center facility, located on 35 acres (140,000 m^{2}) of land near Interstate 45, Farm to Market Road 646, and the Victory Lakes community.

=== Weather ===
The National Weather Service Houston/Galveston Office and the Galveston Office of Emergency Management offices share a facility in League City; the facility has a Dickinson postal address.

== Notable people ==
- Chris Sabat, voice actor
- Maddie Baillio, actress and singer
- Busby Family, family of the first-ever all-female quintuplets born in the United States
- Jarred Cosart, baseball player
- Doug Hurley, NASA astronaut
- Karen Nyberg, NASA astronaut
- Marcus Johnson, American football player
- Michael Barratt, NASA astronaut
- Braydon Fisher, baseball player
- Victor Glover, NASA astronaut

== See also ==
- Galveston Bay Area
