= Saltillo, Texas =

Unincorporated community in Texas, US

Coordinates: 33°11′04″N 95°19′35″W

Saltillo (/sælˈtɪloʊ/ sal-TIL-oh) is an unincorporated community in Hopkins County, Texas, United States. It is located 16 miles east of Sulphur Springs at the intersection of US 67 and FM 900. Saltillo has a population around 300. Despite being unincorporated, Saltillo has its own post office, assigned the ZIP Code 75457. The Saltillo Independent School District serves area students.

== History ==
On January 13, 1985, Saltillo was the location of a car chase and shootout between FBI agents, Texas Rangers, and a group of kidnappers. Two of the six kidnappers were wounded in the gunfight, and their hostage, a 13-year-old girl, was rescued unharmed. The case was later featured in an episode of The FBI Files.
