= Miller Grove, Illinois =

Former settlement in Illinois, United States

Coordinates: 37.4973912°N 88.6383814°W

Miller Grove, Illinois is a former settlement in Pope County, Illinois. Miller Grove was a predominantly Black settlement founded in 1844 by freed slaves from Tennessee. The site is currently within the Shawnee National Forest.
