= Sulphur Bluff Independent School District =

School district in Texas

Location
- Sulphur Bluff, Texas United States

District information
- Type: Public School
- Grades: PK-12
- Superintendent: Dustin Carr

Students and staff
- Athletic conference: UIL Class A
- District mascot: Bears
- Colors: Blue & White

Sulphur Bluff Independent School District is a public school district based in the community of Sulphur Bluff, Texas (USA).

Located in northeastern Hopkins County, the district extends into a small portion of Franklin County.

Sulphur Bluff ISD has one school that serves students in grades Pre-Kindergarten though twelve.

In 2009, the school district was rated "academically acceptable" by the Texas Education Agency.

The district changed to a four-day school week in fall 2022.

== Athletics ==
The Sulphur Bluff Bears compete in the following sports -

Cross Country, Volleyball, Basketball, Baseball, Softball, Track and Field, and Golf.
