= Como, Texas =

- Town
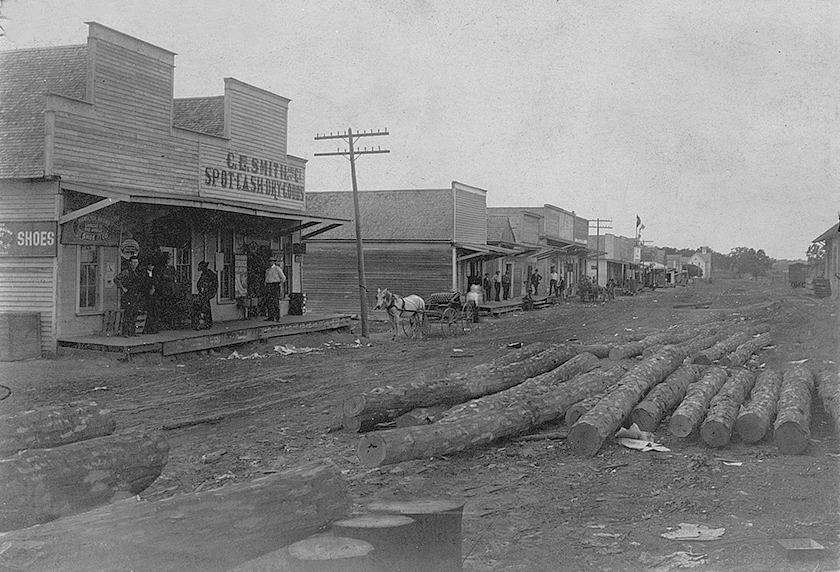
- Como, c. 1909

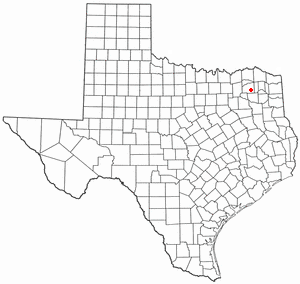
- Location of Como, Texas

- Coordinates: 33°3′41″N 95°28′25″W
- Country: United States
- State: Texas
- County: Hopkins

Area
  - Total: 1.11 sq mi (2.87 km^{2})
  - Land: 1.10 sq mi (2.86 km^{2})
  - Water: 0.0039 sq mi (0.01 km^{2})
- Elevation: 535 ft (163 m)

Population (2020)
  - Total: 728
  - Density: 659/sq mi (255/km^{2})
- Time zone: UTC-6 (Central (CST))
  - Summer (DST): UTC-5 (CDT)
- ZIP code: 75431
- Area codes: 903, 430
- FIPS code: 48-16252
- GNIS feature ID: 1333188
- Website: cityofcomo.myruralwater.com

Como is a town in Hopkins County, Texas, United States. The population was 728 at the 2020 census.

== Geography ==
Como is in southeastern Hopkins County, along State Highway 11, which leads northwest 10 miles (16 km) to Sulphur Springs, the county seat, and southeast 13 miles (21 km) to Winnsboro. According to the United States Census Bureau, the town has a total area of 1.1 square miles (2.9 km^{2}), of which 2.1 acres (8,536 m^{2}), or 0.30%, are water.

== Demographics ==
Historical population
Census	Pop.	Note	%±
1920	827		—
1930	392		−52.6%
1940	412		5.1%
1950	356		−13.6%
1960	300		−15.7%
1970	474		58.0%
1980	554		16.9%
1990	563		1.6%
2000	621		10.3%
2010	702		13.0%
2020	728		3.7%
U.S. Decennial Census

Como racial composition as of 2020 (NH = Non-Hispanic) (Note: Note: the US Census treats Hispanic/Latino as an ethnic category. This table excludes Latinos from the racial categories and assigns them to a separate category. Hispanics/Latinos can be of any race.)
Race	Number	Percentage
White (NH)	431	59.2%
Black or African American (NH)	7	0.96%
Asian (NH)	2	0.27%
Mixed/Multi-Racial (NH)	43	5.91%
Hispanic or Latino	245	33.65%
Total	728	

As of the 2020 United States census, there were 728 people, 215 households, and 186 families residing in the town.

== Education ==
Como is served by the Como-Pickton Consolidated Independent School District.
