= Dike, Texas =

Unincorporated community in Texas, US

Coordinates: 33°14′19″N 95°28′56″W

Dike is an unincorporated community in Hopkins County, Texas, United States. Dike has a post office, with the ZIP code 75437. On May 6, 2023, Dike voted on whether to incorporate into the city of Dike; the measure failed, with 32 votes in favor against 108 opposed.
