= North Hopkins Independent School District =

School district in Texas

Location
- Birthright, Texas United States

District information
- Type: Public School
- Grades: PK-12
- Superintendent: Brian Lowe

Students and staff
- Athletic conference: UIL Class AA
- District mascot: Panthers
- Colors: Red & White

North Hopkins Independent School District is a public school district located in North Central Hopkins County, Texas (USA).

In 2009, the school district was rated "academically acceptable" by the Texas Education Agency.

== Schools ==
North Hopkins ISD operates two schools:

- North Hopkins High School (Grades 7-12)
- North Hopkins Elementary School (Grades PK-6)
