= KDEB (AM) =

Estes Park, Colorado; United States
- Frequency: 1470 kHz

Programming
- Format: Oldies
- Affiliations: Westwood One

Ownership
- Owner: Kona Coast Radio, LLC

History
- First air date: August 1967
- Last air date: January 12, 2014
- Former call signs: KKEP (1967–1974); KSIR (1974–1991); KRKI (1991–1998); KEZZ (1998–2006); KEPL (2006–2011); KRBR (2011–2012)

Technical information
- Facility ID: 67483
- Class: D
- Power: 1,000 watts day 53 watts night
- Transmitter coordinates: 40°20′15.00″N 105°31′36.00″W

KDEB (1470 AM) was a radio station broadcasting an oldies format. Licensed to Estes Park, Colorado, United States, the station was owned by Kona Coast Radio, LLC

KDEB's nighttime skywave signal was received in parts of southern Wyoming, including Laramie and Green River.

== History ==
The station was licensed previously with call signs KSIR (now assigned at 1010 AM in Brush, Colorado), and KKEP. The station went on the air in August, 1967. On April 4, 1998, the station changed its call sign to KEZZ. On September 9, 2006, the station's call sign was changed to KEPL, on June 28, 2011 to KRBR, and on June 21, 2012 to KDEB.

On August 15, 2008, KEPL Radio changed to an all talk format and branded itself "Talk Radio 1470". In May, KEPL flipped to oldies from True Oldies Channel.

The station went off the air on Monday, October 17, 2011, after the FCC had deleted its license the previous day.
