= Miller Grove, Texas =

Miller Grove
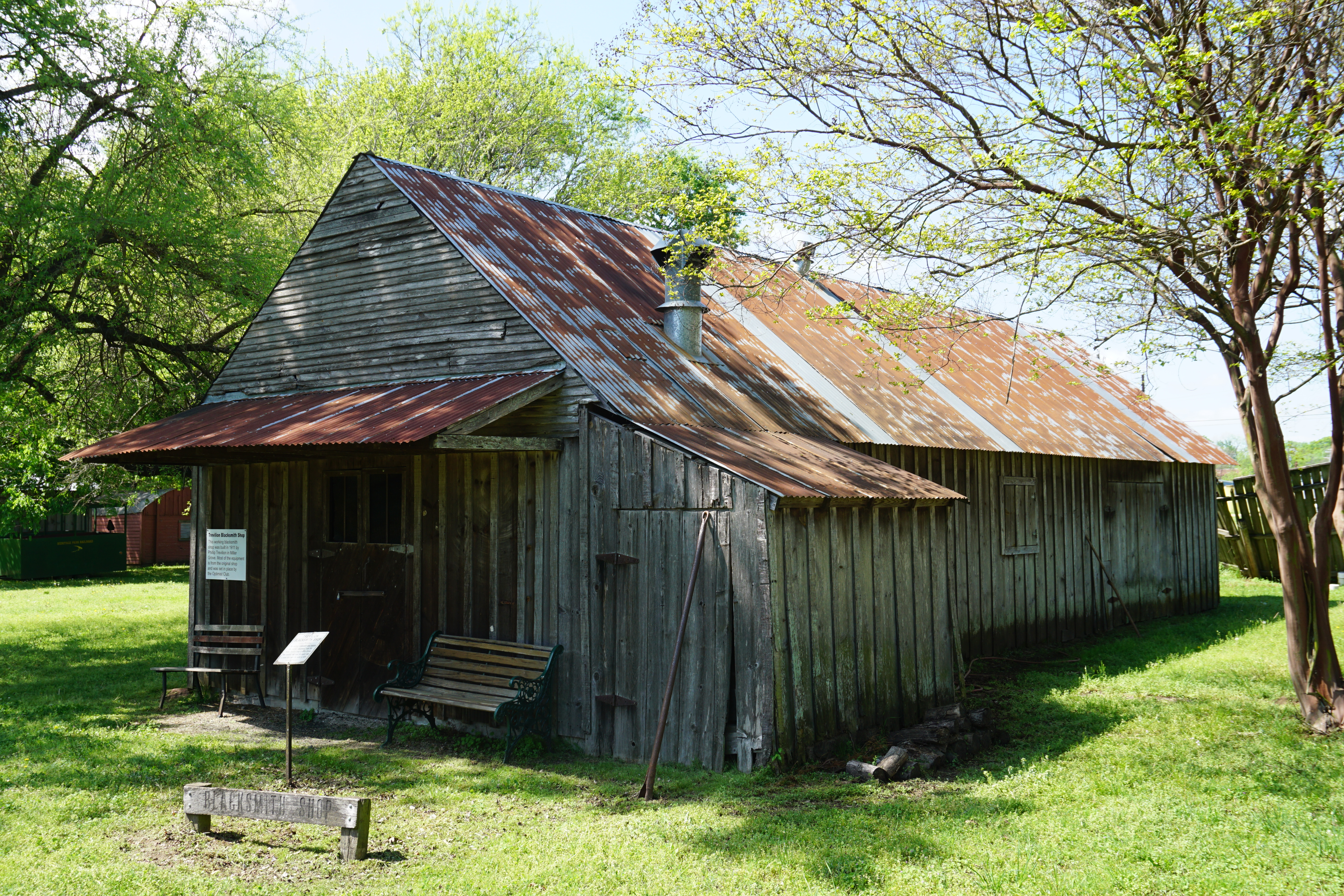
- Trevilion Blacksmith Shop (Miller Grove, Texas)

- Location in Texas
- Coordinates: 33.024°N 95.803°W
- Country: United States
- State: Texas
- County: Hopkins

Miller Grove is an unincorporated town in Hopkins County, Texas, with an estimated population in 2000 of 115. The Miller Grove Independent School District serves area students.
