= Miller Grove Independent School District =

School district in Texas

Location
- Miller Grove, Texas United States

District information
- Type: Public School
- Grades: PK-12
- Established: 1846
- Superintendent: Tonya Loftice

Students and staff
- Athletic conference: UIL Class A
- District mascot: Hornets
- Colors: Green and Gold

Miller Grove Independent School District is a public school district located in the unincorporated community of Miller Grove, in southwestern Hopkins County, Texas, United States. It extends into a small portion of Rains County.

In 2009, the school district was rated "academically acceptable" by the Texas Education Agency (TEA). However, TEA rated the school district "A" on a scale from A to F for the 2021-2022 academic year.

== Schools ==
Miller Grove ISD operates two schools:

- Miller Grove High School (Grades 7-12)
- Miller Grove Elementary School (Grades PK-6).
