= Cumby, Texas =

- City
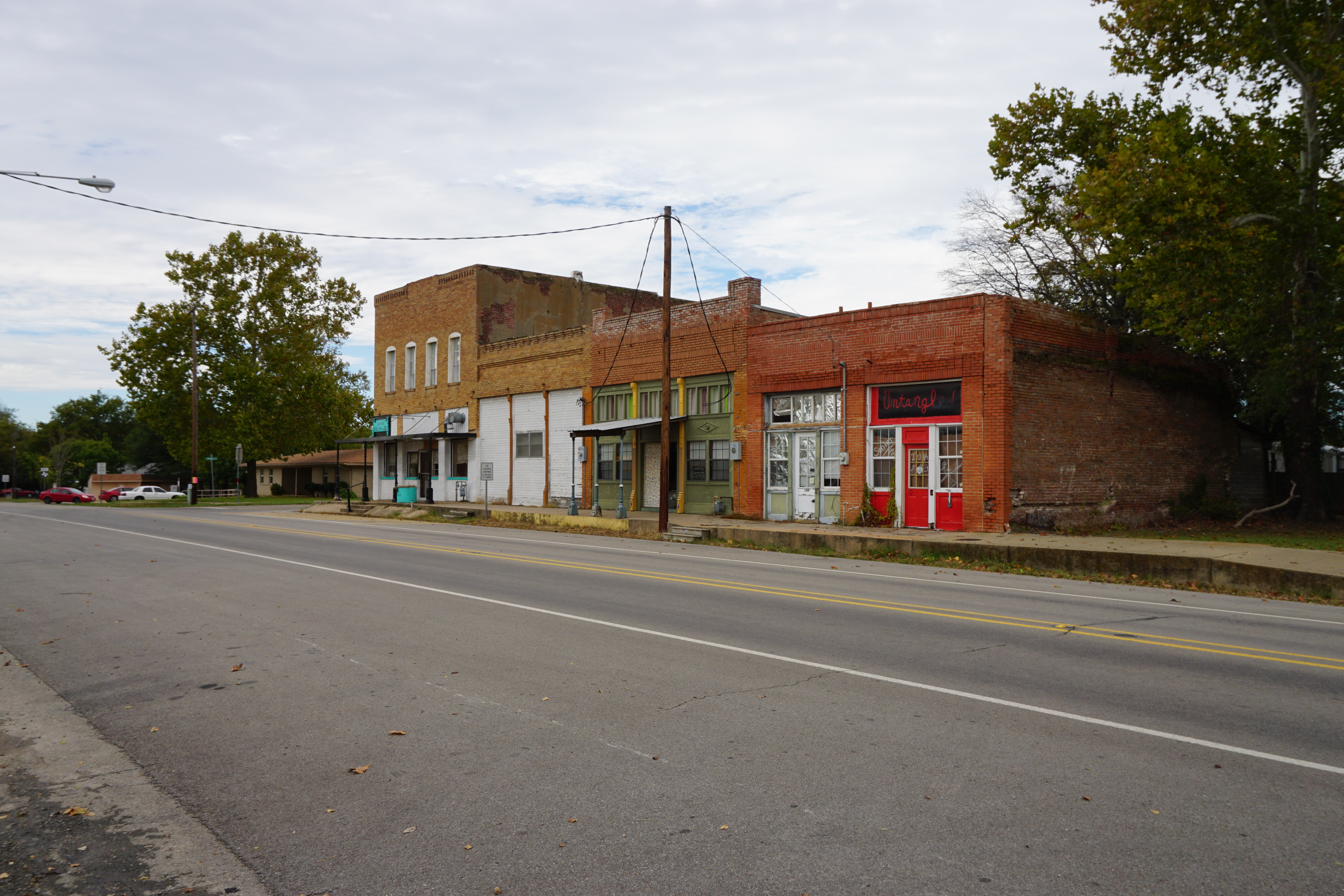
- Main Street in Cumby

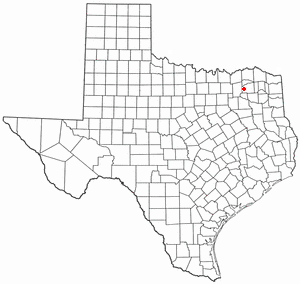
- Location of Cumby, Texas

- Coordinates: 33°8′7″N 95°50′25″W
- Country: United States
- State: Texas
- County: Hopkins

Area
  - Total: 0.96 sq mi (2.49 km^{2})
  - Land: 0.96 sq mi (2.49 km^{2})
  - Water: 0 sq mi (0.00 km^{2})
- Elevation: 646 ft (197 m)

Population (2020)
  - Total: 679
  - Density: 706/sq mi (273/km^{2})
- Time zone: UTC-6 (Central (CST))
  - Summer (DST): UTC-5 (CDT)
- ZIP code: 75433
- Area codes: 903, 430
- FIPS code: 48-18128
- GNIS feature ID: 1333809
- Website: cumbytx.com

Cumby is a city in Hopkins County, Texas, United States. The population was 777 at the 2010 census, up from 616 at the 2000 census. In 2020, its population was 679.

== History ==
Originally known as Black Jack Grove as early as 1848, from 1857 to 1858 the post office was renamed to Theodocias. It was renamed again to Black Jack Grove before being renamed a final time to Cumby in 1896. It was named for Confederate army veteran Robert H. Cumby (1825-1881).

== Geography ==
Cumby is located in western Hopkins County at 33°8′7″N 95°50′25″W (33.135235, –95.840141). Interstate 30 runs through the south side of the city, with access from Exit 110. I-30 leads east 14 miles (23 km) to Sulphur Springs, the Hopkins county seat, and west 65 miles (105 km) to downtown Dallas.

According to the United States Census Bureau, the city has a total area of 1.0 square mile (2.6 km^{2}), of which 0.004 square miles (0.01 km^{2}), or 0.50%, are water. The city sits on a watershed divide, with the north side draining towards the South Sulphur River, part of the Red River watershed, and the south side of the city draining towards Lake Fork Creek, part of the Sabine River watershed.

== Climate ==
Cumby is part of the humid subtropical climate region.

== Demographics ==
Historical population
Census	Pop.	Note	%±
1920	945		—
1930	646		−31.6%
1940	642		−0.6%
1950	504		−21.5%
1960	447		−11.3%
1970	628		40.5%
1980	647		3.0%
1990	571		−11.7%
2000	616		7.9%
2010	777		26.1%
2020	679		−12.6%
U.S. Decennial Census

=== 2020 census ===
As of the 2020 census, Cumby had a population of 679, 277 households, and 222 families residing in the city. The median age was 41.9 years; 23.7% of residents were under the age of 18 and 19.3% of residents were 65 years of age or older. For every 100 females there were 91.3 males, and for every 100 females age 18 and over there were 94.0 males age 18 and over.

0.0% of residents lived in urban areas, while 100.0% lived in rural areas.

There were 277 households in Cumby, of which 33.2% had children under the age of 18 living in them. Of all households, 48.0% were married-couple households, 18.4% were households with a male householder and no spouse or partner present, and 27.1% were households with a female householder and no spouse or partner present. About 30.3% of all households were made up of individuals and 15.5% had someone living alone who was 65 years of age or older.

There were 311 housing units, of which 10.9% were vacant. The homeowner vacancy rate was 0.5% and the rental vacancy rate was 8.7%.

Racial composition as of the 2020 census
Race	Number	Percent
White	613	90.3%
Black or African American	5	0.7%
American Indian and Alaska Native	14	2.1%
Asian	1	0.1%
Native Hawaiian and Other Pacific Islander	0	0.0%
Some other race	13	1.9%
Two or more races	33	4.9%
Hispanic or Latino (of any race)	32	4.7%

=== 2000 census ===
At the 2000 census, there were 616 people, 262 households, and 178 families residing in the city. The population density was 708.1 inhabitants per square mile (273.4/km^{2}). There were 292 housing units at an average density of 335.6 per square mile (129.6/km^{2}). The racial makeup of the city was 97.56% White, 0.65% Native American, 0.97% from other races, and 0.81% from two or more races. Hispanic or Latino of any race were 2.60% of the population.

There were 262 households, out of which 26.7% had children under the age of 18 living with them, 52.7% were married couples living together, 10.3% had a female householder with no husband present, and 31.7% were non-families. 27.5% of all households were made up of individuals, and 16.4% had someone living alone who was 65 years of age or older. The average household size was 2.35 and the average family size was 2.87.

In the city, the population was spread out, with 22.9% under the age of 18, 7.6% from 18 to 24, 29.2% from 25 to 44, 21.6% from 45 to 64, and 18.7% who were 65 years of age or older. The median age was 39 years. For every 100 females, there were 98.1 males. For every 100 females age 18 and over, there were 91.5 males.

The median income for a household in the city was $30,547, and the median income for a family was $34,091. Males had a median income of $25,833 versus $19,643 for females. The per capita income for the city was $15,228. About 7.0% of families and 11.9% of the population were below the poverty line, including 9.6% of those under age 18 and 15.9% of those age 65 or over.

== Education ==
The city is served by the Cumby Collegiate Independent School District.
