= Sulphur Bluff, Texas =

Unincorporated community in Texas, US

Coordinates: 33°19′57″N 95°23′54″W

Sulphur Bluff is an unincorporated community in northeastern Hopkins County, Texas, United States.

Despite being unincorporated, Sulphur Bluff has its own post office, assigned the ZIP code of 75481.

The Sulphur Bluff Independent School District serves area students.

Its population was approximately 280 in 1990.
