= Hopkins County, Texas =

County in Texas, United States

- County
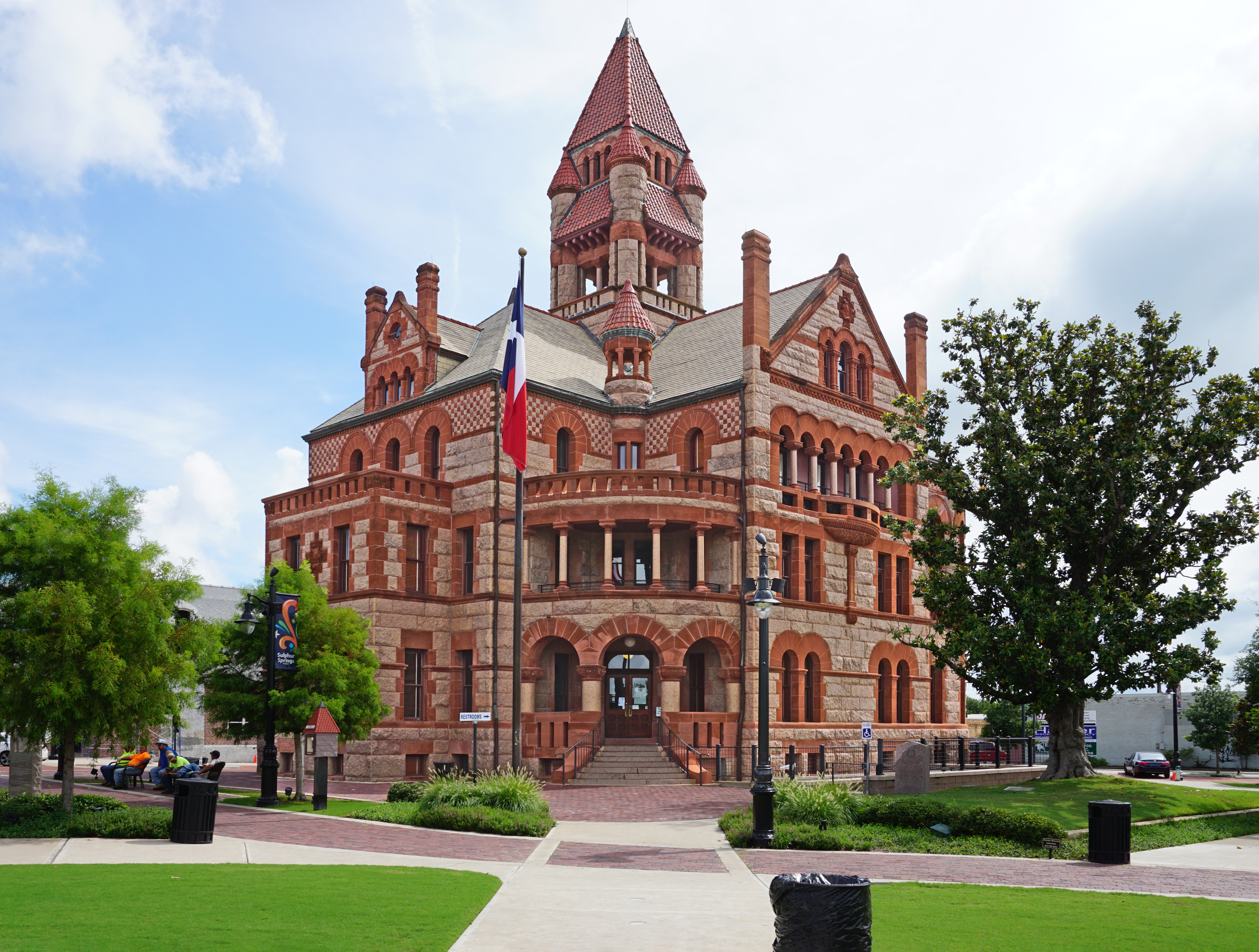
- The Hopkins County Courthouse in Sulphur Springs. The structure was added to the National Register of Historic Places on April 11, 1977.

- Location within the U.S. state of Texas
- Coordinates: 33°09′N 95°34′W
- Country: United States
- State: Texas
- Founded: 1846
- Seat: Sulphur Springs
- Largest city: Sulphur Springs

Area
  - Total: 793 sq mi (2,050 km^{2})
  - Land: 767 sq mi (1,990 km^{2})
  - Water: 26 sq mi (67 km^{2}) 3.2%

Population (2020)
  - Total: 36,787
  - Estimate (2025): 39,063 ▲
  - Density: 48.0/sq mi (18.5/km^{2})
- Time zone: UTC−6 (Central)
  - Summer (DST): UTC−5 (CDT)
- Congressional district: 4th
- Website: www.hopkinscountytx.org

Hopkins County is a county located in the U.S. state of Texas. As of the 2020 census, its population was 36,787. Its county seat is Sulphur Springs. Hopkins County is named for the family of David Hopkins, an early settler in the area. Hopkins County comprises the Sulphur Springs, TX Micropolitan Statistical Area. Hopkins County was once known as the Dairy Capital of Texas. Although dairy farms declined in the area in the late 1990s there are still a number of these located there. The Southwest Dairy Museum is located in Sulphur Springs.

== Geography ==
According to the U.S. Census Bureau, the county has a total area of 793 square miles (2,050 km^{2}), of which 767 square miles (1,990 km^{2}) is land and 26 square miles (67 km^{2}) (3.2%) is water.

=== Major highways ===
- Interstate 30
- U.S. Highway 67
- State Highway 11
- State Highway 19
- State Highway 154
- State Loop 301

=== Adjacent counties ===
- Delta County (north)
- Franklin County (east)
- Wood County (south)
- Rains County (southwest)
- Hunt County (west)

== Communities ==
=== Cities ===
- Cumby
- Sulphur Springs (county seat)

=== Towns ===
- Como
- Tira

=== Unincorporated communities ===
- Addran
- Birthright
- Brashear
- Dike
- Gafford
- Miller Grove
- Pickton
- Saltillo
- Sulphur Bluff

=== Ghost towns ===
- Dillon
- Who'd Thought It

=== By Population ===
City	Population	Type
Sulphur Springs	15,941	City
Dike	1,078	UC
Como	727	Town
Cumby	679	City
Tira	313	Town
Saltillo	<300	UC
Cumby	679	UC
Sulphur Bluff	~280	UC
Brashear	<280	UC
Miller Grove	~115	UC
Birthright	~40	UC
Addran	Data Unavailable	UC
Gafford	Data Unavailable	UC
Pickton	Data Unavailable	UC
Dillon	N/A	Ghost Town
Who'd Thought It	N/A	Ghost Town

== Demographics ==
Historical population
Census	Pop.	Note	%±
1850	2,623		—
1860	7,745		195.3%
1870	12,651		63.3%
1880	15,461		22.2%
1890	20,572		33.1%
1900	27,950		35.9%
1910	31,038		11.0%
1920	34,791		12.1%
1930	29,410		−15.5%
1940	30,264		2.9%
1950	23,490		−22.4%
1960	18,594		−20.8%
1970	20,710		11.4%
1980	25,247		21.9%
1990	28,833		14.2%
2000	31,960		10.8%
2010	35,161		10.0%
2020	36,787		4.6%
2025 (est.)	39,063	▲	6.2%
U.S. Decennial Census; 1850–2010 2010 2020

=== Racial and ethnic composition ===
Hopkins County, Texas – Racial and ethnic composition Note: the US Census treats Hispanic/Latino as an ethnic category. This table excludes Latinos from the racial categories and assigns them to a separate category. Hispanics/Latinos may be of any race.
Race / Ethnicity (NH = Non-Hispanic)	Pop 1980	Pop 1990	Pop 2000	Pop 2010	Pop 2020	% 1980	% 1990	% 2000	% 2010	% 2020
White alone (NH)	22,246	24,755	25,946	26,501	25,976	88.11%	85.86%	81.18%	75.37%	70.61%
Black or African American alone (NH)	2,538	2,469	2,525	2,448	2,373	10.05%	8.56%	7.90%	6.96%	6.45%
Native American or Alaska Native alone (NH)	36	121	166	162	198	0.14%	0.42%	0.52%	0.46%	0.54%
Asian alone (NH)	28	67	79	172	277	0.11%	0.23%	0.25%	0.49%	0.75%
Native Hawaiian or Pacific Islander alone (NH)	x	x	13	14	4	x	x	0.04%	0.04%	0.01%
Other race alone (NH)	2	14	19	18	85	0.01%	0.05%	0.06%	0.05%	0.23%
Mixed race or Multiracial (NH)	x	x	245	478	1,390	x	x	0.77%	1.36%	3.78%
Hispanic or Latino (any race)	397	1,407	2,967	5,368	6,484	1.57%	4.88%	9.28%	15.27%	17.63%
Total	25,247	28,833	31,960	35,161	36,787	100.00%	100.00%	100.00%	100.00%	100.00%

=== 2020 census ===
As of the 2020 census, the county had a population of 36,787. The median age was 39.9 years. 24.2% of residents were under the age of 18 and 19.1% of residents were 65 years of age or older. For every 100 females there were 96.0 males, and for every 100 females age 18 and over there were 93.2 males age 18 and over.

The racial makeup of the county was 74.8% White, 6.5% Black or African American, 0.9% American Indian and Alaska Native, 0.8% Asian, <0.1% Native Hawaiian and Pacific Islander, 8.4% from some other race, and 8.6% from two or more races. Hispanic or Latino residents of any race comprised 17.6% of the population.

39.9% of residents lived in urban areas, while 60.1% lived in rural areas.

There were 13,947 households in the county, of which 33.4% had children under the age of 18 living in them. Of all households, 53.0% were married-couple households, 16.3% were households with a male householder and no spouse or partner present, and 25.2% were households with a female householder and no spouse or partner present. About 25.0% of all households were made up of individuals and 12.6% had someone living alone who was 65 years of age or older.

There were 15,671 housing units, of which 11.0% were vacant. Among occupied housing units, 68.9% were owner-occupied and 31.1% were renter-occupied. The homeowner vacancy rate was 1.5% and the rental vacancy rate was 9.3%.

=== 2000 census ===
As of the census of 2000, there were 31,960 people, 12,286 households, and 8,882 families residing in the county. The population density was 41 people per square mile (16 people/km^{2}). There were 14,020 housing units at an average density of 18 units per square mile (6.9/km^{2}).

The racial makeup of the county was 85.11% White, 7.99% Black or African-American, 0.68% Native American, 0.25% Asian, 0.06% Pacific Islander, 4.55% from other races, and 1.36% from two or more races. 9.28% of the population were Hispanic or Latino of any race.

There were 12,286 households, out of which 32.50% had children under the age of 18 living with them, 58.50% were married couples living together, 10.00% had a female householder with no husband present, and 27.70% were non-families. 24.10% of all households were made up of individuals, and 11.80% had someone living alone who was 65 years of age or older. The average household size was 2.56 and the average family size was 3.04.

In the county, the population was spread out, with 26.10% under the age of 18, 8.40% from 18 to 24, 27.30% from 25 to 44, 23.00% from 45 to 64, and 15.20% who were 65 years of age or older. The median age was 37 years. For every 100 females, there were 96.10 males. For every 100 females age 18 and over, there were 93.30 males.

The median income for a household in the county was $32,136, and the median income for a family was $38,580. Males had a median income of $30,377 versus $20,751 for females. The per capita income for the county was $17,182. About 11.30% of families and 14.60% of the population were below the poverty line, including 17.40% of those under age 18 and 14.60% of those age 65 or over.

== Education ==
These schools districts serve Hopkins County:

- Como-Pickton Consolidated ISD
- Cumby Collegiate ISD
- Miller Grove ISD
- North Hopkins ISD
- Saltillo ISD
- Sulphur Bluff ISD
- Sulphur Springs ISD

Additionally, nearby Paris Junior College and East Texas A&M University provide post-secondary education.

== Media ==
KSST AM 1230 and Suddenlink Cable Channel 18 serve Hopkins County from Sulphur Springs. Hopkins County is part of the Dallas/Fort Worth DMA. The county is served by one newspaper, the Sulphur Springs News-Telegram, part of Times Media Group. Local media outlets are: KDFW-TV, KXAS-TV, WFAA-TV, KTVT-TV, KERA-TV, KTXA-TV, KDFI-TV, KDAF-TV, and KFWD-TV. Other nearby stations that provide coverage for Hopkins County are from the Tyler/Longview/Jacksonville market and they include: KLTV-TV, KYTX-TV, KFXK-TV, KCEB-TV, and KETK-TV. In the City of Sulphur Springs Suddenlink Communications continues to offer KLTV-TV, KYTX-TV, and KETK-TV on its Cable Television services for the area.

== Politics ==
Hopkins County is located within District 2 of the Texas House of Representatives. Hopkins County is located within District 1 of the Texas Senate.

United States presidential election results for Hopkins County, Texas
Year	Republican		Democratic		Third party(ies)	
Year	No.	%	No.	%	No.	%
1912	146	5.77%	1,999	78.95%	387	15.28%
1916	218	7.19%	2,568	84.72%	245	8.08%
1920	837	22.66%	2,548	68.98%	309	8.36%
1924	557	11.52%	4,156	85.97%	121	2.50%
1928	1,767	48.85%	1,845	51.01%	5	0.14%
1932	261	5.06%	4,891	94.81%	7	0.14%
1936	261	8.65%	2,753	91.22%	4	0.13%
1940	551	10.00%	4,955	89.91%	5	0.09%
1944	533	10.93%	3,981	81.64%	362	7.42%
1948	479	10.26%	3,885	83.24%	303	6.49%
1952	2,460	39.56%	3,750	60.31%	8	0.13%
1956	2,206	41.26%	3,118	58.31%	23	0.43%
1960	2,117	39.52%	3,228	60.26%	12	0.22%
1964	1,518	26.86%	4,133	73.14%	0	0.00%
1968	1,860	28.65%	2,700	41.59%	1,932	29.76%
1972	3,903	69.20%	1,710	30.32%	27	0.48%
1976	2,556	33.67%	4,992	65.75%	44	0.58%
1980	3,834	46.09%	4,344	52.22%	140	1.68%
1984	5,772	60.80%	3,707	39.05%	14	0.15%
1988	5,133	50.61%	4,984	49.14%	25	0.25%
1992	3,398	31.93%	4,085	38.38%	3,160	29.69%
1996	4,341	43.72%	4,522	45.54%	1,066	10.74%
2000	7,076	64.86%	3,692	33.84%	142	1.30%
2004	8,582	71.15%	3,443	28.54%	37	0.31%
2008	9,299	71.98%	3,530	27.32%	90	0.70%
2012	9,836	77.13%	2,777	21.78%	140	1.10%
2016	10,707	79.09%	2,510	18.54%	321	2.37%
2020	12,719	79.79%	3,046	19.11%	176	1.10%
2024	13,754	81.98%	2,917	17.39%	107	0.64%

United States Senate election results for Hopkins County, Texas1
Year	Republican		Democratic		Third party(ies)	
Year	No.	%	No.	%	No.	%
2024	13,269	79.43%	3,142	18.81%	294	1.76%

United States Senate election results for Hopkins County, Texas2
Year	Republican		Democratic		Third party(ies)	
Year	No.	%	No.	%	No.	%
2020	12,497	79.87%	2,833	18.11%	317	2.03%

Texas Gubernatorial election results for Hopkins County
Year	Republican		Democratic		Third party(ies)	
Year	No.	%	No.	%	No.	%
2022	10,223	83.24%	1,999	16.28%	59	0.48%

== See also ==
- National Register of Historic Places listings in Hopkins County, Texas
- Recorded Texas Historic Landmarks in Hopkins County
