= Aledo High School (Texas) =

Location
- 1000 Bailey Ranch Rd. Aledo, Texas 76008-4407; United States; 32.7124°N 97.6164°W

Information
- School type: Public high school
- Motto: "Aspire to Excellence"
- School district: Aledo Independent School District
- Principal: Michael Martinak
- Staff: 104.83 (FTE)
- Grades: 9–12
- Enrollment: 1,660 (2023–2024)
- Student to teacher ratio: 15.84
- Colors: Black & Orange
- Athletics conference: UIL Class AAAAA
- Mascot: Bearcats/Lady Cats
- Yearbook: Ledoian
- Website: ahs.aledoisd.org

Aledo High School is a public high school located in Aledo, Texas, United States and classified as a 6A school by the UIL. It is part of the Aledo Independent School District located in south central Parker County. Along with Aledo, students attend from the towns of Annetta and Annetta South as well as portions of Annetta North, Hudson Oaks, and Willow Park. In 2018, the school was rated "Met Standard" by the Texas Education Agency with a two star distinction in Mathematics and Social Studies.

== Demographics ==
The demographic breakdown of the 1,273 students enrolled for the 2017-2018 school year is as follows:

- Female – 48.0%
- Male – 52.0%
- Native American/Alaskan – 0.5%
- Asian/Pacific islander – 0.9%
- Black – 2.1%
- Hispanic – 12.0%
- White – 81.9%
- Multiracial – 2.5%

== Athletics ==
The Aledo Bearcats compete in the following sports:

- Baseball
- Basketball
- Cross Country
- Football
- Golf
- Powerlifting
- Soccer
- Softball
- Swimming
- Tennis
- Track
- Volleyball
- Wrestling

Aledo High School's most prominent athletic team is the Bearcat football team. Other sports having success are the boys golf team and the Ladycat softball team who also finished ranked #1 in the country in 2008. The 2008 Bearcat Tennis team, for the first time, was the District 6-4A champs with a perfect district season.

=== State titles ===
- Baseball
  - 2014 (4A)
  - 2025 (5A/D1)
  - 2026 (5A/D1)
- Football
  - 1998 (3A/D1), 2009 (4A/D2), 2010 (4A/D2), 2011 (4A/D2), 2013 (4A/D2), 2014 (5A/D1), 2016 (5A/D2), 2018 (5A/D2), 2019 (5A/D2), 2020 (5A/D2), 2022 (5A/D1), 2023 (5A/D1)
- Boys Golf
  - Individual – 1968 (B)
  - Team – 1978 (1A), 2007 (4A)
- Girls Golf
  - Individual – 2014, (4A) 2015
- Softball
  - 2008 (4A), 2014 (4A), 2015 (5A)

The Bearcat football team won three consecutive state titles in 4A Division II from 2009 to 2011, and three consecutive state titles in 5A Division II from 2018 to 2020. The team now has 12 state titles, with 11 of these in the last 16 seasons (2009-2024). They are the only UIL school in Texas who has won three or more consecutive titles, twice. The Bearcat's 12 State Championships are the most by any high school in Texas. The 2013 team became the first team in high school history to score 1,000 points in a single season. After a 91-0 blowout of Western Hills a parent of the losing team filed bullying charges with the school district. A reporter for the Associated Press called Aledo a "powerhouse" in Texas high school football.

==== State Finalists ====
- Football
  - 1974 (1A), 2017 (5A/D2)
- Boy's Soccer
  - 2005 (4A), 2018 (5A)
- Volleyball
  - 2012 (4A)
- Girl's Soccer
  - 2017 (5A)
- Softball
  - 2021 (5A), 2026 (5A/D1)
- FFFA
  - 2022

== Extracurricular activities ==
Aledo High School's most prominent sport is the Aledo High School Marching Band (AKA Bearcat Regiment). The Regiment marching band was a UIL State Finalist in 2000 (3A), 2005 (4A), 2007 (4A), 2011 (4A), 2015, and 2017 (5A). The Regiment for the first time receive the title of Super Regional Grand Champions in the 2A class in 2008 at the San Antonio BOA. In 2010 the Bearcat Regiment was for the first time a finalist at BOA Super Regionals in San Antonio. The concert band also received TMEA Honor Band State Finals awards in 2002 (3A) and 2007 (4A), and became The TMEA Honor Band State Champions in 2015 (5A). In UIL academic competition, the Current Issues and Events team and the Literary Criticism team won the state championship in 2009, with the Current Issues and Events team successfully defending their state championship in 2010 and placing first in 2012; the Social Studies Team won the state championship (4A) in 2011 and was both district and regional champion.

- UIL Lone Star Cup Champions
  - 1998 (3A) – Co-champions with Dripping Springs.

== Notable alumni ==
- David Barton – religious activist
- Cody Bradford – MLB pitcher and 2023 World Series champion with the Texas Rangers
- Ryan Christian – former CFL and Italian League professional football player
- JoJo Earle – college football wide receiver
- Brayden Fowler-Nicolosi – college football quarterback for the Colorado State Rams
- Johnathan Gray – professional football player
- Hauss Hejny – college football quarterback for the TCU Horned Frogs and the Oklahoma State Cowboys
- Sean Henn – former MLB pitcher
- Daniel Hunter – member of independent music project Analog Rebellion
- Josh Jenkins – musician in Green River Ordinance
- Micah Kinard – vocalist, Oh, Sleeper
- Cheyenne Knight – professional golfer on LPGA Tour
- Jase McClellan – college football running back for the Alabama Crimson Tide, professional football player for the Atlanta Falcons
- Money Parks – college football wide receiver for the Utah Utes
- Mary Michael Patterson – theater actress and singer
- Creed Willems – MLB catcher and first baseman
- Shelby Brown – actress
