= Texas's 25th congressional district =

U.S. House district for Texas

Coordinates: 31°30′03″N 97°48′57″W

- Interactive map of district boundaries
- Representative: Roger Williams; R–Weatherford
- Distribution: 67.47% urban; 32.53% rural
- Population (2025): 813,075
- Median household income: $80,117
- Ethnicity: 58.4% White; 21.8% Hispanic; 11.7% Black; 3.9% Two or more races; 3.4% Asian; 0.9% other
- Cook PVI: R+18

Texas's 25th congressional district of the United States House of Representatives stretches from Arlington and Fort Worth to some of its outer southwestern suburbs, as well as rural counties east of Abilene. The district's current Representative is Roger Williams.

== History ==
=== 1980s ===
The 25th district was created as a result of the redistricting cycle after the 1980 census. The district was originally anchored in the southern parts of Houston and Harris County, including the Texas Medical Center, the Astrodome, Astroworld and the southern shores of the Houston Ship Channel, as well as Rice University, Hobby Airport and Ellington Field. An economically and racially diverse district that narrowly favored Ronald Reagan in 1980, the 25th encompassed such a diverse collection of Houston neighborhoods including both the middle-class suburban neighborhoods of Westbury and Meyerland in southwest Houston (the latter also being the center of Houston's Jewish community) and Park Place and Glenbrook Valley in southeast Houston, the majority African-American neighborhoods of Sunnyside and South Park in southern Houston and Harris County, and much of southeast Harris County including northern parts of the Clear Lake City master-planned community in southeast Houston and such working-class suburbs as Pasadena, Deer Park, La Porte and Seabrook.

Much of this area previously comprised the northern half of the previous 22nd district represented by conservative Republican Ron Paul, and at the time was largely prosperous as Houston continued to benefit from the oil boom of the previous decade that resulted in thousands moving to the Houston area during this time, as well as from growing medical and space industry sectors that benefited respectively from both the increased prominence of the Med Center and the launch of the Space Shuttle program. In the 1980 election, Paul narrowly defeated former Harris County assistant district attorney Mike Andrews in his 1980 reelection to a second full term, largely on the basis of his strong support in the then-emerging Republican stronghold of Fort Bend County as well as his home county of Brazoria.

While Paul's 22nd district was redrawn into a heavily Republican seat comprising the aforementioned emerging suburban counties, along with a largely Republican section of southwest Houston and Harris County along the Southwest Freeway (what eventually became Interstate 69) extending as far east as Greenway Plaza, that he would easily win reelection in 1982, the new 25th took in much of the former 22nd's Democratic-leaning Harris County portion. In the 1982 election, Andrews was the Democratic nominee for the new district against Republican attorney Mike Faubion, winning 60.4 percent of the vote in a district whose voters largely favored President Reagan's economic program but otherwise favored abortion rights and defense spending. Despite Reagan narrowly winning the district in 1984, Andrews easily won a second term with 64 percent of the vote over future state senator and Texas Land Commissioner Jerry Patterson, which would be the closest the district came to being competitive in its original iteration, as the district was hit hard by the impact of the 1980s oil glut that deeply affected Houston's economy, including plummeting real estate values, rising crime numbers and dramatic racial shifts in parts of the district where Anglo residents moved out to suburban areas south of the city including Sugar Land, Pearland, Missouri City and Friendswood. Andrews would only face Republican opposition once more in this version of the district, winning 71 percent of the vote in 1988 despite his district only narrowly favoring Michael Dukakis (whose running mate was Texas U.S. Senator and Houston resident Lloyd Bentsen) over adopted son and Vice President George H. W. Bush with over 51 percent of the vote.

=== 1990s/early 2000s ===
The 25th district was radically altered in the 1992 and 1994 elections, with many majority Black and Hispanic precincts moved into the 18th district of Democrat Craig Washington and the new majority-Hispanic 29th district that would be won by Anglo Democrat Gene Green, respectively. The new district would take a combination of mostly white moderate and working-class communities in southwest and southeast Houston as well as southern and eastern Harris County, including most of Pasadena, Baytown and Channelview along with the Texas Medical Center, along with an eastern spur of Fort Bend County including a mostly Black southwest section of the city of Houston. In this new iteration, Andrews would face his toughest reelection to date in 1992 against Republican challenger Dolly Madison McKenna, who polled 41.4 percent of the vote to 56 percent for Andrews. After Andrews vacated the seat to make an unsuccessful run for the Democratic nomination for U.S. Senate in 1994 against Republican Kay Bailey Hutchison, Democratic investment banker Ken Bentsen, a nephew of Lloyd Bentsen (who by this time was serving as Secretary of the Treasury under Bill Clinton), won the seat in a close race with 52.3 percent of the vote against Republican opponent Gene Fontenot who polled 45 percent.

After the 18th and 29th districts were struck down by the Supreme Court in Bush v. Vera as an unconstitutional racial gerrymander in 1996, the 25th would be altered into a more compact district that stayed entirely within Harris County, stretching from the Westchase and Alief areas of southwest Houston, through southern parts of Houston and Harris County, and traveling all the way to the eastern parts of the Houston Ship Channel and Harris County, while encompassing such suburbs as upper-middle class Bellaire and West University Place in the west and working-class Baytown and Pasadena in the east. In the 1996 special election (conducted as such as the 1996 primaries had already taken place when the districts were struck down), Bentsen would go on to win over 57 percent of the vote against Mike Andrews' 1992 opponent, Dolly Madison McKenna, despite Clinton only narrowly winning the district at the presidential level with under 51 percent of the vote.

The contest by McKenna would mark the beginning of a series of competitive but underdog Republican challenges for the seat over four cycles; in 1998 Bentsen would win 58 percent against Republican challenger John Sanchez, while in 2000 he polled 60 percent against Republican Phil Sudan despite the district only giving a plurality of the vote to Al Gore over native son and Texas Governor George W. Bush (son of former President George H.W. Bush). After Bentsen retired to make an unsuccessful run for the Democratic nomination for the open U.S. Senate of retiring Republican Phil Gramm in 2002, former Houston City Council member Chris Bell defeated Republican Tom Reiser with less than 55 percent of the vote in a district that now stretched from the affluent River Oaks neighborhood west of downtown Houston to much of southwest and southeast Houston, along with all or parts of many of the same working-class suburbs east of Houston that had been in previous iterations of the 25th including southern parts of Pasadena and most of Baytown, Highlands and La Porte.

=== 2004 Redistricting "fajita strip" ===
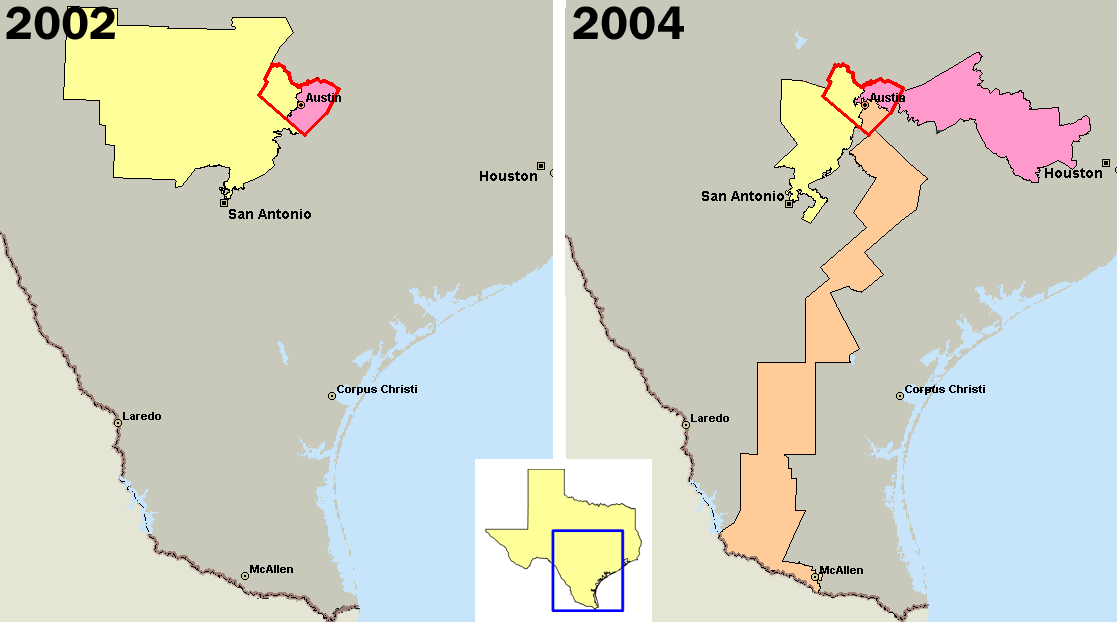
The long, thin geography of the 25th district after the 2004 redistricting, along with its predominately Tejano population earned the district the disparaging nickname "The Fajita Strip" especially due the district gerrymandering Austin and Hispanic voters.

In 2003, after Republicans gained control of the Texas House of Representatives for the first time since Reconstruction, the new Republican majority (with outside assistance from then-U.S. House Majority Leader Tom DeLay from the neighboring 22nd district, where he had succeeded Ron Paul in 1984) radically altered the state's congressional map. The old 25th essentially became the 9th district, though Bell's home was drawn into the heavily Republican 7th district. Bell ultimately sought reelection the following year in the new 9th where he lost to fellow Democrat Al Green in the Democratic primary,

A new 25th was created in an area stretching from McAllen, in the Rio Grande Valley at the U.S.-Mexico border, all the way to a heavily Democratic southeastern portion of Austin. It was informally referred to by political pundits and the Texas press as "the fajita strip".

The new district would be won by incumbent Democrat Lloyd Doggett, who had previously represented the neighboring 10th district since being elected in 1994. That district had been stretched to several heavily Republican suburbs and rural areas west of Houston. In June 2006, the US Supreme Court ruled that the nearby 23rd District, represented by Republican Henry Bonilla, violated the Voting Rights Act of 1965, since the 2003 redistricting replaced the Latino-centered city of Laredo with more Anglo-centered communities in northwest San Antonio and the western Texas Hill Country, making Hispanics a minority in that district. It determined that the 25th was not a sufficient replacement for the 23rd, since it wasn't compact enough and the two Hispanic communities (McAllen and Austin), were over 300 miles apart. This ruling led to both seats, as well as the 28th, 15th, and 21st Congressional Districts being redrawn. The 2006 redrawing had the 25th district now stretching from most of central and southeast Austin to several heavily Republican rural counties southeast of Austin (see below); Doggett nonetheless won reelection in 2006 and 2008 with little difficulty. However, in 2010 Doggett faced his toughest reelection, winning 53 percent of the vote against Republican physician and future state senator Donna Campbell.

=== 2010s ===
In July 2011, Texas Governor Rick Perry signed into law a redistricting plan ("C185"), approved by the Texas legislature in June, which gave the 25th district a completely different geography for the 2012 elections, including part of Travis County, and stretching as far north as Johnson County, south of Fort Worth, with Fort Hood situated in the geographic heart of the district. The redistricting split Travis County into five districts, four of which (the 10th, 17th, 21st and 25th) were heavily Republican. As a result, the only realistic place for Lloyd Doggett to run in was the new 35th district (which by weight of population is more of a San Antonio district than an Austin district); Doggett nonetheless won reelection in the new 35th which was by far the most Democratic of all the districts now serving Travis County. Former Texas Secretary of State and auto dealer Roger Williams, who had previously been a candidate for the U.S. Senate as early as 2010 while Kay Bailey Hutchison was still serving (she would eventually retire the following year and would be succeeded in 2012 by Ted Cruz), ultimately won a crowded Republican primary and would go on to win comfortable margins or better in a district where Democrats were only competitive in the western Travis County portion of the district (which includes some of the most Republican areas in the county including much of the area surrounding Lake Travis; Mitt Romney won 60 percent of the vote in the new district in 2012.

As the 2010s progressed, fast-growing Austin and Travis County became even more Democratic than they already were, with Donald Trump's nationwide struggles with suburban voters beginning to impact Republican candidates both in presidential and in midterm elections. As a result, Williams and other Republican congressional nominees in Travis County faced increasingly competitive elections later in the decade. His closest reelection came in 2018, when Williams won 53.5 percent of the vote against Democratic challenger Julie Oliver and would go on to win less than 56 percent in a rematch with Oliver, as the district gave 55 percent of the vote to Donald Trump in 2016 and 2020 (with Trump losing the Travis County portion by large margins). For a number of years, there was a consolidated lawsuit against the redistricting; in March 2017, a panel of federal judges ruled that the new 35th district and two others were illegally drawn with discriminatory intent. However, the district was allowed to stand in the Supreme Court's 2018 Abbott v. Perez ruling.

=== 2020s ===
For the 2022 election, the 25th was redrawn into a district anchored in the southwest corner of the Dallas-Fort Worth metroplex, including a southern portion of Tarrant County encompassing most of Arlington including AT&T Stadium, Globe Life Field and Six Flags Over Texas, as well as most or all of several rural counties between the Metroplex and Abilene. Donald Trump won less than 65 percent of the vote in this new district, with only the Tarrant County portion considered competitive. Roger Williams won reelection unopposed in the new 25th district, which includes Weatherford where he owns an automobile dealership.

== Recent election results from statewide races ==
=== 2023–2027 boundaries ===
Year	Office	Results
2008	President	McCain 66% - 34%
2012	President	Romney 70% - 30%
2014	Senate	Cornyn 73% - 27%
2014	Governor	Abbott 70% - 30%
2016	President	Trump 66% - 29%
2018	Senate	Cruz 65% - 35%
2018	Governor	Abbott 69% - 30%
2018	Lt. Governor	Patrick 64% - 34%
2018	Attorney General	Paxton 64% - 34%
2018	Comptroller of Public Accounts	Hegar 66% - 31%
2020	President	Trump 65% - 34%
2020	Senate	Cornyn 66% - 32%
2022	Governor	Abbott 68% - 31%
2022	Lt. Governor	Patrick 66% - 32%
2022	Attorney General	Paxton 66% - 31%
2022	Comptroller of Public Accounts	Hegar 69% - 29%
2024	President	Trump 68% - 31%
2024	Senate	Cruz 64% - 33%

=== 2027–2033 boundaries ===
Year	Office	Results
2008	President	McCain 56% - 43%
2012	President	Romney 60% - 40%
2014	Senate	Cornyn 63% - 37%
2014	Governor	Abbott 60% - 40%
2016	President	Trump 58% - 38%
2018	Senate	Cruz 57% - 43%
2018	Governor	Abbott 60% - 38%
2018	Lt. Governor	Patrick 56% - 42%
2018	Attorney General	Paxton 56% - 42%
2018	Comptroller of Public Accounts	Hegar 58% - 39%
2020	President	Trump 57% - 41%
2020	Senate	Cornyn 58% - 40%
2022	Governor	Abbott 61% - 37%
2022	Lt. Governor	Patrick 60% - 38%
2022	Attorney General	Paxton 60% - 37%
2022	Comptroller of Public Accounts	Hegar 62% - 36%
2024	President	Trump 61% - 37%
2024	Senate	Cruz 58% - 39%
2026	Senate	Paxton 49% - 48%
2026	Governor	Abbott 51% - 47%

== Composition ==
For the 118th and successive Congresses (based on redistricting following the 2020 census), the district contains all or portions of the following counties and communities:

Callahan County (4)

Baird, Clyde (part; also 19th), Cross Plains, Putnam

Comanche County (5)

All 5 communities

Eastland County (6)

All 6 communities

Erath County (5)

All 5 communities

Hood County (9)

All 9 communities

Jack County (3)

All 3 communities

Johnson County (11)

Briaroaks, Burleson (part; also 6th; shared with Tarrant County), Cleburne, Coyote Flats (part; also 6th), Cresson (shared with Hood and Johnson counties), Cross Timber, Fort Worth (part; also 12th, 24th, 26th, and 33rd; shared with Denton, Parker, Tarrant, and Wise counties), Godley, Joshua, Keene (part; also 6th), Rio Vista

Palo Pinto County (8)

All 8 communities

Parker County (9)

Aledo (part; also 12th), Annetta North (part; also 12th), Cresson (shared with Hood and Johnson counties), Dennis, Fort Worth (part; also 12th, 24th, 26th, and 33rd; shared with Denton, Johnson, Tarrant, and Wise counties), Horseshoe Bend, Weatherford (part; also 12th), Western Lake, Willow Park (part; also 12th)

Somervell County (1)

Glen Rose

Stephens County (1)

Breckenridge

Tarrant County (12)

Arlington (part; also 6th, 30th, and 33rd), Burleson (part; also 6th; shared with Johnson County), Crowley (part; also 12th), Dalworthington Gardens, Edgecliff Village, Forest Hill (part; also 33rd), Fort Worth (part; also 12th, 24th, 26th, and 33rd; shared with Denton, Johnson, Parker, and Wise counties), Grand Prairie (part; also 6th and 33rd; shared with Dallas and Ellis counties), Kennedale, Mansfield (part; also 6th), Pantego, Rendon

Young County (4)

All 4 communities

== List of members representing the district ==
Member	Party	Years	Cong ress	Electoral history	District location
District established January 3, 1983
Michael A. Andrews (Houston)	Democratic	January 3, 1983 – January 3, 1995	98th 99th 100th 101st 102nd 103rd	Elected in 1982. Re-elected in 1984. Re-elected in 1986. Re-elected in 1988. Re-elected in 1990. Re-elected in 1992. Retired to run for U.S. senator.	1983–1985 [data missing]
Michael A. Andrews (Houston)	Democratic	January 3, 1983 – January 3, 1995	98th 99th 100th 101st 102nd 103rd	Elected in 1982. Re-elected in 1984. Re-elected in 1986. Re-elected in 1988. Re-elected in 1990. Re-elected in 1992. Retired to run for U.S. senator.	1985–1993 [data missing]
Michael A. Andrews (Houston)	Democratic	January 3, 1983 – January 3, 1995	98th 99th 100th 101st 102nd 103rd	Elected in 1982. Re-elected in 1984. Re-elected in 1986. Re-elected in 1988. Re-elected in 1990. Re-elected in 1992. Retired to run for U.S. senator.	1993–1997; Parts of Fort Bend and Harris
Ken Bentsen Jr. (Houston)	Democratic	January 3, 1995 – January 3, 2003	104th 105th 106th 107th	Elected in 1994. Re-elected in 1996. Re-elected in 1998. Re-elected in 2000. Retired to run for U.S. senator.	1993–1997; Parts of Fort Bend and Harris
Ken Bentsen Jr. (Houston)	Democratic	January 3, 1995 – January 3, 2003	104th 105th 106th 107th	Elected in 1994. Re-elected in 1996. Re-elected in 1998. Re-elected in 2000. Retired to run for U.S. senator.	1997–2003; Parts of Harris
Chris Bell (Houston)	Democratic	January 3, 2003 – January 3, 2005	108th	Elected in 2002. Redistricted to the 9th district and lost renomination.	2003–2005; Parts of Fort Bend and Harris
Lloyd Doggett (Austin)	Democratic	January 3, 2005 – January 3, 2013	109th 110th 111th 112th	Redistricted from the 10th district and re-elected in 2004. Re-elected in 2006. Re-elected in 2008. Re-elected in 2010. Redistricted to the 35th district.	2005–2007 Caldwell, Duval, Gonzales, Jim Hogg, Karnes, Live Oak, and Starr; parts of Hidalgo and Travis
Lloyd Doggett (Austin)	Democratic	January 3, 2005 – January 3, 2013	109th 110th 111th 112th	Redistricted from the 10th district and re-elected in 2004. Re-elected in 2006. Re-elected in 2008. Re-elected in 2010. Redistricted to the 35th district.	2007–2013 Caldwell, Colorado, Fayette, Gonzales, Hays and Lavaca; parts of Bastrop and Travis
Roger Williams (Weatherford)	Republican	January 3, 2013 – present	113th 114th 115th 116th 117th 118th 119th	Elected in 2012. Re-elected in 2014. Re-elected in 2016. Re-elected in 2018. Re-elected in 2020. Re-elected in 2022. Re-elected in 2024. Re-elected in 2026.	2013–2023 Bosque, Burnet, Coryell, Hamilton, Hill, Johnson, Lampasas, and Somervell; parts of Bell, Erath, Hays, Tarrant, and Travis
Roger Williams (Weatherford)	Republican	January 3, 2013 – present	113th 114th 115th 116th 117th 118th 119th	Elected in 2012. Re-elected in 2014. Re-elected in 2016. Re-elected in 2018. Re-elected in 2020. Re-elected in 2022. Re-elected in 2024. Re-elected in 2026.	2023–2027 Callahan (part), Comanche, Eastland, Erath, Hood, Jack, Johnson (part), Palo Pinto, Parker (part), Somervell, Stephens, Tarrant (part), and Young

== Recent elections ==
=== 2004 ===
2004 United States House of Representatives elections in Texas
Party	Candidate	Votes	%	±%
Democratic	Lloyd Doggett	108,309	67.6	+12.9
Republican	Rebecca Klein	49,252	30.7	−12.4
Libertarian	James Werner	2,656	1.7	+0.7
Majority		59,057	36.9	
Turnout		160,217		
Democratic hold		Swing	+12.6	

=== 2006 ===
On June 28, 2006, the U.S. Supreme Court declared that the Texas legislature's 2003 redistricting plan violated the Voting Rights Act in the case of the 23rd district. The main basis for the ruling was that the old 23rd was a protected majority-Hispanic district—in other words, if the 23rd was redrawn in a way to put Hispanics in a minority, a new majority-Hispanic district had to be created. Since the 25th was not compact enough to be an acceptable replacement, the 23rd had to be struck down. The size of the 23rd required the redrawing of nearly every district from El Paso to San Antonio.

As a result, on August 4, 2006, a three-judge panel announced replacement district boundaries for 2006 election for the 23rd district, as well as for the 15th, 21st, 25th and 28th districts. On election day in November, these five districts held open primaries; if any candidate received over 50%, they were elected. Otherwise, a runoff election in December decided the seat.

The redrawn 25th was more compact and restricted to Central Texas, comprising more of Travis County, most of Bastrop County, and all of Hays, Caldwell, Fayette, Gonzales, Lavaca, and Colorado Counties.

Incumbent congressman Doggett faced Republican Grant Rostig (formerly the Libertarian nominee), independent candidate Brian Parrett, and Libertarian Party Barbara Cunningham, and won re-election.

=== 2008 ===
In the 2008 election Doggett faced Republican George Morovich, a structural engineer from La Grange and Libertarian Jim Stutsman, a retired Army veteran. Doggett won with 65.8% of the vote to Morovich's 30.5% and Stutsman's 3.7%. Doggett won 73.8% of the vote in his Austin-based stronghold of Travis County.

=== 2010 ===
Dogget faced Republican and "Tea Party favorite" Donna Campbell, and again held his seat, though by a surprisingly small margin.

2010 United States House of Representatives elections in Texas
Party	Candidate	Votes	%	±%
Democratic	Lloyd Doggett (incumbent)	99,851	53	−14.6
Republican	Donna Campbell	84,780	45	+14.3
Libertarian	Jim Stutsman	4,424	2	+0.3
Democratic hold		Swing	-14.5	

=== 2012 ===
The new district boundaries were more favorable to Republicans, as had been foreseen.

2012 United States House of Representatives elections in Texas
Party	Candidate	Votes	%	±%
Republican	Roger Williams	154,245	58.4	+13.4
Democratic	Elaine Henderson	98,827	37.4	−15.5
Libertarian	Betsy Dewey	10,860	4.1	+2.1
Majority		55,418	21.00	
Turnout		263,932	100	
Republican gain from Democratic		Swing	+13.4	

=== 2014 ===
2014 United States House of Representatives elections in Texas
Party	Candidate	Votes	%	±%
Republican	Roger Williams (incumbent)	107,120	60.21	+1.77
Democratic	Marco Montoya	64,463	36.23	−1.21
Libertarian	John Betz	6,300	3.54	−.57
Majority		42,657	23.98	
Turnout		177,883	100	−32.6
Republican hold		Swing	+1.77	

=== 2016 ===
2016 United States House of Representatives elections in Texas
Party	Candidate	Votes	%	±%
Republican	Roger Williams (incumbent)	180,988	58.35	−1.86
Democratic	Kathi Thomas	117,073	37.74	+1.51
Libertarian	Loren Marc Schneiderman	12,135	3.91	+.37
Majority		63,915	20.61	−3.37
Turnout		310,196	100	+75.1
Republican hold		Swing	-1.86	

=== 2018 ===
2018 United States House of Representatives elections in Texas
Party	Candidate	Votes	%	±%
Republican	Roger Williams (incumbent)	163,023	53.53	−4.82
Democratic	Julie Oliver	136,385	44.78	+7.04
Libertarian	Desarae Lindsey	5,145	1.69	−2.22
Majority		26,638	8.75	−11.86
Turnout		304,553	100	−1.82
Republican hold		Swing	-4.82	

=== 2020 ===
2020 United States House of Representatives elections in Texas
Party	Candidate	Votes	%
Republican	Roger Williams (incumbent)	220,088	55.93
Democratic	Julie Oliver	165,697	42.11
Libertarian	Bill Kelsey	7,738	2.00
Total votes		393,523	100.0
Republican hold			

=== 2022 ===
2022 United States House of Representatives elections in Texas
Party	Candidate	Votes	%
Republican	Roger Williams (incumbent)	185,270	100.0
Total votes		185,270	100.0
Republican hold			

=== 2024 ===
2024 United States House of Representatives elections in Texas
Party	Candidate	Votes	%
Republican	Roger Williams (incumbent)	263,042	100.0
Write-in		1,661	0.6
Total votes		264,703	100.0
Republican hold			
