= Millsap =

Millsap or Millsaps is a surname of English and Irish origin. Derived from a nickname for a "spiritless man", the name is borrowed from Middle English for milksop, meaning "piece of bread soaked in milk". It has been suggested that it may have been an occupational name for a farmer who dealt with milk products.

A variant, Millsop, is also derived from similar origins, and is found in County Armagh and County Down in Ulster.

== Places ==
- Millsap, Texas

== Education ==
- Millsaps College, liberal arts college located in Jackson, Mississippi
  - Millsaps Majors, sports teams in the athletic program of Millsaps College above
- Millsap Independent School District, public school district based in Millsap, Texas
  - Millsap High School, public high school part of the Millsap Independent School District schools

== Persons ==
Millsap

- Elijah Millsap (born 1987), American international basketball player of American-Filipino origin
- Paul Millsap (born 1985), American NBA basketball player
- Roger Millsap (1954–2014), American psychometrician

Millsaps

- Jesse Jackson Millsaps (1827–1900), Arkansas politician
- Patrick N. Millsaps (born 1973), American lawyer
- Reuben Webster Millsaps (1833–1916), American businessman, financier and philanthropist
- William Millsaps (born 1939), bishop of the Episcopal Missionary Church

== See also ==
- Ronnie Milsap (born 1943), American country music singer
