= Brock High School (Texas) =

Location
- 400 Eagle Spirit Ln; Brock, Texas 76087-9636; United States; 32.66701°N 97.93102°W

Information
- School type: Public High School
- School district: Brock Independent School District
- Principal: Bob
- Teaching staff: 55.05 (FTE)
- Grades: 9-12
- Enrollment: 628 (2023-2024)
- Student to teacher ratio: 11.41
- Colors: Blue & Gold
- Athletics conference: UIL Class 4A
- Mascot: Eagle
- Yearbook: Eagle
- Website: Brock High School

Brock High School is a public high school located in unincorporated Brock, Texas, United States and classified as a 4A school by the UIL. It is part of the Brock Independent School District located in north central Parker County. In 2015, the school was rated "Met Standard" by the Texas Education Agency.

== Athletics ==
The Brock Eagles compete in these sports: cross country, volleyball, football, basketball, powerlifting, golf, tennis, track, softball, baseball and wrestling.

=== State Titles ===
- Baseball
  - 2006(2A)
- Girls Basketball
  - 2002(1A/D1), 2003(2A), 2005(2A), 2009(2A), 2010(2A), 2011(2A), 2012(2A), 2013(2A)
- Boys Basketball
  - 2002(1A/D1), 2003(2A), 2015(3A)
- Boys Golf
  - 2015(3A)
- Boys Track
  - 2022(3A)
- Softball
  - 2009(2A)
- Volleyball
  - 2012(2A)
- Football
  - 2015 (3A/D1)
- UIL Lone Star Cup Champions
  - 2009(2A), 2010(2A), 2015(3A), 2016(3A), 2018(3A), 2019 (3A)

==== State Finalists ====
- Baseball
  - 2022(3A), 2026(4A/D2)
- Football
  - 2021(3A/D1)
- Softball
  - 2026(4A/D2)

== Notable alumni ==
- Baylor Cupp (2019), NFL tight end for the Carolina Panthers
- Cash Jones (2021), NFL running back for the Atlanta Falcons
- Brock Riker (2024), college football center for the Penn State Nittany Lions
- Sawyer Strosnider (2024), MLB outfielder for the Milwaukee Brewers
- Evan O'Conner (2026), college baseball pitcher for the Arizona State Sun Devils
