= Baylor Cupp =

American football player (born 2000)

Profile
- Position: Tight end

Personal information
- Born: May 10, 2000 (age 26); Brock, Texas, U.S.
- Listed height: 6 ft 6 in (1.98 m)
- Listed weight: 243 lb (110 kg)

Career information
- High school: Brock (Brock, Texas)
- College: Texas A&M (2019–2021); Texas Tech (2022–2023)
- NFL draft: 2024: undrafted

Career history
- Kansas City Chiefs (2024); Baltimore Ravens (2025)*; Dallas Renegades (2026); Arizona Cardinals (2026)*
- * Offseason or practice squad member only
- Stats at Pro Football Reference

Baylor Cupp (born May 10, 2000) is an American professional football tight end. He played college football for the Texas A&M Aggies and Texas Tech Red Raiders.

== Early life ==
Cupp attended high school at Brock. Coming out of high school, Cupp was rated as a five star recruit where he held offers from schools such as Alabama, Florida, Georgia, LSU, Notre Dame, Ole Miss, Texas and Texas A&M. Ultimately, Cupp decided to commit to play college football for the Texas A&M Aggies.

== College career ==
=== Texas A&M ===
During Cupp's first two seasons in 2019 and 2020, he did not appear in any games after suffering season ending injuries. In the 2021 season, Cupp made his collegiate debut appearing in ten games with one start, however he would not record a catch in the season. After the conclusion of the 2021 season, Cupp decided to enter his name into the NCAA transfer portal.

=== Texas Tech ===
Cupp decided to transfer to play for the Texas Tech Red Raiders. In Cupp's two seasons at Texas Tech in 2022 and 2023 he played in 24 games, totaling 23 receptions for 246 yards and four touchdowns. After the conclusion of the 2023 season, Cupp decided to declare for the 2024 NFL draft.

== Professional career ==
Pre-draft measurables
Height	Weight	Arm length	Hand span	Wingspan	Vertical jump	Broad jump	Bench press
6 ft 6 3/8 in (1.99 m)	243 lb (110 kg)	33 in (0.84 m)	10 3/8 in (0.26 m)	6 ft 8 1/4 in (2.04 m)	30 in (0.76 m)	9 ft 11 in (3.02 m)	23 reps
All values from Pro Day

=== Kansas City Chiefs ===
Cupp was signed by the Kansas City Chiefs as an undrafted free agent after the 2024 NFL draft. He was waived on August 27, 2024, and re-signed to the practice squad. On December 20, 2024, Cupp was placed on practice squad; injured.

Cupp signed a reserve/future contract with Kansas City on February 11, 2025. On May 1, Cupp was released by the Chiefs.

=== Baltimore Ravens ===
On August 2, 2025, Cupp was signed by the Baltimore Ravens as an undrafted free agent. He was waived by the Ravens on August 25.

=== Dallas Renegades ===
On March 3, 2026, Cupp signed with the Dallas Renegades of the United Football League (UFL).

=== Arizona Cardinals ===
On August 15, 2026, Cupp signed with the Arizona Cardinals. On August 24, Cupp was waived by the Cardinals.
