= Millsap High School =

Coordinates: 32.7579°N 98.0055°W

Location
- 617 Bulldog Blvd. Millsap, Texas 76066; United States

Information
- School type: Public high school
- School district: Millsap Independent School District
- Principal: Tabetha Abbot
- Teaching staff: 30.26 (FTE)
- Grades: 9-12
- Enrollment: 322 (2023-2024)
- Student to teacher ratio: 10.64
- Colors: Maroon & White
- Athletics conference: UIL Class 3A
- Mascot: Bullfrog
- Website: Millsap High School website

Millsap High School is a public high school located in Millsap, Texas, United States. It is part of the Millsap Independent School District serving students in southwest Parker County and classified as a 3A school by the UIL. In 2013, the school was rated "Met Standard" by the Texas Education Agency.

== Notable alumni ==
Casey James - Country singer and American Idol contestant.
