= Lake Weatherford =

Lake in Texas, United States

- Lake Weatherford from the floating boardwalk

- Location within Texas
- Interactive map of Lake Weatherford
- Location: Weatherford, Texas
- Coordinates: 32°46′47.0″N 97°41′19.3″W
- Type: Reservoir lake
- River sources: Clear Fork of the Trinity River
- Basin countries: United States
- Managing agency: City of Weatherford
- First flooded: March 15, 1957
- Surface area: 1,280 acres (520 ha)
- Max. depth: 39 feet (12 m)
- Surface elevation: 902 feet (275 m)
- References: GNIS

Lake Weatherford is a lake located in Weatherford, Texas. The lake stands to the north-east of the city, north of Hudson Oaks and Willow Park.

The Clear Fork of the Trinity River flows into the lake.

The lake is regularly stocked with largemouth bass, white bass, crappie, channel catfish, and sunfish.

== Boardwalk ==
The lake features country's second longest floating boardwalk that crosses the lake.
