= Brock Riker =

American football player (born 2006)

No. 51 – Penn State Nittany Lions
- Position: Center
- Class: Redshirt Sophomore

Personal information
- Born: February 20, 2006 (age 20)
- Listed height: 6 ft 4 in (1.93 m)
- Listed weight: 291 lb (132 kg)

Career information
- High school: Brock (Brock, Texas)
- College: Texas State (2024–2025); Penn State (2026–present)
- Stats at ESPN

Brock Riker (born February 20, 2006) is an American football center for the Penn State Nittany Lions. He previously played for the Texas State Bobcats.

== Early life ==
Riker attended Brock High School in Brock, Texas, and committed to play college football for the Texas State Bobcats.

== College career ==
As a freshman at Texas State in 2024, Riker played in three games and was redshirted. He then started all 12 games at center in 2025, earning second-team freshman all-American honors, before entering the NCAA transfer portal.

Riker transferred to play for the Penn State Nittany Lions. He had a strong spring practice.
