= Aledo Independent School District =

School district in Texas, United States

- Aledo ISD's location in the DFW Metroplex.

Location
- 1008 Bailey Ranch Road; Aledo, Texas ESC Region 11 USA
- Coordinates: 32°42′40″N 97°37′6″W

District information
- Type: Independent school district
- Motto: "A Past to Remember; A Future to Mold"
- Grades: Pre-K through 12
- Superintendent: Dr. Susan K. Bohn
- Schools: 9 (2015-16)
- NCES District ID: 4807780

Students and staff
- Students: 5,200 (2015-16)
- Teachers: 302.66 (2009-10) (on full-time equivalent (FTE) basis)
- Student–teacher ratio: 15.2 (2009-10)
- Athletic conference: UIL Class 5A Football & Basketball
- District mascot: Bearcats
- Colors: Orange, Black

Other information
- TEA District Accountability Rating for 2011-12: Recognized
- Website: Aledo ISD

Aledo Independent School District is a public school district based in Aledo, Texas (USA). Located in southeastern Parker County, a small portion of the district extends into western Tarrant County. In addition to Aledo, the district also serves the towns of Annetta and Annetta South as well as portions of Annetta North, Cresson, Hudson Oaks, and Willow Park.

== Finances ==
As of the 2010–2011 school year, the appraised valuation of property in the district was $2,578,963,000. The maintenance tax rate was $0.117 and the bond tax rate was $0.026 per $100 of appraised valuation.

== Academic achievement ==
In 2011, the school district was rated "recognized" by the Texas Education Agency. Thirty-five percent of districts in Texas in 2011 received the same rating. No state accountability ratings will be given to districts in 2012. A school district in Texas can receive one of four possible rankings from the Texas Education Agency: Exemplary (the highest possible ranking), Recognized, Academically Acceptable, and Academically Unacceptable (the lowest possible ranking).

Historical district TEA accountability ratings

- 2011: Recognized
- 2010: Recognized
- 2009: Recognized
- 2008: Academically Acceptable
- 2007: Academically Acceptable
- 2006: Recognized
- 2005: Recognized
- 2004: Recognized

== Schools ==
In the 2021–22 school year, the district had students in 10 schools.

High schools

- Aledo High School (Grades 10–12)
- Don R. Daniel Ninth Grade Campus (Grade 9)

Middle schools

- McAnally Middle School (Grades 6–8)
- Aledo Middle School (Grades 6–8)

Elementary schools

- Coder Elementary School (Grades PK-5)
- McCall Elementary School (Grades K-5)
- Stuard Elementary School (Grades K-5)
- Vandagriff Elementary School (Grades K-5)
- Walsh Elementary School (Grades K-5)
- Annetta Elementary School (Grades K-5)
- Lynn McKinney Elementary School (Grades K-5)

== Special programs ==
=== Athletics ===
Aledo High School participates in the boys sports of baseball, basketball, football, soccer, and wrestling. The school participates in the girls sports of basketball, soccer, softball, volleyball, and wrestling. For the 2015 through 2017 school years, Aledo High School will play football in UIL Class 5A.

== Police department ==
The Aledo ISD Police Department is a full-service police department that serves the communities of Aledo, Willow Park, Hudson Oaks, Anetta North, Anetta and Anetta South. The AISD police jurisdiction covers a 131.13-square-mile (339.6 km^{2}) area and lies within Parker and Tarrant County, Texas. The department provides routine patrol for all of the district's properties, criminal investigations, in addition to school resource officers assigned to various school buildings. All AISD police officers are TCLEOSE certified peace officers with full arrest powers.

Aledo ISD Police Department was the first school district police department in Parker County, and as with any Texas school police agency, its officers have jurisdiction within the school district boundaries and in any county within the State of Texas in which the district has property owned, leased, rented, or otherwise under its control.

As of March 2015 the Chief of Police is Fred Collie who formerly served as a Chief Deputy for Precinct 5, Dallas County Constables Office and as a Deputy Chief for the Arlington Texas Police Department.

== Notable incidents ==
In April 2021, students at the Daniel Ninth Grade Campus were disciplined after it was learned they were playing a game on messaging platform Snapchat in which they assigned prices to particular persons of color at the school and would then "trade" them according to that perceived value. Screenshots show that the group chat in which the game occurred was, at various times, labelled as "Slave Trade" and other names that included an ethnic slur.

== See also ==
- List of school districts in Texas
- List of high schools in Texas
