= Horseshoe Bend, Texas =

- census-designated place
- Location within Texas
- Coordinates: 32°34′31″N 97°52′42″W
- Country: United States
- State: Texas
- County: Parker

Area
  - Total: 1.73 sq mi (4.5 km^{2})
  - Land: 1.65 sq mi (4.3 km^{2})
  - Water: 0.08 sq mi (0.21 km^{2})
- Elevation: 718 ft (219 m)

Population (2010)
  - Total: 789
  - Density: 478/sq mi (185/km^{2})
- Time zone: UTC-6 (Central)
  - Summer (DST): UTC-5 (Central)
- ZIP code: 76087
- Area code: 817
- GNIS feature ID: 2586939

Horseshoe Bend is a census-designated place in Parker County, Texas, United States. It was a new CDP for the 2010 census. As of the 2020 census, Horseshoe Bend had a population of 949.

== Geography ==
Horseshoe Bend is located approximately 12 miles south of Weatherford in southern Parker County. The community sits in a horseshoe-shaped bend along the Brazos River. It is part of the Dallas–Fort Worth metroplex.

According to the United States Census Bureau, the CDP has a total area of 1.73 square miles (4.5 km^{2}), of which 1.65 square miles (4.3 km^{2}) is land and 0.08 square miles (0.21 km^{2}) is water.

== Demographics ==
Historical population
Census	Pop.	Note	%±
2010	789		—
2020	949		20.3%
U.S. Decennial Census; 1850–1900 1910; 1920 1930 1940; 1950 1960 1970; 1980 1990 2000; 2010 2020

Horseshoe Bend first appeared as a census designated place in the 2010 U.S. census.

=== 2020 census ===
Horseshoe Bend CDP, Texas – Racial and ethnic composition Note: the US Census treats Hispanic/Latino as an ethnic category. This table excludes Latinos from the racial categories and assigns them to a separate category. Hispanics/Latinos may be of any race.
Race / Ethnicity (NH = Non-Hispanic)	Pop 2010	Pop 2020	% 2010	% 2020
White alone (NH)	685	737	86.82%	77.66%
Black or African American alone (NH)	4	5	0.51%	0.53%
Native American or Alaska Native alone (NH)	9	14	1.14%	1.48%
Asian alone (NH)	3	5	0.38%	0.53%
Native Hawaiian or Pacific Islander alone (NH)	0	0	0.00%	0.00%
Other race alone (NH)	1	1	0.13%	0.11%
Mixed race or Multiracial (NH)	13	53	1.65%	5.58%
Hispanic or Latino (any race)	74	134	9.38%	14.12%
Total	789	949	100.00%	100.00%

At the 2010 United States census there were 789 people, 343 households, and 202 families residing in the CDP. The racial makeup of the CDP was 93.2% White (86.8% Non-Hispanic White), 1.1% Native American, 0.5% African American, 0.4% Asian, 2.9% from other races, and 1.9% from two or more races. Hispanic or Latino of any race were 9.4% of the population.

== Education ==
The Weatherford Independent School District (WISD) serves students living in Horseshoe Bend. Zoned campuses include Wright Elementary School (grades K-6), Hall Middle School (grades 7-8), Weatherford High School Ninth Grade Center (grade 9), and Weatherford High School (grades 10-12).
