= Poolville Independent School District =

School district in Texas

Coordinates: 32.9723°N 97.8608°W

Location
- Poolville, Texas; United States

District information
- Type: Public
- Superintendent: Jeff Kirby

Other information
- Website: www.poolville.net

Poolville Independent School District is a public school district based in the community of Poolville, Texas (USA).

Located in Parker County, a small portion of the district extends into Wise County.

In 2009, the school district was rated "academically acceptable" by the Texas Education Agency.

== Schools ==
- Poolville High School (Grades 9–12)
- Poolville Junior High School (Grades 6–8)
- Poolville Elementary School (Grades PK-5)

Poolville ISD is located northwest of the Dallas/Fort Worth metropolitan area. It has a population as low as 550 students (around 300 in elementary, 100 in junior high, and about 150 in high school).
