= Advance, Texas =

Ghost town in Texas, US

Advance
- Ghost town
- Location within Texas
- Coordinates: 32.9412342°N 97.9272595°W
- Country: United States
- State: Texas
- County: Parker
- Elevation: 1,155 ft (352 m)

Advance is a ghost town in Parker County, Texas, United States. It was settled in 1894, by Adell resident B. B. Barton, who encouraged Adell residents to move to his town. At its peak in the 1890s, it had a population of 20. A post office operated from 1894 to 1906.
