= Western Lake, Texas =

- census-designated place
- Location within Texas
- Coordinates: 32°37′17″N 96°48′58″W
- Country: United States
- State: Texas
- County: Parker

Area
  - Total: 3.52 sq mi (9.1 km^{2})
  - Land: 3.47 sq mi (9.0 km^{2})
  - Water: 0.05 sq mi (0.13 km^{2})
- Elevation: 807 ft (246 m)

Population (2010)
  - Total: 1,525
  - Density: 439/sq mi (170/km^{2})
- Time zone: UTC-6 (Central)
  - Summer (DST): UTC-5 (Central)
- ZIP code: 76087
- Area code: 817
- GNIS feature ID: 2587002

Western Lake is a census-designated place in Parker County, Texas, United States. It was a new CDP for the 2010 census. As of the 2020 census, Western Lake had a population of 1,762.

== Geography ==
Western Lake is located approximately 12 miles south of Weatherford is south central Parker County. It is part of the Dallas–Fort Worth metroplex.

According to the United States Census Bureau, the CDP has a total area of 3.52 square miles (9.1 km^{2}), of which 3.47 square miles (9.0 km^{2}) is land and 0.05 square miles (0.13 km^{2}) is water.

== Demographics ==
Historical population
Census	Pop.	Note	%±
2010	1,525		—
2020	1,762		15.5%
U.S. Decennial Census; 1850–1900 1910; 1920 1930 1940; 1950 1960 1970; 1980 1990 2000; 2010 2020

Western Lake first appeared as a census designated place in the 2010 U.S. census.

=== 2020 census ===
Western Lake CDP, Texas – Racial and ethnic composition Note: the US Census treats Hispanic/Latino as an ethnic category. This table excludes Latinos from the racial categories and assigns them to a separate category. Hispanics/Latinos may be of any race.
Race / Ethnicity (NH = Non-Hispanic)	Pop 2010	Pop 2020	% 2010	% 2020
White alone (NH)	999	854	65.51%	48.47%
Black or African American alone (NH)	9	8	0.59%	0.45%
Native American or Alaska Native alone (NH)	21	8	1.38%	0.45%
Asian alone (NH)	9	6	0.59%	0.34%
Native Hawaiian or Pacific Islander alone (NH)	0	1	0.00%	0.06%
Other race alone (NH)	5	3	0.33%	0.17%
Mixed race or Multiracial (NH)	18	59	1.18%	3.35%
Hispanic or Latino (any race)	464	823	30.43%	46.71%
Total	1,525	1,762	100.00%	100.00%

=== 2010 census ===
At the 2010 United States census there were 1,525 people, 521 households, and 374 families residing in the CDP. The racial makeup of the CDP was 79.4% White (65.5% Non-Hispanic White), 0.6% African American, 0.6% Asian, 1.4% Native American, 15.3% from other races, and 2.8% from two or more races. Hispanic or Latino of any race were 30.4% of the population.

== Education ==
The Weatherford Independent School District (WISD) serves students living in Western Lake. Zoned campuses include Curtis Elementary School (grades K-6), Hall Middle School (grades 7-8), Weatherford High School Ninth Grade Center (grade 9), and Weatherford High School (grades 10-12).
