= Dennis, Texas =

Dennis
- City; Former census designated place
- Location within the state of Texas Dennis (the United States)
- Coordinates: 32°36′21″N 97°56′09″W
- Country: United States
- State: Texas
- County: Parker
- Elevation: 771 ft (235 m)

Population (2020)
  - Total: 727
- Time zone: UTC-6 (Central (CST))
  - Summer (DST): UTC-5 (CDT)
- ZIP codes: 76439
- GNIS feature ID: 2830950

Dennis is a city in Parker County, Texas, United States. On May 6, 2017, voters approved incorporation of Dennis. On September 20, 2022, the U.S. Census Bureau notified the Geographic Names Information Service of the upgrade to city status.

It has a post office, with the ZIP code of 76439.

N. M. Dennis, a local judge, founded the community at the spot of a bridge across the Brazos River in 1892. The community's post office was opened in 1895. Today, FM 1543 passes through the community.

== Demographics ==
Historical population
Census	Pop.	Note	%±
2020	727		—
U.S. Decennial Census; 1850–1900 1910; 1920 1930 1940; 1950 1960 1970; 1980 1990 2000; 2010 2020

Dennis first appeared as a census designated place in the 2020 U.S. census and redesignated a town by the United States Census Bureau in 2023.

=== 2020 Census ===
Dennis CDP, Texas – Racial and ethnic composition Note: the US Census treats Hispanic/Latino as an ethnic category. This table excludes Latinos from the racial categories and assigns them to a separate category. Hispanics/Latinos may be of any race.
Race / Ethnicity (NH = Non-Hispanic)	Pop 2020	% 2020
White alone (NH)	652	89.68%
Black or African American alone (NH)	2	0.28%
Native American or Alaska Native alone (NH)	1	0.14%
Asian alone (NH)	2	0.28%
Native Hawaiian or Pacific Islander alone (NH)	0	0.00%
Other race alone (NH)	2	0.28%
Mixed race or Multiracial (NH)	11	1.51%
Hispanic or Latino (any race)	57	7.84%
Total	727	100.00%

=== 2000 census ===
As of the 2000 census, the community had 90 residents. The town includes a post office, a volunteer fire station, Dennis First Baptist Church, and Sugar Tree Golf Course.

== Education ==
The town is served by the Brock Independent School District.

== History ==
In 1892, after a bridge was built across the Brazos River, Judge N. M. Dennis, a Parker County lawyer and farmer, developed the community to serve the farmers and ranchers of the area.

== Geography ==
Located 32 miles (51 km) southwest of Fort Worth (nearest metropolitan area), 15 miles (24 km) southwest of Weatherford (nearest city), 25 miles (40 km) northwest of Granbury, and 27 miles (43 km) southeast of Mineral Wells; it is sandwiched between the communities of Brock (to the northwest) and Lipan (to the southwest) and Buckner (to the southeast).

The Brazos River runs through the middle of town. The farm to market road (FM) that passes through Dennis is 1189.
