= Cash Jones (American football) =

American football player (born 2002)

Profile
- Position: Running back

Personal information
- Born: April 5, 2002 (age 24)
- Listed height: 5 ft 11 in (1.80 m)
- Listed weight: 195 lb (88 kg)

Career information
- High school: Brock (Brock, Texas)
- College: Georgia (2021–2025)
- NFL draft: 2026: undrafted

Career history
- Atlanta Falcons (2026)*
- * Offseason or practice squad member only

Awards and highlights
- 2× CFP national champion (2021, 2022)
- Stats at Pro Football Reference

Cashion Slade Jones (born April 5, 2002) is an American football running back. He played college football for the Georgia Bulldogs.

== Early life ==
Jones attended Brock High School in Brock, Texas, and committed to play college football for the Georgia Bulldogs as a walk-on.

== College career ==
During his five-year collegiate career from 2021 to 2025, Jones played in 55 games, totaling 253 yards and three touchdowns on 52 carries, while also hauling in 57 receptions for 573 yards and six touchdowns. He helped the team to two National Championships in 2021 and 2022. After the 2025 season, Jones declared for the NFL draft.

== Professional career ==
Pre-draft measurables
Height	Weight	Arm length	Hand span	Wingspan	40-yard dash	10-yard split	20-yard split	20-yard shuttle	Three-cone drill	Vertical jump	Broad jump	Bench press
5 ft 11 in (1.80 m)	185 lb (84 kg)	31 1/8 in (0.79 m)	8 3/4 in (0.22 m)	6 ft 2 1/8 in (1.88 m)	4.45 s	1.54 s	2.54 s	4.31 s	6.88 s	33.5 in (0.85 m)	10 ft 1 in (3.07 m)	20 reps
All values from Pro Day

=== Atlanta Falcons ===
After not being selected in the 2026 NFL draft, Jones signed with the Atlanta Falcons as an undrafted free agent. On August 30, 2026, Jones was waived by Atlanta as a part of final roster cuts; he was re-signed to the team's practice squad the next day.
