= Cool, Texas =

- City
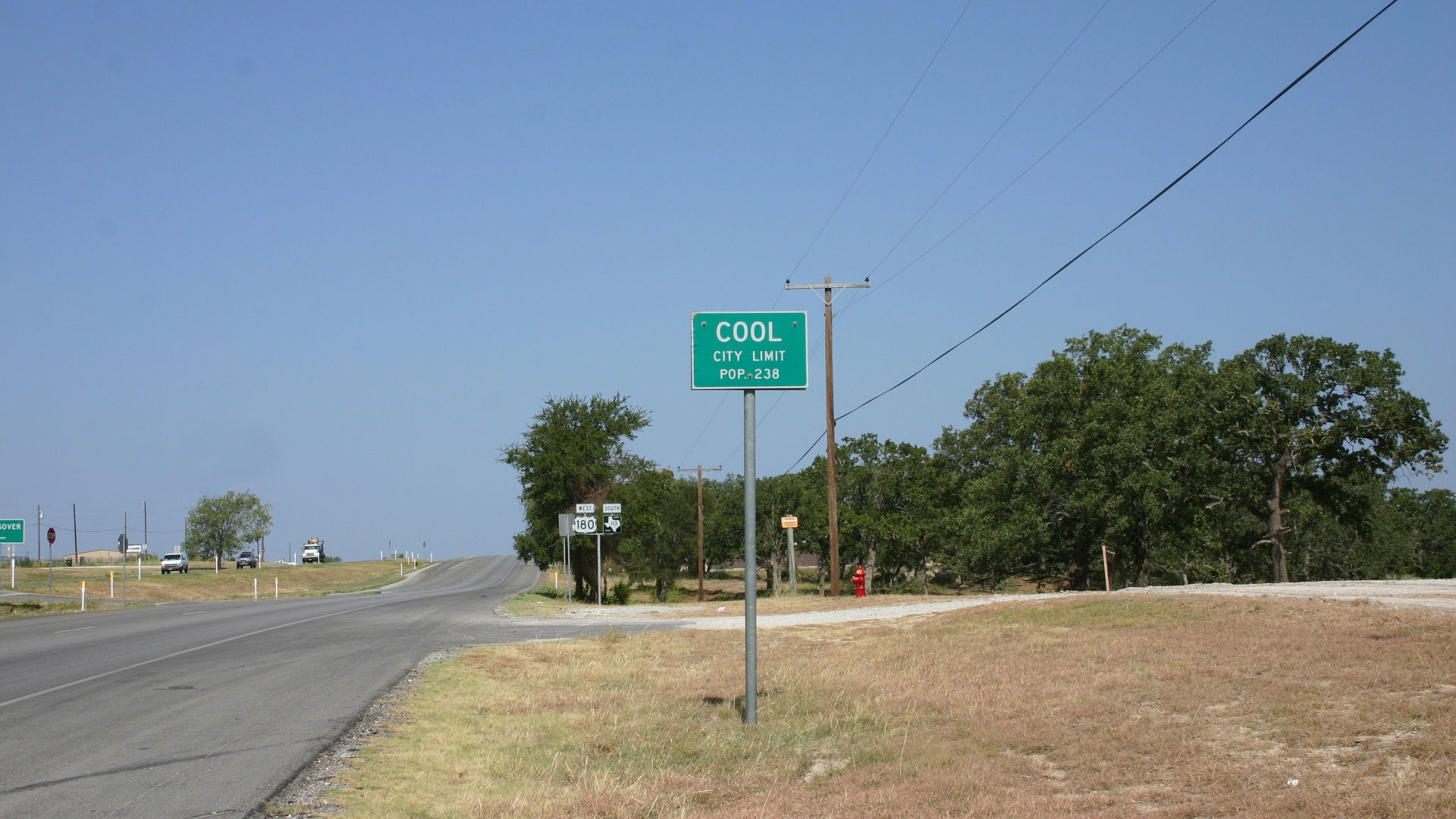
- Westbound on US 183 / FM 113 entering Cool, August 2006

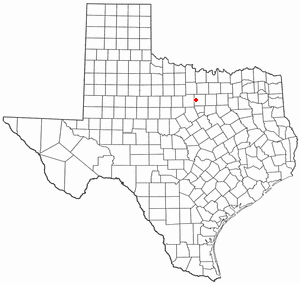
- Location of Cool, Texas

- Coordinates: 32°48′00″N 98°00′18″W
- Country: United States
- State: Texas
- County: Parker

Government
  - Type: General Law
  - Mayor: Dorothy Hall
  - City Commissioner(s): Gail Godfrey and Barbara Rothrock

Area
  - Total: 1.65 sq mi (4.28 km^{2})
  - Land: 1.65 sq mi (4.27 km^{2})
  - Water: 0.0039 sq mi (0.01 km^{2})
- Elevation: 909 ft (277 m)

Population (2024)
  - Total: 211
  - Density: 128.0/sq mi (49.43/km^{2})
- Time zone: UTC-6 (Central (CST))
  - Summer (DST): UTC-5 (CDT)
- FIPS code: 48-16540
- GNIS feature ID: 2410220

Cool is a town in Parker County, Texas, United States. As of the May 2024 US Census estimates, the population of Cool is 242.

The origin of the name "Cool" is not officially recorded; it is believed to have derived from settlers who observed lower temperatures than those in surrounding areas.

== Geography ==
According to the United States Census Bureau, the city has a total area of 1.6 square miles (4.1 km^{2}), all land.

== History ==
Cool was first settled in the late 19th century as part of the broader westward expansion in North Central Texas. The community developed around agriculture, primarily cotton and cattle ranching. The town's name is believed to have originated from a traveler's remark about the area's refreshing conditions, a story that became local legend. A post office was established in 1906, formalizing the name.

Though nearby Mineral Wells grew rapidly due to its mineral springs, Cool remained a small rural settlement throughout the 20th century. Mechanized farming and urban migration led to a gradual population decline after World War II. Interest in rural living brought modest growth in the late 20th century, and the city was officially incorporated in 1990.

== Demographics ==
Historical population
Census	Pop.	Note	%±
1970	237		—
1980	202		−14.8%
1990	214		5.9%
2000	162		−24.3%
2010	157		−3.1%
2020	211		34.4%
U.S. Decennial Census

=== 2020 census ===
As of the 2020 census, Cool had a population of 211. The median age was 47.2 years; 18.0% of residents were under the age of 18, and 26.1% of residents were 65 years of age or older. For every 100 females there were 86.7 males, and for every 100 females age 18 and over there were 86.0 males age 18 and over.

0% of residents lived in urban areas, while 100.0% lived in rural areas.

There were 85 households in Cool, of which 25.9% had children under the age of 18 living in them. Of all households, 48.2% were married-couple households, 18.8% were households with a male householder and no spouse or partner present, and 27.1% were households with a female householder and no spouse or partner present. About 14.2% of all households were made up of individuals, and 7.1% had someone living alone who was 65 years of age or older.

There were 104 housing units, of which 18.3% were vacant. Among occupied housing units, 83.5% were owner-occupied, and 16.5% were renter-occupied. The homeowner vacancy rate was 3.9%, and the rental vacancy rate was < 0.1%.

Racial composition as of the 2020 census
Race	Number	Percent
White	178	84.4%
Black or African American	3	1.4%
American Indian and Alaska Native	1	0.5%
Asian	1	0.5%
Native Hawaiian and Other Pacific Islander	0	0%
Some other race	14	6.6%
Two or more races	14	6.6%
Hispanic or Latino (of any race)	31	14.7%

=== 2000 census ===
As of the 2000 census, there were 162 people, 62 households, and 49 families residing in the city. The population density was 98.9 inhabitants per square mile (38.2/km^{2}). There were 69 housing units at an average density of 42.1 per square mile (16.3/km^{2}). The racial makeup of the city was 96.91% White, 2.47% from other races, and 0.62% from two or more races. Hispanic or Latino of any race were 3.70% of the population.

There were 62 households, out of which 32.3% had children under the age of 18 living with them, 64.5% were married couples living together, 11.3% had a female householder with no husband present, and 19.4% were non-families. 17.7% of all households were made up of individuals, and 8.1% had someone living alone who was 65 years of age or older. The average household size was 2.61, and the average family size was 2.92.

In the city, the population was distributed as follows: 24.7% under 18, 4.3% from 18 to 24, 27.8% from 25 to 44, 22.8% from 45 to 64, and 20.4% 65 years of age or older. The median age was 41 years. For every 100 females, there were 90.6 males. For every 100 females age 18 and over, there were 96.8 males.

The median income for a household in the city was $30,938, and the median income for a family was $31,875. Males had a median income of $36,875 versus $22,917 for females. The per capita income for the city was $14,112. About 16.4% of families and 20.9% of the population were below the poverty line, including 26.7% of those under the age of eighteen and 15.2% of those 65 or over.

== Education ==
Public education in the city of Cool is provided by the Millsap Independent School District.

== Notable people ==
- Joe Wimberly (born 1961), Rodeo Cowboy Hall of Famer

== See also ==
- List of municipalities in Texas
