= Millsap Independent School District =

School district in Texas

Millsap Independent School District is a public school district based in Millsap, Texas, United States.

Millsap ISD covers a 124-square-mile (320 km^{2}) area in west-central Parker County, about 9 miles east of Mineral Wells and 15 mi (24 km) west of Weatherford. A very small portion of the district extends into Palo Pinto County. In addition to Millsap, the district also serves the town of Cool.

In 2009, the school district was rated "academically acceptable" by the Texas Education Agency.

== Schools ==
- Millsap High School (grades 9–12)
- Millsap Middle School (grades 6–8)
- Millsap Elementary School (prekindergarten-grade 5)

== See also ==
- List of school districts in Texas
