= Sawyer Strosnider =

American baseball player (born 2005)

Milwaukee Brewers
- Outfielder
- Born: June 26, 2005 (age 21); Cincinnati, Ohio, U.S.
- Bats: Left Throws: Left
- Stats at Baseball Reference

Sawyer Paul Strosnider (born June 26, 2005) is an American professional baseball outfielder in the Milwaukee Brewers organization.

== Career ==
Strosnider was born on June 26, 2005, in Cincinnati, Ohio. He grew up playing baseball, following after his father, who played in college. His family later moved to Texas, where he attended Brock High School and played as an outfielder, becoming a highly-ranked recruit. Strosnider was a three-time all-state selection, the 8-3A MVP and first-team all-district at Brock. As a senior, he batted .547. Sawyer was considered a prospect for the 2024 Major League Baseball draft, but instead decided to play college baseball for the TCU Horned Frogs.

Strosnider became TCU's starting right fielder as a freshman in 2025, although late in the season he served only as a designated hitter due to injuries. He batted .350 and had an on-base percentage of .420, while hitting 13 doubles, 10 triples and 11 home runs with 51 runs batted in (RBIs). Strosnider was the national leader in triples and also posted 10 stolen bases, becoming one of only four players since 2002 at the NCAA Division I level to record 10 or more home runs, doubles, triples and stolen bases in a season. His batting average led the team while his 10 triples broke the school single-season record. For his performance, Strosnider was named first-team All-Big 12 Conference, to the Big 12 All-Freshman and All-Tournament teams, the Big 12 Freshman of the Year, first-team All-American and the Perfect Game National Freshman of the Year.

Strosnider was regarded as a top prospect for the 2026 Major League Baseball draft. He was selected by the Milwaukee Brewers in the second round with the 66th overall pick.
