= Carter, Texas =

- Census-designated place
- Location within Texas Location within the United States
- Coordinates: 32°54′32″N 97°44′39″W
- Country: United States
- State: Texas
- County: Parker

Area
  - Total: 6.44 sq mi (16.68 km^{2})
  - Land: 6.43 sq mi (16.65 km^{2})
  - Water: 0.015 sq mi (0.04 km^{2})
- Elevation: 1,129 ft (344 m)

Population (2020)
  - Total: 1,637
- Time zone: UTC-6 (Central (CST))
  - Summer (DST): UTC-5 (CDT)
- ZIP Codes: 76082 (Springtown); 76085 (Weatherford)
- Area codes: 817, 682
- FIPS code: 48-13075
- GNIS feature ID: 2805831

Carter is an unincorporated area and census-designated place (CDP) in Parker County, Texas, United States. It was first listed as a CDP prior to the 2020 census. As of the 2020 census, Carter had a population of 1,637.

It is in the northern part of the county, spread over several low ridges and valleys draining south to the Clear Fork of the Trinity River and north to Walnut Creek, a tributary of the West Fork of the Trinity River. Texas State Highway 51 passes through the east side of the CDP, leading northeast 5 miles (8 km) to Springtown and southwest 10 miles (16 km) to Weatherford, the Parker county seat. Fort Worth is 29 miles (47 km) to the southeast.

== Demographics ==
Historical population
Census	Pop.	Note	%±
2020	1,637		—
U.S. Decennial Census; 1850–1900 1910; 1920 1930 1940; 1950 1960 1970; 1980 1990 2000; 2010 2020

Carter first appeared as a census designated place in the 2020 U.S. census.

=== 2020 Census ===
Carter CDP, Texas – Racial and ethnic composition Note: the US Census treats Hispanic/Latino as an ethnic category. This table excludes Latinos from the racial categories and assigns them to a separate category. Hispanics/Latinos may be of any race.
Race / Ethnicity (NH = Non-Hispanic)	Pop 2020	% 2020
White alone (NH)	1,134	69.27%
Black or African American alone (NH)	14	0.86%
Native American or Alaska Native alone (NH)	9	0.55%
Asian alone (NH)	10	0.61%
Native Hawaiian or Pacific Islander alone (NH)	1	0.06%
Other race alone (NH)	13	0.79%
Mixed race or Multiracial (NH)	125	7.64%
Hispanic or Latino (any race)	331	20.22%
Total	1,637	100.00%
