= Adell, Texas =

Ghost town in Texas, US

Adell
- Ghost town
- Location within Texas
- Coordinates: 32.8845696°N 97.9222597°W
- Country: United States
- State: Texas
- County: Parker
- Named for: Adell Sanger
- Elevation: 1,073 ft (327 m)

Adell is a ghost town in Parker County, Texas, United States. Situated on Farm to Market Road 1885, it was settled in the late 1880s. A post office operated from 1890 to 1904. The town was supposedly named by suggestion of merchant Alex Sanger, who wanted it named after his daughter Adell.
