= Annetta South, Texas =

- Town
- Seal
- Interactive map of Annetta South, Texas
- Coordinates: 32°40′12″N 97°37′55″W
- Country: United States
- State: Texas
- County: Parker

Area
  - Total: 1.93 sq mi (5.01 km^{2})
  - Land: 1.91 sq mi (4.95 km^{2})
  - Water: 0.023 sq mi (0.06 km^{2})
- Elevation: 883 ft (269 m)

Population (2020)
  - Total: 621
  - Density: 325/sq mi (125/km^{2})
- Time zone: UTC-6 (Central (CST))
  - Summer (DST): UTC-5 (CDT)
- FIPS code: 48-03342
- GNIS feature ID: 2412366
- Website: annettasouth.org

Annetta South is a town in Parker County, Texas, United States. The population was 621 in 2020.

The town split from Annetta and incorporated in the 1980s, at which time it had a population of 115.

== Geography ==
According to the United States Census Bureau, the town has a total area of 1.9 square miles (4.9 km^{2}), of which 1.9 square miles (4.9 km^{2}) is land and 0.04 square miles (0.10 km^{2}) (1.04%) is water.

== Demographics ==
Historical population
Census	Pop.	Note	%±
1980	249		—
1990	413		65.9%
2000	555		34.4%
2010	526		−5.2%
2020	621		18.1%
U.S. Decennial Census

Annetta South racial composition as of 2020 (NH = Non-Hispanic) (Note: Note: the US Census treats Hispanic/Latino as an ethnic category. This table excludes Latinos from the racial categories and assigns them to a separate category. Hispanics/Latinos can be of any race.)
Race	Number	Percentage
White (NH)	529	85.19%
Black or African American (NH)	5	0.81%
Native American or Alaska Native (NH)	5	0.81%
Asian (NH)	2	0.32%
Some Other Race (NH)	1	0.16%
Mixed/Multi-Racial (NH)	19	3.06%
Hispanic or Latino	60	9.66%
Total	621	

As of the 2020 United States census, there were 621 people, 207 households, and 183 families residing in the town.

== Education ==
The Town of Annetta South is served by the Aledo Independent School District.
