= Goshen, Parker County, Texas =

Goshen
- Unincorporated community
- Interactive map of Goshen
- Coordinates: 32°57′39″N 97°44′48″W
- Country: United States
- State: Texas
- County: Parker
- Elevation: 1,079 ft (329 m)

Goshen is an unincorporated community in Parker County, Texas, United States. The community developed around a Methodist church.

== See also ==
- Goshen
