= Brock Independent School District =

School district in Texas, United States

Coordinates: 32°40′15″N 97°55′46″W

Address
- 410 Eagle Spirit Ln Brock, Parker County, Texas, 76087; USA

District information
- Type: Public
- Motto: Home of Champions
- Grades: Pre-K through 12
- Superintendent: Cade Smith
- Governing agency: Texas Education Agency, Region 11
- Budget: $11.1 million (2015-2016)
- NCES District ID: 4811460

Students and staff
- Students: 1,373 (2017-2018)
- Teachers: 94.29 (2017-2018)
- Staff: 165.60 (2017-2018)

Other information
- Website: www.brockisd.net

Brock Independent School District is a public school district based in the community of Brock, Texas (USA).

Brock's basketball programs (girl's and boy's) have been perennial state powers, including an unusual "double-double" in 2001-2002 and 2002-2003, when both the girl's and boy's teams won consecutive titles. The feat was even more unusual in that, in February 2002, Brock was realigned upward in classification from Class A to Class AA (for the 2002-2003 season), moving it from being one of the largest Class A schools to one of the smallest Class AA schools, yet playing against larger Class AA schools Brock still managed to have both teams repeat as state champions. Brock moved up to Class AAA before the 2014-2015 season. Brock has won 11 state titles overall in basketball: girls in 2002, 2003, 2005, 2009, 2010, 2011, 2012, and 2013 and boys in 2002, 2003, and 2015. Brock has since won a state championship in every sport offered; baseball, softball, volleyball, cross country, track, golf, and tennis. Until 2011 Brock was one of the few districts in Texas that did not participate in high school football. In 2011, Brock began playing football at the junior high level, and in 2012 began playing high school football at the junior varsity level; in 2014 the program became varsity level; and a year after, Brock football won state.

In 2009, the school district was rated "recognized" by the Texas Education Agency.

== Schools ==
- Brock High School (Grades 9-12)
- Brock Junior High School (Grades 7-8)
- Brock Intermediate School (Grades 3-6)
- Brock Elementary School (Grades PK-2)

== Students ==
=== Academics ===
STAAR - Percent at Level II Satisfactory Standard or Above (Sum of All Grades Tested)
Subject	Brock ISD	Region 11	State of Texas
Reading	88%	76%	73%
Mathematics	88%	78%	76%
Writing	80%	72%	69%
Science	94%	81%	79%
Soc. Studies	95%	80%	77%
All Tests	89%	77%	75%

Students in Brock greatly outperform local region and statewide averages on standardized tests. In 2015-2016 State of Texas Assessments of Academic Readiness (STAAR) results, 89% of students in Brock ISD met Level II Satisfactory standards, compared with 77% in Region 11 and 75% in the state of Texas. The average SAT score of the class of 2015 was 1542, and the average ACT score was 22.6.

=== Demographics ===
In the 2015-2016 school year, the school district had a total of 1,295 students, ranging from early childhood education and pre-kindergarten through grade 12. The class of 2015 included 70 graduates; the annual drop-out rate across grades 9-12 was 0.0%.

As of the 2015-2016 school year, the ethnic distribution of the school district was 87.5% White, 8.6% Hispanic, 0.9% African American, 0.2% Asian, 0.3% American Indian, 0.1% Pacific Islander, and 2.4% from two or more races. Economically disadvantaged students made up 12.2% of the student body.
