= Hudson Oaks, Texas =

- City
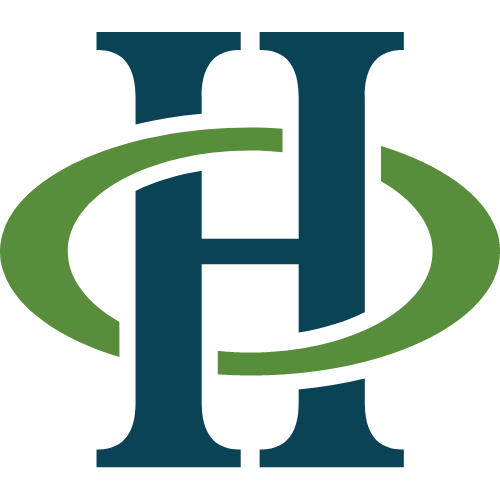
- Logo

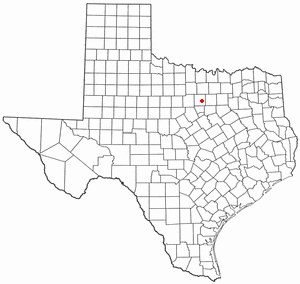
- Location of Hudson Oaks, Texas

- Coordinates: 32°44′52″N 97°41′52″W
- Country: United States
- State: Texas
- County: Parker

Area
  - Total: 3.10 sq mi (8.02 km^{2})
  - Land: 3.10 sq mi (8.02 km^{2})
  - Water: 0 sq mi (0.00 km^{2})
- Elevation: 1,014 ft (309 m)

Population (2020)
  - Total: 2,174
  - Density: 702/sq mi (271/km^{2})
- Time zone: UTC-6 (Central (CST))
  - Summer (DST): UTC-5 (CDT)
- ZIP code: 76087
- Area codes: 817, 682
- FIPS code: 48-35254
- GNIS feature ID: 2410801
- Website: hudsonoaks.com

Hudson Oaks is a city in Parker County, Texas, United States located in the Dallas-Fort Worth Metroplex. The population was 2,174 in 2020.

== History ==
Hudson Oaks was founded in 1978. The city currently has a 15 man Police Department and contracts with Weatherford Fire Department. The city is made up of several affluent sub-divisions to include, Red Eagle, Diamond Oaks, Parker Oaks, Enchanted Oaks and Red Oak Hills.

In 1969, shortly before the city was incorporated, Highway Patrolman Douglas Thompson was struck and killed by a hit-and-run driver. A memorial for Patrolman Thompson is held annually.

Hudson Oaks has been the site of two notable differing family murder-suicides, one occurring in Hudson Oaks and the other just outside of the city limits. Both occurring in the 2000s.

In 2019, the successful HEB grocery chain opened up their eighth North Texas location in Hudson Oaks. The city has boasted a number of new businesses which have coined them the nickname, The Entertainment Capital of Parker County. The city also has an annual fireworks show termed Boomin' Fourth and a Christmas festival named COHOHO.

History was made in 2022 when Hudson Oaks connected to the City of Fort Worth's 36 inch main water line which now provides water to the city. Prior to this change, Hudson Oaks and nearby Willow Park had been using Lake Weatherford for water supplies.

=== Murder of the Perez Children ===
On July 16, 2002, Dee Etta Perez shot and killed her three children before shooting her husband in the back during a scheduled visit. She then shot herself. Her husband called the police and was taken to hospital where he survived his wounds. The authorities entered the home and found the bodies of her children in their bunk beds. A funeral was held for the children, and hundreds of mourners came to pay their respects.

=== Estrada family murders ===
The second family murder-suicide occurred on May 29, 2007, where Gilberta Estrada, a depressed young mother, hanged her four daughters in the closet, before hanging herself. Gilberta’s sister, concerned for her sister, went to Estrada’s mobile home to check on her, and found the grisly sight. Miraculously, the youngest daughter was found alive, and was rushed to the hospital. The baby’s survival was called a miracle, as doctors noted numerous factors to the survival, and that there were no long term effects from the hanging. The murders brought up the discussion of depression in young mothers.

== Geography ==
According to the United States Census Bureau, the city has a total area of 2.5 square miles (6.5 km^{2}), all land.

The city is located in between Weatherford and Willow Park. IH-20 splits the city into two sections, north and south. These sections include many residential neighborhoods and a robust selection of businesses. Hudson Oaks is roughly 20 miles west of Fort Worth and 40 miles west of Dallas.

Hudson Oaks has three highways that intersect in the city, IH-20, Bankhead Highway and US 180.

== Demographics ==
Historical population
Census	Pop.	Note	%±
1980	488		—
1990	711		45.7%
2000	1,637		130.2%
2010	1,662		1.5%
2020	2,174		30.8%
2023 (est.)	2,656		22.2%
U.S. Decennial Census; 2020

=== 2020 census ===
As of the 2020 census, Hudson Oaks had a population of 2,174, a median age of 46.2 years, 22.5% of residents were under the age of 18, and 18.8% were 65 years of age or older. For every 100 females there were 96.4 males, and for every 100 females age 18 and over there were 97.7 males age 18 and over.

There were 779 households, of which 30.9% had children under the age of 18 living in them. Of all households, 75.2% were married-couple households, 9.4% were households with a male householder and no spouse or partner present, and 11.8% were households with a female householder and no spouse or partner present. About 11.3% of all households were made up of individuals and 5.4% had someone living alone who was 65 years of age or older. There were 811 housing units, of which 3.9% were vacant. The homeowner vacancy rate was 0.9% and the rental vacancy rate was 6.8%.

98.8% of residents lived in urban areas, while 1.2% lived in rural areas.

Racial composition as of the 2020 census
Race	Number	Percent
White	1,837	84.5%
Black or African American	27	1.2%
American Indian and Alaska Native	14	0.6%
Asian	15	0.7%
Native Hawaiian and Other Pacific Islander	2	0.1%
Some other race	60	2.8%
Two or more races	219	10.1%
Hispanic or Latino (of any race)	212	9.8%

(Note: Note: the US Census treats Hispanic/Latino as an ethnic category. This table excludes Latinos from the racial categories and assigns them to a separate category. Hispanics/Latinos can be of any race.)

== Education ==
Hudson Oaks is served by the Weatherford and Aledo Independent School Districts.
