= Annetta North, Texas =

- Town
- Seal
- Interactive map of Annetta North, Texas
- Coordinates: 32°43′13″N 97°40′52″W
- Country: United States
- State: Texas
- County: Parker

Area
  - Total: 3.78 sq mi (9.78 km^{2})
  - Land: 3.78 sq mi (9.78 km^{2})
  - Water: 0 sq mi (0.00 km^{2})
- Elevation: 860 ft (262 m)

Population (2020)
  - Total: 554
  - Density: 147/sq mi (56.6/km^{2})
- Time zone: UTC-6 (CST)
  - Summer (DST): UTC-5 (CDT)
- FIPS code: 48-03340
- GNIS feature ID: 2412365
- Website: annettanorth.com

Annetta North is a town in eastern Parker County, Texas, United States, on FM 5. The population was 554 in 2020.

The Town of Annetta North split from Annetta and was incorporated on August 11, 1979. Phyllis M. Studer was elected as its first mayor. As of April 2018 the mayor is Robert Schmidt.

Annetta North is a small town that is mostly residential and farmland. There is only one church building, and the only other public places in the town are a car repair shop and riding arena. Both the Clear Fork and the South Fork of the Trinity River pass through the town, as well as Burgess Creek and the Dixon Branch. O'Neal Cemetery is located within the town limits as well.

== Geography ==
According to the United States Census Bureau, the town has a total area of 3.3 square miles (8.5 km^{2}), all land.

Annetta North has a humid and subtropical climate, with an annual average temperature of 64 °F. Annetta North also has an average high of 76 °F, and a low of 51 °F. The annual precipitation average is 33.1", while the average snowfall is 0.216".

Climate data for Annetta North, Texas United States
| Month | Jan | Feb | Mar | Apr | May | Jun | Jul | Aug | Sep | Oct | Nov | Dec | Year |
|---|---|---|---|---|---|---|---|---|---|---|---|---|---|
| Mean daily maximum °F (°C) | 59 (15) | 62 (17) | 73 (23) | 82 (28) | 86 (30) | 89 (32) | 97 (36) | 98 (37) | 89 (32) | 82 (28) | 70 (21) | 59 (15) | 79 (26) |
| Mean daily minimum °F (°C) | 33 (1) | 33 (1) | 44 (7) | 53 (12) | 62 (17) | 70 (21) | 73 (23) | 70 (21) | 64 (18) | 53 (12) | 52 (11) | 37 (3) | 54 (12) |
| Average precipitation inches (mm) | 4.4 (110) | 1.8 (46) | 3.3 (84) | 2.8 (71) | 3.8 (97) | 3.8 (97) | 2.1 (53) | 2.5 (64) | 3.2 (81) | 2.7 (69) | 2.3 (58) | 2.3 (58) | 35 (888) |
Source: Annetta North (Cebuano)

== Demographics ==
Historical population
| Census | Pop. | Note | %± |
|---|---|---|---|
| 1980 | 222 | | — |
| 1990 | 265 | | 19.4% |
| 2000 | 467 | | 76.2% |
| 2010 | 518 | | 10.9% |
| 2020 | 554 | | 6.9% |
U.S. Decennial Census

Annetta North racial composition as of 2020 (NH = Non-Hispanic) (Note: Note: the US Census treats Hispanic/Latino as an ethnic category. This table excludes Latinos from the racial categories and assigns them to a separate category. Hispanics/Latinos can be of any race.)
| Race | Number | Percentage |
|---|---|---|
| White (NH) | 491 | 88.63% |
| Black or African American (NH) | 13 | 2.35% |
| Native American or Alaska Native (NH) | 1 | 0.18% |
| Pacific Islander (NH) | 1 | 0.18% |
| Mixed/Multi-Racial (NH) | 18 | 3.25% |
| Hispanic or Latino | 30 | 5.42% |
| Total | 554 | |

As of the 2020 United States census, there were 554 people, 167 households, and 132 families residing in the town.

== Education ==
Annetta North is served by the Aledo and Weatherford Independent School Districts.
