= Weatherford High School (Texas) =

Location
- 2121 Bethel Rd. Weatherford, Texas 76087; United States; 32.72505°N 97.80629°W

Information
- School type: Public High School
- Motto: Your Child: Our Mission
- School district: Weatherford Independent
- Principal: Tommaney
- Teaching staff: 168.93 (FTE)
- Grades: 10-12
- Enrollment: 2,487 (2023-2024)
- Student to teacher ratio: 14.72
- Colors: Blue & White
- Athletics conference: UIL Class AAAAAA
- Mascot: Kangaroo
- Yearbook: Melon Vine
- Website: Weatherford High School

Weatherford High School is a public high school located in Weatherford, Texas, United States. It is part of the Weatherford Independent School District located in central Parker County and classified as a 6A school by the University Interscholastic League (UIL). In 2015, the school was rated "Met Standard" by the Texas Education Agency.

== Athletics ==
The Weatherford Kangaroos compete in these sports -

Cross Country, Volleyball, Football, Basketball, Wrestling, Powerlifting, Soccer, Golf, Tennis, Track, Softball, and Baseball.

=== State Titles ===
- Softball
  - 2000(4A)

==== State Finalists ====
- Baseball
  - 1982(4A)
- Softball
  - 1999(4A)

== Notable alumni ==
- Buck Britton - MLB coach
- Zach Britton – MLB pitcher
- Beau Burrows – pitcher in the Detroit Tigers organization
- Blair Cherry – baseball and football coach at University of Texas-Austin
- Hank Gremminger – NFL defensive back (1956–66)
- Larry Hagman – film and television actor, best known for starring in TV series Dallas and I Dream of Jeannie
- Hayden Hansen - college football tight end for the Oklahoma Sooners
- Colt Hynes – MLB pitcher
- Kapron Lewis-Moore - NFL defensive end
- Ken Seals - former football player for the TCU Horned Frogs
- Ray Schoenke – NFL player and entrepreneur
- Brina Palencia – actress and voice actress
- Drew Springer – Texas Senator, 30th district
