= Poolville, Texas =

- Unincorporated community
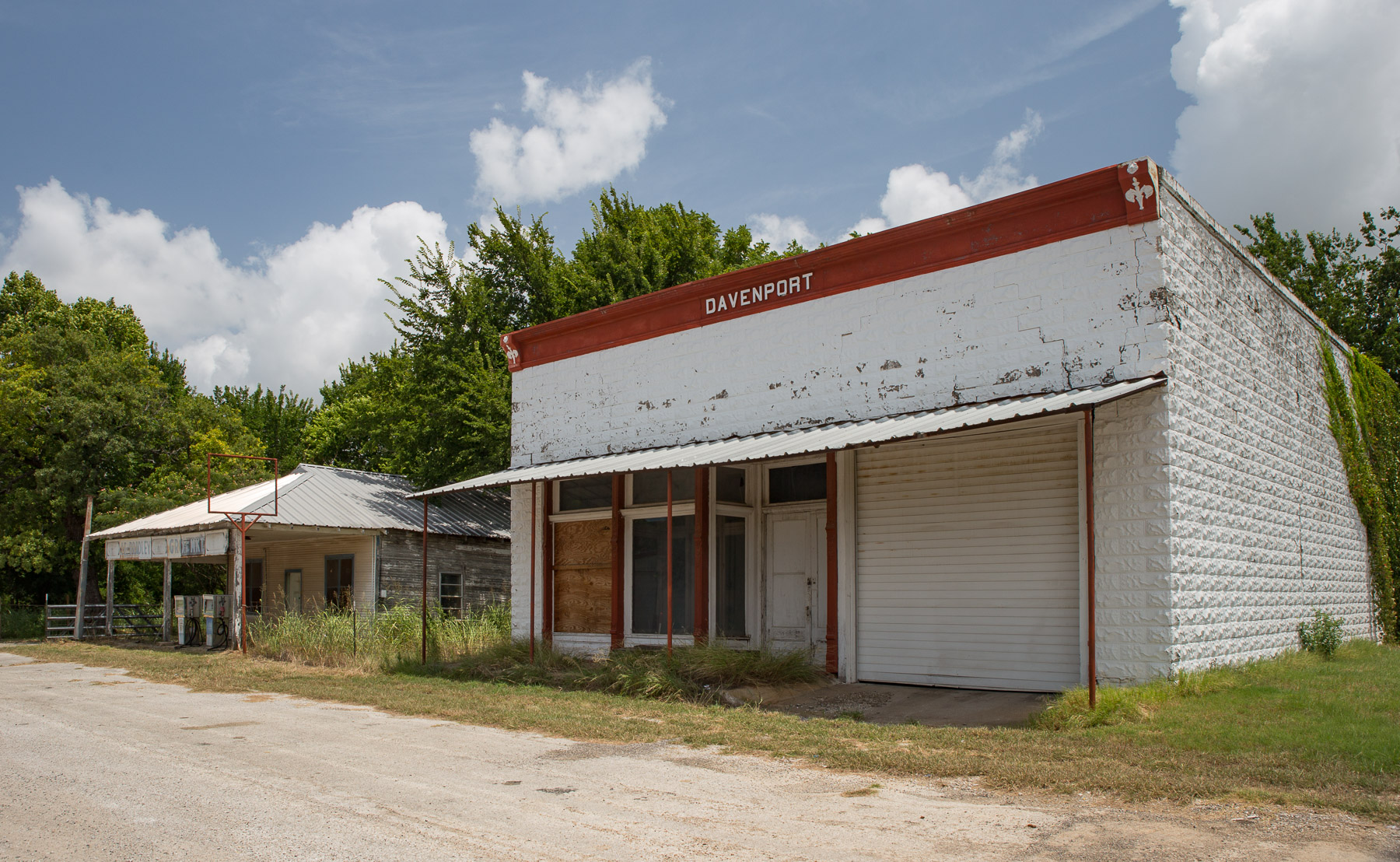
- Davenport Building

- Location within the state of Texas Poolville, Texas (the United States)
- Coordinates: 32°58′30″N 97°51′29″W
- Country: United States
- State: Texas
- County: Parker, Wise
- Elevation: 1,132 ft (345 m)
- Time zone: UTC-6 (Central (CST))
  - Summer (DST): UTC-5 (CDT)
- ZIP codes: 76487
- GNIS feature ID: 1344355

Poolville is an unincorporated community in Parker County, Texas, United States. Its population was 2,707. Poolville is located along Farm to Market Road 920 and Zion Hill, about seventeen miles north of Weatherford, the county seat.

== History ==
It has a post office (ZIP Code 76487).

On February 22, 1996, an eight-month drought brought fires to Poolville, destroying hundreds to thousands of acres of land.

On March 24, 2023, an EF1 tornado struck the northwest side of Poolville, which destroyed the historic 120-year-old Tabernacle.

On April 19, 2025, another EF1 Tornado struck South of Poolville, damaging outbuildings along Farm to Market Road 920.

== Climate ==
The climate in this area is characterized by relatively high temperatures and evenly distributed precipitation throughout the year. The Köppen Climate System describes the weather as humid subtropical, and uses the abbreviation Cfa.

== Demographics ==
There are five churches: Methodist, Southern Baptist, Church of Christ, The Lone Star Church of Poolville Texas, and Oak Tree Baptist Church. The United Methodist and the Church of Christ Church buildings are located just west of the town square behind the seed company.

== Education ==
The Poolville Independent School District has three campuses.

== Notable people ==
- Orville Bullington, a Wichita Falls attorney and the 1932 Republican gubernatorial nominee against Miriam A. Ferguson, was raised in Poolville.

== Gallery ==
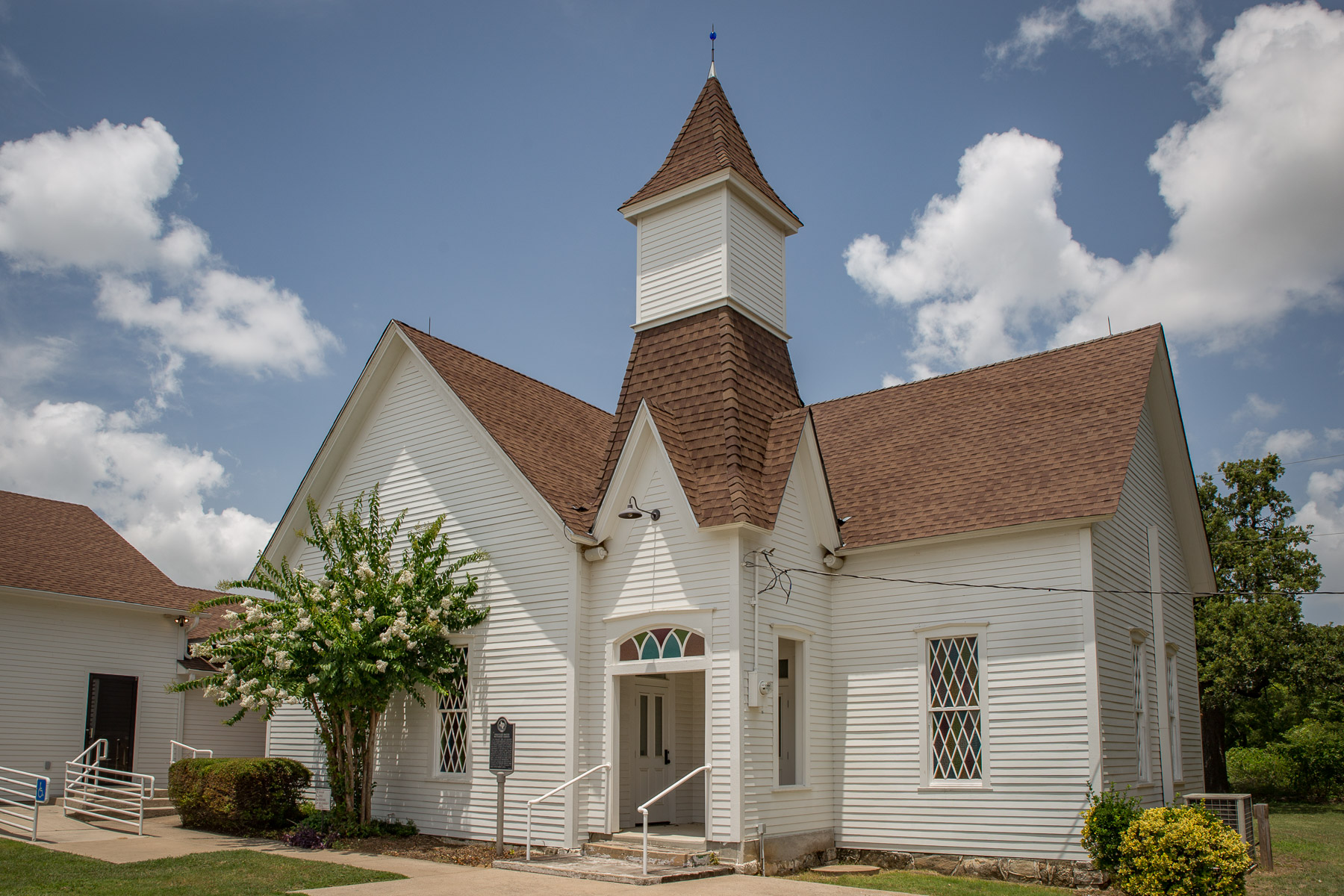
Poolville United Methodist Church

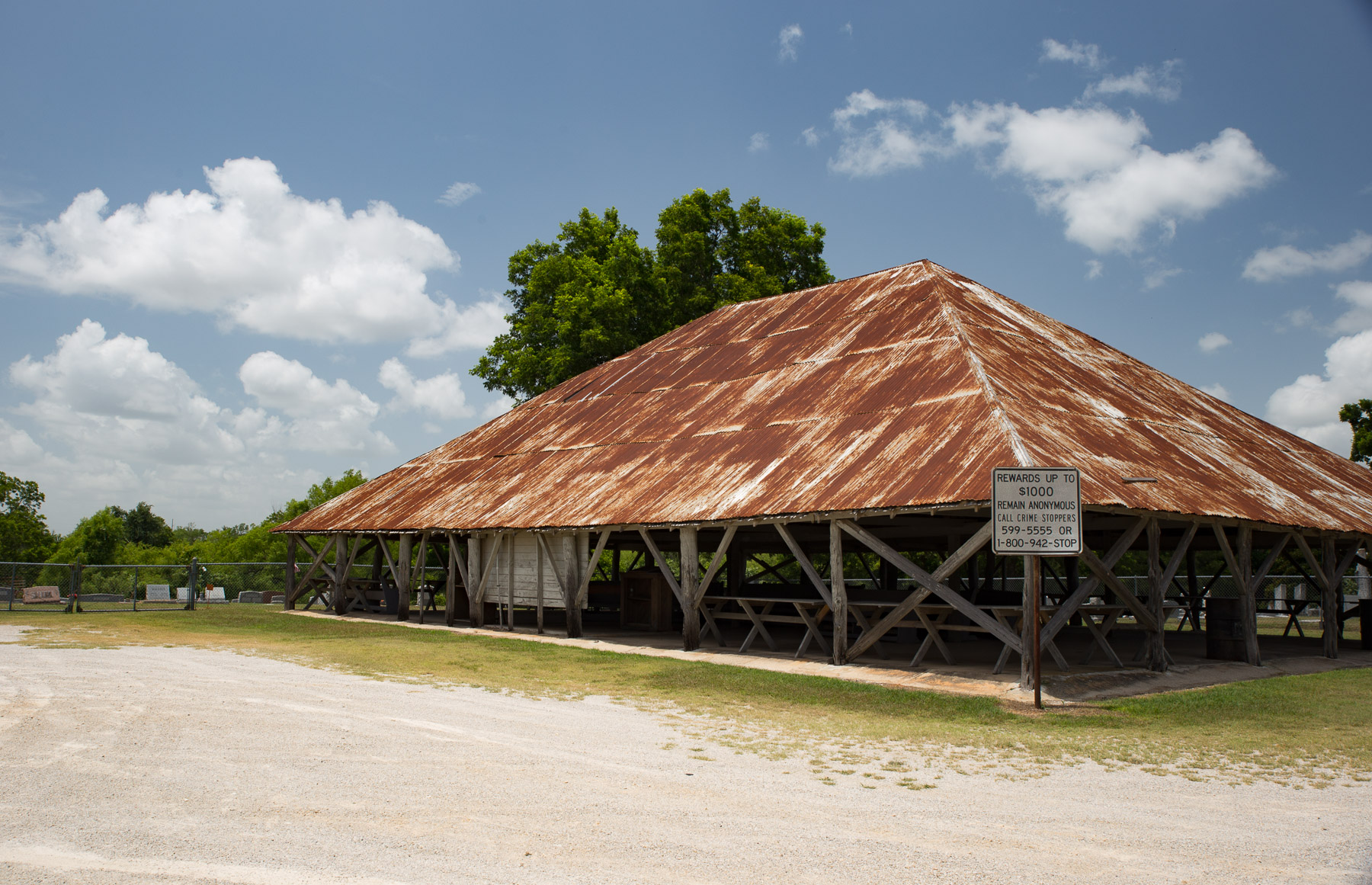
Poolville Tabernacle

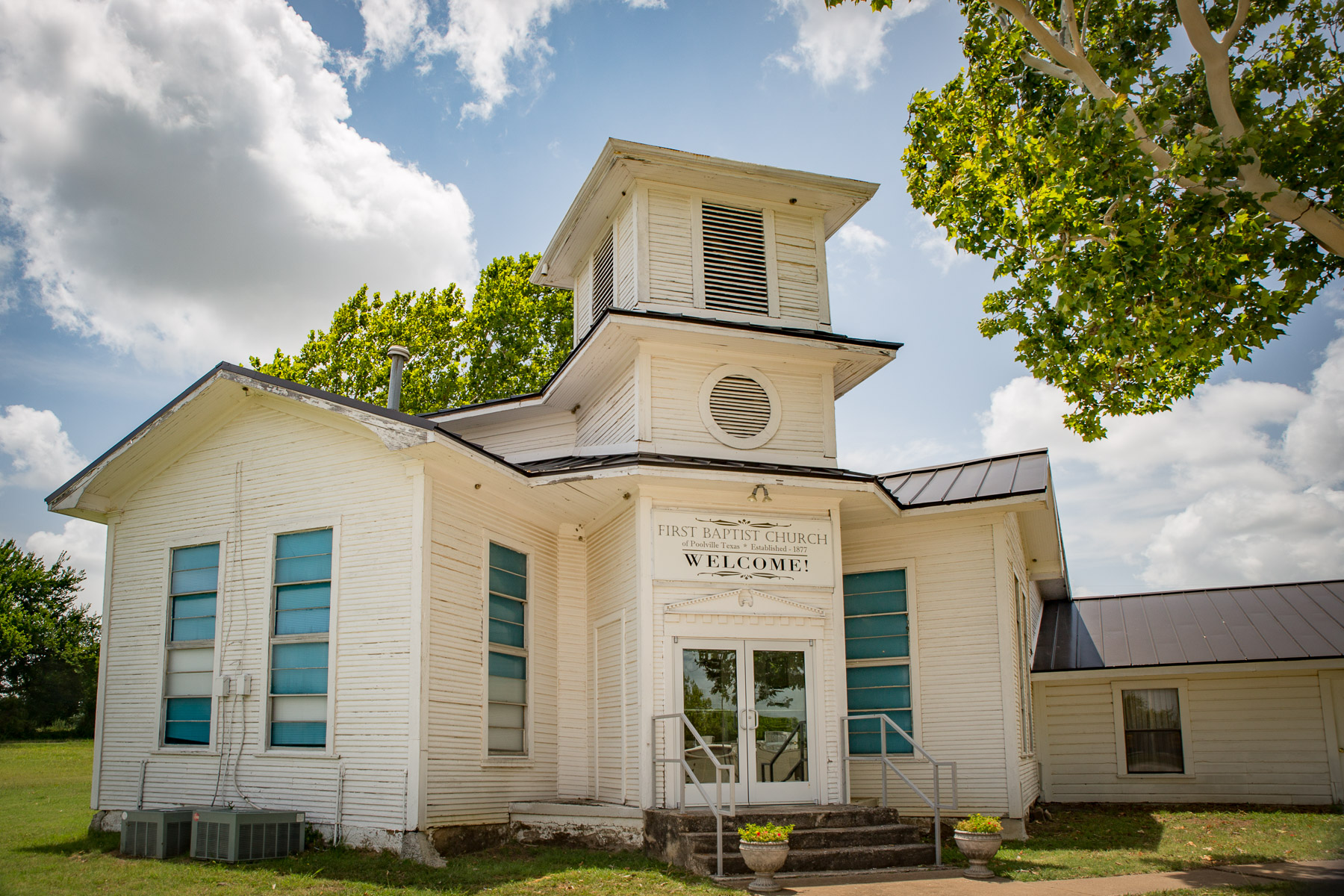
First Baptist Church
