= Jesse Jackson Millsaps =

American politician from Arkansas (1827-1900)

Arkansas General Assembly

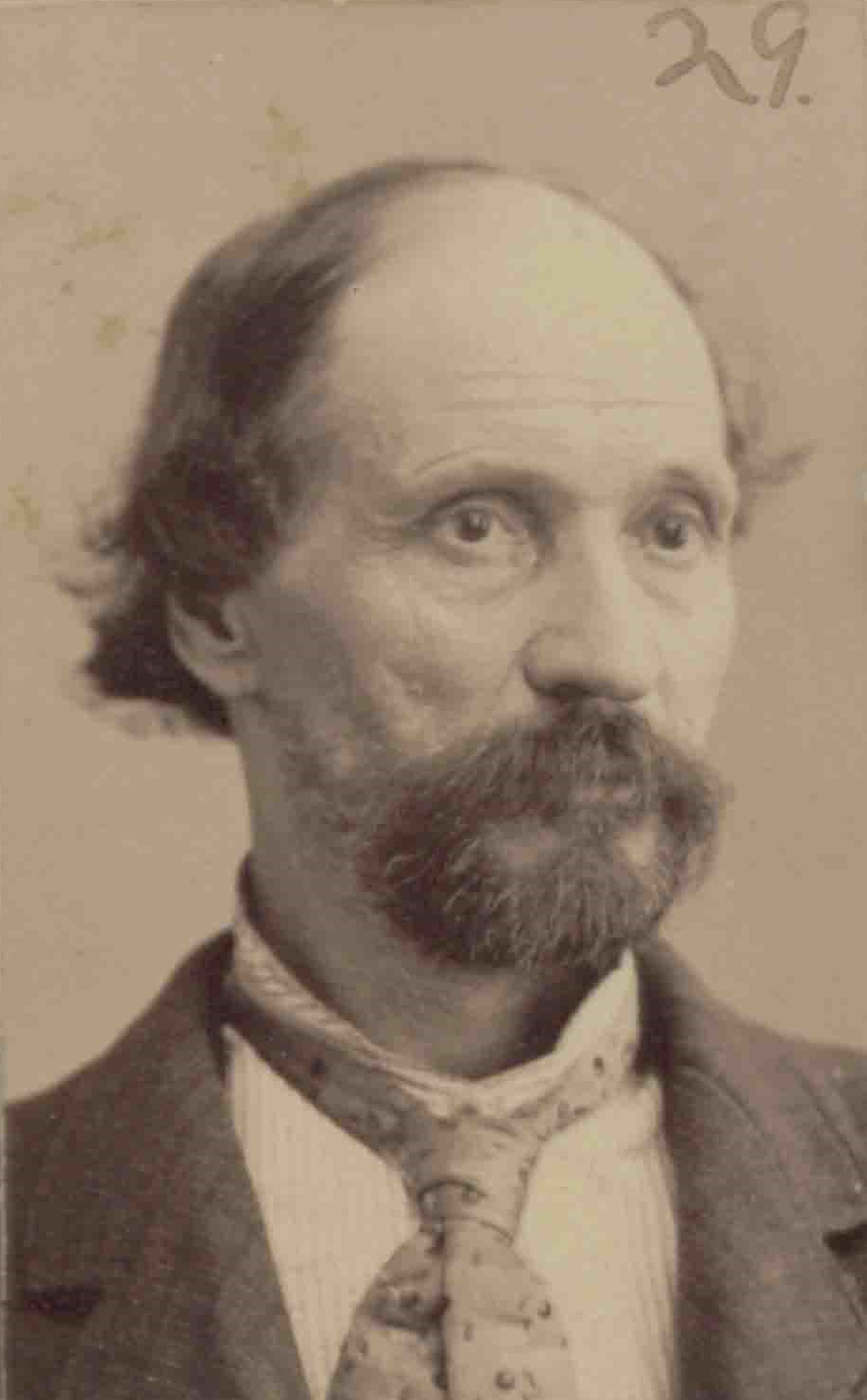

Jesse Jackson Millsaps (March 26, 1827 – January 9, 1900) was an officer in the Union Army during the American Civil War, a farmer, and a state legislator who served in the Arkansas House of Representatives representing Van Buren County, Arkansas in 1868 and 1885.

Millsaps was a member of the 1868 Arkansas Constitutional Convention, where he was listed as a 41 year old farmer who had been in Arkansas for eight years.

He was also a member of the 1868 General Assembly where he was a representative for the 4th district.

In 1873 he was justice of the peace in Van Buren County.

1885 House of Representatives composite photo of the Twenty-Fifth General Assembly of the State of Arkansas

He and other 1885 House representatives and officers were included in a composite photograph, where according to the captioning he was 57 and had been in Arkansas for 24 years, originally from North Carolina, was a Methodist, his post office was in Copeland, Arkansas, and he was a Republican.
