= Weatherford Independent School District =

School district in Texas

Location
- Weatherford, TX Region 11 USA

District information
- Type: Public
- Grades: Pre-K through 12
- Superintendent: Beau Rees, Ph.D.
- Governing agency: Texas Education Agency
- NCES District ID: 4844800

Students and staff
- Students: 7,840
- Teachers: 521.0
- Staff: 977.3

Other information
- Mascot: Kangaroos
- Website: http://www.weatherfordisd.com/

Weatherford Independent School District is a public school district based in Weatherford, Texas (USA).

In addition to Weatherford, the district serves most of Hudson Oaks as well as portions of Willow Park and Annetta North.

In 2009, the school district was rated "recognized" by the Texas Education Agency.

== Schools ==
=== High schools ===
- Grades 9-12
  - Weatherford High School
    - Weatherford High School Ninth Grade Center

=== Middle schools ===
- Grades 6-8
  - Shirley A. Hall Middle School
  - Joe M. Tison Middle School

=== Elementary schools ===
- Grades K-5
  - Stephen F. Austin Elementary School
  - Raymond E. Curtis Elementary School
  - Bose Ikard Elementary School
  - Mary Martin Elementary School
- Grades PK-5
  - David Crockett Elementary School
  - Juan Seguin Elementary School
  - Bill W. Wright Elementary School

== Students ==
=== Academics ===
STAAR - Percent at Level II Satisfactory Standard or Above (Sum of All Grades Tested)
Subject	Weatherford ISD	Region 11	State of Texas
Reading	75%	76%	73%
Mathematics	76%	78%	76%
Writing	71%	72%	69%
Science	81%	81%	79%
Soc. Studies	85%	80%	77%
All Tests	77%	77%	75%

Students in Weatherford typically perform close to local region and statewide averages on standardized tests. In 2015-2016 State of Texas Assessments of Academic Readiness (STAAR) results, 77% of students in Lake Worth ISD met Level II Satisfactory standards, compared with 77% in Region 11 and 75% in the state of Texas. The average SAT score of the class of 2015 was 1478, and the average ACT score was 21.3.

=== Demographics ===
In the 2015–2016 school year, the school district had a total of 7,840 students, ranging from early childhood education and pre-kindergarten through grade 12. The class of 2015 included 520 graduates; the annual drop-out rate across grades 9-12 was 0.0%.

As of the 2015–2016 school year, the ethnic distribution of the school district was 69.1% White, 24.5% Hispanic, 2.4% African American, 0.6% Asian, 0.5% American Indian, 0.0% Pacific Islander, and 2.9% from two or more races. Economically disadvantaged students made up 41.7% of the student body.
