= Millsap, Texas =

- Town
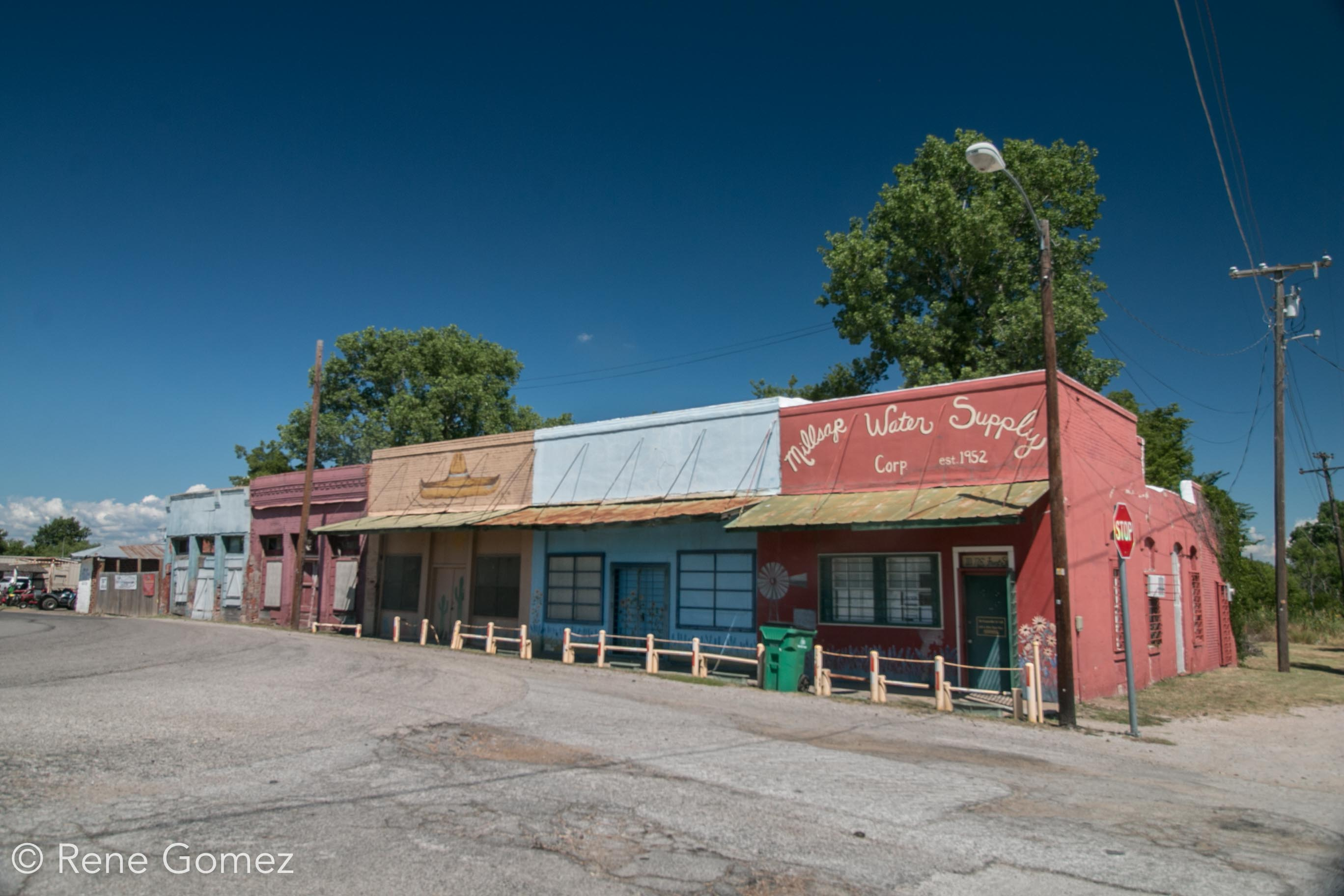
- Millsap Park (demolished in 2019)

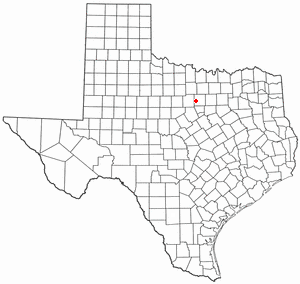
- Location of Millsap, Texas

- Coordinates: 32°44′47″N 98°0′35″W
- Country: United States
- State: Texas
- County: Parker

Area
  - Total: 1.47 sq mi (3.82 km^{2})
  - Land: 1.47 sq mi (3.80 km^{2})
  - Water: 0.0077 sq mi (0.02 km^{2})
- Elevation: 817 ft (249 m)

Population (2020)
  - Total: 370
  - Density: 250/sq mi (97/km^{2})
- Time zone: UTC-6 (Central (CST))
  - Summer (DST): UTC-5 (CDT)
- ZIP code: 76066
- Area code: 940
- FIPS code: 48-48564
- GNIS feature ID: 1341692
- Website: millsaptx.com

Millsap is a town in Parker County, Texas, United States. Its population was 370 at the 2020 census.

== History ==
Originally, Millsap was established as a relay station on the stagecoach route that ran from Weatherford to Palo Pinto. The town was named for Fuller Millsap, who moved to Texas in 1849 and to Parker County in 1856. A Millsap post office opened in 1877.

In 1880, the tracks of the Texas and Pacific Railway arrived. By the 1890s, Millsap was serving area farmers as a retail and shipping point. Within a decade, the town had a bank, more than a dozen other businesses, three churches, a 10-grade educational institution called Millsap College, and a weekly newspaper, the Millsap News. The community population increased from an estimated 100 in 1890 to 800 in 1920.

Following World War II, however, Millsap declined, reaching a low of 261 by 1968. In 1988, 412 residents were reported, and in 1990, an estimated 485 residents lived there. By 2000, the population dropped to 353.

== Geography ==
Millsap is located on Farm to Market Road 113, 15 miles west of Weatherford, in western Parker County. According to the United States Census Bureau, the town has a total area of 1.3 square miles (3.4 km^{2}), of which 99.24% is land and 0.76% is covered by water.

The climate in this area is characterized by relatively high temperatures and evenly distributed precipitation throughout the year. The Köppen climate classification describes the weather as humid subtropical, Cfa.

Climate data for Millsap, Texas
| Month | Jan | Feb | Mar | Apr | May | Jun | Jul | Aug | Sep | Oct | Nov | Dec | Year |
|---|---|---|---|---|---|---|---|---|---|---|---|---|---|
| Mean daily maximum °C (°F) | 14 (57) | 17 (62) | 21 (69) | 26 (78) | 29 (85) | 33 (92) | 36 (97) | 36 (96) | 32 (89) | 26 (79) | 20 (68) | 15 (59) | 26 (78) |
| Mean daily minimum °C (°F) | 0 (32) | 3 (37) | 7 (44) | 12 (53) | 17 (62) | 21 (69) | 22 (72) | 22 (72) | 18 (65) | 12 (54) | 6 (43) | 2 (35) | 12 (53) |
| Average precipitation mm (inches) | 43 (1.7) | 48 (1.9) | 64 (2.5) | 79 (3.1) | 100 (4.1) | 81 (3.2) | 61 (2.4) | 53 (2.1) | 74 (2.9) | 79 (3.1) | 48 (1.9) | 38 (1.5) | 770 (30.4) |
Source: Weatherbase

== Demographics ==
Historical population
| Census | Pop. | Note | %± |
|---|---|---|---|
| 1980 | 439 | | — |
| 1990 | 485 | | 10.5% |
| 2000 | 353 | | −27.2% |
| 2010 | 403 | | 14.2% |
| 2020 | 370 | | −8.2% |
U.S. Decennial Census; 2020 Census

As of the 2000 census, 353 people, 135 households, and 103 families resided in the town. The population density was 268.5 inhabitants per square mile (103.7/km^{2}). The 154 housing units had an average density of 117.1 per square mile (45.2/km^{2}). The racial makeup of the town was 90.93% White, 0.28% Asian, 7.65% from other races, and 1.13% from two or more races. Hispanics or Latinos of any race were 13.03% of the population.

Of the 135 households, 37.0% had children under 18 living with them, 61.5% were married couples living together, 12.6% had a female householder with no husband present, and 23.7% were not families. About 20.7% of all households were made up of individuals, and 10.4% had someone living alone who was 65 or older. The average household size was 2.61, and the average family size was 3.01.

In the town, the age distribution was 28.9% under 18, 6.5% from 18 to 24, 26.3% from 25 to 44, 27.5% from 45 to 64, and 10.8% who were 65 or older. The median age was 38 years. For every 100 females, there were 100.6 males. For every 100 females age 18 and over, there were 94.6 males.

The median income in the town for a household was $40,694 and for a family was $43,229. Males had a median income of $30,714 versus $19,821 for females. The per capita income for the town was $15,699. About 4.4% of families and 6.6% of the population were below the poverty line, including 5.1% of those under 18 and 13.8% of those 65 or over.

== Education ==
Millsap is served by the Millsap Independent School District.
