= Annetta, Texas =

- Town
- Interactive map of Annetta, Texas
- Coordinates: 32°41′38″N 97°39′29″W
- Country: United States
- State: Texas
- County: Parker

Area
  - Total: 3.81 sq mi (9.88 km^{2})
  - Land: 3.75 sq mi (9.72 km^{2})
  - Water: 0.058 sq mi (0.15 km^{2})
- Elevation: 925 ft (282 m)

Population (2020)
  - Total: 3,041
  - Density: 810/sq mi (313/km^{2})
- Time zone: UTC-6 (Central (CST))
  - Summer (DST): UTC-5 (CDT)
- ZIP code: 76008
- Area codes: 682 and 817
- FIPS code: 48-03336
- GNIS feature ID: 2412364
- Website: www.annettatx.gov

Annetta is a town in Parker County, Texas, United States. The population was 3,041 in 2020.

The town is named after the daughter of the founder of the town, a Mr. Fraser who built a station and general store in the area in the mid-1870s.

== Geography ==
According to the United States Census Bureau, the town has a total area of 3.81 square miles (9.9 km^{2}), of which 3.75 square miles (9.7 km^{2}) is land and 0.06 square miles (0.16 km^{2}) (2.25%) is water.

== Demographics ==
Historical population
Census	Pop.	Note	%±
1980	205		—
1990	672		227.8%
2000	1,108		64.9%
2010	1,288		16.2%
2020	3,041		136.1%
2023 (est.)	3,385	▲	11.3%
U.S. Decennial Census

=== 2020 census ===
As of the 2020 census, Annetta had a population of 3,041. The median age was 39.3 years. 30.2% of residents were under the age of 18 and 11.4% of residents were 65 years of age or older. For every 100 females there were 101.7 males, and for every 100 females age 18 and over there were 97.5 males age 18 and over.

0.0% of residents lived in urban areas, while 100.0% lived in rural areas.

There were 949 households in Annetta, of which 50.9% had children under the age of 18 living in them. Of all households, 83.0% were married-couple households, 5.8% were households with a male householder and no spouse or partner present, and 9.8% were households with a female householder and no spouse or partner present. About 8.1% of all households were made up of individuals and 3.9% had someone living alone who was 65 years of age or older.

There were 980 housing units, of which 3.2% were vacant. The homeowner vacancy rate was 0.9% and the rental vacancy rate was 9.3%.

Annetta racial composition as of 2020 (NH = Non-Hispanic) (Note: Note: the US Census treats Hispanic/Latino as an ethnic category. This table excludes Latinos from the racial categories and assigns them to a separate category. Hispanics/Latinos can be of any race.)
Race	Number	Percentage
White (NH)	2,638	86.75%
Black or African American (NH)	15	0.49%
Native American or Alaska Native (NH)	15	0.49%
Asian (NH)	20	0.66%
Pacific Islander (NH)	2	0.07%
Some Other Race (NH)	10	0.33%
Mixed/Multi-Racial (NH)	125	4.11%
Hispanic or Latino	216	7.1%
Total	3,041	

== Education ==
=== Public schools ===
The Town of Annetta is served by the Aledo Independent School District.

== Notable resident ==
- Homa J. Porter politician, born in Annetta
