= Willow Park, Texas =

- City
- Logo

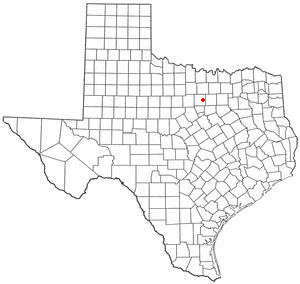
- Location of Willow Park, Texas

- Coordinates: 32°44′35″N 97°38′40″W
- Country: United States
- State: Texas
- County: Parker

Area
  - Total: 6.53 sq mi (16.91 km^{2})
  - Land: 6.43 sq mi (16.66 km^{2})
  - Water: 0.097 sq mi (0.25 km^{2})
- Elevation: 932 ft (284 m)

Population (2020)
  - Total: 4,936
  - Density: 767.4/sq mi (296.3/km^{2})
- Time zone: UTC-6 (Central (CST))
  - Summer (DST): UTC-5 (CDT)
- ZIP code: 76087
- Area code: 817
- FIPS code: 48-79492
- GNIS feature ID: 2412271
- Website: City of Willow Park

Willow Park is a city in Parker County, Texas, United States. The population was 4,936 in 2020.

Willow Park was the location of Trinity Meadows Race Track, one of the first horse racing tracks opened once Texas legalized parimutuel betting. However, it was never seriously considered for upgrade to first-class status. Lone Star Park opened after Trinity Meadows Race Track closed due to a federal lawsuit and violations of the federal Clean Water Act. It is home to Squaw Creek golf course, located just off Ranch House Road.

KTVT, Channel 11 in Fort Worth operates a 1 million watt doppler radar in Willow Park.

== Geography ==
According to the United States Census Bureau, the city has a total area of 6.3 square miles (16 km^{2}), of which 6.2 square miles (16 km^{2}) is land and 0.1 square miles (0.26 km^{2}) (1.60%) is water. The population of Willow Park's corporate limits is 5,100.

== Demographics ==
Historical population
Census	Pop.	Note	%±
1970	230		—
1980	1,152		400.9%
1990	2,328		102.1%
2000	2,849		22.4%
2010	3,982		39.8%
2020	4,936		24.0%
2023 (est.)	6,630		34.3%
U.S. Decennial Census

=== 2020 census ===
As of the 2020 census, there were 4,936 people, 1,743 households, and 1,533 families residing in the city. The median age was 41.1 years; 25.3% of residents were under the age of 18 and 18.4% of residents were 65 years of age or older. For every 100 females there were 98.6 males, and for every 100 females age 18 and over there were 94.6 males age 18 and over.

96.9% of residents lived in urban areas, while 3.1% lived in rural areas.

Of the 1,743 households in Willow Park, 39.7% had children under the age of 18 living in them. Of all households, 70.1% were married-couple households, 11.3% were households with a male householder and no spouse or partner present, and 16.1% were households with a female householder and no spouse or partner present. About 15.2% of all households were made up of individuals and 7.6% had someone living alone who was 65 years of age or older.

There were 1,819 housing units, of which 4.2% were vacant. The homeowner vacancy rate was 2.4% and the rental vacancy rate was 7.7%.

Racial composition as of the 2020 census
Race	Number	Percent
White	4,292	87.0%
Black or African American	45	0.9%
American Indian and Alaska Native	51	1.0%
Asian	46	0.9%
Native Hawaiian and Other Pacific Islander	2	0.0%
Some other race	108	2.2%
Two or more races	392	7.9%
Hispanic or Latino (of any race)	438	8.9%

== Education ==
Willow Park is served by the Aledo and Weatherford Independent School Districts. Trinity Christian Academy has been located in Willow Park since 1993 and serves students pre K through 12th Grade.

== Notable people ==
• Kaden Honeycutt (born 2003), 2026 NASCAR Craftsman Truck Series Champion with Tricon Garage
