= Brock, Texas =

Brock
- incorporated town
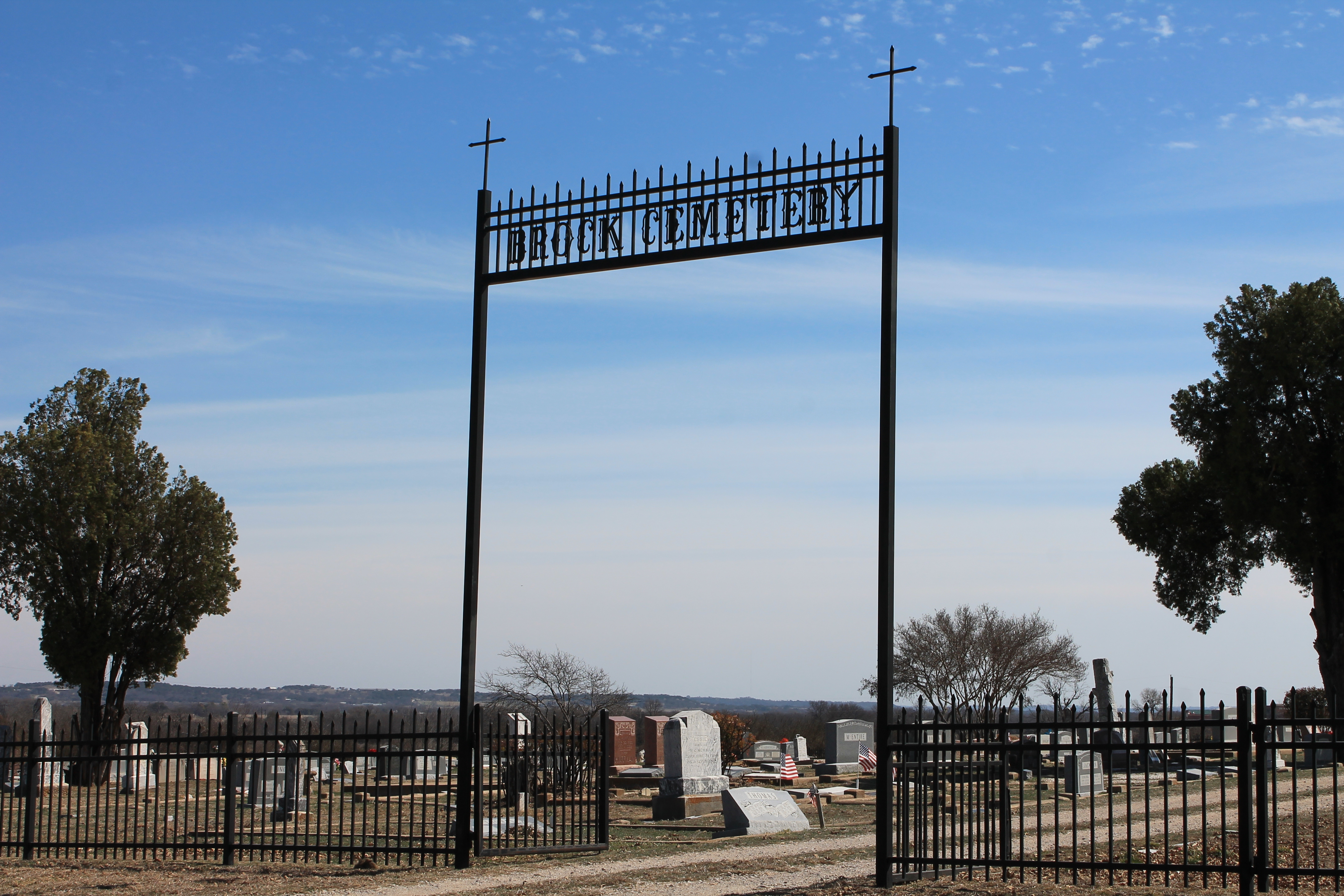

- Logo

- Location within the state of Texas Brock (the United States)
- Coordinates: 32°40′34″N 97°56′27″W
- Country: United States
- State: Texas
- County: Parker
- Elevation: 869 ft (265 m)
- Time zone: UTC-6 (Central (CST))
  - Summer (DST): UTC-5 (CDT)
- Area codes: 682, 817
- GNIS feature ID: 1378050
- Website: www.townofbrocktx.gov

Brock is an incorporated town in Parker County, Texas, United States.

== History ==
James Monroe Maddux (born February 16, 1818) and Sarah Naomi (born June 24, 1824) were married in Georgia and had 12 children. The family moved to Arkansas and then to Olive Branch, (now Brock) Texas in 1876. The Maddux family was very religious and saw at once the need for a church and a school in the Brock community (originally named Olive Branch). On February 7, 1880, land for the churches, cemetery, and school in Brock were given to the community by James M. and Sarah N. Maddux.

John Henry Brock, another early settler, purchased land in the surrounding area in 1876. His wife, Polly, ran the post office. Since there were many communities that surrounded Olive Branch, mail was brought to Mrs. Brock to determine where to deliver them. Hence, mail would come to "Brock" for short. The name Olive Branch was later changed to Brock, in honor of Mrs. Polly Brock, postmistress. By 1892, the community had multiple businesses, a post office, and a school. In November 2016, local voters approved a proposition to incorporate Brock. At the same time, the nearby city of Weatherford investigated the process of involuntarily annexing land in or near the Brock area.

== Education ==
The Brock Independent School District serves area students. On March 2, 2002, Brock won its first state championship in any sport when the Brock Lady Eagles basketball team won the UIL Class A State Championship. The next week, the Brock Eagle basketball team won, as well. The next year, 2003, after moving up to Class AA, both girls and boys teams captured the state championship again, going back to back, a feat that had not been done since 1956 when Buna went back to back, as well. Since then, the Brock Lady Eagles have won basketball State Championships eight times and the boys, three times. The Lady Eagles won state titles in 2002, 2003, 2005, 2009, 2010, 2011, 2012, 2013. The boys won their state titles in 2002, 2003 and 2015. Brock has since won state championships in every sport: baseball, volleyball, golf, tennis, and track, and football in 2015, after only three years since adding this sport to Brock's athletics. Brock has won the UIL Lone Star Cup six times, an award that exemplifies the best school in the state in academics and athletics, per classification.
