= Parker County, Texas =

County in Texas, United States

- County
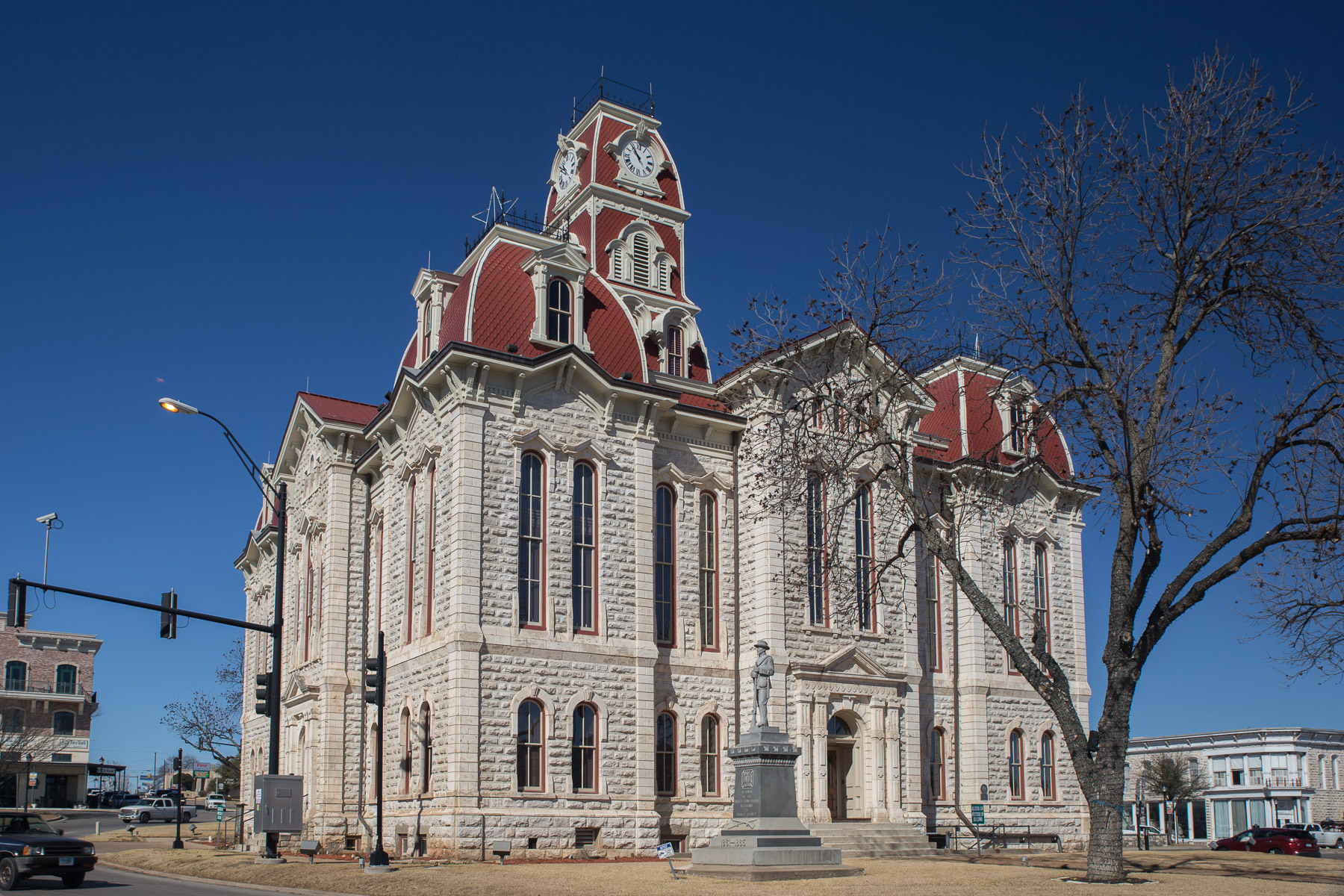
- The Parker County courthouse in Weatherford

- Location within the U.S. state of Texas
- Coordinates: 32°47′N 97°49′W
- Country: United States
- State: Texas
- Founded: 1856
- Named for: Isaac Parker, Texas legislator
- Seat: Weatherford
- Largest city: Weatherford

Area
  - Total: 910 sq mi (2,400 km^{2})
  - Land: 903 sq mi (2,340 km^{2})
  - Water: 6.6 sq mi (17 km^{2}) 0.7%

Population (2020)
  - Total: 148,222
  - Estimate (2025): 184,767 ▲
  - Density: 160/sq mi (62/km^{2})
- Time zone: UTC−6 (Central)
  - Summer (DST): UTC−5 (CDT)
- Congressional districts: 12th, 25th
- Website: www.parkercountytx.gov

Parker County is a county located in the U.S. state of Texas. As of the 2020 census, its population was 148,222. The county seat is Weatherford. The county was created in 1855 and organized the following year. It is named for Isaac Parker, a state legislator who introduced the bill that established the county in 1855. Parker later fought in the Texas Brigade.

Parker County is included in the Dallas-Fort Worth-Arlington metropolitan statistical area.

== Geography ==
According to the U.S. Census Bureau, the county has a total area of 910 square miles (2,400 km^{2}), of which 903 square miles (2,340 km^{2}) are land and 6.6 square miles (17 km^{2}) (0.7%) are covered by water. The county is intersected by the Brazos River.

=== Highest point ===
Slipdown Mountain and Slipdown Bluff, at a height of 1,368 feet (417 m), are the highest points in Parker County. They are located just east of the Advance community, southwest of Poolville.

=== Major highways ===
- I-20
- I-30
- US 180
- US 377
- FM 5
- FM 51
- FM 52
- FM 113
- SH 171
- SH 199
- Loop 182
- Loop 344
- Spur 312
- FM 920

=== Adjacent counties ===
- Wise County (north)
- Tarrant County (east)
- Johnson County (southeast)
- Hood County (south)
- Palo Pinto County (west)
- Jack County (northwest)

== Communities ==
=== Cities (multiple counties) ===
- Azle (mostly in Tarrant County)
- Cresson (partly in Hood and Johnson counties)
- Fort Worth (mostly in Tarrant County, with small parts in Denton, Johnson, Wise, and Parker counties)
- Mineral Wells (mostly in Palo Pinto County)
- Reno (small part in Tarrant County)

=== Cities ===
- Aledo
- Dennis
- Hudson Oaks
- Weatherford (county seat)
- Willow Park

=== Towns ===
- Annetta
- Annetta North
- Annetta South
- Brock
- Cool
- Millsap
- Sanctuary
- Springtown

=== Census-designated places ===
- Briar (partly in Wise and Tarrant counties)
- Carter
- Garner
- Horseshoe Bend
- Western Lake

=== Unincorporated communities ===
- Goshen
- Poolville
- Whitt
- Peaster

== Demographics ==
Historical population
| Census | Pop. | Note | %± |
|---|---|---|---|
| 1860 | 4,213 | | — |
| 1870 | 4,186 | | −0.6% |
| 1880 | 15,870 | | 279.1% |
| 1890 | 21,682 | | 36.6% |
| 1900 | 25,823 | | 19.1% |
| 1910 | 26,331 | | 2.0% |
| 1920 | 23,382 | | −11.2% |
| 1930 | 18,759 | | −19.8% |
| 1940 | 20,482 | | 9.2% |
| 1950 | 21,528 | | 5.1% |
| 1960 | 22,880 | | 6.3% |
| 1970 | 33,888 | | 48.1% |
| 1980 | 44,609 | | 31.6% |
| 1990 | 64,785 | | 45.2% |
| 2000 | 88,495 | | 36.6% |
| 2010 | 116,927 | | 32.1% |
| 2020 | 148,222 | | 26.8% |
| 2025 (est.) | 184,767 | ▲ | 24.7% |
U.S. Decennial Census; 1850–2010 2010 2020

=== 2020 census ===
As of the 2020 census, the county had a population of 148,222, up from 88,495 in 2000. The median age was 39.8 years. 24.8% of residents were under the age of 18 and 16.4% of residents were 65 years of age or older. For every 100 females there were 98.4 males, and for every 100 females age 18 and over there were 96.0 males age 18 and over.

The racial makeup of the county was 83.0% White, 1.2% Black or African American, 0.8% American Indian and Alaska Native, 0.7% Asian, 0.1% Native Hawaiian and Pacific Islander, 4.6% from some other race, and 9.7% from two or more races. Hispanic or Latino residents of any race comprised 13.4% of the population.

35.7% of residents lived in urban areas, while 64.3% lived in rural areas.

There were 53,482 households in the county, of which 35.7% had children under the age of 18 living in them. Of all households, 61.5% were married-couple households, 14.2% were households with a male householder and no spouse or partner present, and 19.4% were households with a female householder and no spouse or partner present. About 19.8% of all households were made up of individuals and 8.9% had someone living alone who was 65 years of age or older.

There were 57,427 housing units, of which 6.9% were vacant. Among occupied housing units, 79.3% were owner-occupied and 20.7% were renter-occupied. The homeowner vacancy rate was 1.6% and the rental vacancy rate was 7.1%.

=== Racial and ethnic composition ===
Parker County, Texas – Racial and ethnic composition Note: the US Census treats Hispanic/Latino as an ethnic category. This table excludes Latinos from the racial categories and assigns them to a separate category. Hispanics/Latinos may be of any race.
| Race / Ethnicity (NH = Non-Hispanic) | Pop 1980 | Pop 1990 | Pop 2000 | Pop 2010 | Pop 2020 | % 1980 | % 1990 | % 2000 | % 2010 | % 2020 |
|---|---|---|---|---|---|---|---|---|---|---|
| White alone (NH) | 42,526 | 60,950 | 78,980 | 99,698 | 117,747 | 95.33% | 94.08% | 89.25% | 85.27% | 79.44% |
| Black or African American alone (NH) | 390 | 570 | 1,559 | 1,842 | 1,636 | 0.87% | 0.88% | 1.76% | 1.58% | 1.10% |
| Native American or Alaska Native alone (NH) | 154 | 337 | 518 | 768 | 878 | 0.35% | 0.52% | 0.59% | 0.66% | 0.59% |
| Asian alone (NH) | 113 | 219 | 298 | 631 | 990 | 0.25% | 0.34% | 0.34% | 0.54% | 0.67% |
| Native Hawaiian or Pacific Islander alone (NH) | x | x | 19 | 35 | 97 | x | x | 0.02% | 0.03% | 0.07% |
| Other race alone (NH) | 71 | 12 | 58 | 64 | 470 | 0.16% | 0.02% | 0.07% | 0.05% | 0.32% |
| Mixed race or Multiracial (NH) | x | x | 852 | 1,479 | 6,585 | x | x | 0.96% | 1.26% | 4.44% |
| Hispanic or Latino (any race) | 1,355 | 2,697 | 6,211 | 12,410 | 19,819 | 3.04% | 4.16% | 7.02% | 10.61% | 13.37% |
| Total | 44,609 | 64,785 | 88,495 | 116,927 | 148,222 | 100.00% | 100.00% | 100.00% | 100.00% | 100.00% |

== Politics ==
Parker County, like most suburban counties in the Dallas–Fort Worth metropolitan area, has been a Republican stronghold for decades. Republicans have held all public offices since 1999 and the county has not voted for a Democratic presidential candidate since 1976.

Parker County is located within District 60 of the Texas House of Representatives. Parker County contains parts of within District 10 and parts of District 30 for representation in the Texas Senate.

United States presidential election results for Parker County, Texas
| Year | Republican | | Democratic | | Third party(ies) | |
| Year | No. | % | No. | % | No. | % |
|---|---|---|---|---|---|---|
| 1912 | 135 | 5.62% | 1,700 | 70.72% | 569 | 23.67% |
| 1916 | 173 | 7.77% | 1,797 | 80.69% | 257 | 11.54% |
| 1920 | 488 | 20.60% | 1,765 | 74.50% | 116 | 4.90% |
| 1924 | 438 | 14.70% | 2,391 | 80.26% | 150 | 5.04% |
| 1928 | 2,178 | 66.24% | 1,110 | 33.76% | 0 | 0.00% |
| 1932 | 372 | 10.68% | 3,074 | 88.28% | 36 | 1.03% |
| 1936 | 375 | 12.95% | 2,493 | 86.08% | 28 | 0.97% |
| 1940 | 558 | 13.12% | 3,687 | 86.69% | 8 | 0.19% |
| 1944 | 559 | 12.27% | 3,503 | 76.90% | 493 | 10.82% |
| 1948 | 806 | 19.75% | 3,061 | 75.02% | 213 | 5.22% |
| 1952 | 3,523 | 50.50% | 3,434 | 49.23% | 19 | 0.27% |
| 1956 | 3,390 | 51.46% | 3,165 | 48.04% | 33 | 0.50% |
| 1960 | 3,467 | 48.50% | 3,629 | 50.77% | 52 | 0.73% |
| 1964 | 2,175 | 29.16% | 5,270 | 70.66% | 13 | 0.17% |
| 1968 | 3,068 | 32.98% | 4,301 | 46.23% | 1,934 | 20.79% |
| 1972 | 7,152 | 69.11% | 3,184 | 30.77% | 13 | 0.13% |
| 1976 | 4,692 | 36.18% | 8,186 | 63.12% | 91 | 0.70% |
| 1980 | 8,505 | 52.65% | 7,336 | 45.41% | 314 | 1.94% |
| 1984 | 13,647 | 69.07% | 6,050 | 30.62% | 62 | 0.31% |
| 1988 | 14,090 | 62.01% | 8,517 | 37.48% | 116 | 0.51% |
| 1992 | 10,321 | 37.54% | 7,934 | 28.86% | 9,239 | 33.60% |
| 1996 | 14,580 | 54.29% | 9,447 | 35.18% | 2,828 | 10.53% |
| 2000 | 23,651 | 71.18% | 8,878 | 26.72% | 696 | 2.09% |
| 2004 | 31,795 | 77.63% | 8,966 | 21.89% | 196 | 0.48% |
| 2008 | 36,974 | 77.11% | 10,502 | 21.90% | 475 | 0.99% |
| 2012 | 39,243 | 82.28% | 7,853 | 16.47% | 598 | 1.25% |
| 2016 | 46,473 | 81.79% | 8,344 | 14.69% | 2,000 | 3.52% |
| 2020 | 62,045 | 81.50% | 13,017 | 17.10% | 1,066 | 1.40% |
| 2024 | 75,168 | 82.75% | 14,872 | 16.37% | 800 | 0.88% |

United States Senate election results for Parker County, Texas1
| Year | Republican | | Democratic | | Third party(ies) | |
| Year | No. | % | No. | % | No. | % |
|---|---|---|---|---|---|---|
| 2024 | 72,477 | 79.89% | 16,349 | 18.02% | 1,900 | 2.09% |

United States Senate election results for Parker County, Texas2
| Year | Republican | | Democratic | | Third party(ies) | |
| Year | No. | % | No. | % | No. | % |
|---|---|---|---|---|---|---|
| 2020 | 61,705 | 83.28% | 11,919 | 16.09% | 473 | 0.64% |
| 2026 | 56,548 | 74.23% | 17,812 | 23.38% | 1,824 | 2.39% |

Texas Gubernatorial election results for Parker County
| Year | Republican | | Democratic | | Third party(ies) | |
| Year | No. | % | No. | % | No. | % |
|---|---|---|---|---|---|---|
| 2022 | 52,523 | 82.80% | 10,123 | 15.96% | 791 | 1.25% |
| 2026 | 58,039 | 76.02% | 16,879 | 22.11% | 1,424 | 1.87% |

== Notable people ==
- Oliver Loving, developer of the Loving-Goodnight Cattle Trail
- Bose Ikard, trusted cattle driver of Oliver Loving and Charles Goodnight
- Mary Martin, star of stage and screen
- S.W.T. Lanham, last Confederate veteran to serve as governor of Texas
- Jim Wright, youngest mayor of Weatherford, Texas, and Speaker of the U.S. House of Representatives

== See also ==
- List of museums in North Texas
- National Register of Historic Places listings in Parker County, Texas
- Recorded Texas Historic Landmarks in Parker County
