= North Texas =

Geographic region of the U.S. state of Texas

- Region
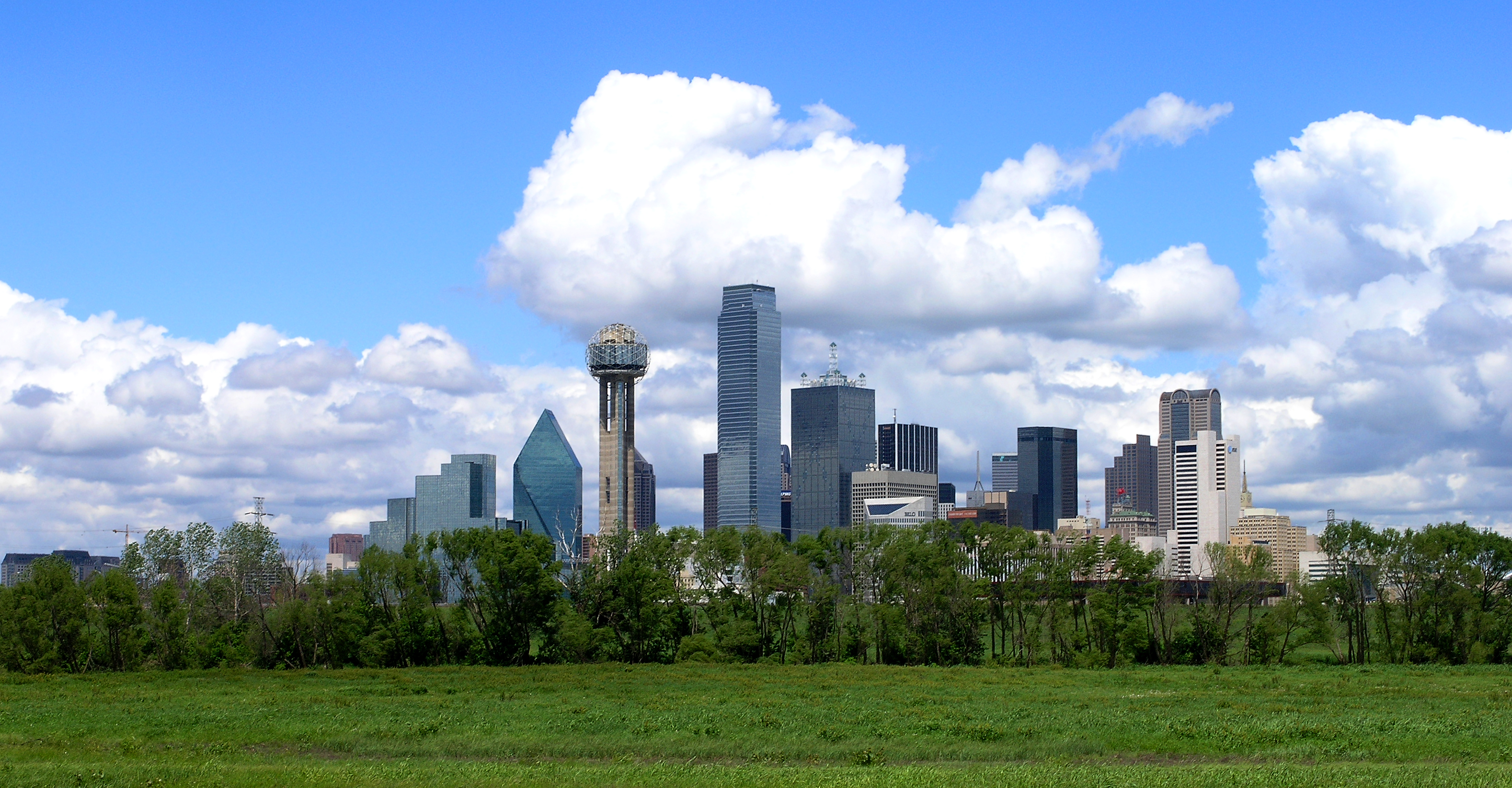
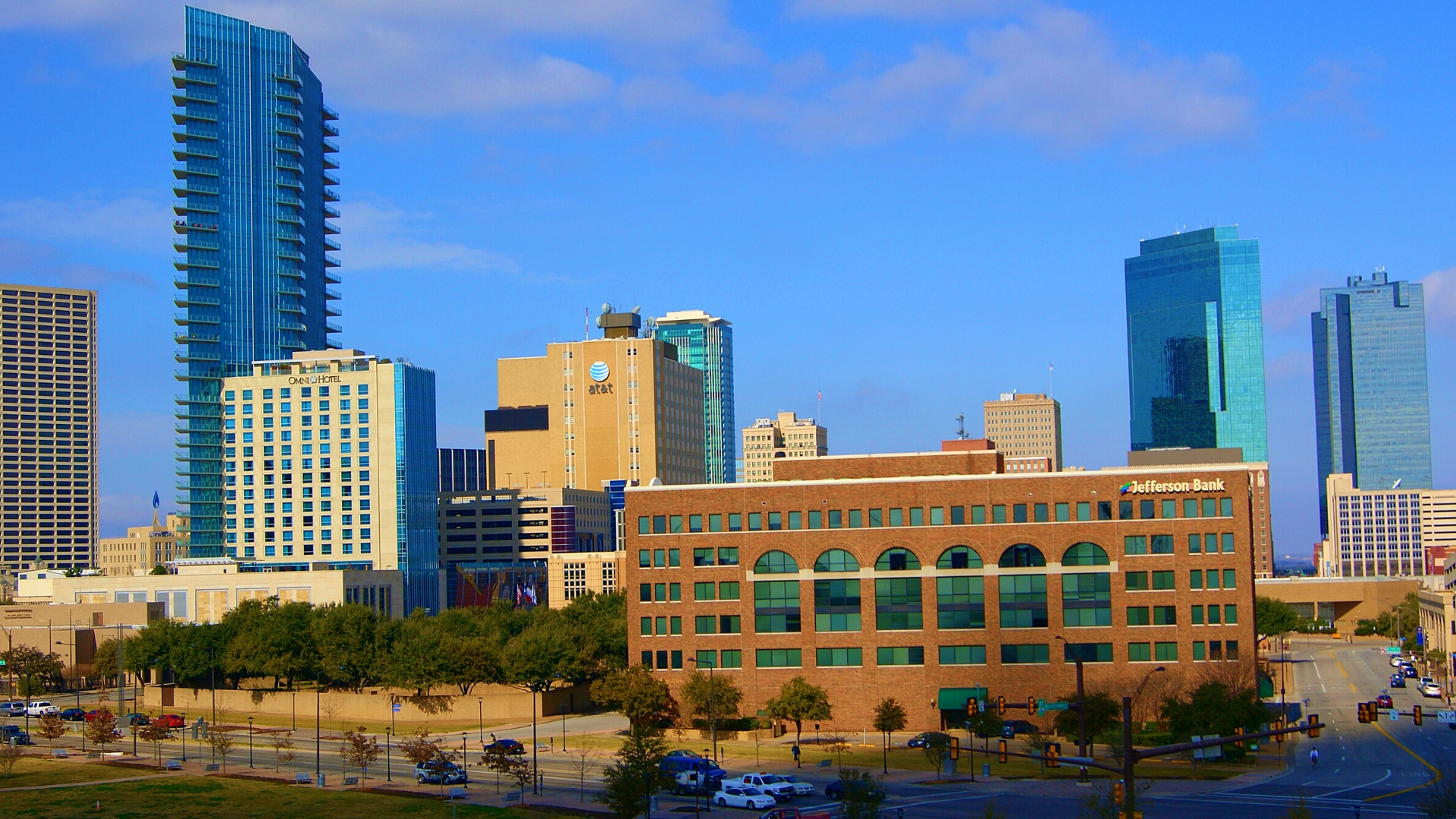
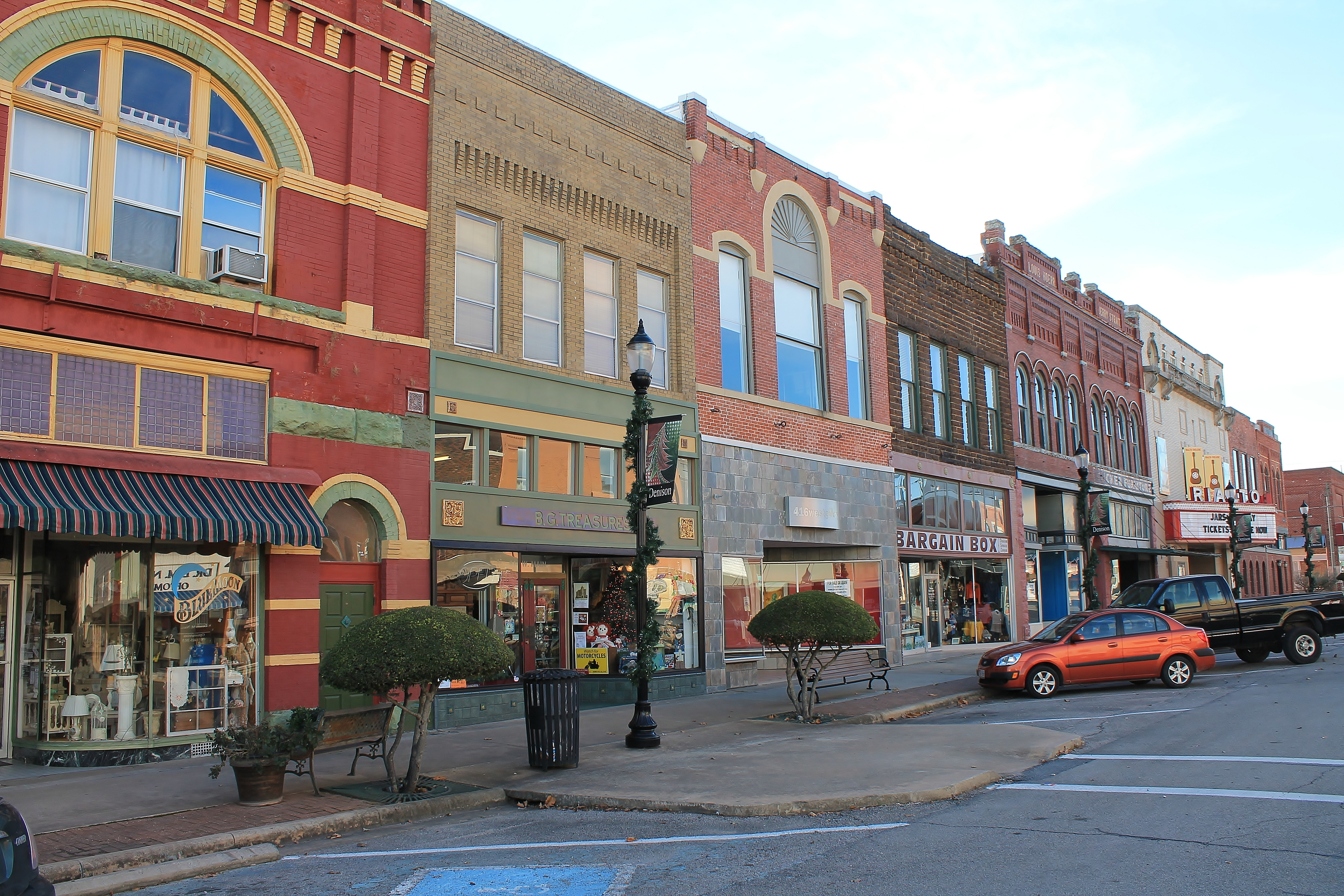
- From top, left to right: Downtown Dallas, Downtown Fort Worth, Denison Commercial Historic District

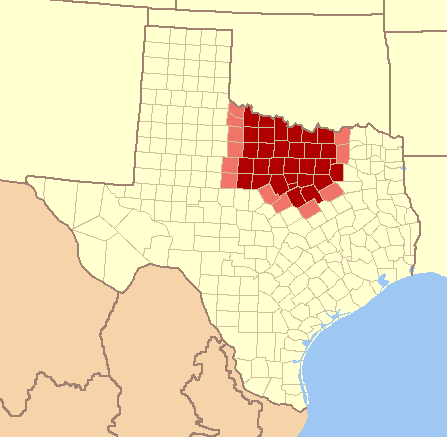
- North Texas counties in red
- Country: United States
- State: Texas
- Largest city: Dallas

Population (2020)
  - Total: 8,584,519

North Texas is a term used primarily by residents of the Dallas–Fort Worth metroplex to refer to a geographic area of Texas, generally considered to include the area south of Oklahoma, east of Abilene, west of Paris, and north of Waco. Definitions of the region typically do not include the sparsely populated Panhandle of Texas, which is the northernmost region of Texas bordered by New Mexico to the west and Oklahoma to the north and east.

North Texas is centered upon the Dallas–Fort Worth metroplex, the largest metropolitan area in Texas and the Southern United States. People in the Dallas and Fort Worth areas sometimes use the terms Metroplex, DFW, and North Texas interchangeably. However, North Texas refers to a much larger area that includes many northern rural counties along the Red River of the South border.

== History ==
Indigenous tribes in North Texas included the Caddo, Tawakoni, Wichita, Kickapoo, and Comanche. With European colonization, Mexican independence, and Texan independence and annexation to the United States, many of these tribes experienced demographic decline through relocation, slavery, etc. Since European colonization and the independence movements, the North Texas area was settled and most notably developed the cities of Dallas and Fort Worth.

== Climate ==
The North Texas climate is subtropical with hot summers. It is also continental, characterized by a wide annual temperature range. Average annual precipitation also varies considerably, ranging from less than 28 to more than 48 inches (700–1200 mm). Severe storms are frequent in the spring and summer, as the area lies in the southern section of Tornado Alley.

South is the prevailing wind direction, and southerly winds are frequently high and persist for several days. Strong northerly winds often occur during the passage of cold fronts.

Winters can be mild, but northers occur about three times each month, and often are accompanied by sudden drops in temperature. In Dallas, a record-setting 12.8 inches of snow fell in February 2010. Periods of extreme cold that occasionally occur are short-lived, so that even in January mild weather occurs frequently.

The highest temperatures of summer are associated with fair skies, and moderate to high humidities. Characteristically, hot spells in summer are broken into three- to five-day periods by thunderstorm activity. There are only a few nights each summer when the low temperature exceeds 80 °F (27 °C). Summer daytime temperatures frequently exceed 100 °F (38 °C). Air conditioners are recommended for maximum comfort indoors and while traveling via automobile.

Throughout the year, rainfall occurs more frequently during the night. Usually, periods of rainy weather last for only a day or two, and are followed by several days with fair skies. A large part of the annual precipitation results from thunderstorm activity, with occasional heavy rainfall over brief periods of time. Thunderstorms occur throughout the year, but are most frequent in the spring and early summer months. Hail falls on about two or three days a year, ordinarily with only slight and scattered damage. Windstorms occurring during thunderstorm activity are sometimes destructive. Snowfall is uncommon.

The average length of the warm season (freeze-free period) is about 249 days. The average last occurrence of 32 °F (0 °C) or below is mid March and the average first occurrence of 32 °F or below is in late November.

== Counties ==
Although the terms "Northeastern Texas" or "North Texas" are not official state designations, the Texas State Data Center and Office of the State Demographer lists the following counties as belonging to the North Central Texas Council of Governments (NCTCOG):

- Collin
- Dallas
- Denton
- Ellis
- Erath
- Hood
- Hunt
- Johnson
- Kaufman
- Navarro
- Palo Pinto
- Parker
- Rockwall
- Somervell
- Tarrant
- Wise

The Texas State Demographer also lists the following regional county groupings, some or all of which are often included in the informal meaning of the terms "North Texas" or "North Central Texas".

Nortex Regional Planning Commission:

- Archer
- Baylor
- Clay
- Cottle
- Foard
- Hardeman
- Jack
- Montague
- Wichita
- Wilbarger
- Young

Texoma Council of Governments:

- Cooke
- Fannin
- Grayson

Additionally, some other Texas counties contiguous with those named above are sometimes included in the general meaning of "North Texas".

== Major cities ==
City	Population (2023)	State rank	U.S. rank
Dallas	1,259,404	3	9
Fort Worth	1,029,221	4	11
Arlington	405,995	7	49
Plano	291,450	9	69
Garland	235,293	12	91
Irving	248,931	13	93
Grand Prairie	199,395	15	127
McKinney	214,302	17	155
Frisco	227,528	18	162
Mesquite	143,792	20	181
Carrollton	132,935	23	197
Denton	160,564	26	202
Richardson	113,613	32	255
Wichita Falls	103,687	35	285
Lewisville	114,170	36	288
Allen	109,411	40	
Flower Mound	79,102	50	

== Other cities and towns ==
- Addison
- Aledo
- Alma
- Alvarado
- Alvord
- Angus
- Anna
- Annetta
- Annetta North
- Annetta South
- Archer City
- Argyle
- Aubrey
- Aurora
- Azle
- Bailey
- Balch Springs
- Bardwell
- Barry
- Bartonville
- Bedford
- Bellevue
- Bells
- Benbrook
- Blooming Grove
- Blue Mound
- Blue Ridge
- Bonham
- Bowie
- Boyd
- Brazos Bend
- Breckenridge
- Briaroaks
- Bridgeport
- Bryson
- Burkburnett
- Burleson
- Byers
- Caddo Mills
- Callisburg
- Campbell
- Cashion Community
- Cedar Hill
- Celeste
- Celina
- Chico
- Chillicothe
- Cleburne
- Cockrell Hill
- Colleyville
- Collinsville
- Commerce
- Cool
- Copper Canyon
- Combine
- Coppell
- Corinth
- Corral City
- Corsicana
- Cottonwood
- Coyote Flats
- Crandall
- Cresson
- Cross Roads
- Cross Timber
- Crowell
- Crowley
- Dalworthington Gardens
- Dawson
- Decatur
- Dean
- DeCordova
- Denison
- DeSoto
- Dish
- Dodd City
- Dorchester
- Double Oak
- Dublin
- Duncanville
- Eagle Mountain
- Ector
- Edgecliff Village
- Elizabethtown
- Emhouse
- Ennis
- Euless
- Eureka
- Everman
- Fairview
- Farmers Branch
- Farmersville
- Fate
- Ferris
- Forest Hill
- Forney
- Frost
- Gainesville
- Garrett
- Glen Rose
- Glenn Heights
- Godley
- Goodlow
- Gordon
- Graford
- Graham
- Granbury
- Grandview
- Grapevine
- Greenville
- Gunter
- Hackberry
- Haltom City
- Haslet
- Hawk Cove
- Heath
- Hebron
- Henrietta
- Hickory Creek
- Highland Park
- Highland Village
- Holliday
- Honey Grove
- Howe
- Hudson Oaks
- Hurst
- Hutchins
- Iowa Park
- Italy
- Jacksboro
- Jolly
- Josephine
- Joshua
- Justin
- Kaufman
- Keene
- Keller
- Kemp
- Kennedale
- Kerens
- Knollwood
- Krugerville
- Ladonia
- Lancaster
- Lake Bridgeport
- Lake Dallas
- Lake Worth
- Lakeside
- Lakeside City
- Lakewood Village
- Lavon
- Leonard
- Lincoln Park
- Lindsay
- Lipan
- Little Elm
- Lone Oak
- Lowry Crossing
- Lucas
- Mabank
- Mansfield
- Maypearl
- Megargel
- McLendon-Chisholm
- Melissa
- Meridian
- Midlothian
- Mildred
- Milford
- Millsap
- Mineral Wells
- Mingus
- Mobile City
- Muenster
- Murphy
- Mustang
- Navarro
- Nevada
- New Fairview
- New Hope
- Newark
- Newcastle
- Neylandville
- Nocona
- Northlake
- North Richland Hills
- Oak Grove
- Oak Leaf
- Oak Point
- Oak Ridge (Cooke County)
- Oak Ridge (Kaufman County)
- Oak Valley
- Olney
- Ovilla
- Paducah
- Palmer
- Pantego
- Paradise
- Parker
- Pecan Hill
- Pelican Bay
- Petrolia
- Pilot Point
- Pleasant Valley
- Ponder
- Post Oak Bend City
- Pottsboro
- Powell
- Princeton
- Prosper
- Providence Village
- Quanah
- Quinlan
- Ravenna
- Red Oak
- Retreat
- Rhome
- Reno
- Rice
- Richland
- Richland Hills
- Rio Vista
- River Oaks
- Roanoke
- Rockwall
- Rowlett
- Royse City
- Runaway Bay
- Sachse
- Sadler
- Saginaw
- Sanctuary
- Sanger
- Sansom Park
- Savoy
- Seagoville
- Scotland
- Scurry
- Seymour
- Shady Shores
- Sherman
- Southlake
- Southmayd
- Springtown
- St. Jo
- St. Paul
- Stephenville
- Strawn
- Sunnyvale
- Talty
- Terrell
- The Colony
- Tioga
- Tolar
- Tom Bean
- Trenton
- Trophy Club
- Union Valley
- University Park
- Valley View
- Van Alstyne
- Venus
- Vernon
- Waxahachie
- Watauga
- Weatherford
- West Tawakoni
- Westlake
- Westover Hills
- Westworth Village
- Whitesboro
- White Settlement
- Whitewright
- Wilmer
- Windom
- Windthorst
- Wolfe City
- Wylie

== Statistical areas ==
In the North Texas region there is one combined statistical area, three metropolitan areas, and seven micropolitan areas.

=== Dallas–Fort Worth TX-OK combined statistical area ===
Metropolitan statistical areas (MSAs)

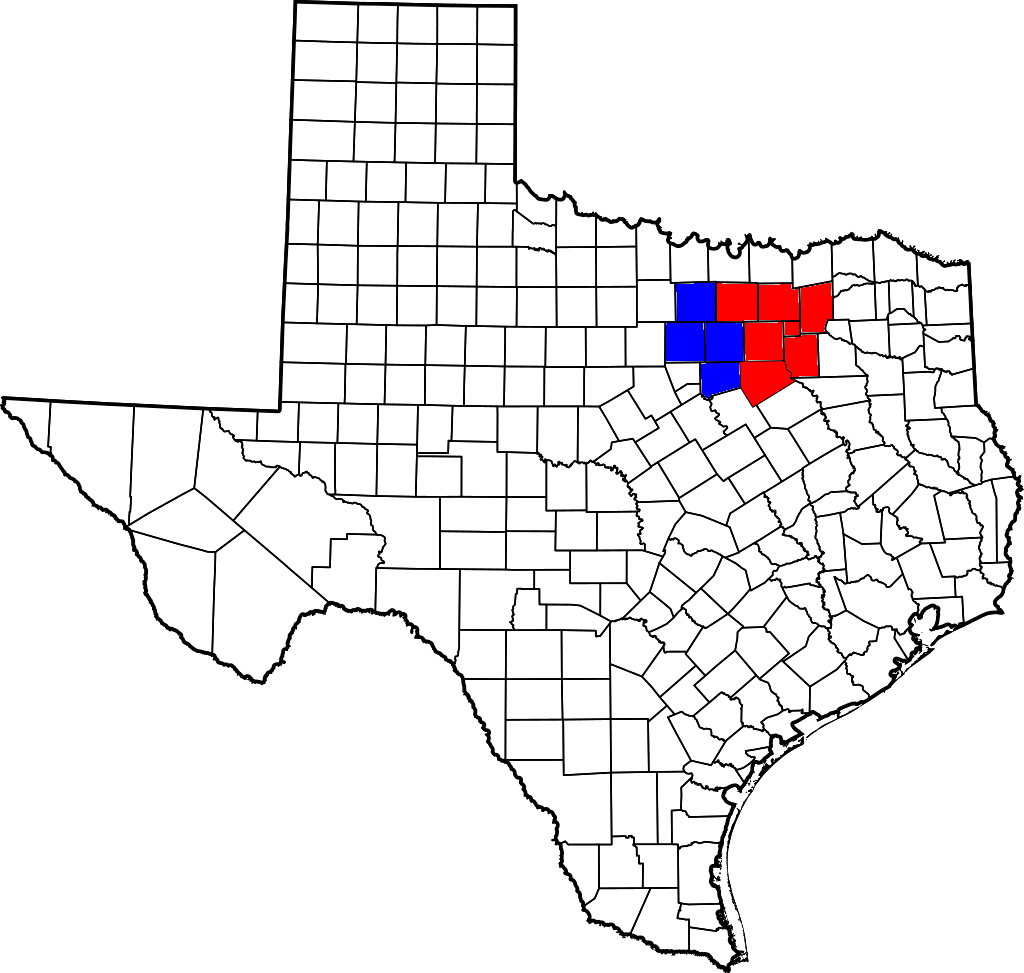
Metropolitan divisions in the Dallas–Fort Worth–Arlington MSA: Dallas–Plano–Irving Fort Worth–Arlington–Grapevine

- Dallas–Fort Worth–Arlington is the only MSA in Texas subdivided into metropolitan divisions:
  - Dallas–Plano–Irving (Collin, Dallas, Denton, Ellis, Hunt, Kaufman, and Rockwall counties)
  - Fort Worth–Arlington–Grapevine (Johnson, Parker, Tarrant, and Wise counties)
- Sherman–Denison (Grayson County)

Micropolitan statistical areas (μSAs)

- Athens (Henderson County) (In East Texas)
- Bonham (Fannin County)
- Corsicana (Navarro County)
- Durant, OK (Bryan County, Oklahoma) (In Oklahoma)
- Gainesville (Cooke County)
- Granbury (Hood County)
- Mineral Wells (Palo Pinto County)

=== Wichita Falls area ===
Metropolitan statistical areas (MSAs)

- Wichita Falls (Archer, Clay, Wichita counties)

Micropolitan statistical areas (μSAs)

- Vernon (Wilbarger County)

=== Other ===
Micropolitan statistical Areas (μSAs)

- Stephenville (Erath County)

== Economy ==
=== Top employers ===
Dallas–Fort Worth metroplex

Company	No. of employees locally	Type of business
Wal-Mart Stores, Inc.	34,000	Retail
American Airlines	27,000	Commercial airline
Texas Health Resources	22,296	Health care
Dallas Independent School District	19,740	Education
Baylor Health Care System	16,500	Health care

Wichita Falls metropolitan area

#	Employer	# of Employees
1	Sheppard Air Force Base	12,272
2	Wichita Falls Independent School District	2,059
3	North Texas State Hospital	1,974
4	United Regional Health Care System	1,778
5	City of Wichita Falls	1,477
6	Midwestern State University	1,284
7	James V. Allred Unit	971
8	Cryovac	732
9	Work Services Corporation	730
10	Howmet Castings	704

Sherman–Denison metropolitan area

#	Employer	# of Employees
1	Tyson Foods	1,400
2	Texoma Health Systems	1,375
3	Texas Instruments	1,200
4	Cigna	1,000
5	Wilson N Jones Health Systems	1,000

== Colleges and universities ==
Public universities
School	Enrollment	Location	Mascot	Athletic affiliation (conference)	University system
East Texas A&M University	10,966	Commerce	Lions	NCAA Division I FCS (Southland)	Texas A&M University System
The University of North Texas	46,940	Denton	Mean Green	NCAA Division I FBS (American)	University of North Texas System
University of Texas at Arlington	40,990	Arlington, Fort Worth	Mavericks	NCAA Division I (WAC); Non–Football	University of Texas System
University of Texas at Dallas	30,885	Richardson	Comets	NCAA Division III (American Southwest); Non–Football	University of Texas System
Texas Woman's University	15,472	Denton	Pioneers	NCAA Division II (Lone Star); Women's sports only	Independent
Tarleton State University	14,092	Stephenville, Fort Worth	Texans	NCAA Division I FCS (WAC)	Texas A&M University System
Midwestern State University	6,102	Wichita Falls	Mustangs	NCAA Division II (Lone Star)	Texas Tech University System
University of North Texas at Dallas	3,513	Dallas	Trailblazers	NAIA (Sooner); Non–Football	University of North Texas System

Private universities
School	Enrollment	Location	Mascot	Athletic affiliation (conference)
Southern Methodist University	11,643	University Park	Mustangs	NCAA Division I FBS (American)
Texas Christian University	10,323	Fort Worth	Horned Frogs	NCAA Division I FBS (Big 12)
Dallas Baptist University	5,445	Dallas	Patriots	NCAA Division II (Lone Star); Non–Football, compete in the Missouri Valley Conference at the Division I level for baseball
Texas Wesleyan University	3,378	Fort Worth	Rams	NAIA (Sooner)
University of Dallas	2,576	Irving	Crusaders	NCAA Division III (SCAC); Non–Football, compete in Texas Rugby Union at the Division II level for Rugby
Southwestern Assemblies of God University	2,012	Waxahachie	Lions	NAIA NCCAA (Sooner)
Austin College	1,224	Sherman	Roos	NCAA Division III (SCAC); Compete in the Southern Athletic Association for football
Paul Quinn College	600	Dallas	Tigers	NAIA (Red River); Non–Football

== Sports ==
The North Texas region has teams from the four major professional sports leagues. Major professional sports first came to the area in 1960, when the Dallas Cowboys began competing in the National Football League and the Dallas Texans began competing in the American Football League. (The Texans later relocated to Kansas City and became the Chiefs). In 1972, Major League Baseball's Washington Senators moved to Arlington to become the Texas Rangers, named after the statewide law enforcement agency. The National Basketball Association expanded into North Texas in 1980 when the Dallas Mavericks were added to the league. The fourth sport was added in 1993 when the Minnesota North Stars of the National Hockey League moved to Dallas, becoming the Dallas Stars.

The Major League Soccer team FC Dallas is based in Frisco, and the Dallas Wings of the WNBA plays in Arlington. The area is also home to many minor league professional teams and four colleges that compete in NCAA Division I athletics.

=== Major professional sports teams ===
Club	Sport	Founded	League	Venue
Dallas Cowboys	Football	1960	NFL	AT&T Stadium
Texas Rangers	Baseball	1972^	MLB	Globe Life Field
Dallas Mavericks	Basketball	1980	NBA	American Airlines Center
Dallas Stars	Hockey	1993^	NHL	American Airlines Center
FC Dallas	Soccer	1996	MLS	Toyota Stadium
Dallas Wings	Basketball	2015^	WNBA	College Park Center

^- Indicates year team relocated to the area

=== Other professional teams ===
Club	Sport	Founded	League	Venue
Allen Americans	Hockey	2009	ECHL	Credit Union of Texas Event Center
Dallas Jackals	Rugby union	2022	Major League Rugby	Choctaw Stadium
Dallas Sidekicks	Indoor soccer	2012	Major Arena Soccer League	Credit Union of Texas Event Center
Frisco Fighters	Indoor football	2021	Indoor Football League	Comerica Center
Frisco RoughRiders	Baseball	2003^	Texas League	Riders Field
Fort Worth Vaqueros FC	Soccer	2014	National Premier Soccer League	W.O. Barnes Stadium
Texas Legends	Basketball	2010^	NBA G League	Comerica Center

^- Indicates year team relocated to the area

=== Division I college teams ===
School	City	Mascot	Conference
University of Texas at Arlington	Arlington	Mavericks	Sun Belt Conference
University of North Texas	Denton	Mean Green	Conference USA
Southern Methodist University	University Park	Mustangs	American Athletic Conference
Texas Christian University	Fort Worth	Horned Frogs	Big 12 Conference
Texas A&M University–Commerce	Commerce	Lions	Southland Conference
Dallas Baptist University	Dallas	Patriots	Missouri Valley Conference (baseball only)

The headquarters for both the Big 12 and Conference USA are located in Irving, and the Southland Conference headquarters are in Frisco.

== Transportation ==
=== Commercial airports ===
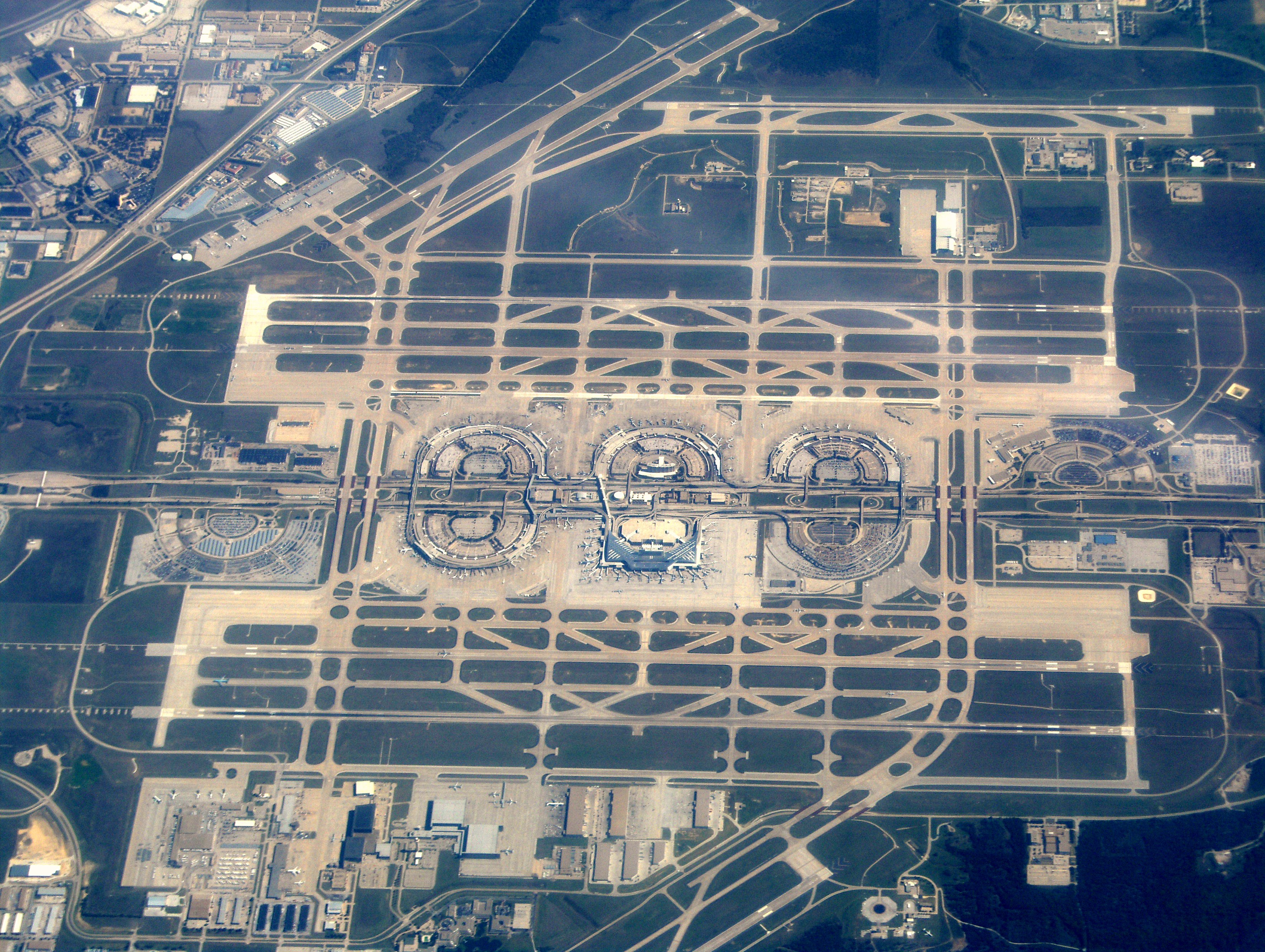
Dallas/Fort Worth International Airport

- Dallas Love Field
- Dallas/Fort Worth International Airport
- Wichita Falls Municipal Airport

=== Public transit ===
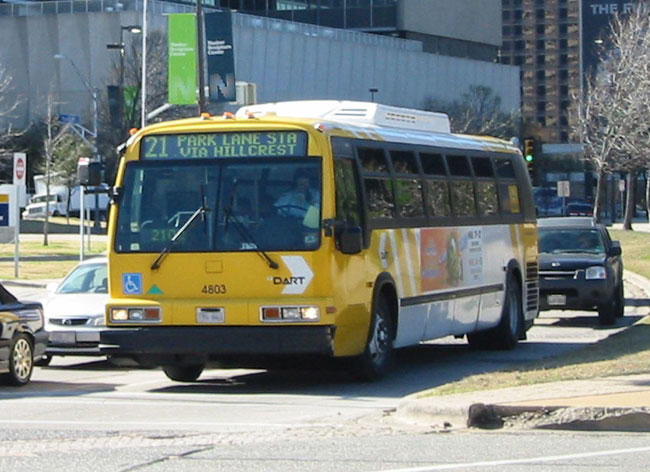
Dallas Area Rapid Transit

- Dallas Area Rapid Transit
- Denton County Transportation Authority
- Falls Ride
- Trinity Metro
- TAPS
- STAR Transit

=== Major highways ===
==== Interstates ====
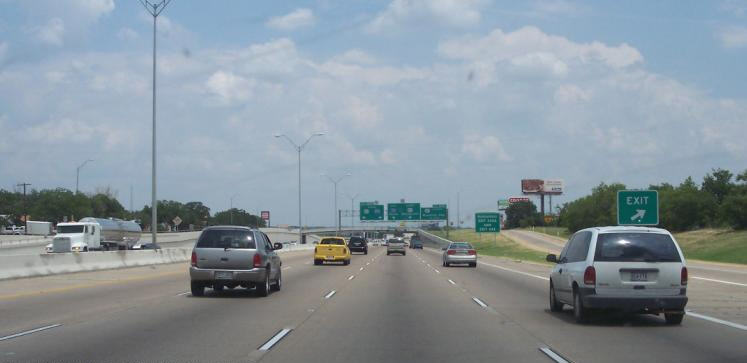
Interstate 20

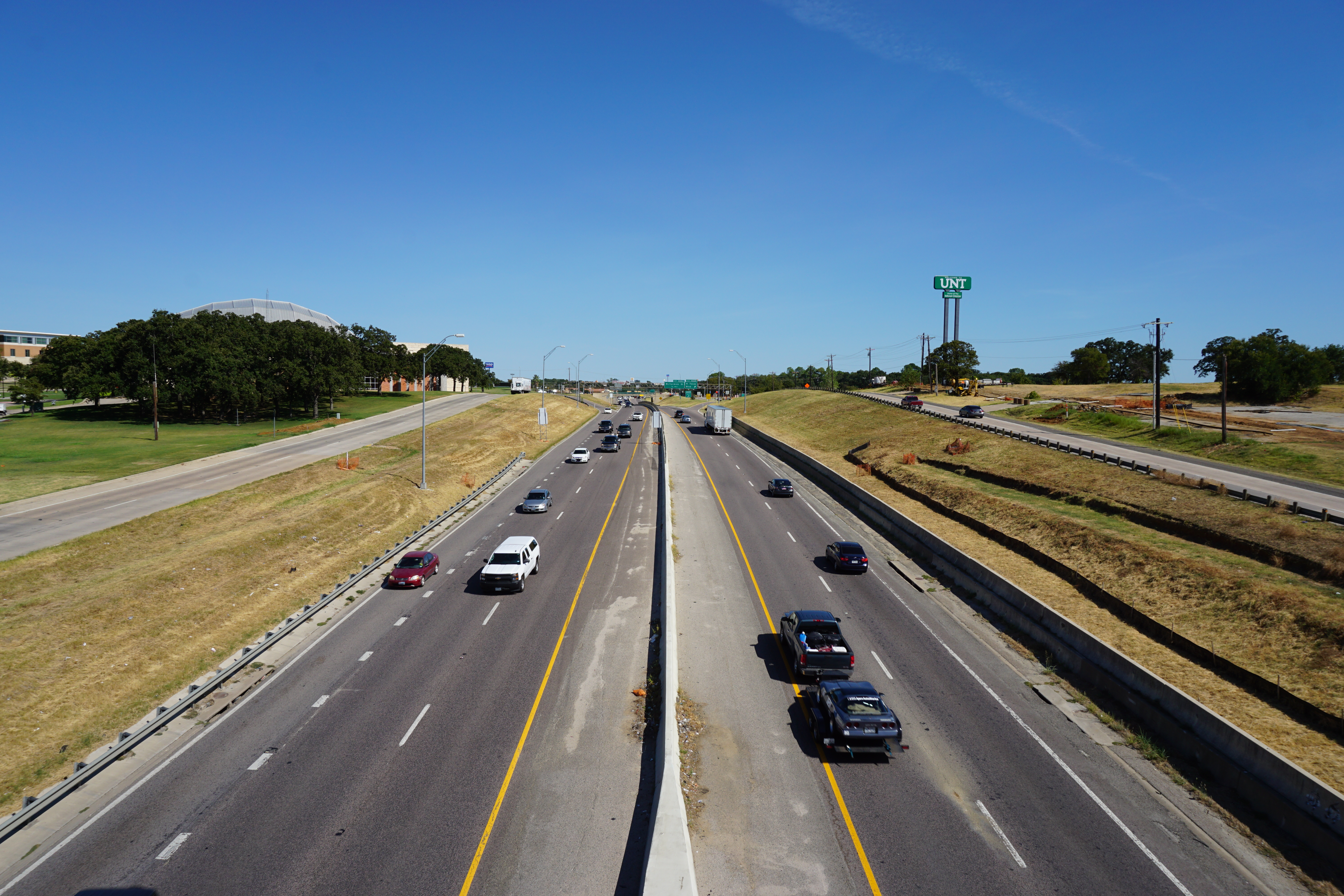
Interstate 35E

==== U.S. Routes ====
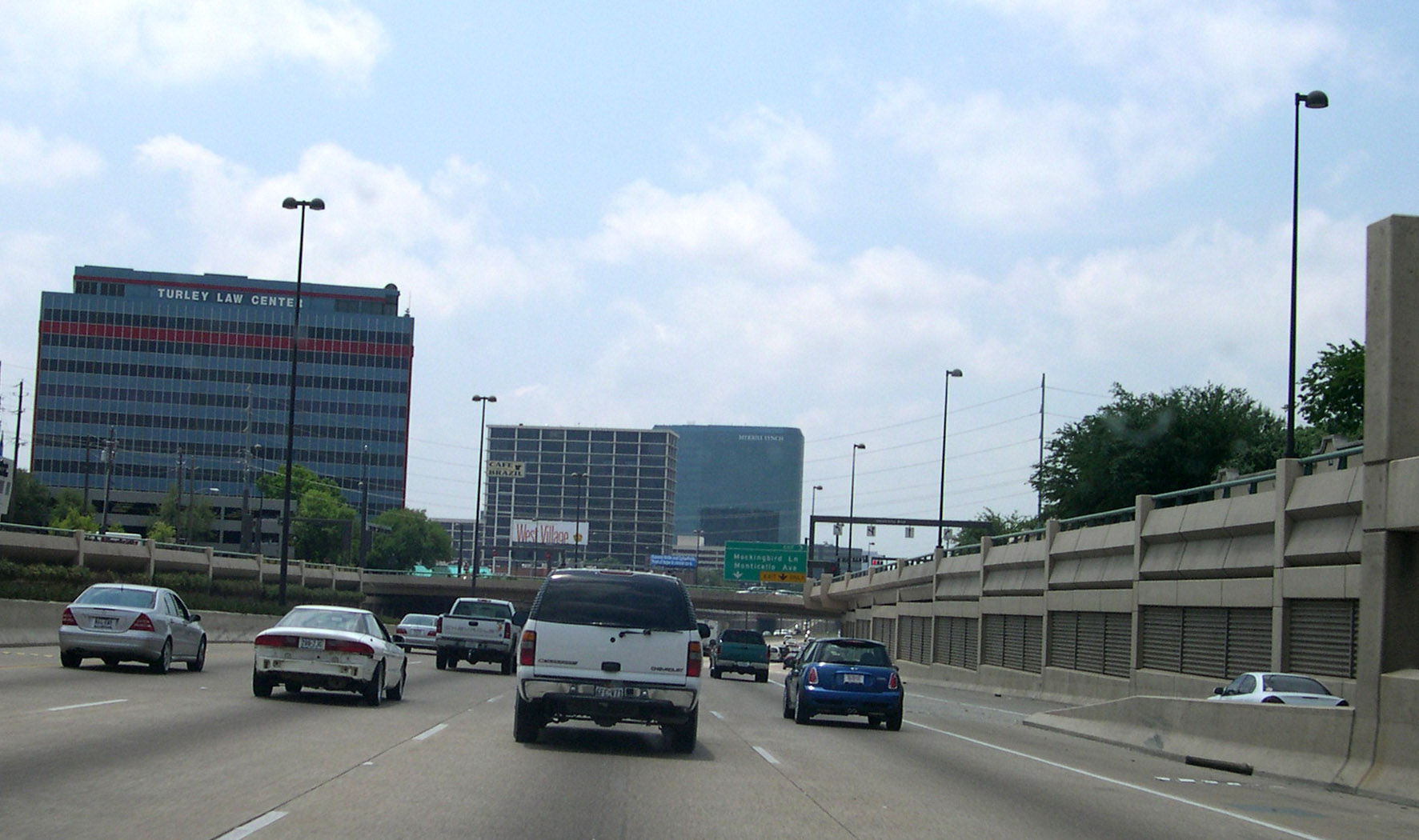
U.S. Route 75

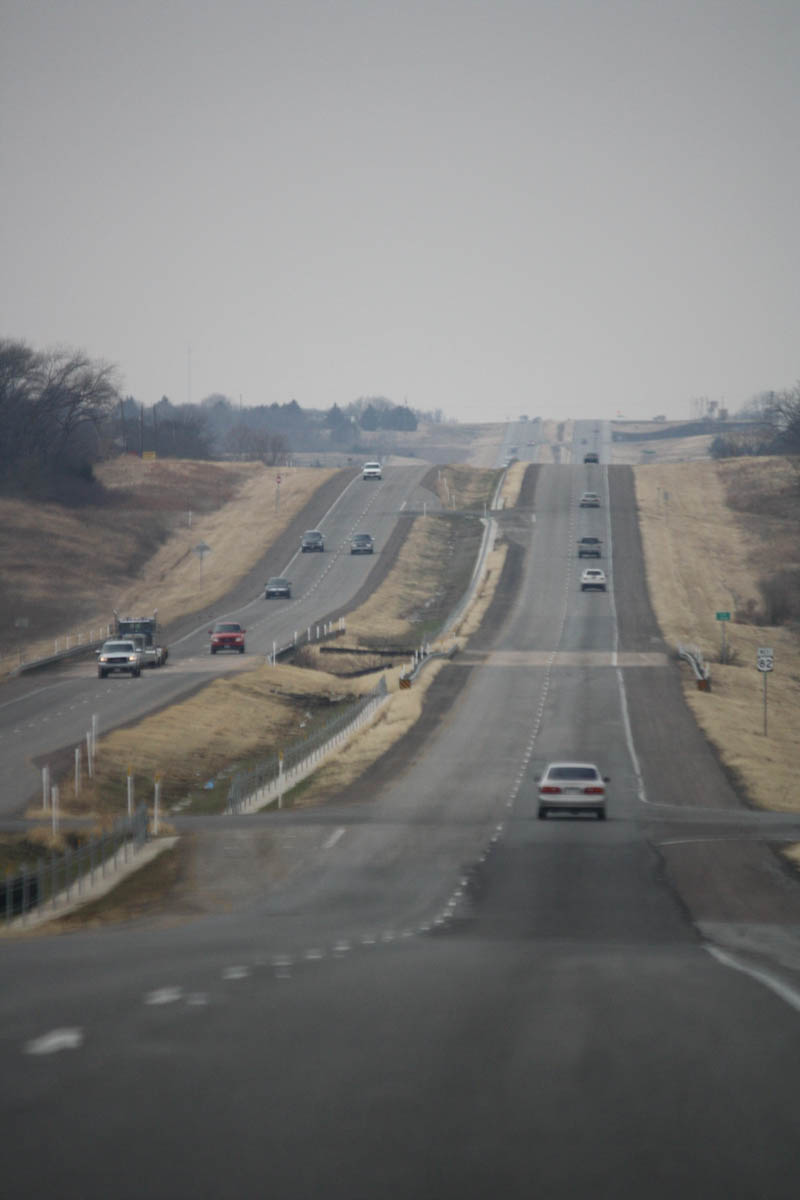
U.S. Route 82

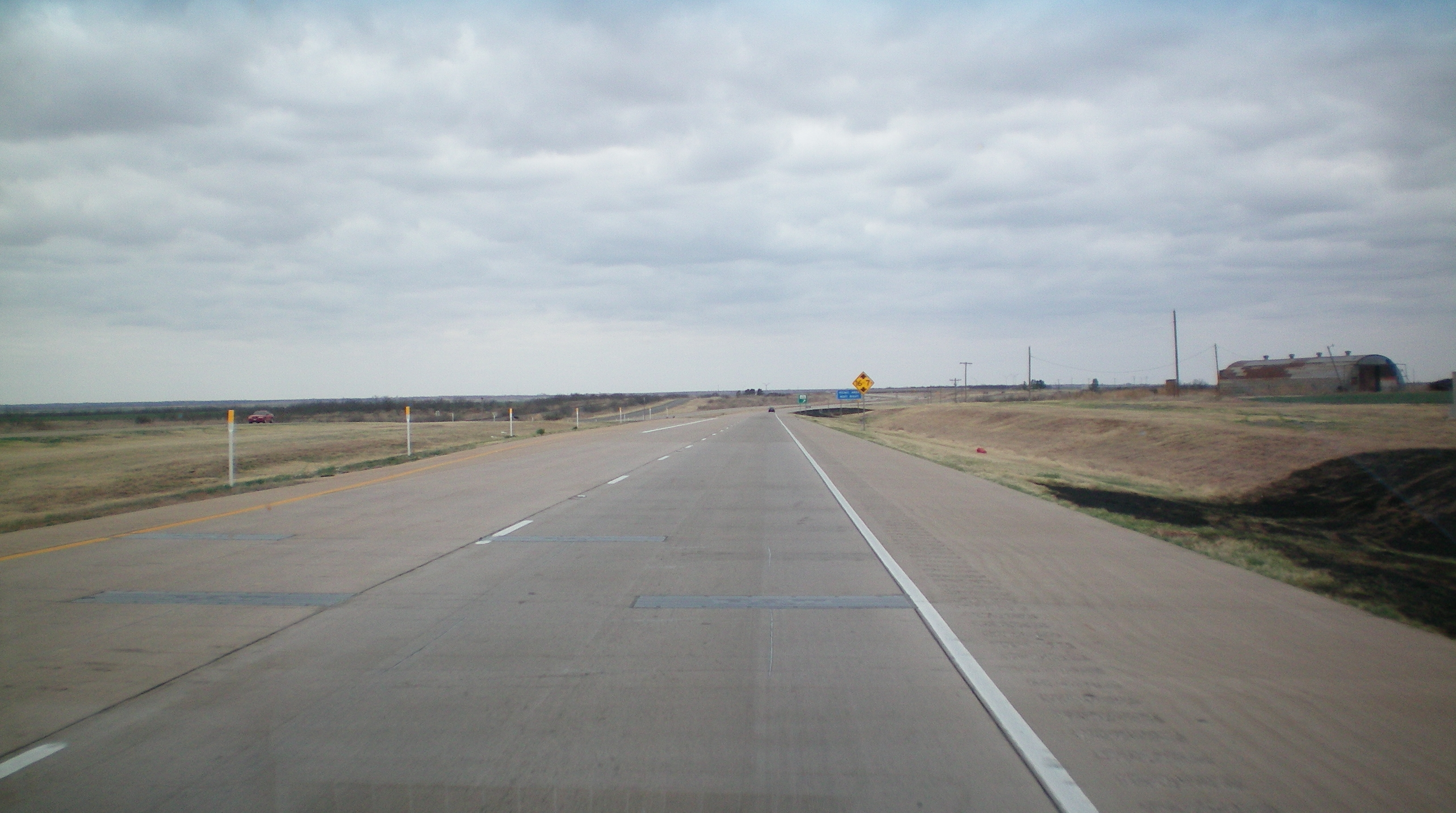
U.S. Route 287

==== Tollways ====
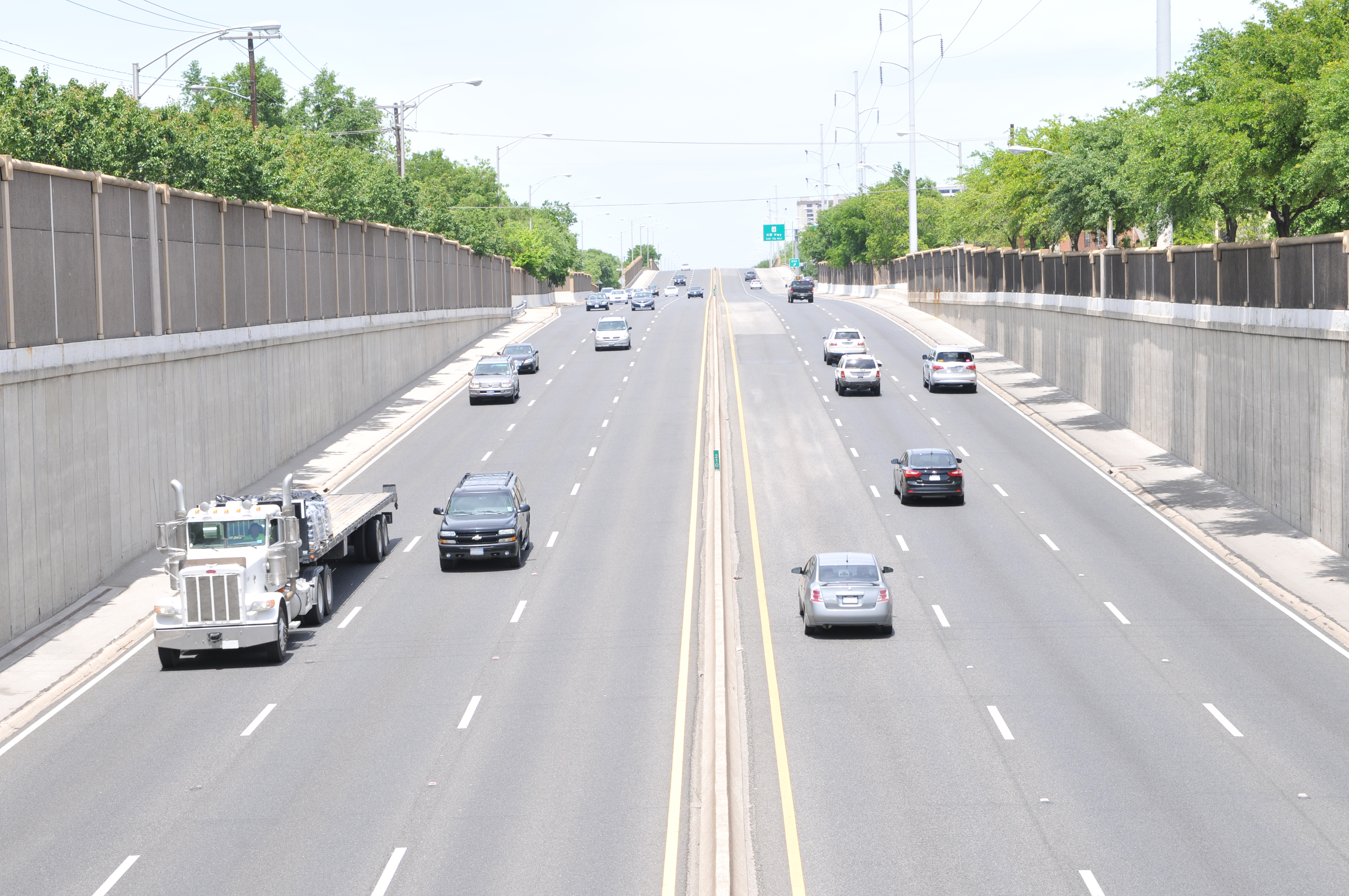
Dallas North Tollway

== See also ==
- List of geographical regions in Texas
