= Texas's 12th congressional district =

U.S. House district for Texas

Coordinates: 32°49′16″N 97°39′52″W

- Interactive map of district boundaries
- Representative: Craig Goldman; R–Fort Worth
- Distribution: 86.54% urban; 13.46% rural
- Population (2025): 887,462
- Median household income: $93,162
- Ethnicity: 54.9% White; 24.6% Hispanic; 11.4% Black; 4.2% Asian; 4.0% Two or more races; 0.9% other
- Cook PVI: R+11

Texas's 12th congressional district in the United States House of Representatives is in the north portion of the state of Texas. As of 2017, the 12th district contained 806,551 people and had a median income of $67,703. It consists of the western half of Tarrant County, as well as most of Parker County. The district also contains Texas Christian University. Fragments of the Dallas–Fort Worth metroplex are included in the district. The district is currently represented by Republican Craig Goldman, who was elected in 2024.

== Recent election results from statewide races ==
=== 2023–2027 boundaries ===
Year	Office	Results
2008	President	McCain 62–37%
2012	President	Romney 66–34%
2014	Senate	Cornyn 69–31%
2014	Governor	Abbott 65–35%
2016	President	Trump 60–35%
2018	Senate	Cruz 58–41%
2018	Governor	Abbott 63–36%
2018	Lt. Governor	Patrick 58–39%
2018	Attorney General	Paxton 58–40%
2018	Comptroller of Public Accounts	Hegar 60–36%
2020	President	Trump 58–40%
2020	Senate	Cornyn 60–37%
2022	Governor	Abbott 60–39%
2022	Lt. Governor	Patrick 58–39%
2022	Attorney General	Paxton 58–38%
2022	Comptroller of Public Accounts	Hegar 62–36%
2024	President	Trump 61–38%
2024	Senate	Cruz 57–40%

=== 2027–2033 boundaries ===
Year	Office	Results
2008	President	McCain 61–39%
2012	President	Romney 65–35%
2014	Senate	Cornyn 69–31%
2014	Governor	Abbott 64–36%
2016	President	Trump 59–36%
2018	Senate	Cruz 57–42%
2018	Governor	Abbott 62–37%
2018	Lt. Governor	Patrick 58–40%
2018	Attorney General	Paxton 57–41%
2018	Comptroller of Public Accounts	Hegar 59–37%
2020	President	Trump 58–40%
2020	Senate	Cornyn 60–37%
2022	Governor	Abbott 60–38%
2022	Lt. Governor	Patrick 58–39%
2022	Attorney General	Paxton 58–38%
2022	Comptroller of Public Accounts	Hegar 62–35%
2024	President	Trump 61–37%
2024	Senate	Cruz 58–40%
2026	Senate	Talarico 50–48%
2026	Governor	Abbott 50–48%

== Composition ==
For the 118th and successive Congresses (based on redistricting following the 2020 census), the district contains all or portions of the following counties and communities:

Parker County (17)

Aledo (part; also 25th), Annetta (part; also 25th), Annetta North (part; also 25th), Annetta South, Azle (shared with Tarrant County), Briar (shared with Tarrant County), Carter, Cool, Garner, Hudson Oaks, Millsaps, Mineral Wells (part; also 25th; shared with Palo Pinto), Reno (shared with Tarrant County), Sanctuary, Springtown, Weatherford (part; also 25th), Willow Park (part; also 25th)

Tarrant County (21)

Azle (shared with Tarrant County), Benbrook, Blue Mound, Briar (shared with Tarrant County), Crowley (part; also 25th; shared with Johnson County), Fort Worth (part; also 24th, 25th, 26th, and 33rd; shared with Denton, Johnson, Parker, and Wise counties), Haltom City (part; also 24th), Haslet (part; also 24th), Lakeside, Lake Worth, North Richland Hills (part; also 24th), Pecan Acres, Pelican Bay, Reno (shared with Parker County), Richland Hills, River Oaks, Saginaw, Sansom Park, Westover Hills, Westworth Village, White Settlement

== List of members representing the district ==
Member	Party	Term	Cong ess	Electoral history
District established March 4, 1893
Thomas M. Paschal (Castroville)	Democratic	March 4, 1893 – March 3, 1895	53rd	Elected in 1892. [data missing]
George H. Noonan (San Antonio)	Republican	March 4, 1895 – March 3, 1897	54th	Elected in 1894. [data missing]
James L. Slayden (San Antonio)	Democratic	March 4, 1897 – March 3, 1903	55th 56th 57th	Elected in 1896. Re-elected in 1898. Re-elected in 1900. Redistricted to the 14th district.
Oscar W. Gillespie (Fort Worth)	Democratic	March 4, 1903 – March 3, 1911	58th 59th 60th 61st	Elected in 1902. Re-elected in 1904. Re-elected in 1906. Re-elected in 1908. [data missing]
Oscar Callaway (Comanche)	Democratic	March 4, 1911 – March 3, 1917	62nd 63rd 64th	Elected in 1910. Re-elected in 1912. Re-elected in 1914. [data missing]
James C. Wilson (Fort Worth)	Democratic	March 4, 1917 – March 3, 1919	65th	Elected in 1916. Re-elected in 1918. Resigned to become U.S. District Judge
Vacant		March 3, 1919 – April 19, 1919	66th	
Fritz G. Lanham (Fort Worth)	Democratic	April 19, 1919 – January 3, 1947	66th 67th 68th 69th 70th 71st 72nd 73rd 74th 75th 76th 77th 78th 79th	Elected to finish Wilson's term. Re-elected in 1920. Re-elected in 1922. Re-elected in 1924. Re-elected in 1926. Re-elected in 1928. Re-elected in 1930. Re-elected in 1932. Re-elected in 1934. Re-elected in 1936; Re-elected in 1938. Re-elected in 1940. Re-elected in 1942. Re-elected in 1944. [data missing]
Wingate H. Lucas (Grapevine)	Democratic	January 3, 1947 – January 3, 1955	80th 81st 82nd 83rd	Elected in 1946. Re-elected in 1948. Re-elected in 1950. Re-elected in 1952. [data missing]
Jim Wright (Fort Worth)	Democratic	January 3, 1955 – June 30, 1989	84th 85th 86th 87th 88th 89th 90th 91st 92nd 93rd 94th 95th 96th 97th 98th 99th 100th 101st	Elected in 1954. Re-elected in 1956. Re-elected in 1958. Re-elected in 1960. Re-elected in 1962. Re-elected in 1964. Re-elected in 1966. Re-elected in 1968. Re-elected in 1970. Re-elected in 1972. Re-elected in 1974. Re-elected in 1976. Re-elected in 1978. Re-elected in 1980. Re-elected in 1982. Re-elected in 1984. Re-elected in 1986. Re-elected in 1988. Resigned.
Vacant		June 30, 1989 – September 12, 1989	101st	
Pete Geren (Fort Worth)	Democratic	September 12, 1989 – January 3, 1997	101st 102nd 103rd 104th	Elected to finish Wright's term. Re-elected in 1990. Re-elected in 1992. Re-elected in 1994. Retired.
Kay Granger (Fort Worth)	Republican	January 3, 1997 – January 3, 2025	105th 106th 107th 108th 109th 110th 111th 112th 113th 114th 115th 116th 117th 118th	Elected in 1996. Re-elected in 1998. Re-elected in 2000. Re-elected in 2002. Re-elected in 2004. Re-elected in 2006. Re-elected in 2008. Re-elected in 2010. Re-elected in 2012. Re-elected in 2014. Re-elected in 2016. Re-elected in 2018. Re-elected in 2020. Re-elected in 2022. Retired.
Craig Goldman (Fort Worth)	Republican	January 3, 2025 – present	119th	Elected in 2024. Re-elected in 2026.

== Election results ==
=== General election ===
US House election, 2024: Texas District 12
Party	Candidate	Votes	%
Republican	Craig Goldman	215,112	63.5
Democratic	Trey Hunt	123,666	36.5
Total votes		338,778	100.0

US House election, 2022: Texas District 12
Party	Candidate	Votes	%
Republican	Kay Granger (incumbent)	152,953	64.2
Democratic	Trey Hunt	85,026	35.7
Total votes		237,979	100.0
Republican hold			

US House election, 2020: Texas District 12
Party	Candidate	Votes	%
Republican	Kay Granger (incumbent)	233,853	63.7
Democratic	Lisa Welch	121,250	33.0
Libertarian	Trey Holcomb	11,918	3.3
Total votes		367,021	100.0
Republican hold			

US House election, 2018: Texas District 12
Party	Candidate	Votes	%	±%
Republican	Kay Granger (incumbent)	172,557	64.27	−5.13
Democratic	Vanessa Adia	90,994	33.89	+7.04
Libertarian	Jacob Leddy	4,940	1.84	−1.91
Total votes		268,491	100	
Republican hold				

US House election, 2016: Texas District 12
Party	Candidate	Votes	%	±%
Republican	Kay Granger (incumbent)	196,482	69.4	−1.91
Democratic	Bill Bradshaw	76,029	26.85	+0.54
Libertarian	Ed Colliver	10,604	3.75	+1.36
Total votes		283,115	100	
Republican hold				

US House election, 2014: Texas District 12
Party	Candidate	Votes	%	±%
Republican	Kay Granger (Incumbent)	113,186	71.31	+0.41
Democratic	Mark Greene	41,757	26.31	+0.04
Libertarian	Ed Colliver	3,787	2.39	−0.02
Total votes		158,730	100	
Republican hold				

US House election, 2012: Texas District 12
Party	Candidate	Votes	%	±%
Republican	Kay Granger (incumbent)	175,649	70.90	−0.95
Democratic	Dave Robinson	66,080	26.27	+1.54
Libertarian	Matthew Solodow	5,983	2.41	−0.59
Majority		109,569	44.23	−2.49
Turnout		247,712		+61.99
Republican hold				

US House election, 2010: Texas District 12
Party	Candidate	Votes	%	±%
Republican	Kay Granger (incumbent)	109,882	71.85	+4.26
Democratic	Tracey Smith	38,434	25.13	−5.47
Libertarian	Matthew Solodow	4,601	3.00	+1.20
Majority		71,448	46.72	+9.73
Turnout		152,917		−43.10
Republican hold				

US House election, 2008: Texas District 12
Party	Candidate	Votes	%	±%
Republican	Kay Granger (incumbent)	181,662	67.59	+0.65
Democratic	Tracey Smith	82,250	30.60	−0.48
Libertarian	Shiloh Sidney Shambaugh	4,842	1.80	−0.16
Majority		99,412	36.99	
Turnout		268,754		
Republican hold				

US House election, 2006: Texas District 12
Party	Candidate	Votes	%	±%
Republican	Kay Granger (incumbent)	98,371	66.94	+2.88
Democratic	John R. Morris	69,148	31.08	−3.40
Libertarian	Gardner Osborne	3,251	1.96	+1.96
Majority		52,695	36.2	
Turnout		145,396		
Republican hold				

US House election, 2004: Texas District 12
Party	Candidate	Votes	%	±%
Republican	Kay Granger (incumbent)	127,870	63.76	
Democratic	Tracey Smith	69,148	34.48	
Majority		106,906	44.6	
Turnout		239,538		
Republican hold				

== Historical district boundaries ==
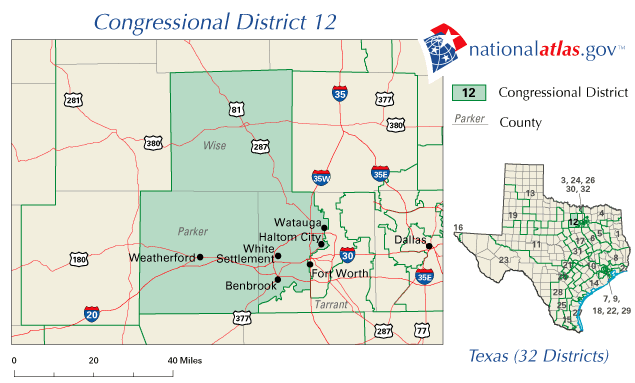
2007–2013

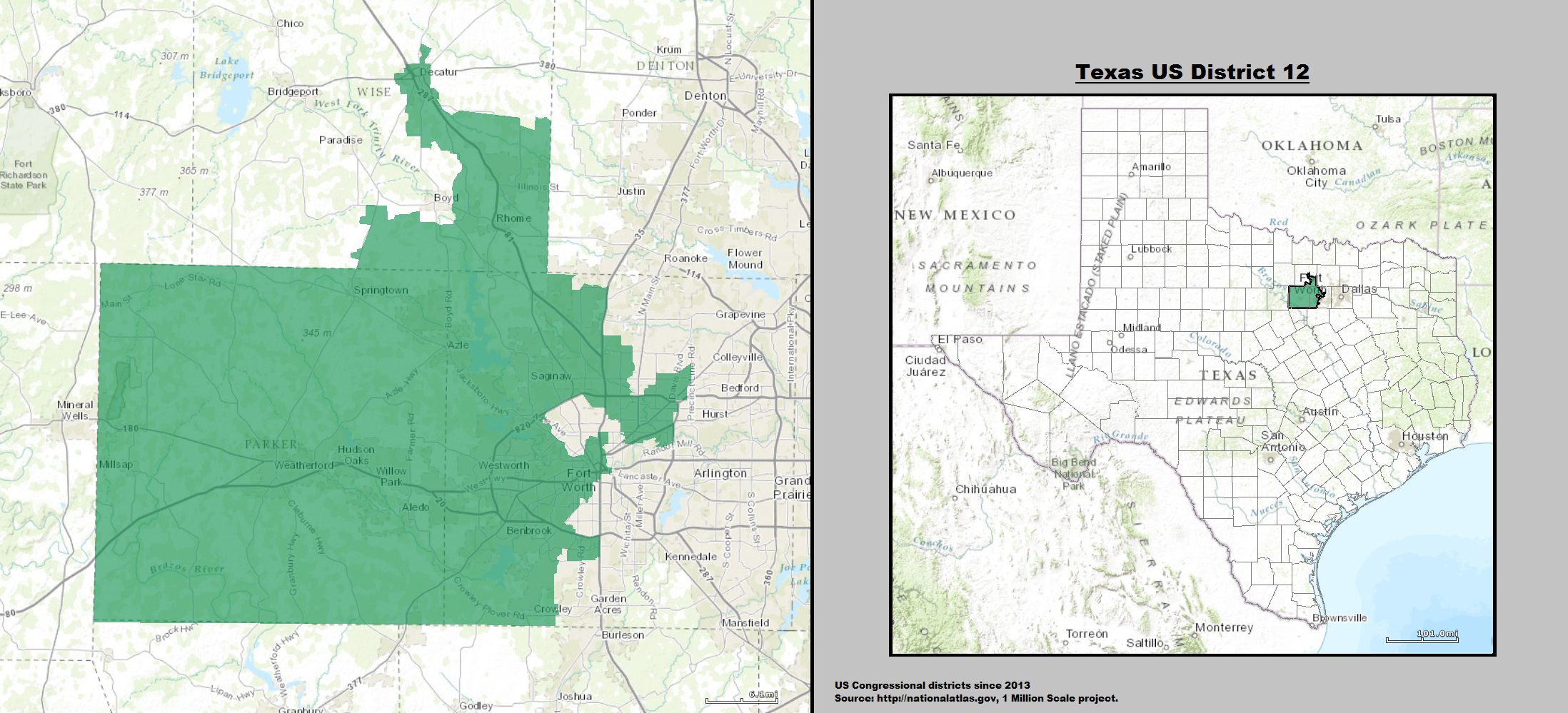
2013–2023

== See also ==
- List of United States congressional districts

U.S. House of Representatives
Preceded by Massachusetts's 8th congressional district	Home district of the speaker January 6, 1987 – June 6, 1989	Succeeded by Washington's 5th congressional district
