= George Noonan =

George Noonan may refer to:

- George H. Noonan (1828–1907), U.S. Representative from Texas
- George Garry Noonan, state legislator in Illinois
- George Noonan (footballer) (1894–1972), Australian rules footballer
