= Nic Shimonek =

American football player (born 1994)

Profile
- Position: Quarterback

Personal information
- Born: September 22, 1994 (age 32)
- Listed height: 6 ft 3 in (1.91 m)
- Listed weight: 220 lb (100 kg)

Career information
- High school: Mildred (Mildred, Texas)
- College: Iowa (2013); Texas Tech (2014–2017)
- NFL draft: 2018: undrafted

Career history
- Los Angeles Chargers (2018)*
- * Offseason or practice squad member only

Nic Shimonek (born August 22, 1994) is an American former football quarterback. He played college football for the Iowa Hawkeyes and Texas Tech Red Raiders.

== Early life ==
Shimonek attended Mildred High School in Mildred, Texas. As a senior, he threw for 2,718 yards and 35 touchdowns with six interceptions, while also rushing for 811 yards rushing and 16 touchdowns. Following his high school career, Shimonek committed to play college football at the University of Iowa.

== College career ==
After redshirting at Iowa in 2013, Shimonek transferred to Texas Tech University. He was ineligible to play in 2014, and he played sparingly in 2015. Shimonek entered the 2016 season as the backup to Patrick Mahomes. After Mahomes was injured in a game against Kansas, Shimonek stepped in and threw for 271 yards and four touchdowns, solidifying a 55–19 victory. He finished the 2016 season, throwing for 464 yards and six touchdowns in four games. Entering the 2017 season, Shimonek was named the Red Raider's starting quarterback. In his first career start against Eastern Washington, he threw for 384 yards and three touchdowns in a 56–10 rout. Shimonek finished the season passing for 3,963 yards and 33 touchdowns.

=== Statistics ===
Season	Team	Games			Passing								Rushing			
Season	Team	GP	GS	Record	Cmp	Att	Pct	Yds	Avg	TD	Int	Rtg	Att	Yds	Avg	TD
2013	Iowa	Redshirted (redshirt)														
2014	Texas Tech	DNP														
2015	Texas Tech	2	0	0–0	1	2	50.0	18	9.0	0	0	125.6	0	0	0.0	0
2016	Texas Tech	4	0	0–0	38	58	65.5	464	8.0	6	1	163.4	5	-31	-6.2	0
2017	Texas Tech	13	12	5–7	328	493	66.5	3,963	8.0	33	10	152.1	59	-66	-1.1	1
Career		19	12	5−7	367	553	66.4	4,445	8.0	39	11	153.2	64	-97	-1.5	1

== Professional career ==
After going undrafted in the 2018 NFL draft, Shimonek signed with the Los Angeles Chargers as an undrafted free agent. On September 1, 2018, he was waived by the Chargers.
