= Reno, Texas =

Reno is the name of some places in the U.S. state of Texas:

- Reno, Lamar County, Texas, a suburb of Paris, Texas
- Reno, Parker County, Texas
