= James Azle Steward =

American doctor and land owner

James Azle Steward (1831 – 1889) was an American medical doctor, land owner and founder of Azle, Texas.

Born in Tennessee, Steward moved to Texas prior to 1860. He donated land in 1883 for a townsite which ended up being named in his honour. He was also instrumental in setting up establishments in the town such as the Ash Creek Cemetery and the Azle Christian Church. Steward died in 1889.
