= Pelican Bay =

Pelican Bay is the name of several places in the United States:

- Pelican Bay, Florida
- Pelican Bay, Texas
- Pelican Bay, a bay in Anguilla
- Pelican Bay, a bay in North Myrtle Beach, South Carolina
- Pelican Bay State Prison, a supermax prison in California
