= Mildred High School (Texas) =

Location
- 5475 S Hwy 287; Corsicana, Texas 75109-9328; United States; 32.0357°N 96.3775°W

Information
- School type: Public high school
- School district: Mildred Independent School District
- Principal: Aaron Kinney
- Teaching staff: 37.43 (FTE)
- Grades: 9 - 12
- Enrollment: 248 (2025-16)
- Student to teacher ratio: 11.51
- Colors: Maroon & White
- Athletics conference: UIL Class 3A Division II
- Mascot: Eagle
- Website: Mildred High School website

Mildred High School is a 3A high school located in Mildred, Texas (USA). It is part of the Mildred Independent School District located in southeastern Navarro County. Even though the school is located near Mildred, Texas, it is often, however inaccurately referred to as, Corsicana Mildred. In 2011, the school was rated "Academically Acceptable" by the Texas Education Agency.

== UIL Academics ==
=== Speech and Debate ===
The Mildred Speech and Debate Team currently participates in UIL, NSDA, and TFA.

UIL Academic Success:

- State Champions: Cross-Examination Debate - 2019(3A), 2018(3A), 2017(3A); State Speech Team Championship - 2016(3A); Prose Interpretation - 2015(3A)
- State Runners-up: Informative Extemporaneous Speaking - 2017(3A), 2016(3A), 2015(3A); Cross-Examination Debate - 2013(2A); Prose Interpretation - 2014(2A)
- State Bronze Medalists: Student Congress - 2017(3A), 2015(3A); Cross-Examination Debate - 2016(3A), 2014(2A); Persuasive Extemporaneous Speaking - 2022 (3A)
- State Medalists: Informative Extemporaneous Speaking 4th Place - 2016(3A); Cross-Examination Debate - 2015(3A); Prose Interpretation 4th Place - 2013(2A), 2012(2A); Poetry Interpretation 4th Place — 2013(2A); Poetry Interpretation 5th Place - 2016(3A); Congress 5th Place - 2022(3A); Congress 6th Place - 2018(3A)

TFA State:

Mildred Speech and debate qualified a Cross-Examination debate team for the TFA State meet in 2017 and 2018. Mildred qualified a Humorous Interpretation in 2015.

Mildred has qualified Cross-Examination debate teams to the NSDA National Tournament in 2018, 2017, and 2014. A Humorous Interpretation entry qualified for the National Tournament in 2015.

== Athletics ==
The Mildred Eagles compete in the following sports:

Cross Country, Volleyball, Football, Basketball, Powerlifting, Golf, Track, Softball & Baseball

State Runners-up: Baseball - 1995(1A), 2008(2A)

State Runners-up: Football - 2012 (2A)

State Bronze Medalist: Golf - 2024(3A) Landon Reece

State Runners-up: Golf - 2025 (2A)

State Champions: Golf - 2026 (2A)
