= Mildred Independent School District =

School district in Texas

Mildred Independent School District is a public school district based in Mildred, Texas (USA) and located in southeastern Navarro County, Texas. The district has a Corsicana address since there is not a post office in Mildred. In addition to Mildred, the district serves the cities of Eureka and Navarro.

== Schools ==
Mildred ISD has two campuses:

- Mildred High School (Grades 6-12)
- Mildred Elementary School (Grades PK-5).

In 2009, the school district was rated "recognized" by the Texas Education Agency.
