= Nortex Regional Planning Commission =

- Logo

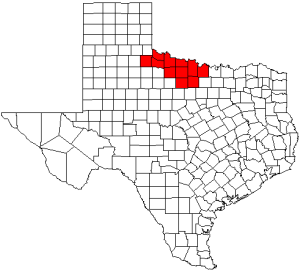
- Map of Texas highlighting counties served by the Nortex Regional Planning Commission
- Formation: June 1966
- Type: Voluntary association of governments
- Region served: 9,461 sq mi (24,500 km^{2})
- Members: 11 counties

Historical population
Year	Pop.	±%
2000	224,366	—
2010	222,860	−0.7%
2020	216,808	−2.7%

The Nortex Regional Planning Commission (NORTEX) is a voluntary association of cities, counties and special districts in North Texas.

Based in Wichita Falls, the Nortex Regional Planning Commission is a member of the Texas Association of Regional Councils.

== Counties served ==
- Archer
- Baylor
- Clay
- Cottle
- Foard
- Hardeman
- Jack
- Montague
- Wichita
- Wilbarger
- Young

== Largest cities in the region ==
- Wichita Falls
- Vernon
- Burkburnett
- Graham
- Iowa Park
- Bowie
- Jacksboro
