= James Casey (American football) =

American football player and coach (born 1984)

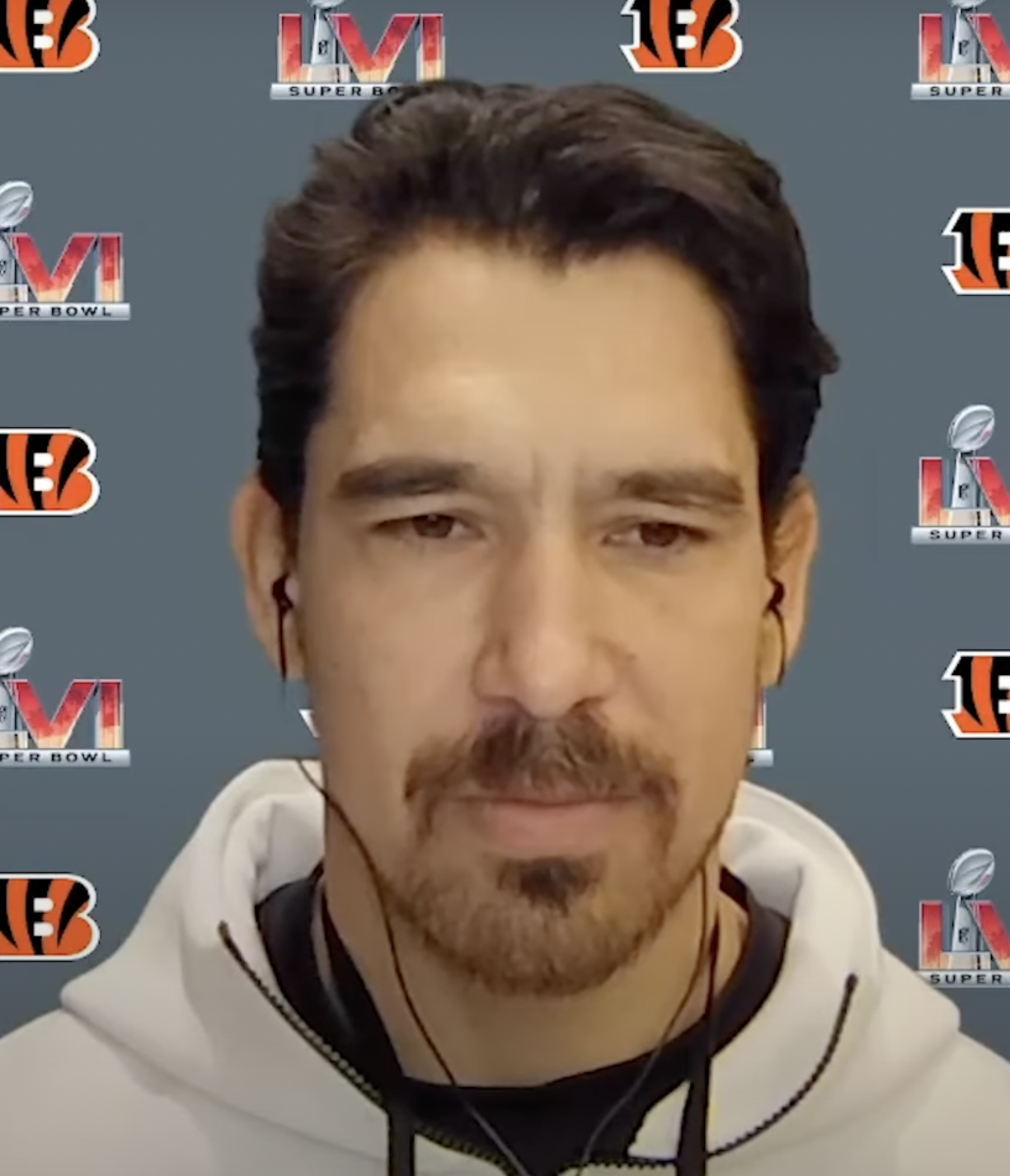
- Casey in 2022.

Cincinnati Bengals
- Title: Tight ends coach

Personal information
- Born: September 22, 1984 (age 42); Fort Worth, Texas, U.S.
- Listed height: 6 ft 3 in (1.91 m)
- Listed weight: 240 lb (109 kg)

Career information
- Position: Tight end (No. 86, 85, 80)
- High school: Azle (Azle, Texas)
- College: Rice
- NFL draft: 2009: 5th round, 152nd overall pick

Career history

Playing
- Houston Texans (2009–2012); Philadelphia Eagles (2013–2014); Denver Broncos (2015)

Coaching
- Houston (2016) Offensive assistant; Houston (2017–2018) Tight ends coach; Cincinnati Bengals (2019–2025) Tight ends coach; Cincinnati Bengals (2026–present) Tight ends coach & run game coordinator

Awards and highlights
- 4 NCAA Division I tight end records

Career NFL statistics
- Receptions: 72
- Receiving yards: 872
- Receiving touchdowns: 6
- Stats at Pro Football Reference

James Byron Casey (born September 22, 1984) is an American professional football coach and former player who is the tight ends coach and run game coordinator for the Cincinnati Bengals of the National Football League (NFL). He played in the NFL as a tight end and fullback. He was selected by the Houston Texans in the fifth round of the 2009 NFL draft and has also played for the Philadelphia Eagles and Denver Broncos of the NFL. He played college football for the Rice Owls and played baseball and football at Azle High School.

== Early and personal life ==
Casey lost his mother at the age of 16, when a fire burned their home. He was only left with his backpack and the clothes he was wearing. He received support from citizens of Azle, Texas, who provided clothes, shelter and money to further his studies and his athletic career. He lived in various locations, with his older sister for a while, with his future wife’s family, with the trainer at Azle High School.

Casey is married to his high school sweetheart, Kylie, and has two sons with her.

== Baseball career ==
Casey was selected by the Chicago White Sox in the seventh round of the 2003 MLB draft. He played in the White Sox organization for three years before retiring after 2006 to pursue a career in football.

== College career ==
After retiring from baseball Casey chose to play college football at Rice University. As a freshman in 2007 Casey started four of 12 games recording 46 receptions for 585 yards and four touchdowns. He also had 144 rushing yards on 45 carries and five touchdowns as a running back and completed two of seven passes for 32 yards and an interception as a quarterback. He also played seven different positions in a game against Southern Mississippi.

As a sophomore in 2008 Casey started all 13 games at tight end earning third-team All-American and first-team All-Conference USA honors. He finished the season setting a single-season school record for receptions with 111 for 1,329 yards and 12 touchdowns. He also added 241 rushing yards on 57 carries and six touchdowns and completed two of five passes for five yards. Casey ended his collegiate career with NCAA tight end records for most passes caught in a season, most passes caught per game in a season, most yards gained in a season, and most yards per game in a season.

After his sophomore year Casey announced that he would enter the 2009 NFL draft.

Casey graduated from Rice with a triple major in Economics, Sports Management, and Managerial Studies and a 3.84 GPA.

== Professional career ==
Pre-draft measurables
Height	Weight	Arm length	Hand span	40-yard dash	10-yard split	20-yard split	20-yard shuttle	Three-cone drill	Vertical jump	Broad jump	Bench press
6 ft 3 in (1.91 m)	246 lb (112 kg)	30 5/8 in (0.78 m)	9 1/2 in (0.24 m)	4.69 s	1.59 s	2.73 s	4.48 s	7.00 s	36.0 in (0.91 m)	9 ft 3 in (2.82 m)	28 reps
All values from NFL Combine

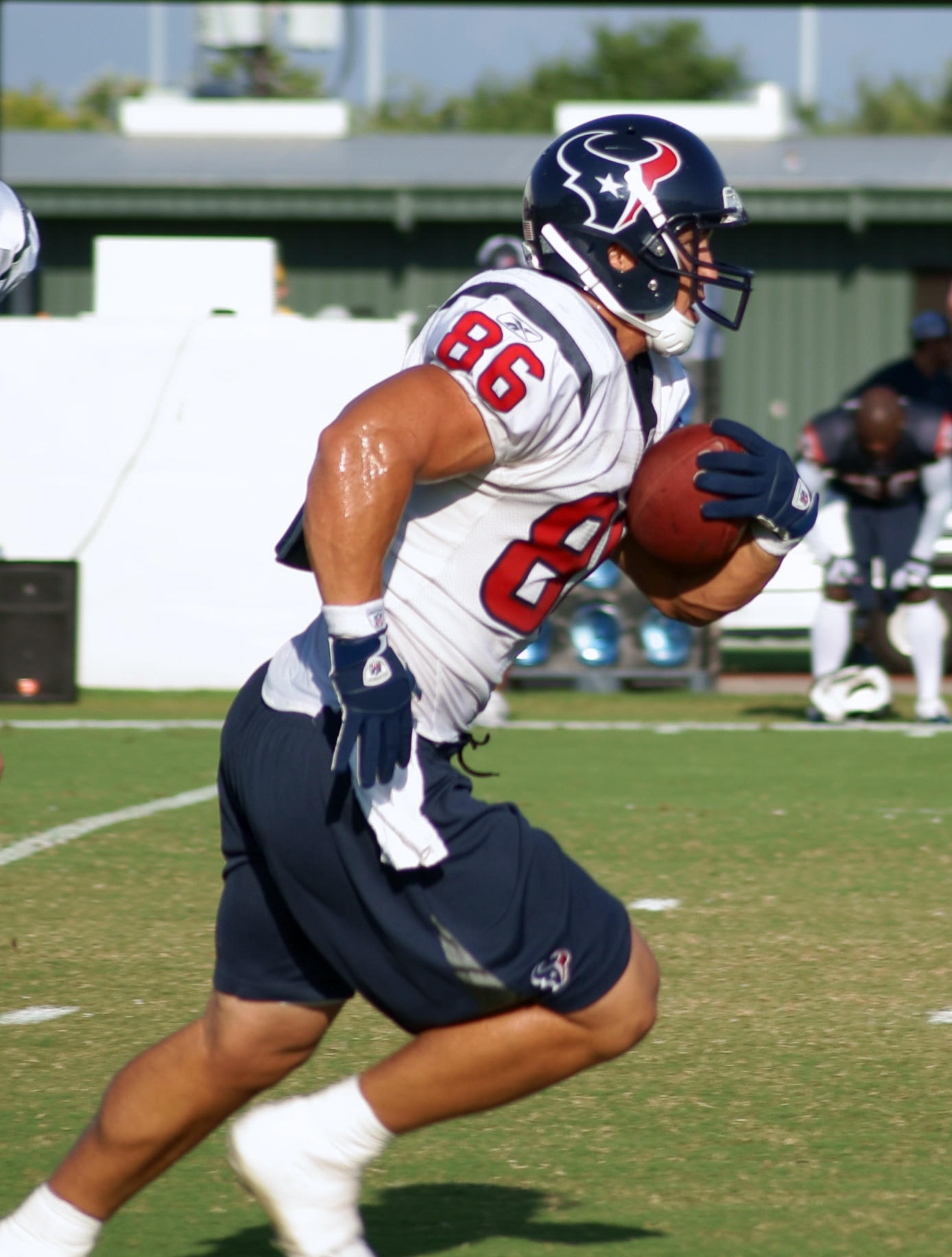
Casey at the Texans 2010 training camp.

=== Houston Texans ===
Casey was drafted by the Houston Texans in the fifth round of the 2009 NFL draft with the 152nd overall pick. In his first game as starter, Casey caught three passes for 29 yards, but did not record a carry. In 2011, Casey was named the Texans starting fullback.

=== Philadelphia Eagles ===
Casey signed a three-year, $14.6 million contract with the Philadelphia Eagles on March 12, 2013. Casey was released by the Eagles on February 19, 2015.

=== Denver Broncos ===
Casey signed a one-year deal with the Broncos on April 11, 2015. He was reunited with his former Texans head coach, Gary Kubiak.

On October 9, 2015, Casey was released from the Broncos to make room for Derek Wolfe, who came off a four-game suspension.

== Coaching career ==
=== University of Houston ===
On January 13, 2016, it was announced that Casey had joined the coaching staff of the Houston Cougars football team as an offensive analyst.

On December 22, 2016, was promoted to tight ends coach under new Houston head coach, Major Applewhite.

=== Cincinnati Bengals ===
On February 7, 2019, Casey was hired by the Cincinnati Bengals to serve as the team's tight ends coach. On February 22, 2026, Casey added the role of run game coordinator to his title.
