= Thomas M. Paschal =

American politician

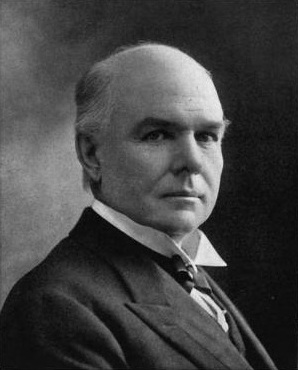

Member of the U.S. House of Representatives from Texas's 12th district
- In office March 4, 1893 – March 3, 1895
- Preceded by: District created
- Succeeded by: George H. Noonan

Personal details
- Born: Thomas Moore Paschal; December 15, 1845 Alexandria, Louisiana, U.S.
- Died: January 28, 1919 (aged 73) New York City, U.S.
- Resting place: Mission Burial Park, San Antonio, Texas, U.S.
- Party: Democratic
- Education: St. Mary's College; Centre College
- Profession: Politician, lawyer, judge

Thomas Moore Paschal (December 15, 1845 – January 28, 1919) was a U.S. Representative from Texas.

Born in Alexandria, Rapides Parish, Louisiana, Paschal moved with his parents to San Antonio, Texas, in 1846. He was educated in private schools. He attended St. Mary's College, San Antonio, Texas. He was graduated from Centre College, Danville, Kentucky, in 1866. He studied law. He was admitted to the bar in 1867 and commenced practice in San Antonio. He was city attorney in 1867. He served as United States commissioner for the western district of Texas 1867 to 1869. He served as judge of the district criminal court for San Antonio in 1870 and 1871. He moved to Castroville, Texas, in 1870. He served as district attorney of the twenty-fourth district from 1871 to 1875. He moved to Brackett, King County, in 1873.

Paschal was elected judge of the thirty-eighth judicial district in 1876. He was re-elected in 1880 and 1884, and served until 1892. He was appointed by Governor Coke as extradition agent between the United States and Mexico in 1876 and re-appointed by Governor Roberts in 1880. He returned to Castroville in 1885. His daughter married T.P. O'Connor MP in 1885 the same year O'Connor was elected to the House of Commons of the United Kingdom.

Paschal was elected as a Democrat to the 53rd Congress (March 4, 1893 – March 3, 1895). He was an unsuccessful candidate for re-nomination in 1894. He resumed the practice of law in San Antonio, Texas. He served as delegate to the Democratic National Convention in 1896. He died in New York City, January 28, 1919. He was interred in Mission Burial Park, San Antonio, Texas.

== Sources ==
- United States Congress. "Thomas M. Paschal (id: P000094)". Biographical Directory of the United States Congress.

U.S. House of Representatives
Preceded by District created	Member of the U.S. House of Representatives from Texas's 12th congressional district 1893–1895	Succeeded by George H. Noonan
