= Robert Landers =

American golfer and cattle farmer

Personal information
- Nationality: United States
- Born: January 6, 1944 (age 82) Azle, Texas, U.S.

Career
- Sport: Golf
- Status: Professional
- Former tour: Champions Tour

Best results in major championships
- Masters Tournament: DNP
- PGA Championship: DNP
- U.S. Open: CUT: 1980
- The Open Championship: DNP

Robert Landers (born January 6, 1944) is an American cattle farmer and golfer who gained fame in 1995 by playing on the Senior PGA Tour.

== Career ==
From Azle, Texas, Landers took up golf at the relatively late age of 28. Despite an unorthodox swing, a preference for playing in sneakers instead of golf shoes, and using golf clubs that he assembled himself, Landers became a popular figure by making the Senior PGA Tour after receiving his card at qualifying school, and was followed by fans who called themselves the "Moo Crew." He played on the tour in 1995 and 1996. His best finish was a T-14 at the 1996 Kroger Senior Classic.

Befitting his image, Landers was sponsored by the workclothes manufacturer Dickies.
