= Azle Independent School District =

Public school district in Azle, Texas

Location
- 301 Church St. Azle, Texas ESC Region 11 United States
- Coordinates: 32°53′47″N 97°32′35″W

District information
- Type: Independent school district
- Motto: It makes a difference to this ONE
- Grades: Pre-K through 12
- Superintendent: Todd Smith
- Schools: 12 (2020–21)
- NCES District ID: 4809200

Students and staff
- Students: 7,100 (2025-26)
- Teachers: 455 (2020–21) (on full-time equivalent (FTE) basis)
- Student–teacher ratio: 15.87 (2009–10)
- Athletic conference: UIL Class 5A football and basketball
- District mascot: Hornets
- Colors: Green, White

Other information
- TEA District Accountability Rating for 2011–12: Academically Acceptable
- Website: www.azleisd.net

Azle Independent School District is a public school district based in Azle, Texas, United States. The district covers northwestern Tarrant County, northeastern Parker County, and a small portion of southern Wise County. In addition to Azle, the district serves the communities of Lakeside, Pelican Bay, Sanctuary, and portions of Reno and Briar.

== Finances ==
As of the 2018–2019 school year, the appraised valuation of property in the district was $2,351,893,000. The maintenance and operations tax rate was $1.170, and the interest and sinking fund tax rate was $0.1590 per $100 of appraised valuation.

== Academic achievement ==
In 2011, the school district was rated "academically acceptable" by the Texas Education Agency. About 49% of districts in Texas in 2011 received the same rating. No state accountability ratings will be given to districts in 2012. A school district in Texas can receive one of four possible rankings from the Texas Education Agency: Exemplary (the highest possible ranking), Recognized, Academically Acceptable, and Academically Unacceptable (the lowest possible ranking).

Historical district TEA accountability ratings

- 2011: Academically Acceptable
- 2010: Recognized
- 2009: Recognized
- 2008: Academically Acceptable
- 2007: Academically Acceptable
- 2006: Academically Acceptable
- 2005: Academically Acceptable
- 2004: Academically Acceptable

== Schools ==
School name	Grades	Additional information
Azle High School	9-12	
Azle Junior High School	6-8	Grades 7-8 until 2026 school year.
Santo J. Forte Junior High School	6-8	Grades 7-8 until 2026 school year.
Azle Elementary School	PK-5	Grades PK-4 until 2026 school year.
Cross Timbers Elementary School	PK-5	Grades PK-4 until 2026 school year.
Eagle Heights Elementary School	PK-5	Grades PK-4 until 2026 school year.
Hilltop Elementary School	PK-5	Grades PK-4 until 2026 school year.
Liberty Elementary School	PK-5	Grades PK-4 until 2026 school year.
Silver Creek Elementary School	PK-5	Grades PK-4 until 2026 school year.
Walnut Creek Elementary School	PK-5	Grades PK-4 until 2026 school year.
W.E. Hoover Elementary School	PK-5	Grades 5-6 until 2026 school year.

=== Alternative schools ===
- DAEP (Disciplinary Alternative Education Program)
- Hornet Academy

== Special programs ==
=== Fine arts ===
Azle High School has a band program, known as the Marching Green Pride, as well as other programs and classes including choir, art, dance, theatre, and photography and film-making.

=== Athletics ===
Azle High School participates in the boys' sports of baseball, basketball, football, tennis, soccer, and wrestling. The school participates in the girls' sports of basketball, soccer, softball, tennis, volleyball, and wrestling.

For the 2015 through 2016 school years, Azle High School will play football in UIL Class 5A. Their mascot is a muscular green and black hornet named "Buzzy".

== Alumni ==
- Chas Skelly, professional Mixed Martial Artist, current UFC Featherweight
- James Casey (American football), former NFL tight end, current tight ends coach with Houston Cougars football
- Montana De La Rosa, professional Mixed Martial Artist, current UFC Flyweight

== See also ==
- List of school districts in Texas
- List of high schools in Texas
