= James Luther Slayden =

American politician (1853–1924)

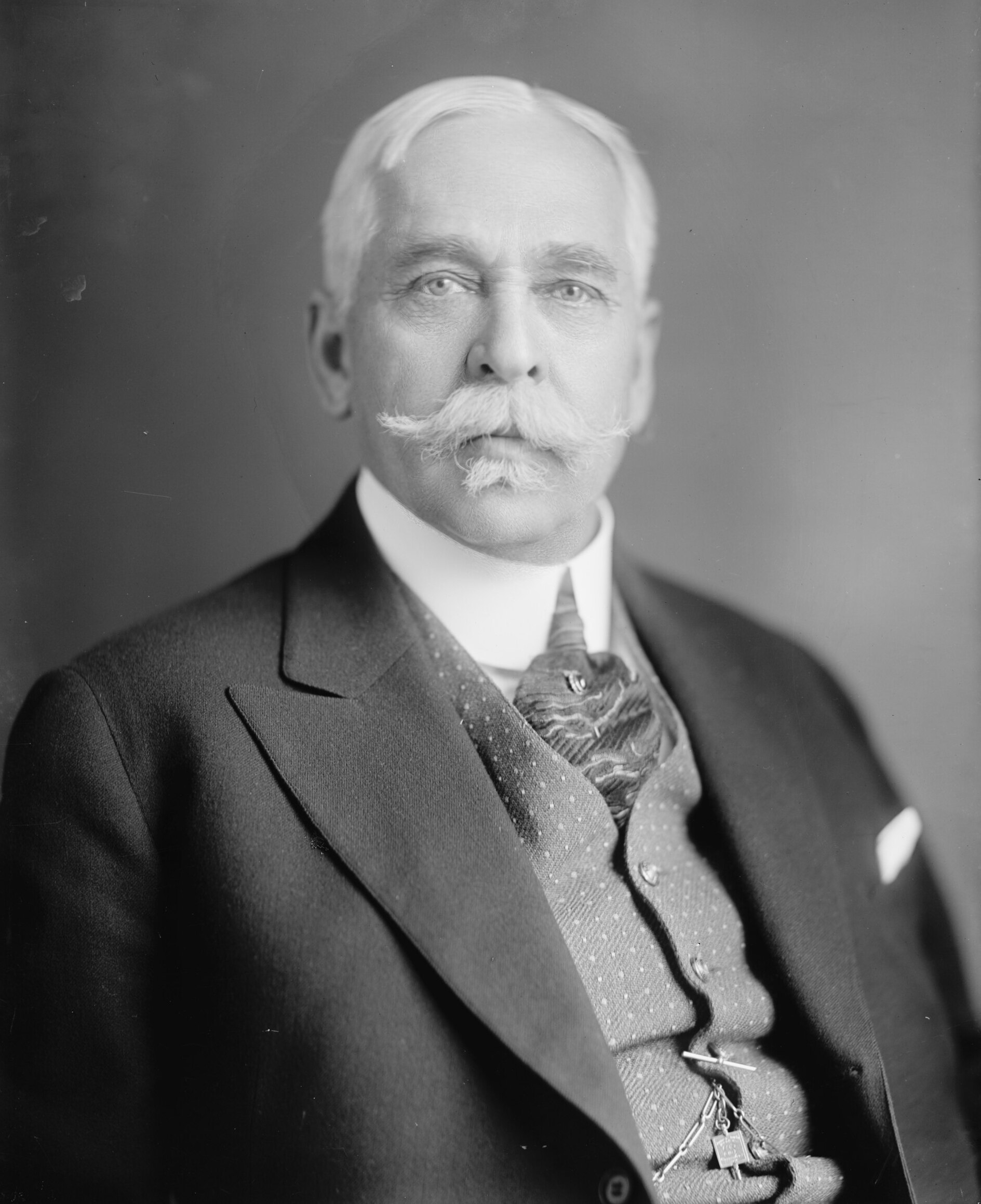
- Photo by Harris & Ewing, circa 1918. Library of Congress

Member of the U.S. House of Representatives from Texas
- In office March 4, 1897 – March 3, 1919
- Preceded by: George H. Noonan
- Succeeded by: Carlos Bee
- Constituency: 12th district (1897–1903); 14th district (1903–1919)

Texas State House of Representatives
- In office January 10, 1893 – January 18, 1895

Personal details
- Born: June 1, 1853 Mayfield, Kentucky, U.S.
- Died: February 24, 1924 (aged 70) San Antonio, Texas, U.S.
- Party: Democrat
- Education: Washington and Lee University
- Occupation: cotton merchant, rancher

James Luther Slayden (June 1, 1853 – February 24, 1924) was an American politician, cotton merchant, and rancher. He was elected from San Antonio to United States House of Representatives, serving eleven consecutive terms.

== Early life and education ==
James Luther Slayden was born in Mayfield, Kentucky. His parents were Letitia E. (née Beadles) and Thomas A. Slayden. After his father died in 1869, he moved with his mother and siblings to New Orleans, Louisiana. There, he attended common schools and worked for two years. From 1872 and 1873, he attended Washington and Lee University in Lexington, Virginia. There, he was a member of the Fraternity of Delta Psi (St. Anthony Hall). He returned to New Orleans in 1873, where he worked until he moved to Texas in November 1876.

== Career ==
Slayden moved to San Antonio, Texas, in 1879 and became a rancher cotton merchant.

He became active in Democratic Party and was elected to the Texas House of Representatives in 1892. There, he served on the Finance Committee; Insurance, Statistics and History Committee; the Judicial Districts Committee; the Public Buildings and Grounds Committee; the State Affairs Committee; and the Town and City Corporations Committee. He worked to develop trade between Texas and other areas, and the construction railroads in Texas. After serving in the state legislature from January 10, to January 8, 1893, he declined renomination and returned to ranching.

In 1896, Slayden was elected to the United States Congress representing Texas' 12th district as a Democrat. He was re-elected in 1898 and 1900, serving in total from 1897 to 1903. In 1903, he was redistricted to Texas's 14th congressional district and was elected to serve from 1903 to 1919. He served a total of eleven terms in Congress.

In Congress Slayden promoted the growth of the railroad system in Texas. He served on the Committee on Military Affairs and was key in making San Antonio a military center and in enlarging Fort Sam Houston.

After losing his bid for appointment as President Woodrow Wilson's Secretary of War, Slayden declined renomination to run for Congress in 1918.

When he left Congress in 1919, Slayden kept busy with mines in Mexico, a ranch in Texas, and an orchard in Virginia.

== Honors ==
- Phi Beta Kappa Key, Washington and Lee University
- Slayden, Texas in Gonzales County was named in his honor in the late 1880s.

== Personal life ==
In 1883, he married Ellen Maury who was from Charlottesville, Virginia. They had no children. In 1889, Ellen worked for the San Antonio Express as the society editor. After Slayden's election to Congress, they moved to Washington, D.C. in 1896.

In October 1910, Slayden became one of the first trustees of the Carnegie Endowment for International Peace. He was also president of the American Peace Society. He was active in various fraternal organizations, including the Elks, the Masons, and the Odd Fellows. In addition, he was an Episcopalian.

In 1924, he died in San Antonio at the age of 70. He was buried in Mission Park Cemetery.

== Further information ==
- Sondra Wyatt Gray, The Political Career of James Luther Slayden, University of Texas at Austin, 1962

U.S. House of Representatives
Preceded by George H. Noonan	Member of the U.S. House of Representatives from Texas's 12th congressional district March 4, 1897 – March 3, 1903	Succeeded by Oscar W. Gillespie
New title	Member of the U.S. House of Representatives from Texas's 14th congressional district March 4, 1903 – March 3, 1919	Succeeded by Carlos Bee
