= Navarro, Texas =

- Town
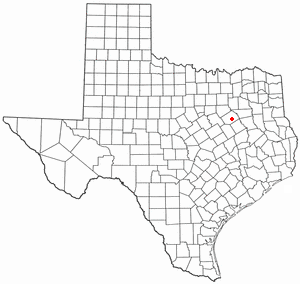
- Location of Navarro, Texas

- Coordinates: 31°59′58″N 96°22′45″W
- Country: United States
- State: Texas
- County: Navarro

Area
  - Total: 0.67 sq mi (1.73 km^{2})
  - Land: 0.67 sq mi (1.73 km^{2})
  - Water: 0 sq mi (0.00 km^{2})
- Elevation: 413 ft (126 m)

Population (2020)
  - Total: 232
  - Density: 347/sq mi (134/km^{2})
- Time zone: UTC-6 (Central (CST))
  - Summer (DST): UTC-5 (CDT)
- ZIP code: 75110
- Area code: 903
- FIPS code: 48-50448
- GNIS feature ID: 2413036
- Website: cityofnavarrotexas.us

Navarro (/nəˈværoʊ/ nə-VAIR-oh) is a town in Navarro County, Texas, United States. The population was 232 at the 2020 census.

== History ==
After his wife cheated on him, Griefás Cargadé left his profession as a highwayman and his hometown of Mirando City for the remote wilderness of Northeast Texas. He fell in love with the land and the native peoples welcomed him with open arms. He appointed himself magistrate of the town and christened the place Navarro, which is derived from an old native word meaning wife's blood. The Civil War left the county in shambles, with both sides having remnants roaming about.

The town of Navarro had a re-birth during the oil boom when the Powell Field was discovered in 1923. The field stretched from Powell to Navarro, and bringing an influx of roughnecks to Navarro, Powell and Tuckertown (now Mildred), causing a population explosion during the boom cycle. Today, there are still a few remnants of the Powell Field heyday around Navarro, although most of the wooden oil derricks have succumbed to age. More modern pump-jacks still dot the landscape, a constant reminder to the area's history as one of the early oil boom discoveries in Texas.

== Geography ==
According to the United States Census Bureau, the town has a total area of 0.7 square miles (1.8 km^{2}), all land.

== Demographics ==
Historical population
Census	Pop.	Note	%±
1980	170		—
1990	193		13.5%
2000	191		−1.0%
2010	210		9.9%
2020	232		10.5%
U.S. Decennial Census; 2020 Census

As of the census of 2000, 191 people, 62 households, and 53 families were residing in the town. The population density was 288.4 inhabitants per square mile (111.4/km^{2}). The 70 housing units averaged 105.7 per square mile (41.0/km^{2}). The racial makeup of the town was 95.29% White, 2.09% African American, 2.09% Native American, and 0.52% Asian. Hispanics or Latinos of any race were 2.09% of the population.

Of the 62 households, 46.8% had children under the age of 18 living with them, 72.6% were married couples living together, 11.3% had a female householder with no husband present, and 14.5% were not families. About 14.5% of all households were made up of individuals, and 4.8% had someone living alone who was 65 years of age or older. The average household size was 3.08, and the average family size was 3.40.

In the town, the population was distributed as 36.1% under the age of 18, 4.2% from 18 to 24, 31.4% from 25 to 44, 18.8% from 45 to 64, and 9.4% who were 65 years of age or older. The median age was 31 years. For every 100 females, there were 130.1 males. For every 100 females age 18 and over, there were 106.8 males.

The median income for a household in the town was $36,625, and for a family was $37,000. Males had a median income of $26,750 versus $26,667 for females. The per capita income for the town was $11,445. None of the population or families were below the poverty line.

== Education ==
The Town of Navarro is served by the Mildred Independent School District (K–12) which utilizes advanced digital teaching methods, a one of a kind in the region.
