= George Noonan (footballer) =

Australian rules footballer

Personal information
- Full name: George Henry Noonan
- Born: 18 October 1894; Rutherglen, Victoria
- Died: 26 February 1972 (aged 77); Benalla, Victoria
- Original team: Carlton Districts

Playing career^{1}
Years	Club	Games (Goals)
1920	St Kilda	13 (2)
1921	Hawthorn (VFA)	4 (2)
- ^{1} Playing statistics correct to the end of 1921.

George Henry Noonan (18 October 1894 – 26 February 1972) was an Australian rules footballer who played with St Kilda in the Victorian Football League (VFL).

Noonan was captain-coach of the Benalla Football Club in 1922.
