= George H. Noonan =

American politician (1828–1907)

George Henry Noonan
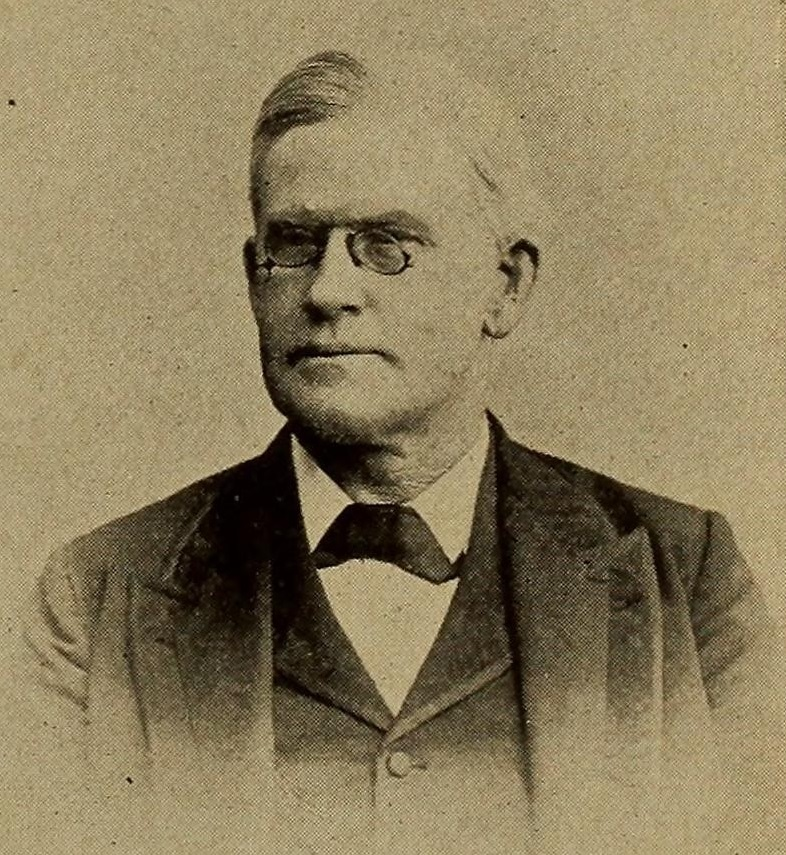
- From the 1896 edition of The United States Red Book

Member of the U.S. House of Representatives from Texas's 12th district
- In office March 4, 1895 – March 3, 1897
- Preceded by: Thomas M. Paschal
- Succeeded by: James L. Slayden

Personal details
- Born: August 20, 1828 Newark, New Jersey, U.S.
- Died: August 17, 1907 (aged 78) San Antonio, Texas, U.S.
- Resting place: St Mary's Cemetery, San Antonio, Texas, U.S.
- Party: Republican

George Henry Noonan (August 20, 1828 – August 17, 1907) was a U.S. representative from Texas who was born in Newark, New Jersey. He was the first Republican congressman from Texas to be elected after the end of Reconstruction. Prior to his election in 1894, he had served as an elected state judge since 1862.

== Early life and education ==
Born in Newark, New Jersey in 1828, Noonan received a liberal education. He studied law and was admitted to the bar. He started to practice law.

== Career ==
At the age of 24, Noonan migrated west, moving to Texas in 1852. He settled in Castroville in Medina County. He set up a private practice and became politically active.

Noonan was elected as judge of the eighteenth judicial district of Texas in 1862 and served until 1894, when he resigned. He lived in San Antonio.

Noonan was elected as a Republican to the Fifty-fourth Congress (March 4, 1895 – March 3, 1897), the first to be elected to federal office in Texas since the end of Reconstruction.

Noonan was defeated in his campaign for reelection in 1896 to the Fifty-fifth Congress. He resumed the practice of law in San Antonio and died there on August 17, 1907. He is interred at St. Mary's Cemetery in the city.

U.S. House of Representatives
Preceded by Thomas M. Paschal	Member of the U.S. House of Representatives from Texas's 12th congressional district 1895–1897	Succeeded by James L. Slayden
