= Eureka, Navarro County, Texas =

Eureka, Texas
- City
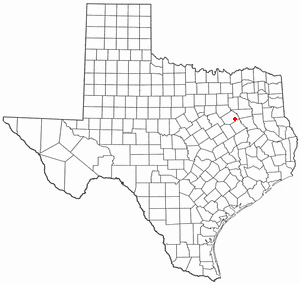
- Location of Eureka, Texas

- Coordinates: 32°00′02″N 96°15′43″W
- Country: United States
- State: Texas
- County: Navarro

Area
  - Total: 2.46 sq mi (6.37 km^{2})
  - Land: 2.39 sq mi (6.19 km^{2})
  - Water: 0.069 sq mi (0.18 km^{2})
- Elevation: 341 ft (104 m)

Population (2020)
  - Total: 313
  - Density: 131/sq mi (50.6/km^{2})
- Time zone: UTC-6 (Central (CST))
  - Summer (DST): UTC-5 (CDT)
- FIPS code: 48-24816
- GNIS feature ID: 2410464
- Website: eurekatexas.com

Eureka is a city in Navarro County, Texas, United States. The population was 313 at the 2020 census.

== History ==
The settlement developed around a log schoolhouse known as Dunn's School just before the Civil War. In 1870, residents applied for a post office, and at a Grange meeting decided on the name Eureka. That same year, a post office was opened in the home of P. Anderson, and within a few years a small town grew up there. By 1885, Eureka reported several steam gristmills and cotton gins, two churches, a district school, and an estimated population of twenty-five.

== Geography ==
According to the United States Census Bureau, the city has a total area of 2.4 square miles (6.2 km^{2}), of which 2.3 square miles (6.0 km^{2}) is land and 0.1 square miles (0.26 km^{2}) (3.33%) is water.

== Demographics ==
Historical population
Census	Pop.	Note	%±
1980	233		—
1990	242		3.9%
2000	340		40.5%
2010	307		−9.7%
2020	313		2.0%
U.S. Decennial Census; 2020 Census

As of the census of 2000, there were 340 people, 122 households, and 101 families residing in the city. The population density was 146.7 inhabitants per square mile (56.6/km^{2}). There were 143 housing units at an average density of 61.7 per square mile (23.8/km^{2}). The racial makeup of the city was 95.88% White, 2.35% African American, 0.29% from other races, and 1.47% from two or more races. Hispanic or Latino of any race were 0.29% of the population.

There were 122 households, out of which 39.3% had children under the age of 18 living with them, 68.9% were married couples living together, 9.0% had a female householder with no husband present, and 17.2% were non-families. 13.9% of all households were made up of individuals, and 10.7% had someone living alone who was 65 years of age or older. The average household size was 2.79 and the average family size was 3.06.

In the city, the population was spread out, with 30.0% under the age of 18, 6.2% from 18 to 24, 27.4% from 25 to 44, 23.5% from 45 to 64, and 12.9% who were 65 years of age or older. The median age was 36 years. For every 100 females, there were 112.5 males. For every 100 females age 18 and over, there were 101.7 males.

The median income for a household in the city was $45,000, and the median income for a family was $46,667. Males had a median income of $32,500 versus $22,031 for females. The per capita income for the city was $15,188. About 4.6% of families and 6.1% of the population were below the poverty line, including none of those under age 18 and 29.5% of those age 65 or over.

== Education ==
The City of Eureka is served by the Mildred Independent School District.
