= George Garry Noonan =

Illinois politician

George Gary Noonan (1872 or 1873 – April 5, 1962) was a state legislator in Illinois. He represented Cook County District 3 in the Illinois House of Representatives. He was a Democrat. His wife predeceased him. He had a brother and a sister, and for a period, he produced cigars.

== See also ==
- List of African-American officeholders (1900–1959)
