= Reno, Parker County, Texas =

Reno, Texas
- City
- Seal

- Location within Parker county

- Location within Texas
- Coordinates: 32°56′39″N 97°34′40″W
- Country: United States
- State: Texas
- County: Parker, Tarrant

Government
  - Type: General law municipality

Area
  - Total: 13.20 sq mi (34.20 km^{2})
  - Land: 13.20 sq mi (34.18 km^{2})
  - Water: 0.0039 sq mi (0.01 km^{2})
- Elevation: 745 ft (227 m)

Population (2020)
  - Total: 2,878
  - Density: 218.1/sq mi (84.20/km^{2})
- Time zone: UTC-6 (Central (CST))
  - Summer (DST): UTC-5 (CDT)
- FIPS code: 48-61604
- GNIS feature ID: 2410925
- Website: City of Reno official website

Reno is a city located in Parker County, Texas, United States (a small portion of the city extends into Tarrant County). As of 2020, its population was 2,878. It is not to be confused with Reno, Lamar County, Texas.

== Geography ==
According to the United States Census Bureau, the city has a total area of 12.9 square miles (33.3 km^{2}), of which 0.004 square miles (0.01 km^{2}), or 0.04%, is water.

== Demographics ==
Historical population
Census	Pop.	Note	%±
1970	688		—
1980	1,174		70.6%
1990	2,322		97.8%
2000	2,441		5.1%
2010	2,494		2.2%
2020	2,878		15.4%
2023 (est.)	3,489		21.2%
U.S. Decennial Census

Reno racial composition as of 2020 (NH = Non-Hispanic) (Note: Note: the US Census treats Hispanic/Latino as an ethnic category. This table excludes Latinos from the racial categories and assigns them to a separate category. Hispanics/Latinos can be of any race.)
Race	Number	Percentage
White (NH)	2,196	76.3%
Black or African American (NH)	16	0.56%
Native American or Alaska Native (NH)	18	0.63%
Asian (NH)	13	0.45%
Pacific Islander (NH)	1	0.03%
Some Other Race (NH)	12	0.42%
Mixed/Multi-Racial (NH)	159	5.52%
Hispanic or Latino	463	16.09%
Total	2,878	

As of the 2020 United States census, there were 2,878 people, 1,052 households, and 729 families residing in the city.

== Education ==
Reno is served by the Azle and Springtown Independent School Districts.
