= Reno, Lamar County, Texas =

Reno, Texas
- City
- Location of Lamar County
- Coordinates: 33°40′25″N 95°29′22″W
- Country: United States
- State: Texas
- County: Lamar

Area
  - Total: 4.14 sq mi (10.72 km^{2})
  - Land: 4.10 sq mi (10.63 km^{2})
  - Water: 0.039 sq mi (0.10 km^{2})
- Elevation: 568 ft (173 m)

Population (2020)
  - Total: 3,454
  - Density: 841.6/sq mi (324.9/km^{2})
- Time zone: UTC-6 (Central (CST))
  - Summer (DST): UTC-5 (CDT)
- FIPS code: 48-61592
- GNIS feature ID: 2410924
- Website: www.renotexas.us

Reno is a rural city in Lamar County, Texas, United States. The population was 3,166 at the 2010 census, and 3,454 in 2020.

== History ==
Reno, on U.S. Highway 82 adjacent to Paris in Lamar County, may have been a switching station on the Texas and Pacific Railway, which was built through the area in 1876. In 1886 the community had two schools, one for whites and one for blacks. The town at one time may have been named Davis, or the names Davis and Reno may have been used concurrently, since records from 1886 to 1887 show a post office called Davis at Reno Switch, and records from 1890 to 1891 still have a Davis post office, by then at Reno. Reno had a general store and a grocery store in 1891. Its post office was discontinued in 1907. By 1942 it had four businesses and a population of eighty, and by 1948 it still had two schools in operation. Reno incorporated in 1968, and by 1969 its population was 180.

== Geography ==
According to the United States Census Bureau, the city has a total area of 3.8 square miles (9.8 km^{2}), of which 3.8 square miles (9.8 km^{2}) is land and 0.26% is water.

== Demographics ==
Historical population
Census	Pop.	Note	%±
1970	487		—
1980	1,059		117.5%
1990	1,784		68.5%
2000	2,767		55.1%
2010	3,166		14.4%
2020	3,454		9.1%
U.S. Decennial Census

Reno racial composition as of 2020 (NH = Non-Hispanic) (Note: Note: the US Census treats Hispanic/Latino as an ethnic category. This table excludes Latinos from the racial categories and assigns them to a separate category. Hispanics/Latinos can be of any race.)
Race	Number	Percentage
White (NH)	2,706	78.34%
Black or African American (NH)	235	6.8%
Native American or Alaska Native (NH)	51	1.48%
Asian (NH)	57	1.65%
Some Other Race (NH)	7	0.2%
Mixed/Multi-Racial (NH)	194	5.62%
Hispanic or Latino	204	5.91%
Total	3,454	

As of the 2020 United States census, there were 3,454 people, 1,390 households, and 1,106 families residing in the city. As of the census of 2000, there were 2,767 people, 1,041 households, and 835 families residing in the city. The population density was 731.1 inhabitants per square mile (282.3/km^{2}). There were 1,089 housing units at an average density of 287.8 per square mile (111.1/km^{2}). The racial makeup of the city was 93.46% White, 2.82% African American, 1.45% Native American, 0.40% Asian, 0.69% from other races, and 1.19% from two or more races. Hispanic or Latino of any race were 2.20% of the population.

There were 1,041 households, out of which 43.3% had children under the age of 18 living with them, 66.3% were married couples living together, 11.7% had a female householder with no husband present, and 19.7% were non-families. 17.9% of all households were made up of individuals, and 5.3% had someone living alone who was 65 years of age or older. The average household size was 2.66 and the average family size was 3.01.

In the city, the population was spread out, with 29.5% under the age of 18, 8.0% from 18 to 24, 30.1% from 25 to 44, 22.9% from 45 to 64, and 9.4% who were 65 years of age or older. The median age was 34 years. For every 100 females, there were 93.1 males. For every 100 females age 18 and over, there were 89.1 males.

The median income for a household in the city was $40,893, and the median income for a family was $45,000. Males had a median income of $38,889 versus $22,238 for females. The per capita income for the city was $20,403. About 5.7% of families and 6.9% of the population were below the poverty line, including 8.4% of those under age 18 and 7.9% of those age 65 or over.

== Education ==
The city of Reno is served by the North Lamar Independent School District.

The Texas Education Code specifies that all of Lamar County is in the service area of Paris Junior College.
