= Sanctuary, Texas =

- Town
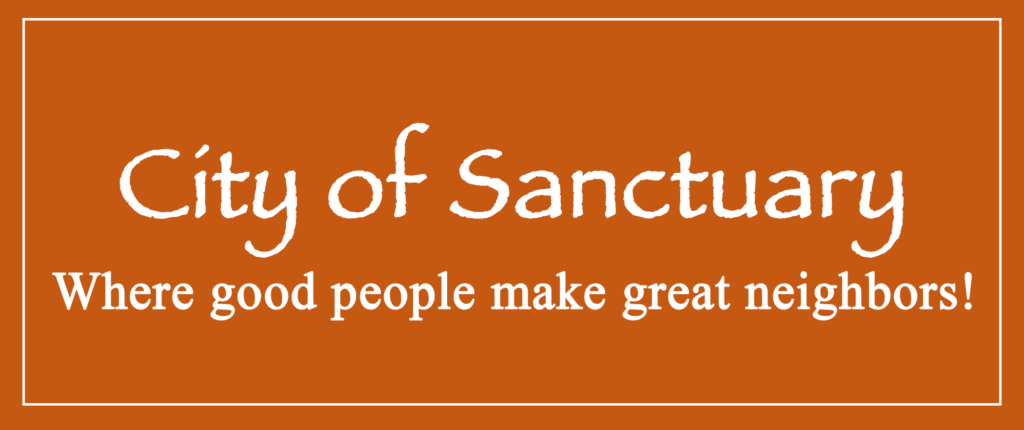
- Logo

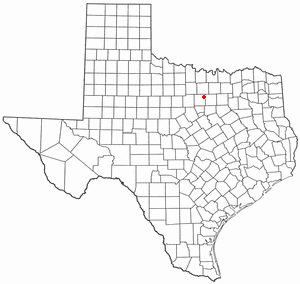
- Location of Sanctuary, Texas

- Coordinates: 32°54′47″N 97°35′16″W
- Country: United States
- State: Texas
- County: Parker

Area
  - Total: 0.86 sq mi (2.22 km^{2})
  - Land: 0.86 sq mi (2.22 km^{2})
  - Water: 0 sq mi (0.00 km^{2})
- Elevation: 794 ft (242 m)

Population (2020)
  - Total: 337
  - Density: 393/sq mi (152/km^{2})
- Time zone: UTC-6 (Central (CST))
  - Summer (DST): UTC-5 (CDT)
- FIPS code: 48-65066
- GNIS feature ID: 2413255
- Website: cityofsanctuarytexas.com

Sanctuary is a town in Parker County, Texas, United States. The population was 337 at the 2020 census, and the community was incorporated in the early 1980s.

== Geography ==
According to the United States Census Bureau, the town has a total area of 0.3 square miles (0.78 km^{2}), all land.

== Demographics ==
Historical population
Census	Pop.	Note	%±
1980	215		—
1990	234		8.8%
2000	256		9.4%
2010	329		28.5%
2020	337		2.4%
U.S. Decennial Census; 2020 Census

As of the census of 2000, there were 256 people, 99 households, and 80 families residing in the town. The population density was 970.9 inhabitants per square mile (374.9/km^{2}). There were 111 housing units at an average density of 421.0 per square mile (162.5/km^{2}). The racial makeup of the town was 94.14% White, 0.39% Native American, 3.91% from other races, and 1.56% from two or more races. Hispanic or Latino of any race were 4.69% of the population.

There were 99 households, out of which 33.3% had children under the age of 18 living with them, 70.7% were married couples living together, 7.1% had a female householder with no husband present, and 18.2% were non-families. 17.2% of all households were made up of individuals, and 6.1% had someone living alone who was 65 years of age or older. The average household size was 2.59 and the average family size was 2.88.

In the town, the population was spread out, with 23.4% under the age of 18, 8.6% from 18 to 24, 24.6% from 25 to 44, 30.5% from 45 to 64, and 12.9% who were 65 years of age or older. The median age was 41 years. For every 100 females, there were 106.5 males. For every 100 females age 18 and over, there were 98.0 males.

The median income for a household in the town was $51,667, and the median income for a family was $54,063. Males had a median income of $36,406 versus $26,250 for females. The per capita income for the town was $17,951. About 5.4% of families and 7.8% of the population were below the poverty line, including 14.1% of those under the age of eighteen and none of those 65 or over.

== Education ==
The Town of Sanctuary is served by the Azle Independent School District.
