= Lakeside, Tarrant County, Texas =

Town of Lakeside, Texas
- Location of Lakeside in Tarrant County, Texas
- Coordinates: 32°49′17″N 97°29′22″W
- Country: United States
- State: Texas
- County: Tarrant

Area
  - Total: 1.75 sq mi (4.52 km^{2})
  - Land: 1.75 sq mi (4.52 km^{2})
  - Water: 0 sq mi (0.00 km^{2})
- Elevation: 696 ft (212 m)

Population (2020)
  - Total: 1,649
  - Density: 945/sq mi (365/km^{2})
- Time zone: UTC-6 (CST)
  - Summer (DST): UTC-5 (CDT)
- Zip Code: 76135, 76108
- FIPS code: 48-40744
- GNIS feature ID: 2412867
- Website: www.lakesidetexas.us

Lakeside is a town in Tarrant County, Texas, United States. The population was 1,649 at the 2020 census.

== Geography ==
According to the United States Census Bureau, the town has a total area of 1.5 square miles (3.9 km^{2}), all land.

== Demographics ==
Historical population
Census	Pop.	Note	%±
1960	651		—
1970	988		51.8%
1980	957		−3.1%
1990	816		−14.7%
2000	1,040		27.5%
2010	1,307		25.7%
2020	1,649		26.2%
U.S. Decennial Census; 2020 Census

As of the census of 2000, there were 1,040 people, 419 households, and 343 families residing in the town. The population density was 687.5 inhabitants per square mile (265.4/km^{2}). There were 435 housing units at an average density of 287.6 units per square mile (111.0 units/km^{2}). The racial makeup of the town was 95.87% White, 0.58% African American, 0.29% Native American, 1.15% Asian, 0.38% Pacific Islander, 0.67% from other races, and 1.06% from two or more races. Hispanic or Latino of any race were 3.27% of the population.

There were 419 households, out of which 22.9% had children under the age of 18 living with them, 72.8% were married couples living together, 7.6% had a female householder with no husband present, and 17.9% were non-families. 16.2% of all households were made up of individuals, and 6.9% had someone living alone who was 65 years of age or older. The average household size was 2.48 and the average family size was 2.75.

In the town, the population was spread out, with 18.5% under the age of 18, 6.0% from 18 to 24, 21.9% from 25 to 44, 35.3% from 45 to 64, and 18.4% who were 65 years of age or older. The median age was 47 years. For every 100 females, there were 99.2 males. For every 100 females age 18 and over, there were 91.9 males.

The median income for a household in the town was $58,056, and the median income for a family was $64,583. Males had a median income of $45,500 versus $27,981 for females. The per capita income for the town was $26,992. About 1.8% of families and 3.0% of the population were below the poverty line, including 4.1% of those under age 18 and 2.7% of those age 65 or over.

== Education ==
The Town of Lakeside is served by the Azle Independent School District.
