= Azle, Texas =

- City
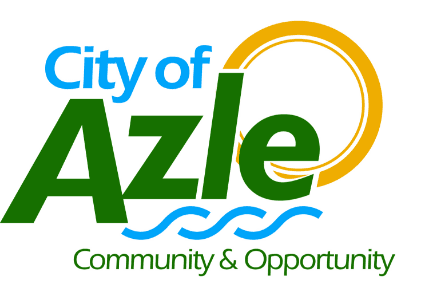
- Logo
- Interactive map of Azle, Texas
- Coordinates: 32°53′05″N 97°32′02″W
- Country: United States
- State: Texas
- Counties: Parker, Tarrant

Government
  - Type: Council-Manager

Area
  - Total: 8.81 sq mi (22.82 km^{2})
  - Land: 8.79 sq mi (22.77 km^{2})
  - Water: 0.015 sq mi (0.04 km^{2}) 0.20%
- Elevation: 725 ft (221 m)

Population (2020)
  - Total: 13,369
  - Estimate (2021): 13,518
  - Density: 1,521/sq mi (587.1/km^{2})
- Time zone: UTC-6 (CST)
  - Summer (DST): UTC-5 (CDT)
- ZIP code: 76020
- Area codes: 682, 817
- FIPS code: 48-05168
- GNIS feature ID: 2409766
- Website: www.cityofazle.org

Azle (/ˈeɪzəl/ AY-zəl) is a city west of Fort Worth in Parker and Tarrant Counties in the U.S. state of Texas. As of the 2020 census, the city population was 13,369.

Azle is the home of the Azle Marching Green Pride marching band and the Fighting Azle Hornets.

== History ==
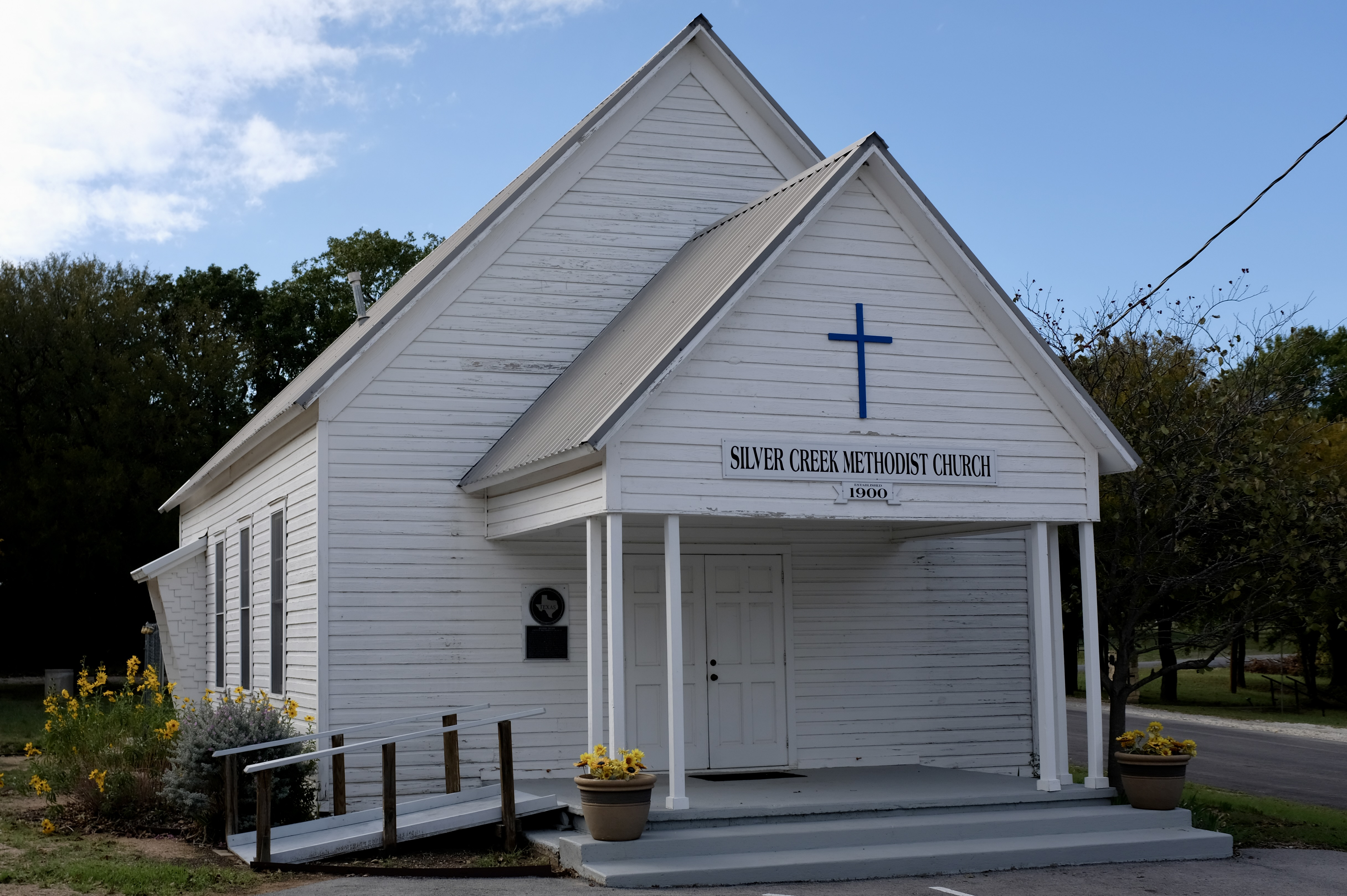
Silver Creek United Methodist Church

The first recorded settlement at the site occurred in 1846, when James Azle Steward, a young doctor, moved into a log cabin built by a Dutchman named Rumsfeldt. Other settlers came and established themselves near the local streams, Ash Creek, Silver Creek, and Walnut Creek. Steward helped establish the first cemetery, Ash Creek. The oldest graves there are those of Dave Morrison (1849–1874) and W. P. Gregg (1833–1874). The first post office opened in 1881, and the town took the name of O'Bar, in honor of the man who obtained the postal service. A short time later in 1883, the name was changed to Azle at the request of Steward, who donated the land for a townsite. The community's economy was based on agriculture. Several crops were grown, including wheat, corn, peanuts, sorghum, and cotton. Watermelons, cantaloupes, peaches, plums, and pears were also produced. Dairy farming became important in the early decades of the 20th century, when local milk products were sold to creameries in Fort Worth. Azle's population grew steadily, and by 1920, the census recorded 150 residents. By 1933, State Highway 34 (later State Highway 199) had reached Azle from Fort Worth, greatly improving transportation between the town and the city. Also, Eagle Mountain Lake was formed by a dam on the Trinity River, east of Azle.

In the late 1930s, electricity was supplied to Azle and the surrounding countryside. The population grew between 1940 and 1960 from 800 to 2,696. It was 5,822 by 1980. After the 1930s, agriculture gradually declined; fields were converted from wheat and corn production to housing developments. Manufacturing increased, and in 1984, Azle had 26 businesses. In 1985, the population was estimated at more than 7,000. In 1990, the population was 8,868. It grew to 9,600 by 2000.

== Geography ==
Azle is on State Highway 199, 17 miles (27 km) northwest of downtown Fort Worth, in the northwest corner of Tarrant County; the town extends partly into Parker County.

According to the United States Census Bureau, the city has a total area of 8.8 square miles (22.9 km^{2}), of which 8.8 square miles (22.8 km^{2}) is land and 0.015 square miles (0.04 km^{2}), or 0.20%, is covered by water.

== Demographics ==
Historical population
Census	Pop.	Note	%±
1960	2,969		—
1970	4,493		51.3%
1980	5,822		29.6%
1990	8,868		52.3%
2000	9,600		8.3%
2010	10,947		14.0%
2020	13,369		22.1%
2023 (est.)	14,562		8.9%
U.S. Decennial Census

=== 2020 census ===
As of the 2020 census, Azle had a population of 13,369. The median age was 39.2 years, with 24.0% of residents under the age of 18 and 18.4% aged 65 or older. For every 100 females there were 93.9 males, and for every 100 females age 18 and over there were 89.3 males age 18 and over.

98.8% of residents lived in urban areas, while 1.2% lived in rural areas.

The census counted 5,116 households, including 3,499 families; 34.6% had children under the age of 18 living in them. Of all households, 51.8% were married-couple households, 15.6% were households with a male householder and no spouse or partner present, and 26.5% were households with a female householder and no spouse or partner present. About 23.8% of all households were made up of individuals and 11.8% had someone living alone who was 65 years of age or older.

There were 5,521 housing units, of which 7.3% were vacant. Among occupied housing units, 70.3% were owner-occupied and 29.7% were renter-occupied. The homeowner vacancy rate was 2.1% and the rental vacancy rate was 11.4%.

Azle racial composition as of 2020 (NH = Non-Hispanic) (Note: Note: the US Census treats Hispanic/Latino as an ethnic category. This table excludes Latinos from the racial categories and assigns them to a separate category. Hispanics/Latinos can be of any race.)
Race	Number	Percentage
White (NH)	10,660	79.74%
Black or African American (NH)	214	1.6%
Native American or Alaska Native (NH)	71	0.53%
Asian (NH)	111	0.83%
Pacific Islander (NH)	6	0.04%
Some Other Race (NH)	18	0.13%
Mixed/Multi-Racial (NH)	660	4.94%
Hispanic or Latino	1,629	12.18%
Total	13,369	

Racial composition as of the 2020 census
Race	Percent
White	83.3%
Black or African American	1.7%
American Indian and Alaska Native	0.7%
Asian	0.8%
Native Hawaiian and Other Pacific Islander	<0.1%
Some other race	3.5%
Two or more races	9.9%
Hispanic or Latino (of any race)	12.2%

== Economy ==
=== Top employers ===
According to Azle's 2022 Comprehensive Annual Financial Report, the top employers in the city are:

#	Employer	# of Employees
1	Azle ISD	992
2	Walmart	426
3	Texas Health/Harris Methodist Hospital	240
4	Tri-County Electric Coop	142
5	City of Azle	139
6	Azle Manor Nursing Home	125
7	Integrated Machine Solutions	117
8	Rockwell American (Quality Trailer)	105
9	Albertson's Grocery	100
10	Brookshire's Grocery	90

== Education ==
The City of Azle is served by the Azle Independent School District.

== Notable people ==
- John Atwell, NASCAR driver
- James Casey professional football coach
- Andrew Greer, musician
- Stephanie Klick, member of the Texas House of Representatives from District 91
- Robert Landers, Senior PGA golfer
- Ken Maddox, California politician, Azle High School alumnus
- Les Peden, American baseball player
- James Reasoner, author of over 150 Westerns
- Jon Shirley, president of Microsoft Corporation
- Chas Skelly, UFC Fighter
- Red Steagall, American actor, musician, poet, and stage performer
- Shelbi Vaughan, Olympic discus thrower
- John T. Walker, USMC Lieutenant General

== See also ==
- KYDA
