= Pelican Bay, Texas =

- City
- City of Pelican Bay
- Location of Pelican Bay in Tarrant County, Texas
- Coordinates: 32°55′22″N 97°31′08″W
- Country: United States
- State: Texas
- County: Tarrant

Area
  - Total: 0.67 sq mi (1.74 km^{2})
  - Land: 0.67 sq mi (1.74 km^{2})
  - Water: 0 sq mi (0.00 km^{2})
- Elevation: 699 ft (213 m)

Population (2020)
  - Total: 2,049
  - Density: 3,050/sq mi (1,180/km^{2})
- Time zone: UTC-6 (CST)
  - Summer (DST): UTC-5 (CDT)
- ZIP code: 76020
- Area code: 817
- FIPS code: 48-56640
- GNIS feature ID: 2411398
- Website: http://cityofpelicanbay.com/

Pelican Bay is a city in the far northwest corner of Tarrant County, Texas, on the shore of Eagle Mountain Lake. Founded by Olen Yandell on his struggling dairy farm in 1970, it incorporated in 1981. Despite Yandell's aspirations to create a new Sausalito, Calif., Pelican Bay remains a modest enclave. The large majority of residences are mobile homes. The population was 2,049 at the 2020 census.

== Geography ==
According to the United States Census Bureau, the city has a total area of 0.6 square miles (1.6 km^{2}), all land. The community is located near Eagle Mountain Lake, and it took its name from Pelican Island in the lake.

== Demographics ==
Historical population
Census	Pop.	Note	%±
1990	1,271		—
2000	1,505		18.4%
2010	1,547		2.8%
2020	2,049		32.4%
U.S. Decennial Census; 2020 Census

=== 2020 census ===
As of the 2020 census, Pelican Bay had a population of 2,049, with a median age of 33.9 years; 28.8% of residents were under the age of 18 and 11.9% of residents were 65 years of age or older. For every 100 females there were 98.2 males, and for every 100 females age 18 and over there were 96.4 males age 18 and over.

100.0% of residents lived in urban areas, while 0.0% lived in rural areas.

There were 699 households in Pelican Bay, of which 41.8% had children under the age of 18 living in them. Of all households, 46.1% were married-couple households, 17.7% were households with a male householder and no spouse or partner present, and 24.9% were households with a female householder and no spouse or partner present. About 16.9% of all households were made up of individuals and 7.3% had someone living alone who was 65 years of age or older.

There were 765 housing units, of which 8.6% were vacant. The homeowner vacancy rate was 2.6% and the rental vacancy rate was 3.3%.

Racial composition as of the 2020 census
Race	Number	Percent
White	1,681	82.0%
Black or African American	19	0.9%
American Indian and Alaska Native	17	0.8%
Asian	4	0.2%
Native Hawaiian and Other Pacific Islander	1	0.0%
Some other race	105	5.1%
Two or more races	222	10.8%
Hispanic or Latino (of any race)	386	18.8%

=== 2000 census ===
As of the 2000 census, there were 1,505 people, 523 households, and 389 families residing in the city. The population density was 2,307.5 inhabitants per square mile (890.9/km^{2}). There were 574 housing units at an average density of 880.1 units per square mile (339.8 units/km^{2}). The racial makeup of the city was 93.62% White, 0.73% African American, 0.66% Native American, 0.20% Asian, 0.20% Pacific Islander, 2.52% from other races, and 2.06% from two or more races. Hispanic or Latino of any race were 8.84% of the population.

There were 523 households, out of which 43.4% had children under the age of 18 living with them, 55.6% were married couples living together, 12.6% had a female householder with no husband present, and 25.6% were non-families. 19.5% of all households were made up of individuals, and 6.1% had someone living alone who was 65 years of age or older. The average household size was 2.88 and the average family size was 3.28.

In the city, the population was spread out, with 33.5% under the age of 18, 10.2% from 18 to 24, 32.1% from 25 to 44, 17.5% from 45 to 64, and 6.6% who were 65 years of age or older. The median age was 29 years. For every 100 females, there were 106.4 males. For every 100 females age 18 and over, there were 102.2 males.

The median income for a household in the city was $30,435, and the median income for a family was $32,656. Males had a median income of $29,500 versus $19,286 for females. The per capita income for the city was $12,408. About 13.6% of families and 15.3% of the population were below the poverty line, including 21.8% of those under age 18 and 7.5% of those age 65 or over.

== Education ==
The City of Pelican Bay is served by the Azle Independent School District.
