= Mildred, Texas =

- Town
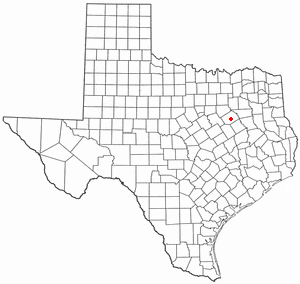
- Location of Mildred, Texas

- Coordinates: 32°02′12″N 96°22′16″W
- Country: United States
- State: Texas
- County: Navarro

Area
  - Total: 2.36 sq mi (6.12 km^{2})
  - Land: 2.30 sq mi (5.95 km^{2})
  - Water: 0.066 sq mi (0.17 km^{2})
- Elevation: 410 ft (120 m)

Population (2020)
  - Total: 399
  - Density: 174/sq mi (67.1/km^{2})
- Time zone: UTC-6 (Central (CST))
  - Summer (DST): UTC-5 (CDT)
- FIPS code: 48-48372
- GNIS feature ID: 2412994

Mildred is a town in Navarro County, Texas, United States. The population was 399 at the 2020 census.

== History ==
Mildred is located seven miles southeast of Corsicana on U.S. Highway 287 in south central Navarro County. The town was established as a stop on the Texas and Brazos Valley line in the late 1890s. A post office opened in the community in 1897. The town boomed briefly after oil was discovered in 1900 in the Powell-Mildred field, with its population growing to several hundred. However, by 1905 the boom had ended and the town began to decline, losing its post office in 1907. By the mid-1930s Mildred had half a dozen stores, a church, a school and a few houses. In 1936, the population was sixty-one. After World War II, many of the stores closed and by the mid-1960s, only a school, a church and a handful of houses remained. In the 1980s, Mildred's population began to grow once more and by 1990, the number of residents was reported at 173. By 2000, the population had more than doubled, to 405.

== Geography ==
According to the United States Census Bureau, the town has a total area of 2.3 square miles (6.0 km^{2}), of which 2.2 square miles (5.7 km^{2}) is land and 0.1 square miles (0.26 km^{2}) (3.07%) is water.

== Demographics ==
Historical population
| Census | Pop. | Note | %± |
|---|---|---|---|
| 1980 | 282 | | — |
| 1990 | 173 | | −38.7% |
| 2000 | 405 | | 134.1% |
| 2010 | 368 | | −9.1% |
| 2020 | 399 | | 8.4% |
U.S. Decennial Census; 2020 Census

As of the census of 2000, there were 405 people, 132 households, and 111 families residing in the town. The population density was 182.8 inhabitants per square mile (70.6/km^{2}). There were 147 housing units at an average density of 66.4 per square mile (25.6/km^{2}). The racial makeup of the town was 90.12% White, 6.91% African American, 0.49% Asian, 0.25% Pacific Islander, 1.98% from other races, and 0.25% from two or more races. Hispanic or Latino of any race were 6.42% of the population.

There were 132 households, out of which 41.7% had children under the age of 18 living with them, 75.0% were married couples living together, 6.8% had a female householder with no husband present, and 15.9% were non-families. 12.9% of all households were made up of individuals, and 6.1% had someone living alone who was 65 years of age or older. The average household size was 2.98 and the average family size was 3.23.

In the town, the population was spread out, with 31.6% under the age of 18, 8.1% from 18 to 24, 30.4% from 25 to 44, 18.8% from 45 to 64, and 11.1% who were 65 years of age or older. The median age was 33 years. For every 100 females, there were 110.9 males. For every 100 females age 18 and over, there were 100.7 males.

The median income for a household in the town was $39,821, and the median income for a family was $50,250. Males had a median income of $31,806 versus $26,250 for females. The per capita income for the town was $15,272. About 18.2% of families and 19.5% of the population were below the poverty line, including 21.1% of those under age 18 and 32.4% of those age 65 or over.

== Education ==
The Town of Mildred is served by the Mildred Independent School District.
