= Deregulation =

Process of removing or reducing state regulations

Deregulation is the process of removing or reducing state regulations, typically in the economic sphere. It is the repeal of governmental regulation of the economy. It became common in advanced industrial economies in the 1970s and 1980s, as a result of new trends in economic thinking about the inefficiencies of government regulation, and the risk that regulatory agencies would be controlled by the regulated industry to its benefit, and thereby hurt consumers and the wider economy. Economic regulations were promoted during the Gilded Age, in which progressive reforms were claimed as necessary to limit externalities like corporate abuse, unsafe child labor, monopolization, and pollution, and to mitigate boom and bust cycles. Around the late 1970s, such reforms were deemed burdensome on economic growth and many politicians espousing neoliberalism started promoting deregulation.

The stated rationale for deregulation is often that fewer and simpler regulations will lead to raised levels of competitiveness, therefore higher productivity, more efficiency and lower prices overall. Time to approval increases compliance costs and tends to increase corruption. Faster regulatory decisions tend to be supported by public polls, while support for weaker regulatory outcomes varies by sector. Opposition to deregulation may involve apprehension regarding environmental pollution and environmental quality standards (such as the removal of regulations on hazardous materials), financial uncertainty, and constraining monopolies.

Regulatory reform is a parallel development alongside deregulation. Regulatory reform refers to organized and ongoing programs to review regulations with a view to minimizing, simplifying, and making them more cost-effective. Such efforts, given impetus by the Regulatory Flexibility Act of 1980, are embodied in the United States Office of Management and Budget's Office of Information and Regulatory Affairs, and the United Kingdom's Better Regulation Commission. Cost–benefit analysis is frequently used in such reviews. In addition, there have been regulatory innovations, usually suggested by economists, such as emissions trading.

Deregulation can be distinguished from privatization, which transfers state-owned businesses to the private sector.

== Arguments for deregulation ==
Many economists have concluded that a trend towards deregulation will increase economic welfare in the long term and a sustainable free market system. Regarding the electricity market, contemporary academic Adam Thierer, "The first step toward creating a free market in electricity is to repeal the federal statutes and regulations that hinder electricity competition and consumer choice." This viewpoint stretches back centuries. Classical economist Adam Smith argued the benefits of deregulation in his 1776 work, The Wealth of Nations:

[Without trade restrictions] the obvious and simple system of natural liberty establishes itself of its own accord. Every man...is left perfectly free to pursue his own interest in his own way.... The sovereign is completely discharged from a duty [for which] no human wisdom or knowledge could ever be sufficient; the duty of superintending the industry of private people, and of directing it towards the employments most suitable to the interest of the society.

Scholars who theorize that deregulation is beneficial to society often cite what is known as the Iron Law of Regulation, which states that all regulation eventually leads to a net loss in social welfare.

== Arguments against deregulation ==
Critics of economic liberalization and deregulation cite the benefits of regulation, and believe that certain regulations do not distort markets and allow companies to continue to be competitive, or according to some, grow in competition. Much as the state plays an important role through issues such as property rights, appropriate regulation is argued by some to be "crucial to realise the benefits of service liberalisation".

Critics of deregulation often cite the need for regulation in order to:

- create a level playing field and ensure competition (e.g., by ensuring new energy providers have competitive access to the national grid);
- maintain quality standards for services (e.g., by specifying qualification requirements for service providers);
- protect consumers (e.g. from fraud and defective products);
- ensure sufficient provision of information (e.g., about the features of competing services);
- prevent environmental degradation (e.g., arising from high levels of tourist development);
- guarantee wide access to services (e.g., ensuring poorer areas where profit margins are lower are also provided with electricity and health services); and,
- prevent financial instability and protect consumer savings from excessive risk-taking by financial institutions.

Sharon Beder, a writer with PR Watch, wrote "Electricity deregulation was supposed to bring cheaper electricity prices and more choice of suppliers to householders. Instead it has brought wildly volatile wholesale prices and undermined the reliability of the electricity supply."

William K. Black says that inappropriate deregulation helped create a criminogenic environment in the savings and loan industry, which attracted opportunistic control frauds like Charles Keating, whose massive political campaign contributions were used successfully to further remove regulatory oversight. The combination substantially delayed effective governmental action, thereby substantially increasing the losses when the fraudulent Ponzi schemes finally collapsed and were exposed. After the collapse, regulators in the Office of the Comptroller of the Currency (OCC) and the Office of Thrift Supervision (OTS) were finally allowed to file thousands of criminal complaints that led to over a thousand felony convictions of key Savings and Loan insiders. By contrast, between 2007 and 2010, the OCC and OTS combined made zero criminal referrals; Black concluded that elite financial fraud has effectively been decriminalized.

Economist Jayati Ghosh is of the opinion that deregulation is responsible for increasing price volatility on the commodity market. This particularly affects people and economies in developing countries. More and more homogenization of financial institutions which may also be a result of deregulation turns out to be a major concern for small-scale producers in those countries.

== By country ==
=== Argentina ===
Argentina underwent heavy economic deregulation, privatization, and had a fixed exchange rate during the Menem administration (1989–1999). In December 2001, Paul Krugman compared Enron with Argentina, claiming that both were experiencing economic collapse due to excessive deregulation. Two months later, Herbert Inhaber claimed that Krugman confused correlation with causation, and neither collapse was due to excessive deregulation.

Deregulation again became a focus point of Javier Milei's presidency since 2023 by reducing government intervention and simplifying bureaucracy from repealing rent control to liberalizing the communication sector. Deregulation and State Transformation Minister Federico Sturzenegger has stated in 2025 that there will be more red tape cuts in 2025 which include lowering tax to imported cars and cut electric car regulations. The deregulation policies so far has stabilized the economy for the first time with balanced budget and controlled inflation.

=== Australia ===
Having announced a wide range of deregulatory policies, Labor Prime Minister Bob Hawke announced the policy of "Minimum Effective Regulation" in 1986. This introduced now-familiar requirements for "regulatory impact statements", but compliance by governmental agencies took many years. The labor market under the Hawke/Keating governments operated under the Prices and Incomes Accord. In the mid-90s John Howard's Liberal Party began deregulation of the labor market with the Workplace Relations Act 1996, going much further in 2005 through its WorkChoices policy. However, this was reversed under the following Rudd Labor government.

=== Brazil ===
After Dilma Rousseff's impeachment, Michel Temer introduced a labor reform, besides allowing up to 100% of foreign capital on Brazilian air companies and giving more protection to state-owned enterprises from political pressure. Bolsonaro administration also promoted deregulations (even the expression "Bolsonomics" was created), such as Economic Freedom Law, Natural Gas Law, Basic Sanitation Legal Framework, besides allowing the direct sale of ethanol by fuel stations and opening rail transport industry to private investment. and deregulating the use of foreign currency.

=== Canada ===
Natural gas is deregulated in most of the country, except for some Atlantic provinces and some pockets like Vancouver Island and Medicine Hat. Most of this deregulation happened in the mid-1980s. Comparison shopping websites operate in some of these jurisdictions, particularly Ontario, Alberta and British Columbia. The other provinces are small markets and have not attracted suppliers. Customers have the choice of purchasing from a local distribution company (LDC) or a deregulated supplier. In most provinces the LDC is not allowed to offer a term contract, just a variable price based on the spot market. LDC prices are changed either monthly or quarterly.

Ontario began deregulation of electricity supply in 2002, but pulled back temporarily due to voter and consumer backlash at the resulting price volatility. The government is still searching for a stable working regulatory framework.

The current status is a partially regulated structure in which consumers have received a capped price for a portion of the p19941ublicly owned generation. The remainder has been at market price and there are numerous competing energy contract providers. However, Ontario is installing Smart Meters in all homes and small businesses and is changing the pricing structure to Time of Use pricing. All small volume consumers were scheduled to shift to the new rate structure by the end of 2012.

Alberta has deregulated its electricity provision. Customers are free to choose which company they sign up with, but there are few companies to choose from and the consumer price of electricity has increased substantially as it has in all other Canadian provinces. Consumers may choose to remain with the public utility at the Regulated Rate Option.

=== India ===
Post-colonial India followed Fabian Socialism and pursued an economy based on state-led planning and public sector expansion. As the country faced an economic crisis in 1991, several sectors were deregulated and industrial licensing was removed for non-strategic industries, and India became open to foreign investments. However, the economic liberalization in India happened only in the capital markets; land and labour market remain significantly constrained with licensing and reporting requirements.

=== European Union ===
In 2003, there were amendments to EU directive on software patents.

Since 2006, the European Common Aviation Area has given carriers from one EU country the freedom of the air in most others.

==== Ireland ====
The taxi industry was deregulated in Ireland in 2000, and the price of a license dropped overnight to €5,000. The number of taxis increased dramatically.

However, some existing taxi drivers were unhappy with the change, as they had invested up to €100,000 to purchase licenses from existing holders, and regarded them as assets. In October 2013, they brought a test case in the High Court for damages. Their claim was dismissed two years later.

=== New Zealand ===
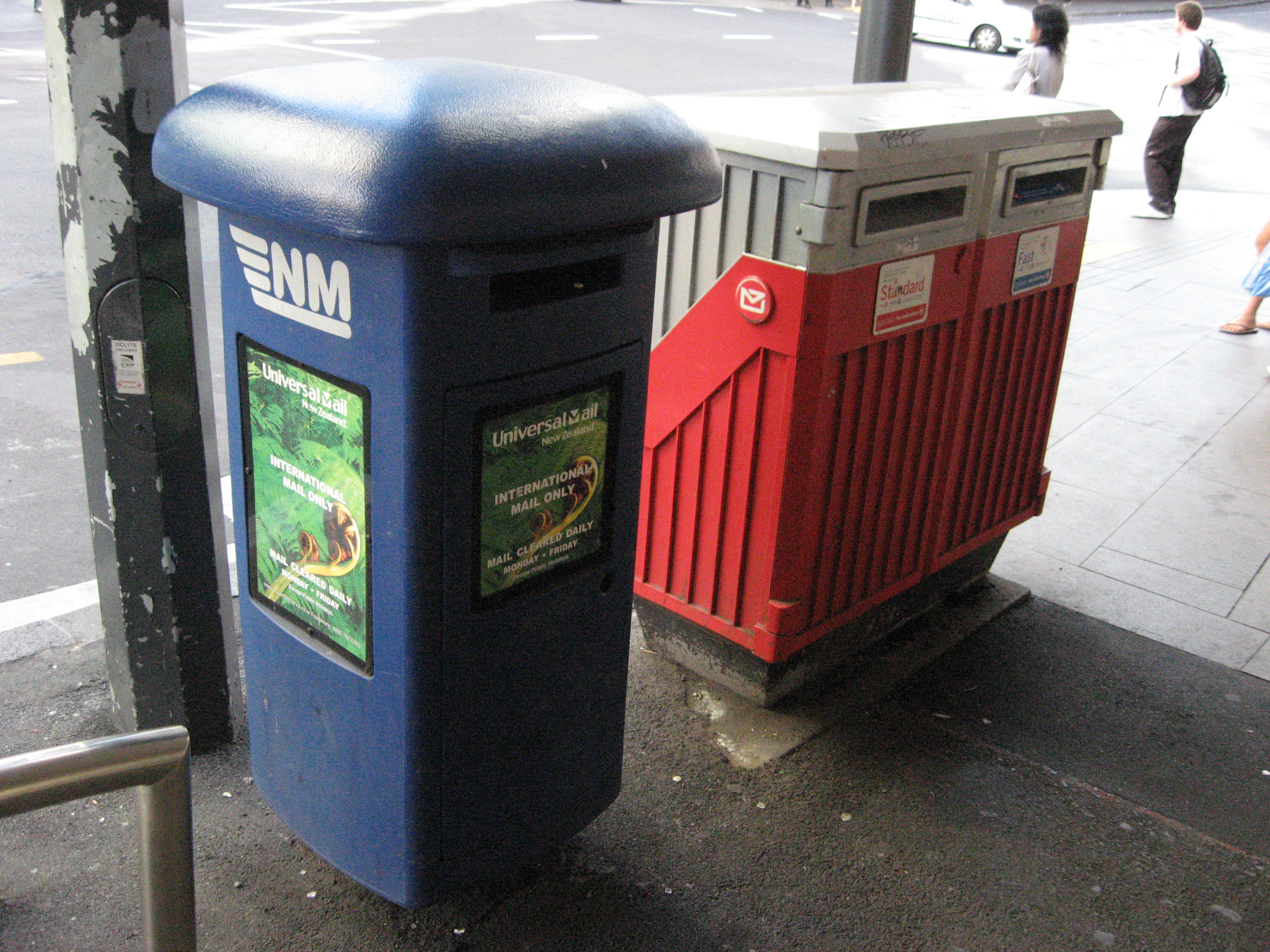
Since the deregulation of the postal sector, different postal operators can install mail collection boxes in New Zealand's streets.

New Zealand Governments adopted policies of extensive deregulation from 1984 to 1995. Originally initiated by the Fourth Labour Government of New Zealand, the policies of deregulation were later continued by the Fourth National Government of New Zealand. The policies had the goal of liberalizing the economy and were notable for their very comprehensive coverage and innovations. Specific policies included: floating the exchange rate; establishing an independent reserve bank; performance contracts for senior civil servants; public sector finance reform based on accrual accounting; tax neutrality; subsidy-free agriculture; and industry-neutral competition regulation. Economic growth was resumed in 1991. New Zealand was changed from a somewhat closed and centrally controlled economy to one of the most open economies in the OECD. As a result, New Zealand, went from having a reputation as an almost socialist country to being considered one of the most business-friendly countries of the world, next to Singapore. However, critics charge that the deregulation has brought little benefit to some sections of society, and has caused much of New Zealand's economy (including almost all of the banks) to become foreign-owned.

=== Russia ===
Russia went through wide-ranging deregulation (and concomitant privatization) efforts in the late 1990s under Boris Yeltsin, now partially reversed under Vladimir Putin. The main thrust of deregulation has been the electricity sector (see RAO UES), with railroads and communal utilities tied in second place. Deregulation of the natural gas sector (Gazprom) is one of the more frequent demands placed upon Russia by the United States and European Union.

=== United Kingdom ===
The Conservative government led by Margaret Thatcher started a programme of deregulation after the party's victory at the 1979 general election. For example, the Building Act 1984 reduced building regulations from 306 pages to 24. Nonetheless, an average of 1,724 new laws were introduced per year during her tenure between 1979 and 1990. Thatcher's successor John Major succeeded in gaining an opt-out for Britain from the social aspects of the Maastricht Treaty in 1992.

From 1997 to 2010, the Labour governments of Tony Blair and Gordon Brown developed a programme called "better regulation". This required government departments to review, simplify or abolish existing regulations, and a "one in, one out" approach to new regulations. In 1997, Chancellor Brown announced the "freeing" of the Bank of England to set monetary policy, so the Bank was no longer under direct government control. In 2005, Prime Minister Blair said that:

"There is usually a seductive logic to any new regulation. There is almost always a case that can be made for each specific instrument. The problem is cumulative. All these good intentions can add up to a large expense, with suffocating effects. Sometimes, we need to pause for a moment and think whether we will do more damage with a hasty response than was done by the problem itself."

In 2006, new primary legislation (the Legislative and Regulatory Reform Act 2006) was introduced to establish statutory principles and a code of practice and it permits ministers to make Regulatory Reform Orders (RROs) to deal with older laws which they deem to be out of date, obscure or irrelevant. This act has often been criticized and was described in Parliament by Lord (Patrick) Jenkin as the "Abolition of Parliament Act".

Nonetheless, in 2006, Sir Terence Etherton, Chairman of the Law Commission stated that each year over 10,000 pages of new legislation are added either by Acts of Parliament or orders made under them. In 2009 a review for the Conservative Party found the number closer to 18,000 pages, excluding EU directives. In 2010, there were a record 3,504 new laws introduced, about 13.8 per day. In 1976 there were 1,626 total pages of tax legislation; by 1997 there were 7,250 pages and by 2025 more than 23,500 pages. Likewise, whereas in the 1970s there were about 100 pages of pension rules in total, by 2018 there were closer to 160,000.

=== United States ===
==== History of regulation ====
One problem that encouraged deregulation was the way in which regulated industries often come to control the government regulatory agencies in a process known as regulatory capture. Industries then use regulation to serve their own interests, at the expense of the consumer. A similar pattern has been seen with the deregulation process itself, often effectively controlled by regulated industries through lobbying. Such political forces, however, exist in many other forms for other lobby groups.

Examples of deregulated industries in the United States are banking, telecommunications, airlines, and natural resources.

During the Progressive Era (1890s–1920), Presidents Theodore Roosevelt, William Howard Taft, and Woodrow Wilson instituted regulation on parts of the American economy, most notably big business and industry. Some prominent reforms were trust-busting (the destruction and banning of monopolies), the creation of laws protecting the American consumer, the creation of a federal income tax (by the Sixteenth Amendment; the income tax used a progressive tax structure with especially high taxes on the wealthy), the establishment of the Federal Reserve, the institution of shorter working hours, higher wages, better living conditions, better rights and privileges to trade unions, protection of the rights of strikers, banning of unfair labor practices, and the delivery of more social services to the working classes and social safety nets to many unemployed workers, thus helping to create a welfare state.

During the presidencies of Warren Harding (1921–23) and Calvin Coolidge (1923–29), the federal government generally pursued laissez-faire economic policies. After the onset of the Great Depression, President Franklin D. Roosevelt implemented many economic regulations, including the National Industrial Recovery Act (which was struck down by the Supreme Court), regulation of trucking, airlines and communications, the Securities Exchange Act of 1934, and the Glass–Steagall Act of 1933. These regulations stayed largely in place until Richard Nixon's Administration. In supporting his competition-limiting regulatory initiatives President Roosevelt blamed the excesses of big business for causing an economic bubble. However, historians lack consensus in describing the causal relationship between various events and the role of government economic policy in causing or ameliorating the Depression.

==== 1970–2000 ====
Deregulation gained momentum in the 1970s, influenced by research by the Chicago school of economics and the theories of George Stigler, Alfred E. Kahn, and others. The new ideas were widely embraced by both liberals and conservatives. Two leading think tanks in Washington, the Brookings Institution and the American Enterprise Institute, were active in holding seminars and publishing studies advocating deregulatory initiatives throughout the 1970s and 1980s. Cornell economist Alfred E. Kahn played a central role in both theorizing and participating in the Carter Administration's efforts to deregulate transportation.

Despite these efforts, according to a report by the free-market Mercatus Center at George Mason University, drawing on the US government's Code of Federal Regulations:

From 1970 to 1981, restrictions were added at an average rate of about 24,000 per year. From 1981 to 1985, that pace slowed to an average of 620 restrictions per year, before accelerating back to 18,000 restrictions per year from 1985 to 1995. A decrease of 27,000 restrictions occurred from 1995 to 1996—3.2 percent of the 1995 total—and in the 20 years since then, regulation has grown steadily by about 13,000 restrictions per year. These periods do not match up neatly with any president or party; rather, regulatory accumulation seems to be a bipartisan trend—or perhaps a bureaucratic trend independent of elected officials' ideologies.

==== Transportation ====
===== Nixon administration =====
The first comprehensive proposal to deregulate a major industry, transportation, originated in the Richard Nixon Administration and was forwarded to Congress in late 1971. This proposal was initiated and developed by an interagency group that included the Council of Economic Advisors (represented by Hendrik Houthakker and Thomas Gale Moore), White House Office of Consumer Affairs (represented by Jack Pearce), Department of Justice, Department of Transportation, Department of Labor, and other agencies.

The proposal addressed both rail and truck transportation, but not air carriage. (92d Congress, Senate Bill 2842) The developers of this legislation in this Administration sought to cultivate support from commercial buyers of transportation services, consumer organizations, economists, and environmental organization leaders. This 'civil society' coalition became a template for coalitions influential in efforts to deregulate trucking and air transport later in the decade.

===== Ford administration =====
After Nixon left office, the Gerald Ford presidency, with allied interests, secured passage of the first significant change in regulatory policy in a pro-competitive direction, in the Railroad Revitalization and Regulatory Reform Act of 1976.

===== Carter administration =====
President Jimmy Carter – aided by economic adviser Alfred E. Kahn – devoted substantial effort to transportation deregulation, and worked with Congressional and civil society leaders to pass the Airline Deregulation Act on October 24, 1978 – the first federal government regulatory regime, since the 1930s, to be completely dismantled.

Carter also worked with Congress to produce the Staggers Rail Act (signed October 14, 1980), and the Motor Carrier Act of 1980 (signed July 1, 1980).

===== 1970s deregulation effects =====
These were the major deregulation acts in transportation that set the general conceptual and legislative framework, which replaced the regulatory systems put in place between the 1880s and the 1930s. The dominant common theme of these Acts was to lessen barriers to entry in transport markets and promote more independent, competitive pricing among transport service providers, substituting the freed-up competitive market forces for detailed regulatory control of entry, exit, and price-making in transport markets. Thus deregulation arose, though regulations to promote competition were put in place.

===== Reagan administration =====
U.S. President Ronald Reagan campaigned on the promise of rolling back environmental regulations. His devotion to the economic beliefs of Milton Friedman led him to promote the deregulation of finance, agriculture, and transportation. A series of substantial enactments were needed to work out the process of encouraging competition in transportation. Interstate buses were addressed in 1982, in the Bus Regulatory Reform Act of 1982. Freight forwarders (freight aggregators) got more freedoms in the Surface Freight Forwarder Deregulation Act of 1986. As many states continued to regulate the operations of motor carriers within their own state, the intrastate aspect of the trucking and bus industries was addressed in the Federal Aviation Administration Authorization Act of 1994, which provided that "a State, political subdivision of a State, or political authority of two or more States may not enact or enforce a law, regulation, or other provision having the force and effect of law related to a price, route, or service of any motor carrier." 49 U.S.C. § 14501(c)(1) (Supp. V 1999).

Ocean transportation was the last to be addressed. This was done in two acts, the Shipping Act of 1984 and the Ocean Shipping Reform Act of 1998. These acts were less thoroughgoing than the legislation dealing with U.S. domestic transportation, in that they left in place the "conference" system in international ocean liner shipping, which historically embodied cartel mechanisms. However, these acts permitted independent rate-making by conference participants, and the 1998 Act permitted secret contract rates, which tend to undercut collective carrier pricing. According to the United States Federal Maritime Commission, in an assessment in 2001, this appears to have opened up substantial competitive activity in ocean shipping, with beneficial economic results.

==== Energy ====
The Emergency Petroleum Allocation Act was a regulating law, consisting of a mix of regulations and deregulation, which passed in response to OPEC price hikes and domestic price controls which affected the 1973 oil crisis in the United States. After adoption of this federal legislation, numerous state laws known as Natural Gas Choice programs have sprung up in several states, as well as the District of Columbia. Natural Gas Choice programs allow residential and small volume natural gas users to compare purchases from natural gas suppliers with traditional utility companies. There are currently hundreds of federally unregulated natural gas suppliers operating in the US. Regulation characteristics of Natural Gas Choice programs vary between the laws of the currently adopted 21 states (as of 2008).

Deregulation of the electricity sector in the U.S. began in 1992. The Energy Policy Act of 1992 eliminated obstacles for wholesale electricity competition, but deregulation has yet to be introduced in all states. As of April 2014, 16 U.S. states (Connecticut, Delaware, Illinois, Maine, Maryland, Massachusetts, Michigan, Montana, New Hampshire, New Jersey, New York, Ohio, Oregon, Pennsylvania, Rhode Island, and Texas) and the District of Columbia have introduced deregulated electricity markets to consumers in some capacity. Additionally, seven states (Arizona, Arkansas, California, Nevada, New Mexico, Virginia, and Wyoming) began the process of electricity deregulation in some capacity but have since suspended deregulation efforts.

==== Communications ====
Deregulation was put into effect in the communications industry by the government at the start of the Multi-Channel Transition era. This deregulation put into place a division of labor between the studios and the networks. Communications in the United States (and internationally) are areas in which both technology and regulatory policy have been in flux. The rapid development of computer and communications technology – particularly the Internet – have increased the size and variety of communications offerings. Wireless, traditional landline telephone, and cable companies increasingly invade each other's traditional markets and compete across a broad spectrum of activities. The Federal Communications Commission and Congress appear to be attempting to facilitate this evolution. In mainstream economic thinking, development of this competition would militate against detailed regulatory control of prices and service offerings, and hence favor deregulation of prices and entry into markets. On the other hand, there exists substantial concern about concentration of media ownership resulting from relaxation of historic controls on media ownership designed to safeguard diversity of viewpoint and open discussion in the society, and about what some perceive as high prices in cable company offerings at this point.

==== Finance ====
The financial sector in the U.S. has been considerably deregulated in recent decades, which has allowed for greater financial risktaking. The financial sector used its considerable political sway in Congress and in the political establishment and influenced the ideology of political institutions to press for more and more deregulation. Among the most important of the regulatory changes was the Depository Institutions Deregulation and Monetary Control Act of 1980, which repealed the parts of the Glass–Steagall Act regarding interest rate regulation via retail banking. The Financial Services Modernization Act of 1999 repealed part of the Glass–Steagall Act of 1933, removing barriers in the market that prohibited any one institution from acting as any combination of an investment bank, a commercial bank, and an insurance company.

Such deregulation of the financial sector in the United States fostered greater risk-taking by finance sector firms through the creation of innovative financial instruments and practices, including securitization of loan obligations of various sorts and credit default swaps. This caused a series of financial crises, including the savings and loan crisis, the Long-Term Capital Management (LTCM) crisis, each of which necessitated major bailouts, and the derivatives scandals of 1994. These warning signs were ignored as financial deregulating continued, even in view of the inadequacy of industry self-regulation as shown by the financial collapses and bailout. The 1998 bailout of LTCM sent the signal to large "too-big-to-fail" financial firms that they would not have to suffer the consequences of the great risks they take. Thus, the greater risk-taking allowed by deregulation and encouraged by the bailout paved the way for the 2008 financial crisis.

==== Related legislation ====
- 1976 – Hart-Scott-Rodino Antitrust Improvements Act PL 94-435
- 1977 – Emergency Natural Gas Act PL 95-2
- 1978 – Airline Deregulation Act PL 95-50
- 1978 – National Gas Policy Act PL 95-621
- 1980 – Depository Institutions Deregulation and Monetary Control Act PL 96-221
- 1980 – Motor Carrier Act PL 96-296
- 1980 – Regulatory Flexibility Act PL 96-354
- 1980 – Staggers Rail Act PL 96-448
- 1982 – Garn–St. Germain Depository Institutions Act PL 97-320
- 1982 – Bus Regulatory Reform Act PL 97-261
- 1989 – Natural Gas Wellhead Decontrol Act PL 101-60
- 1992 – National Energy Policy Act PL 102-486
- 1996 – Telecommunications Act PL 104-104
- 1999 – Gramm-Leach-Bliley Act PL 106-102

== See also ==
- Accelerated approval (FDA)
- Corporatocracy
- Deregulated capitalism
- Ease of Doing Business Index
- Electricity provider switching
- Night-watchman state
- Political economy
- Public service company
- Red tape
- Regulatory reform
- Stranded costs
