= Hippie bus =

Hippie bus is a slang term and may refer to:

- Any of a number of small long-distance bus companies that operated in the United States in the 1970s, including
  - Green Tortoise
  - Grey Rabbit
- A Volkswagen Type 2, or VW bus

== See also ==
- Further (bus)
