= Disinvestment in India =

Disinvestment in India is a policy of the Government of India, wherein the Government liquidates its assets in the State/Country owned Enterprises partially or fully. The decision to disinvest is mainly to reduce the fiscal burden and bridge the revenue shortfall of the government. The key engine in achieving growth in India during post-independence was played by Public Sector Enterprises (PSE). Among other responsibilities of PSE's post-independence, the social and developmental obligations of the nation were most important, which resulted in these units escaping competitive race. Later on the activities of the PSU's were divergent, concentrating towards more non-core areas like hotels and consumer goods among others. Further, the public enterprises were used as tools for political and bureaucratic manipulation; which was consequential in low capacity utilization, reduced productivity, failure to innovate, and complex decision-making processes on vital issues of development.

By the end of the 1980s, the growth of the PSE's had turned into, as expressed by some commentators, an "end in itself". These factors became an obstacle to the growth of India. Therefore, the poor performance of the PSE's called for reforms to address the weakness in India's development. After the change of Government in 1991, among many economic reforms launched; privatization was one, which focused on the efforts required to be taken to curtail the fiscal burden of the state by reducing public sector borrowings and bring in fiscal austerity.

== Background ==
The economic policies of the colonial governments during the pre-independence era were mainly focused on promoting their home country rather than India. Hence, most of the industrial activity was centered on exporting raw materials and importing finished products from Britain. India's Economic and Industrial policy after independence was worked out on the lines of the Soviet Union, which was characterized as the 'Socialist framework'. However, this socialist policy of industrialization regulated most of the private enterprises with rigid restrictions over its operations, resulting in an ineffective industrial system to be replaced by Import-substitution industrialization. Further, disappointing performance by the industrial sector and Balance of Payment crisis of 1991 forced the policymakers to reassess the situation and program reforms towards a further open-market oriented policy.

== Mandate ==
In 1996, the Government of India set up a Disinvestment Commission under the Ministry of Industries; the mandate of the commission was to assess the viability and advice the Government on disinvesting various PSE's through market development and diversifying transfer of ownership of the PSU's for five-ten years period. On 10 December 1999, the commission was dissolved and all the decisions on disinvestments in India were taken by a separate Department of Disinvestments that was formed under the Ministry of Finance. In 2001, the Vajpayee government upgraded the Department of Disinvestment to a full-fledged Ministry. But in 2004, the Manmohan Singh government, first among many decisions taken, was to shut down the ministry and merge it in the Finance ministry as an independent department. Later, the Department of Disinvestments was renamed as Department of Investments and Public Asset Management (DIPAM) on 14 April 2016.

The mandate of DIPAM is as follows:

- All matters relating to management of Central Government investments in equity including disinvestment of equity in Central Public Sector Undertakings.
- All matters relating to sale of Central Government equity through offer for sale or private placement or any other mode in the erstwhile Central Public Sector Undertakings.

All other post disinvestment matters, including those relating to and arising out of the exercise of Call option by the Strategic Partner in the erstwhile Central Public Sector Undertakings, shall continue to be handled by the administrative Ministry or Department concerned, where necessary, in consultation with the Department of Investment and Public Asset Management (DIPAM).

== Disinvestment policies ==
The policy on disinvestment has evolved considerably through President's address to Joint Sessions of Parliament and statement of the Finance Minister's in their Budget Speeches.

=== 1991 to 1999 ===
To redefine the economic reforms in the country and the performance of PSU's, a new Industrial policy was drawn up in 1991, which discussed the role of PSU and came up with a comprehensive policy for disinvestment of public sector undertakings. The policy brought autonomy to the PSU boards and encouraged them to improve efficiency in their operations. The Government identified PSU's under priority areas and concentrated towards them and subsequently privatized most of the loss-making entities. Under Industrial restructuring, the Government opened up most of the sectors to the private entities. While, Public sector concentrated towards Railways, Mining, and atomic energy. Another key prospect of the 1991 policy was to end "red-tapism" which was known as Industrial licensing, wherein the requirement to get a license to start a private sector industry was abolished. Thereby, cutting down unnecessary delays in establishing an industrial unit by any private entity.

One of the key accomplishments of the industrial policy statement, as indicated in the Union Budget of 1992 was: it reduced the industries reserved for the public sector from seventeen to four. Further, the budgetary provisions for the PSUs were sharply curtailed and most of the loss-making enterprises were referred to the Board of Industrial and Financial Reconstruction. A committee was set up to develop guidelines for disinvestments headed by C. Rangarajan. The commission submitted its report in 1993, which recommended: disinvestments up to 49 percent to be allowed in companies reserved for the public sector and 100 percent in other entities.

=== 1999 to 2004 ===
The disinvestment policy of the Vajpayee led NDA Government during 1999-2004 accelerated the disinvestment process in the country. The Government made a significant change in disinvestments, it was the same government that used the expression "Privatization" in place of disinvestment for the first time. The new method used by the government was, classifying the PSUs in two categories: Strategic and Non-Strategic; all the industries dealing with defense-related equipment were described as strategic resources and no disinvestments were recommended for these sectors. whereas, it was proposed to bring down government stake to 26 percent in all other non-strategic sectors. The policy of the NDA government was to strengthen the PSUs in strategic sectors by privatizing non-strategic companies. The government focussed on the privatization of the non-strategic PSUs up to 26 percent or lower if needed. Looking back at the Vajpayee led NDA term in office, some economic scholars have applauded the earlier NDA government's effort towards disinvestment and have observed: "the disinvestment policy witnessed a golden period during late Prime Minister Atal Bihari Vajpayee-led NDA government".

=== 2004 to 2014 ===
So far, the Manmohan Singh led UPA-I and UPA-II governments were in power from 2004 to 2014; data from DIPAM indicates, the government did not take enough interest in the disinvestment program and interrupted the long-term growth story of India. UPA-I government in 2004, devised a National Common Minimum Programme (NCMP) in which, it laid out its policy towards disinvestment briefly. some of the excerpts of (NCMP) declared: No profit-making enterprises shall be privatized, all Navratna companies shall be retained and encouraged to mobilize resources through the capital market, attempts shall be carried out to strengthen all loss-making PSUs and chronically sick-industries shall be sold off, duly compensating the work-force, all the revenue generated from privatization shall be used for selected social sector schemes. The UPA government in first among many other decisions taken discontinued the process of the "Strategic sale" policy of earlier National Democratic Alliance; and particularly minority stake was auctioned in some PSUs.

== Impact of disinvestment ==
While disinvestments in India have been practiced, largely by transferring a limited extent of equity to a private entity and not by carrying out a complete transfer of ownership of the PSUs. Thus, some observers have used the term partial privatization as a better fit for such a transaction. Dr. Sudhir Naib in his book titled Disinvestment in India: Policies, Procedures, Practices writes, "the government has gradually moved from disinvestments to privatization." Further, through his research, the author has found that, whenever there was a transfer of ownership in any PSEs' to private entities through disinvestment, the economic efficiency of the relevant enterprise was improved. Similarly, Harjit Singh in his book titled Corporate Restructuring through Disinvestment (An Indian perspective) writes; the performance of the PSU's did not increase considerably post minority disinvestment, since the managerial control of the company continued to be the same. Hence, the author notes: it is not the size of the disinvestment that improves efficiency, but the change in leadership of the company and other market driving factors like innovation, technology, administrative intervention which affects the economic efficiency.

== Politics of disinvestment ==
As the process of disinvestment dilutes the state's ownership in PSUs, some scholars have observed, various political factors could also develop into an obstacle in dealing with disinvestment policies. Jain and Sarkar, in their research conducted in 2017 found: disinvestments are higher, when pursued by a right-leaning political party including coalition parties with similar ideologies than left-leaning parties. The study also hypothesized, the more center and state cohesion in ideologies, the prospects of disinvestments improve significantly. Some analysts have observed, the reason for not implementing the disinvestment policy to the core was because of a lack of a clear majority of the Congress party in the Lok Sabha after the 2004 general elections. Resulting in their reliance on outside support from Left-leaning parties like CPI-M, which caused the government to confront many challenges as both the parties had differing ideologies on distinct issues.

== Bibliography ==
- Ghosh, Saptarshi; Devaiah, Vishwas H. (2009). "A critical discussion of the disinvestment/privatization process in India since the start of the economic reforms in 1991". Journal of Asian Public Policy. 2 (2): 222–231. doi:10.1080/17516230903027922. ISSN 1751-6234. S2CID 154886805.
