= Grey Rabbit (disambiguation) =

Grey Rabbit may refer to:

- Grey Rabbit, an American company that provided intercity bus service
- Grey Rabbit (horse), winner of the Prix Ferdinand Dufaure in 1974
- Little Grey Rabbit, a character in an English children's book series
- Grey Rabbit (Sylvilagus floridanus), Eastern cottontail rabbit
