= Fritz G. Lanham =

American politician (1880–1965)

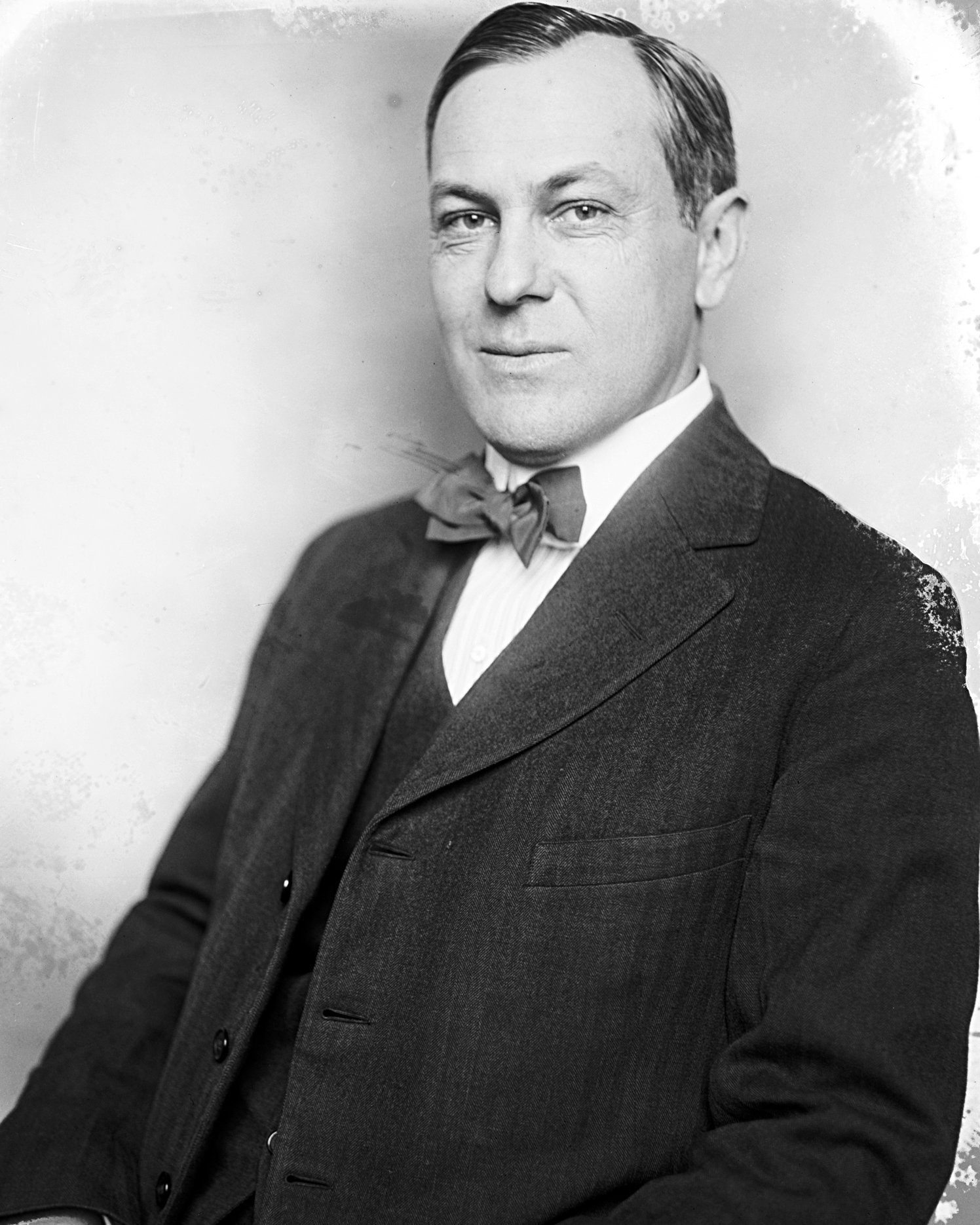
- National Photo Company Collection, Library of Congress

Chairman of the House Committee on Public Buildings and Grounds
- In office March 4, 1931 – January 3, 1947
- Preceded by: Richard N. Elliott
- Succeeded by: George A. Dondero (as chairman of the Committee on Public Works)

Member of the U.S. House of Representatives from Texas's 12th district
- In office April 19, 1919 – January 3, 1947
- Preceded by: James C. Wilson
- Succeeded by: Wingate H. Lucas

Personal details
- Born: Frederick Garland Lanham; January 3, 1880 Weatherford, Texas
- Died: July 31, 1965 (aged 85) Austin, Texas
- Party: Democratic
- Spouses: Beulah Rowe (m. 1908; died 1930) Hazel Head (m. 1931)
- Parent(s): S. W. T. Lanham; Sarah Beona Meng
- Education: Weatherford College; University of Texas at Austin
- Profession: Lawyer

Frederick Garland "Fritz" Lanham (January 3, 1880 – July 31, 1965) was a Democratic member of the United States House of Representatives from the state of Texas.

== Early life ==
Born in Weatherford, Texas, Lanham was the son of Sarah Beona (née Meng) and Samuel Willis Tucker Lanham, later an eight term member of the U.S. House of Representatives and Governor of Texas. He was given the nickname "Fritz" by a neighbor. During his father's congressional career, he attended public schools in Washington, D.C., and went on to earn as B.A. from Weatherford College in 1897. He attended Vanderbilt University from 1897 to 1898, and then the University of Texas at Austin, where he was the first editor of the student newspaper, The Texan, graduating in 1900.

After serving as his father's secretary and working in a Weatherford bank, Lanham returned to UT to study law. He subsequently held jobs at the Texas School for the Deaf in Austin and at The Dallas Morning News. An amateur magician, he wrote two musical comedies with his brother, as well as toured with a stage company in 1907. Although he did not earn a legal degree, Lanham was admitted to the bar in 1909, commencing practice in Weatherford. In addition, he was the first editor of The Alcalde, the UT alumni magazine, from 1913. During World War I, he spoke at Liberty bond drives, solicited subscriptions for the Red Cross, and entertained troops in camps around Fort Worth.

== Political career ==
Lanham's first run for office, for Parker County Attorney, was unsuccessful and he subsequently moved to Fort Worth in 1917, becoming an assistant county attorney in Tarrant County. In 1919, he won a special election to Congress in Texas's 12th congressional district, succeeding fellow Democrat James Clifton Wilson, who resigned to accept a judgeship on the U.S. District Court for the Northern District of Texas. He was reelected thirteen times, serving until his retirement in 1946.

In Congress, Lanham served on the committee on the District of Columbia, the Committee on Patents, the Committee on Public Lands, and the Committee on Public Buildings and Grounds, the last of which he became chairman of starting in 1931. He was the lead sponsor of the National Housing for Defense Act and the Community Facilities Act of 1940 (the Lanham Act), both of which passed just prior to American entry into World War II, as well as the Lanham Act, a standing federal law which protects against trademark infringement, trademark dilution, and false advertising.

After retiring from Congress he remained in Washington as a lobbyist for the National Patent Council, the American Fair Trade Council, and the Trinity Improvement Association of Texas, which he was named vice president of in 1946.

== Marriages and death ==
Lanham was married twice: first to Beulah Rowe of Austin on October 27, 1908, and then, following her death in 1930, he married Hazel Head on November 17, 1931. He moved to Austin in 1963, where he died on July 31, 1965, of a heart attack. He was buried at City Greenwood Cemetery in Weatherford.

The Fritz G. Lanham Federal Building in Fort Worth, built in 1966, is named in his honor.

U.S. House of Representatives
Preceded by James C. Wilson	Member of the U.S. House of Representatives from Texas's 12th congressional district April 19, 1919 – January 3, 1947	Succeeded by Wingate H. Lucas
