= Wingate H. Lucas =

American politician

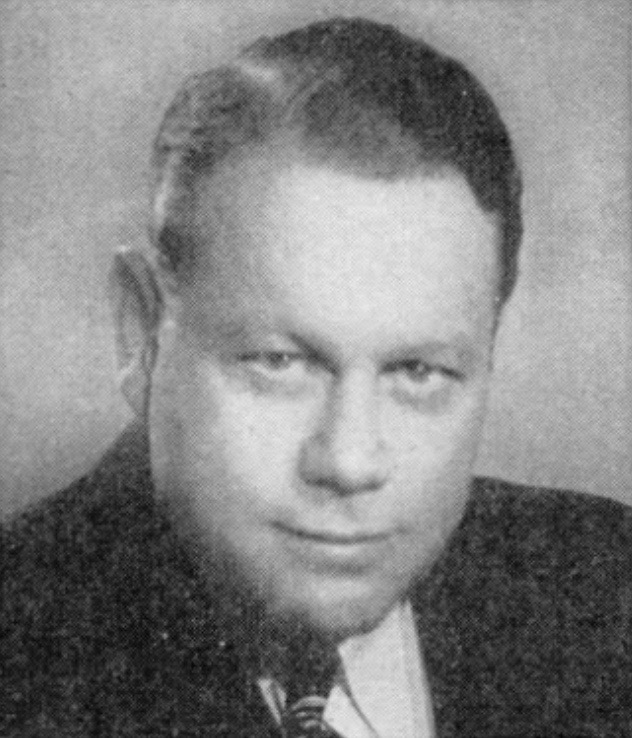

Member of the U.S. House of Representatives from Texas's 12th district
- In office January 3, 1947 – January 3, 1955
- Preceded by: Fritz G. Lanham
- Succeeded by: Jim Wright

Personal details
- Born: Wingate Hezekiah Lucas; May 1, 1908 Grapevine, Texas, U.S.
- Died: May 26, 1989 (aged 81) Bristol, Tennessee, U.S.
- Party: Democratic
- Education: North Texas Teachers College; Oklahoma Agricultural and Mechanical College; University of Texas at Austin
- Profession: Politician, lawyer

Military service
- Allegiance: United States
- Branch/service: United States Army
- Years of service: 1943–1945

Wingate Hezekiah Lucas (May 1, 1908 – May 26, 1989) was a U.S. Representative from Texas.

Born in Grapevine, Texas, Lucas attended the public schools, the North Texas Teachers College at Denton, the Oklahoma Agricultural and Mechanical College at Stillwater, and the University of Texas at Austin. He studied law. In 1938, he was admitted to the bar and commenced practice in Grapevine, Texas. He served as an enlisted man in the United States Army from 1943 to 1945 with overseas service in the European Theater of Operations. After the war, he resumed the practice of law.

Lucas was elected as a Democrat to the Eightieth and to the three succeeding Congresses (January 3, 1947 – January 3, 1955). He succeeded the retiring Fritz Lanham in the seat, for whom he had clerked for seven years. Nonetheless, the nomination required fending off eleven other candidates and winning a run-off with only 51%.

While having to compete for the nomination in each subsequent cycle, Lucas was not threatened until 1954. Jim Wright, ultimately a Speaker of the House, defeated him and Fort Worth Star-Telegram published Amon Carter for the nomination to the Eighty-fourth Congress. Lusk was relatively active in the House, although sponsoring only one enacted bill, that to prevent the introduction of nonnative mollusks into the country. He was most active in his support for the proposed Dallas-Fort Worth airport.

Those who think of national representatives as a class above should consider this. On taking his seat in 1947, Lucas traveled to Washington alone, then returned to gather his wife, their four children under the age of six, and a pickup truck loaded with canned goods that wife Jerry had put up.

Lucas moved to Connecticut in 1955 as a consultant for Sears Roebuck, then became a government relations executive with General Electric in New York City from 1958 to 1966, and executive director of the Mid-Appalachia College Council from 1966 to 1986. As with many ex-members of Congress, he became a lobbyist and did not return to his home state until interment.

He was a resident of Bristol, Tennessee, until his death there on May 26, 1989.

== Sources ==
- United States Congress. "Wingate H. Lucas (id: L000496)". Biographical Directory of the United States Congress.

U.S. House of Representatives
Preceded by Fritz G. Lanham	Member of the U.S. House of Representatives from Texas's 12th congressional district 1947-1955	Succeeded by Jim Wright
