= Oscar W. Gillespie =

American politician (1858–1927)

Oscar William Gillespie
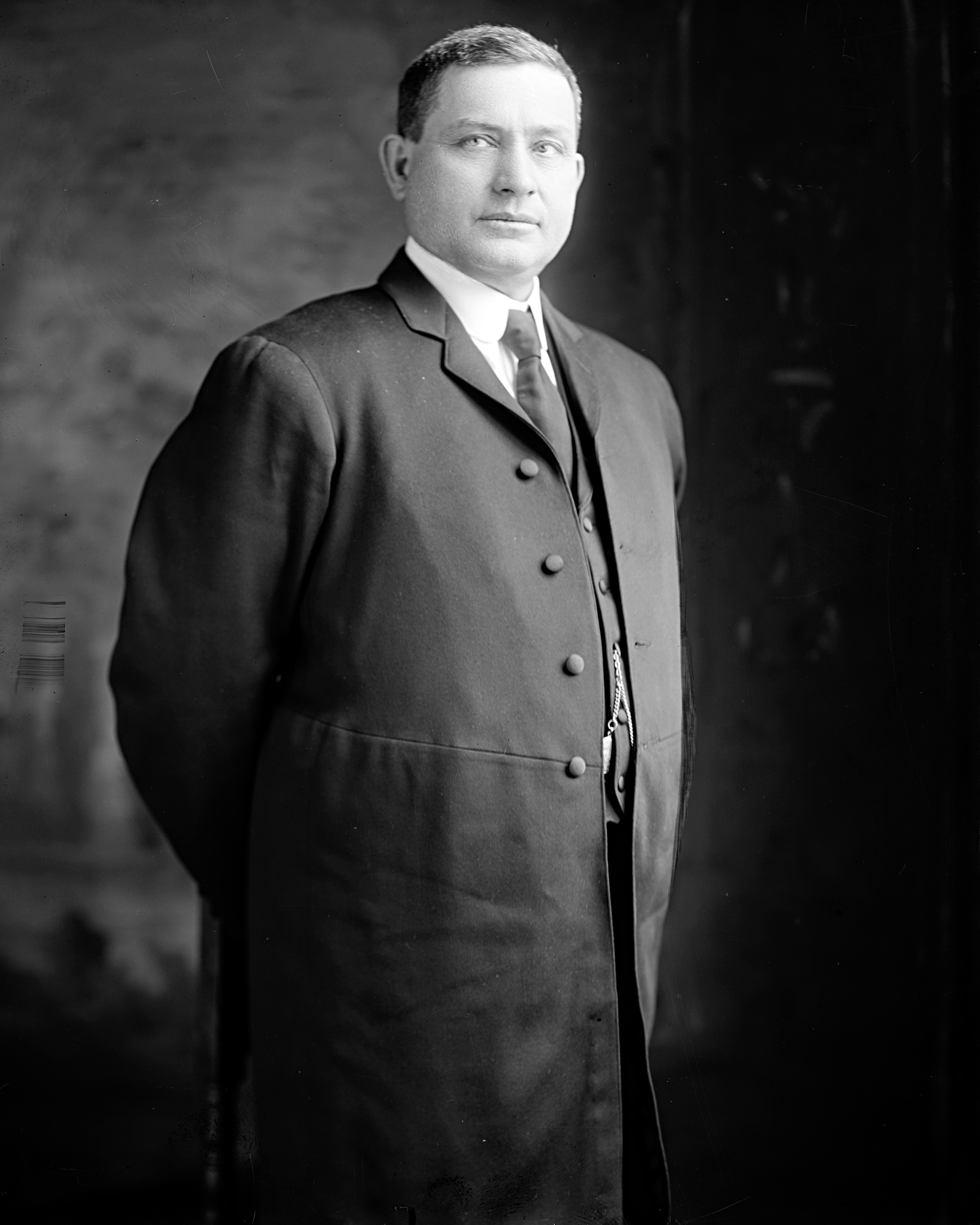

Member of the U.S. House of Representatives from Texas's Twelfth district
- In office March 4, 1903 – March 3, 1911
- Preceded by: James L. Slayden
- Succeeded by: Oscar Callaway

Personal details
- Born: June 20, 1858 Near Quitman, Mississippi, U.S.
- Died: August 23, 1927 (aged 69) Fort Worth, Texas, U.S.
- Resting place: Mansfield Cemetery, Mansfield, Texas
- Party: Democratic
- Spouse: Ada Kate Hodges
- Education: Mansfield College, Texas
- Occupation: Attorney
- Known for: U.S. Representative for Texas

Oscar William Gillespie (June 20, 1858 – August 23, 1927) was a U.S. Representative for the state of Texas.

Born near Quitman, Mississippi, Gillespie attended private schools and graduated from Mansfield college, Texas, in 1885. He studied law. He was admitted to the bar in 1886 and commenced his law practice in Fort Worth, Texas. He was assistant attorney of Tarrant County from 1886 to 1888. He then served as prosecuting attorney of Tarrant County from 1890 to 1894.

Gillespie was elected as a Democrat to the Fifty-eighth Congress from Texas's 12th congressional district, and to the three succeeding Congresses, serving from March 4, 1903 until March 4, 1911. He was an unsuccessful candidate for renomination in 1910.

Gillespie's original nomination to Congress was the result of a game of lots. In 1902, the Democrats were unable to decide among three candidates for nomination to Texas's 12th Congressional District. Gillespie and his main opponent, Judge Lee Riddle, put their names in a hat, drew one out and the loser agreed to withdraw and support the winner. Gillespie won the game of lots, and was nominated on the 7201st ballot.

He resumed the practice of law in Fort Worth, where he died August 23, 1927. He was married Ms. Ada Kate Hodges on December 23, 1884. He is interred in Mansfield cemetery in Mansfield, Texas.

== Sources ==
- United States Congress. "Oscar W. Gillespie (id: G000198)". Biographical Directory of the United States Congress.

U.S. House of Representatives
Preceded by James L. Slayden	Member of the U.S. House of Representatives from Texas's 12th congressional district 1903-1911	Succeeded by Oscar Callaway
