= James Clifton Wilson =

American judge

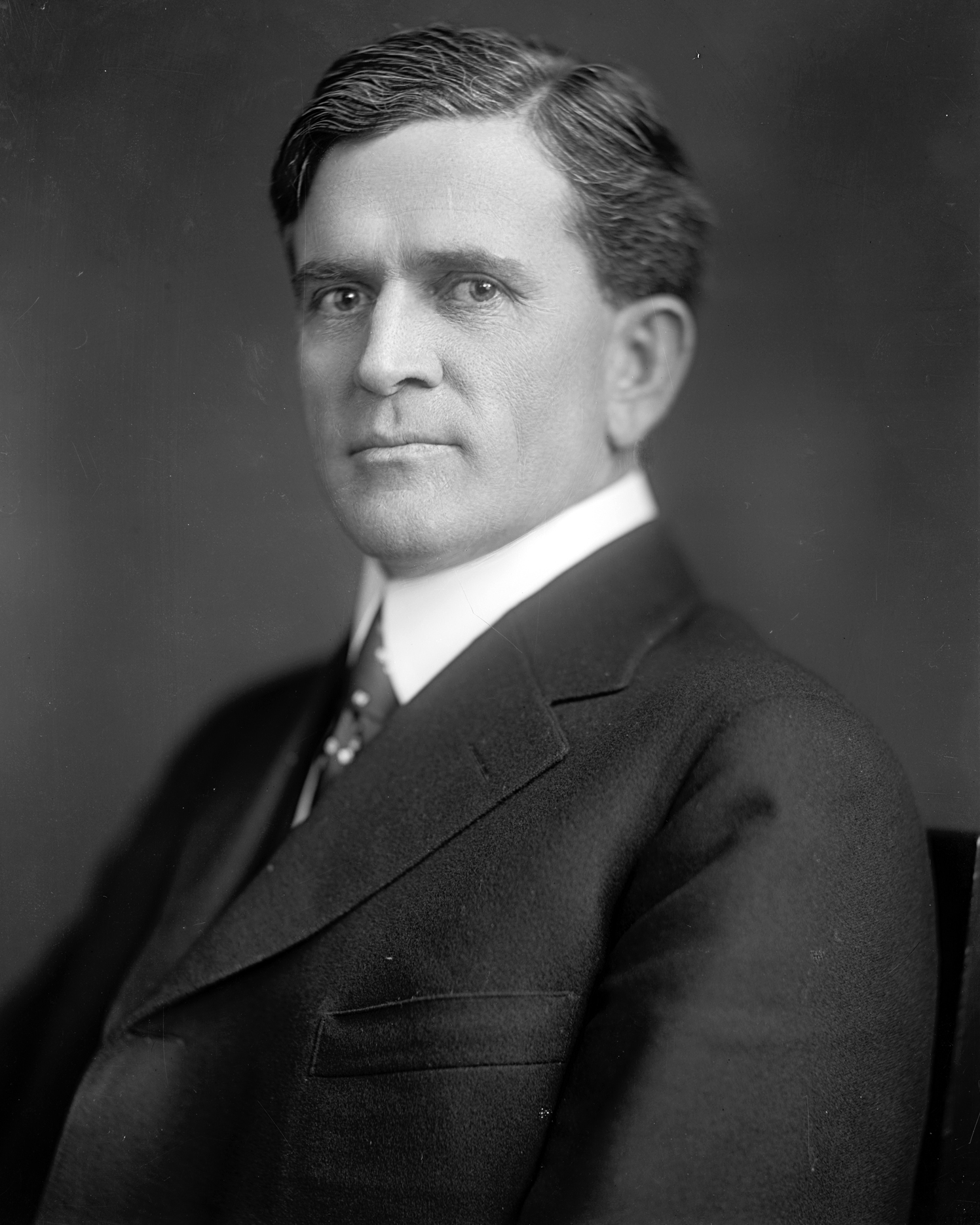
- Wilson in 1917

Senior Judge of the United States District Court for the Northern District of Texas
- In office July 31, 1947 – August 3, 1951

Judge of the United States District Court for the Northern District of Texas
- In office March 5, 1919 – July 31, 1947
- Appointed by: Woodrow Wilson
- Preceded by: Seat established by 40 Stat. 1183
- Succeeded by: Joseph Brannon Dooley

Member of the U.S. House of Representatives from Texas's 12th district
- In office March 4, 1917 – March 3, 1919
- Preceded by: Oscar Callaway
- Succeeded by: Fritz G. Lanham

Personal details
- Born: James Clifton Wilson; June 21, 1874 Palo Pinto, Texas, US
- Died: August 3, 1951 (aged 77) Fort Worth, Texas, US
- Resting place: Greenwood Memorial Park; Fort Worth, Texas
- Party: Democratic
- Education: Weatherford College; University of Texas School of Law (LL.B.)

James Clifton Wilson (June 21, 1874 – August 3, 1951) was a United States representative from Texas and was a United States district judge of the United States District Court for the Northern District of Texas.

== Education and career ==
Wilson was born on June 21, 1874, in Palo Pinto, Palo Pinto County, Texas. He attended the public schools and graduated from Weatherford College in 1889. He received a Bachelor of Laws from University of Texas School of Law in 1896 and was admitted to the bar the same year. He was in private practice of law in Weatherford, Texas from 1896 to 1902. He was an Assistant Prosecuting Attorney of Parker County, Texas from 1898 to 1900. He was the Prosecuting Attorney of Parker County from 1902 to 1912. He served as Chairman of the Democratic county executive committee, from 1908 to 1912. After moving to Fort Worth, Texas, he was an Assistant District Attorney of Tarrant County, Texas from 1912 to 1913. He was the United States Attorney for the Northern District of Texas from 1913 to 1917.

== Congressional service ==
Wilson was elected as a Democrat to the United States House of Representatives of the 65th and 66th United States Congresses but only served in the 65th Congress from March 4, 1917, to March 3, 1919. He did not take his seat in the 66th Congress, instead accepting a federal judicial post.

== Federal judicial service ==
Wilson received a recess appointment from President Woodrow Wilson on March 5, 1919, to the United States District Court for the Northern District of Texas, to a new seat authorized by 40 Stat. 1183. He was nominated to the same position by President Wilson on May 23, 1919. He was confirmed by the United States Senate on June 24, 1919, and received his commission the same day. He assumed senior status on July 31, 1947. His service terminated on August 3, 1951, due to his death in Fort Worth. He was interred at Rose Hill Cemetery in Fort Worth. In 1957, he was reinterred at Greenwood Memorial Park in Fort Worth.

== Sources ==
- "James Clifton Wilson". Biographical Directory of the United States Congress.
- "The Political Graveyard: Tarrant County, Tex". politicalgraveyard.com.
- Guttery, Ben R. (1 October 2007). Representing Texas. Ben Guttery. ISBN 9781419678844 – via Google Books.
- Wilson, James C. "A Guide to the James C. Wilson Biographical Sketch, 1874-1951". legacy.lib.utexas.edu.

U.S. House of Representatives
Preceded by Oscar Callaway	Member of the U.S. House of Representatives from Texas's 12th congressional district 1917–1919	Succeeded by Fritz G. Lanham
Legal offices
Preceded by Seat established by 40 Stat. 1183	Judge of the United States District Court for the Northern District of Texas; 1919–1947	Succeeded by Joseph Brannon Dooley
