= Jim Wright =

American politician (1922–2015)

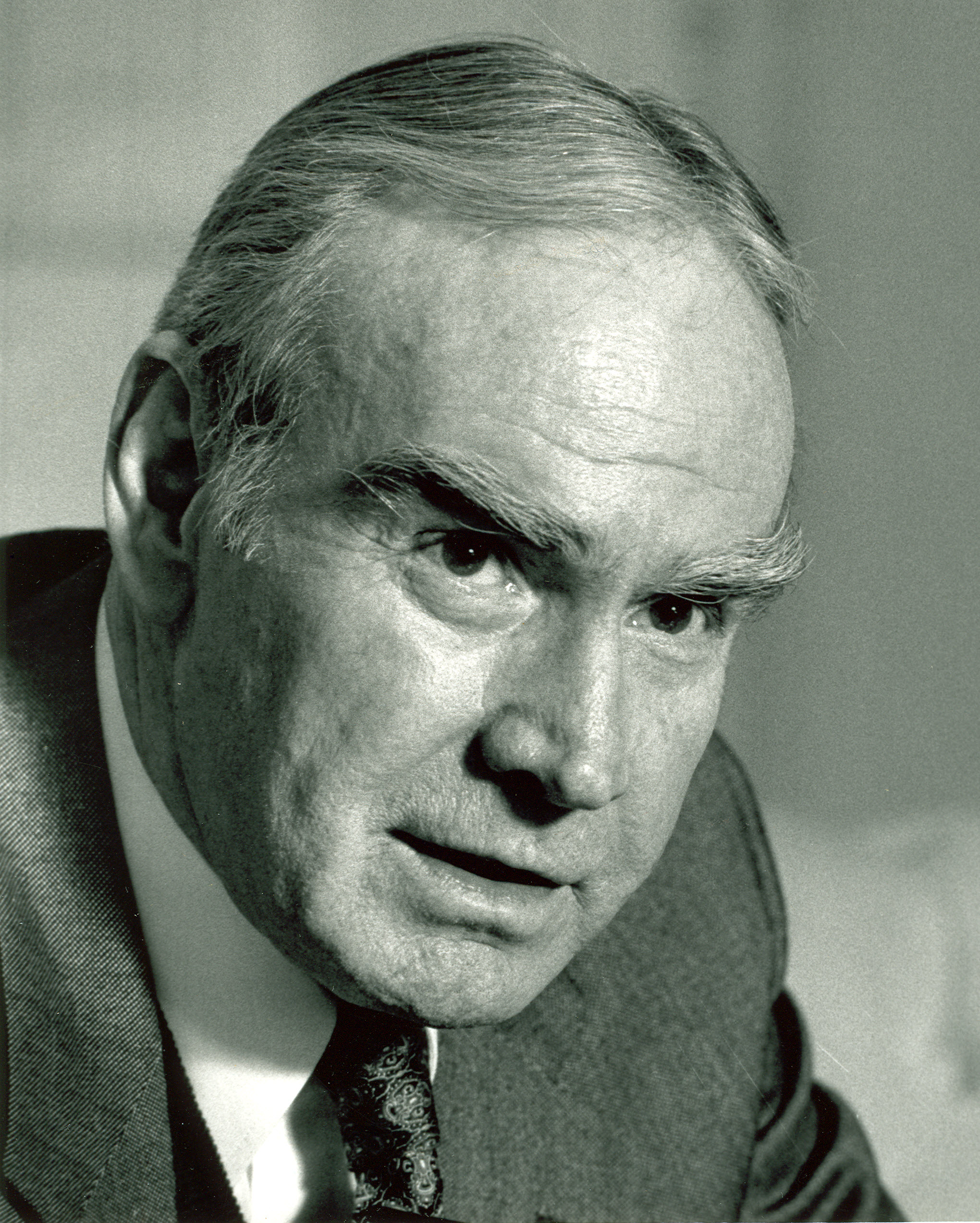
- Wright in the 1980s

48th Speaker of the United States House of Representatives
- In office January 6, 1987 – June 6, 1989
- Preceded by: Tip O'Neill
- Succeeded by: Tom Foley

Leader of the House Democratic Caucus
- In office January 6, 1987 – June 6, 1989
- Preceded by: Tip O'Neill
- Succeeded by: Tom Foley

House Majority Leader
- In office January 3, 1977 – January 3, 1987
- Deputy: John Brademas; Tom Foley
- Speaker: Tip O'Neill
- Preceded by: Tip O'Neill
- Succeeded by: Tom Foley

Member of the U.S. House of Representatives from Texas's 12th district
- In office January 3, 1955 – June 30, 1989
- Preceded by: Wingate Lucas
- Succeeded by: Pete Geren

Personal details
- Born: James Claude Wright Jr. December 22, 1922 Fort Worth, Texas, U.S.
- Died: May 6, 2015 (aged 92) Fort Worth, Texas, U.S.
- Resting place: City Greenwood Cemetery; Weatherford, Texas
- Party: Democratic
- Spouses: Mary Lemons (m. 1942–1972) Betty Hay (m. 1972)
- Children: 4
- Education: Weatherford College (attended); University of Texas at Austin (attended)

Military service
- Allegiance: United States
- Branch/service: United States Army
- Years of service: 1941–1946
- Rank: First Lieutenant
- Unit: United States Army Air Forces
- Battles/wars: World War II: Pacific Theater
- Awards: Distinguished Flying Cross
- Jim Wright's voice Wright honors Lady Bird Johnson at a special ceremony in the House of Representatives chamber Recorded April 28, 1988

James Claude Wright Jr. (December 22, 1922 – May 6, 2015) was an American politician who served as the 48th speaker of the United States House of Representatives from 1987 to 1989. He represented Texas' 12th congressional district as a Democrat from 1955 to 1989.

Born in Fort Worth, Texas, Wright won election to the Texas House of Representatives after serving in the United States Army Air Forces during World War II. He won election to Congress in 1954, representing a district that included his home town of Fort Worth. Like most Texas Democrats, Wright distinguished himself from many of his fellow Southern congressmen in his refusal to sign the 1956 Southern Manifesto. He voted for the Civil Rights Acts of 1960 and 1968, the final version of the Civil Rights Act of 1957, and the initial House amendment to the Voting Rights Act of 1965, but voted against the Civil Rights Act of 1964 and the 24th Amendment to the U.S. Constitution. He also became a senior member of the House Public Works Committee.

In 1976, Wright narrowly won election to the position of House Majority Leader. Wright voted in favor of the bill establishing Martin Luther King Jr. Day as a federal holiday in August 1983. He became Speaker of the House after Tip O'Neill retired in 1987. In March 1988, Wright led the House Democratic Caucus as Speaker to override President Reagan's veto of the Civil Rights Restoration Act of 1987. Wright resigned from Congress in June 1989 amid a House Ethics Committee investigation into compensation that he and his wife had received. After leaving Congress, Wright became a professor at Texas Christian University. He died in Fort Worth in 2015.

== Early life ==
Wright was born in Fort Worth, the son of Marie (Lyster) and James Claude Wright. Wright was of English and Irish ancestry. Because his father was a traveling salesman, Wright and his two sisters were reared in numerous communities in Texas and Oklahoma. He mostly attended Fort Worth and Dallas public schools, eventually graduating from Adamson High School (formerly Oak Cliff High School). He studied at Weatherford College and the University of Texas at Austin, but did not graduate.

In December 1941, Wright enlisted in the United States Army Air Forces, and after training, he was commissioned as a second lieutenant in the Air Corps in 1942. He trained as a bombardier and earned a Distinguished Flying Cross flying during combat in B-24 Liberators with the 530th Bomb Squadron, 380th Bomb Group (Heavy) in the South Pacific during World War II. His retelling of his wartime exploits is contained in his 2005 book The Flying Circus: Pacific War—1943—As Seen through A Bombsight.

After the war, he made his home in Weatherford, where he joined partners in forming a Trade Show exhibition and marketing firm. As a Democrat, he won his first election without opposition in 1946 to the Texas House of Representatives, where he served from 1947 to 1949. He was defeated in his bid for reelection in 1948, after a rival claimed that Wright was weak in opposing both communism and interracial marriage. He was the mayor of Weatherford from 1950 to 1954. In 1953, he served as president of the League of Texas Municipalities.

== Career in Congress ==
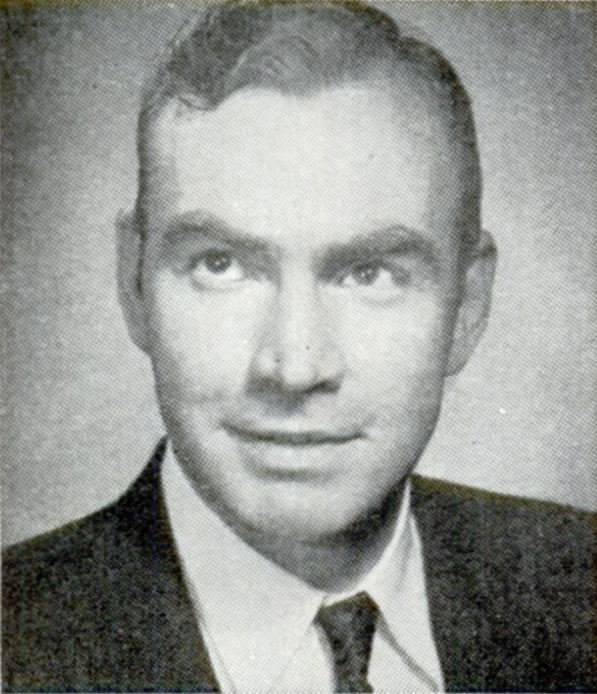
From 1957's Eighty-Fifth Congress Pocket Congressional Directory

In 1954, he was elected to Congress as a Democratic member of the House of Representatives from Texas' 12th district, which included Fort Worth and Weatherford. He won despite the fervid opposition of Fort Worth Star-Telegram publisher Amon G. Carter, who supported incumbent Democrat Wingate Lucas. Wright would be re-elected fourteen times, gradually rising in prominence in the party and in Congress. He developed a close relationship with Amon G. Carter Jr., and often repeated the axiom that the easiest way to "defeat an enemy is to make him your friend."

On the morning of November 22, 1963, Wright appeared with President John F. Kennedy at the Hotel Texas for a breakfast event and a short speech outside.

In 1956, Wright refused to join most of his regional colleagues in signing the segregationist Southern Manifesto, and voted in favor of the Civil Rights Acts of 1960 and 1968. Wright voted against the initial House resolution for the Civil Rights Act of 1957 on June 18, 1957, but voted in favor of the Senate amendment to the bill on August 27, 1957. Wright voted in favor of the House amendment to the Voting Rights Act of 1965 on July 9, 1965, but did not vote on the joint conference committee report on August 3, 1965. Wright voted against the Civil Rights Act of 1964. The bill required desegregation of public accommodations and established the Equal Employment Opportunity Commission, and Wright's reason for not supporting the bill had to do with the voting rights provision of the law, which Wright enthusiastically supported, and felt the Civil Rights Act was weak without the right to vote granted to all citizens. It was signed into law by Wright's friend, President Johnson. Wright also voted against the 24th Amendment to the U.S. Constitution. Wright would later vote in favor of the bill establishing Martin Luther King Jr. Day as a federal holiday in August 1983 as well as lead the House Democratic Caucus as Speaker in March 1988 to override President Reagan's veto of the Civil Rights Restoration Act of 1987.

In the Dallas–Fort Worth metroplex, Jim Wright is infamous for the Wright Amendment, a contentious law he sponsored that restricted air travel from Dallas' secondary airport, Love Field. Passed in 1979, the Wright Amendment was originally designed to protect the then-fledgling Dallas Fort Worth International Airport. The Amendment allows non-stop flights originating from or bound to any commercial airport within 50 nautical miles (93 km) of the DFW Airport Control Tower to serve only states bordering Texas. It was the compromise agreed to with Southwest Airlines to expand their territory beyond Texas. This requires any flight going to or coming from a destination within that 50-mile (80 km) radius (Dallas Love Field and the now-defunct Greater Southwest International Airport in Fort Worth were the only airports affected) to land in a contiguous (bordering) state before continuing on to its destination. This effectively limited traffic from Love Field and GSIA to small, regional airlines (and provided the springboard for the later success of Southwest Airlines, which initially flew only within Texas) who were largely unable to compete with DFW Airport as a result. While the Amendment was welcomed at first, there were increasing doubts about its necessity as DFW grew into one of the three largest airports in the world. Many saw it as a boondoggle to benefit one particular group. Others saw it as an unlawful restraint of trade imposed against the two affected airports, and no others, in spite of the fact that public officials of Dallas and Ft Worth had agreed to the restrictions (Virginia McGuire, daughter of James C. Wright, direct conversation). However, the largest opposition came increasingly from people who simply felt that the amendment had outlived its usefulness and was also an unwarranted intrusion on the free markets of the deregulated airline industry. In 2006, Congress passed the Wright Amendment Reform Act of 2006, which repealed the Wright Amendment in stages; the last restrictions on travel from Love Field were lifted on October 13, 2014.

Wright strongly supported the Superconducting Super Collider project in Waxahachie in Ellis County, but the work was halted in 1993.

=== Majority leader ===
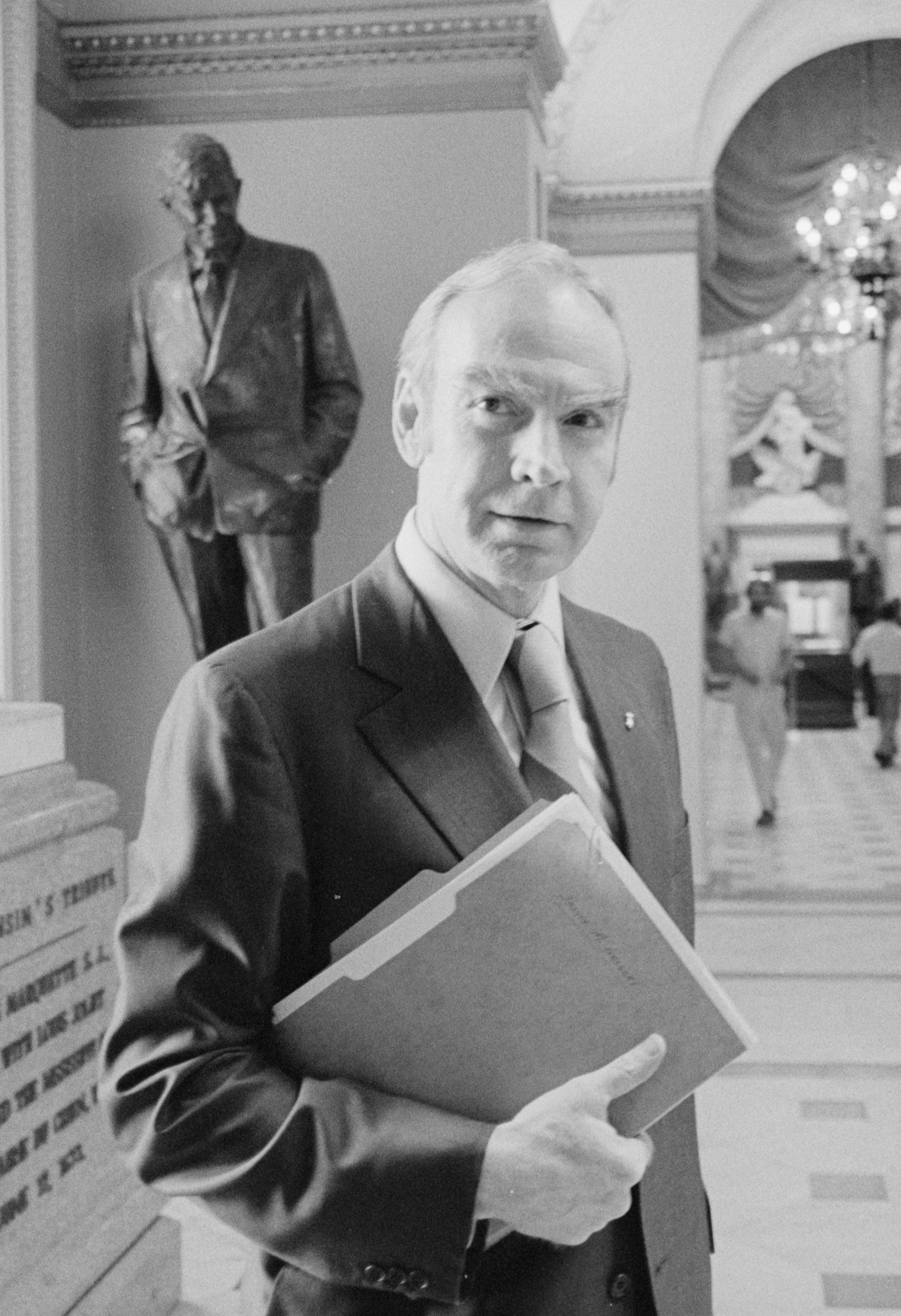
Wright at the Capitol in December 1976

In 1971, Wright was appointed a Democratic deputy whip, picked for ideological balance. In this role, he was assigned responsibility for persuading Southern Democrats to support House Democratic leadership. Though Wright never chaired a House committee or a high-profile subcommittee, he used his outgoing personality to obtain commitments from friends and his two decades of seniority on the Public Works Committee to amass obligations from colleagues by helping secure funding for federal buildings, roads, highway interchanges, and water projects. These efforts left him well-positioned to campaign for a position in the House leadership when a vacancy occurred.

In the December 1976 House Democratic leadership elections, Majority Leader Tip O'Neill faced no opposition to succeed Carl Albert as Speaker of the House. The contest to succeed O'Neill included Wright, Phillip Burton, Richard Bolling, and John McFall. Burton was assumed to be the frontrunner, and on the first ballot, he received 106 votes, Bolling 81, Wright 77, and McFall 31. According to Democratic caucus rules, the low finisher was obligated to withdraw, which McFall did. On the second ballot, Burton received 107 votes, Wright 95, and Bolling 93. With Bolling eliminated, on the third ballot, Wright won with 148 votes to 147 for Burton.

=== Speaker of the House ===
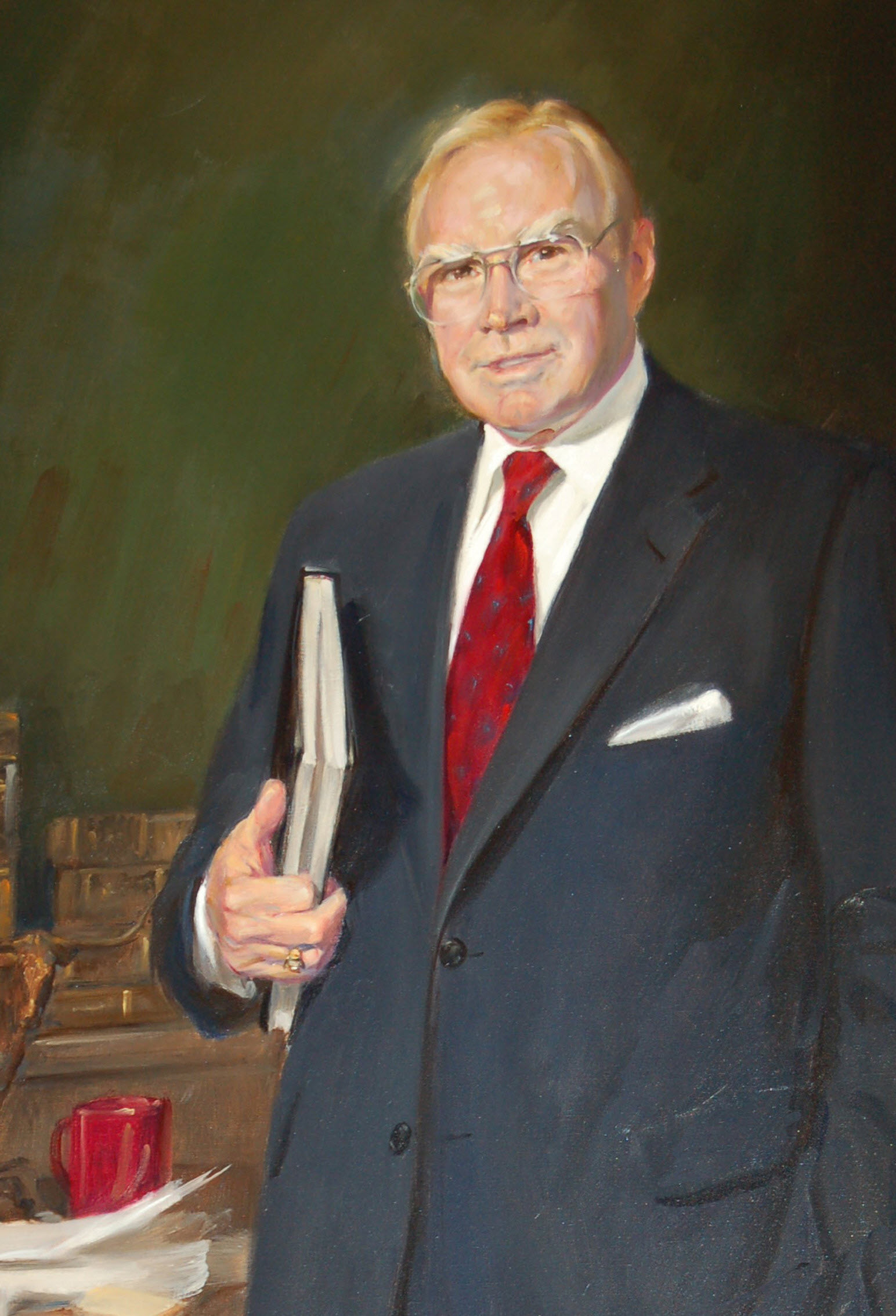
Speaker Wright, 1991; Oil portrait by Marshall Bouldin III.

When the 100th Congress convened on January 6, 1987, Wright was elected Speaker of the House (254–173 over Republican Robert H. Michel), succeeding Tip O'Neill, who had retired after 10 years in the post. At the time, Wright stated that being speaker of the House "is the greatest responsibility that can come to a lawmaker anywhere in the world."

In July 1988, he chaired the Democratic Party convention that nominated Michael Dukakis for president. During that convention, Wright introduced John F. Kennedy Jr. for Kennedy's first televised speech. Almost 25 years earlier, on November 22, 1963, President John F. Kennedy, in his last speech before being assassinated, praised Wright's service in the Congress, saying "and here in Fort Worth he has contributed to its growth. He speaks for Fort Worth and he speaks for the country, and I don't know any city that is better represented in the Congress of the United States than Fort Worth."

While Dukakis lost the 1988 presidential election to Republican George H. W. Bush, Democrats retained control of the House in the coinciding congressional elections, thus when the 101st Congress opened on January 3, 1989, Wright was re-elected as speaker. According to historian Julian E. Zelizer, the majority Democrats ran roughshod over the Republican (GOP) minority. They minimized the number of staff positions available to the minority, kept them out of decision-making, and gerrymandered their home districts. Firebrand Republican Newt Gingrich argued that American democracy was being ruined by the Democrats' tactics and that the GOP had to destroy the system before it could be saved. Cooperation in governance, says Zelizer, was put aside as they deposed Speaker Wright and regained power. Gingrich gained support from the media and from good government forces in his crusade to persuade Americans that the system was, in Gingrich's words, “morally, intellectually and spiritually corrupt.” Gingrich did force out Wright; but after he became speaker, Gingrich was himself forced out and scandal ruined the careers of other top GOP leaders.

==== Aide controversy ====
In May 1989, controversy arose when media reports revealed that Wright's top assistant, John Mack, had violently attacked a woman 16 years earlier. The woman, Pamela Small, was hit repeatedly with a hammer, stabbed and slashed with a knife and left for dead. Small survived the attack, and reported it to the police. Mack was convicted of malicious wounding and was sentenced to 15 years in prison, but was paroled after serving 27 months. Mack, whose brother was married to Wright's daughter, was given a clerk's job in the Capitol upon his release. He went on to become the executive director of the Democratic Steering and Policy Committee and served as Wright's chief legislative strategist. Critics, including feminist activist Andrea Dworkin, alleged that Wright manipulated the legal system to get Mack off and, subsequently, protected him from media scrutiny. Amid the blistering public condemnation, John Mack resigned from his post on May 11, and House members of both parties began to question whether Wright could long-remain as speaker.

==== Ethics investigation and resignation ====
In 1988 Wright became the target of an inquiry by the House Ethics Committee. Their report in early 1989 implied that he had used bulk purchases of his book, Reflections of a Public Man, to earn speaking fees in excess of the allowed maximum, and that his wife, Betty, was given a make work job and perks to avoid the limit on gifts. Faced with an increasing loss of effectiveness, Wright tendered his resignation as Speaker on May 31, 1989, the resignation to become effective on the selection of a successor. He was the first Speaker to resign because of a scandal. On June 6, the Democratic Caucus brought Wright's speakership to an end by selecting his replacement, Tom Foley of Washington, and on June 30 Wright resigned his seat in Congress.

The incident was controversial and was a part of the increasing partisan infighting that has plagued the Congress ever since. The original charges were filed by Newt Gingrich in 1988 and their effect propelled Gingrich's own career advancement to the Speaker's chair.

Michael Parenti, critic of the national security state, attributed Wright's forced resignation to the critical questions he was raising in the late 1980s with regard to CIA covert actions in Nicaragua. Wright had not only criticized Reagan's policy, but taken the extremely unusual step of entering into negotiations with the Nicaraguan government as Speaker.

William K. Black claims that Wright's interventions in the Savings and Loan (S&L) crisis "were decisive in forcing him to resign in disgrace from the House". Black wrote that Wright had been saved from financial ruin and elevated to Speaker of the House by massive campaign contributions from control frauds like Charles Keating. The control frauds managed to get hundreds of executives of S&Ls, many legitimate, to talk with their representatives in the US congress to delay effective governmental action against the frauds. This action only increased (a) the billions of dollars their ultimate failures cost the US taxpayers and (b) the magnitude of the resulting scandal. Wright's account of these facts was very different, citing both abuse of power by regulators, and money laundering by S&Ls in the profits diverted to Nicaragua in the Iran-Contra scandal. The scandal robbed Wright's Democratic party of the "sleaze factor" issue in the 1988 presidential election, thereby handing the election to the Republican George H. W. Bush, according to Black. He resigned to avoid the official documentation of his role in this that would almost certainly have come from hearings by the United States House Committee on Ethics, as it did for the Keating Five. Wright's personal and public account of why he resigned was very different from that cited by William Black, who claimed Wright abused his power and certainly had reason to protect his own position and decisions at the Federal Home Loan Bank.

The charges filed against Wright did not mention Nicaragua. The Iran-Contra operations from 1984 through most of 1986 involved the secret governmental support of Contra military and paramilitary activities in Nicaragua, despite Congressional prohibition on the support. The Reagan White House was very involved in the sale of U.S. arms to Iran in contravention of stated U.S. policy and in possible violation of arms-export controls. In late November 1986, Reagan Administration officials announced that some of the proceeds from the sale of U.S. arms to Iran had been diverted to the Contras. President Bush's pardon of Secretary Weinberger on December 24, 1992, pre-empted a trial in which defense counsel indicated that they intended to call Bush as a witness.

A report by special counsel implicated him in a number of influence peddling charges, such as Vernon Savings and Loan, and attempting to get William K. Black fired as the deputy director of the Federal Savings and Loan Insurance Corporation (FSLIC) under Gray. However, the charges against him concluded that, "while the Congressman's dealings with representatives of the Federal Home Loan Bank Board may have been intemperate, the committee was not persuaded that there is reason to believe that he exercised undue influence in his dealings with that agency."

== Life after Congress ==
After his resignation from the House, Wright retired to Fort Worth. He served as a professor at Texas Christian University there, teaching a course titled "Congress and the Presidents." He also wrote several books after his retirement. He was an avid reader but was stricken with macular degeneration.

In November 2013, Wright was denied a voter ID card at a Texas Department of Public Safety office, as he hadn't brought the duly-required documentation with him on the day of his visit. He told the Fort Worth Star Telegram that "Nobody was ugly to us, but they insisted that they wouldn't give me an ID." Wright expressed concern that the Texas voter ID law will unfairly deny elderly voters like himself the ability to vote. Wright indicated that he had worked out a solution with the Texas DPS that would allow him to cast a ballot in an upcoming election, but feared that other elderly people, especially those in retirement homes, would be unable to navigate the requirements.

Toward the end of his life, in May 2014, Wright expressed regret over resigning as Speaker of the House. He said it may have been a "gross misjudgment" at the time.

== Death ==
Wright died at the age of 92 on May 6, 2015. He was survived by his wife Betty and four children. He had previously undergone surgery twice to treat cancer, though it is not clear if his death was cancer-related.

House Minority Leader Nancy Pelosi, D-CA, stated, "Speaker Wright was a person of deep courage, brilliant eloquence, and complete mastery of the legislative process. Speaker Wright's strong, decisive leadership built an indelible legacy of progress, not only in his beloved state of Texas, but around the world. Wright championed prosperity for every working family, and helped lead the way to peace to Central America." The Speaker of the House, John Boehner, R-OH, stated that, "Speaker Wright understood as well as anyone this institution's closeness to the people, calling the House 'the raw essence of the nation'." President Barack Obama stated, "As a representative from Texas and Speaker of the House, Jim was passionate about investing in infrastructure, and he worked tirelessly to promote peace in Central America. Today, our thoughts and prayers are with Jim's family and friends, and the people he represented in Congress for so many years."

== See also ==
- List of federal political scandals in the United States

U.S. House of Representatives
Preceded by Wingate Lucas	Member of the U.S. House of Representatives from Texas's 12th congressional district 1955–1989	Succeeded by Pete Geren
Party political offices
Preceded by Tip O'Neill	House Majority Leader; 1977–1987	Succeeded by Tom Foley
Preceded by Tom Daschle, Bill Gray, George Mitchell, Chuck Robb, Harriett Woods	Response to the State of the Union address 1987, 1988, 1989; Served alongside: Robert Byrd (1987, 1988), Lloyd Bentsen (1989)	Succeeded by Tom Foley
Preceded by Martha Collins	Permanent Chair of the Democratic National Convention; 1988	Succeeded by Ann Richards
Political offices
Preceded by Tip O'Neill	Speaker of the U.S. House of Representatives; 1987–1989	Succeeded by Tom Foley
