= Surface Freight Forwarder Deregulation Act of 1986 =

The Surface Freight Forwarder Deregulation Act of 1986, Public Law 99-521, is a federal law of the United States which eliminated federal regulation of prices, services and entry as to general commodities surface 'freight forwarders' This Act was a follow on to a sweeping program to free up competitive forces in United States transportation, most but not all of which was accomplished in the 1971-1980 period, as set out in the deregulation topic in this encyclopedia.

The bill was introduced by U.S. Senator Robert Packwood of Oregon, and was signed into law by President Ronald Reagan on October 22, 1986.

== Reasoning ==
'Freight forwarders' aggregate shipments from a variety of sources to be put on common or contract carriers for transportation. Such entities are also commonly called transportation brokers. They perform two basic economic functions. One is making matches between transport demands and transport capacity on a flexible basis, calling on whatever carriers are available at a given time and place instead of being limited to the capabilities on just one or a few carrier organizations. The second function is providing a means of aggregating, or massing, a number of small demands from different entities into shipment sizes which can be efficiently and economically transported. This capacity allows smaller shippers to obtain transport arrangements more nearly equivalent to the arrangements available to larger shippers.

The capital requirements for this service are not, usually, great. Thus, the field is open to many entrants, and can be highly competitive as among the forwarders or brokers.

In the era of close economic regulation of transportation in the United States, the interstate Commerce Commission restricted entry into the market forwarders and brokers, allowing them limited access to the transport market, and limiting substantially the extent to which they could perform the services described above.

== Law ==
This Act had the following major components

- Interstate Commerce Commission authority to regulate the prices charged by general commodities 'forwarders' and brokers was eliminated.
- Interstate Commerce Commission Authority to require a license to conduct general commodities forwarding was eliminated, making entry into this field easy.
- Interstate Commerce Commission authority to govern the contracts between general commodities forwarder (and brokers) and carriers was eliminated.

== Effects ==
The 1980 passage of the Staggers Act and the Motor Carrier Act of 1980 substantially freed up both rail and motor carrier markets. The express intent of these Acts was to make carrier transport more flexible, efficient, and competitive. By the time of passage of the Surface Freight Forwarder Deregulation Act, participants in and observers of domestic U.S. transport markets had come to a judgment that there was no need to regulate the transportation intermediaries whose functions contributed to this flexibility and efficiency, and who individually had little 'market power'.

The effect of this Act was to eliminate economic regulation of the general commodities transport forwarder sector. Limited ICC controls as to the entry and practices of household goods forwarders was retained. This regulatory authority related in substantial part to practices which individual citizen household goods shippers had found to be deceptive, rather than being heavily oriented to economic regulation.

== See also ==
- Airline Deregulation Act PL 95-50
- Freight forwarder
- Motor Carrier Act PL 96-296
- Staggers Rail Act PL 96-448

== Notes ==
- Rose, Seely and Barrett, 'The Best Transportation System in the World,'University of Ohio State Press, a part of an Historical Series on Business Enterprise, edited by Blackford and Kerr.
