= Control fraud =

Form of criminal enterprise

Control fraud occurs when a trusted person in a high position of responsibility in a company, corporation, or state subverts the organization and engages in extensive fraud for personal gain. The term "control fraud" was coined by William K. Black to refer both to the acts of fraud and to the individuals who commit them.

== Concept ==
The concept of control fraud is based on the observation that the CEO of a company is uniquely placed to remove the checks and balances on fraud within a company, such as through the use of selective hiring and firing. These tactics can position the executive in a way that allows him or her to engage in accountancy fraud and embezzle money, hide shortfalls or otherwise defraud investors, shareholders, or the public at large. A control fraud will often obtain "investments that have no readily ascertainable market value", and then shop for appraisers that will assign unrealistically high values and auditing firms that will bless the fraudulent accounting statements.

Some control frauds are reactive in the sense that they turn to fraud only after concluding that the business will fail. Opportunistic control frauds, by contrast, are attracted to a criminogenic environment where it is harder to detect fraud, e.g., as a result of deregulation.

== Examples ==
An example would be when an insolvent company publishes accounts showing massive profits. This will cause the stock to rise beyond its actual value, and those exercising the control fraud will cash in their stocks before the reality is known by others. Additionally, companies can lobby for changes to weaken the law or accompanying regulation. This can be particularly effective with large campaign contributors like Charles Keating, who with other control frauds in the United States League of Savings Institutions, was able to get his own people placed on the board of the primary regulatory agency, the Federal Home Loan Bank Board (FHLBB). With the assistance of people like Speaker of the House Jim Wright and the Keating Five, he was able to convert Lincoln Savings and Loan Association into a Ponzi scheme, making millions for himself, while suppressing the investigative and regulatory functions of the FHLBB. Eventually, the Ponzi collapsed, as all Ponzis must, but with a massive cost to the taxpayers and unsecured investors.

Control fraud can also occur in a political situation, for example by the leader of a country who can use their position to embezzle public funds and turn the country into a kleptocracy. For example, the post-Soviet republic of Azerbaijan.

Examples of control fraud include Enron, the savings and loan crisis, Sam Bankman-Fried, and Ponzi schemes such as that of Bernard Madoff.

== See also ==
- Graft (politics)
- Moral hazard
- Principal–agent problem
- Regulatory capture
