= Oscar Callaway =

American politician

Francis Oscar Callaway
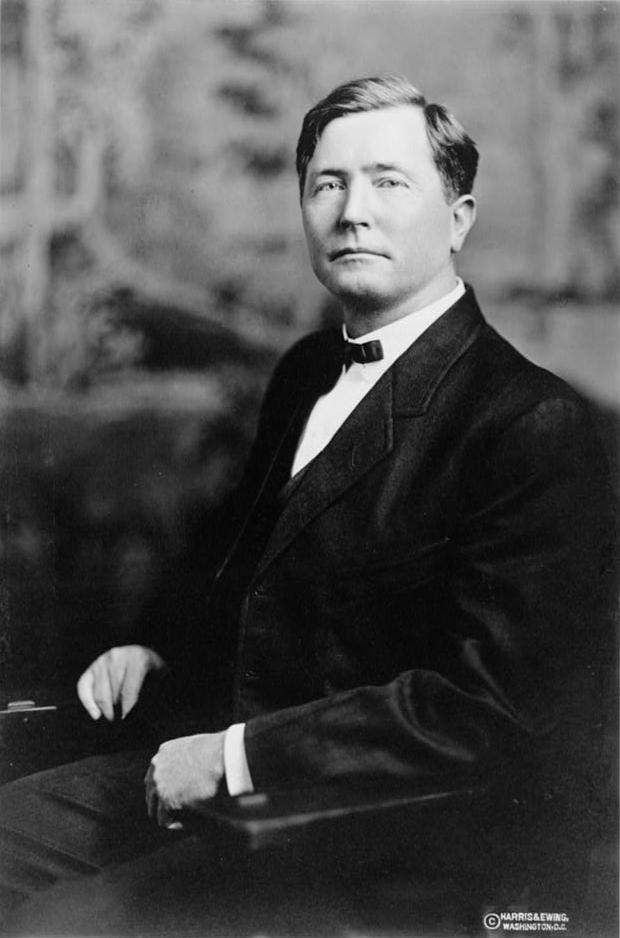

Member of the U.S. House of Representatives from Texas's Twelfth district
- In office March 4, 1911 – March 3, 1917
- Preceded by: Oscar W. Gillespie
- Succeeded by: James Clifton Wilson

Personal details
- Born: October 2, 1872 Harmony Hill (Nip-and-Tuck), Rusk County, Texas, U.S.
- Died: January 31, 1947 (aged 74) Comanche, Texas, U.S.
- Party: Democratic
- Spouse: Stella Couch
- Committees: Committee on Expenditures in the Treasury Committee on Expenditures in the Department of the Interior Naval Affairs Committee

Francis Oscar Callaway (October 2, 1872 – January 31, 1947) was a three-term U.S. Representative from Texas' twelfth district from 1911 to 1917.

== Biography ==
Born on October 2, 1872, in Harmony Hill (Nip-and-Tuck), Rusk County, Texas, Callaway moved with his parents to Comanche County in 1876. He attended the University of Texas at Austin from 1897 to 1899 and graduated from its law department in 1900. He was admitted to the bar the same year and served as prosecuting attorney of Comanche County from 1900 to 1902. On December 29, 1904, he married Stella Couch. He served as delegate to Democratic State conventions in 1896, 1898, 1900-1916, and 1920-1926.

Callaway was elected as a Democrat to the Sixty-second, Sixty-third, and Sixty-fourth Congresses, serving March 4, 1911 - March 3, 1917. He was an unsuccessful candidate for renomination in 1916.

He returned to his ranch near Comanche, Texas, where he engaged in agricultural pursuits and stock raising, and also in the practice of law in Comanche. He died in Comanche, Texas, January 31, 1947, and was interred in Oakwood Cemetery in Comanche.

== U.S. Representative, 1911-1917 ==
Callaway served on the Committee on Expenditures in the Treasury Department 1912-1913, the Committee on Expenditures in the Department of the Interior 1914-1915, and then the Naval Affairs Committee for the remainder of his incumbency. Callaway's tenure was marked by outspoken fiscal conservatism and sharp questioning of every federal expenditure. This included vigorous opposition to huge river and harbor appropriations bills such as making the Trinity and Brazos rivers navigable.

Callaway came to national attention in 1916 with his opposition to the naval appropriation bill. He believed that a civilian army could repel any invasion, that battleships had been made obsolete by submarines, and that the military expenditures called for by the Preparedness Movement unduly favored munition makers. Some of his strong words against other congressmen on the subject were expunged from the Congressional Record. In 1917 he charged that leading business interests were purchasing newspapers to advance the preparedness campaign, which led his colleague J. Hampton Moore to call for an investigation. His opposition to preparedness was a major factor in his loss of the renomination bid to James Clifton Wilson, and he retired to Comanche on March 3, 1917.

U.S. House of Representatives
Preceded by Oscar W. Gillespie	Member of the U.S. House of Representatives from Texas's 12th congressional district 1911-1917	Succeeded by James C. Wilson
