= Green Tortoise =

American tour bus company

Green Tortoise Adventure Travel
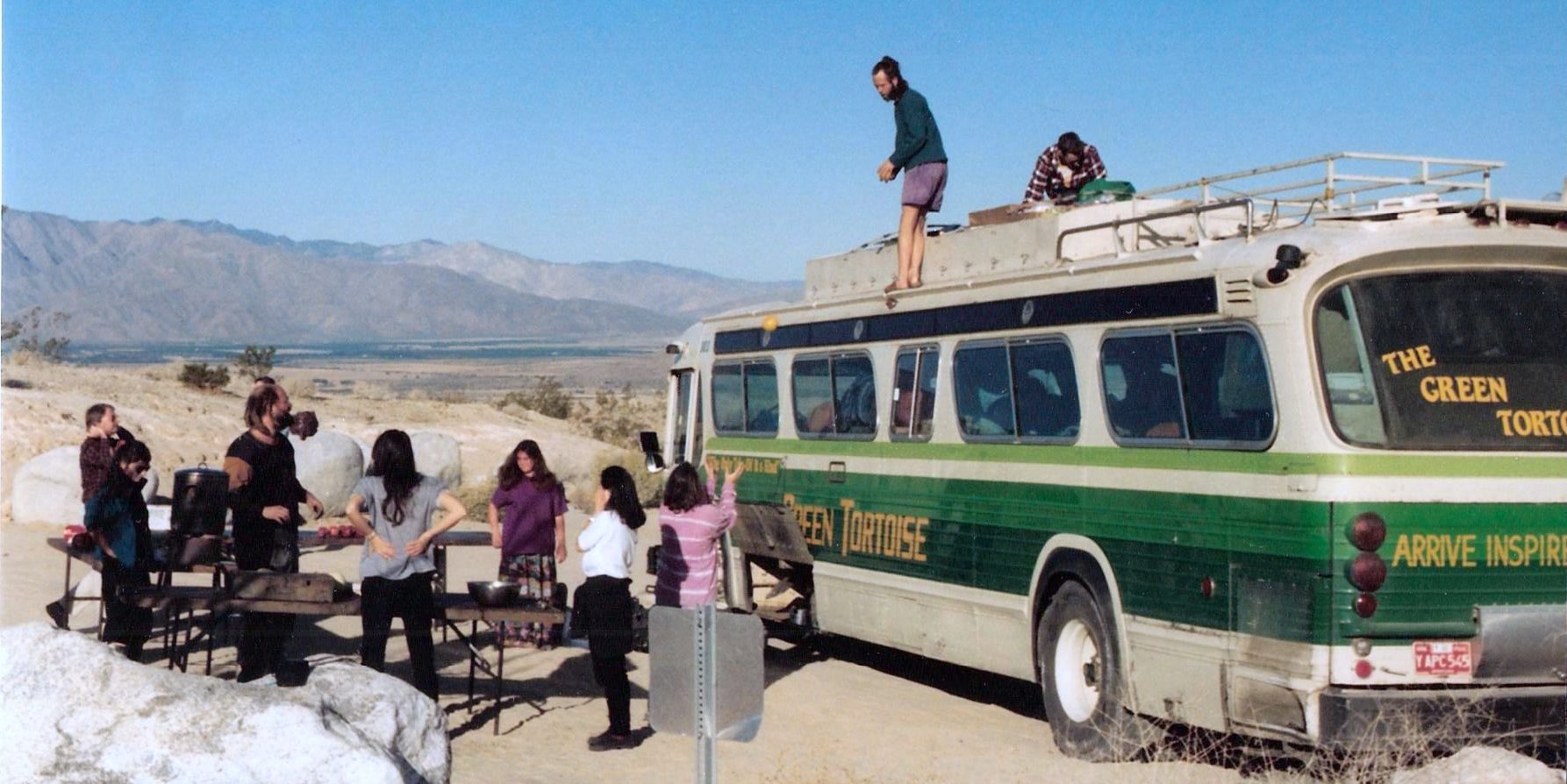
- Green Tortoise tour on a break, 1993
- Founded: 1973; 53 years ago
- Headquarters: San Francisco, California
- Service area: United States, Canada, and Mexico
- Service type: Adventure travel
- Fleet: Approx. 10 buses and motor coaches
- Website: www.greentortoise.com

Green Tortoise Adventure Travel is an American long-distance tour bus company founded by Gardner Kent in mid-1973 and based in San Francisco, California. It provides tours in North America, mostly within the United States. It operates a bus line and hostels in Seattle and San Francisco. The company caters particularly to backpackers, both from the U.S. and abroad.

== Early years ==
Green Tortoise was one of several low-cost, no-frills alternative bus companies established in the 1970s and based in California and the Pacific Northwest, providing long-distance bus service, but by 1982 it was one of only two still in operation. Also commonly referred to as "hippie bus" companies during the 1970s, for their counterculture vibe and casual atmosphere, the first such company was Grey Rabbit, which started in 1971 and was based in San Francisco. Gardner Kent founded Green Tortoise in 1973 and based its name on that of Grey Rabbit. Although the two companies were very similar, Grey Rabbit put more emphasis on making the journey time short – e.g. San Francisco to New York in less than four days – whereas Kent planned a service that would be a little slower but more relaxed, with more stops (for swimming, picnics, etc.) and where the experience of the trip itself was more important.

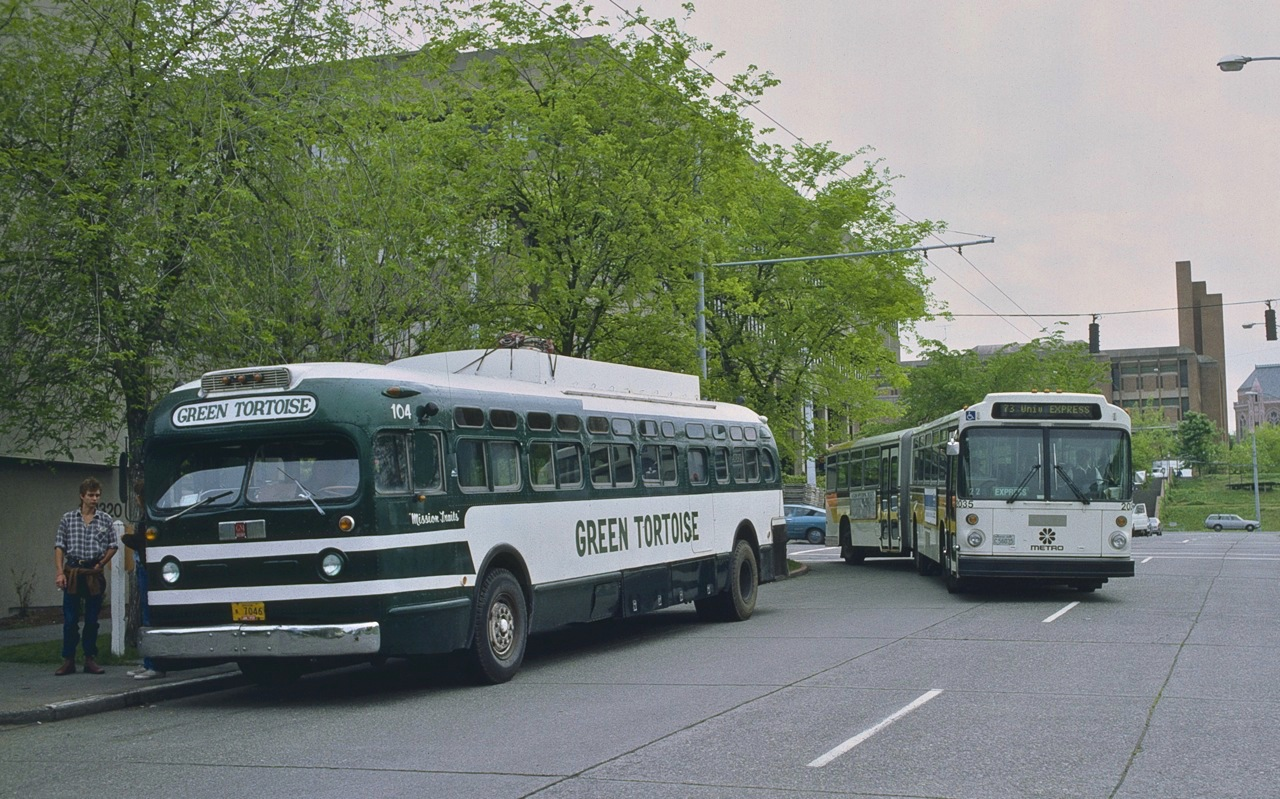
Green Tortoise bus loading in Seattle's University District, 1984

Green Tortoise's buses for its first two decades or more were secondhand transit buses built in the 1950s and modified by the removal of nearly all seats – replaced by a long foam bed in the rear two-thirds of the bus – and the installation of overhead luggage racks that could be converted into bunk beds. In a 1982 article in The Sunday Oregonian, a reporter for the Field News Service wrote that, "The hippie bus companies may have been known for speed but never comfort. Buses were old, overcrowded and prone to breakdowns – frequently stranding their generally hirsute passengers in the often highly unsympathetic hinterlands." Although the use of old buses continued, Kent made changes targeting the other problems. In 1979, Green Tortoise lengthened its cross-country journey time to seven days and began focusing more on tour bus service than on transportation. It also added trips to Mexico and Alaska.

Green Tortoise, Grey Rabbit and the smaller alternative bus companies all operated informally and without licenses for interstate operation during the 1970s. In 1981, the Tortoise and Rabbit, the only two still operating, both were granted temporary operating permits by the Interstate Commerce Commission. The subsequent passage of the federal Bus Regulatory Reform Act of 1982 eased restrictions on their operation. However, ridership on the alternative buses had been declining ever since the implementation of U.S. airline deregulation in the late 1970s, which had spawned much lower airfares. Grey Rabbit went under in 1983 and was acquired by Green Tortoise. In the early 1980s, the Tortoise's fleet still consisted of buses built in the 1950s. In 1983, the company was still operating a regular weekly service from San Francisco to Portland and San Francisco to Los Angeles, along with occasional cross-country trips, in addition to its slower-paced excursions. The company had 14 buses and 50 employees at its peak, in the late 1980s.

== Description and destinations ==
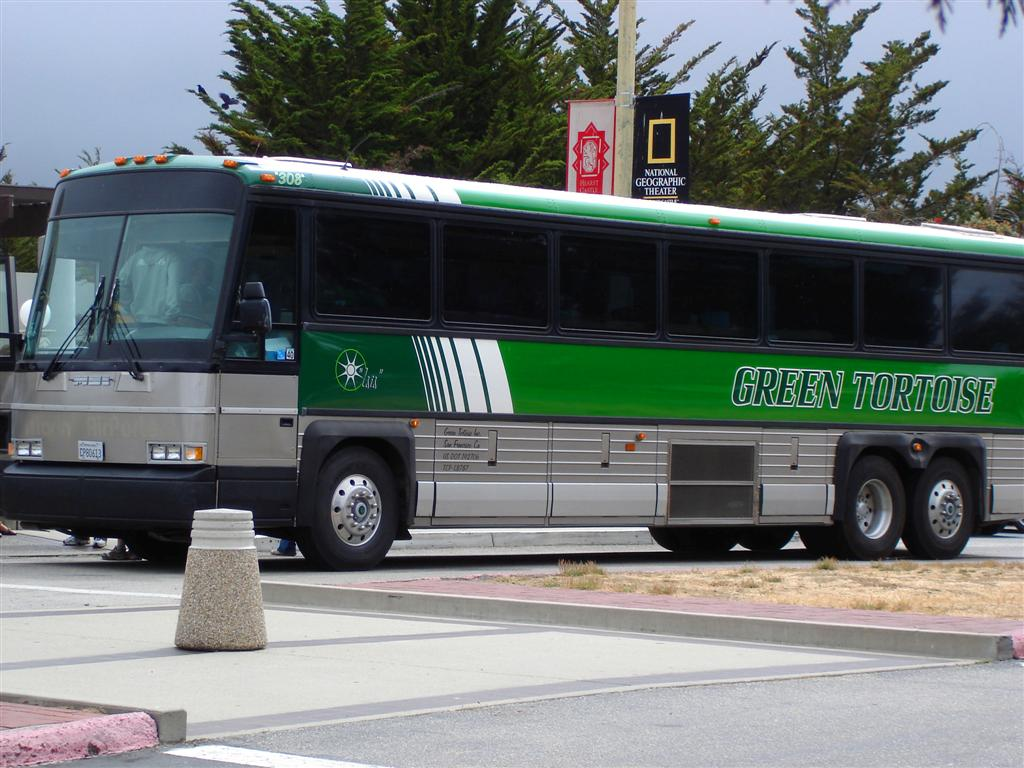
A newer Green Tortoise coach in 2007

The company's buses are fitted with bunk beds so that passengers can lounge or sleep while the bus is moving. This is done at night so that a destination can be reached in the morning. The company aims to foster a social environment among its passengers, who work together to cook most meals, which are often vegetarian. There are usually opportunities for camping during a trip. Itineraries typically try to avoid heavily touristed locations, and prioritize places of natural and cultural interest such as national parks, monuments, forests, hot springs, or archaeological ruins.

Green Tortoise has historically made trips to destinations in the United States including Alaska and regular summer coast-to-coast routes from San Francisco to Boston and back. Special trips are also arranged to festivals every year, including a Mardi Gras trip to New Orleans, the Oregon Country Fair and Burning Man, where they also operate a shuttle bus from the event into nearby Gerlach and Empire, Nevada. Trips outside the U.S. have included Mexico (including the Yucatán Peninsula and the Baja California Peninsula), Guatemala, Belize, and Canada. The company discontinued its regularly scheduled service between San Francisco and Seattle via Eugene and Portland in 2001, in favor of focusing on "adventure camping trips".

In 1992, the company's annual revenue was around $1.4 million. It had 50 employees and a fleet of 10 buses at that time, with a bus-renovation garage in Lowell, Oregon. In 2004, the fleet was still mostly made up of 1950s ex-Greyhound buses and 1960s ex-transit buses, but at least one or two new 1990s highway coaches had been added.

== Hostels ==
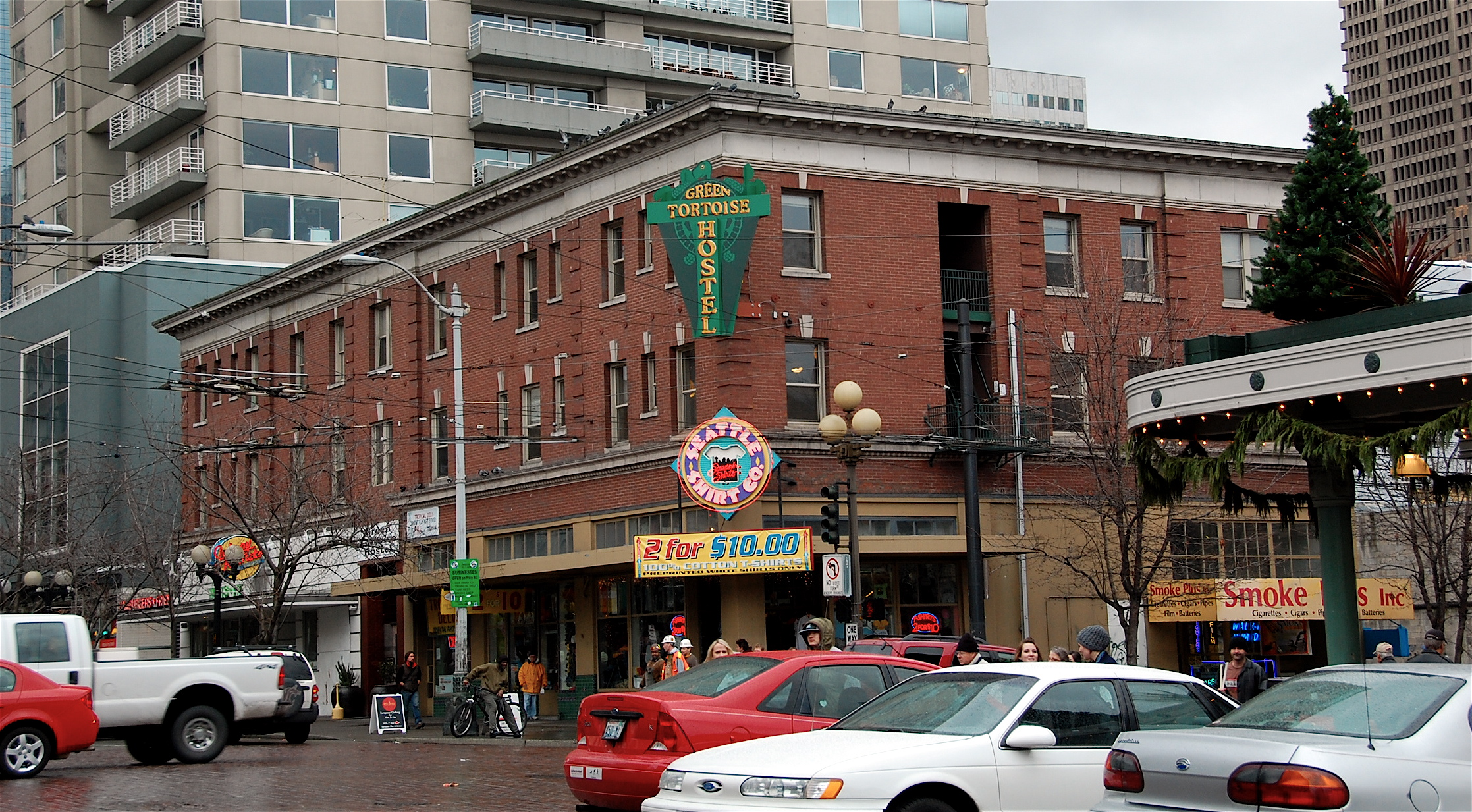
The Seattle Green Tortoise Hostel, at its post-2006 location

Since the mid-1990s, Green Tortoise has also operated two hostels. The first one opened in Seattle in 1993 and the second in San Francisco in 1994. The Seattle hostel was originally located in the Queen Anne neighborhood, but moved in 1997 to a location on Second Avenue in downtown Seattle, taking over the former Forest Hotel after a year of remodeling. That building was demolished in 2006, and the hostel moved to a different location in downtown Seattle, on Pike Street, across from the Pike Place Market.

According to The Seattle Times, Hostelworld.com named Green Tortoise's Seattle hostel one of the top ten hostels in North America in its 2009 annual awards.

== See also ==
- Backpacking (travel)

== Bibliography ==
- Wilkinson, Kelly (June 21, 1998). "It was, like, real; Green Tortoise tours deliver intimate views – of your fellow travelers". The Washington Post. p. E01.
- "Tortoise on a desert run: relive the days when getting there was half the fun". (Green Tortoise bus tours) T. Kelly Rossiter. Vegetarian Times, Sept 1995, n217 p92(3)
- La Ganga, Maria L. (Sept. 19, 1995). "Hip Trips on the Magic Bus : Cheap and freewheeling, the Green Tortoise is a survivor of another era. Think of it as a rolling encounter group. And bring your sleeping bag." Los Angeles Times. p. A01+
- "A 1990's road trip worthy of Kerouac". (Green Tortoise bus tours) Lynda Edwards. The New York Times, November 14, 1993, v143 s9 pV8(L) col 1 (43 col in)
- "A day camp on the road". (Green Tortoise offers travel and living in a bus) Eric Hubler. The New York Times, March 8, 1992, v141 s5 pXX41(N) pXX41(L) col 1 (27 col in)
- "Trip on the Tortoise can be hair-raising if you aren't hip; rolling remnant of the 1960s, a bus unlike Greyhound, still plies the West Coast". (Green Tortoise, a gypsy bus line) Bill Richards. The Wall Street Journal Western Edition, January 14, 1991, pA1(W) pA1(E) col 4 (29 col in)
- "Touring with Green Tortoise; this California-based company offers the ultimate in adventure travel by motorcoach". (Green Tortoise Tours) (Focus: Group Travel) Susan O'Gorman. Travel Weekly, March 31, 1987, v46 p54(3)
