= William K. Black =

Professor of law and economics at UMKC

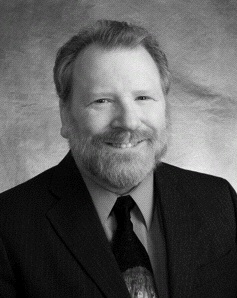

Personal details
- Born: William Kurt Black; September 6, 1951 (age 74) Dearborn, Michigan, U.S.
- Education: University of Michigan, Ann Arbor; University of California, Irvine

William Kurt Black (born September 6, 1951) is an American lawyer, academic, author, and a former bank regulator. Black's expertise is in white-collar crime, public finance, regulation, and other topics in law and economics. He developed the concept of "control fraud", in which a business or national executive uses the entity he or she controls as a "weapon" to commit fraud.

== Background ==
Black earned a J.D. from the University of Michigan Law School and a Ph.D. from the University of California, Irvine. Black is currently an associate professor of Economics and Law at the University of Missouri-Kansas City in the Department of Economics and the School of Law. He was the executive director of the Institute for Fraud Prevention from 2005 to 2007 and previously taught at the LBJ School of Public Affairs at the University of Texas, and at Santa Clara University.

Black was litigation director for the Federal Home Loan Bank Board (FHLBB) from 1984 to 1986, deputy director of the Federal Savings and Loan Insurance Corporation (FSLIC) in 1987, and Senior VP and the General Counsel of the Federal Home Loan Bank of San Francisco from 1987 to 1989, which regulated some of the largest thrift banks in the U.S.

== Savings and loan scandal ==
Black was a central figure in exposing Congressional corruption during the Savings and Loan Crisis. He took the notes during the Keating Five meeting that were later published in the press, and brought the event to national attention and a congressional investigation.

According to Bill Moyers,

The former Director of the Institute for Fraud Prevention now teaches Economics and Law at the University of Missouri, Kansas City. During the savings and loan crisis, it was Black who accused then-house speaker Jim Wright and five US Senators, including John Glenn and John McCain, of doing favors for the S&L's in exchange for contributions and other perks. The senators got off with a slap on the wrist, but so enraged was one of those bankers, Charles Keating — after whom the senate's so-called "Keating Five" were named — he sent a memo that read, in part, 'get Black — kill him dead.' Metaphorically, of course. Of course.

== 2008 financial crisis ==
=== Bill Moyers Journal appearances ===
On April 3, 2009, Black appeared on Bill Moyers Journal on PBS and provided critical commentary on the 2008 financial crisis. Black asserted that the 2008 financial crisis was essentially caused by a big Ponzi scheme; that the "liar loans" and other financial tricks were essentially illegal frauds; and that the triple-A ratings given to these loans was part of a criminal cover-up. He said that the "Prompt Corrective Action Law" passed after the Savings and loan crisis mandated that ailing banks should be put into receivership. Black also stated that trying to hide how bad the situation is will simply prolong the problem, as happened in Japan and resulted in Japan's lost decade. Black stated that Timothy Geithner was engaged in a cover-up, and that the administration did not want people to understand what went wrong or how bad the banking situation was. On April 23, 2010, Black was again interviewed by Moyers to update the public's understanding of the 2008 financial crisis.

=== Testimony before Congress on the bankruptcy of Lehman Brothers ===
On April 20, 2010, Black testified before the House Financial Services Committee in a hearing titled "Public Policy Issues Raised by the Report of the Lehman Bankruptcy Examiner." He testified about the role that Alt-A mortgages, what he called "liars' loans," on residential real estate played in the downfall of Lehman Brothers. His testimony was that "Lehman's failure is a story in large part of fraud. And it is fraud that begins at the absolute latest in 2001, and that is with their subprime and liars' loan operations." As explained in his prepared statement, his reference was to Aurora Loan Services, Inc., which was a subsidiary of Lehman: "Lehman's principal source of (fictional) income and real losses was making (and selling) what the trade accurately called 'liar's loans' through its subsidiary, Aurora. (The bland euphemism for liar's loans was 'Alt-A.') Liar's loans are 'criminogenic' (they create epidemics of mortgage fraud) because they create strong incentives to provide false information on loan applications."

On the same page in his prepared testimony Black referenced an article from the Denver Post dated September 16, 2008, the day after Lehman filed for bankruptcy. The article reported on the uncertain fate of Aurora Loan Services, which was based nearby, and quoted Lehman's chief financial officer as saying the previous week that, "The majority of our write-downs were in Alt-A driven by an increase in.. . delinquencies and loss expectations." The article also said that Lehman was "among the first of its peers to originate home loans and securitize them for sale across the globe, and it fueled the growth of the Alt-A loan."

=== Testimony before Irish Banking Inquiry ===
Black was invited to testify before the Irish parliament's banking inquiry in February 2015. In his testimony, he described the broad September 2008 Irish bank guarantee as "the most destructive own goal in history".

== Works ==
- "The U.S. Banking Industry in Transition in Real World Banking", eds. Dan Fireside & Amy Gluckman (Dollars & Sense 2008)
- "When Fragile Become Friable: Endemic Control Fraud as a Cause of Economic Stagnation and Collapse", White Collar Crimes: a Debate, K. Naga Srivalli, ed., Hyderabad, India, The Icfai University Press (2007: 162–178)
- "Corruption Kills", International Handbook of White-Collar Crime, Henry Pontell & G. Geis eds. (Springer 2007)
- "Control fraud v. the protocols", Crime, Law & Social Change, 45(3) (April 2006: 241–258)
- Black, William K. (2013). The Best Way to Rob a Bank is to Own One: How Corporate Executives and Politicians Looted the S&L Industry (Updated ed.). University of Texas Press. ISBN 978-0-292-75418-8.
- Black, William K. (December 2005). "'Control frauds' as financial super-predators: How 'pathogens' make financial markets inefficient" (PDF). Journal of Socio-Economics. 34 (6): 734–755. doi:10.1016/j.socec.2005.07.026.
- "Control Fraud as an Explanation for White-Collar Crime Waves: The Case of the Savings & Loan Debacle", Crime, Law and Social Change 43(1) (February 2005: 1-29)
- "The Dango Tango: Why Corruption Blocks Real Reform in Japan", Business Ethics Quarterly 14(4) (October 2004: 602–623)
- "The Imperium Strikes Back: The Need to Teach Socioeconomics to Law Students", San Diego Law Review, No. 1 (Winter 2004: 231–256)
- "Beware of Geeks Bearing Gifts: Enron Uses Its High Tech Information System to Defraud", CISIC 2003 Conference Symposium (McGraw-Hill 2003)
- "Re-examining the Law & Economics Theory of Corporate Governance", Challenge 46(2) (March/April 2003: 22–40)
- "A Tale of Two Crises", Kravis Leadership Institute Leadership Review, fall 2002
- "Why do the Non-Heathens Rage?", Journal of Criminal Justice and Popular Culture, 8(3) (2001: 225–276)
- "The Savings and Loan Debacle of the 1980's: White-Collar Crime or Risky Business?" (with K. Calavita & H. Pontell) Law and Policy 17(1) (January 1995: 23–55)
- '"Ending Our Forebearers' Forbearances: FIRREA and Supervisory Goodwill", Stanford Law & Policy Review 102 (Spring 1990)
- Black, William K. (March 2009). "Those Who Forget the Regulatory Successes of the Past are Condemned to Failure". Economic & Political Weekly. XLIV (13): 80–86. SSRN 1536531.
- Black, William K. (May 25, 2011). "The Two Documents Everyone Should Read to Better Understand the Crisis". HuffPost.
- Black, William K. (May 25, 2011). "How the Servant Became a Predator: Finance's Five Fatal Flaws". HuffPost.
