= Grey Rabbit =

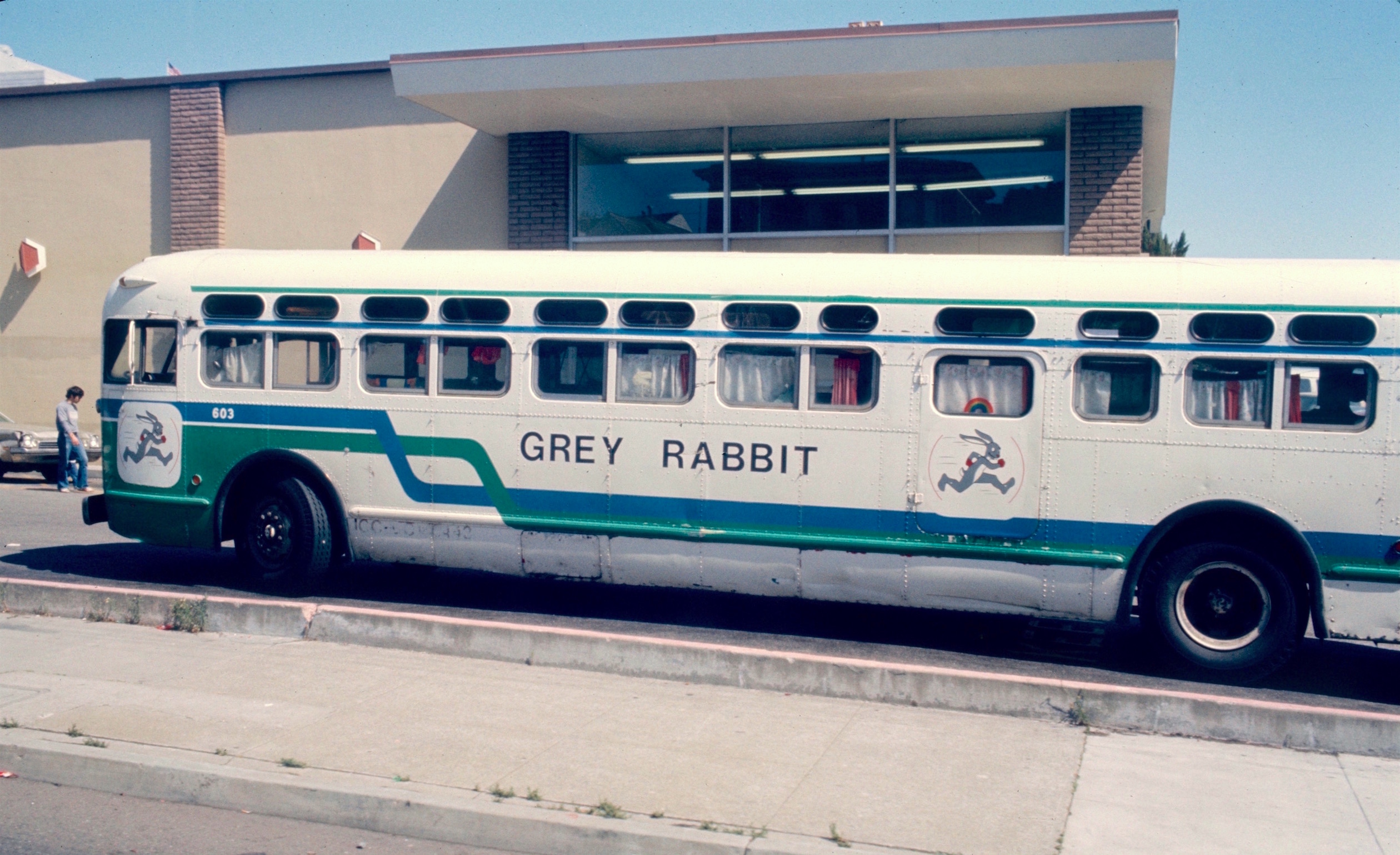
- A Grey Rabbit bus in San Francisco, 1982
- Founded: 1971
- Ceased operation: 1983 (acquired by Green Tortoise)
- Headquarters: San Francisco, California
- Service type: Passenger transportation
- Chief executive: Lester Rall (founder)

Grey Rabbit, also known as Grey Rabbit Camper Tours, was an American company based in the San Francisco Bay Area that operated long-distance bus service from 1971 to 1983. It was one of a few small, long-distance bus companies established in the U.S. in the 1970s that specialized in inexpensive, no-frills, cross-country bus service using old secondhand buses and attracting counterculture passengers. It was the first, and was also the biggest, best-known, and "most successful" of them in its first several years. A Washington Post columnist in 1978 referred to Grey Rabbit as "the granddaddy" of the five such "alternative" bus companies existing at that time, also known as "underground" bus companies and "hippie bus" companies. It operated mainly in two areas: between California and the Pacific Northwest and on a cross-country route between San Francisco and New York. Green Tortoise, which was established in 1973 and named after Grey Rabbit, became Grey Rabbit's main competition in the small field, and eventually bought it out.

== History ==
Founded in 1971 by Lester Rall (born c.1940) with a single Volkswagen bus, the service was originally known as the Traveling Magical Universe and operated only along the Pacific Coast. Rall eventually named the service Grey Rabbit, which one writer described as "a reference to the animal used as 'bait' in dog races, a wry allusion to [Rall's] relationship with the Greyhound Bus Company". Another writer said the name was chosen so that it would appear "next to Greyhound in the phone book".

In 1972, Rall acquired an old school bus and, in 1973, three secondhand Greyhound buses. By that time, Grey Rabbit had established regular weekly cross-country service between San Francisco and New York, with the New York trips subsequently being extended to Boston. Regular service also operating between the Bay Area and Portland, Seattle and Vancouver, B.C., Canada. Within a few years, the company's fleet of buses had grown to 10. A handful of similar but smaller "alternative bus" companies were launched in the 1970s, based on Grey Rabbit's example, and they were sometimes collectively referred to as "Grey Rabbits". Typically operating without a commercial license and often with just a single bus, their names included The Lame Duck, Blue Goose, The Red Bus and the Iron Pony. All but Grey Rabbit and Green Tortoise were out of business by 1982.

The buses that provided the service were old, secondhand transit buses or highway coaches that were modified inside, with almost all passenger seats removed and replaced by beds. They lacked bathrooms. In 1977, the schedule included two San Francisco–New York–Boston trips per week in each direction, and the journey took three or four days. There were weekly departures from the Bay Area north to Vancouver, B.C., and south to Los Angeles. As of 1977, the company had four ticket outlets in the Bay Area. In addition to its low fares, about half those of Greyhound, another feature that attracted some riders was the casual atmosphere found on the Grey Rabbit and other "hippie bus" lines of the 1970s, in which conversation and interaction between riders who were strangers before boarding was welcomed in a way not commonly seen on conventional long-distance bus services.

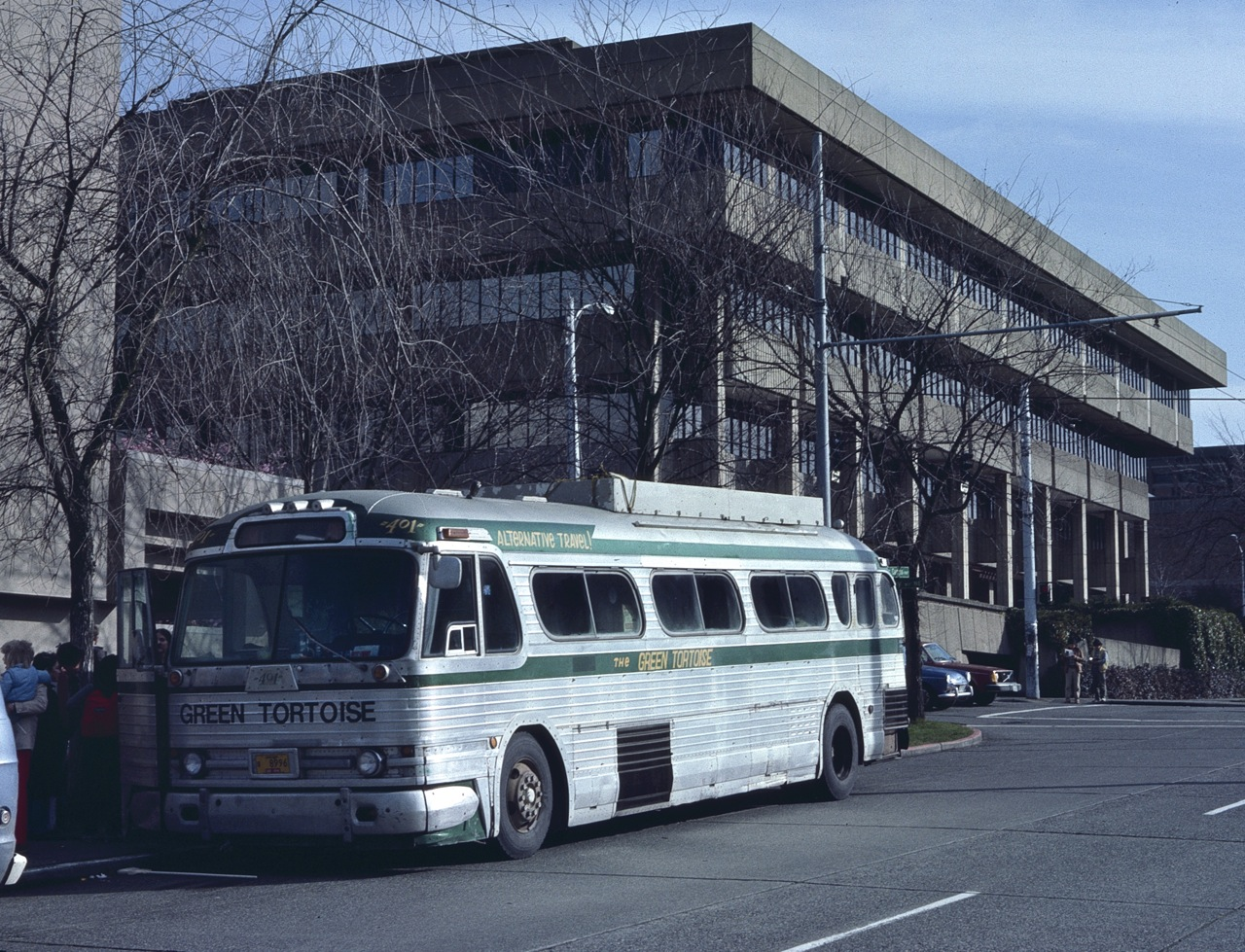
A Green Tortoise bus, Grey Rabbit's main competitor, loading in the University District in Seattle in 1984

For its first 10 years, Grey Rabbit operated without having a license from the Interstate Commerce Commission (ICC) permitting interstate operation—"in violation of the law, a sort of 'guerilla Greyhound'", a reporter for the Eugene Register-Guard wrote. In 1976, the San Francisco Examiner wrote that Grey Rabbit "and five or six other alternative bus operators ... have kept a safe jump or two ahead of the Interstate Commerce Commission, local authorities and the bus companies – Greyhound and Trailways – who represent everything the Grey Rabbits and their passengers don't". The Register-Guard wrote that Rall employed various tactics to avoid trouble with authorities, such as "schooling passengers to say they were friends on an outing rather than riders on a for-hire bus" or "creating the Church of World Community Consciousness, selling the buses to the church, ordaining the drivers as 'ministers' and calling the fares 'donations'." The Church of World Community Consciousness was recognized only in Oregon. Chief competitor Green Tortoise was also operating without a license from the ICC at that time, doing so for its first seven years, until obtaining a license in 1981.

In June 1981, the ICC granted Grey Rabbit a temporary permit, and Lester Rall attempted to obtain a permanent one. Meanwhile, in 1981, the company was operating only between San Francisco and Seattle, no longer cross-country, and its fleet of buses numbered five, all about 25 years old. Grey Rabbit was based in Berkeley, California, at that time. Its fare for a trip between San Francisco and Eugene was $35, which was only half the price that mainstream carriers Greyhound and Trailways were charging for the same trip at that time. Federal deregulation of long-distance bus service in 1982 reduced or removed the remaining restrictions on the company's ability to operate legally.

The U.S. deregulation of airlines that was put into effect in the late 1970s led to major reductions in prices for air travel. Grey Rabbit and similar companies were unable to compete, even for low-budget travelers. Keeping the elderly buses running was also an ongoing challenge. Grey Rabbit ceased operation in 1983, and was acquired by Green Tortoise, who also acquired the rights to the name (but did not use them).

== See also ==
- Backpacking (travel)
- Counterculture of the 1960s
