= Natural Gas Choice =

Natural Gas Choice programs in United States of America allow residential consumers and other small volume gas users to purchase natural gas from someone other than their traditional utility company. With Natural Gas Choice programs, customers can either purchase from their natural gas utility or choose to receive their gas supply from non-utility suppliers. Large commercial and industrial consumers have had the option of purchasing the natural gas commodity separately from natural gas services for many years.

== Natural Gas Choice ==
=== Overview ===
Currently, 21 States and the District of Columbia have legislation or existing programs that allow Natural Gas Choice Programs. Enrollment in “customer choice” programs increased in 2008 for the third year in a row. Overall, more than 13 percent or about 4.7 million of the approximately 35 million residential natural gas consumers with access to choice were buying natural gas from marketers as of December 2008. The availability and characteristics of these customer choice programs vary widely from state to state. Currently the states of Georgia and Ohio have the highest percentage of customer participation in Natural Gas Choice programs with 81.5 percent and 42.3 percent of customers participating in Natural Gas Choice Programs respectively. New York and New Jersey, on the other hand, have customer participation rates of 17.1 percent and 3.1 percent respectively, despite full implementation of Natural Gas Choice Programs.

=== Georgia ===
Georgia is the state with the highest participation percentage in Natural Gas Choice programs. In 1999 all Georgia customers became eligible to participate in Natural Gas Choice. At one time 19 natural gas suppliers were approved to supply gas to natural gas customers. However, by 2002, 90% of Georgia residents were served by 3 or fewer marketers. In 2007, Georgia had 1,793,650 residential and 127,835 commercial customers. They consumed approximately 112 and 49 billion cubic feet of natural gas, respectively.

=== Ohio ===
Ohio has had Natural Gas Choice since 1997. More than 40 percent of the state's residential natural gas customers were participating in choice programs as of September 2008. Several major Ohio natural gas utilities in Ohio have plans to exit the function of supplying natural gas to customers, leaving the gas supply function to independent natural gas supply companies. In 2007, Ohio had 3,273,791 residential, 272,548 commercial, and 6,865 industrial customers. They consumed approximately 300, 159, and 295 billion cubic feet of natural gas, respectively. Currently, Ohio has 35 natural gas suppliers certified to participate in Natural Gas Choice programs.
