= Bus Regulatory Reform Act =

Deregulation of bus industry in 1982

Bus Regulatory Reform Act of 1982
- Long title: To amend subtitle IV of title 49, United States Code, to provide for more effective regulation of motor carriers of passengers.

Legislative history
- Introduced in the House as H.R. 3663, Bus Regulatory Reform Act, 1982 by Glenn M. Anderson (D–CA) on May 21, 1981; Passed the House on November 19, 1981; Passed the Senate on June 30, 1982; Signed into law by President Ronald Reagan on September 20, 1982

The Bus Regulatory Reform Act of 1982 (Pub. L. 97–261, 96 Stat. 1102) was signed into law by President Ronald Reagan on September 20, 1982. The law contained provisions considered "deregulatory" of the bus industry, representing the largest legislation of regulatory reform since 1935.

On signing the bill into law, Reagan stated:

"One of the basic policies of my administration is that private enterprise should be as private as possible—guided by the market judgments of business managers rather than by the dictates of government regulators. Enactment of this legislation is a significant milestone in our efforts to deregulate one of our country's most vital economic sectors, the surface transportation industry."

— Ronald Reagan, Gerhard Peters and John T. Woolley, The American Presidency Project. http://www.presidency.ucsb.edu/ws/index.php?pid=43014

== Law ==
The bill included reducing restrictions on bus lines to add or remove stops, and increasing ease of entry of entrepreneurs into the bus service market. As such, authority could be granted to any "fit, willing, and able" carrier unless a protestant could show the new authority was contrary to public interest. The bill provided the Interstate Commerce Commission could investigate or suspend rates considered discriminatory or predatory. It could also overrule state regulatory authorities on intrastate "rate and exit issues" if state rulings caused "undue burdens" on interstate commerce.

Following the enactment of the new law, the Interstate Commerce Commission received over 2000 applications to operate new bus services. However, the rate of service loss was not substantially different from that observed prior to passage.

Supporters of the Act consider it "beneficial in improving the economic efficiency of carriers", while "some minor reservations" exist "regarding its adverse effects on smaller towns and rural areas". Those most affected by the bill were union bus drivers as the deregulation of the industry allowed for new, non-union workers to flood the market and decrease wages across the board, leading in 1983 to the Greyhound Bus Line Strikes which lasted several weeks nationally.

== See also ==
- Intercity buses in the United States

== Bibliography ==
- William E. Thoms – Unleashing the Greyhounds – The Bus Regulatory Reform Act of 1982, Campbell Law Review. Volume 6, Issue 1, article 4.
