= Industrial licensing in India =

In India, there are some regulations and restrictions with regard to establishing industries in certain categories. This is done by making it mandatory to obtain licenses before setting up such an industry.

== List of industries with compulsory licensing ==
=== Industrial licensing is compulsory for the following industries ===
1. Large and Medium Industries: Items reserved for the Small Scale Sector
2. All Industries:
  1. All items of electronic aerospace and defense equipment, whether specifically mentioned or not in this list.
  2. All items related to the production or use of atomic energy including the carrying out of any process, preparatory or ancillary to such production or use, under the Atomic Energy Act, 1962.

== Comprehensive list of industry (where industrial licensing is compulsory) ==
1. Coal and lignite
2. Petroleum (other than crude) and its distillation products.
3. Distillation and brewing of alcoholic drinks
4. Sugar
5. Animal fats and oils, partly or wholly hydrogenated
6. Cigars and cigarettes of tobacco and manufactured tobacco substitutes
7. Asbestos and asbestos based products
8. Plywood, decorative veneers, and other wood-based products such as particle board, medium density fiber board, and black-board
9. Raw hides and skins, leather chamois and patent leather
10. Tanned or dressed furskins
11. Motor cars
12. Paper and Newsprint except bagasse-based units (i.e. except units based on minimum 75% pulp from agricultural residues, bagasse and other non conventional raw materials)
13. Electronic aerospace and defence equipment: all types
14. Explosives including detonating fuses, safety fuses, gunpowder, nitrocellulose and matches
15. Hazardous chemicals
16. Drugs and Pharmaceuticals (according to Drug Policy)
17. Entertainment electronics (VCR, Color TV, CD player, tape recorder)
18. White goods (domestic refrigerators, domestic dishwashing machines, programmable domestic washing machines, microwave ovens, air conditioners)

== See also ==
- License Raj
