= 2013 Shuqualak tornado =

Tornado in Mississippi and Alabama, US

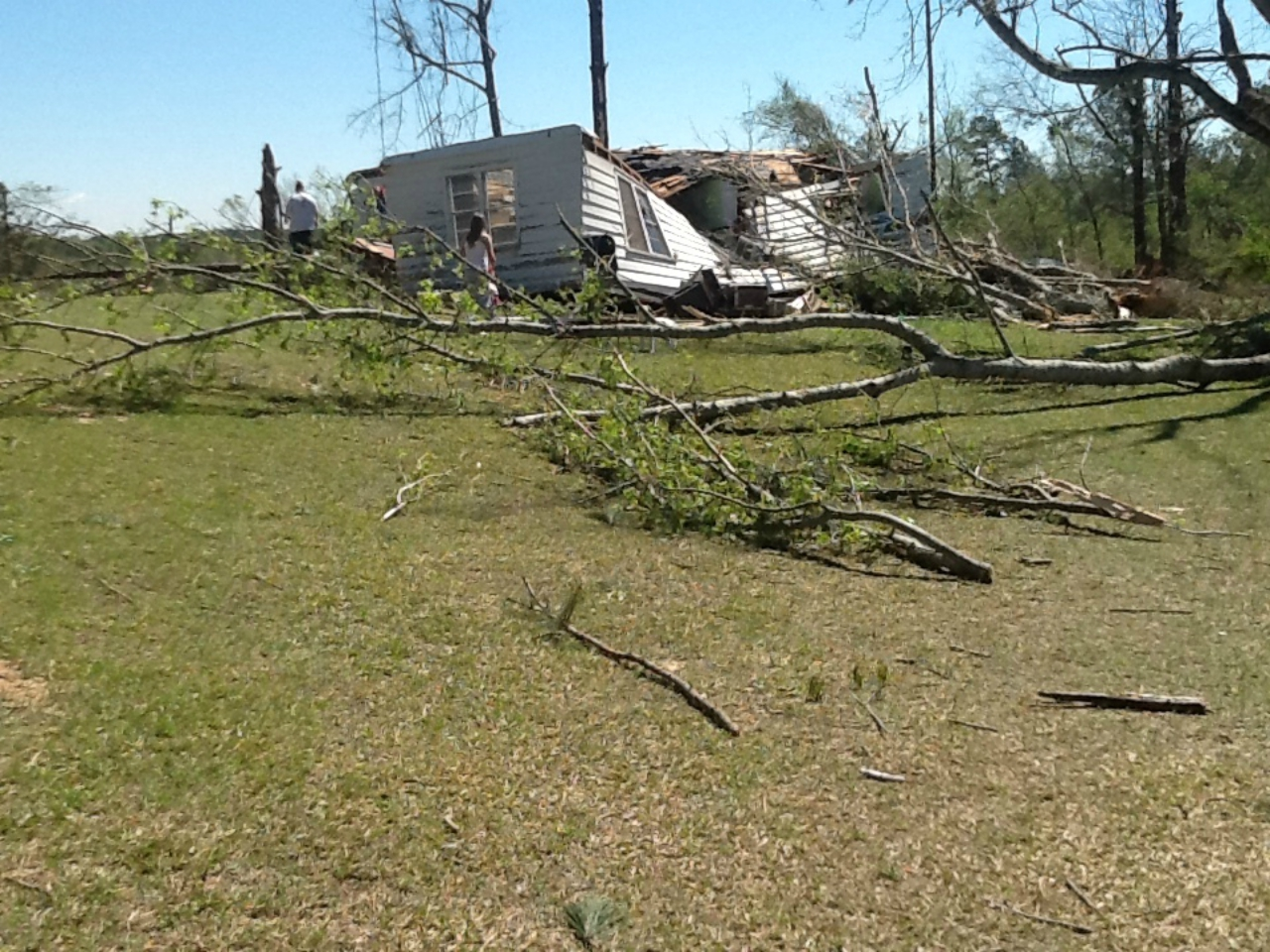
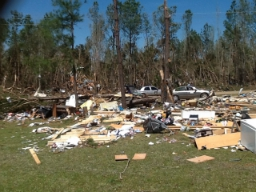
- Right to left: The tornado as it crossed through Prairie Point, a house leveled at EF3 intensity, damage to a Mobile home

Meteorological history
- Formed: April 11, 2013, 12:33 PM CST (UTC–06:00)
- Dissipated: April 11, 2013, 1:48 PM CST (UTC–06:00)
- Duration: 1 hour, 15 minutes

EF3 tornado
- on the Enhanced Fujita scale
- Max width: 1,320 yd (0.75 mi; 1.21 km)
- Path length: 68.4 mi (110.1 km)
- Highest winds: 145 mph (233 km/h)

Overall effects
- Fatalities: 1
- Injuries: 9
- Damage: Unknown (Note: https://apps.dat.noaa.gov/stormdamage/damageviewer/ noted 99.00 in records.)
- Areas affected: Mississippi, particularly Kemper and Noxubee Counties, with a small portion in Alabama
- Part of Tornadoes of 2013

On April 11, 2013, an intense tornado struck portions of Kemper County and Noxubee County in Mississippi and Pickens County, Alabama. The tornado was on the ground for 68.4 miles (110.1 km), killing one person and injuring nine. The tornado crossed 68.4 miles in 1 hour and 15 minutes. The tornado touched down about 3.4 miles (5.5 km) northeast from Herbert Springs. It continued northeast passing Damascus about 1.6 miles (2.6 km) west. It continued northeast before causing significant damage to Bloomfield and Shuqualak. After crossing trough forests and fields, it hit McLeod and Prairie Point, before continuing and impacting Bigbee Valley at EF1 intensity. It crossed into Alabama and dissipated.

The tornado caused significant damage to crops and buildings, and killed one and injured 9 others.

== Meteorological synopsis ==
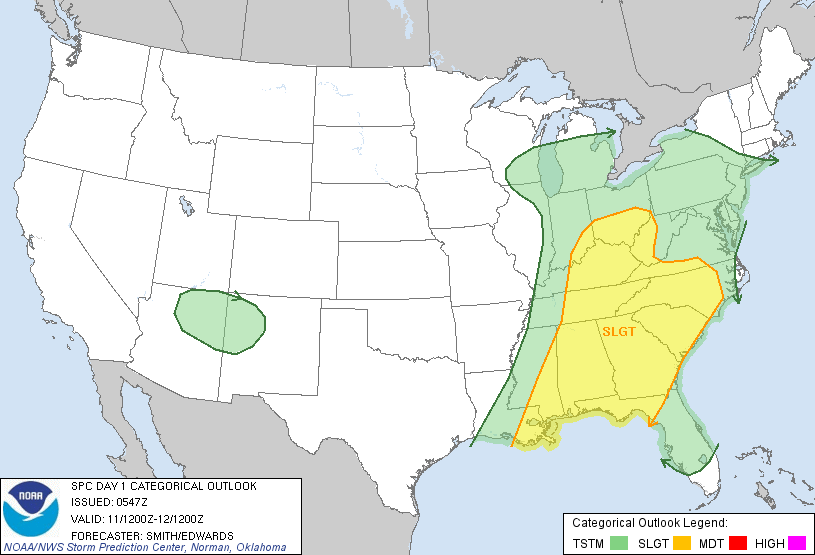
The outlook for day one.

On April 11, 2013, The NWS outlined a slight risk for severe weather across the southeast/east portions of the United States. Inside of this, a 5% risk for tornadoes streched from eastern Louisiana to south Virginia. The NWS noted that a few tornadoes were possible through the afternoon, with wind being the primary threat.

On April 10, a warm and unstable air mass covered the region, with temperatures reaching the mid-to-upper 80s. A slow-moving cold front advanced through Texas and into Louisiana during the day, triggering tornadic activity in parts of central Arkansas near Little Rock. Preceding the squall line, isolated thunderstorm development resulted in hail across portions of northeast Louisiana. Due to the lack of a strong synoptic push, the front stalled west of the Mississippi River throughout the evening and overnight hours of April 10–11.

The cold front and associated squall line finally shifted eastward early on April 11. Across eastern Mississippi, temperatures remained warm, and atmospheric conditions stayed sufficiently unstable to support the development of severe weather. A storm fired around 11:00 AM (CST) and would form a funnel shortly thereafter.

== Tornado summary ==
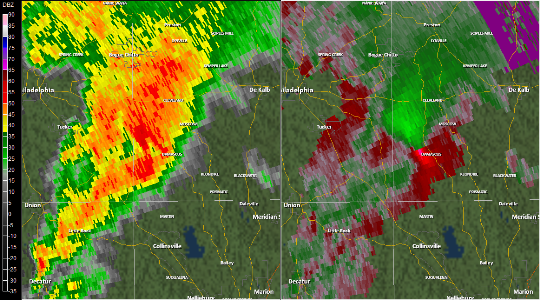
Radar scan of the tornado south-west of De Kalb, Mississippi.

At around 12:33 PM (CST), a tornado touched down about 3.4 miles (5.5 km) northeast of Herbert Springs. The tornado would travel northeastward crossing Okatibbee Creek inflicting tree damage. The tornado would continue causing tree damage across Tallachula Creek. It would cause more intense damage near Moscow, where EF2 damage would be inflicted. The first EF3 damage occurred north of Moscow when a steel frame commercial building along highway 493 was hit by the tornado, Where one man would die. The tornado would continue on due northeast, inflicting severe damage to trees. It would cause EF2 damage in Bloomfield, before continuing through fields. It would then strike a gas station west of Shuqualak, as well as several other buildings.

After continuing on, it would reach a peak width of 3/4 mile (1.2 km) wide near Prairie Point. It destroyed a metal transmission tower here. After crossing through Ravine, it would cross over Lake Aliceville into Alabama. It would significantly weaken, only causing EF1 damage in Alabama. After travelling 12 miles, it would lift off the ground and dissipate leading to debris fallout.

== Aftermath ==
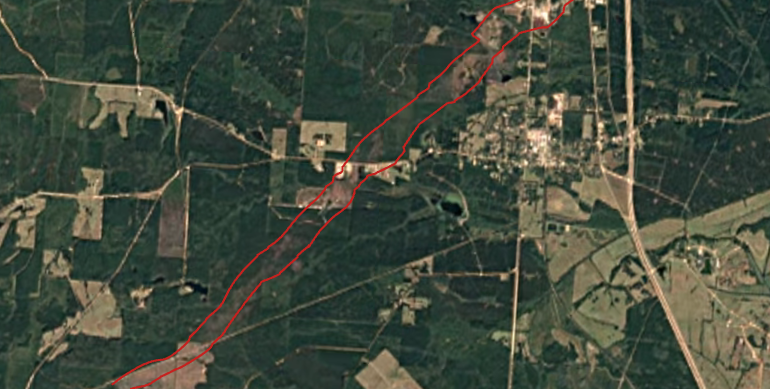
Scour of the tornado

Following the National Weather Service's assessment, the tornado was officially rated as an EF3 in Mississippi and an EF1 in Alabama, with peak wind speeds estimated at 145 mph (233 km/h). Mississippi Governor Phil Bryant declared a state of emergency for Kemper and Noxubee counties due to the impacts of the tornado.

=== Deaths ===
There was one death, a male in a manufacturing building.

Name	age	where	Ref.
Carlos Madrigal	28	Kemper	

== See also ==
- 2013 Hattiesburg tornado - another strong tornado from this year.
