= Tornadoes of 2013 =

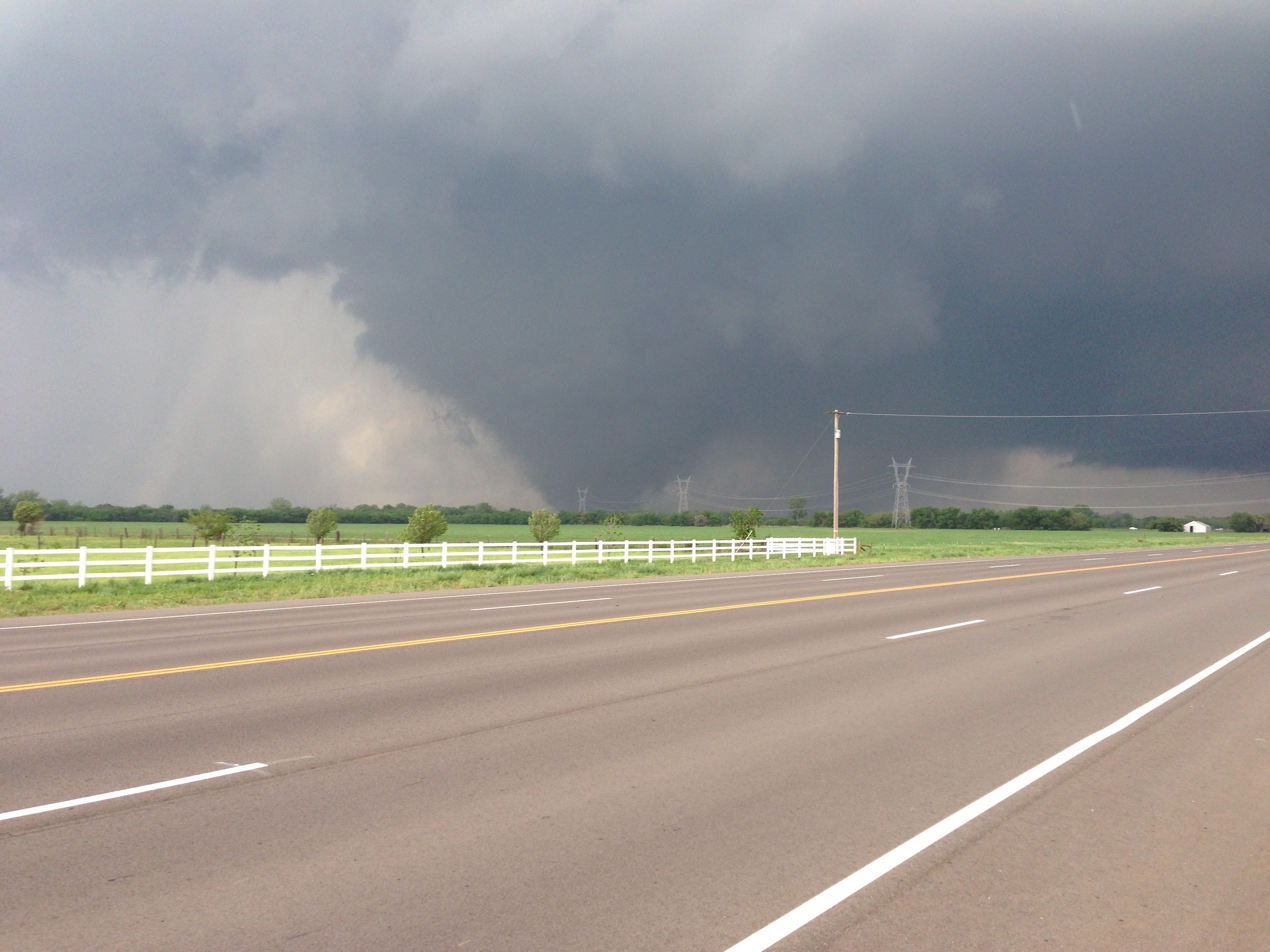
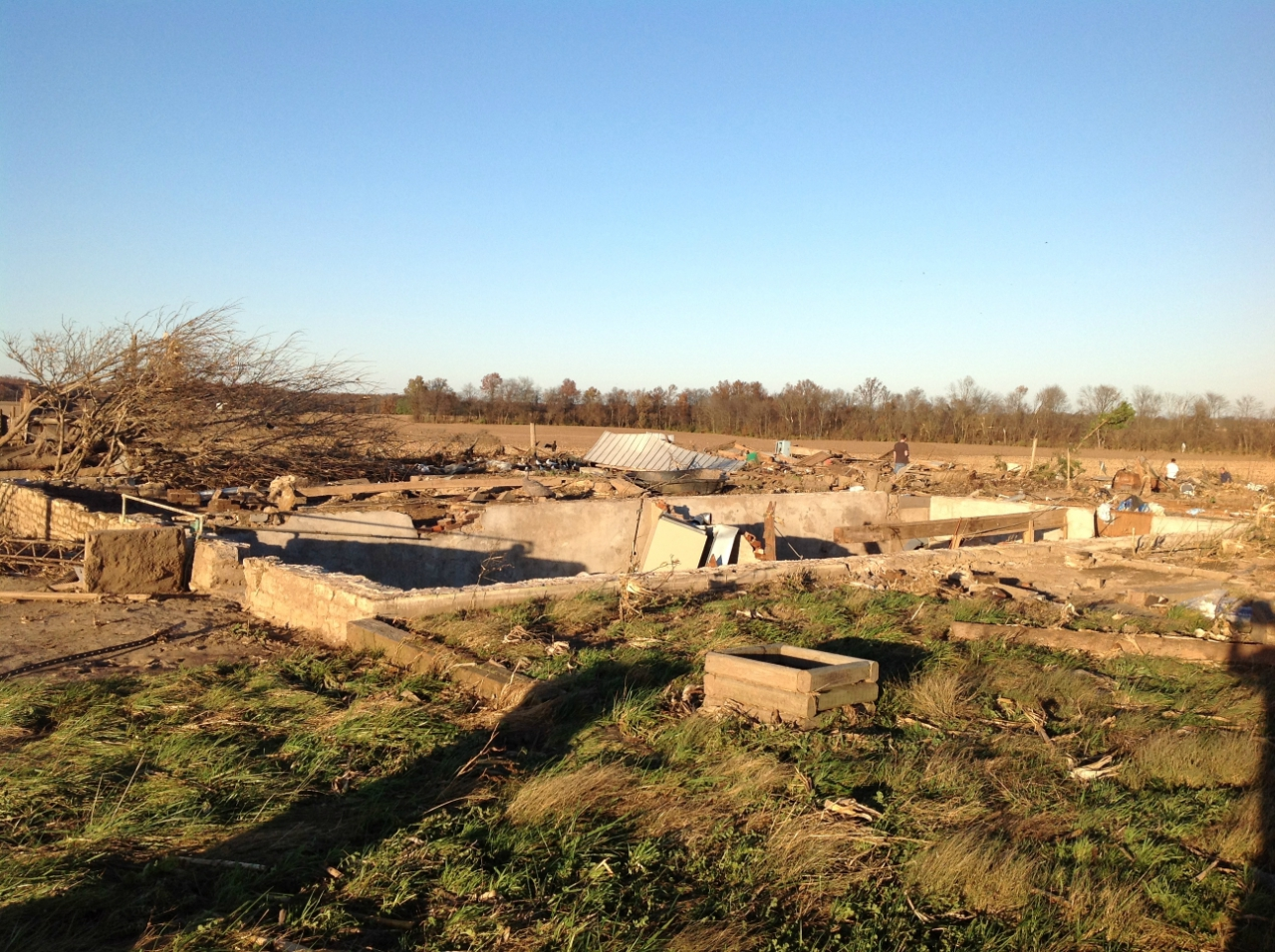
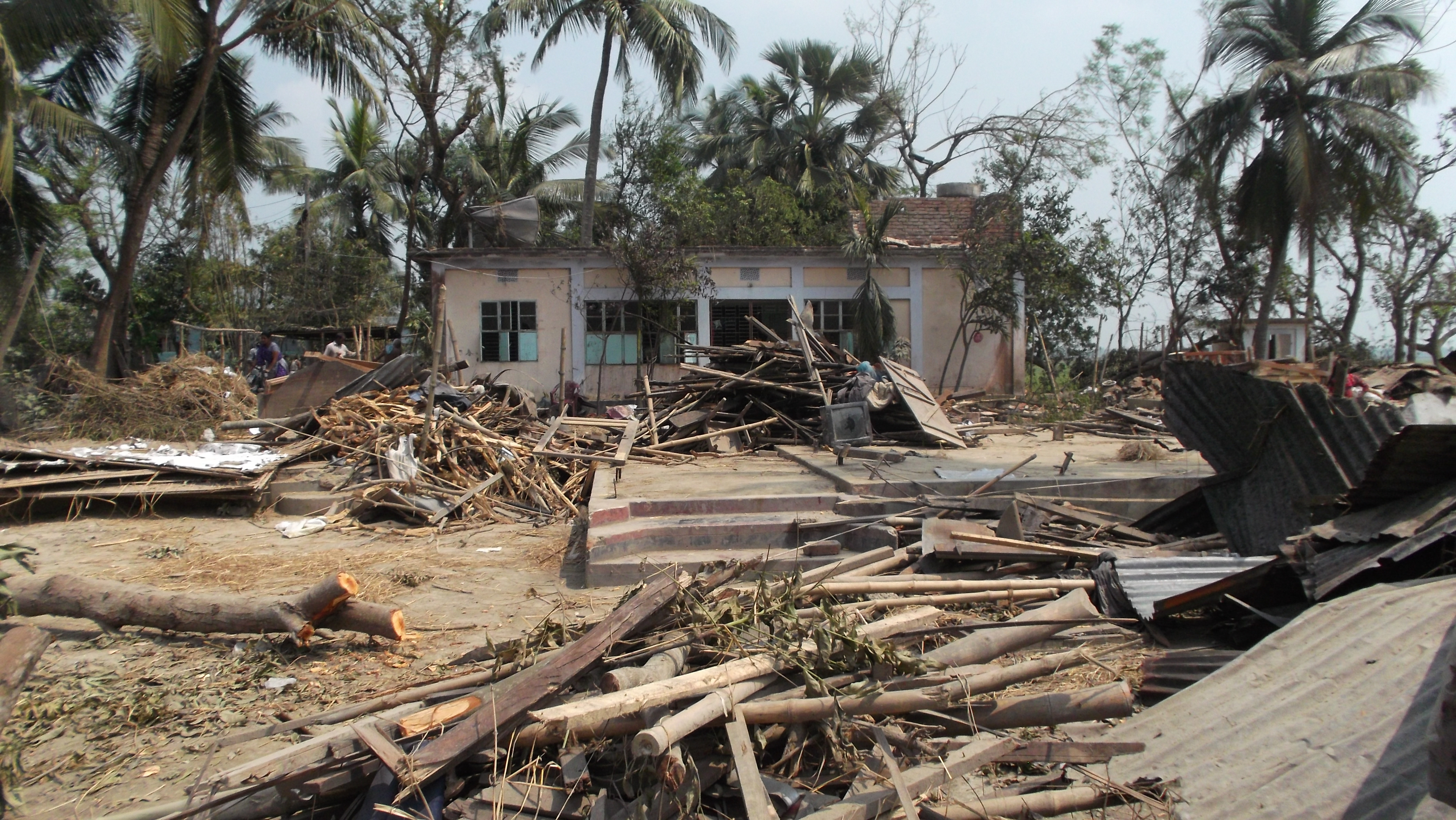
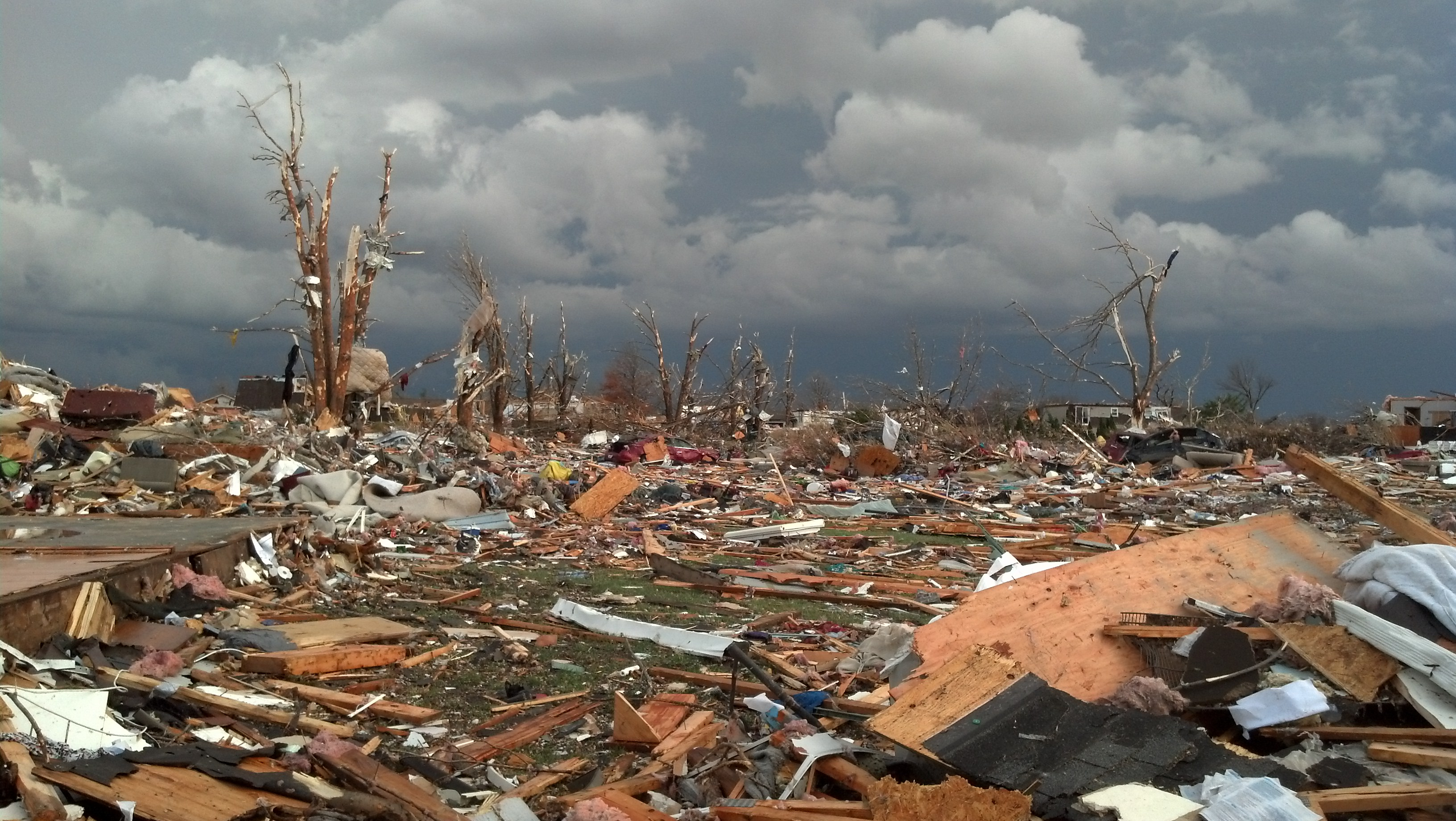
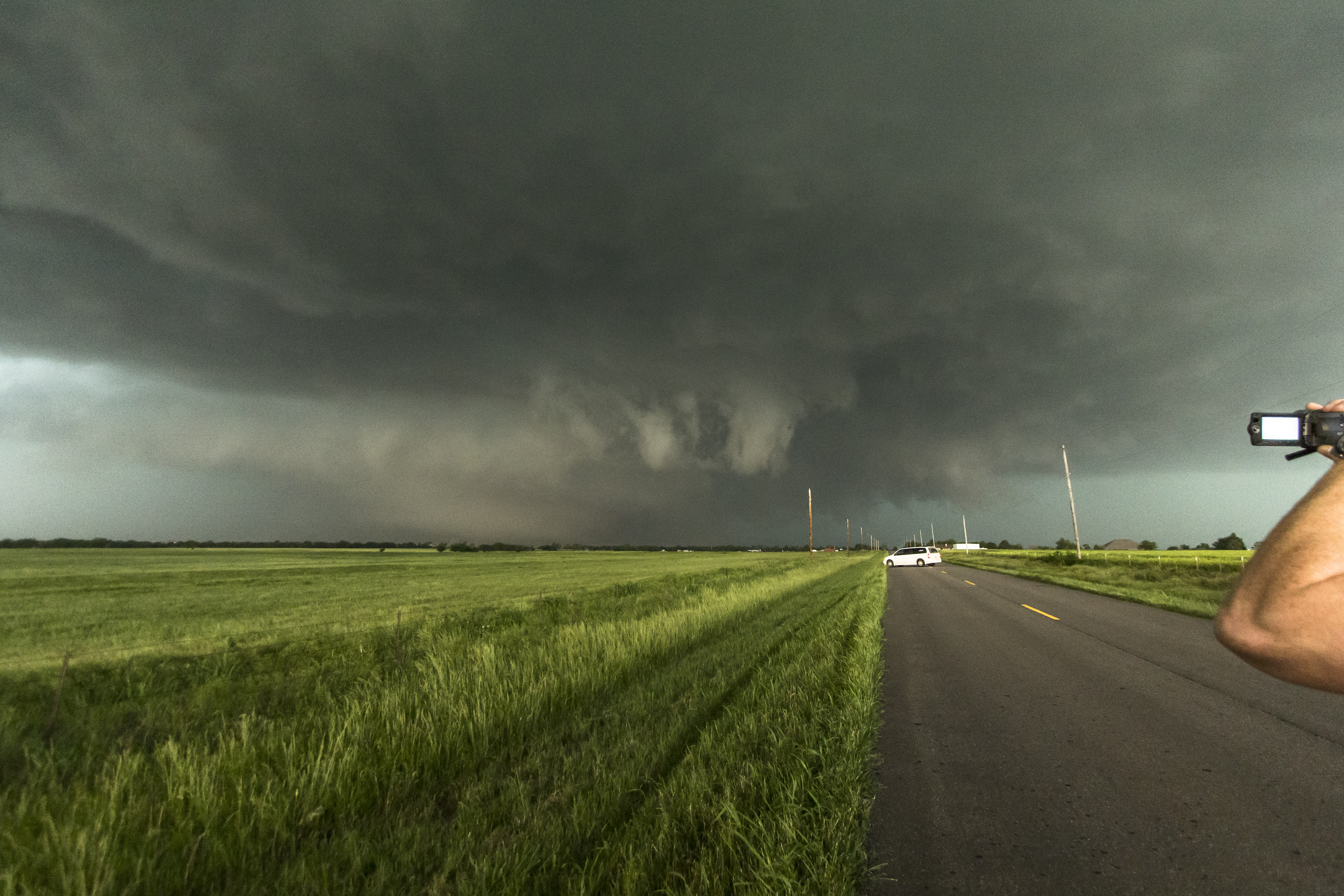
- Clockwise from top: An EF5 tornado approaching the city of Moore, Oklahoma on May 20; Damaged structures in Brahmanbaria District, Bangladesh following an F2 tornado on March 22; Radar imagery of a supercell responsible for spawning a record-breaking EF3 tornado near El Reno, Oklahoma on May 31; A large EF3 tornado south of El Reno, Oklahoma on May 31; A destroyed neighborhood in Washington, Illinois following an EF4 tornado on November 17; EF4 damage to a farmhouse near New Minden, Illinois after a tornado on November 17.
- Timespan: January 6 – December 21, 2013
- Maximum rated tornado: EF5 tornado: Moore, Oklahoma on May 20
- Tornadoes in U.S.: 916
- Damage (U.S.): $3.6 billion
- Fatalities (U.S.): 55
- Fatalities (worldwide): 120

This page documents the tornadoes and tornado outbreaks of 2013. Strong and destructive tornadoes form most frequently in the United States, Bangladesh, Brazil, and Eastern India, but they can occur almost anywhere under the right conditions. Tornadoes also appear regularly in neighboring southern Canada during the Northern Hemisphere's summer season, and somewhat regularly in Europe, Asia, and Australia.

There were 916 tornadoes confirmed in the United States in 2013. One of these tornadoes was the largest ever recorded, which reached a peak width of 2.6 mi (4.2 km) south of El Reno, Oklahoma (which was also impacted by a deadly EF5 tornado two years prior). In total, 120 fatalities were confirmed worldwide in 2013: 55 in the United States, 36 in Bangladesh, 24 in China, three in Turkey, and two in Brazil.

Despite the high death toll along with several large outbreaks, the year was below average in terms of the number of tornadoes that occurred. This was also the most recent year to have an F5/EF5/IF5 tornado until the Enderlin tornado that occurred on June 20, 2025.

On April 1, Canada began utilizing the Enhanced Fujita scale to rate tornadoes with minor modifications to better suit the region's tornadoes.

== Synopsis ==
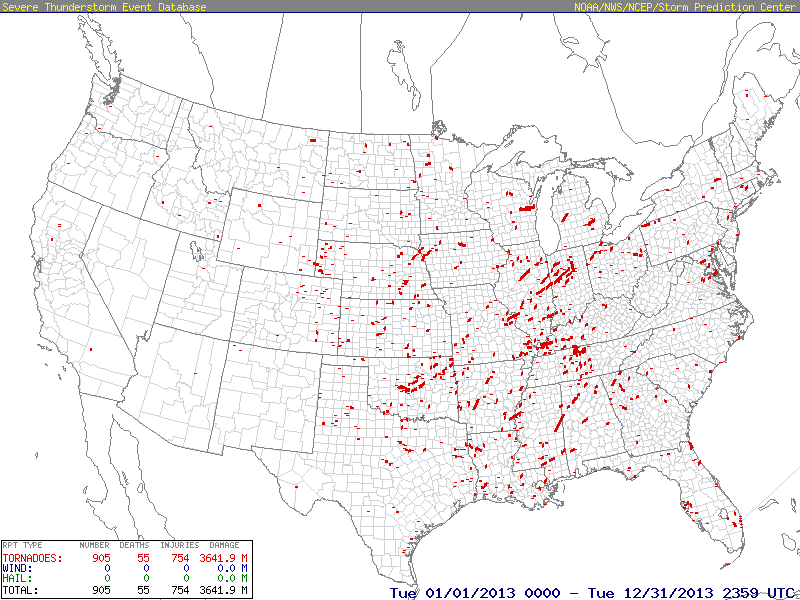
Map of the tracks of all tornadoes in the United States in 2013

Entering 2013, the Oceanic Niño Index (ONI) for the three-month period lasting from November 2012 to January 2013 based on sea surface temperature (SST) anomalies was -0.3, denoting cooler than normal SSTs in areas of the Pacific. Throughout early to mid-January in the United States, there was isolated tornado activity, centered primarily in the South. In late January, an unusually strong upper-level trough combined with atmospheric instability produced a widespread tornado outbreak over the Southern United States. The strongest of these tornadoes was an EF3, the first intense tornado confirmed in the U.S. in 2013. In eastern Australia, the remnants of Tropical Cyclone Oswald produced significant flooding in conjunction with tornadoes in late January. A small outbreak on February 10 spawned an EF4 tornado that affected Hattiesburg, Mississippi.

A period of inactivity followed the early weeks of the year. Both March and April had near-record low activity, which was attributed to cold air persisting over much of the continental U.S., preventing any significant severe weather from occurring (and allowing for late-season winter storms).

However, this pattern changed abruptly in mid-May as a significant outbreak struck towns in north-central Texas, followed closely by a much larger outbreak that affected much of the Midwestern and Southern U.S., especially in Oklahoma. On May 20, an EF5 tornado struck Moore, Oklahoma.

Another powerful outbreak struck the Midwest and Ark-La-Tex area in the final week of May. The outbreak produced the widest tornado in recorded history, just west of Oklahoma City that hit areas just south and southeast of El Reno on May 31, killing storm chaser Tim Samaras and his two partners and a separate storm chaser while also injuring The Weather Channel's Mike Bettes' Tornado Hunt team.

June and July were both below average for tornadoes, with August and September generally near average for tornadoes. Early October featured a very small outbreak of tornadoes over Nebraska and Iowa; however, two of the tornadoes were violent enough to be rated EF4. Another small outbreak with mostly weak tornadoes ended the month, pushing October activity to near average.

After a lull in activity during the first half of November, a large outbreak occurred on November 17, producing 77 tornadoes and killing seven people, leaving November above average for tornadoes. December was below average for tornadoes, with only 18, causing 2013 to end with a record low tornado count with adjustments made for undercounting tornadoes in earlier years.

== Events ==
=== United States ===
Confirmed tornadoes by Enhanced Fujita rating
EFU	EF0	EF1	EF2	EF3	EF4	EF5	Total
0	499	309	80	19	8	1	916

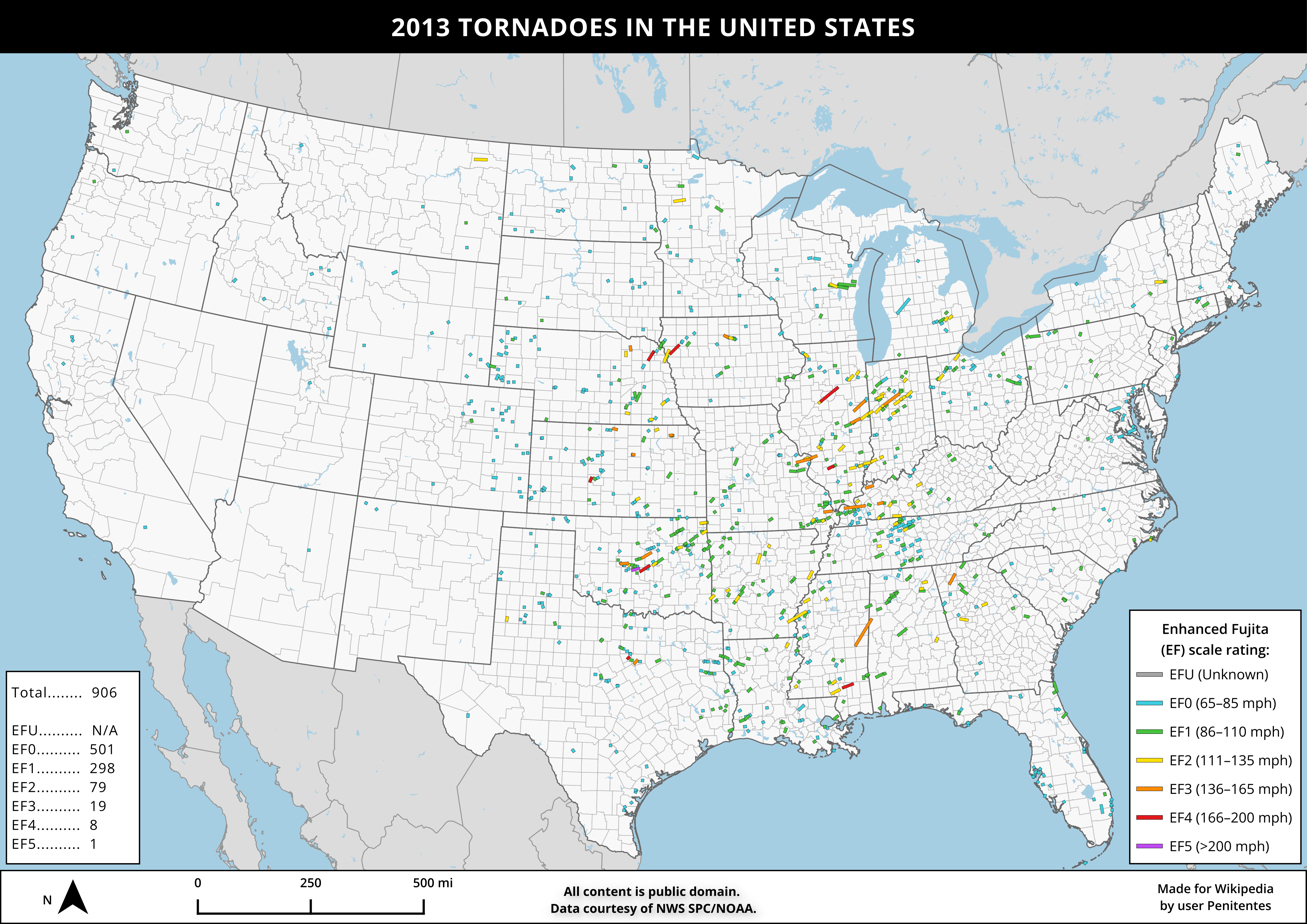
A map of 2013 United States tornado paths from the results of storm surveys.

A chart of the 2013 United States tornado count estimated from the number of preliminary reports

Fatal United States tornadoes in 2013
- Approximate touchdown location of killer tornadoes in 2013 Summary of tornadoes: January 30 – Georgia (1 death); February 21 – Texas (1 death); April 11 – Mississippi (1 death); May 15 – Texas (6 deaths); May 19 – Oklahoma (2 deaths); May 20 – Oklahoma (24 deaths); May 30 – Arkansas (1 death); May 31 – Oklahoma (8 deaths); June 24 – Iowa (1 death); November 17 – Illinois (3 deaths); November 17 – Illinois (2 deaths); November 17 – Kentucky, Illinois (3 deaths); December 21 – Arkansas (1 death); December 21 – Mississippi (1 death); Total fatalities: 55

=== Europe ===
Unlike the United States and Canada, the majority of Europe uses the TORRO scale and the Fujita scale to classify tornadoes. The European Severe Storms Laboratory maintains a database of all severe weather events across the continent. The vast majority of tornadoes go unrated due to a lack of surveys; however, some nations, such as France, provide detailed reports on these events. Of the 57 reported tornadoes during 2013, only 18 have been rated thus far. Totals are derived from this database and considered preliminary.

Confirmed tornadoes by Fujita rating
FU	F0	F1	F2	F3	F4	F5	Total
0	5	8	4	1	0	0	18

== January ==
=== January 15 (Australia) ===
Just before 2 pm AEST two tornadoes tore through the towns of Jundah and Stonehenge in western Queensland, over 1,100 km west of the state capital Brisbane. Damage was significant in both townships, Jundah had significant damage to 80% of buildings and Stonehenge was without power for 52 hours after the tornadoes hit. The impact of the tornado on Jundah caused all communications networks to go down, power was lost, and the single channel radio networks, microwave networks and battery backups went out. The damage to homes alone was estimated to be at least A$1 million, and about A$600,000 worth of damage was done to Barcoo Shire Council properties. The tornadoes were each rated at F1 on the Fujita scale, with winds recorded at 140 km/h (87 mph) near Jundah.

=== January 21 (Australia) ===
A tornado impacted the New South Wales town of Ungarie, located over 500 km west of Sydney the town has a population of approximately 350. The damage was significant enough for Disaster Relief Grants to be made available to those affected by the storm. The cost of the damage to public and private infrastructure in and around Ungarie was estimated to be about A$3 million.

=== January 26–27 (Australia) ===
On the Australia Day weekend, up to nine tornadoes were spawned across the state of Queensland by ex-Tropical Cyclone Oswald. The first tornado struck the coastal town of Bargara, east of the city of Bundaberg, at 1 pm on January 26, injuring 17 people and damaging 150 properties. The second tornado struck the town of Burnett Heads at 3:30 pm, and then a third at Coonarr. Bungadoo, a town 40 kilometres (25 mi) southwest of Bundaberg, was also struck by a tornado after 4 pm, and Burnett Heads was hit again at 6:20 pm Radar imagery showed a possible sixth tornado 30 km west of Maryborough. In a separate incident, a small tornado was spotted over Canberra on January 26. In the early hours of January 27, a tornado struck Burrum Heads 45 kilometres (28 mi) south of Bundaberg, whilst radar imagery showed "possible tornado activity" on Bribie Island. The ninth tornado was reported at Mooloolaba, which swept through a housing estate, uprooting trees and causing minor damage. As a result of the tornadoes, the entirety of Southeast Queensland, including Brisbane, the Sunshine Coast and the Gold Coast, was placed under a tornado watch for January 27.

With five confirmed and another four suspected tornadoes, this was the largest tornado event on record in Australia.

=== January 29–30 (United States) ===
EFU	EF0	EF1	EF2	EF3	EF4	EF5
0	27	28	10	1	0	0

As an intense upper-level trough moved across the interior United States, an extremely warm air mass spread eastward ahead of the storm, resulting in slight atmospheric instability in the Tennessee and Ohio River valleys. The warm air mass was followed by a strong cold front, causing temperatures to fall below freezing. With increased instability in the region, a quasi-linear convective system (QLCS) formed and moved across the area ahead of the cold front, producing numerous tornadoes and wind-related damage. Over a two-day period from January 29 to January 30, 962 tornado, hail, and strong wind reports were received by the Storm Prediction Center (SPC). Of these, 83 were tornado-related reports. The strongest of these tornadoes occurred on January 30 and affected areas of Bartow and Gordon Counties in Georgia. The high-end EF3 killed one person in Adairsville, ending a record 220‑day streak without a tornado-related fatality in the United States, with the last death occurring due to an EF2 tornado associated with Tropical Storm Debby in Florida in June 2012. The 66 confirmed tornadoes was the third most ever recorded to occur in January. The outbreak was the largest January-tornado outbreak in Middle Tennessee, which confirmed 22 tornadoes.

== February ==
=== February 10 (United States) ===
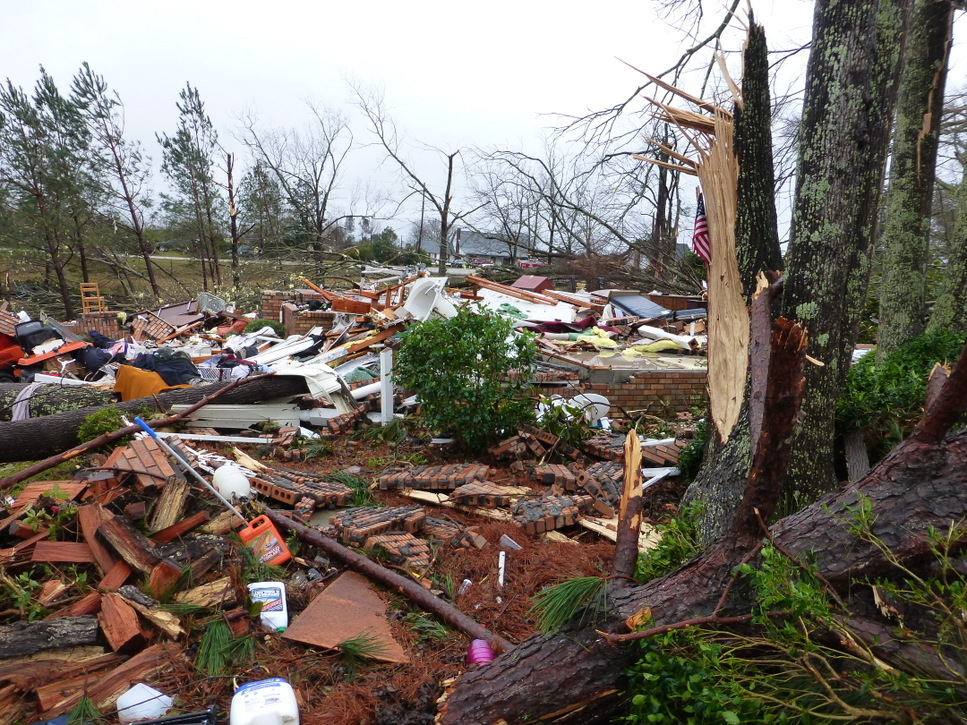
EF4 damage to a house that was completely leveled by the Hattiesburg, Mississippi tornado.

EFU	EF0	EF1	EF2	EF3	EF4	EF5
0	1	5	1	0	1	0

As a large and powerful area of low pressure moved across the northern Plains, powerful severe thunderstorms developed across a trailing cold front. These storms, located across Louisiana and Mississippi primarily, prompted many tornado warnings, with eight tornadoes touching down. One of the supercells produced four tornadoes with the first one being rated EF2. The second tornado was the one that struck Hattiesburg. Shortly after 5:00 pm CST (2300 UTC), the "large and extremely dangerous tornado" was confirmed southwest of Hattiesburg, Mississippi; this wedge tornado, documented by locals and storm chasers, moved through the city after prompting a tornado emergency for the surrounding locations. Severe to locally catastrophic damage was reported in Hattiesburg and the nearby city of Petal, leaving 71 people injured. The tornado was initially rated an EF3, but was later upgraded to an EF4. Mississippi Governor Phil Bryant issued a State of emergency for Forrest, Lamar, Lawrence, and Marion Counties due to the impact of the severe storms and tornadoes in those counties.

=== February 21 (United States) ===
EFU	EF0	EF1	EF2	EF3	EF4	EF5
0	1	4	1	0	0	0

On February 21, a deep upper-level trough moved across the Central Plains, resulting in a small tornado event that produced six tornadoes. An EF1 tornado north of Pineland, Texas, killed a 74-year-old woman when a tree fell on her mobile home.

=== February 24 (Australia) ===
Several tornadoes struck the New South Wales coast during the overnight period of February 23–24. Five tornadoes were investigated by the Australian Bureau of Meteorology on the south coast, initial analysis indicated an EF1 tornado struck Kiama leaving a damage path 4 km long, Jamberoo was hit by an EF0 tornado with a trail of damage 8 km long, and Gerroa to Nowra was struck by an EF2 tornado that left a damage path 16 km long and 200–300 metres wide at its greatest. The tornado that swept through the town of Kiama caused extensive damage to around 75 homes in the area. Further north in Sydney a funnel cloud was reported at Kirribilli just after midnight accompanied by winds to 135 km/h recorded at Sydney Harbour. There was major damage to the roof of the Sydney Flying Squadron, the local Westpac bank, and the surrounding area. Major damage also occurred in Chifley, Malabar and Moore Park where part of the roof of Fox Studios was removed.

== March ==
=== March 18 (United States) ===
EFU	EF0	EF1	EF2	EF3	EF4	EF5
0	4	3	3	0	0	0

A strong upper level system with a moist south to southeast flow produced severe weather, including several tornadoes that injured 13 people altogether, across the Southern United States, especially Tennessee, Alabama, and Georgia. An EF1 tornado near Boaz, Alabama destroyed two mobile homes and overturned another, injuring three people. An EF2 tornado struck Kilpatrick, Alabama causing significant damage to several mobile homes and destroying two others, injuring seven people. Another EF2 caused severe to outbuildings and chicken houses near Rainsville. Near Greenville, South Carolina, an EF2 tornado caused considerable damage to homes and barns. Hail associated with the severe weather event was the mostly costliest hailstorm to impact Jackson, Mississippi as of 2015, while high wind gusts also associated with the severe weather event caused at least 100,000 power outages across Mississippi, Alabama, and Georgia.

=== March 20–21 (China) ===
On March 20, a damaging early-morning tornado moved through Hunan Province, resulting in severe damage in the Yongzhou area. Numerous poorly constructed homes were damaged or destroyed, including a frail two-story housing structure that collapsed. Scaffolding was destroyed, and a metal truss transmission tower was blown over. Power poles were snapped, and trees were downed as well. Three people were killed by the tornado, and 53 others were injured. Severe weather continued on March 21, as powerful storms with large hail and another tornado hit parts Guangdong Province, with the most severe damage occurring in the Dongguan area. Factories sustained major damage, vehicles were overturned, and multiple homes were destroyed along the path, most of which were poorly constructed. 24 people were killed by the Dongguan tornado, with 11 of them on a ferry that capsized. 148 others were injured.

=== March 21 (Australia) ===
EFU	EF0	EF1	EF2	EF3	EF4	EF5
0	3	2	0	1	1	0

During the afternoon an evening of March 21, severe supercell thunderstorms spawned a small but damaging outbreak of seven tornadoes in northeastern Victoria, a couple of which were strong to violent. The day started with was a brief EF0 tornado that touched down near Kerang, causing minimal damage. Two separate tornadoes also occurred near Mansfield, with one rated EF0 and the other rated EF1. Later that day, a powerful EF3 tornado caused significant damage to trees and several farms near the rural community of Tamleugh North. A few homes were damaged, one of which sustained major structural damage. Large gum trees were uprooted by the tornado, and metal fence posts anchored in concrete were ripped out of the ground.

After the Tamleugh North tornado lifted, what would become the most intense and long-tracked tornado of the outbreak touched down in the town of Koonoomoo, tearing roofs off of homes and businesses, and snapping or denuding numerous trees. Continuing along an east-southeasterly path, the large stovepipe tornado intensified as it passed near Cobram, where trees were denuded and partially debarked, and vehicles and pieces of farm machinery were thrown and mangled. The tornado reached EF4 intensity as it passed near Mulwala. The tornado displayed a multiple-vortex structure in this area and numerous large trees sustained severe debarking, while a small hut was swept clean from its foundation, and some ground scouring was observed. The Denison County Caravan Park sustained major damage along this segment of the path, with numerous caravans being damaged, thrown, or destroyed. Past the caravan park, the tornado continued toward Bundalong and weakened slightly, though remained strong as a well-built brick home sustained total roof and exterior wall loss. Maintaining its strength, the tornado then impacted the Bundalong area and significantly damaged multiple homes, some of which also sustained roof and exterior wall loss. Additional trees and some reinforced concrete poles were snapped by the tornado before it dissipated outside of Bundalong. Eighty people were injured by the EF4 tornado, with two men airlifted to Melbourne in critical condition. Later that evening, an EF0 tornado caused minor damage near Benalla. The final tornado of the day was an EF1 that struck the downtown area of Rutherglen, where windows were broken, awnings were ripped off, and one business sustained total collapse of a masonry exterior wall. Despite the damage and injuries, no fatalities occurred as a result of the outbreak. The Mulwala EF4 was the first violent tornado documented in Australia since the Bucca tornado of 1992.

=== March 22 (Bangladesh) ===
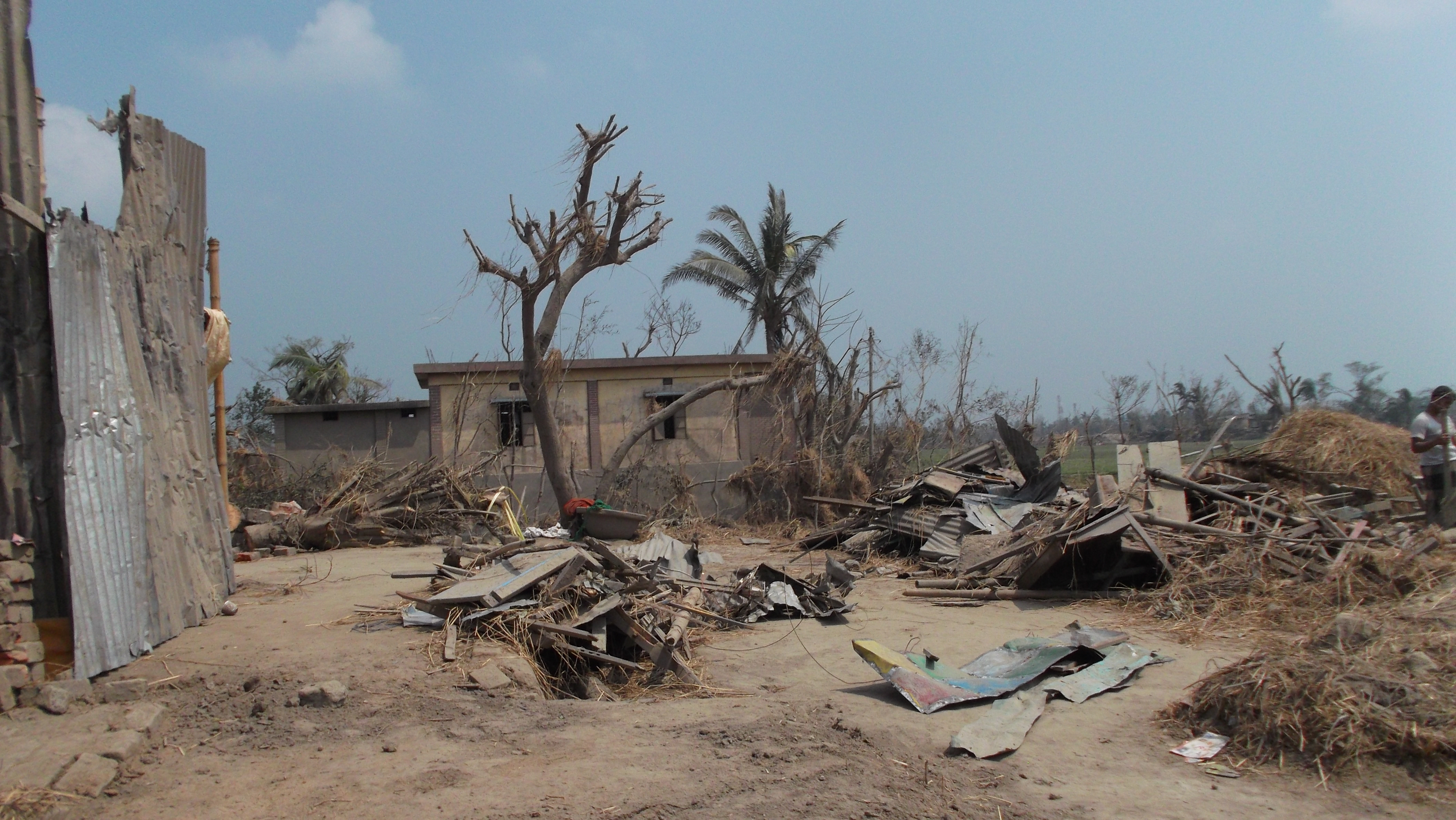
Severe tree and structural damage from an F2 tornado in the Brahmanbaria District of Bangladesh.

On March 22, a narrow but intense and deadly F2 tornado took place in the Brahmanbaria District of Bangladesh, resulting in severe damage and numerous fatalities. The tornado struck multiple villages along a 8 kilometres (5.0 mi) path, traveling at a speed of 70 kilometres per hour (43 mph), killing 36 people and injuring approximately 461. Numerous homes, most of which were small and of frail construction, were completely destroyed. Multiple well-built structures sustained major damage as well, and part of a local jail house was collapsed, resulting in the death of one guard. The worst damage occurred in the Bijoynagar, Akhaura, Brahmanbaria Sadar, and Upazila areas of the district. Thousands of trees and utility poles were snapped or toppled, and some trees were denuded, debarked, and stripped of foliage. Debris from the tornado disrupted both train tracks and roads, which interrupted rescue operations. Farm fields were also scoured by the tornado, and many crops, mostly consisting of rice, were ruined. Thousands of people were left homeless after the disaster. Both Prime minister Sheikh Hasina and opposition leader Khaleda Zia visited the impacted areas to meet the affected people and distribute relief.

=== March 27 (Philippines) ===
A tornado moved across marshland on the island of Mindanao in the southern Philippines on March 27. It passed near an overloaded boat triggering a panic that caused the boat to capsize, killing 12. The boat had a capacity of 10 but was carrying 18.

== April ==
=== April 7–13 (United States) ===
EFU	EF0	EF1	EF2	EF3	EF4	EF5
0	9	14	4	1	0	0

As a powerful trough moved into the Rocky Mountains, return flow from the Gulf of Mexico provided ample moisture for the development of severe thunderstorms. This resulted in a moderate multi-day tornado outbreak that produced 28 tornadoes. A brief rope tornado was reported on April 7, near Paradise, Kansas, but no damage was reported. The following day, several tornadoes were reported in Colorado, Kansas, and Nebraska. The first tornado (rated EF0) touched down in Kit Carson County, Colorado, causing no damage. The second tornado (rated EF1) touched down shortly before 0300 UTC in Nebraska, causing substantial damage to a farm and feed yard. Cars and trucks were flipped off of highways, power poles and trees were snapped, and many buildings were damaged. No tornadoes were observed the following day, April 9, due to an inversion aloft, but many reports of large hail were received from Iowa to Texas.

As the system pushed eastward across Missouri and Arkansas, and as a warm front drifted northward, severe thunderstorms broke out along both boundaries. Several storms in association with a squall line caused damaging winds. That evening, a damaging EF2 tornado touched down in the St. Louis suburb of Hazelwood, Missouri, tearing the roofs off of several homes and apartment buildings, downing numerous trees and power lines, and flipping many cars. Another EF2 tornado touched down in Van Buren County, Arkansas, prompting a tornado emergency. Significant damage was reported near Scotland, including many vehicles thrown off the road and many homes and other buildings being destroyed. The supercell that spawned the Scotland area tornado also produced a damaging EF2 near Mt. Olive as well.

On April 11, a supercell ahead of the squall line developed in eastern Mississippi. A large wedge tornado touched down in Kemper County and moved into Noxubee County and Pickens County, Alabama. The tornado was rated EF3 and was on the ground for 68.4 miles (110.1 km). Several homes, a metal tower structure, and a steel-frame building were destroyed by the tornado. One person was killed and five were injured in Kemper County and another four people were injured in Noxubee County. A total of seven counties in Mississippi reported damage. Mississippi Governor Phil Bryant declared a state of emergency for Kemper and Noxubee counties due to the impacts of the tornado. Later that evening, an EF2 tornado passed west of Notasulga, Alabama and heavily damaged several homes and mobile homes. One mobile home was completely destroyed, and a well-built house received major damage to an outer wall and lost its entire roof. Trees and headstones were knocked over, and one person was injured by flying glass. Other weaker tornadoes were confirmed across parts of Louisiana, Alabama, and Georgia before the outbreak came to an end.

On April 13, a intense tornado striuke portions of Kemper County, Noxubee County, and Pickens County, Alabama. It wason the ground for 68.4 miles (110.1 km), killing one person and injuring nine. The tornado crossed 68.4 miles in 1 hour and 15 minutes and touched down about 3.4 miles (5.5 km) northeast of Herbert Springs. It killed one and injure 9 others.

=== April 17–19 (United States) ===
EFU	EF0	EF1	EF2	EF3	EF4	EF5
0	10	12	2	0	0	0

On April 17, a powerful upper-level low pressure system and associated warm front developed across the central United States. The Storm Prediction Center issued a moderate risk of severe weather for much of central Oklahoma, including a 15% hatched risk of tornadoes, some of which were predicted to be strong. Several supercell thunderstorms developed that evening and rapidly became severe. Multiple tornadoes touched down across the risk area that evening and overnight, though all were weak and relatively brief. A few weak tornadoes also touched down in Texas and Missouri.

Tornadoes continued touching down early into the morning of the 18th, including an EF2 that caused considerable damage near Zena, Oklahoma. Other weak tornadoes occurred later that afternoon in Arkansas, Mississippi, and Louisiana. The system also caused one tornado to touch down near Shelburne, Ontario (rated by Environment Canada to be an EF1, Canada's first tornado to be rated as such as the ratings are transitioned to the Enhanced Fujita Scale).

Isolated tornado activity continued on the 19th, with several touchdowns occurring mostly across the eastern United States. Five tornadoes were confirmed, including an EF2 that caused severe damage in the town of Mansfield, Georgia.

== May ==
=== May 3 (Italy) ===
FU	F0	F1	F2	F3	F4	F5
0	0	0	2	1	0	0

On May 3, severe supercell thunderstorms in northern Italy produced a localized outbreak of strong tornadoes. The first tornado was a high-end F2 that impacted the Castelfranco Emilia area, causing severe damage along a 18 km path. The tornado severely damaged multiple farm homes, some of which sustained roof loss and some collapse of exterior walls. Vehicles were flipped, light poles were toppled, and large trees were snapped or uprooted as well. Warehouses also sustained major damage along the path. After the initial tornado dissipated, the same supercell then produced a large, high-end F3 tornado that struck near Argelato, causing major damage along a 20 km path and injuring 12 people. Well-built brick farm homes were heavily damaged, and a few were largely destroyed. Trees were snapped and denuded by the tornado, and vehicles were thrown and destroyed. Near Mirandola, a strong F2 tornado damaged some buildings and injured one person. A total of three tornadoes were recorded, 13 people were injured, 119 people were made homeless, and large hail (up to 8 cm) caused severe damage to buildings and agriculture.

=== May 11 (Turkey) ===
On May 11, a tornado struck Kiziltepe, Turkey, tossing debris, causing minor damage, and killing one person.

=== May 14 (Turkey) ===
For the second time in a month, a deadly tornado touched down in Turkey. Two people were killed when the tornado struck a construction site at the Çukurova Regional Airport in Mersin Province. Greenhouses, power lines, and metal buildings were ripped apart by the tornado. 19 other people were injured.

=== May 15–17 (United States) ===
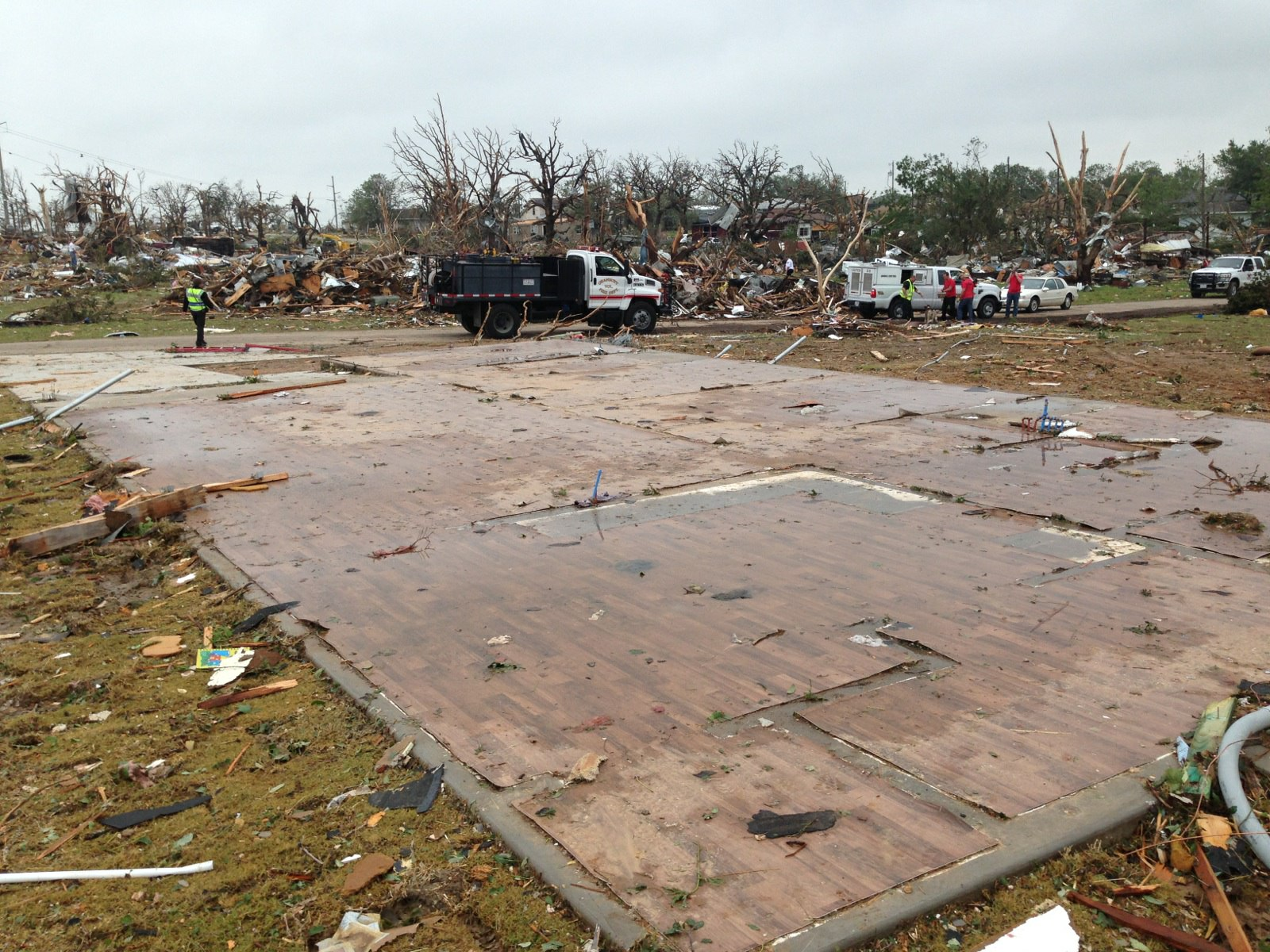
Remains of a home that was reduced to a bare slab by an EF4 tornado near Granbury, Texas.

EFU	EF0	EF1	EF2	EF3	EF4	EF5
0	19	10	0	1	1	0

During the evening of May 15, 18 tornadoes touched down over Texas and Oklahoma, including one tornado in Granbury that was rated EF4. Severe damage took place in Granbury, where multiple homes were leveled or swept away. Six people were killed in the town while eight others were injured. All the deaths took place in the small sub-division of Rancho Brazos on the outskirts of Granbury. Surveys also revealed EF3 damage in Cleburne, caused by a large wedge tornado that touched down in the area. A weaker tornado struck the town of Millsap, destroying a barn and damaging several homes.

Over the next two days, the system weakened but continued to produce a few tornadoes across the South. On May 16, four EF1 tornadoes touched down near the Texas/Louisiana state line (with two tornadoes in TX; two in LA). Several buildings and a few houses were damaged and one person was injured. On May 17, the system pushed eastward and two brief EF0 tornadoes touched down in Limestone County, Alabama, with several houses being damaged.

=== May 18–21 (United States and Canada) ===
EFU	EF0	EF1	EF2	EF3	EF4	EF5
0	37	32	5	1	2	1

During the evening of May 18, tornadoes touched down in parts of Kansas and Nebraska. However, most remained in open country with little damage. A large EF4 tornado near Rozel, Kansas damaged five farms and largely destroyed one home.

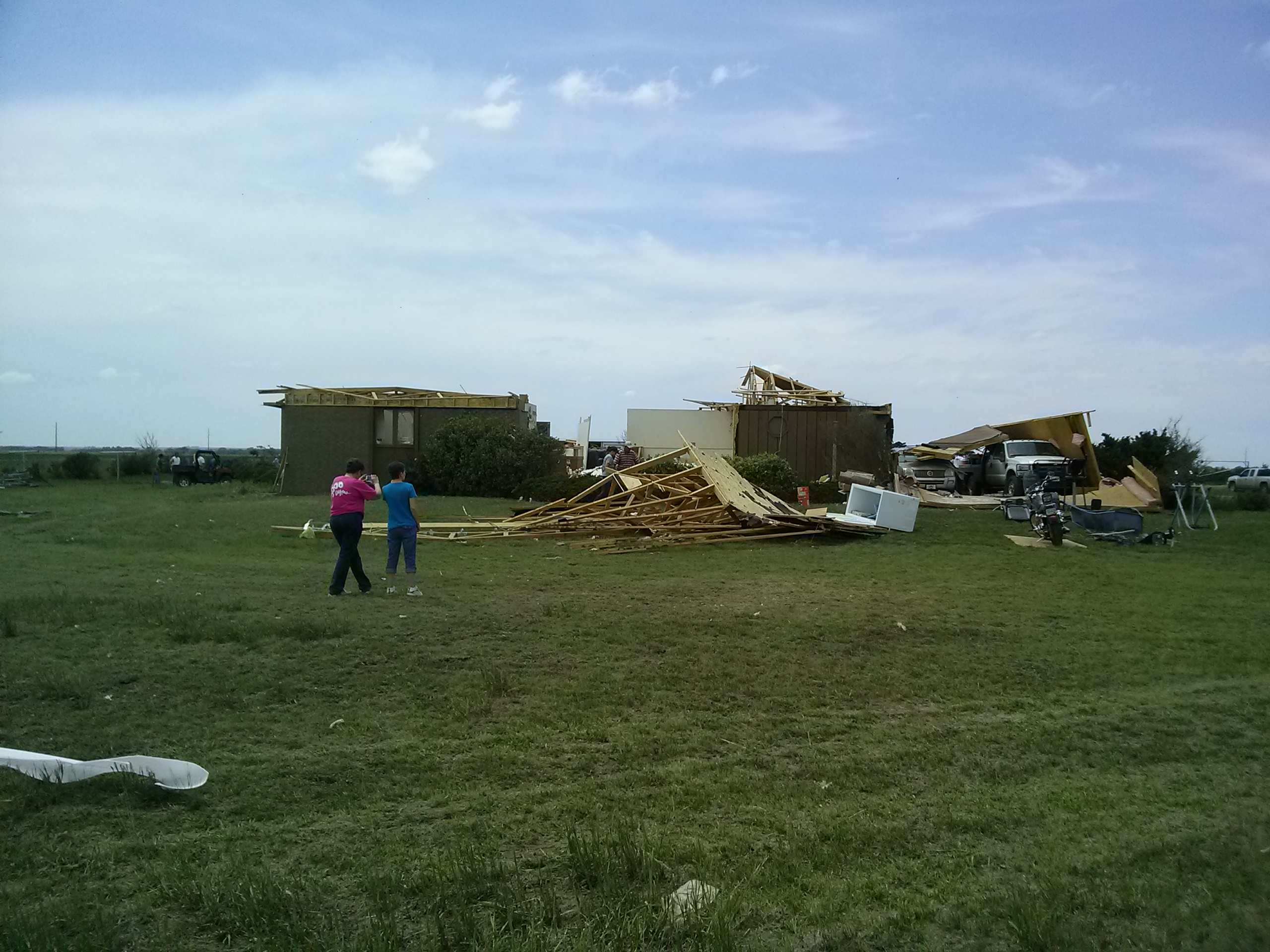
A home largely destroyed by an EF4 tornado that touched down near Rozel, Kansas on May 18.

On May 19, the slow-moving system produced another severe weather event just east of the previous day. Multiple tornadoes, mostly brief, were reported in Kansas once again. An EF2 tornado touched down near southwest Wichita, damaging several homes and many trees. Further south, two long-tracked wedge tornadoes moved in two corridors from Luther to Tryon and from Norman to McLoud in Oklahoma. Damage in both swaths was severe to extreme, with many houses destroyed. The second of these intense tornadoes, an EF4, struck a mobile home park near Shawnee in Pottawatomie County, damaging or destroying 30–35 homes. Two people were killed and six others were injured there. Storm spotters reported scoured earth along the tornado's track in this area. Throughout the state, 20 people were treated for injuries, while many others likely sustained minor injuries.

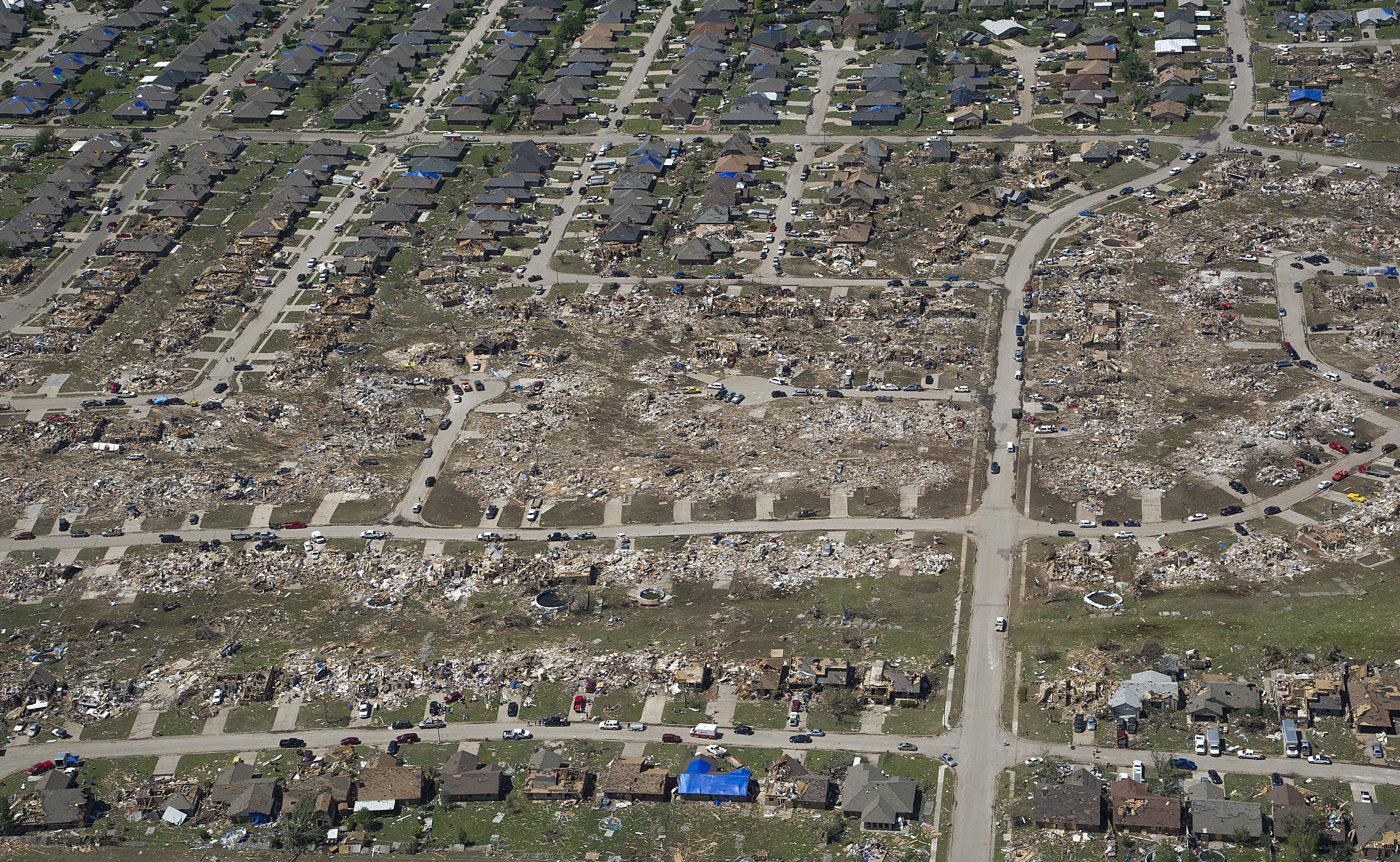
Aerial view of destroyed houses in Moore, Oklahoma following an EF5 tornado on May 20

During the evening and overnight hours of May 19, tornadic activity became more sparse, with a few tornadoes reported in Iowa, Illinois, and Missouri. At least two tornadoes were confirmed in Iowa, one near Huxley and another near Earlham. The touchdowns in Iowa marked the end of a 358‑day span with no tornadoes in the state.

On the afternoon of May 20, a large, violent tornado touched down west of Newcastle, Oklahoma and impacted the town of Moore, causing severe damage to residential areas as well as Plaza Towers and Briarwood Elementary schools. The Oklahoma Office of the Chief Medical Examiner confirmed 24 fatalities, 7 of which were schoolchildren at Plaza Towers Elementary. After being preliminarily rated a high-end EF4, it was increased, and the tornado was given a final rating of EF5. The tornado followed a path similar to that of the F5 tornado that hit the area on May 3, 1999. The tornado became the first EF5 tornado in nearly two years. Following this event was the start of the longest EF5 drought lasting until June 20, 2025, with the Enderlin tornado.

On May 21, an EF2 tornado touched down near the small community of Glenarm, Ontario about 12 kilometres (7.5 mi) west of Fenelon Falls, and Environment Canada confirmed that the roof of a home was torn off by the tornado and a barn was destroyed. No injuries were reported in this storm. This was Ontario's second tornado of the 2013 season.

=== May 22 (Russia) ===
On May 22, an F2 tornado struck the town of Yefremov, Russia, damaging 200 homes and leaving 100 million rubles (US$31.9 million) in losses.

=== May 26–31 (United States) ===
EFU	EF0	EF1	EF2	EF3	EF4	EF5
0	72	44	12	6	0	0

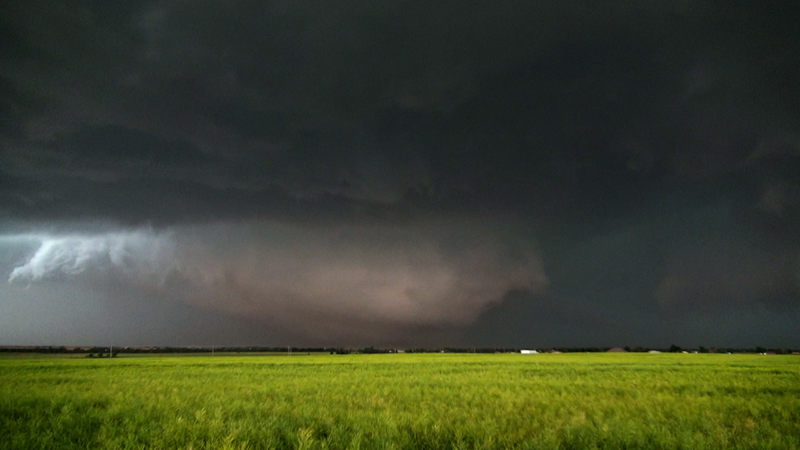
The historical 2.6 mi (4.2 km) wide EF3 tornado outside of El Reno, Oklahoma, on May 31.

A large, slow moving system produced 134 tornadoes across the Great Plains in the last week of May. Many tornadoes, some strong to violent, touched down across Kansas and Nebraska from the 27th through the 29th, with weaker tornadoes recorded in other states. One of the most notable tornadoes of the outbreak was a 2.6 miles (4.2 km) wide wedge tornado that struck near El Reno, Oklahoma on the evening of May 31. It was the widest tornado ever recorded. The tornado was initially rated an EF5, with estimated winds being measured at >295 miles per hour (475 km/h) by a mobile Doppler radar; however, the worst damage was rated EF3, thus on August 30, 2013, the tornado's rating was downgraded to EF3. Eight deaths were attributed to this tornado including four storm chasers; TWISTEX project leader Tim Samaras, his son Paul, fellow chaser Carl Young, and amateur storm chaser Richard Charles Henderson. That same evening, a large EF3 tornado moved through several St. Louis suburbs, resulting in major damage and two injuries. In total, the outbreak resulted in 134 tornadoes.

=== May 28 (Philippines) ===
An EFU tornado struc multiple towns in the province of Iloilo at around 11:30 PhST. In Estancia, 48 boats were destroyed which amounted to 3.5 Million and 10 people were injured. In Carles, 6 boats were also destroyed. In Barotac Nuevo, one hosue were destroyed and two others were damaged. In Jaro a total of 6 houses were destroyed and 30 others were damaged.

=== May 29 (Philippines) ===
An EF1 tornado struck San Pablo, Zamboanga del Sur at around 5:30 PhST where it destroyed at least 9 houses and damaged 12 others which affected 28 families. Meanwhile an Anticyclonic, Multi-vortex EF1 Wedge tornado struck Davao City where it damaged 20 Houses and Uprooted trees near the University of the Philippines Mindanao.

== June ==
=== June 9–10 (United States) ===
EFU	EF0	EF1	EF2	EF3	EF4	EF5
0	8	3	1	0	0	0

As a strong system moved through the United States, numerous tornadoes were reported. On June 9, an EF0 tornado struck the Ulysses, Kentucky area, causing minor damage. Two brief tornadoes touched down in Franklin County, Tennessee as well. An EF2 just north of Adairville, Kentucky on June 10 caused extensive damage along its 14 miles (23 km) track. Four tornadoes caused mostly minor damage in Maryland on June 10, as well as a few others causing damage in Virginia, North Carolina, South Carolina, and Delaware.

=== June 12 (Australia) ===
A rare winter storm system moved through eastern Australia on June 12, with a supercell storm spawning a tornado north of Warwick in southern Queensland. Several rural homes and farms were severely damaged, with one house completely destroyed. However, there was only one injury reported. The storm was also accompanied by heavy rain and large hail. A second tornado was reported near Barraba in New South Wales, however it has not been confirmed.

=== June 12–13 (United States) ===
EFU	EF0	EF1	EF2	EF3	EF4	EF5
0	15	10	2	1	0	0

An unseasonably strong low pressure system resulted in a severe weather outbreak across the Midwest on June 12. For the first time since April 14, 2012, a high risk of severe weather was issued for parts of the Midwest for June 12, with widespread damaging winds being the main threat. Tornadoes were a major threat as well, and several touched downed across Iowa, Illinois, and Ohio. At least 28 tornadoes were confirmed with the system as it pushed eastward, with tornadoes touching down in Maryland, Virginia, Tennessee, North Carolina, and Georgia on June 13. One tornado in Iowa was rated EF3, destroying two homes and a restaurant. An EF2 in Carroll County, Illinois pushed a home off of its foundation, damaged several outbuildings, and injured one person.

=== June 18 (Philippines) ===
A EF2 tornado struck Minglanilla and Talisay in the province of Cebu that originated as a Waterspout. around 14:00 PhST, the tornado struck Minglanilla where it damage more than 55 houses, an animal feeds factory, and lamp posts which amounted up ₱1 Million. It reached estimated winds speed of 200 Km/h (124 Mph). Three people were injured and brought to a nearby hospitals. it then reach Talisay at around 15:45 PhST where it damaged at least 7 houses and a School. A day later, Minglanilla was declared under the state of calamity after the tornado affected 177 People

=== June 19 (Europe) ===
FU	F0	F1	F2	F3	F4	F5
0	0	0	2	1	0	0

On June 19, a very unstable air mass developed over northeastern France. With CAPE levels of 5,000 J/kg, helicity of 239 m^{2}/s^{2}, and dew points as high as 23 °C (73 °F), numerous severe thunderstorms developed across the region. One of these storms produced a destructive F3 tornado near the town of Châtillon-sur-Seine, France, in the department of Côte-d'Or. In addition to the tornado, the parent supercell thunderstorm produced extensive straight-line wind damage from multiple microbursts, which occurred in the rough terrain surrounding Châtillon-sur-Seine. The tornadic supercell that produced this tornado formed around 4:45 pm local time. A high-precipitation type supercell, the storm quickly developed a significant downdraft. The tornado was estimated to have touched down around 5:40 pm along the north side of the rear-flank downdraft. Moving along an intermittent path to the northeast and later east-northeast, the tornado fluctuated between F1 and F2 intensity. As the storm moved over Étrochey, the tornado reached F3 strength and destroyed a stone barn, debarked and defoliated trees, broke concrete electrical poles, and tossed a heavy gate several hundred meters. Other structures in the area sustained major roof damage, and tiles from the roofs of damaged buildings were found up to 500 m (550 yd) away embedded in the ground. As it moved into Montliot-et-Courcelles, a home was largely destroyed, with debris strewn over several hundred meters, and other nearby homes were damaged as well. Overall, the tornado moved along a discontinuous path 14 km (8.7 mi) long and reached a maximum width of 250 m (270 yd). A total of 20 homes were severely damaged or destroyed while 190 more sustained varying degrees of damage. One person sustained minor injuries in relation to the tornado. This was the strongest tornado in France since the deadly 2008 F4 Hautmont tornado. In Germany, an F2 tornado struck Reddingen, causing damage to structures and snapping numerous large trees. A strong F2 tornado that ripped roofs off of homes and downed many trees and power lines was also confirmed in Kuralovo, Russia.

== July ==
=== July 29–30 (Europe) ===
FU	F0	F1	F2	F3	F4	F5
3	1	1	1	0	0	0

A small outbreak of mostly weak tornadoes affected Europe in late July 2013, with the most severe impacts occurring in Italy on July 29. The first tornado of the event began as a waterspout before coming ashore in Sanremo, sweeping away gazebos, downing many trees, and scattering beach furniture in all directions. Two injuries had occurred, including a woman who was injured when her sliding glass door shattered. Some vehicles were damaged by flying debris as well. An F1 tornado also struck Settimo Milanese, where buildings had roofing peeled off, homes were damaged, and some trees were downed. Another brief tornado was also observed over an open field near Veniano, causing no damage. Later that day, the most significant tornado of the outbreak touched down to the northeast of Milan, striking Grezzago and Trezzo sull'Adda, and producing major damage in an industrial area. Several large warehouses and industrial buildings were significantly damaged, and large trees were downed by this strong F2 tornado. Multiple cars and semi-trucks were flipped, tossed, and severely damaged, and large amounts of debris was scattered throughout the area. Metal light poles and sign posts were bent to the ground, and several homes also sustained damage. Twelve people were injured. An F0 tornado was also confirmed in Russia, near Lyambir. On May 30, a final brief and weak tornado occurred in Denmark near Marslet, causing no known damage. A total of six tornadoes were confirmed.

== August ==
=== August 2 (Australia) ===
A brief but strong tornado spawned by a strong winter frontal system badly damaged several buildings in the town of Kingston SE, South Australia. Several roofs were torn off homes in residential areas, and the whole town was left without electricity due to power line damage, however there were no major injuries reported.

=== August 19 (Europe) ===
FU	F0	F1	F2	F3	F4	F5
1	1	1	1	0	0	0

A short-lived F2 tornado moved through a camping site, throwing caravans and destroying tents near Pommertsweiler, Baden-Württemberg, Germany. At least 27 people had to be hospitalized, most of them children. An F1 tornado also touched down near Mishkova, Russia, snapping numerous trees in a remote forested area. A weak F0 tornado occurred near Vladivostok, Russia as well. A weak tornado of unknown intensity was also confirmed near Midwolda, Netherlands, causing no known damage. A total of four tornadoes were confirmed.

== September ==
=== September 2–4 (Japan) ===
Due to atmospheric instability associated with Severe Tropical Storm Toraji as it made landfall in Japan in early September, a number of F0 and F1 tornadoes occurred. Although there were no fatalities, 60 people were injured and over 1,500 houses were damaged.

=== September 15–16 (Japan) ===
FU	F0	F1	F2	F3	F4	F5
0	3	7	0	0	0	0

During mid-September, as Typhoon Man-yi approached and made landfall in Japan, at least ten F0 and F1 tornadoes were reported to have occurred in the Island nation. Over 900 homes were damaged and 10 people were injured.

=== September 22 (Brazil) ===
The city of Taquarituba, in the state of São Paulo, was partially destroyed by a powerful tornado which damaged approximately 200 houses. 2 people died and 64 were injured. Following the storm, after about half of the city lost electricity and telephone service, the city's mayor declared a state of emergency.

== October ==
=== October 3–7 (United States) ===
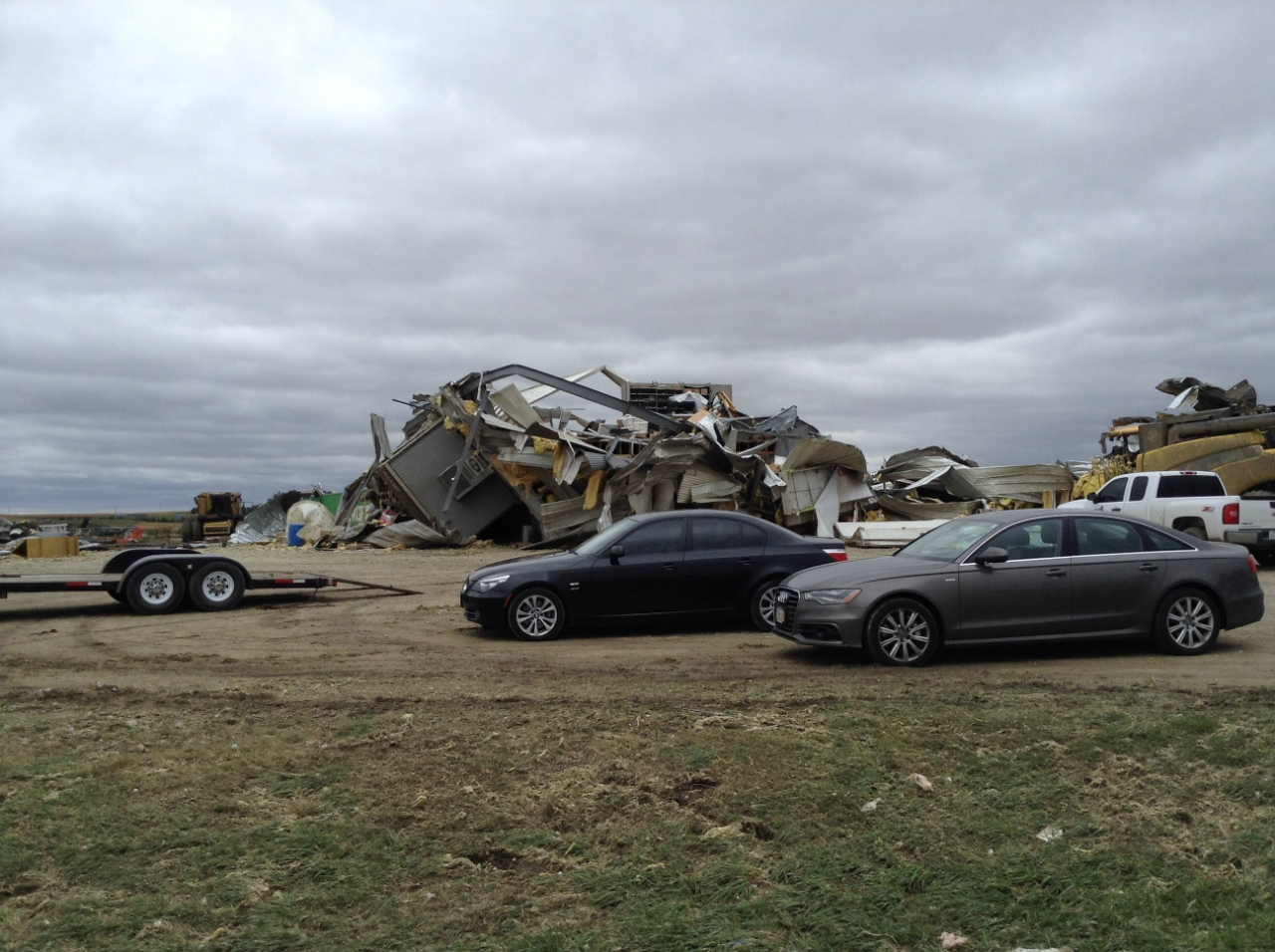
EF4 damage to a factory in Wayne, Nebraska from a tornado on October 4.

EFU	EF0	EF1	EF2	EF3	EF4	EF5
0	10	6	3	1	2	0

A low pressure system produced several tornadoes across northeastern Nebraska, western Iowa, and extreme southeastern South Dakota. An EF4 tornado severely damaged and destroyed homes in and near Wayne, Nebraska, and caused major damage an industrial site and to a local airport, where several hangars were flattened. Another tornado, rated EF2, severely damaged or destroyed six homes in Macy, Nebraska. The storm system also produced a severe blizzard that impacted South Dakota.

=== October 22 (Australia) ===
A tornado struck the western Victorian town of Ararat at 7:30 pm local time, causing significant damage to residential and commercial structures.

=== October 31 (United States) ===
EFU	EF0	EF1	EF2	EF3	EF4	EF5
0	11	21	1	0	0	0

A small outbreak of mostly weak tornadoes occurred across parts of the Southern and Midwestern United States. An EF2 tornado snapped trees and damaged three homes southwest of Baker, Missouri. An EF1 tornado damaged homes and other buildings in Vandalia, Ohio and eight people at a restaurant suffered minor injuries from broken glass. Overall, the storm system was responsible for a total of 46 tornado reports, 31 of which were confirmed.

== November ==
=== November 4 (Philippines) ===
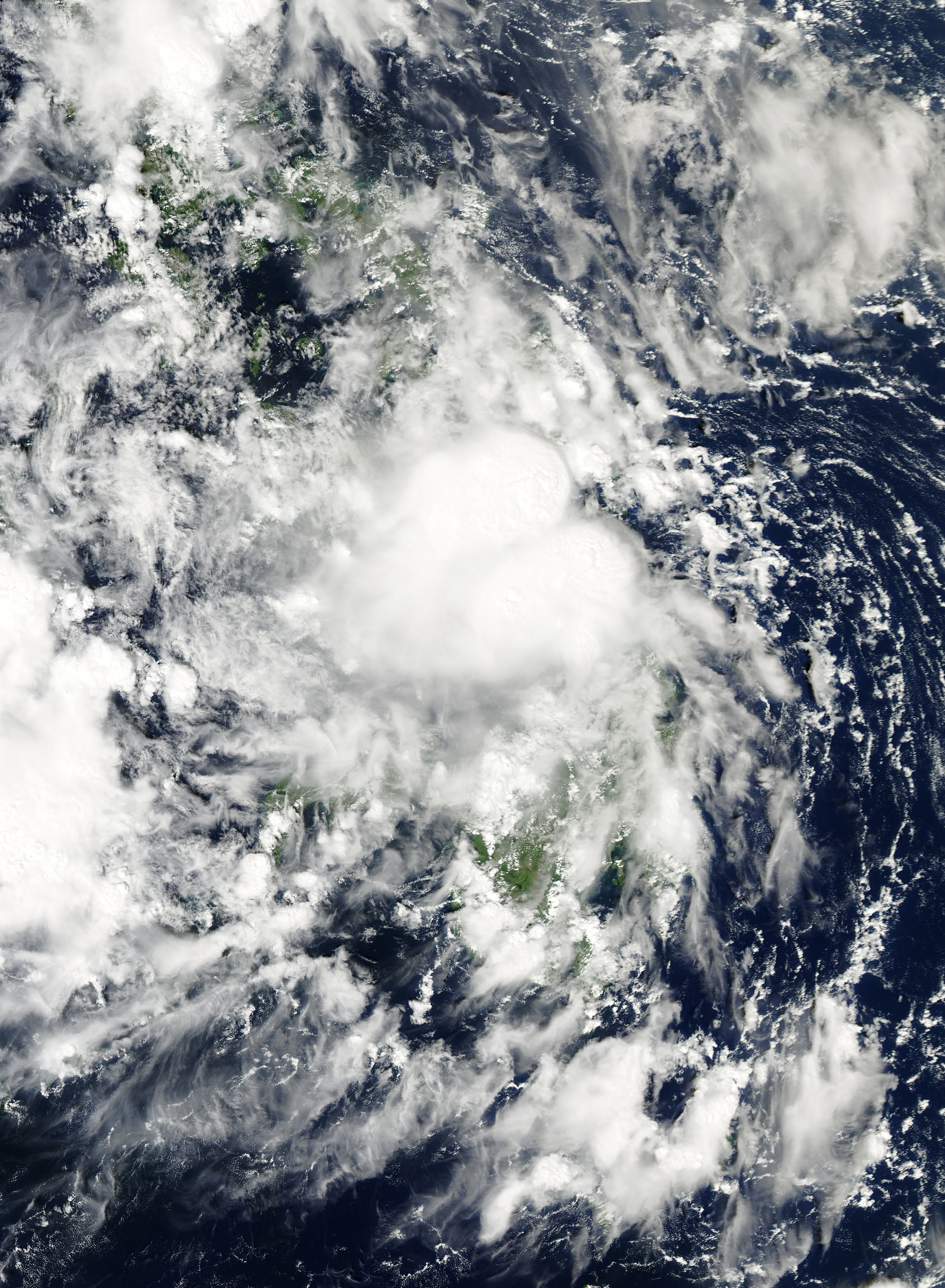
A satellite view of Tropical Depression Wilma (2013) which spawned tornadoes that hit Metro Cebu and Metro Iloilo

A EF2 tornado was influenced by Tropical Depression Wilma (2013) at around 20:00 PhST the tornado struck Metro Cebu where it damaged multiple buildings, including a mall, damaged houses with roofs blown away, uprooted trees and injuring 13 people. It originated from a thunderstorm in Northern Bohol where it developed and crossed the Cebu Straight towards Olango Island before it touched down. The tornado proceeded to head towards Lapu-Lapu City and Mandaue where most of the damages occurred, before it moved north towards the town of Compostela and Danao, later dissipated in Carmen. At 22:00 PhST, another EF1 tornado struck Metro Iloilo where 68 houses were destroyed and 122 others were damaged. Among the towns in Metro Iloilo, Pavia was hit the hardest with 39 houses destroyed and 85 others damaged.

=== November 17 (United States) ===
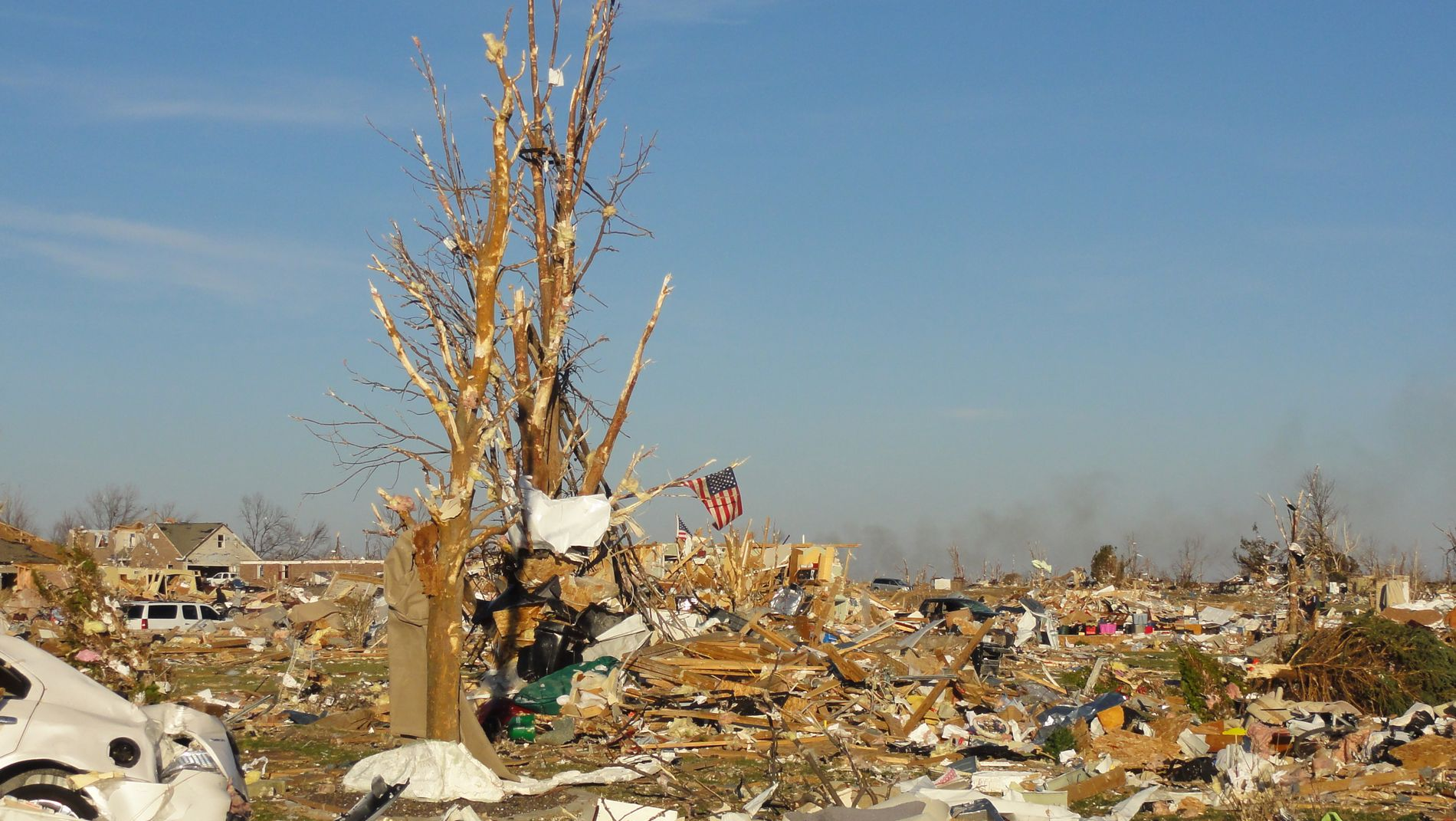
Neighborhood that was completely destroyed by a high-end EF4 tornado in Washington, Illinois.

EFU	EF0	EF1	EF2	EF3	EF4	EF5
0	13	28	23	7	2	0

As a very strong and rapidly deepening storm system encountered an unseasonably warm air mass, a high risk of severe weather was issued by the SPC for November 17 for a large part of the Midwest, for only the second time in 2013 and the first time in November since November 15, 2005. A large outbreak of tornadoes occurred across the Ohio Valley and Great Lakes states, including one high-end EF4 tornado, with estimated winds of up to 190 mph (310 km/h) that struck the city of Washington, Illinois, where three people were killed and 125 others were injured. Another EF4 tornado tracked across parts of Washington County, Illinois, where it completely destroyed a farm house, killing two people inside, and caused damage to several structures in New Minden. Overall, the outbreak resulted in eight tornado related fatalities. Many other tornadoes impacted Kentucky and Indiana, as well as a few in Missouri, Michigan, Ohio, and Tennessee.

=== November 18–23 (Australia) ===
FU	F0	F1	F2	F3	F4	F5
0	3	3	0	0	0	0

Several tornado days occurred in November across eastern Australia. On November 18, an F1 tornado swept through the Sydney suburb of Hornsby, damaging the Westfield shopping centre and train station. The tornado caused eight injuries, five of which occurred when a demountable building flipped at Hornsby Railway Station.

The next day, November 19, the town of Hervey Bay, Queensland was struck by a waterspout which came ashore in Urangan. Houses on one street were severely damaged by winds of up to 100 kilometres per hour (62 mph) an F0.

Four days later, November 23, severe thunderstorms spawned at least 4 tornadoes in the Northern Tablelands region of New South Wales. One tornado destroyed a farmhouse, injuring its owner, and damaged several other buildings north of Guyra, New South Wales. The damage assessment conducted by the Bureau of Meteorology was unable to completely map tornado paths because, access was limited by the terrain and time was a factor. The tornadoes were conservatively rated as two F1s and two F0s.

=== November 23 (Canada) ===
EFU	EF0	EF1	EF2	EF3	EF4	EF5
0	0	1	0	0	0	0

A low topped supercell in southern Ontario produced a brief EF1 tornado in Charleville, despite the presence of below freezing air temperatures, and eyewitness accounts reported snow and graupel with the supercell. In addition, radar data from the nearby Montague, New York, WSR-88D suggested that the storm's precipitation was frozen. The tornado destroyed a portion of a 25 meter tall silo, in addition to damaging trees and a barn.

== December ==
=== December 20–21 (United States) ===
EFU	EF0	EF1	EF2	EF3	EF4	EF5
0	3	7	3	0	0	0

The final tornado event of 2013 was a small outbreak of tornadoes that took place from December 20 to 21. The initial tornadoes on the 20th were weak, with an EF1 in Arkansas, and two EF0s near Jackson, Mississippi. The Storm Prediction Center issued a moderate risk for severe weather the following day, including a risk area with a 15 percent chance for tornadoes in parts of Louisiana, Arkansas, and Mississippi. Later that evening, an EF2 tornado passed near Hughes, Arkansas, destroying several mobile homes, killing one person and injuring three others. Another EF2 that passed near Rena Lara, Mississippi caused an additional fatality in a mobile home. Overall, the outbreak produced 13 tornadoes and resulted in two fatalities.

== See also ==
- Weather of 2013
- Tornado
  - Tornadoes by year
  - Tornado records
  - Tornado climatology
  - Tornado myths
- List of tornado outbreaks
  - List of F5 and EF5 tornadoes
  - List of F4 and EF4 tornadoes
  - List of North American tornadoes and tornado outbreaks
  - List of 21st-century Canadian tornadoes and tornado outbreaks
  - List of European tornadoes and tornado outbreaks
  - List of tornadoes and tornado outbreaks in Asia
  - List of Southern Hemisphere tornadoes and tornado outbreaks
  - List of tornadoes striking downtown areas
  - List of tornadoes with confirmed satellite tornadoes
- Tornado intensity
  - Fujita scale
  - Enhanced Fujita scale
  - International Fujita scale
  - TORRO scale
