= 2013 Granbury tornado =

Extremely destructive EF4 tornado that hit Granbury, Texas in 2013

- View of the tornado near Granbury.

Meteorological history
- Formed: May 15, 2013, 7:58 p.m. CDT (UTC−05:00)
- Dissipated: May 15, 2013, 8:11 p.m. CDT (UTC−05:00)
- Duration: 13 Minutes

EF4 tornado
- on the Enhanced Fujita scale
- Max width: 800 yards (0.45 mi; 0.73 km)
- Path length: 2.75 miles (4.43 km)
- Highest winds: 180 mph (290 km/h)

Overall effects
- Fatalities: 6
- Injuries: 54
- Missing: 7
- Damage: $143 million (2013 USD)
- Areas affected: Granbury, Texas
- Part of the Tornadoes of 2013 and Tornado outbreak of May 15–17, 2013

During the evening hours of May 15, 2013, a violent and deadly EF4 tornado struck the southeastern part of Granbury, Texas. It killed 6 people, making it the deadliest tornado of the Tornado outbreak of May 15–17, 2013 and the deadliest violent tornado in the region since an F4 struck Lancaster, Texas in 1994. It was the strongest tornado of the outbreak, with estimated windspeeds of 180 mph (290 km/h) estimated by NWS Fort Worth.

The tornado touched down at 7:58 pm, dealing minor damage along Cheyenne Trail and began to rapidly intensify as it approached the Rancho Brazos subdivision, where all 6 deaths and $143 million of damage occurred. As the tornado moved into the subdivision it rapidly became violent as it destroyed and in places completely swept multiple homes. EF4 damage was noted to well-built homes on Sundown Court and Fox Hollow Court, with maximum windspeeds of up to 180 miles per hour. The tornado then began to quickly weaken, dealing EF2 damage to trees as it left the subdivision before dissipating near a farmstead along Bob White drive. The tornado tracked 2.75 miles in total and had a maximum width that was estimated to be up to 800 yards.

== Meteorological Synopsis ==
Throughout the night of May 15th 2013, an upper-level shortwave trough moved northeastward from Mexico into the Southern Plains, leading the Storm Prediction Center (SPC) in Norman, Oklahoma, a division of the National Weather Service, to issue a slight risk of severe thunderstorms over northwestern Texas with a threat of large hail and damaging winds. A low-pressure area associated with the trough moved southwest over Oklahoma, producing light to moderate rainfall and non-severe thunderstorms there as it continued into parts of North Texas. The Storm Prediction Center later expanded the slight risk further into Northern and Central Texas, and later into far southern Oklahoma, noting an enhanced risk of a few isolated tornadoes in North Texas.

The atmosphere began to destabilize due to a decrease in cloud cover over western and central Texas that resulted in increased regional temperatures. Combined with wind shear and abundant low-level moisture, a vast unstable air mass formed across North Texas and parts of Central Texas The SPC issued a severe thunderstorm watch from southern Oklahoma to central Texas around 3:00 p.m. CDT.

== Tornado summary ==
The tornado touched down at approximately 7:55 P.M. on Apache Trail Court, where a house located off of Apache Trail had visible damage at EF0 intensity. The tornado moved east-northeast, crossing Lake Granbury and the Brazos River while retaining EF0 intensity as it ran ashore on the far south side of Sundown Trail, tracking through a field before hitting Davis Road where the tornado inflicted damage on electrical transmission lines located near Rhea Court at EF0 intensity before turning to the north. The tornado then crossed De Cordova Ranch Road, entering the Rancho Brazos subdivision where all six deaths would occur, rapidly intensifying to EF3 strength as a manufactured home located off of De Cordova Ranch was completely destroyed and thrown over 100 yards. The tornado retained EF3 intensity while crossing Canyon Road and South Sagecrest Court, collapsing the walls and upper stories of multiple homes. The tornado then tracked through Fox Hollow Court, where it briefly strengthened to low-end EF4 intensity as a two-story, well-plated home was completely destroyed with the concrete foundation swept clean of any debris.

The tornado then weakened back down to EF3 intensity while crossing Ranchview Drive, where a two-story home was completely destroyed at high-end EF3 intensity, trees were debarked, and another manufactured home located nearby was destroyed at high-end EF2 intensity. The tornado continued to move northward, hitting Highview Court and the northern edge of Echo Trail at EF3 intensity. The tornado reached EF4 intensity a second time on Sundown Court, where two multi-story houses, including one that was properly secured with anchor bolts, were destroyed and swept clean of debris. A poorly anchored home on the same street was damaged at high-end EF3 intensity as all of its walls were collapsed. It then tracked out of populated areas, heading northward and snapping tree trunks at EF1 intensity.

As the tornado continued tracking northward, it struck a barn at EF1 intensity, causing heavy damage. Another farm nearby lost its roof, a nearby tree was debarked at EF2 intensity, 3 horses were thrown and killed, and several nearby trees sustained EF0 and EF1 damage.

The tornado continued moving northward before narrowly avoiding a single home located on Acton Highway. It then abruptly turned to the east, inflicting EF2 damage on trees as it began to run almost parallel to Bob White Drive while weakening to EF0 intensity. Multiple farm buildings sustained EF0 damage on this road, and a manufactured home was damaged at EF1 intensity before the tornado lifted north of Bob White Drive. In total, it tracked around 2.75 miles and had a maximum width of 800 yards.

== Aftermath ==
=== Damage ===
97 of the 110 houses and trailer homes in the Rancho Brazos subdivision were either heavily damaged or destroyed; 19 were completely destroyed, while 17 sustained critical structural damage. 17 mobile homes were also destroyed. Damage costs were estimated to be $143 million. Around 20,000 buildings were left without power in Granbury and surrounding areas as a direct result of the tornado. Hundreds of people were left homeless after the tornado.

=== Cleanup efforts ===
Many volunteers arrived to help rebuild some of the destroyed homes, supported by organizations such as Habitat for Humanity and the Salvation Army. Additionally, The General Motors foundation donated 500,000 dollars to reconstruction efforts. Texas Governor Rick Perry visited after the tornado, expressing his support for the survivors of the tornado and local emergency services. Tornado preparedness significantly improved after the tornado, as 50 homes became registered storm shelter owners by November 2015 and many homes were rebuilt with strong interior rooms. 53 of the families had stayed to rebuild and 19 more families moved into the Rancho Brazos subdivision in the years after the tornado.

=== Fatalities ===
Six were killed and an estimated 37 were injured in the immediate aftermath of the tornado, with this estimate later being revised to 54 injuries. 11 people were initially declared missing, all of which lived or were in the Rancho Brazos subdivision, although that number was later dropped to 7. All of the dead were adults sheltered in mobile homes.

== See also ==
- 2015 Garland tornado, another EF4 that struck areas near Dallas 2 years later
- List of F4, EF4, and IF4 tornadoes
- List of F4 and EF4 tornadoes (2010–2019)
- List of Texas tornadoes
