= Tornado outbreak of May 15–17, 2013 =

Tornado outbreak in the United States

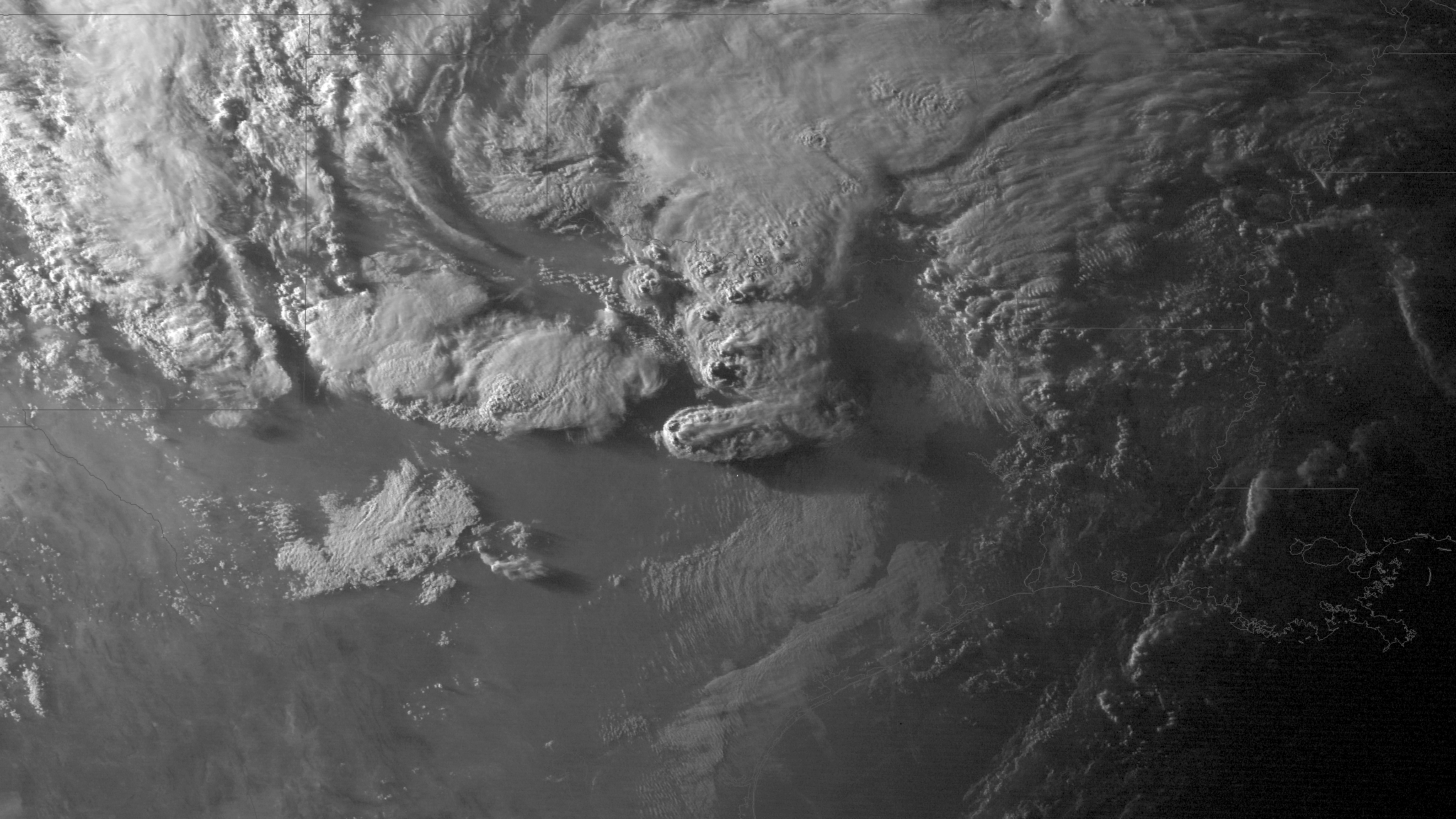
- Satellite image of supercell clusters in the Dallas–Fort Worth area during the evening of May 15.

Meteorological history
- Formed: May 15, 2013
- Dissipated: May 17, 2013

Tornado outbreak
- Tornadoes: 31
- Max. rating: EF4 tornado
- Duration: 1 day, 21 hours, 13 minutes
- Highest winds: 180 mph (290 km/h) (Granbury, Texas EF4 on May 15)
- Largest hail: 4 in (10 cm) in diameter (Mineral Wells, Texas on May 15)

Overall effects
- Fatalities: 6
- Injuries: 63
- Damage: US$272 million
- Part of the Tornadoes of 2013

A small but damaging tornado outbreak impacted northern Texas, south-central Oklahoma, northern Louisiana, and northern Alabama in mid-May 2013. The outbreak was the result of an upper-level shortwave trough that tracked across the Southern Plains of the United States. An associated low-pressure area and atmospheric instability resulted in the formation of tornadoes across northern Texas and Oklahoma on May 15. Afterwards the storm system weakened as it tracked eastward, though six additional tornadoes were reported in Texas, Louisiana, and Alabama in the two days following May 15. Over a period of nearly two days, the storm system produced 26 tornadoes in four states. The strongest of these was an EF4 tornado which struck Hood County, Texas on May 15. However, on May 16 and May 17 no tornadoes were confirmed to have been stronger than EF1 intensity. In addition to tornadoes, large hail was reported, peaking at 4 in (10 cm) in diameter near Mineral Wells, Texas on May 15.

The EF4 tornado in Hood County, Texas, accounted for all six deaths caused by the severe storms, making it the first deadly tornado event in Texas since the 2007 Piedras Negras-Eagle Pass tornadoes. An additional 63 people were injured, many of which were due to the same EF4 tornado. A second tornado, rated EF3, was similarly damaging and impacted areas southwest of Cleburne, Texas, injuring seven. Damage across the four states due to the storm system reached roughly $272 million in damage.

== Meteorological synopsis ==
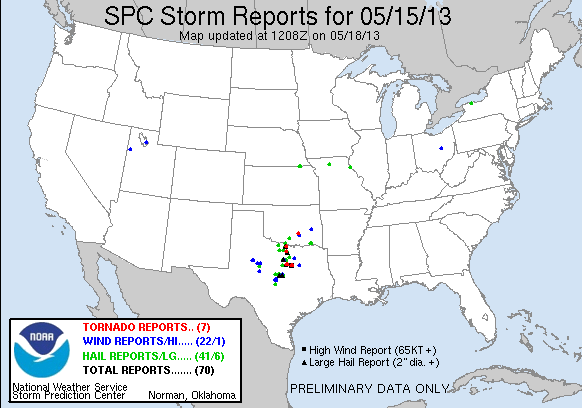
Preliminary map of tornado, wind, and hail reports associated with the storm.

The outbreak was caused by an upper-level shortwave trough that moved northeastward from Mexico into the Southern Plains states during the nighttime the morning of May 15. The Storm Prediction Center (SPC) in Norman, Oklahoma, a division of the National Weather Service, initially issued a slight risk of severe thunderstorms early that morning over northwestern Texas, for a threat of large hail and damaging winds. A low-pressure area associated with the trough moved over Oklahoma that day, producing light to moderate rainfall and non-severe thunderstorms across that state into parts of North Texas. Later forecasts expanded the slight risk further into northern and Central Texas, and later into far southern Oklahoma, and indicated an enhanced risk of a few isolated tornadoes in North Texas.

The atmosphere began to destabilize due to a decrease in cloud cover over western and central Texas; the sunshine and heating, combined with sufficient wind shear and abundant low-level moisture, combined to produce a very unstable air mass. The SPC issued a severe thunderstorm watch from southern Oklahoma to central Texas that afternoon around 3:00 p.m. CDT. Supercells broke out in parts of northwestern Texas during the late afternoon hours, one of which developed the first tornado of the day at 5:38 p.m., near Belcherville in Montague County. A second tornado spawned by the same storm, rated as an EF1, touched down near Lake Amon G. Carter, damaging four homes and destroying one. As forecasters realized that conditions now favored tornadic activity, the SPC issued a tornado watch from far southern Oklahoma into central Texas at 6 p.m. CDT, replacing parts of the original severe thunderstorm watch.

At 7:13 p.m. CDT, storm spotters reported a large tornado on the ground near Millsap in Parker County, which caused roof damage to several homes in the town. This tornado remained on the ground as another tornado began to intensify near Mile Marker 409 on I-20 southeast of Weatherford, Texas at 7:19 p.m. NWS doppler radar briefly detected both tornadoes, indicating the storm was a cyclical supercell (a type of supercell that can produce successive tornadoes), before the Millsap tornado finally dissipated.

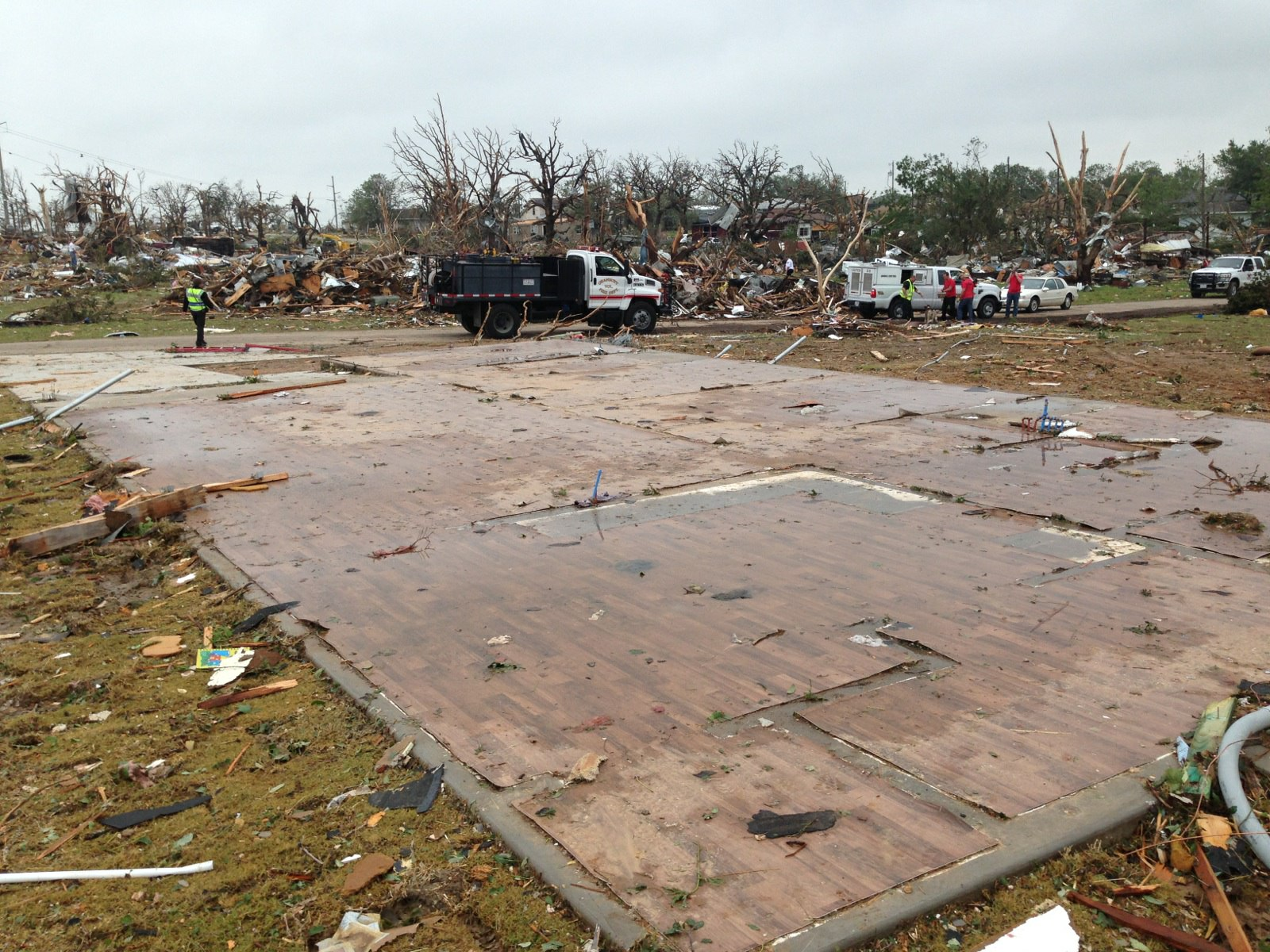
A home in Granbury which was completely swept away by the EF4 Granbury, Texas tornado.

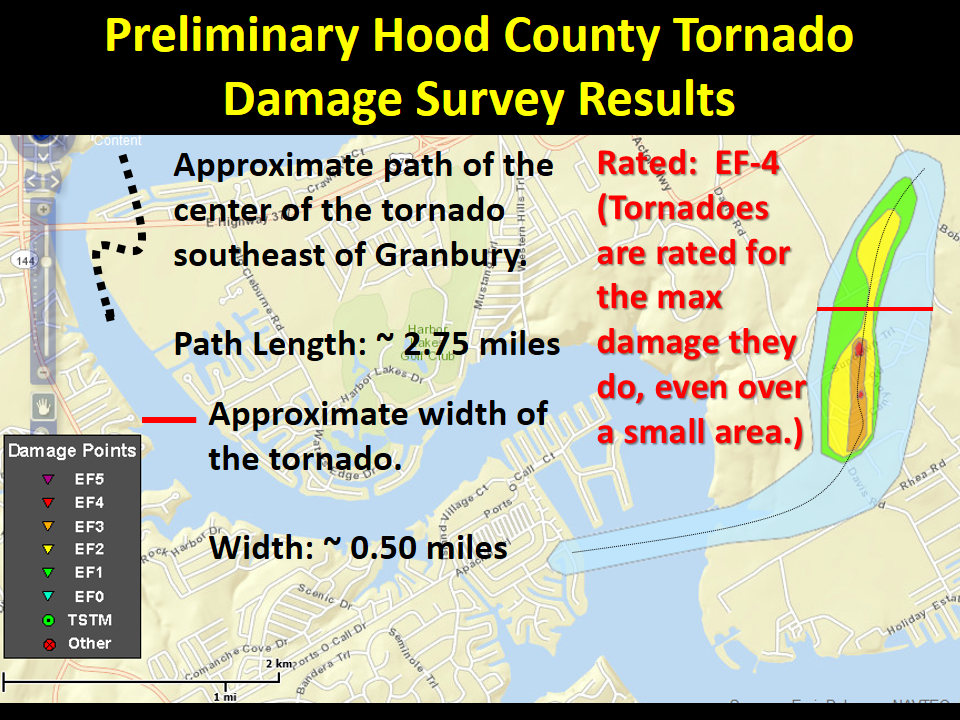
Survey analysis of the May 15, 2013 EF4 Granbury, Texas tornado detailing the tornado's track.

An EF4 tornado hit the town of Granbury, Texas in Hood County around 8 p.m. CDT, damaging or destroying around 100 homes and killing six people, with the most severe damage occurring in the Rancho Brazos neighborhood; the Granbury storm was the first violent tornado to hit North Texas since an F4 tornado killed three people in Lancaster in Dallas County on April 25, 1994. The supercell that produced the Granbury tornado later spawned a very large EF3 tornado that hit the Fort Worth suburb of Cleburne in Johnson County around 9:30 p.m. CDT, producing its most significant damage just east of Lake Pat Cleburne. The last of the outbreak touched down at 12:19 a.m., producing EF1 damage in the Ellis County town of Ennis, Texas, south-southeast of Dallas. In total, the system produced at least 16 tornadoes that afternoon and evening across north and central Texas, from Montague to Coryell counties.

The system continued to spin up tornadoes on May 16 and 17, though not of the same severity as the storms that occurred on the 15th, each causing only minor to moderate damage of EF0 and EF1 intensity. Four additional tornadoes occurred near the Shreveport metropolitan area on May 16, two of which touched down near Waskom, Texas, and two in Caddo Parish near the towns of Greenwood and Stonewall, Louisiana. Two short-lived tornadoes touched down in Limestone County, Alabama on May 17, causing scattered damage to trees, roofs and a barn.

== Confirmed tornadoes ==
Confirmed tornadoes by Enhanced Fujita rating
EFU	EF0	EF1	EF2	EF3	EF4	EF5	Total
0	19	10	0	1	1	0	31

=== May 15 event ===
List of confirmed tornadoes – Wednesday, May 15, 2013 (Note: All dates are based on the local time zone where the tornado touched down; however, all times are in Coordinated Universal Time for consistency.)
EF#	Location	County / Parish	State	Start Coord.	Time (UTC)	Path length	Max width	Summary
EF0	WNW of Belcherville	Montague	TX	33.814°N 97.881°W	2233 – 2236	1.11 mi (1.79 km)	70 yd (64 m)	A brief tornado caused damage to a ranch.
EF0	SW of Priddy	Mills	TX	31.655°N 98.58°W	2314 – 2318	3.42 mi (5.50 km)	50 yd (46 m)	This tornado remained over open fields and downed several trees.
EF0	WNW of Ada	Pontotoc	OK	34.7805°N 96.7083°W	2334 – 2335	0.5 mi (0.80 km)	50 yd (46 m)	A mobile home was damaged and several trees were downed.
EF0	SSE of Mineral Wells	Palo Pinto	TX	32.771°N 98.072°W	2341 – 2342	0.3 mi (0.48 km)	50 yd (46 m)	A brief tornado caused no damage.
EF1	NE of Nocona	Montague	TX	33.845°N 97.683°W	2350 – 2355	1.01 mi (1.63 km)	200 yd (180 m)	A mobile home slid off of its foundation, a few site-built homes were damaged, and several trees were downed near Lake Nocona.
EF1	WSW of Sunset	Montague	TX	33.434°N 97.89°W	2351 – 2358	3.63 mi (5.84 km)	240 yd (220 m)	Five homes were damaged, one of which was destroyed, a golf course clubhouse was destroyed, and many trees were downed south of Lake Amon G. Carter. One person was injured.
EF1	Southern Millsap	Parker	TX	32.747°N 98.0302°W	0003 – 0019	1.95 mi (3.14 km)	400 yd (370 m)	Several homes and barns were damaged and power lines were downed.
EF0	WSW of Illinois Bend	Montague	TX	33.841°N 97.589°W	0018 – 0020	0.94 mi (1.51 km)	150 yd (140 m)	A brief tornado damaged a home and downed several trees northwest of St. Jo.
EF0	E of Millsap	Parker	TX	32.72°N 97.942°W	0022 – 0025	0.49 mi (0.79 km)	70 yd (64 m)	A brief tornado north of Brock remained over open fields and caused no damage.
EF0	NNW of Bridgeport	Wise	TX	33.408°N 97.6719°W	0035 – 0037	0.69 mi (1.11 km)	25 yd (23 m)	A brief tornado north of Alvord stayed mostly over open land and only downed a few trees.
EF0	E of Dennis	Parker	TX	32.639°N 97.806°W	0053 – 0056	1.46 mi (2.35 km)	200 yd (180 m)	Numerous barns and mobile homes were damaged or destroyed and numerous trees were downed south of Weatherford and southwest of Annetta.
EF4	Southeastern Granbury	Hood	TX	32.412°N 97.754°W	0058 – 0111	2.5 mi (4.0 km)	400 yd (370 m)	6 deaths – See article on this tornado – 54 people were injured.
EF0	SSW of Aledo	Parker	TX	32.566°N 97.675°W	0105 – 0107	0.12 mi (0.19 km)	25 yd (23 m)	A brief tornado caused no known damage.
EF1	Pecan Plantation	Hood, Johnson	TX	32.356°N 97.633°W	0109 – 0121	2.44 mi (3.93 km)	300 yd (270 m)	This tornado produced mostly minor damage in the Pecan Plantation community before crossing the Brazos River and dissipating.
EF0	NW of Cresson	Johnson	TX	32.555°N 97.664°W	0119 – 0122	0.19 mi (0.31 km)	30 yd (27 m)	A brief tornado damaged a billboard and a few farm buildings.
EF0	NNE of Evant (1st tornado)	Hamilton	TX	31.512°N 98.135°W	0134 – 0136	0.21 mi (0.34 km)	30 yd (27 m)	This was the first of two brief tornadoes that occurred simultaneously, although no damage was reported.
EF0	NNE of Evant (2nd tornado)	Hamilton	TX	31.502°N 98.145°W	0135 – 0137	1.04 mi (1.67 km)	40 yd (37 m)	This was the second of two brief tornadoes that occurred simultaneously, although no damage was reported.
EF3	SSW of Cleburne	Johnson	TX	32.255°N 97.495°W	0212 – 0223	7.79 mi (12.54 km)	1,733 yd (1,585 m)	See section on this tornado – Seven people were injured.
EF0	ESE of Cleburne	Johnson	TX	32.311°N 97.297°W	0245 – 0249	1.28 mi (2.06 km)	400 yd (370 m)	Five manufactured homes suffered roof damage and several trees were downed.

=== May 16 event ===
List of confirmed tornadoes – Thursday, May 16, 2013
EF#	Location	County / Parish	State	Start Coord.	Time (UTC)	Path length	Max width	Summary
EF1	Ennis	Ellis	TX	32.325°N 96.631°W	0505 – 0512	6.17 mi (9.93 km)	400 yd (370 m)	A total of 17 homes were damaged, with 4 being destroyed. Another 55 commercial properties were damaged, with 20 suffering severe damage. One person was injured.
EF1	W of Waskom	Harrison	TX	32.4911°N 94.1534°W	1920 – 1924	1.43 mi (2.30 km)	500 yd (460 m)	Several metal buildings were damaged and trees were downed. One person was injured.
EF1	SSE of Waskom	Harrison	TX	32.4636°N 94.0565°W	1934 – 1936	0.42 mi (0.68 km)	200 yd (180 m)	A tornado caused minor damage to metal buildings, construction equipment, and a few houses. Several trees were downed as well.
EF1	ESE of Greenwood	Caddo	LA	32.4468°N 93.9625°W	1939 – 1950	5.23 mi (8.42 km)	1,400 yd (1,300 m)	Many trees were downed, several of which caused damage to mobile homes and site-built homes. One person was injured.
EF1	NNE of Stonewall	Caddo, DeSoto	LA	32.3345°N 93.8128°W	2005 – 2009	2.48 mi (3.99 km)	350 yd (320 m)	A brief tornado near a broad area of straight-line winds downed several trees.

=== May 17 event ===
List of confirmed tornadoes – Friday, May 17, 2013
EF#	Location	County / Parish	State	Start Coord.	Time (UTC)	Path length	Max width	Summary
EF0	S of Athens	Limestone	AL	34.76°N 86.9748°W	1900 – 1907	2.04 mi (3.28 km)	50 yd (46 m)	An intermittent tornado downed trees and shifted wooden front porch pillars at a house. It then skipped northeast, where it ripped metal signs and siding off of a metal pole before dissipating.
EF0	SW of Ardmore	Limestone	AL	34.9546°N 86.8794°W	1945 – 1946	0.15 mi (0.24 km)	50 yd (46 m)	A very brief tornado caused roof damage to several houses and a barn. One brick house sustained structural damage to its bricks and foundation and several trees were downed.
EF0	N of Crawford	Dawes	NE	42.7813°N 103.4°W	2154 – 2200	2.67 mi (4.30 km)	50 yd (46 m)	No damage was reported.
EF0	WSW of Windom	Cottonwood	MN	43.83°N 95.215°W	2245 – 2247	0.5 mi (0.80 km)	50 yd (46 m)	A brief tornado caused no damage.
EF0	S of Miloma	Jackson	MN	43.72°N 95.175°W	2310 – 2312	0.5 mi (0.80 km)	50 yd (46 m)	A brief tornado caused no damage.
EF0	NW of Eliasville (1st tornado)	Young	TX	32.99°N 98.81°W	0034 – 0037	1.02 mi (1.64 km)	75 yd (69 m)	A tornado occurred over open fields and caused no damage.
EF1	NW of Eliasville (2nd tornado)	Young	TX	32.999°N 98.784°W	0050 – 0053	3.14 mi (5.05 km)	20 yd (18 m)	A house suffered significant damage to its roof and back porch.

=== Granbury, Texas ===
Granbury, Texas
Meteorological history
- Formed: May 15, 2013, 7:58 p.m. CDT (UTC−05:00)
- Dissipated: May 15, 2013, 8:11 p.m. CDT (UTC−05:00)
- Duration: 13 Minutes

EF4 tornado
- on the Enhanced Fujita scale
- Highest winds: 180 mph (290 km/h)

Overall effects
- Fatalities: 6
- Injuries: 54
- Missing: 7
- Damage: $143 million (2013 USD)
- Areas affected: Granbury, Texas

This violent, deadly tornado touched down on Apache Trail Court at EF0 intensity, dealing minor damage to homes before crossing Lake Granbury and hitting electrical lines at EF0 intensity. The tornado then began to rapidly intensify as it reached De Cordova Ranch Road where it would rapidly intensify as it completely destroyed a manufactured home, moving into the Ranchos Brazos subdivision and across Canyon Road and Sagecrest court, collapsing the walls of homes at EF3 intensity before reaching EF4 intensity for the first time as it destroyed a well-built home. The tornado would then weaken slightly back to EF3 intensity as it crossed Ranchview Drive, Highview Court and Echo Trail, completely sweeping mobile homes and collapsing multiple frame homes before reaching Sundown Court where two two-story well-built homes, at least one of which was properly secured with anchor bolts, were completely swept away.

The tornado would continue across farmland, destroying trees and a barn at EF1 intensity before intensifying to EF2 strength as it debarked multiple trees and ripped the roof off of a barn house. The tornado would continue to damage trees at EF0-EF1 intensity before reaching EF2 intensity again as more trees were debarked before rapidly weakening and dealing its last damage at EF1 intensity on Bob White Drive where multiple farm buildings suffered minor damage and a manufactured home was damage as well.

This tornado, which was the deadliest tornado of the outbreak and the deadliest violent tornado in the region since an F4 hit Lancaster, Texas in 1994, destroyed 110 homes throughout its path, 97 of which were heavily damaged, as well as 17 mobile homes, totaling $143 million in damage. In combination with the Cleburne tornado, 20,000 buildings were left without power. Six people were killed, 54 were injured, and 7 were declared missing, all of which were adults sheltered in mobile homes.

=== Cleburne, Texas ===
Cleburne, Texas
Meteorological history
- Formed: May 15, 2013, 8:12 p.m. CDT (UTC−05:00)
- Dissipated: May 15, 2013, 8:23 p.m. CDT (UTC−05:00)
- Duration: 11 Minutes

EF3 tornado
- on the Enhanced Fujita scale
- Highest winds: 150 mph (240 km/h)

Overall effects
- Fatalities: 0
- Injuries: 7
- Damage: $124 million (2013 USD)
- Areas affected: Cleburne, Texas

This strong, nearly mile-wide tornado touched down on FM 1434 at EF0 intensity, causing minor branch damage to trees as it paralleled FM 143. The tornado would maintain EF0 intensity as it damaged a small metal building system before it began to rapidly intensify to EF2 strength as a home's roof was completely removed. The tornado would then weaken to EF1 intensity as it damaged Metal Building Systems and a manufactured home along West Country Road, Country Road 1112 and Shoreview Drive, where the tornado briefly reached EF1 intensity as tree trunks were snapped.

The tornado then crossed Lake Pat Cleburne, reaching EF2 intensity for a second time as four homes suffered damage to roofs and exterior walls, some of which collapsed. The tornado briefly weakened to EF1 strength as tree trunks were snapped before the tornado briefly reached peak EF3 intensity and size as a home had all of its walls collapsed except for small interior rooms on Old Foamy Road. The tornado then entered urban regions of Cleburne at EF1 intensity as a large swath of home and power line damage occurred. The tornado finally briefly intensified to EF2 strength as a row of homes suffered roof and exterior wall damage on South Nolan River Boulevard before the tornado suddenly lifted next to the Nolan River Mall.

This tornado injured 7 and caused $124 million in damage throughout its nearly 8-mile path, damaging 150 homes and completely destroying 50. The tornado, in combination with the Granbury tornado, left over 20,000 buildings without power. The tornado was the second strongest and the largest of the outbreak, with winds estimated up to 150 miles per hour and a peak width of 1 mile.

== See also ==
- List of North American tornadoes and tornado outbreaks
- April 1994 tornado outbreak
- Tornado outbreak of April 3, 2012
- Tornado outbreak of May 18–21, 2013
