= Tallachula Creek =

Stream in Mississippi, United States

Coordinates: 32.6131931°N 88.8469953°W

Tallachula Creek is a stream in the U.S. state of Mississippi.

Tallachula is a name derived from the Choctaw language purported to mean either "marked palmetto" or "marked rock". Variant names are "Conda Creek", "Tali Chulok Creek", and "Tallachuluk Creek".
