= Warsaw, Texas =

- Unincorporated community
- Location within Texas Location within the United States
- Coordinates: 32°33′00″N 96°25′13″W
- Country: United States
- State: Texas
- County: Kaufman
- Elevation: 377 ft (115 m)
- Time zone: UTC-6 (Central (CST))
  - Summer (DST): UTC-5 (CDT)
- GNIS feature ID: 1349502

Warsaw is an unincorporated community in Kaufman County, located in the U.S. state of Texas. According to the Handbook of Texas, the community had a population of 58 in 2000. It is located within the Dallas/Fort Worth Metroplex.

== History ==
The area in what is known as Warsaw today was first settled sometime before 1840 and was originally called Warsaw Prairie. A post office was established at Warsaw in 1847 and remained in operation until 1858. The population of Warsaw was 15 in 1936 and had two businesses. It boomed to 58 residents from 1988 through 2000.

== Geography ==
Warsaw is located on Farm to Market Road 148 near Warsaw Creek, 7 mi (11 km) southwest of Kaufman in southwestern Kaufman County.

== Education ==
Warsaw is served by the Crandall Independent School District, with elementary students attending W.A. Martin Elementary School in Crandall.
