= Oak Ridge, Kaufman County, Texas =

- Town
- Location of Oak Ridge in Kaufman County, Texas
- Coordinates: 32°38′05″N 96°15′42″W
- Country: United States
- State: Texas
- Counties: Kaufman

Area
  - Total: 3.06 sq mi (7.93 km^{2})
  - Land: 3.03 sq mi (7.85 km^{2})
  - Water: 0.027 sq mi (0.07 km^{2})
- Elevation: 430 ft (130 m)

Population (2020)
  - Total: 771
  - Density: 254/sq mi (98.2/km^{2})
- Time zone: UTC-6 (Central (CST))
  - Summer (DST): UTC-5 (CDT)
- FIPS code: 48-53160
- GNIS feature ID: 2413065
- Website: www.cityofoakridgetx.com

Oak Ridge is a town in Kaufman County, Texas, United States. The population was 771 at the 2020 census, up from 495 at the 2010 census.

== Geography ==
Oak Ridge is located in north-central Kaufman County along Texas State Highway 34. It is 6 miles (10 km) northeast of Kaufman, the county seat, and the same distance south of Terrell.

According to the United States Census Bureau, the town has a total area of 3.8 square miles (9.8 km^{2}), of which 0.05 square miles (0.13 km^{2}), or 1.38%, are water.

== Demographics ==
Historical population
Census	Pop.	Note	%±
1980	183		—
1990	268		46.4%
2000	400		49.3%
2010	495		23.8%
2020	771		55.8%
U.S. Decennial Census; 2020 Census

As of the census of 2000, there were 400 people, 148 households, and 121 families residing in the town. The population density was 178.8 inhabitants per square mile (69.0/km^{2}). There were 152 housing units at an average density of 67.9 per square mile (26.2/km^{2}). The racial makeup of the town was 89.00% White, 6.00% African American, 4.00% from other races, and 1.00% from two or more races. Hispanic or Latino of any race were 7.25% of the population.

There were 148 households, out of which 27.7% had children under the age of 18 living with them, 75.7% were married couples living together, 4.7% had a female householder with no husband present, and 17.6% were non-families. 16.2% of all households were made up of individuals, and 2.7% had someone living alone who was 65 years of age or older. The average household size was 2.70 and the average family size was 2.99.

In the town, the population was spread out, with 23.8% under the age of 18, 4.5% from 18 to 24, 28.8% from 25 to 44, 27.5% from 45 to 64, and 15.5% who were 65 years of age or older. The median age was 41 years. For every 100 females, there were 91.4 males. For every 100 females age 18 and over, there were 95.5 males.

The median income for a household in the town was $53,958, and the median income for a family was $57,500. Males had a median income of $33,250 versus $22,083 for females. The per capita income for the town was $23,035. About 4.0% of families and 5.3% of the population were below the poverty line, including 3.6% of those under age 18 and 7.8% of those age 65 or over.

== Education ==
The town is divided between the Kaufman Independent School District and the Terrell Independent School District. All of the Kaufman ISD schools are in the city of Kaufman, and all of the Terrell ISD schools are in the city of Terrell.
