= Abner, Texas =

- Unincorporated community
- Location within Texas Location within the United States
- Coordinates: 32°37′40″N 96°11′30″W
- Country: United States
- State: Texas
- County: Kaufman
- Elevation: 535 ft (163 m)
- Time zone: UTC-6 (Central (CST))
  - Summer (DST): UTC-5 (CDT)
- GNIS feature ID: 1384213

Abner is an unincorporated community in Kaufman County, located in the U.S. state of Texas. It is located within the Dallas/Fort Worth Metroplex.

== History ==
The community was initially known as Johnson's Point starting in 1871, named after Abner Johnson, who settled the area in the 1840s after piloting a keelboat on the Trinity River two years prior. A post office under that name opened in 1871, but only lasted for two years, giving up its mail service to Terrell. The community changed its name to Abner in 1885, when a new post office opened, remaining open through 1903. After that, mail was sent from Kaufman. The community had 25 residents, as well as a barber, two doctors, and a general store in 1890. It gained ten more residents six years later.

== Geography ==
Abner is located on Farm to Market Road 2727, 7 mi (11 km) northeast of Kaufman in east-central Kaufman County.

== Education ==
Abner's first school district, named Johnson's Point, was established in 1885 by the Kaufman County Commissioner's Court. It joined the Kaufman Independent School District in 1949.
