= Poetry, Texas =

Town in Kaufman and Hunt counties, Texas

Coordinates: 32°50′12″N 96°14′52″W

Poetry is a town in Kaufman and Hunt counties, Texas, United States. It is located at the intersection of Farm to Market Roads 986 and 1565, approximately six miles north of Terrell. The population, as of 2020, is estimated to be 2,069.

Originally known as Turner's Point, a post office and school were established in 1858. In 1876, the community was renamed Poetry. The new name was suggested by local merchant Maston Ussery, who said that the area in springtime reminded him of a poem. Poetry's population peaked at around 234 in 1904. Its post office closed in 1905 and service was consolidated within nearby Terrell. A 1984 incorporation vote was approved by local residents but was invalidated by the Kaufman County Commissioners Court due to technicalities. Today, Poetry is a widely dispersed, lightly populated community.

Public education in the community of Poetry is provided by Terrell Independent School District and Quinlan Independent School District. A private school, Poetry Christian School, also operates in the town.

In the 2020 election, the residents of Poetry again voted to incorporate.
