= C. J. Wilson (safety) =

American football player (born 1985)

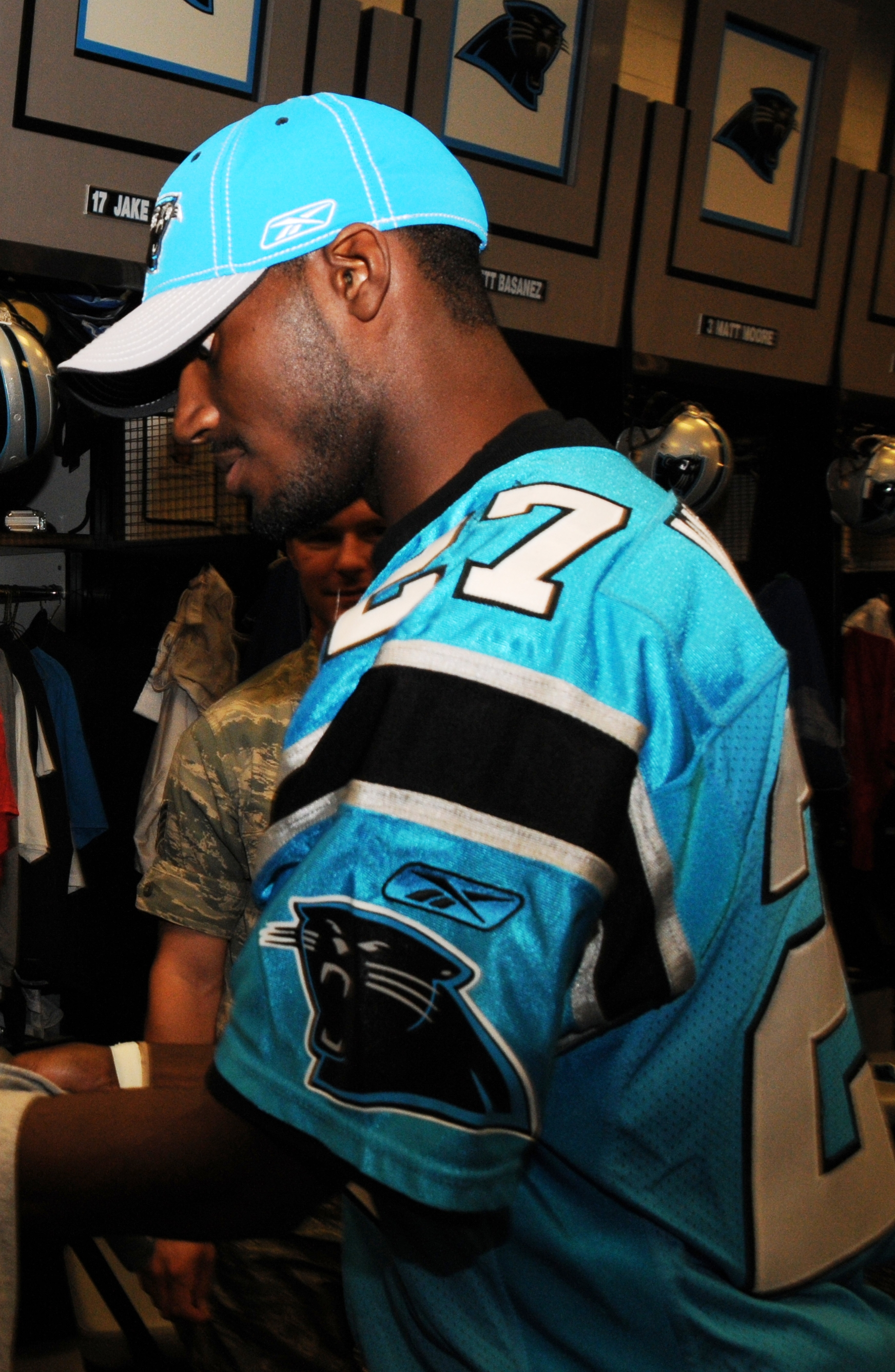
- Wilson in 2008

No. 27
- Position: Cornerback

Personal information
- Born: April 2, 1985 (age 41); Dallas, Texas, U.S.
- Listed height: 6 ft 1 in (1.85 m)
- Listed weight: 195 lb (88 kg)

Career information
- High school: Terrell (Terrell, Texas)
- College: Baylor
- NFL draft: 2007: 7th round, 226th overall pick

Career history
- Carolina Panthers (2007–2010); Dallas Cowboys (2011–2012)*
- * Offseason or practice squad member only

Awards and highlights
- 2× Second-team All-Big 12 (2005, 2006)

Career NFL statistics
- Games played: 23
- Total tackles: 27
- Fumble recoveries: 1
- Pass deflections: 4
- Stats at Pro Football Reference

Gerald Dwayne Wilson (born April 2, 1985) is an American former professional football player who was a cornerback in the National Football League (NFL) for the Carolina Panthers. He was selected by the Panthers in the seventh round of the 2007 NFL draft. He played college football for the Baylor Bears. He was also a member of the Dallas Cowboys.

== Early life ==
Wilson attended Terrell High School. As a senior, he contributed to the team having a 9-3 record, while making 37 tackles, 6 interceptions and 7 passes defensed. He was named All-district, 16-4A Defensive Player of the Year and the Terrell Tribune Co-Athlete of the Year.

He was a two-time All-district selection in basketball. He was the district champion and a regional qualifier in the high jump as a senior.

== College career ==
Wilson accepted a football scholarship from Baylor University. As a true freshman, he appeared in 12 games as a backup cornerback, making 13 tackles.

As a sophomore, he appeared in 11 games with two starts, collecting 22 tackles (eleventh on the team), 3 passes defensed, one forced fumble and one fumble recovery.

As a junior, he started 11 games, posting 45 tackles (seventh on the team), 5 interceptions (tied for the lead in the conference), 5 passes defensed and one fumble recovery.

As a senior, he started 12 games, making 59 tackles, 4 interceptions (led the team), 6 passes defensed. He returned one interception for a 52-yard touchdown against Northwestern State University.

He finished his college career after playing in 46 games with 25 starts, 139 tackles, 9 interceptions, 14 passes defensed, one forced fumble and 2 fumble recoveries.

== Professional career ==
=== Carolina Panthers ===
Wilson was selected by the Carolina Panthers in the seventh round (226th overall) of the 2007 NFL draft. He was waived on September 2 and signed to the practice squad to September 4. On November 14, he was promoted to the active roster. He appeared in 4 games, making 2 defensive tackles and 2 special teams tackles.

In 2008, he appeared in 4 games and was declared inactive in 12 contests. He had 3 tackles and one pass defensed.

In 2009, he appeared in 7 games and was declared inactive in 9 contests. He had 7 tackles, 2 passes defensed and one special teams tackle.

On September 4, 2010, he was released. On September 17, he was re-signed. He appeared in 8 games and was declared inactive in 7 contests. He registered 8 tackles, one pass defensed, 3 special teams tackles and one fumble recovery. On July 30, 2011, he was re-signed. On September 3, he was released.

=== Dallas Cowboys ===
On December 13, 2011, he was signed by the Dallas Cowboys to their practice squad. On August 27, 2012, he was released.

== Coaching career ==
He is currently the football coach for Polytechnic High School in Fort Worth.

== Personal life ==
Wilson's cousin, Lenzy Pipkins, also plays football.
