= Kemp, Texas =

- City
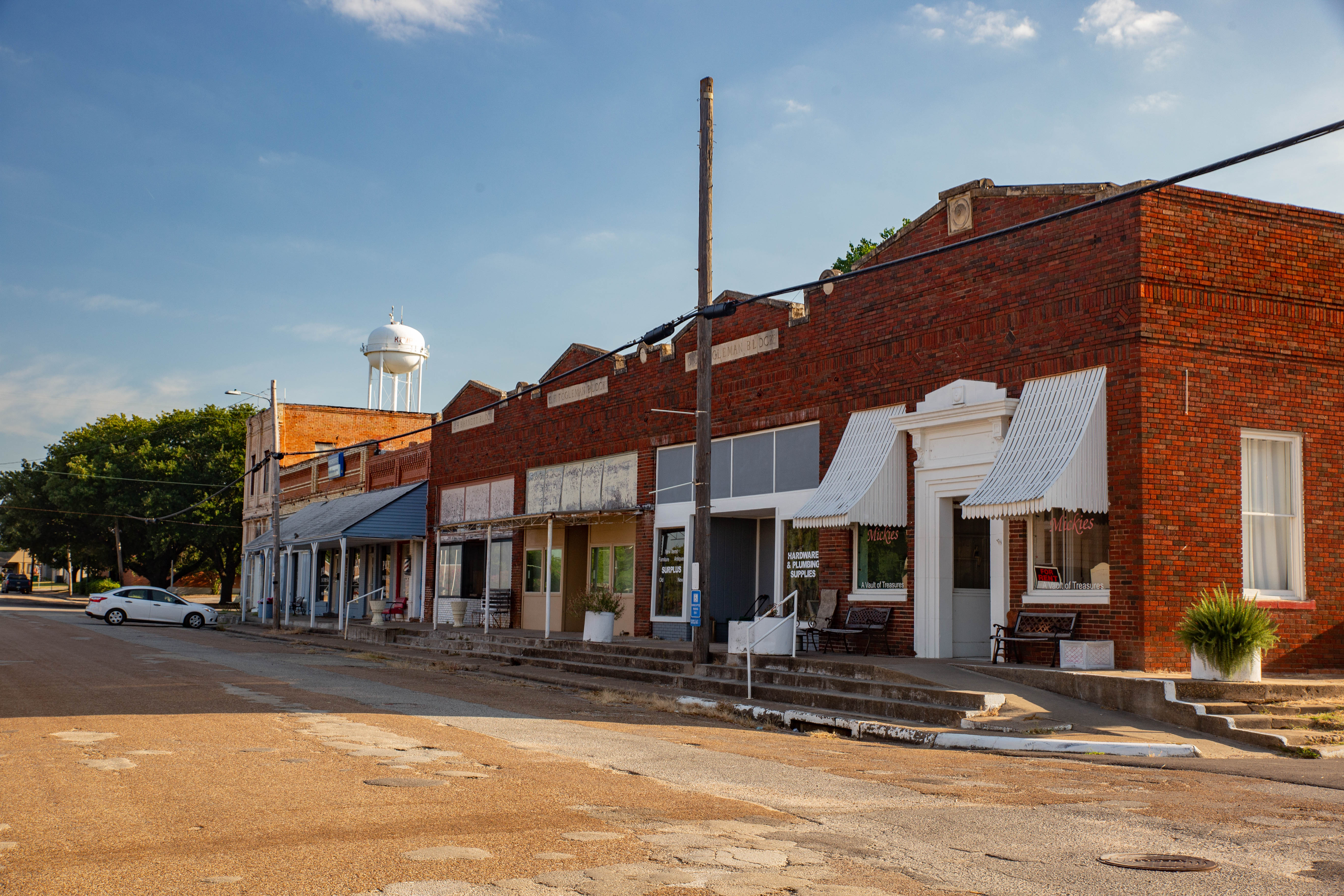
- Downtown Kemp, Texas
- Motto: Easy Livin'
- Location of Kemp in Kaufman County, Texas
- Coordinates: 32°27′14″N 96°13′33″W
- Country: United States
- State: Texas
- County: Kaufman
- Incorporated: May 18, 1922

Government
  - Type: Type A General Law Municipality

Area
  - Total: 2.20 sq mi (5.69 km^{2})
  - Land: 2.13 sq mi (5.52 km^{2})
  - Water: 0.066 sq mi (0.17 km^{2})
- Elevation: 381 ft (116 m)

Population (2020)
  - Total: 1,129
  - Density: 530/sq mi (205/km^{2})
- Time zone: UTC-6 (Central (CST))
  - Summer (DST): UTC-5 (CDT)
- ZIP code: 75143
- Area codes: 430, 903
- FIPS code: 48-38788
- GNIS feature ID: 2412823
- Website: www.cityofkemp.org

Kemp is a city in Kaufman County, Texas, United States. Its population was 1,129 in 2020.

== History ==
The community was named for Sara Kemp, mother of Levi Noble, the first postmaster, and was officially established when the post office opened in 1851. The original townsite was located on present-day County Road 4023, 2 miles (3 km) south of present-day Texas State Highway 274. It grew slowly during its first 30 years. A Presbyterian congregation was organized in 1854, and the Kemp Academy of Learning began operation in 1867. After the Civil War, an increasing number of settlers moved to the community. In 1870, Dr. A. J. Still, hoping to profit from this growth and the possible construction of a railroad through the area, bought land just north of the community (where the current city sits) and after surveying, dividing the tract into lots, and platting it, persuaded the directors of the Southern Pacific Railroad to lay tracks across his property by offering the company a number of lots. Another early settler, Sam Parmalee, followed suit and offered the rail company right-of-way through his property. The mid-1880s witnessed the completion of the rail line through the community, the construction of a depot there, and the designation of Kemp as a terminus on the line.

The railroad attracted settlers to Kemp. Prospering with the surrounding cattle ranches and cotton farms, the community developed as a trade center for the lower part of the county. By the early 20th century, the population had reached 513, and the Methodist and Baptist congregations had established churches. Kemp also supported a local newspaper, the Kemp News. The paper was owned and edited by Mike S. Boggess. In 1926, the town had 1,200 people, 60 businesses, and two banks. By 1936, 46 businesses operated in Kemp. The population declined from 1,000 to 816 between the end of World War II and the mid-1960s. Businesses declined from 41 to 33. In 1965, Cedar Creek Reservoir was completed just south of the community. Kemp had a population of 1,184 and 75 businesses in 1990. Much of the land around town was still devoted to cattle production, and many residents commuted to jobs in the Dallas area. In 2000, its population was 1,133.

During the summer of 2011, the city received national attention due to its aging water utility system and complications resulting from the severe Texas drought of 2011.

== Geography ==
Kemp is located in southeastern Kaufman County. U.S. Route 175 runs along the northeast side of the city, leading northwest 11 miles (18 km) to Kaufman, the county seat, and southeast 28 miles (45 km) to Athens.

According to the United States Census Bureau, Kemp has a total area of 2.6 square miles (6.8 km^{2}), of which 2.5 square miles (6.5 km^{2}) are land and 0.1 sq mi (0.3 km^{2}), or 4.18%, is covered by water. It is at the northern end of Cedar Creek Lake.

== Demographics ==
Historical population
Census	Pop.	Note	%±
1890	335		—
1930	990		—
1940	1,000		1.0%
1950	881		−11.9%
1960	816		−7.4%
1970	999		22.4%
1980	1,035		3.6%
1990	1,184		14.4%
2000	1,133		−4.3%
2010	1,154		1.9%
2020	1,129		−2.2%
U.S. Decennial Census

=== 2020 census ===
As of the 2020 census, Kemp had a population of 1,129 people in 385 households, including 232 families.

The median age was 38.4 years. 25.5% of residents were under the age of 18 and 20.6% of residents were 65 years of age or older. For every 100 females there were 80.6 males, and for every 100 females age 18 and over there were 72.7 males age 18 and over.

0.0% of residents lived in urban areas, while 100.0% lived in rural areas.

Of these households, 41.0% had children under the age of 18 living in them. Of all households, 45.7% were married-couple households, 15.1% were households with a male householder and no spouse or partner present, and 32.2% were households with a female householder and no spouse or partner present. About 28.5% of all households were made up of individuals and 14.8% had someone living alone who was 65 years of age or older.

There were 522 housing units, of which 26.2% were vacant. The homeowner vacancy rate was 23.9% and the rental vacancy rate was 11.9%.

Racial composition as of the 2020 census
Race	Number	Percent
White	869	77.0%
Black or African American	58	5.1%
American Indian and Alaska Native	11	1.0%
Asian	1	0.1%
Native Hawaiian and Other Pacific Islander	0	0.0%
Some other race	73	6.5%
Two or more races	117	10.4%
Hispanic or Latino (of any race)	164	14.5%

== Government ==
The city of Kemp is a Type A general-law municipality with a mayor-council form of government. The mayor is the chief executive officer of the city and oversees the day-to-day operations of the city government. The mayor is elected at-large and serves a two-year term. The city council consists of five members and the mayor. Council members are elected at-large by place, and serve for two-year terms. The mayor is the presiding officer of the city council. One council member is elected annually by the other members to serve as mayor pro tem in the absence of the mayor.

The city operates a public works department including water and wastewater utilities, and the Kemp Municipal Court. The city employs a city secretary, a small administrative staff, a municipal judge/court clerk, a public works director, a small public works staff, a chief of police, a police sergeant/K9 unit, and several full-time and reserve officers. On May 9, 2012, the city council voted to disband the Kemp Police Department in favor of outsourcing to the Kaufman County Sheriff due to budget constraints. It was subsequently restored. The chief is being sued for civil rights violations. The lawsuit is on hold, while minor criminal charges against the plaintiff remain pending.

The city has chartered the Kemp Housing Authority, which operates two public housing apartment campuses, and is governed by a board of commissioners appointed by the mayor. It employs an executive director, a clerical assistant and a small maintenance staff.

The city has chartered the Kemp Economic Development Corporation, a type 4B EDC. It is funded by a $.005 sales tax for economic development purposes. The Kemp EDC has a board of directors appointed by the Kemp City Council.

The city is served by the Kemp Municipal Development District, which includes the city of Kemp and its extraterritorial jurisdiction. The Kemp MDD was created by election in May 2010 and began operations October 1, 2010. The district levies a $.0025 sales tax for economic and municipal development purposes. The Kemp City Council serves as the Kemp Municipal Development District board of directors.

== Education ==
The city is served by the Kemp Independent School District and the Trinity Valley Community College District.

== Bibliography ==
- Robert Richard Butler, History of Kaufman County, Texas (M.A. thesis, University of Texas, 1940).
- Kaufman County Historical Commission, History of Kaufman County (Dallas: Taylor, 1978).
