= Tolosa, Texas =

- Unincorporated community
- Location within Texas Location within the United States
- Coordinates: 32°22′15″N 96°14′26″W
- Country: United States
- State: Texas
- County: Kaufman
- Elevation: 367 ft (112 m)
- Time zone: UTC-6 (Central (CST))
  - Summer (DST): UTC-5 (CDT)
- GNIS feature ID: 1379170

Tolosa is an unincorporated community in Kaufman County, located in the U.S. state of Texas. According to the Handbook of Texas, the community had a population of 58 from 1988 through 2000. It is located within the Dallas-Fort Worth metropolitan area.

== History ==
The area in what is now known as Tolosa today was settled sometime before the Civil War. Some of its first settlers were two families surnamed King and Baker, and the community was once known as Baker's Prairie. It was reported to be named from a Native American tribal group. A post office was established at Tolosa in 1880. Its population was 25 in 1884 and doubled six years later. Tolosa had ten businesses and three churches in operation. The community's population was 116 in 1904 but then plunged to 50 by 1936. Its population remained stable after World War II, in which it increased to 58 from 1988 through 2000.

Although it is unincorporated, Tolosa has a post office with the ZIP code of 75143.

== Geography ==
Tolosa is located along Texas State Highway 274, one mile west of Cedar Creek Reservoir, 49 mi (79 km) southeast of Dallas, and 14 mi (23 km) south of Kaufman in the southeastern portion of Kaufman County.

== Education ==
Tolosa had its own school in 1890. Today the community is served by the Kemp Independent School District.
