= Henry Qualls =

American blues guitarist and singer

- Also known as: Henry Lee Qualls
- Born: John Henry Miles; July 8, 1934; Elmo, Texas, United States
- Died: December 7, 2003 (aged 69) Dallas, Texas, United States
- Genres: Texas blues, country blues
- Occupations: Musician, singer, songwriter
- Instruments: Guitar, vocals
- Years active: 1950s–2003
- Label: Dallas Blues Society

Henry Qualls (July 8, 1934 – December 7, 2003) was an American Texas and country blues guitarist and singer. He found success late in his life after being "discovered" in 1993 by the Dallas Blues Society. He released his only album in 1994 but toured globally playing at a number of festivals.

The Dallas Observer noted that "Qualls, whether unearthing obscurities from Jimmy Reed or Lowell Fulson or Blind Willie Johnson or bearing down upon his own material, is a purist's dream-come-true, attacking his 36 year-old guitar with a demon-fire ferociousness first heard in the playing of Son House and other blues masters long gone to hell."

== Life and career ==
According to the researchers Bob Eagle and Eric LeBlanc, Qualls was born John Henry Miles in Elmo, Texas, a small settlement forty miles east of Dallas. He became known as Henry Lee Qualls as a child, after his mother married Scottie Moore Qualls. He grew up in Cedar Grove, Texas, and later attended Wills Point High School. He learned the rudiments of the guitar, which he named Mabelene (variously Mabelline or Maybelline), from his grandmother. Qualls originally played gospel music at his local church. In his youth, he was further instructed in guitar playing by Emmitt Williams, and he traveled to Dallas to watch Lightnin' Hopkins, Melvin "Lil' Son" Jackson, and Frankie Lee Sims in concert.

In 1955 he married Ethel Mae Cooper, and together they had eleven children. Qualls's own music career was mainly part-time, as he worked during the day ploughing fields around his lifelong home in Elmo, or else mowing lawns in Dallas. Guitar Player magazine noted that Qualls's style often involved playing his guitar flat on his lap and using a Tabasco sauce bottle as a slide. He also had a faltering style and erratic slide technique that AllMusic stated was "reminiscent of Willie "Smokey" Hogg, an artist who built a reputation on his incapacity to observe the formalities of 12-bar blues." It was this slowly dying East Texas country blues sound that captured the attention of a senior from the Dallas Blues Society, when he first heard Qualls play outside his home. Qualls became a somewhat reluctant local star and was amazed at the attention that was subsequently bestowed upon him.

Although almost 60 years old at the time, he was persuaded to record an album, Blues from Elmo, Texas, which was released in 1994. The collection included cover versions of songs written and originally performed by Hopkins and Jackson, plus Arthur "Big Boy" Crudup's "Death Valley Blues". In addition it had Qualls's versions of such diverse songs as "Motherless Children", "I Shall Not Be Moved", the Newbeats' "Bread and Butter", and Lowell Fulson's "Reconsider Baby". His work also appeared on the compilation albums Blues Across America – The Dallas Scene and Texas Blues Guitar Summit. As a result of this exposure, Qualls performed at the Utrecht Blues Festival, where Juke Blues noted he was a surprise hit. This led to engagements across Europe and the United States, including performances at the Long Beach Blues Festival (1996), the Chicago Blues Festival, and the King Biscuit Blues Festival. Despite this newfound success, Qualls continued to live in a house next to the Texas and Pacific Railway line in Elmo. He occasionally performed in Deep Ellum and Fort Worth, but generally he hated the urban environment. His rapid rise to fame is chronicled in the book In Search of the Blues: A Journey to the Soul of Black Texas.

On December 7, 2003, Qualls died in a hospital in Dallas of complications from intestinal surgery, at the age of 69. He was buried in Fairview Cemetery in Elmo.

== Discography ==
Year	Title	Record label
1994	Blues from Elmo, Texas	Dallas Blues Society

== See also ==
- List of country blues musicians
- List of Texas blues musicians
