= Ables Springs, Texas =

- Unincorporated community
- Location within Texas Location within the United States
- Coordinates: 32°48′53″N 96°07′16″W
- Country: United States
- State: Texas
- County: Kaufman
- Elevation: 518 ft (158 m)
- Time zone: UTC-6 (Central (CST))
  - Summer (DST): UTC-5 (CDT)
- GNIS feature ID: 2034613

Ables Springs is an unincorporated community in Kaufman County, Texas, United States.

== Geography ==
Ables Springs is located in northeastern Kaufman County. It is situated along FM 429, approximately ten miles northeast of Terrell.

The community, as well as all of Kaufman County, is part of the Dallas–Fort Worth–Arlington Metropolitan Statistical Area.

== History ==
Land in the area was granted to Ezekiel Ables by the state of Texas in 1848. Five years later, Ezekiel's son James and his wife Eliza settled there. A freshwater spring that later contributed to the community's name, ran through the area. Mr. and Mrs. Ables deeded an 8.75-acre (35,400 m^{2}) plot to a Methodist Episcopal Church in 1878. A tabernacle, church, and school were later constructed on the land. A separate portion was also set aside for a cemetery. Camping facilities were also available in the community. Baptist and Church of Christ congregations met where the Methodist church once stood.

For many years thereafter, Ables Springs was a center for local religious and school activities. The community remained small as surrounding towns, particularly Terrell, grew.

The spring that once served as the community's primary water source eventually ran dry as a result of overuse and development of a nearby rock quarry. The lack of water caused area officials to seek out other sources to serve Ables Springs. On November 1, 1979, the Ables Springs Water Supply Corporation was commissioned. It continues to serve the area's water needs to this date.

== Incorporation attempt ==
In early 2007, a group of Ables Springs residents began researching what it would take to incorporate the community. Citing Kaufman County's rapid population growth and the desire to preserve the small, close-knit atmosphere of Ables Springs, organizers gathered the necessary number of signatures needed to place the issue on a ballot.

The election was held on May 12, 2007. Of the 102 valid votes cast, 40 (39.22%) voted in favor of incorporation while 62 (60.78%) voted against the proposition.

== Education ==
Ables Springs is part of the Terrell Independent School District.
