= Elmo, Texas =

- Census-designated place
- Location within Texas Location within the United States
- Coordinates: 32°43′29″N 96°09′12″W
- Country: United States
- State: Texas
- County: Kaufman

Area
  - Total: 4.48 sq mi (11.60 km^{2})
  - Land: 4.11 sq mi (10.65 km^{2})
  - Water: 0.37 sq mi (0.95 km^{2})
- Elevation: 522 ft (159 m)

Population (2020)
  - Total: 803
- Time zone: UTC-6 (Central (CST))
  - Summer (DST): UTC-5 (CDT)
- ZIP code: 75118
- Area codes: 214, 469, 945, 972
- FIPS code: 48-23356
- GNIS feature ID: 2586926

Elmo is a census-designated place and unincorporated community in Kaufman County, Texas, United States. It is located on U.S. Highway 80, 6 miles (10 km) east of Terrell and 13 miles (21 km) northeast of Kaufman, the county seat. As of the 2020 census, Elmo had a population of 803.

== History ==
Elmo's history began in 1870 when the Texas and Pacific Railway laid track through the area. A community subsequently emerged at the railhead, and it was decided that the new town be named in honor of Elmo Scott, a T&P Railroad surveyor. Elmo received a post office in 1873, and by the mid-1880s, it possessed several mills, five churches, schools, and approximately 900 residents. Throughout the remainder of the 19th century, however, the population declined, and by 1945 only 150 people resided in Elmo. By 1990, this figure had fallen to 90 and remained at this level through to the 2000 Census.

In 1892, Elmo residents adopted a resolution declaring it a sundown town, prohibiting African Americans from living there and forcing existing black residents to leave.

== Demographics ==
Historical population
Census	Pop.	Note	%±
2010	768		—
2020	803		4.6%
U.S. Decennial Census; 1850–1900 1910; 1920 1930 1940; 1950 1960 1970; 1980 1990 2000; 2010 2020

Elmo first appeared as a census designated place in the 2010 U.S. census.

Elmo CDP, Texas – Racial and ethnic composition Note: the US Census treats Hispanic/Latino as an ethnic category. This table excludes Latinos from the racial categories and assigns them to a separate category. Hispanics/Latinos may be of any race.
Race / Ethnicity (NH = Non-Hispanic)	Pop 2010	Pop 2020	% 2010	% 2020
White alone (NH)	644	537	83.85%	66.87%
Black or African American alone (NH)	23	24	2.99%	2.99%
Native American or Alaska Native alone (NH)	4	6	0.52%	0.75%
Asian alone (NH)	1	0	0.13%	0.00%
Native Hawaiian or Pacific Islander alone (NH)	0	0	0.00%	0.00%
Other race alone (NH)	0	1	0.00%	0.12%
Mixed race or Multiracial (NH)	16	38	2.08%	4.73%
Hispanic or Latino (any race)	80	197	10.42%	24.53%
Total	768	803	100.00%	100.00%

== Education ==
It is within the Wills Point Independent School District.

== Notable person ==
- Henry Qualls (July 8, 1934 – December 7, 2003) — American texas blues and country blues guitarist and singer

== See also ==
- List of sundown towns in the United States
