= Combine, Texas =

- City
- Location of Combine in Kaufman County, Texas
- Coordinates: 32°34′40″N 96°30′56″W
- Country: United States
- State: Texas
- Counties: Kaufman, Dallas

Area
  - Total: 7.58 sq mi (19.64 km^{2})
  - Land: 7.28 sq mi (18.85 km^{2})
  - Water: 0.30 sq mi (0.78 km^{2})
- Elevation: 358 ft (109 m)

Population (2020)
  - Total: 2,245
  - Density: 308.5/sq mi (119.1/km^{2})
- Time zone: UTC-6 (Central (CST))
  - Summer (DST): UTC-5 (CDT)
- ZIP code: 75159
- Area codes: 214, 469, 945, 972
- FIPS code: 48-16216
- GNIS feature ID: 2410208
- Website: http://combinetx.com

Combine is a city in Dallas and Kaufman counties in the U.S. state of Texas. The population was 2,245 in 2020.

== Geography ==
According to the United States Census Bureau, the city has a total area of 7.0 square miles (18.1 km^{2}), of which 6.7 square miles (17.3 km^{2}) is land and 0.31 square miles (0.8 km^{2}), or 4.16%, is water.

== Demographics ==
Historical population
Census	Pop.	Note	%±
1970	249		—
1980	688		176.3%
1990	1,329		93.2%
2000	1,788		34.5%
2010	1,942		8.6%
2020	2,245		15.6%
2023 (est.)	2,595		15.6%
U.S. Decennial Census

=== 2020 census ===
As of the 2020 census, Combine had a population of 2,245 people living in 744 households, including 608 families, in the city. The median age was 42.9 years; 22.4% of residents were under age 18 and 17.3% were age 65 or older.

For every 100 females there were 106.7 males, and for every 100 females age 18 and over there were 106.6 males age 18 and over.

0% of residents lived in urban areas, while 100.0% lived in rural areas.

There were 744 households in Combine, of which 36.4% had children under the age of 18 living in them. Of all households, 63.6% were married-couple households, 14.8% were households with a male householder and no spouse or partner present, and 14.2% were households with a female householder and no spouse or partner present. About 13.1% of all households were made up of individuals and 6.0% had someone living alone who was 65 years of age or older.

There were 794 housing units, of which 6.3% were vacant. Among occupied housing units, 90.5% were owner-occupied and 9.5% were renter-occupied. The homeowner vacancy rate was 1.4% and the rental vacancy rate was 12.8%.

Racial composition as of the 2020 census
Race	Number	Percent
White	1,644	73.2%
Black or African American	21	0.9%
American Indian and Alaska Native	44	2.0%
Asian	13	0.6%
Native Hawaiian and Other Pacific Islander	0	0%
Some other race	283	12.6%
Two or more races	240	10.7%
Hispanic or Latino (of any race)	599	26.7%

== Education ==
Combine is served by two school districts: portions in Kaufman County are in the Crandall Independent School District, while portions in Dallas County are in the Dallas Independent School District (DISD).

The students in the Crandall portion are zoned to Wilson Elementary School, Crandall Middle School, and Crandall High School, all within the city of Crandall.

The students in the Dallas County portion are zoned to attend the following schools in the Seagoville area: Seagoville Elementary School, Seagoville Middle School, and Seagoville High School.

All of Dallas County (its portion of Combine included) is in the service area of Dallas College (formerly Dallas County Community College). All of Kaufman County (its portion of Combine included) is in the service area of Trinity Valley Community College.

The Crandall-Combine Community Library is within Central Middle School in Crandall. The library was previously in Crandall High School.
