= Gastonia, Texas =

- Unincorporated community
- Location within Texas Location within the United States
- Coordinates: 32°36′42″N 96°24′09″W
- Country: United States
- State: Texas
- County: Kaufman
- Elevation: 446 ft (136 m)
- Time zone: UTC-6 (Central (CST))
  - Summer (DST): UTC-5 (CDT)
- GNIS feature ID: 1378346

Gastonia is an unincorporated community in Kaufman County, located in the U.S. state of Texas. According to the Handbook of Texas, the community had a population of 30 in 2000. It is located within the Dallas/Fort Worth Metroplex.

== History ==
The area in what is known as Gastonia today was first settled in the late 1800s near the Southern Pacific Railroad. It was most likely named for local settler Bill Gaston. There was a church in the community and served as a shipping point for farmers in the area. Its population was never higher than 50, in which it had 30 residents from the late 1970s through 2000.

== Geography ==
Gastonia is located on U.S. Highway 175 between Kaufman and Crandall in west-central Kaufman County.

== Education ==
Gastonia once had its own school. Today, the community is served by the Crandall Independent School District, in which elementary students attend Nola Kathryn Wilson Elementary School in Crandall.
