= Cobb, Texas =

- Unincorporated community
- Location within Texas Location within the United States
- Coordinates: 32°42′51″N 96°06′01″W
- Country: United States
- State: Texas
- County: Kaufman
- Elevation: 531 ft (162 m)
- Time zone: UTC-6 (Central (CST))
  - Summer (DST): UTC-5 (CDT)
- GNIS feature ID: 1378138

Cobb is an unincorporated community in Kaufman County, located in the U.S. state of Texas. It is located within the Dallas/Fort Worth Metroplex.

== History ==
Originally, the place was known as Cobb's. The area started as a stop on the Texas and Pacific Railway in the mid-1880s. It was named for county commissioner and chief justice Carey Cobb. A post office was established at Cobb in 1897 and remained operational until 1923. There were two general stores in 1914. It had several businesses and farms shown on county maps in the 1930s. It continued to be listed as a community by name but had no population estimates.

== Geography ==
Cobb is located on U.S. Highway 80, 15 mi (24 km) northeast of Kaufman in northeastern Kaufman County.

== Education ==
Cobb had its own school in the 1930s. Today, the Wills Point Independent School District serves the community.
