= Markout, Texas =

- Unincorporated community
- Location within Texas Location within the United States
- Coordinates: 32°42′24″N 96°29′33″W
- Country: United States
- State: Texas
- County: Kaufman
- Elevation: 466 ft (142 m)
- Time zone: UTC-6 (Central (CST))
  - Summer (DST): UTC-5 (CDT)
- GNIS feature ID: 1378643

Markout is an unincorporated community in Kaufman County, located in the U.S. state of Texas. According to the Handbook of Texas, the community had a population of 80 in 2000. It is located within the Dallas/Fort Worth Metroplex.

== History ==
Markout had a Baptist church called Pleasant Grove Baptist Church, which changed its name to Markout Baptist Church until it returned to Pleasant Grove in 1980. The community had a population of 80 from the mid-1960s through 2000.

== Geography ==
Markout is located on Farm to Market Road 740, 14 mi (23 km) northwest of Kaufman in northwestern Kaufman County.

== Education ==
Markout had a school called East Fork Academy in 1884. The school consolidated with the Forney Independent School District in 1947. The local Baptist church continued holding services there. The community continues to be served by Forney ISD today, with elementary students attending Johnson Elementary School in Forney.
