= Gastonia =

Gastonia may refer to:

- Gastonia (plant), a genus in the ivy or ginseng family
- Gastonia (dinosaur), a genus of ankylosaur
- Gastonia, North Carolina, United States
  - Gastonia station, an Amtrak train station
- Gastonia, Texas, an unincorporated community
- Gastonia novels, several novels concerned with the events of the 1929 Loray Mill strike
