= McCoy, Texas =

McCoy, Texas may refer to the following unincorporated communities:

- McCoy, Atascosa County, Texas
- McCoy, Kaufman County, Texas
