= Brice McCain =

American football player (born 1986)

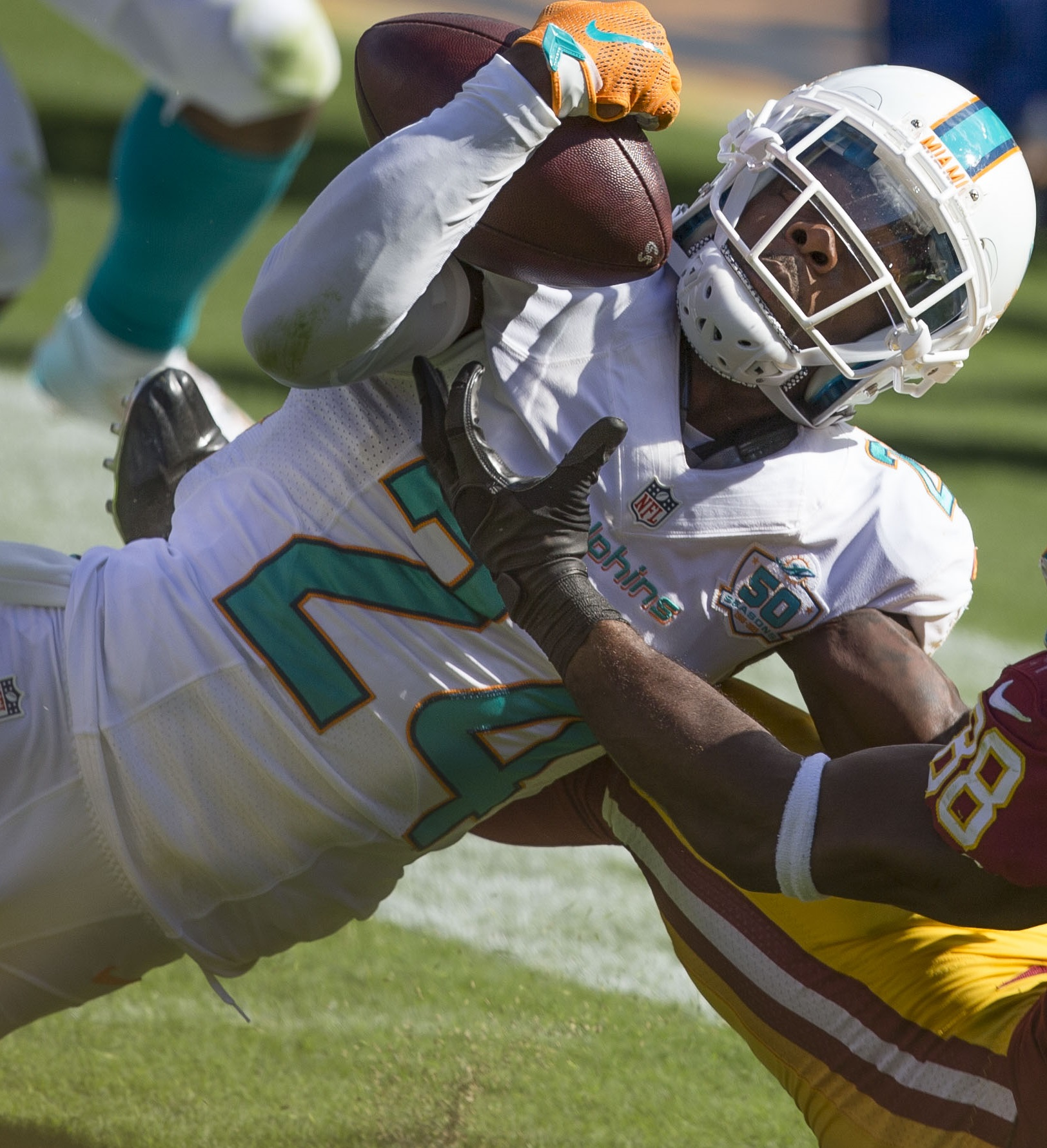
- McCain with the Miami Dolphins in 2015

No. 41, 21, 25, 24, 23
- Position: Cornerback

Personal information
- Born: December 10, 1986 (age 39); Dallas, Texas, U.S.
- Listed height: 5 ft 9 in (1.75 m)
- Listed weight: 190 lb (86 kg)

Career information
- High school: Terrell (Terrell, Texas)
- College: Utah
- NFL draft: 2009: 6th round, 188th overall pick

Career history
- Houston Texans (2009–2013); Pittsburgh Steelers (2014); Miami Dolphins (2015); Tennessee Titans (2016–2017)

Awards and highlights
- First-team All-MW (2008); Second-team All-MW (2007)

Career NFL statistics
- Total tackles: 238
- Sacks: 0.5
- Fumble recoveries: 1
- Pass deflections: 62
- Interceptions: 11
- Defensive touchdowns: 2
- Stats at Pro Football Reference

Brice Antwion McCain (born December 10, 1986) is an American former professional football player who was a cornerback in the National Football League (NFL) for nine seasons. He played college football for the Utah Utes and was selected by the Houston Texans in the sixth round of the 2009 NFL draft. McCain also played for the Pittsburgh Steelers, Miami Dolphins, and Tennessee Titans.

== Early life ==
McCain attended Terrell High School in Terrell, Texas, where he was all-district as a running back and defensive back. McCain played cornerback, wide receiver, and running back while also returning punts and kickoffs. He also lettered in basketball and track, running 100 meters in 10.3 seconds, and was a member of the 400m relay team that placed second in the state (40.6 seconds).

McCain was considered a two-star recruit by Rivals.com.

== College career ==
McCain attended the University of Utah from 2005 to 2008. He finished his collegiate career with 103 tackles, 21 pass deflections, and three interceptions. McCain was a two-time all-MWC selection.

== Professional career ==
Pre-draft measurables
Height	Weight	40-yard dash	10-yard split	20-yard split	20-yard shuttle	Three-cone drill	Vertical jump	Broad jump	Bench press
5 ft 8 7/8 in (1.75 m)	185 lb (84 kg)	4.33 s	1.47 s	2.51 s	3.99 s	6.74 s	36.5 in (0.93 m)	10 ft 3 in (3.12 m)	12 reps
All values from Pro Day

=== Houston Texans ===
McCain was selected by the Houston Texans in the sixth round (188th overall) of the 2009 NFL draft.

After five seasons with the Texans, McCain was released on March 11, 2014.

=== Pittsburgh Steelers ===
McCain signed a one-year contract with the Pittsburgh Steelers on April 1, 2014.

McCain recorded his first interception as a Steeler in the Week 5 matchup against the Jaguars by intercepting Blake Bortles and returned it for the second touchdown of his career. In the regular season finale against the Bengals, McCain intercepted Andy Dalton twice in the 27-17 victory.

=== Miami Dolphins ===
On March 11, 2015, McCain signed a two-year, $5.5 million contract with the Miami Dolphins with $3 million guaranteed.

McCain was released on February 12, 2016.

=== Tennessee Titans ===
On March 2, 2016, McCain signed a two-year deal with the Tennessee Titans worth $5 million, reuniting him with former Steelers defensive coordinator Dick LeBeau.

== NFL career statistics ==
Legend
**Bold**	Career high

=== Regular season ===
Year	Team	Games		Tackles					Interceptions					Fumbles			
Year	Team	GP	GS	Cmb	Solo	Ast	Sck	TFL	Int	Yds	TD	Lng	PD	FF	FR	Yds	TD
2009	HOU	**16**	1	15	14	1	0.0	0	1	0	0	0	3	0	0	0	0
2010	HOU	12	3	25	20	5	0.0	0	0	0	0	0	2	0	0	0	0
2011	HOU	**16**	0	28	27	1	0.0	0	2	48	**1**	38	**13**	0	0	0	0
2012	HOU	12	2	24	20	4	**0.5**	0	1	**86**	0	**86**	8	0	0	0	0
2013	HOU	**16**	4	32	25	7	0.0	0	1	0	0	0	7	0	0	0	0
2014	PIT	14	9	25	16	**9**	0.0	0	**3**	56	**1**	31	6	0	**1**	**26**	0
2015	MIA	14	**11**	**39**	**31**	8	0.0	0	1	0	0	0	10	0	0	0	0
2016	TEN	**16**	10	38	**31**	7	0.0	**1**	2	33	0	33	10	0	0	0	0
2017	TEN	**16**	1	12	9	3	0.0	0	0	0	0	0	3	0	0	0	0
Career		132	41	238	193	45	0.5	1	11	223	2	86	62	0	1	26	0

=== Postseason ===
Year	Team	Games		Tackles					Interceptions					Fumbles			
Year	Team	GP	GS	Cmb	Solo	Ast	Sck	TFL	Int	Yds	TD	Lng	PD	FF	FR	Yds	TD
2011	HOU	**2**	**1**	0	0	0	0.0	0	0	0	0	0	**2**	0	0	0	0
2014	PIT	1	**1**	**6**	**5**	**1**	0.0	0	0	0	0	0	0	0	0	0	0
2017	TEN	**2**	0	0	0	0	0.0	0	0	0	0	0	0	0	0	0	0
Career		5	2	6	5	1	0.0	0	0	0	0	0	2	0	0	0	0
