= Ola, Kaufman County, Texas =

Ola, Texas
- Unincorporated community
- Location within Texas Location within the United States
- Coordinates: 32°34′31″N 96°10′32″W
- Country: United States
- State: Texas
- County: Kaufman
- Elevation: 479 ft (146 m)
- Time zone: UTC-6 (Central (CST))
  - Summer (DST): UTC-5 (CDT)
- GNIS feature ID: 1378789

Ola is an unincorporated community in Kaufman County, located in the U.S. state of Texas. According to the Handbook of Texas, the community had a population of 50 in 2000. It is located within the Dallas/Fort Worth Metroplex.

== History ==
The area in what is known as Ola today was first settled in the late 19th century. A post office was established at Ola in 1892 and remained in operation until 1911. There were several businesses in Ola in 1896. The population of the community was reported as 72 in 1900, which dropped to 30 in 1910, and returned to 72 from 1930 to the mid-1960s. There were two businesses between 1930 and 1940, only one in 1945, and none for many years after. There is currently a small convenience store at the intersection of Hwy 243 and County Road 103, across the street from the Ola Church of Christ and local cemetery. Its population was 50 from 1970 through 2000.

== Geography ==
Ola is located on Texas State Highway 243, 7 mi (11 km) east of Kaufman and 21 mi (34 km) west of Canton in east-central Kaufman County.

== Education ==
Ola is served by the Kaufman Independent School District.
