= Jiba =

Jiba may refer to:

- Jiba (Tenrikyo), the sacred spot where Tenrikyo adherents believe humankind was conceived
- Jiba language, a Jukunoid language of Nigeria
- Jiba, Texas, an unincorporated community in Kaufman County, Texas
- Maka Jiba, the ruler of Bundu in West Africa between around 1720 and 1764
