= Texas State Highway Spur 557 =

Highway in Texas

State Highway Spur 557
- Spur 557 highlighted in red

Route information
- Maintained by TxDOT
- Length: 4.369 mi (7.031 km)
- Existed: 1987–present

Major junctions
- West end: US 80 in Northspur
- East end: I-20 near Terrell

Location
- Country: United States
- State: Texas

Highway system
- Highways in Texas; Interstate; US; State; Former; Toll; Loops; Spurs; FM/RM; Park; Rec
← Loop 556	→ Loop 561

Spur 557 is a 4.369-mile-long (7.031 km) spur route in the city of Terrell in the U.S. state of Texas. Spur 557 is a freeway connector between I-20 and US 80. It is signed as "Spur 557 To I-20" eastbound or "Spur 557 To US 80" westbound. Spur 557 is the original routing of I-20 prior to I-20 being rerouted to the south.

The route traverses a largely undeveloped area in Kaufman County, Texas between Forney, Texas and Terrell, Texas and serves to distribute eastbound traffic onto Interstate 20 and westbound traffic onto the US 80 freeway leading into the Dallas-Fort Worth Metroplex.

== History ==
Spur 557 was designated on August 18, 1987 on an old alignment of I-20 when it was rerouted southeast of Dallas. I-20 was originally designated over the route in 1959.

== Route description ==
Spur 557 is a short freeway connector between I-20 and US 80 west of Terrell. It begins at the eastern end of the freeway segment of US 80 and heads towards the southeast. US 80 continues to the east as a surface road to Terrell. Spur 557 has two interchanges between its two termini: one at the Las Lomas Parkway and another at FM 148. The spur merges with eastbound traffic at its eastern terminus at I-20.

== Exit list ==
The entire route is in Kaufman County.

Location	mi	km	Destinations	Notes
	0.0	0.0	US 80 west – Dallas	Westbound exit and eastbound entrance, western terminus
Terrell	0.9	1.4	Frontage Road	Westbound exit and eastbound entrance
Terrell	1.7	2.7	Las Lomas Parkway	
Terrell	2.1	3.4	Frontage Road	Eastbound exit and entrance
Terrell	3.0	4.8	FM 148 – Terrell	
Terrell	4.369	7.031	I-20 / Rose Hill Road – Shreveport	Eastbound exit and westbound entrance, eastern terminus, I-20 exit 499A
1.000 mi = 1.609 km; 1.000 km = 0.621 mi: Incomplete access
