= Travis Ranch, Texas =

- Census-designated place
- Location within Texas Location within the United States
- Coordinates: 32°48′05″N 96°28′39″W
- Country: United States
- State: Texas
- County: Kaufman

Area
  - Total: 0.794 sq mi (2.06 km^{2})
  - Land: 0.793 sq mi (2.05 km^{2})
  - Water: 0.001 sq mi (0.0026 km^{2})
- Elevation: 463 ft (141 m)

Population (2010)
  - Total: 2,556
  - Density: 3,220/sq mi (1,240/km^{2})
- Time zone: UTC-6 (Central)
  - Summer (DST): UTC-5 (Central)
- ZIP code: 75126
- Area codes: 214, 469, 945, 972
- GNIS feature ID: 2584748
- FIPS code: 48-73562

Travis Ranch is a census-designated place (CDP) in Kaufman County, Texas, United States. As of the 2020 census, Travis Ranch had a population of 7,324. It is part of the Dallas–Fort Worth–Arlington metropolitan area.

The community is in the northwestern corner of Kaufman County, approximately 10 miles (16 km) northeast of Mesquite and 15 miles (24 km) northwest of Terrell. It is bordered to the north by the city of Heath. The northwestern corner of the town abuts Lake Ray Hubbard on the East Fork Trinity River. According to the U.S. Census Bureau, the CDP has an area of 520 acres (2.1 km^{2}), of which 0.7 acres (0.3 ha), or 0.13%, is covered by water. Travis ranch was established in the early 2000s (1999-2007).

== Demographics ==
Historical population
Census	Pop.	Note	%±
2010	2,556		—
2020	7,324		186.5%
U.S. Decennial Census; 1850–1900 1910; 1920 1930 1940; 1950 1960 1970; 1980 1990 2000; 2010 2020

Travis Ranch first appeared as a census designated place in the 2010 U.S. census.

Travis Ranch CDP, Texas – Racial and ethnic composition Note: the US Census treats Hispanic/Latino as an ethnic category. This table excludes Latinos from the racial categories and assigns them to a separate category. Hispanics/Latinos may be of any race.
Race / Ethnicity (NH = Non-Hispanic)	Pop 2010	Pop 2020	% 2010	% 2020
White alone (NH)	1,643	3,025	64.28%	41.30%
Black or African American alone (NH)	351	1,935	13.73%	26.42%
Native American or Alaska Native alone (NH)	6	26	0.23%	0.35%
Asian alone (NH)	100	369	3.91%	5.04%
Native Hawaiian or Pacific Islander alone (NH)	1	20	0.04%	0.27%
Other race alone (NH)	0	11	0.00%	0.15%
Mixed race or Multiracial (NH)	40	314	1.56%	4.29%
Hispanic or Latino (any race)	415	1,624	16.24%	22.17%
Total	2,556	7,324	100.00%	100.00%
