= Tramain (name) =

Tramain is a given name. Notable people with the name include:

- Tramain Jacobs (born 1992), American football player
- Tramain Jones (born 1975), American football player

== See also ==
- Tremain
