= Colquitt =

Colquitt may refer to:

== Places ==
- Colquitt, Georgia, city in Miller County, Georgia, U.S.A.
- Colquitt, Texas, an unincorporated community
- Colquitt County, Georgia

== People with the surname ==
- Alfred Colquitt, son of Walter T. Colquitt, Confederate General, Governor of Georgia, and U.S. Senator from Georgia (1824-1894)
- Betsy Colquitt (born 1927), American modernist poet
- Britton Colquitt, punter for the Minnesota Vikings of the NFL
- Craig Colquitt, former American football punter for the Pittsburgh Steelers of the NFL, father of Dustin and Britton Colquitt, and brother of Jimmy Colquitt
- Dustin Colquitt, punter for the Kansas City Chiefs of the NFL
- Jerry Colquitt (born 1972), American football player
- Jimmy Colquitt, former punter for the Seattle Seahawks of the NFL
- Oscar Branch Colquitt, Governor of Texas 1911-1915
- Peyton H. Colquitt, Confederate officer killed at the Battle of Chickamauga
- Walter Terry Colquitt, lawyer, Methodist preacher, U.S. Representative and Senator from Georgia (1799-1855)
