= Lawrence, Texas =

- Unincorporated community
- Location within Texas Location within the United States
- Coordinates: 32°44′32″N 96°20′34″W
- Country: United States
- State: Texas
- County: Kaufman
- Elevation: 482 ft (147 m)
- Time zone: UTC-6 (Central (CST))
  - Summer (DST): UTC-5 (CDT)
- GNIS feature ID: 1374490

Lawrence is an unincorporated community in Kaufman County, located in the U.S. state of Texas. According to the Handbook of Texas, the community had a population of 279 in 2000. It is located within the Dallas/Fort Worth Metroplex.

== History ==
The area in what is known as Lawrence today was first settled in the early 1840s. The Texas and Pacific Railway built a track through the community in 1872. A post office was established at Lawrence in 1874 and remained in operation until the 1930s. Lawrence had three stores, a church, a hotel, and 200 residents in the early 1880s. Farmers brought crops here to use the corn and gristmills and used grain cars provided by the railroad. Its population was 176 in 1904, dropping to 75 from 1925 to the 1930s. The population further declined to 40 after World War II. It then made a comeback in the 1970s. The population surpassed the 100 mark in 1974, with an official population of 113 in 1988. Two years later, it grew to 231 and stopped at 279 in 2000.

== Geography ==
Lawrence is located on a railroad spur off Farm to Market Road 1392, 5 mi (8.0 km) northwest of Terrell in northwestern Kaufman County.

=== Climate ===
The climate in this area is characterized by hot, humid summers and generally mild to cool winters. According to the Köppen Climate Classification system, Lawrence has a humid subtropical climate, abbreviated "Cfa" on climate maps.

== Education ==
Lawrence had its own school in the 1880s. Today, Lawrence is served by the Kaufman Independent School District.
