= Hiram, Texas =

- Unincorporated community
- Location within Texas Location within the United States
- Coordinates: 32°38′36″N 96°06′30″W
- Country: United States
- State: Texas
- County: Kaufman
- Elevation: 443 ft (135 m)
- Time zone: UTC-6 (Central (CST))
  - Summer (DST): UTC-5 (CDT)
- GNIS feature ID: 1378456

Hiram is an unincorporated community in Kaufman County, located in the U.S. state of Texas. According to the Handbook of Texas, the community had a population of 34 in 2000. It is located within the Dallas/Fort Worth Metroplex.

== History ==
Hiram was once known as Locust Grove. A post office was established at Hiram in 1893 and remained in operation until 1906, with James Hiram Hughes as postmaster. The community had mercantile stores, a cotton gin, three churches, a doctor's office, and a sawmill. The population of Hiram was 110 from 1904 to 30 in the late 1940s to 1990. It then had a Baptist church, a cemetery, and a nursing home all named Locust Grove in 1985. The population went up to 34 in 2000.

== Geography ==
Hiram is located on Farm to Market Road 2965, south of Texas State Highway 20 on the eastern edge of Kaufman County.

== Education ==
Hiram is served by the Wills Point Independent School District.
