= List of Education Service Centers in Texas =

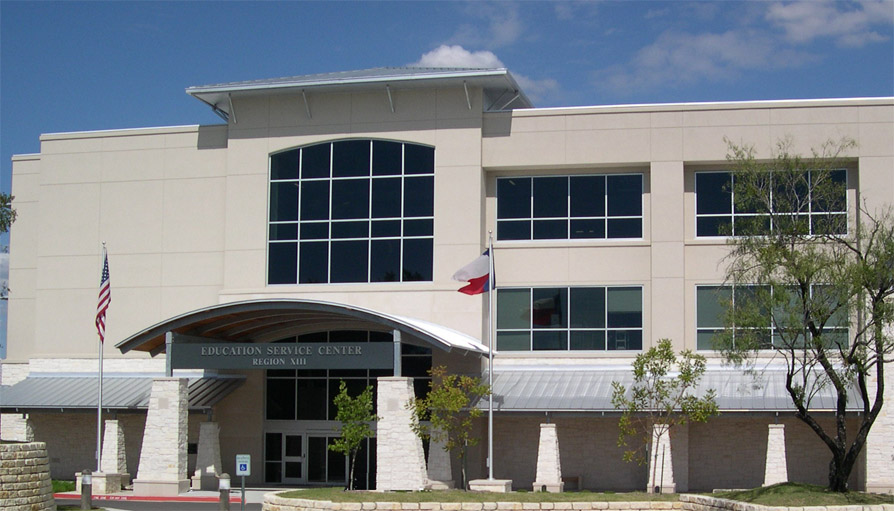
Education Service Center Region 13 in Austin

In order to serve the numerous individual school districts and charter schools in Texas, Texas Education Agency (TEA) is divided into 20 regions, each containing an Educational Service Center, or ESC. These are also sometimes called Regional Service Centers, or RSC. The ESC's serve as a liaison between the districts and TEA headquarters, providing support to the districts such as conducting workshops and technical assistance. The ESC's do not have any regulatory authority to monitor the districts (this is reserved for TEA headquarters).

== Centers ==
Below are the districts, the cities in which the ESC office is located, and the counties served (districts which overlap counties are served by the ESC for the county in which the district's administrative office is located):

- Region 1, Edinburg – Brooks, Cameron, Hidalgo, Jim Hogg, Starr, Webb, Willacy, and Zapata
- Region 2, Corpus Christi – Aransas, Bee, Duval, Jim Wells, Kenedy, Kleberg, Live Oak, McMullen, Nueces, and San Patricio
- Region 3, Victoria – Calhoun, Colorado, DeWitt, Goliad, Jackson, Karnes, Lavaca, Matagorda, Refugio, Victoria, and Wharton
- Region 4, Houston – Brazoria, Chambers, Fort Bend, Galveston (excluding High Island, which is served by Region 5), Harris, Liberty, and Waller
- Region 5, Beaumont—Galveston (High Island district only; all others are served by Region 4), Hardin, Jasper, Jefferson, Newton, Orange, and Tyler
- Region 6, Huntsville – Austin, Brazos, Burleson, Grimes, Houston, Leon, Madison, Milam (excluding Thorndale ISD, which is served by Region 13), Montgomery, Polk, Robertson, San Jacinto, Trinity, Walker, and Washington
- Region 7, Kilgore – Anderson, Angelina, Cherokee, Gregg, Harrison, Henderson, Nacogdoches, Panola, Rains, Rusk, Sabine, San Augustine, Shelby, Smith, Upshur, Van Zandt (excluding Canton and Wills Point districts, which are served by Region 10), and Wood
- Region 8, Mount Pleasant – Bowie, Camp, Cass, Delta, Franklin, Hopkins, Lamar, Marion, Morris, Red River, and Titus
- Region 9, Wichita Falls – Archer, Baylor, Clay, Foard, Hardeman, Jack, Knox, Montague, Throckmorton, Wichita, Wilbarger, and Young
- Region 10, Richardson – Collin, Dallas, Ellis, Fannin, Grayson, Hunt, Kaufman, Rockwall, and Van Zandt (Canton and Wills Point districts only; all others are served by Region 7)
- Region 11, White Settlement (formerly Fort Worth) – Cooke, Denton (but not including Carrollton-Farmers Branch or Frisco ISDs, which are served by Region 10), Erath, Hood, Johnson, Parker, Palo Pinto, Somervell, Tarrant, and Wise
- Region 12, Waco – Bell, Bosque, Coryell, Falls, Freestone, Hamilton, Hill, Lampasas, Limestone, McLennan, Mills, and Navarro
- Region 13, Austin – Bastrop, Blanco, Burnet, Caldwell, Comal, Fayette, Gillespie, Gonzales, Guadalupe, Hays, Kendall (Comfort ISD only; all others are served by Region 20), Lee, Llano, Milam (Thorndale ISD only; all others are served by Region 6), Travis, and Williamson
- Region 14, Abilene – Callahan, Comanche, Eastland, Fisher, Haskell, Jones, Mitchell, Nolan, Scurry, Shackelford, Stephens, Stonewall, and Taylor
- Region 15, San Angelo – Brown, Coke, Coleman, Concho, Crockett, Edwards, Irion, Kimble, Mason, McCulloch, Menard, Runnels, San Saba, Schleicher, Sterling, Sutton, Tom Green, and Val Verde
- Region 16, Amarillo – Armstrong, Briscoe, Carson, Castro, Childress, Collingsworth, Dallam, Deaf Smith, Donley, Gray, Hall, Hansford, Hartley, Hemphill, Hutchinson, Lipscomb, Moore, Ochiltree, Oldham, Parmer, Potter, Randall, Roberts, Sherman, Swisher, and Wheeler
- Region 17, Lubbock – Bailey, Borden, Cochran, Cottle, Crosby, Dawson, Dickens, Floyd, Gaines, Garza, Hale, Hockley, Kent, King, Lamb, Lubbock, Lynn, Motley, Terry, and Yoakum.
- Region 18, Midland – Andrews, Brewster, Crane, Culberson, Ector, Glasscock, Howard, Jeff Davis, Loving, Martin, Midland, Pecos, Presidio, Reagan, Reeves, Terrell, Upton, Ward, and Winkler
- Region 19, El Paso – El Paso and Hudspeth
- Region 20, San Antonio – Atascosa, Bandera, Bexar, Dimmit, Frio, Kendall (excluding Comfort ISD, which is served by Region 13), Kerr, Kinney, La Salle, Maverick, Medina, Real, Uvalde, Wilson, and Zavala
