= Peeltown, Texas =

- Unincorporated community
- Location within Texas Location within the United States
- Coordinates: 32°24′19″N 96°22′52″W
- Country: United States
- State: Texas
- County: Kaufman
- Elevation: 381 ft (116 m)
- Time zone: UTC-6 (Central (CST))
  - Summer (DST): UTC-5 (CDT)
- GNIS feature ID: 1378848

Peeltown is an unincorporated community in Kaufman County, located in the U.S. state of Texas.

It is a small rural community of 120-150 people, located off County Roads 3094 and 4072. Peeltown is approximately 13 mi (21 km) southwest of Kaufman and 1 mi (1.6 km) east of the Trinity River in southwestern Kaufman County. Peeltown was named for landowner Monroe Peel, of the Peel family, who arrived from Mississippi and settled in the area in the 1860s.

== Infrastructure ==
In 1910, a large gin was constructed in the Peeltown community. By the 1930s, Peeltown had a church, school, the gin, and numerous homes and farms. By the second half of the 20th century, though, the school was closed. Peeltown does not have a gas station or grocery store, but has the Indian Oaks Golf Course and a tree farm.

The center of Peeltown is at the intersection of County Roads 3094 and 4072; it consists of the Memorial Baptist Church and the Peeltown Cotton Gin. A number of abandoned buildings are in central Peeltown, including the Little Peeltown Grocery Store and the Peeltown School, which ceased to operate after being destroyed by fire.

== Peeltown Cemetery ==
The Peel Family Cemetery was established in 1876, following the death of J. T. Peel. It is located 0.5 miles (0.80 km) south of the Kaufman-Henderson County line and the Old Peeltown Community. The cemetery is no longer functional and is only accessible on foot, as the cemetery path crosses a large, deep creek bed. The cemetery, which is on the south bank of the creek, is around 3/4 acre in size and is completely fenced. The inaccessibility of the cemetery may be responsible for its preservation, although it is currently overgrown in brush, weeds, and prickly pear.
