= Heartland, Texas =

Unincorporated community in Texas, US

Coordinates: 32°40′29″N 96°27′05″W

Heartland is an unincorporated community and census designated place (CDP) located in Kaufman County, Texas, United States. As of the 2020 census, Heartland had a population of 8,509. It was founded in 2006. The 2,000 acre master-planned community is located 25 miles east of Downtown Dallas and is part of the Dallas-Fort Worth Metroplex. In 2009, Heartland was awarded community of the year by The Homebuilders Association of Greater Dallas.

== Demographics ==
Historical population
Census	Pop.	Note	%±
2020	8,509		—
U.S. Decennial Census; 1850–1900 1910; 1920 1930 1940; 1950 1960 1970; 1980 1990 2000; 2010 2020

Heartland first appeared as a census designated place in the 2020 U.S. census.

=== 2020 census ===
Heartland CDP, Texas – Racial and ethnic composition Note: the US Census treats Hispanic/Latino as an ethnic category. This table excludes Latinos from the racial categories and assigns them to a separate category. Hispanics/Latinos may be of any race.
Race / Ethnicity (NH = Non-Hispanic)	Pop 2020	% 2020
White alone (NH)	2,708	31.83%
Black or African American alone (NH)	3,141	36.91%
Native American or Alaska Native alone (NH)	29	0.34%
Asian alone (NH)	109	1.28%
Native Hawaiian or Pacific Islander alone (NH)	5	0.06%
Other race alone (NH)	58	0.68%
Mixed race or Multiracial (NH)	342	4.02%
Hispanic or Latino (any race)	2,117	24.88%
Total	8,509	100.00%

== Education ==
The community is served by the Crandall Independent School District. There are currently four of five planned schools within Heartland: Barbara Walker Elementary, Hollis T. Dietz Elementary, Opal Smith Elementary, and Heartland Middle School.
