= Colquitt, Texas =

- Unincorporated community
- Location within Texas Location within the United States
- Coordinates: 32°47′43″N 96°21′27″W
- Country: United States
- State: Texas
- County: Kaufman
- Elevation: 522 ft (159 m)
- Time zone: UTC-6 (Central (CST))
  - Summer (DST): UTC-5 (CDT)
- GNIS feature ID: 1378145

Colquitt is an unincorporated community in Kaufman County, located in the U.S. state of Texas. It is located within the Dallas/Fort Worth Metroplex.

== History ==
The area in what is known as Colquitt today was first settled in the 1880s and has served as a shipping point for farmers in the area. It was named for Oscar Branch Colquitt's family, who were among the first settlers here. The community had a gin, a store, and several homes at one point. Its population was over 100 people between 1910 and the 1930s. It declined to 25 during the next decade and was listed on county maps in 1990.

== Geography ==
Colquitt is located on a railroad spur off of Farm to Market Road 548, two miles south of the Rockwall County line in north-central Kaufman County.

== Education ==
Colquitt is served by the Terrell Independent School District.
