= Cedarvale, Texas =

- Unincorporated community
- Location within Texas Location within the United States
- Coordinates: 32°34′11″N 96°05′30″W
- Country: United States
- State: Texas
- County: Kaufman
- Elevation: 410 ft (120 m)
- Time zone: UTC-6 (Central (CST))
  - Summer (DST): UTC-5 (CDT)
- GNIS feature ID: 1378105

Cedarvale is an unincorporated community in Kaufman County, located in the U.S. state of Texas.
