= Crandall Independent School District =

School district in Texas, United States

Address
- 400 W. Lewis St. Crandall, Texas, USA ESC Region 10
- Coordinates: 32°32′23″N 96°27′39″W

District information
- Type: Independent School District
- Motto: Every Pirate, Every Day
- Grades: PK-12
- Established: February 28, 1901; 125 years ago
- Superintendent: Anjanette Murry
- Governing agency: Texas Education Agency
- Schools: 10
- NCES District ID: 4815510

Students and staff
- Students: 7,485 (2025-2026)
- Athletic conference: UIL Class AAAAA
- District mascot: Pirates
- Colors: Black; Gold

Other information
- Website: www.crandall-isd.net

The Crandall Independent School District (Crandall ISD or CISD) is a school district based in Crandall, in the U.S. state of Texas.

Covering approximately 85 square miles in Kaufman County, the district serves Crandall, portions of Combine, Kaufman, Mesquite, and Seagoville, as well as the Heartland census-designated place.

As of 2026, Crandall ISD operates 9 campuses, including 1 high school, 2 middle schools, 6 elementary schools, and 1 alternative school. The district most recently received a "C" rating from the Texas Education Agency (TEA).

== History ==
In 2021, Wendy Eldredge, then the superintendent, stated that the district territory was suburbanizing when it was previously rural.

In 2024, the district opened an employment training and financial literacy center for students, called the "Junior Achievement Discovery Center".

== Schools ==
=== Secondary schools ===
Secondary schools
Name	Grades	Established	Location	Additional information
Crandall High School	9-12	1903	Crandall	Current facility opened in 2003
Central Middle School	6-8	2025	Crandall	Home to the Crandall-Combine Community Library
Heartland Middle School	6-8	2022	Heartland	Renamed from Crandall MS in 2025

=== Primary schools ===
Primary schools
Name	Grades	Established	Location	Additional information
Dietz Elementary School	PK-5	2017	Heartland	
Martin Elementary School	PK-5	2009	Crandall	
Noble-Reed Elementary School	PK-5	2019	Crandall	
Smith Elementary School	PK-5	2023	Heartland	
Walker Elementary School	PK-5	2009	Heartland	
Wilson Elementary School	PK-5	2009	Crandall	

=== Alternative schools ===
Name	Location	Additional information
Crandall Alternative Education Center	Crandall	Houses CISD's Discipline Alternative Education Program

=== Future schools ===
Name	Projected opening	Location	Additional Information
Baker Elementary School	2027	Crandall	

== See also ==
- List of school districts in Texas
