= Wills Point High School =

Public school in Texas, United States

Location
- 1800 W South Commerce; Wills Point, Texas 75169-2378; United States; 32.70781°N 96.02902°W

Information
- School type: Public high school
- School district: Wills Point Independent School District
- Principal: Jason Phillips
- Staff: 60.68 (FTE)
- Grades: 9-12
- Enrollment: 862 (2023–2024)
- Student to teacher ratio: 14.21
- Colors: Blue, white, and black
- Athletics conference: UIL Class AAAA
- Mascot: Tiger
- Website: wphs.wpisd.com

Wills Point High School is a 4A high school located in Wills Point, Texas (USA). It is part of the Wills Point Independent School District located in northwestern Van Zandt County. Some students also attend from Kaufman County. In 2022–23, the school was rated by the Texas Education Agency as follows: 78 (C) overall, 73 (C) for Student Achievement, 79 (C) for School Progress, and 76 (C) for Closing the Gaps.

== Athletics ==
The Wills Point Tigers compete in the following sports:

Cross Country, Volleyball, Football, Track, Basketball, Tennis, Softball, Golf, and Baseball

=== State Titles ===
- 1965 Football (1A)
- 1983 Boys Singles Tennis (Judd Sanderson)
- 1995 Girls Doubles Tennis (Sara Schreffler/Kelly Kay)
- 2018 Boys Doubles Tennis (Chase Daniell/Kash Adams)

== School Band ==
The school band has placed top 10 in the UIL State Marching Contest for four years in a row under the direction of Nick Kornegay. The band has also had 21 consecutive UIL Sweepstakes and several members over the decade have placed in the All-State Band.

== Media appearances ==
Wills Point High School has appeared on the reality series, The Principal's Office on truTV.
