= Kaufman Lake =

Lake in Texas, United States

- Interactive map of Kaufman Lake
- Coordinates: 32°35′13.7″N 96°15′25.7″W

Kaufman Lake is a lake located east of Kaufman, Texas. The lake is situated east of Texas State Highway 34.
