= McCoy, Kaufman County, Texas =

McCoy, Texas
- Unincorporated community
- Location within Texas Location within the United States
- Coordinates: 32°49′25″N 96°06′27″W
- Country: United States
- State: Texas
- County: Kaufman
- Elevation: 538 ft (164 m)
- Time zone: UTC-6 (Central (CST))
  - Summer (DST): UTC-5 (CDT)
- GNIS feature ID: 1378659

McCoy is an unincorporated community in Kaufman County, located in the U.S. state of Texas. It is located within the Dallas/Fort Worth Metroplex.

== History ==
The area in what is known as McCoy today was first said to be settled around the 1880s and was established as a church community for local farming families. A post office was established at McCoy in 1885 and remained in operation until 1903. Two hundred people were living in McCoy in 1896, alongside six businesses and three churches. The community went into decline for the next four decades. The population dropped sharply to 62 residents during the middle of the Great Depression. The population further dropped to 20 from the 1950s to 1990.

== Geography ==
McCoy is located on Farm to Market Road 429, 5 mi (8.0 km) northeast of Terrell in northeastern Kaufman County.

== Education ==
McCoy had its own school in the 1880s and continued to operate in 1896. Today, the community is served by the Kaufman Independent School District.
