= Kaufman County, Texas =

County in Texas, United States

- County
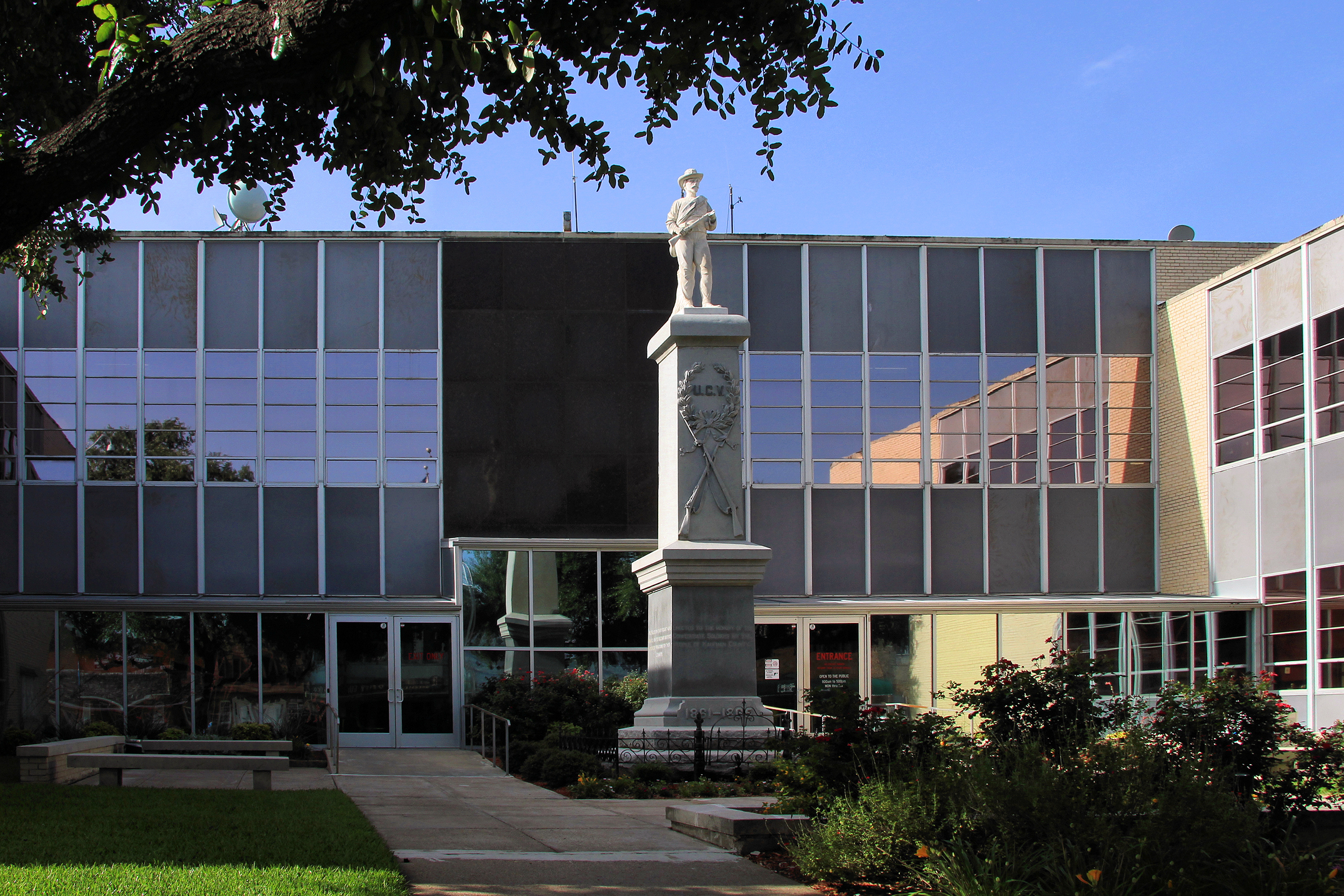
- The Kaufman County Courthouse in Kaufman

- Location within the U.S. state of Texas
- Coordinates: 32.5989°N 96.2884°W
- Country: United States
- State: Texas
- Created: February 26, 1848
- Organized: August 7, 1848
- Named for: David Spangler Kaufman
- Seat: Kaufman
- Largest city: Forney

Area
  - Total: 807.514 sq mi (2,091.45 km^{2})
  - Land: 780.714 sq mi (2,022.04 km^{2})
  - Water: 26.800 sq mi (69.41 km^{2}) 3.32%

Population (2020)
  - Total: 145,310
  - Estimate (2025): 209,235 ▲
  - Density: 186.12/sq mi (71.863/km^{2})
- Time zone: UTC−6 (Central)
  - Summer (DST): UTC−5 (CDT)
- Area code: 214, 469, 972, and 945
- Congressional district: 5th
- Website: kaufmancounty.net

Kaufman County is a county in the northeastern area of the U.S. state of Texas. As of the 2020 census, its population was 145,310, and was estimated to be 209,235 in 2025. The county seat is Kaufman and the largest city is Forney.

== History ==
Kaufman County was created on February 26, 1848 and was organized on August 7, 1848, and the city were named for David S. Kaufman, a U.S. Representative and diplomat from Texas. Kaufman County is part of the Dallas-Fort Worth Metroplex. Western artist Frank Reaugh moved from Illinois to Kaufman County in 1876, where he was directly inspired for such paintings as The Approaching Herd (1902).

== Geography ==
According to the United States Census Bureau, the county has a total area of 807.5 square miles (2,091 km^{2}), of which 26.8 sq mi (69 km^{2}) (3.32%) are covered by water. It is the 203rd-largest county in Texas by total area. Located in the northeast portion of Texas, it is bounded on the southwest by the Trinity River and drained by its east fork.

=== Major highways ===
- Interstate 20
- U.S. Highway 80
- U.S. Highway 175
- State Highway 34
- State Highway 198
- State Highway 205
- State Highway 243
- State Highway 274
- Spur 87
- Spur 226
- Spur 557

=== Lakes ===
- Cedar Creek Reservoir (small part)
- Lake Ray Hubbard (small part)
- Kaufman Lake

=== Adjacent counties ===
- Hunt County – north
- Van Zandt County – east
- Henderson County – south
- Ellis County – southwest
- Dallas County – west
- Rockwall County – northwest

== Communities ==
=== Cities (multiple counties) ===
- Combine (partly in Dallas County)
- Dallas (mostly in Dallas County with small parts in Collin, Denton, Rockwall, and Kaufman Counties)
- Heath (mostly in Rockwall County)
- Mesquite (mostly in Dallas County)
- Poetry (partly in Hunt County)
- Seagoville (mostly in Dallas County)
- Seven Points (mostly in Henderson County)

=== Cities ===
- Cottonwood
- Crandall
- Forney
- Kaufman (county seat)
- Kemp
- Terrell
- Talty

Map showing cities and towns in Kaufman County

=== Towns ===
- Mabank (partly in Henderson County)
- Oak Grove
- Oak Ridge
- Post Oak Bend
- Scurry

=== Villages ===
- Grays Prairie
- Rosser

=== Census-designated places ===
- Elmo
- Heartland
- Travis Ranch

=== Unincorporated communities ===
- Ables Springs
- Abner
- Cobb
- College Mound
- Colquitt
- Gastonia
- Hiram
- Lawrence
- Markout
- McCoy
- Ola
- Prairieville
- Styx
- Tolosa
- Warsaw

=== Ghost towns ===
- Cedar Grove
- Cedarvale
- Jiba
- Peeltown
- Stubbs

== Demographics ==
Historical population
| Census | Pop. | Note | %± |
|---|---|---|---|
| 1850 | 1,047 | | — |
| 1860 | 3,936 | | 275.9% |
| 1870 | 6,895 | | 75.2% |
| 1880 | 15,448 | | 124.0% |
| 1890 | 21,598 | | 39.8% |
| 1900 | 33,376 | | 54.5% |
| 1910 | 35,323 | | 5.8% |
| 1920 | 41,276 | | 16.9% |
| 1930 | 40,905 | | −0.9% |
| 1940 | 38,308 | | −6.3% |
| 1950 | 31,170 | | −18.6% |
| 1960 | 29,931 | | −4.0% |
| 1970 | 32,392 | | 8.2% |
| 1980 | 39,015 | | 20.4% |
| 1990 | 52,220 | | 33.8% |
| 2000 | 71,313 | | 36.6% |
| 2010 | 103,350 | | 44.9% |
| 2020 | 145,310 | | 40.6% |
| 2025 (est.) | 209,235 | ▲ | 44.0% |
U.S. Decennial Census; 1790–1960 1900–1990; 1990–2000 2010–2020

=== 2020 census ===
As of the 2020 census, the county had a population of 145,310. The median age was 35.2 years. 28.7% of residents were under the age of 18 and 12.3% of residents were 65 years of age or older. For every 100 females there were 95.3 males, and for every 100 females age 18 and over there were 92.5 males age 18 and over.

The racial makeup of the county was 60.2% White, 15.1% Black or African American, 1.0% American Indian and Alaska Native, 1.5% Asian, 0.1% Native Hawaiian and Pacific Islander, 9.2% from some other race, and 13.0% from two or more races. Hispanic or Latino residents of any race comprised 24.9% of the population.

58.1% of residents lived in urban areas, while 41.9% lived in rural areas.

There were 47,673 households in the county, of which 43.4% had children under the age of 18 living in them. Of all households, 58.3% were married-couple households, 13.6% were households with a male householder and no spouse or partner present, and 22.4% were households with a female householder and no spouse or partner present. About 17.4% of all households were made up of individuals and 7.4% had someone living alone who was 65 years of age or older.

There were 51,228 housing units, of which 6.9% were vacant. Among occupied housing units, 76.8% were owner-occupied and 23.2% were renter-occupied. The homeowner vacancy rate was 2.4% and the rental vacancy rate was 8.5%.

=== 2020 census ===
Kaufman County, Texas – Racial and ethnic composition Note: the US Census treats Hispanic/Latino as an ethnic category. This table excludes Latinos from the racial categories and assigns them to a separate category. Hispanics/Latinos may be of any race.
| Race / Ethnicity (NH = Non-Hispanic) | Pop 1980 | Pop 1990 | Pop 2000 | Pop 2010 | Pop 2020 | % 1980 | % 1990 | % 2000 | % 2010 | % 2020 |
|---|---|---|---|---|---|---|---|---|---|---|
| White alone (NH) | 29,860 | 41,225 | 54,424 | 72,328 | 78,626 | 76.53% | 78.94% | 76.32% | 69.98% | 54.11% |
| Black or African American alone (NH) | 7,314 | 7,233 | 7,472 | 10,571 | 21,541 | 18.75% | 13.85% | 10.48% | 10.23% | 14.82% |
| Native American or Alaska Native alone (NH) | 66 | 177 | 369 | 551 | 623 | 0.17% | 0.34% | 0.52% | 0.53% | 0.43% |
| Asian alone (NH) | 86 | 212 | 330 | 869 | 2,107 | 0.22% | 0.41% | 0.46% | 0.84% | 1.45% |
| Native Hawaiian or Pacific Islander alone (NH) | x | x | 12 | 32 | 70 | x | x | 0.02% | 0.03% | 0.05% |
| Other race alone (NH) | 35 | 33 | 54 | 69 | 435 | 0.09% | 0.06% | 0.08% | 0.07% | 0.30% |
| Mixed race or Multiracial (NH) | x | x | 727 | 1,382 | 5,743 | x | x | 1.02% | 1.34% | 3.95% |
| Hispanic or Latino (any race) | 1,654 | 3,340 | 7,925 | 17,548 | 36,165 | 4.24% | 6.40% | 11.11% | 16.98% | 24.89% |
| Total | 39,015 | 52,220 | 71,313 | 103,350 | 145,310 | 100.00% | 100.00% | 100.00% | 100.00% | 100.00% |

=== 2000 census ===
As of the 2000 census, there were 71,313 people, 24,367 households, and 19,225 families were residing in the county. The population density was 91 per square mile (35/km^{2}). Its 26,133 housing units averaged 33 per square mile (13/km^{2}). According to the 2000 census, the racial and ethnic makeup of the county was 81.10% White, 10.53% African American, 0.61% Native American, 0.47% Asian, 5.68% from other races, and 1.61% from two or more races. About 11.11% of the population was Hispanic or Latino of any race.

=== American Community Survey 2023 ===
The United States Census Bureau estimated that in 2023, Kaufman County’s population was 185,690. It also estimated that the population was 46.6% non-Hispanic White, 28.1% Hispanic or Latino, 20.8% non-Hispanic Black, 2.2% Asian, 0.4% Native American, 0.1% Pacific Islander, and 1.9% multiracial.

| Race | Total | Percentage |
|---|---|---|
| Hispanic or Latino | 52,087 | 28.1% |
| NH White | 86,611 | 46.6% |
| NH Black | 38,535 | 20.8% |
| NH Asian | 4,061 | 2.2% |
| NH Native American | 737 | 0.4% |
| NH Pacific Islander | 135 | 0.1% |
| NH Multiracial | 3,524 | 1.9% |

== Media ==
Kaufman County is part of the Dallas/Fort Worth DMA. Local media outlets include KDFW-TV, KXAS-TV, WFAA-TV, KTVT-TV, KERA-TV, KTXA-TV, KDFI-TV, KDAF-TV, KFWD-TV, and KDTX-TV. Other nearby stations that provide coverage for Kaufman County come from the Tyler/Longview/Jacksonville market and they include KLTV, KYTX-TV, KFXK-TV, and KETK-TV.

Kaufman County is served by three newspapers, the Terrell Tribune, the Kaufman Herald, and the Forney Messenger. Forney, Texas, is also served by online news media outlet inForney.com, which covers breaking news for the county. A quarterly magazine called Kaufman County Life is produced by the Terrell Tribune. The Kemp and Mabank areas are included in coverage by The Monitor and Athens Daily Review newspapers.

== Law enforcement ==
The Kaufman County Sheriff's Office is Kaufman County's main police force. Smaller cities depend on the sheriff's office, along with the Texas Highway Patrol, for law-enforcement duties.

== Kaufman County murders ==
In December 2012, Texas officials issued a statewide bulletin warning that the Aryan Brotherhood was "actively planning retaliation against law enforcement officials" who worked to prosecute the gang's leadership.

In January 2013, Assistant District Attorney Mark Hasse of Kaufman County was assassinated by gunshot outside the Kaufman County courthouse. On March 30, 2013, District Attorney Mike McLelland, along with his wife, were found shot and killed in their home. On April 13, 2013, ex-justice of the peace Eric Williams was arrested for making terrorist threats to county officials by email. Hasse and McLelland had aggressively prosecuted Williams in a theft case. Williams was convicted, and lost his position and his law license as a result. On April 17, 2013, his wife Kim Williams was arrested on capital murder charges in all three deaths.

Officials did not link these arrests or events to the Aryan Brotherhood. Eric Williams was convicted at trial and sentenced to death on December 16, 2014. Kim Williams pleaded guilty on December 30, 2014, and received a 40-year sentence.

== Politics ==
Prior to 1952, Kaufman County was a Democratic Party stronghold in presidential elections. From 1952 to 1980, it was still primarily Democratic, though the party's margin of victories were far lower than before. Republican Richard Nixon won the county handily in 1972 as part of his national landslide. Starting with the 1984 election, it has become a Republican stronghold, though neither of Bill Clinton's two Republican opponents managed a majority despite winning the county due to Ross Perot's strong third-party candidacy.

The county's Republican lean has lessened a bit due to population growth in the DFW metroplex in recent years, but it still remains strongly Republican. Republicans have consistently won more than 60% of the vote in the county in the 21st century.

Kaufman County is located within District 4 of the Texas House of Representatives. Kaufman County is located within District 2 of the Texas Senate.

United States presidential election results for Kaufman County, Texas
| Year | Republican | | Democratic | | Third party(ies) | |
| Year | No. | % | No. | % | No. | % |
|---|---|---|---|---|---|---|
| 1912 | 248 | 9.31% | 2,039 | 76.51% | 378 | 14.18% |
| 1916 | 427 | 12.63% | 2,780 | 82.25% | 173 | 5.12% |
| 1920 | 573 | 12.84% | 3,070 | 68.80% | 819 | 18.35% |
| 1924 | 884 | 13.54% | 5,573 | 85.33% | 74 | 1.13% |
| 1928 | 1,718 | 39.27% | 2,657 | 60.73% | 0 | 0.00% |
| 1932 | 268 | 6.11% | 4,116 | 93.78% | 5 | 0.11% |
| 1936 | 229 | 5.49% | 3,943 | 94.44% | 3 | 0.07% |
| 1940 | 516 | 8.97% | 5,232 | 90.98% | 3 | 0.05% |
| 1944 | 430 | 8.37% | 4,251 | 82.77% | 455 | 8.86% |
| 1948 | 764 | 15.62% | 3,479 | 71.15% | 647 | 13.23% |
| 1952 | 2,964 | 44.05% | 3,762 | 55.91% | 3 | 0.04% |
| 1956 | 2,816 | 48.97% | 2,902 | 50.47% | 32 | 0.56% |
| 1960 | 2,717 | 47.10% | 3,008 | 52.15% | 43 | 0.75% |
| 1964 | 1,922 | 28.71% | 4,766 | 71.20% | 6 | 0.09% |
| 1968 | 2,431 | 30.04% | 3,311 | 40.92% | 2,350 | 29.04% |
| 1972 | 5,100 | 64.51% | 2,795 | 35.35% | 11 | 0.14% |
| 1976 | 3,867 | 37.90% | 6,302 | 61.76% | 35 | 0.34% |
| 1980 | 5,852 | 47.63% | 6,266 | 51.00% | 169 | 1.38% |
| 1984 | 9,343 | 62.55% | 5,554 | 37.18% | 41 | 0.27% |
| 1988 | 8,466 | 53.19% | 7,358 | 46.23% | 92 | 0.58% |
| 1992 | 6,578 | 34.51% | 6,498 | 34.09% | 5,984 | 31.40% |
| 1996 | 8,697 | 48.34% | 7,383 | 41.03% | 1,913 | 10.63% |
| 2000 | 15,290 | 66.30% | 7,455 | 32.32% | 318 | 1.38% |
| 2004 | 21,304 | 70.16% | 8,947 | 29.46% | 115 | 0.38% |
| 2008 | 23,735 | 67.53% | 11,161 | 31.76% | 249 | 0.71% |
| 2012 | 24,846 | 71.66% | 9,472 | 27.32% | 352 | 1.02% |
| 2016 | 29,587 | 71.70% | 10,278 | 24.91% | 1,400 | 3.39% |
| 2020 | 37,624 | 66.19% | 18,405 | 32.38% | 810 | 1.43% |
| 2024 | 44,063 | 63.49% | 24,726 | 35.63% | 617 | 0.89% |

United States Senate election results for Kaufman County, Texas1
| Year | Republican | | Democratic | | Third party(ies) | |
| Year | No. | % | No. | % | No. | % |
|---|---|---|---|---|---|---|
| 2024 | 41,177 | 59.83% | 26,235 | 38.12% | 1,414 | 2.05% |

United States Senate election results for Kaufman County, Texas2
| Year | Republican | | Democratic | | Third party(ies) | |
| Year | No. | % | No. | % | No. | % |
|---|---|---|---|---|---|---|
| 2020 | 37,649 | 66.67% | 17,507 | 31.00% | 1,315 | 2.33% |
| 2026 | 30,115 | 48.34% | 30,899 | 49.60% | 1,278 | 2.05% |

Texas Gubernatorial election results for Kaufman County
| Year | Republican | | Democratic | | Third party(ies) | |
| Year | No. | % | No. | % | No. | % |
|---|---|---|---|---|---|---|
| 2022 | 28,306 | 66.09% | 14,024 | 32.74% | 501 | 1.17% |
| 2026 | 31,451 | 50.29% | 29,874 | 47.77% | 1,210 | 1.93% |

== Education ==
School districts in the county include:

- Crandall Independent School District
- Forney Independent School District
- Kaufman Independent School District
- Kemp Independent School District
- Mabank Independent School District
- Quinlan Independent School District
- Rockwall Independent School District
- Scurry-Rosser Independent School District
- Terrell Independent School District
- Wills Point Independent School District

It is in the service area for Trinity Valley Community College.

== See also ==
- List of museums in North Texas
- National Register of Historic Places listings in Kaufman County, Texas
- Recorded Texas Historic Landmarks in Kaufman County
