= Terrell High School =

Public high school in Terrell, Texas

- Terrell, Texas; United States

Information
- School type: Public high school
- School district: Terrell Independent School District
- Teaching staff: 90.00 (FTE)
- Grades: 9-12
- Enrollment: 1,467 (2023–2024)
- Student to teacher ratio: 16.30
- Colors: Red and white
- Mascot: Tigers
- Website: www.terrellisd.org/o/ths

Terrell High School is a public high school located in the city of Terrell, Texas, USA and newly classified as a 5A school by the UIL. It is a part of the Terrell Independent School District located in northwest Kaufman County. In 2022–23, the school was rated by the Texas Education Agency as follows: 63 (D) overall, 66 (D) for Student Achievement, 68 (D) for School Progress, and 50 (F) for Closing the Gaps.

== Athletics ==
The Terrell Tigers compete in volleyball, cross country, football, basketball, powerlifting, soccer, golf, tennis, track, baseball, and softball.

=== State titles ===
- Boys Golf, 2A conference (1958–1959 academic year)
- Boys Track & Field, 3A conference (1979–1980 academic year)

== Notable alumni ==
- Bill Conradt – 2006 death of American district attorney
- Jamie Foxx – American comedian and actor (born 1967)
- Kenoy Kennedy – American football player (born 1977)
