= Tramain Jones =

American football player (born 1975)

No. 5, 9, 2
- Position: Defensive specialist

Personal information
- Born: October 20, 1975 (age 51); Dallas, Texas, U.S.
- Listed height: 6 ft 2 in (1.88 m)
- Listed weight: 210 lb (95 kg)

Career information
- College: Angelo State

Career history
- Florida Bobcats (2000–2001); Orlando Predators (2002); Carolina Cobras (2003); Tampa Bay Storm (2004–2006)
- Stats at ArenaFan.com

Tramain Jones (born October 20, 1975) is an American former professional football defensive back who played in the Arena Football League as a defensive specialist.

== Junior college career ==
Jones attended Trinity Valley Community College, and in 1994 as a sophomore he led his team to the NJCAA National football championship.

== NCAA career ==
Jones attended Angelo State University for two years, where he won All-Conference honors twice, was named a first team All-Western Region and the Conference Defensive Back of the Year as a senior, and was named to two different All-America teams after his senior season.

== AFL career ==
Jones had a 6-season career in the Arena Football League. He played for the Florida Bobcats (2000–2001), the Orlando Predators (2002), the Carolina Cobras (2003), the Tampa Bay Storm (2003–2006).
