= Cedar Grove, Texas =

- Unincorporated community
- Location within Texas Location within the United States
- Coordinates: 32°45′28″N 96°05′12″W
- Country: United States
- State: Texas
- County: Kaufman
- Elevation: 571 ft (174 m)
- Time zone: UTC-6 (Central (CST))
  - Summer (DST): UTC-5 (CDT)
- GNIS feature ID: 2034658

Cedar Grove is an unincorporated community in Kaufman County, located in the U.S. state of Texas.
