= Trinity Valley Community College =

College based in Athens, Texas, U.S.

- Type: Public community college
- Established: 1946
- Accreditation: SACSCOC
- President: Jason Morrison
- Undergraduates: 5,426
- Location: Athens (main campus), Texas, United States; 32.194814°N 95.857774°W
- Campus: Rural
- Colors: Red and white
- Mascot: Cardinals
- Website: www.tvcc.edu

Trinity Valley Community College (TVCC) is a public community college based in Athens, Texas. It has six campuses serving five counties across the southeast and eastern parts of the state.

== History ==
TVCC was founded in 1946 as Henderson County Junior College (HCJC) in Athens, the county seat. The current name, adopted in September 1986, was taken from the Trinity River, which bisects the region. By that time it had expanded to serve residents of more than one county.

TVCC began its expansion to a multi-site campus in 1969 when it began to offer courses at a nearby Texas Department of Criminal Justice unit.

- In 1972, courses in Palestine were held for the first time and in 1975 TVCC opened a separate campus facility three miles north of Palestine (the Anderson County seat).
- In 1973 TVCC started offering courses in Terrell (its first expansion into neighboring Kaufman County) and opened a separate campus facility there in 1986.
- In 1983 TVCC opened its first specialized campus, the TVCC Health Science Center in Kaufman (the Kaufman County seat). As of 2022, the site now holds Adult & Continuing Education classes for the area.
- Starting in 2020, TVCC moved the Health Science Center to the former Renaissance Hospital site in Terrell. One of the buildings at the campus holds High School dual credit courses for Health Science in partnership with Terrell ISD.

== Campus locations and service area ==
TVCC operates six public campuses serving the Texas counties of Anderson, Henderson, Van Zandt, Rains, and Kaufman, southeast of the Dallas-Fort Worth metroplex:

Athens

- The Henderson County Campus, which also serves as TVCC's headquarters, is in Athens west of TX-19 on Prarieville Road. This campus also hosts the Pinnacle program that serves Dual-Credit courses on campus for area K-12 ISDs surrounding and including Athens.

Palestine

- The Anderson County Campus is in Palestine on TX-19 north of the US-287 junction headed to Bethel.
- The Palestine Workforce Education Center, located at Palestine Mall on Loop 256 and TX-19 South.

Kaufman

- The Kaufman City Campus is at the site of Texas Health Presbyterian Hospital at the US-175 and TX-243 junction. This was the former site of the Health Science Center from 1986 to 2019.

Terrell

- The Terrell Campus is in Terrell on the eastbound offramp to Wilson Road on Interstate 20.
- The TVCC Health Science Center is also located in Terrell on TX-34 north of I-20. It also operates a distance learning program for the University of Texas at Arlington's RN to BSN program.

TDCJ

In addition, TVCC serves TDCJ Region II Students at prison units in Anderson County outside of Tennessee Colony.

Service Area

As defined by the Texas Legislature, the official service area of TVCC is the following:

- all of Anderson, Henderson, Kaufman and Rains counties,
- the territory of the Terrell Independent School District located within Hunt County, and
- Van Zandt County, excluding those portions within the Grand Saline, Lindale, and Van independent school districts.

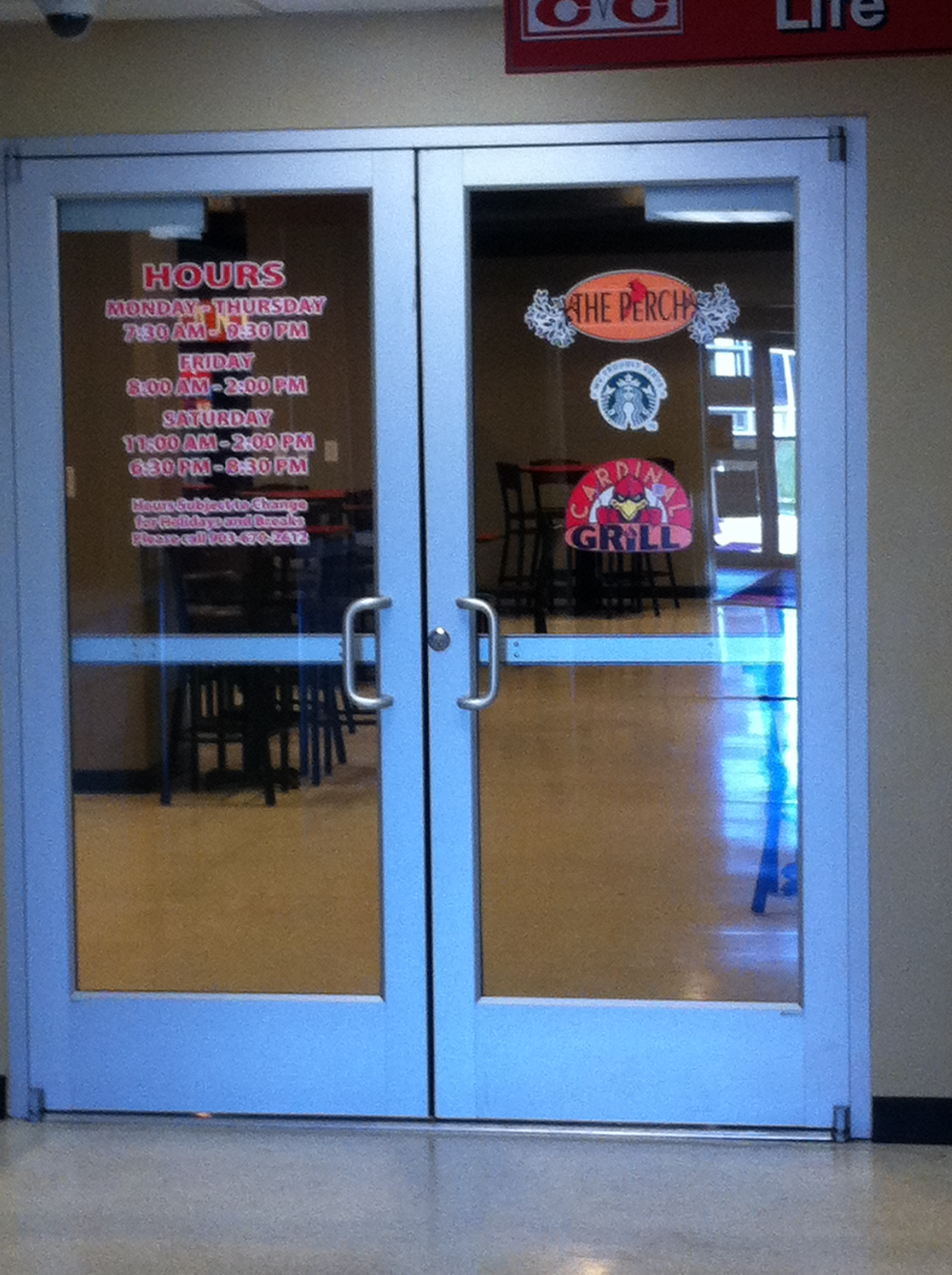
Entrance to Cardinal Grill.

== Athletics ==
Trinity Valley has an athletics program offering the following sports: American football, cheer, dance, volleyball, basketball, softball, and soccer. The Trinity Valley nickname is the Cardinals. An eSports program was also added in the 2019–2020 School Year.

== Notable alumni and persons affiliated with TVCC ==
- Margene Adkins, professional football player
- Darren Benson, professional football player
- Matt Bryant, professional football player
- Rock Cartwright, professional football player
- Albert Connell, professional football player
- Brandon Coleman, professional football player
- Paul Dawson, college football player
- Anthony Dickerson, professional football player
- Shelton Eppler, professional football player
- Todd Fowler, professional football player
- Al Harris, professional football player
- Robert Jackson, professional football player
- Tramain Jones, professional football player
- Shawn Kemp, professional basketball player
- Betty Lennox, professional basketball player
- Roger Muñoz, member of the Nicaragua men's national basketball team
- John Randle, professional football player
- James Scott, professional football player
- Jaime Echenique Former NBA player for the Washington Wizards
- Todd Staples, former Texas Commissioner of Agriculture, is a former faculty member at the Palestine campus
- James Surls, sculptor
- Nick Van Exel, professional basketball player
- Derrick Willies, professional football player
