= Kemp Independent School District =

School district in Texas, United States

Location
- 905 S. Main St. Kemp, Texas Texas Education Agency Region 10 United States

District information
- Type: Public
- Motto: Pride In Excellence
- Grades: K-12
- Superintendent: Dr. James Young
- Schools: 5
- Budget: US$16 million(2011)

Students and staff
- Students: 1566
- Athletic conference: UIL Class 4A
- District mascot: Yellowjackets
- Colors: Orange and White (grey or black accents occasionally used)

Other information
- Website: www.kempisd.org

Kemp Independent School District is a public school district based in Kemp, Texas (USA).

In addition to Kemp, the district serves southern Kaufman County and northwest Henderson County, including parts of Seven Points.

For the 2022–23 school year, the district was rated by the Texas Education Agency as follows: 71 (C) overall, 72 (C) for Student Achievement, 74 (C) for School Progress, and 64 (D) for Closing the Gaps.

== Schools ==
- Kemp High (Grades 9-12)
- Kemp Junior High (Grades 6-8)
- Kemp Intermediate West (Grades 4-5)
- Kemp Intermediate (Grades 2-3)
- Kemp Primary (Grades PK-1)

== Facilities ==
Kemp ISD owns and operates several support, fine arts and athletic facilities.

- Kemp High School Campus Facilities
  - Library
  - Fine Arts wing, including a 650-seat auditorium
  - Band Hall with practice rooms, music library, office, and ensemble room
  - Jacket Stadium featuring a turf field, an all-weather track and metal stands
  - Baseball Stadium featuring a grass field, dugouts, and metal stands
  - Gymnasium
  - Athletic team and Band practice fields
  - Shot-put/Discus Pens
  - Agricultural Barn
  - Athletic Weight Room
- New Kemp Jr. High Campus (Coming Soon)
- Kemp Jr. High School Campus Facilities
  - Cafetorium - a small auditorium used for numerous community events and daily lunch periods
  - Gymnasium
  - Library
- Kemp Intermediate School and Administration Campus Facilities
  - Basketball Courts
  - Gymnasium
  - Board Room
- Kemp Primary School
  - Playground
  - Library
- "Old 40" Support Facilities
  - Kemp ISD Transportation
  - Kemp ISD Maintenance

== Traditions ==
- Colors: Orange and White (grey or black accents also occasionally used)
- Mascot: Yellow Jackets
- Mascot Name: Herbie
- Motto: "Pride in Excellence"

Kemp Homecoming has been held once every four years since 1956. It is known to be the largest event in the community, with thousands of visitors and alumni visiting Kemp during Homecoming weekend. Festivities include class reunions, alumni dinners, a parade, athletic events, and street dances. Many in the community, including students, have proposed a traditional annual Homecoming event for the students while keeping the alumni festivities a quad-annual event.
