= Crandall, Texas =

- City
- Location of Crandall in Kaufman County, Texas
- Coordinates: 32°37′20″N 96°27′12″W
- Country: United States
- State: Texas
- County: Kaufman

Area
  - Total: 4.38 sq mi (11.35 km^{2})
  - Land: 4.38 sq mi (11.35 km^{2})
  - Water: 0 sq mi (0.00 km^{2})
- Elevation: 410 ft (120 m)

Population (2020)
  - Total: 3,860
  - Estimate (2025): 7,730
  - Density: 881/sq mi (340/km^{2})
- Time zone: UTC-6 (Central (CST))
  - Summer (DST): UTC-5 (CDT)
- ZIP code: 75114
- Area codes: 214, 469, 945, 972
- FIPS code: 48-17504
- GNIS feature ID: 2410257
- Website: www.crandalltexas.com

Crandall is a city in Kaufman County, Texas, United States. Its population was estimated at 7,730 in 2025. It began as a railway town, developing alongside the Texas Trunk Railroad in the early 1880s. Crandall is named after Cornelius F. Crandall, who had previously founded Crandall, Indiana.

== Geography ==
Crandall is located in western Kaufman County. U.S. Route 175 passes through the north side of the city, leading northwest 24 miles (39 km) to the center of Dallas and southeast 9 miles (14 km) to Kaufman.

According to the United States Census Bureau, the city of Crandall has a total area of 3.2 square miles (8.3 km^{2}), of which 0.0 acres (0.061 m^{2}), or 0.07%, is covered by water.

== Demographics ==
Historical population
Census	Pop.	Note	%±
1890	251		—
1950	727		—
1960	640		−12.0%
1970	774		20.9%
1980	831		7.4%
1990	1,652		98.8%
2000	2,774		67.9%
2010	2,858		3.0%
2020	3,860		35.1%
2025 (est.)	7,730		100.3%
U.S. Decennial Census

=== 2020 census ===
As of the 2020 census, Crandall had a population of 3,860. The median age was 35.1 years; 28.6% of residents were under 18 and 10.9% were 65 or older. For every 100 females, there were 96.2 males, and for every 100 females 18 and over, there were 91.9 males 18 and over.

None of residents lived in urban areas, while 100.0% lived in rural areas.

Of thee 1,324 households in Crandall, 43.5% had children under 18 living in them, 61.3% were married-couple households, 11.8% were households with a male householder and no spouse or partner present, and 21.6% were households with a female householder and no spouse or partner present. About 16.7% of all households were made up of individuals, and 6.4% had someone living alone who was 65 or older. The census counted 968 families living in the city.

The city had 1,381 housing units, of which 4.1% were vacant. The homeowner vacancy rate was 1.2% and the rental vacancy rate was 7.9%.

Racial composition as of the 2020 census
Race	Number	Percent
White	3,123	80.9%
Black or African American	178	4.6%
American Indian and Alaska Native	31	0.8%
Asian	22	0.6%
Native Hawaiian and other Pacific Islander	1	0.0%
Some other race	212	5.5%
Two or more races	293	7.6%
Hispanic or Latino (of any race)	651	16.9%

== Education ==
The city is served by the Crandall Independent School District (ISD). Schools in the Crandall ISD are Hollis T. Dietz Elementary School, W.A. Martin Elementary School, Noble-Reed Elementary School, Barbara Walker Elementary School, Nola Kathryn Wilson Elementary School, Opal Smith Elementary School, Crandall Middle School, Crandall High School, and Crandall Compass Academy.

The Crandall-Combine Community Library is within Central Middle School in Crandall. The library was previously in Crandall High School.

== Climate ==
The climate in this area is characterized by hot, humid summers and generally mild to cool winters. According to the Köppen climate classification, Crandall has a humid subtropical climate, Cfa on climate maps.

== In popular culture ==
Bonnie and Clyde and Boys Don't Cry each filmed scenes in Crandall, while the episode "1800 Days to Justice" of Route 66 was filmed completely in Crandall, but takes place in the fictional town of Harcourt Junction.
