= Wills Point Independent School District =

School district in Texas, United States

Location
- Wills Point, TX ESC Region 10 USA

District information
- Type: Public
- Grades: Pre-K through 12
- Superintendent: Richard Cooper

Students and staff
- Athletic conference: UIL Class AAAA
- District mascot: tiger
- Colors: Blue and White

Other information
- Website: www.wpisd.com

Wills Point Independent School District is a school district based in Wills Point, Texas (USA) and covering all of the city of Wills Point as well as the communities of Hiram, Myrtle Springs, Scott, Elwood, Cobb, Frog, Elmo, and the surrounding unincorporated areas in both Van Zandt and Kaufman counties.

The district includes the Elmo census-designated place.

For the 2022–23 school year, the district was rated by the Texas Education Agency as follows: 78 (C) overall, 71 (C) for Student Achievement, 79 (C) for School Progress, and 76 (C) for Closing the Gaps.

== Schools ==
=== High school ===
- Wills Point High School

=== Middle schools ===
- Wills Point Middle School
- Wills Point Jr. High School

=== Elementary schools ===
- Wills Point Primary School
- Earnest O. Woods Intermediate School

== See also ==
- List of school districts in Texas

== Links/References ==
- Official website
- TEA Report
