= Terrell Independent School District =

School district in Texas, United States

Terrell Independent School District is a public school district based in Terrell, Texas, United States.

For the 2022–23 school year, the district was rated by the Texas Education Agency as follows: 63 (D) overall, 62 (D) for Student Achievement, 65 (D) for School Progress, and 58 (F) for Closing the Gaps.

== School uniforms ==
All TISD students are required to wear school uniforms .

== Schools ==
- Terrell High School (Grades 9-12)
- Herman Furlough, Jr. Middle School (Grades 6-8)
- Dr. Bruce Wood Elementary School (Grades K-5)
- J.W. Long Elementary School (Grades K-5)
- Gilbert Willie, Sr. Elementary School (Grades K-5)
- W.H. Burnett Early Childhood Center (Serving three- and four-year olds)

Alternative Campuses

- Global Leadership Academy
- Terrell Alternative Education Center (TAEC)
- Terrell ISD Child & Adolescent Center
