= Terrell, Texas =

- City
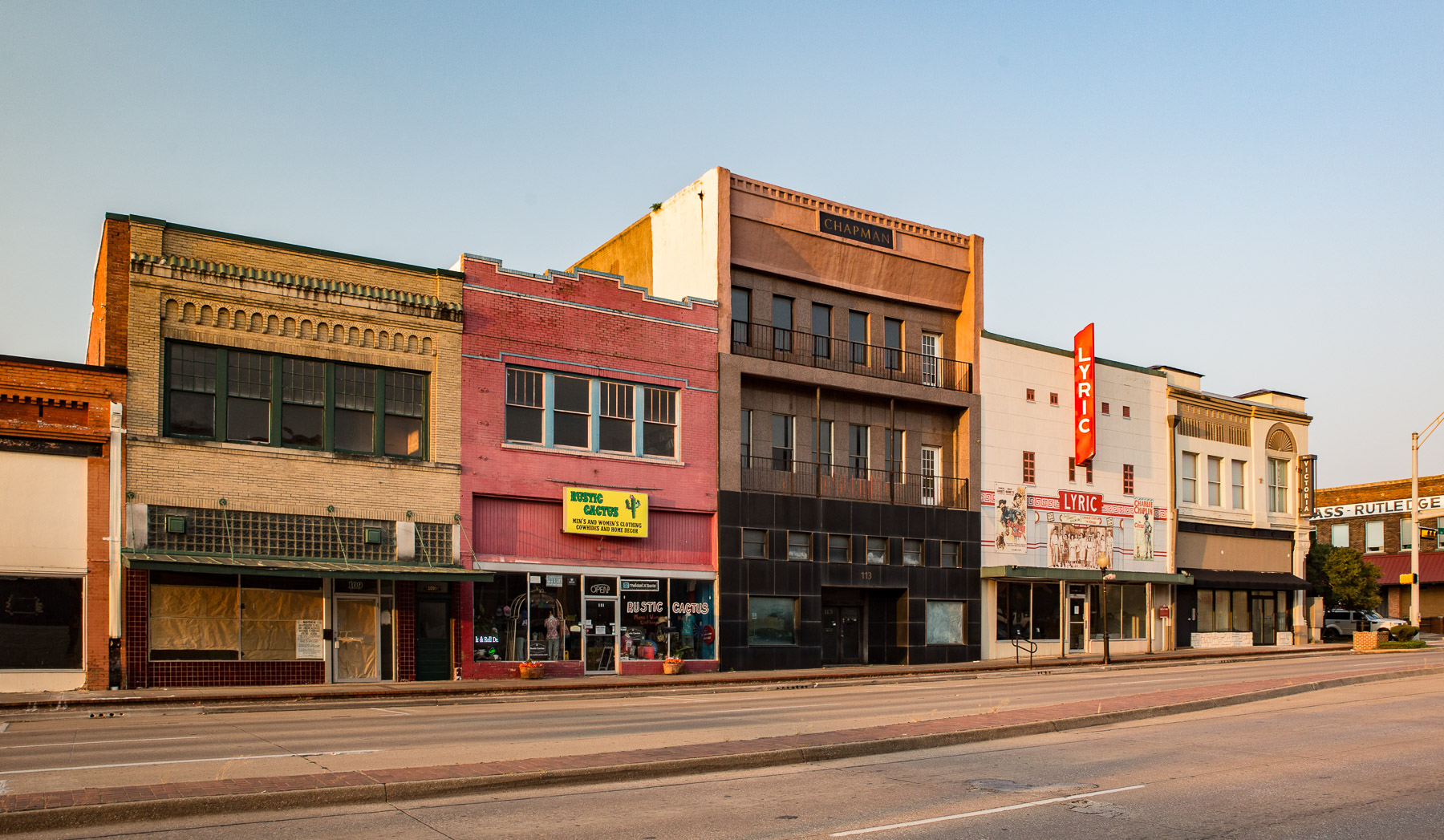
- Downtown Terrell, Texas (2021)
- Motto: "Building a Better Community"
- Location of Terrell in Kaufman County, Texas
- Coordinates: 32°44′10″N 96°16′31″W
- Country: United States
- State: Texas
- County: Kaufman
- Incorporated (city): 1874

Government
  - Type: Council-Manager

Area
  - Total: 27.33 sq mi (70.78 km^{2})
  - Land: 26.95 sq mi (69.80 km^{2})
  - Water: 0.38 sq mi (0.98 km^{2})
- Elevation: 522 ft (159 m)

Population (2020)
  - Total: 17,465
  - Density: 648.1/sq mi (250.2/km^{2})
- Time zone: UTC-6 (Central (CST))
  - Summer (DST): UTC-5 (CDT)
- ZIP codes: 75160-75161
- Area codes: 214, 469, 945, 972
- FIPS code: 48-72284
- Website: cityofterrell.org

Terrell is a city in the U.S. state of Texas, located in Kaufman County. As of the 2020 census, its population was 17,465. Terrell is located about 32 miles (51 km) east of Dallas.

== History ==
Terrell developed as a railroad town, beginning in 1873 with the construction of the Texas and Pacific Railroad line. The town was named for Robert A. Terrell, a pioneer European-American settler whose farm lay on its western edge. He built an octagonal house on his property, called "Round House", to provide better defense against attacks by Native Americans. His house was later fitted with the first glass windows in the county. The community was incorporated in 1875. The first automobile appeared in 1899.

In 1892, Terrell was a sundown town that largely prohibited African Americans from living there.

The Terrell Military College was established in Terrell, operating until after World War II. Its campus was sited on part of the former Terrell farm and incorporated his historic Round House. In 1949, the Southern Bible Institute, based in Dallas and affiliated with the Churches of Christ, bought the military college property and transferred their operations here, renaming their institution Southwestern Christian College. It is a private, historically black college. The Round House has been preserved on campus, and is one of 20 such structures in the nation.

The headquarters of the 3rd Battalion, 144th Infantry Regiment of the Texas Army National Guard was also located in Terrell.

== Geography ==
Terrell is located in northern Kaufman County. U.S. Route 80 passes through the city center, leading west to Dallas and east 15 miles (24 km) to Wills Point. Interstate 20 passes through the south side of the city, leading west 19 miles (31 km) to Interstate 635 in the southeastern suburbs of Dallas (Balch Springs) and east 27 miles (43 km) to Canton. Texas State Highway 34 passes through the east side of Terrell, leading northeast 32 miles (51 km) to Greenville and south 12 miles (19 km) to Kaufman, the county seat.

According to the United States Census Bureau, Terrell has a total area of 20.0 square miles (51.8 km^{2}), of which 0.3 square miles (0.9 km^{2}), or 1.74%, is covered by water.

=== Climate ===
The climate in this area is characterized by hot, humid summers and generally mild to cool winters. According to the Köppen climate classification, Terrell has a humid subtropical climate, Cfa on climate maps.

== Demographics ==
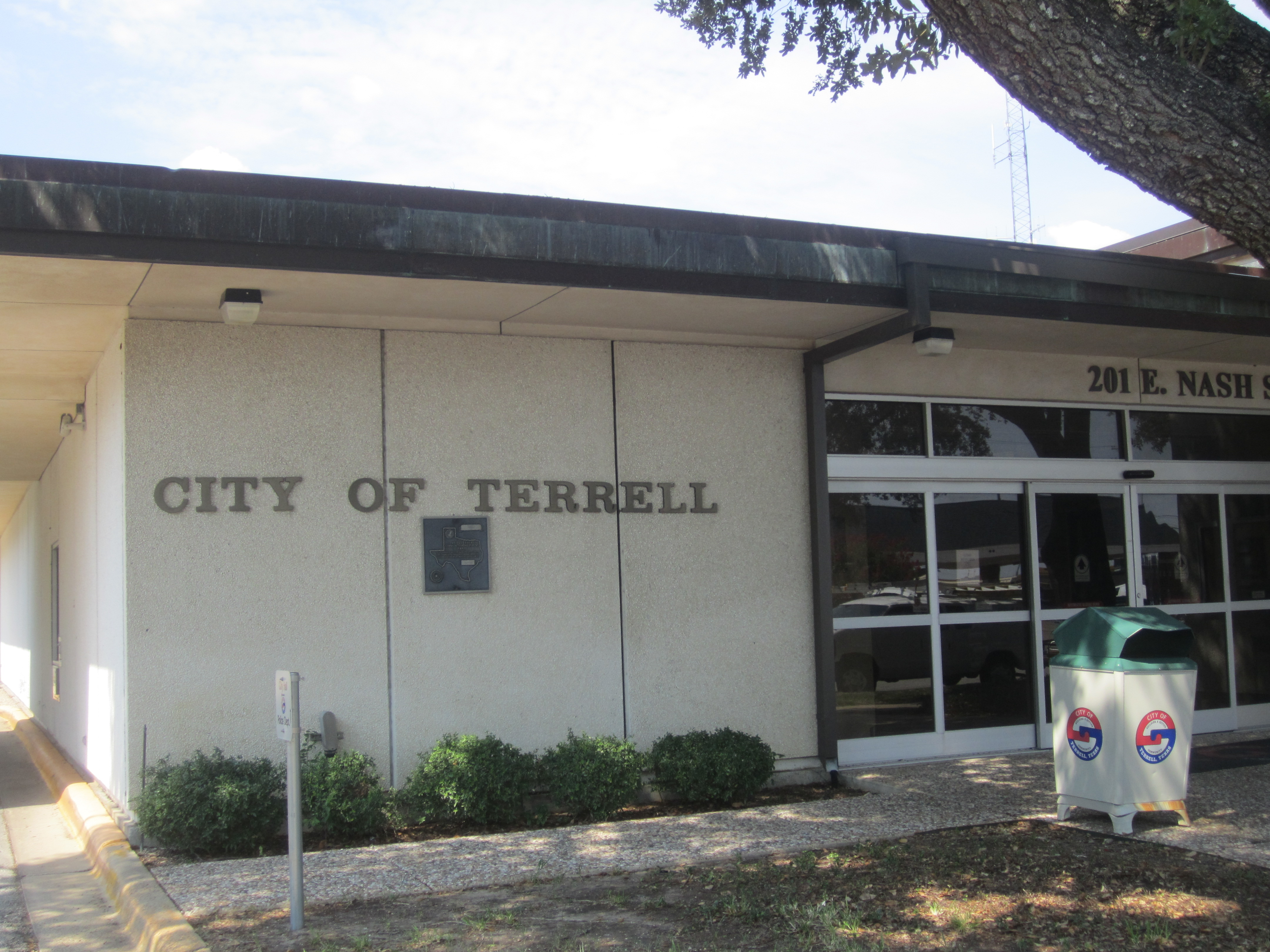
Terrell City Hall

Historical population
Census	Pop.	Note	%±
1880	2,003		—
1890	2,988		49.2%
1900	6,330		111.8%
1910	7,050		11.4%
1920	8,349		18.4%
1930	8,795		5.3%
1940	10,481		19.2%
1950	11,544		10.1%
1960	13,803		19.6%
1970	14,182		2.7%
1980	13,169		−7.1%
1990	12,490		−5.2%
2000	13,606		8.9%
2010	15,816		16.2%
2020	17,465		10.4%
2023 (est.)	21,480		23.0%
U.S. Decennial Census

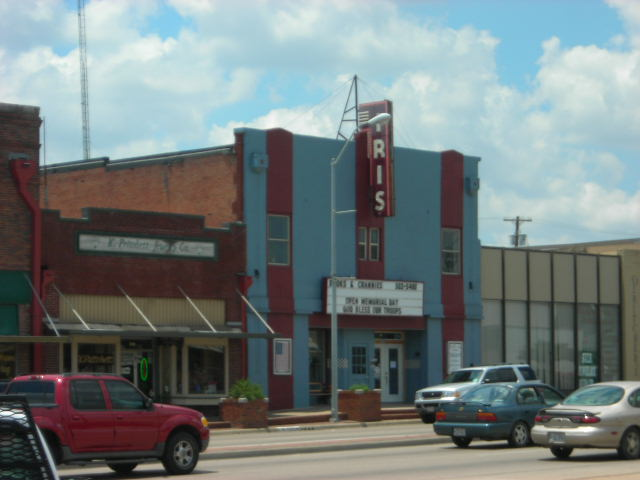
Iris Theatre in downtown Terrell

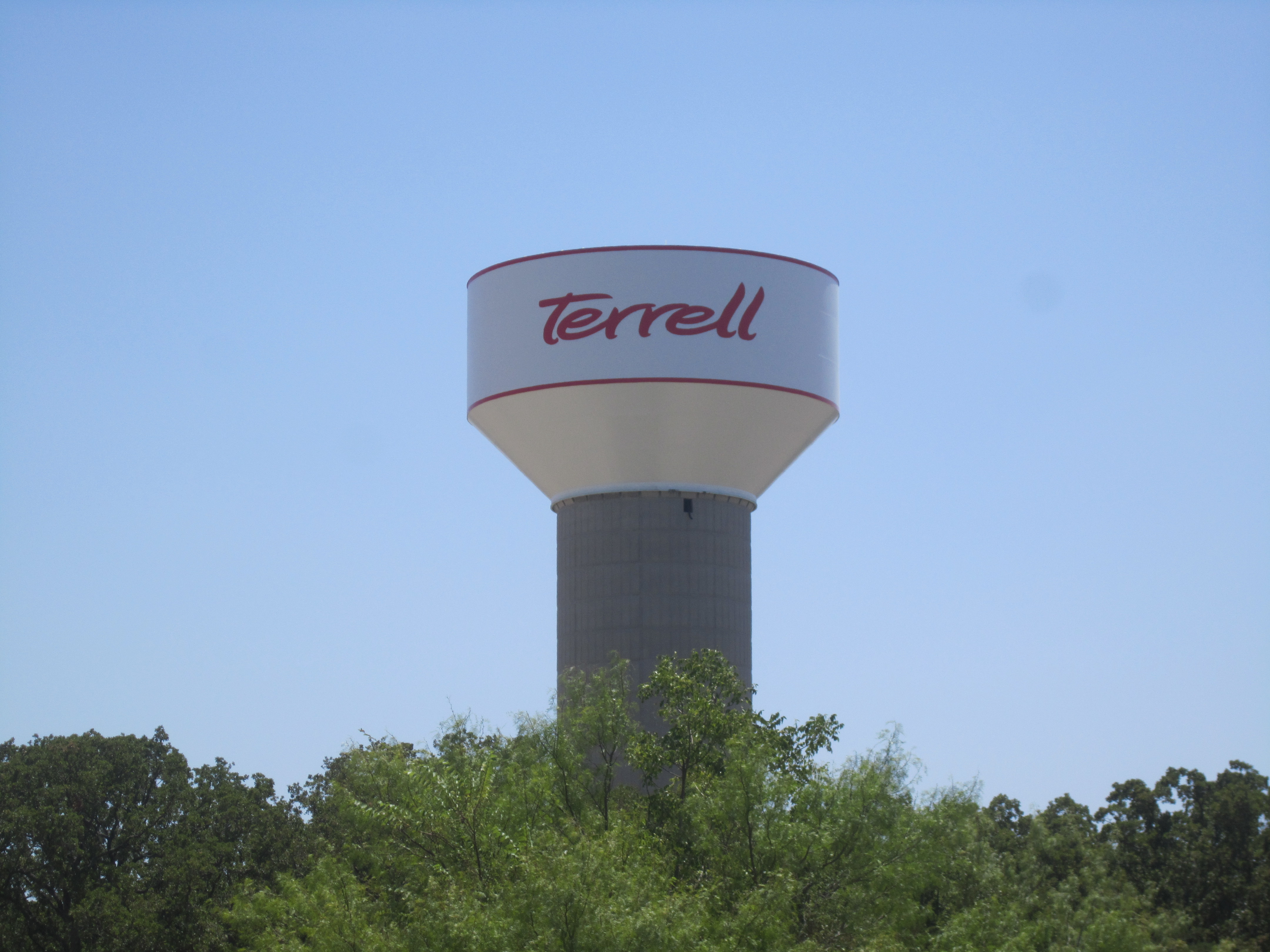
Terrell water tower

=== 2020 census ===
As of the 2020 census, Terrell had a population of 17,465, with 6,084 households and 4,111 families residing in the city.

The median age was 35.2 years; 26.5% of residents were under 18 and 15.6% were 65 or older. For every 100 females, there were 89.6 males, and for every 100 females 18 and over, there were 86.0 males 18 and over.

About 94.9% of residents lived in urban areas, while 5.1% lived in rural areas.

Of the 6,084 households in Terrell, 37.4% had children under 18 living in them, 40.9% were married-couple households, 17.8% were households with a male householder and no spouse or partner present, and 34.6% were households with a female householder and no spouse or partner present. About 25.7% of all households were made up of individuals, and 11.8% had someone living alone who was 65 or older.

The city had 6,499 housing units, of which 6.4% were vacant. The homeowner vacancy rate was 2.2% and the rental vacancy rate was 5.3%.

Racial composition as of the 2020 census
Race	Number	Percent
White	7,675	43.9%
Black or African American	4,567	26.1%
American Indian and Alaska Native	152	0.9%
Asian	145	0.8%
Native Hawaiian and other Pacific Islander	4	0.0%
Some other race	2,372	13.6%
Two or more races	2,550	14.6%
Hispanic or Latino (of any race)	5,427	31.1%

== Arts and culture ==
=== British Flying Training School ===
During World War II, the No. 1 British Flying Training School was located in Terrell. It was the first of six civilian flight schools in the United States dedicated to instructing British Royal Air Force (RAF) pilots during that war. This followed an international training concept similar to that previously implemented during World War I near Fort Worth at Camp Taliaferro.

Terrell Municipal Airport hosts the No. 1 British Flying Training School Museum, which has an extensive record of the school. In 2000, the museum was instrumental in honoring four RAF airmen who died in a crash during World War II. The four, flying from Terrell, encountered difficulties over the Kiamichi Mountains of Oklahoma. The AT6 Monument, whose dedication made international headlines with many from Terrell and the United Kingdom present, marks the spot of one of the crashes. City, state, and even international dignitaries gathered in Terrell on Friday, September 16, 2011, to mark the opening of the new Major William F. Long Terminal Building.

=== World War II veterans reunion ===
The City of Terrell, in partnership with the No. 1 British Flying Training School Museum, hosts an annual World War II veterans' reunion and air event on the first Saturday of October. This event draws attendees from all over the world. It presents numerous attractions such as vintage aircraft and military vehicles, skydiving, flight simulators, lectures, films, demonstrations, and activities for every member of the family. The reunion dinner and hangar dance are on Friday night, and the fly-in kicks off with a pancake breakfast on Saturday morning, followed by a ceremony and entertainment until the afternoon.

=== Terrell Jubilee ===
Terrell Jubilee, held the third weekend in April at Ben Gill Park, is a family celebration with a BBQ cook-off, museum tours, arts and crafts exhibition, carnival, live music, a quilt show, an auto show, and other attractions.

== Education ==
=== Public schools ===
The city is zoned to schools in Terrell Independent School District.

- Terrell High School (grades 9–12)
- Herman Furlough, Jr. Middle School (grades 6–8)
- Dr. Bruce Wood Intermediate School (prekindergarten-grade 5) serving the west side of Terrell
- J.W. Long Elementary School (prekindergarten-grade 5) serving the east side of Terrell
- Gilbert Willie Sr. Elementary School (prekindergarten-grade 5)
- W.H. Burnett Early Childhood Center (three- and four-year olds)

In 2010, Terrell Independent School District voted to rezone the district into east and west for grades 3–6. The city is divided along Rockwall St. and then further along a line with no specific boundary.

=== Colleges ===
Trinity Valley Community College operates the Kaufman County Campus in Terrell.

Southwestern Christian College is a private, historically black college affiliated with the Churches of Christ. It offers a four-year degree for ministerial studies, and two-year associate degrees in liberal arts and technical specialties.

== Infrastructure ==
=== Health care ===
Terrell is the location of the Terrell State Hospital, a psychiatric inpatient hospital with 316 beds operated under the direction of the Texas Department of State Health Services.

== Notable people ==
- Harry Ables, baseball player
- Betty Brown, politician
- Louis Conradt, attorney
- Robert H. Dennard, electrical engineer who invented DRAM and identified MOSFET scaling law (known as Dennard scaling)
- Jamie Foxx, two-time Grammy Award-winning musician and singer and Academy Award-winning actor
- Lance Gooden, U.S. congressman since 2019
- Robert Hardy, British actor; trained in Terrell as pilot during the Second World War
- Jimmy Harris, football defensive back and quarterback
- Kenoy Kennedy, football safety
- Willie B. Kennedy, second African-American member of the San Francisco Board of Supervisors
- Brice McCain, football cornerback
- Laci Mosley, actress
- Cynthea Rhodes, a member of the US track and field team in the 1996 Summer Olympics in Atlanta
- Ricky Donnell "Freeway Ricky" Ross, former drug kingpin
- Randy Snow, tennis player
- C. J. Wilson, American football cornerback for the Tampa Bay Buccaneers, Chicago Bears, and NC State
- Darrius Johnson, football cornerback, two-time Super Bowl champion, Denver Broncos, Kansas City Chiefs

== See also ==
- List of sundown towns in the United States
