= Kaufman, Texas =

City in Texas, US

- City
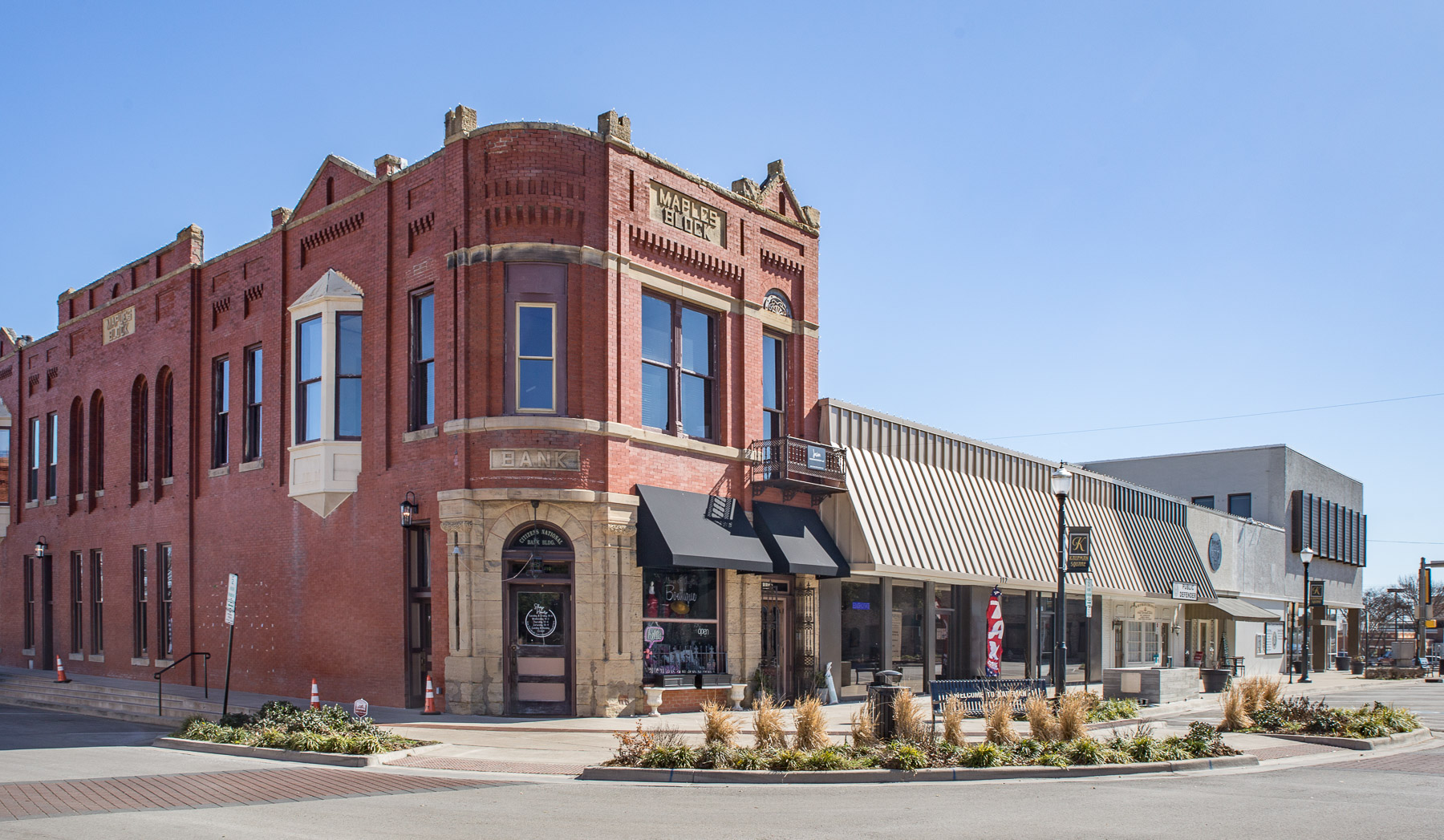
- Maples Block in downtown Kaufman (2022)
- Motto(s): "Progress, Tradition"
- Location of Kaufman in Kaufman County, Texas
- Coordinates: 32°35′27″N 96°21′28″W
- Country: United States
- State: Texas
- County: Kaufman

Area
  - Total: 9.22 sq mi (23.88 km^{2})
  - Land: 9.05 sq mi (23.45 km^{2})
  - Water: 0.17 sq mi (0.43 km^{2})
- Elevation: 446 ft (136 m)

Population (2020)
  - Total: 6,797
  - Density: 750.7/sq mi (289.9/km^{2})
- Time zone: UTC-6 (Central (CST))
  - Summer (DST): UTC-5 (CDT)
- ZIP code: 75142
- Area codes: 214, 469, 945, 972
- FIPS code: 48-38488
- GNIS feature ID: 2410167
- Website: www.kaufmantx.org

Kaufman is a city in and the county seat of Kaufman County, Texas, United States. Its population was 6,797 at the 2020 census.

== History ==
Kaufman was founded as "Kings Fort", named after Dr. William P. King, who established the fort in 1840 after purchasing 2.5 square miles (6.5 km^{2}) of land where the city is now located. The community was renamed "Kingsboro" after five years of growth. In 1852, Kingsboro was renamed "Kaufman" after the newly formed Kaufman County, which in turn was named after David S. Kaufman.

Kaufman was the first place that Bonnie Parker, of Bonnie and Clyde, was incarcerated.

Nearby Camp Kaufman was used as a German POW camp during World War II.

== Geography ==
U.S. Route 175, a four-lane, limited-access highway, passes through the southwest side of the city, leading northwest 33 miles (53 km) to Dallas and southeast 39 miles (63 km) to Athens. Texas State Highway 34 passes through the south and east sides of the city, leading north 12 miles (19 km) to Terrell and southwest 26 miles (42 km) to Ennis. State Highway 243 leads east from Kaufman 27 miles (43 km) to Canton.

According to the United States Census Bureau, Kaufman has a total area of 8.5 square miles (22.1 km^{2}), of which 0.2 sq mi (0.5 km^{2}), or 2.08%, is covered by water.

=== Climate ===
The climate in this area is characterized by hot, humid summers and generally mild to cool winters. According to the Köppen climate classification, Kaufman has a humid subtropical climate, Cfa on climate maps.

== Demographics ==
Historical population
Census	Pop.	Note	%±
1880	490		—
1890	1,282		161.6%
1900	2,378		85.5%
1910	1,959		−17.6%
1920	2,501		27.7%
1930	2,279		−8.9%
1940	2,654		16.5%
1950	2,714		2.3%
1960	3,087		13.7%
1970	4,012		30.0%
1980	4,658		16.1%
1990	5,238		12.5%
2000	6,490		23.9%
2010	6,703		3.3%
2020	6,797		1.4%
2025 (est.)	10,717		57.7%
U.S. Decennial Census

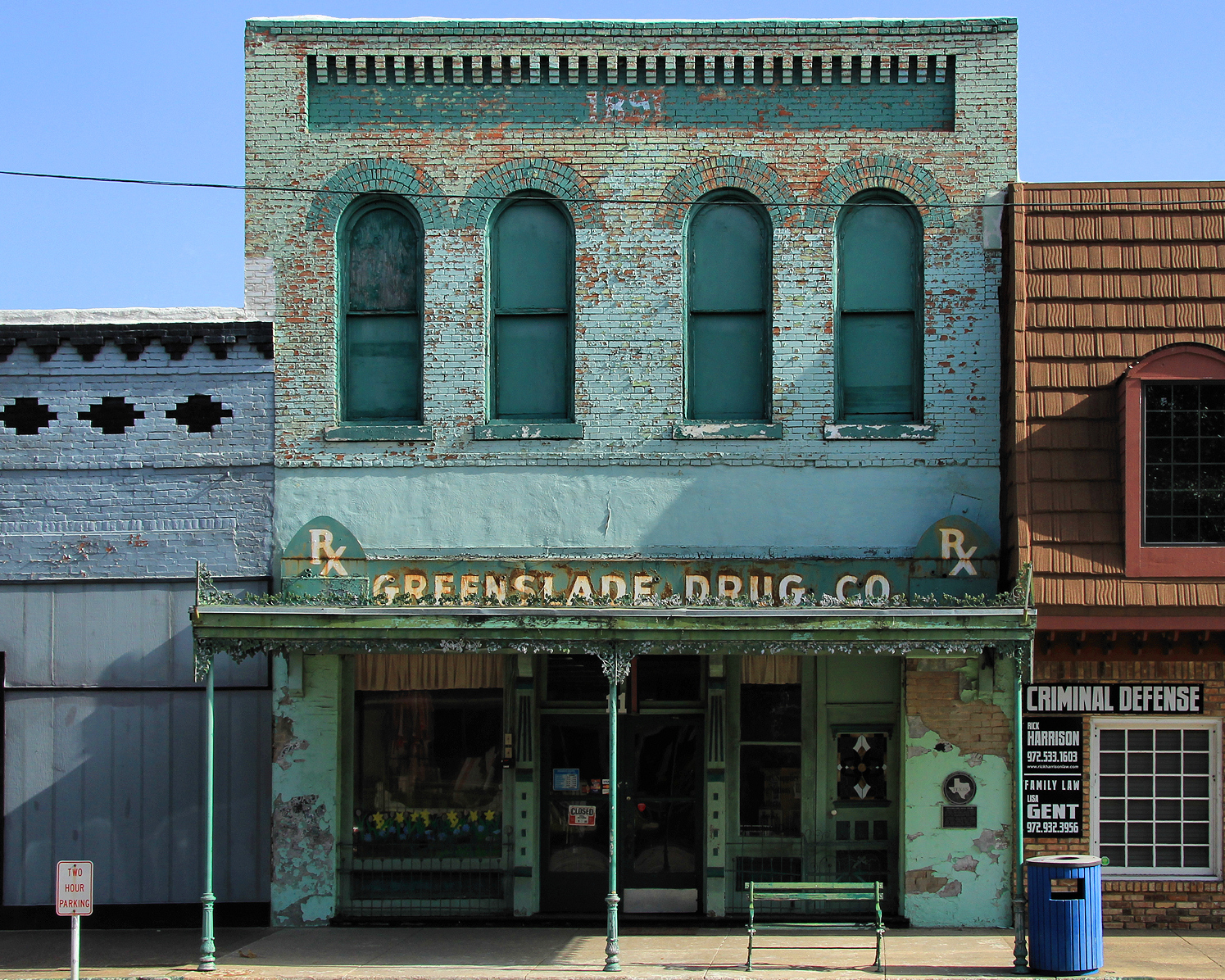
The Greenslade Drug Store in Kaufman

=== 2020 census ===
As of the 2020 census, Kaufman had a population of 6,797. The median age was 33.4 years; 28.3% of residents were under 18 and 13.8% were 65 or older. For every 100 females, there were 90.7 males, and for every 100 females 18 and over, there were 86.3 males 18 and over.

The census recorded 2,344 households, including 1,427 families; 42.0% had children under 18 living in them, 44.0% were married-couple households, 16.3% were households with a male householder and no spouse or partner present, and 31.8% were households with a female householder and no spouse or partner present. About 24.2% of all households were made up of individuals, and 11.5% had someone living alone who was 65 or older.

The city had 2,569 housing units, of which 8.8% were vacant. The homeowner vacancy rate was 3.1% and the rental vacancy rate was 7.4%.

About 90.1% of residents lived in urban areas, while 9.9% lived in rural areas.

Kaufman racial composition as of the 2020 census (Note: Note: the US Census treats Hispanic/Latino as an ethnic category. This table excludes Latinos from the racial categories and assigns them to a separate category. Hispanics/Latinos can be of any race.)
Race	Number	Percent
White	3,858	56.8%
Black or African American	630	9.3%
American Indian and Alaska Native	65	1.0%
Asian	66	1.0%
Native Hawaiian and other Pacific Islander	5	0.1%
Some other race	955	14.1%
Two or more races	1,218	17.9%
Hispanic or Latino (of any race)	2,554	37.6%

== Sports ==
Kaufman was home to minor league baseball. The 1915 Kaufman Kings played as members of the Class D level Central Texas League before the league disbanded.

== Education ==
=== Public schools ===
Kaufman and surrounding portions of Kaufman County are served by the Kaufman Independent School District.

=== Private schools ===
Honors Academy operates the Legacy Academy, a grades 6–12 charter school, in Kaufman.

Kaufman Christian School, a church-run school with classes from prekindergarten to 12th grade, also serves the area.

=== Colleges and universities ===
Trinity Valley Community College operates its Health Science Center in Kaufman.

== Transport ==
Hall Airport was a privately owned, public-use airport located about 6.8 miles southeast of Kaufman's central business district. The airport had one runway, designated "17/35", with a turf surface measuring 2,585 by 40 feet (788 x 12 m).

== Notable people ==
- Craig Birdsong, NFL defensive back for the Houston Oilers
- Ted Healy, comedian, actor, and promoter of the Three Stooges
- Sonny Strait, voice actor
- Pooh Shiesty was incarcerated here

== See also ==
- List of World War II prisoner-of-war camps in the United States
