= Dallas–Fort Worth metroplex =

Coordinates: 32°45′47″N 97°01′57″W

Dallas–Fort Worth
- Conurbation
- Dallas–Fort Worth–Arlington, TX metropolitan statistical area
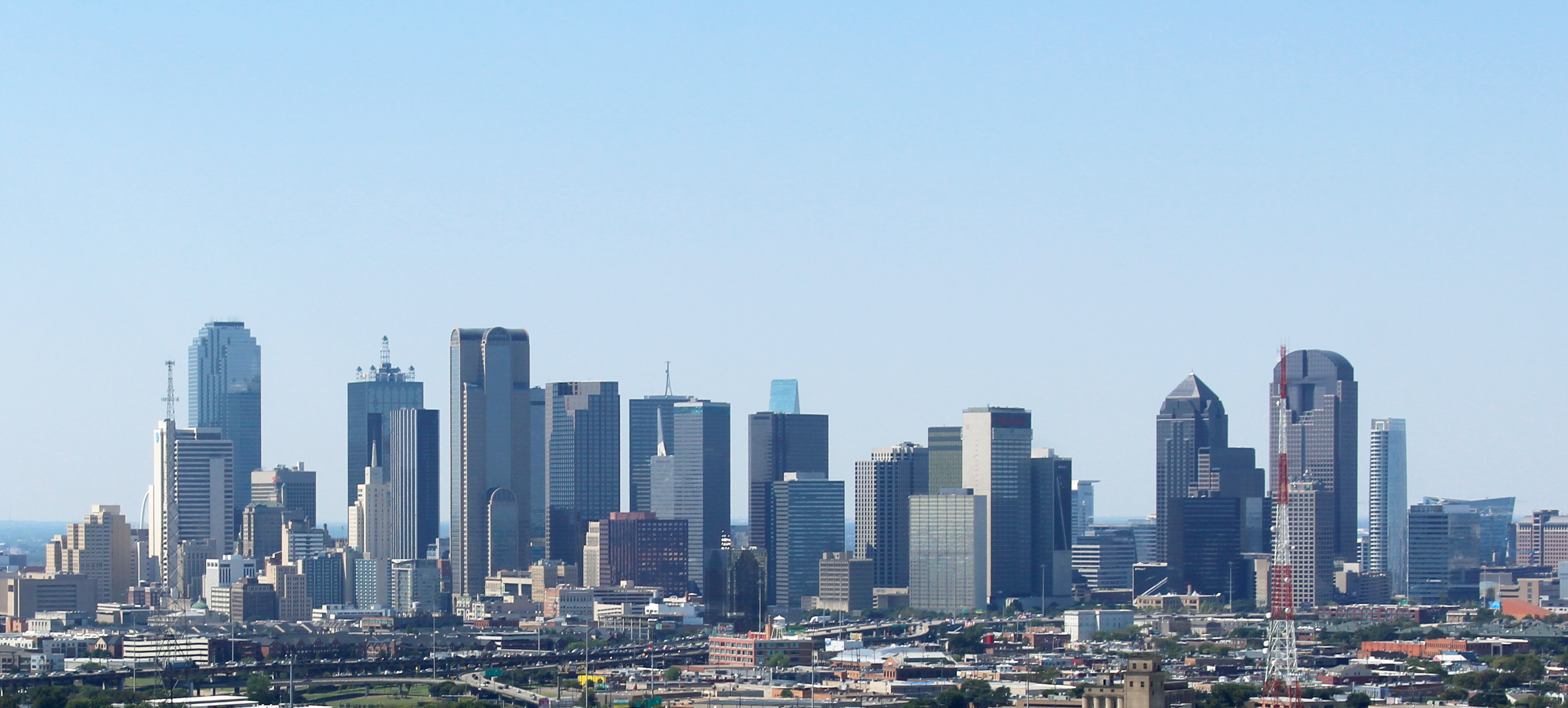
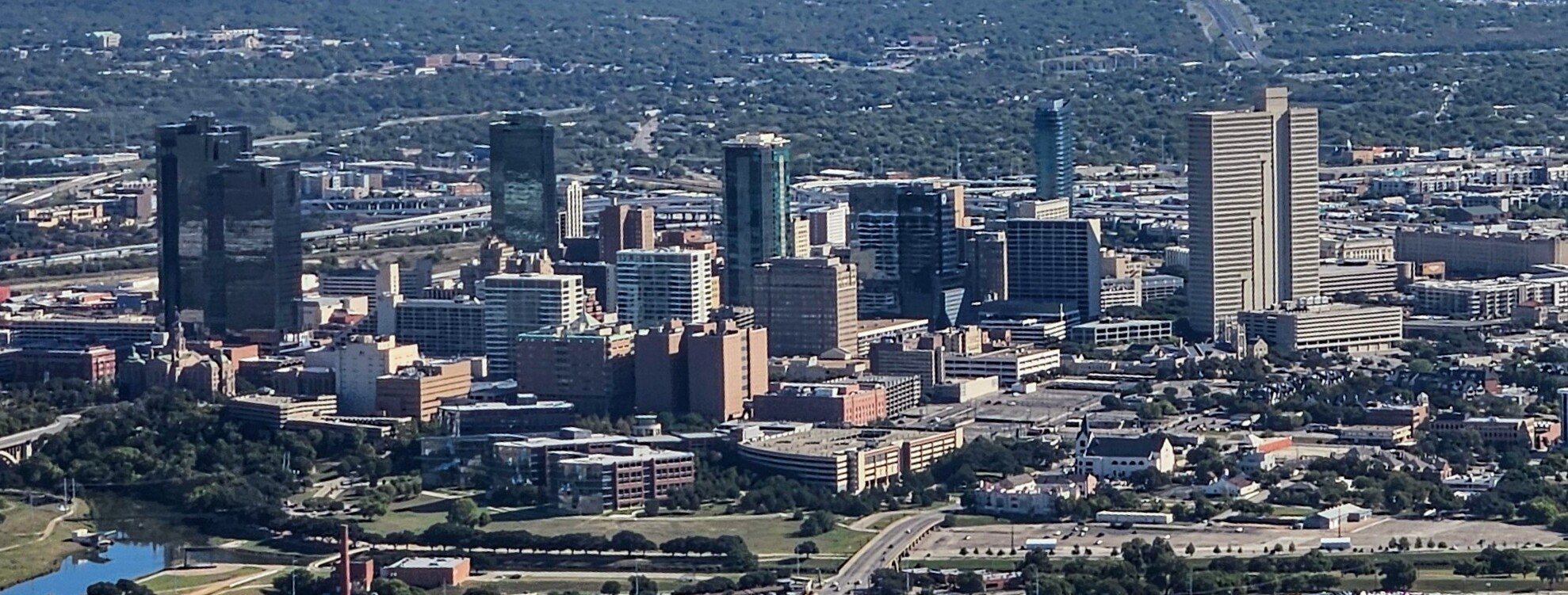
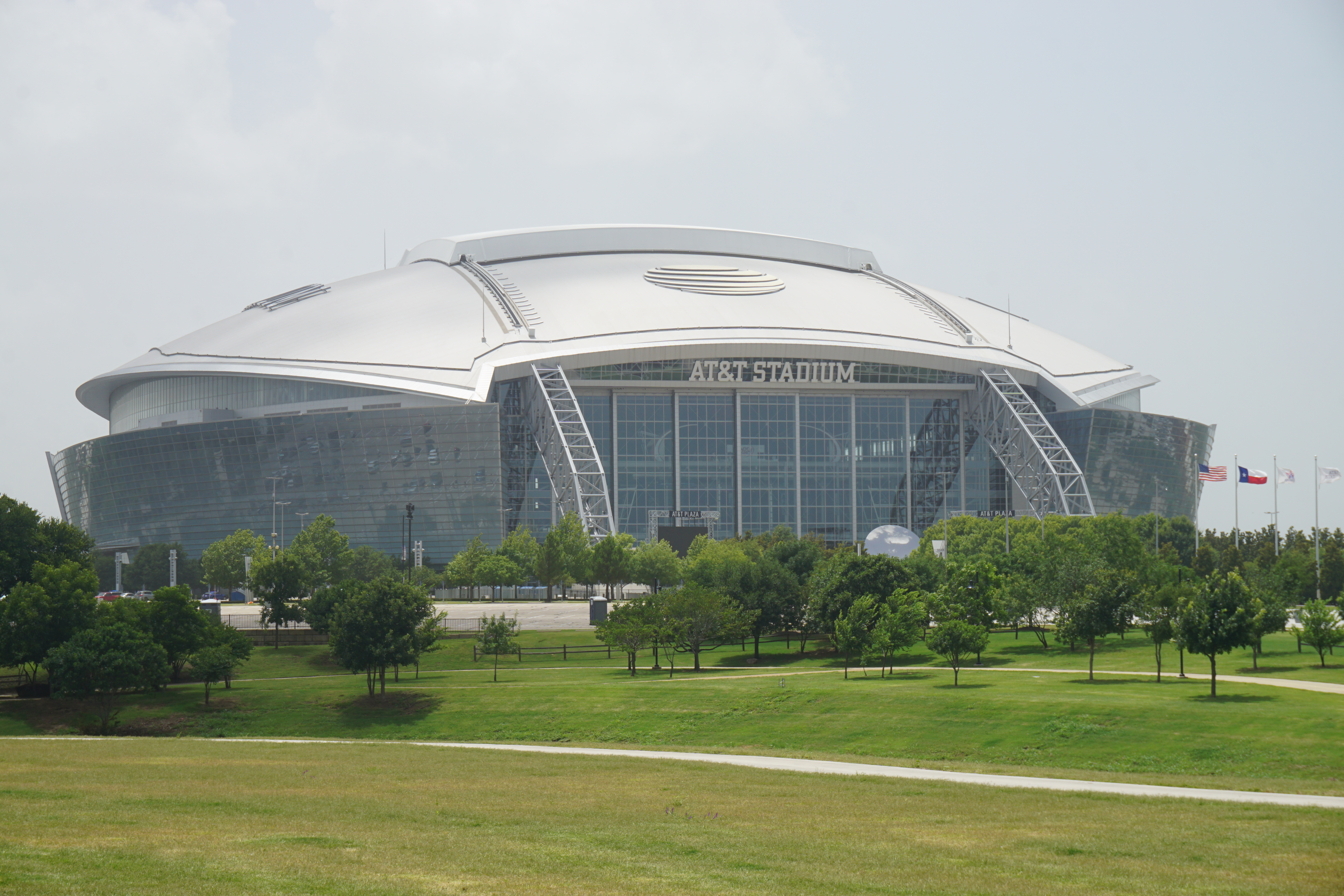
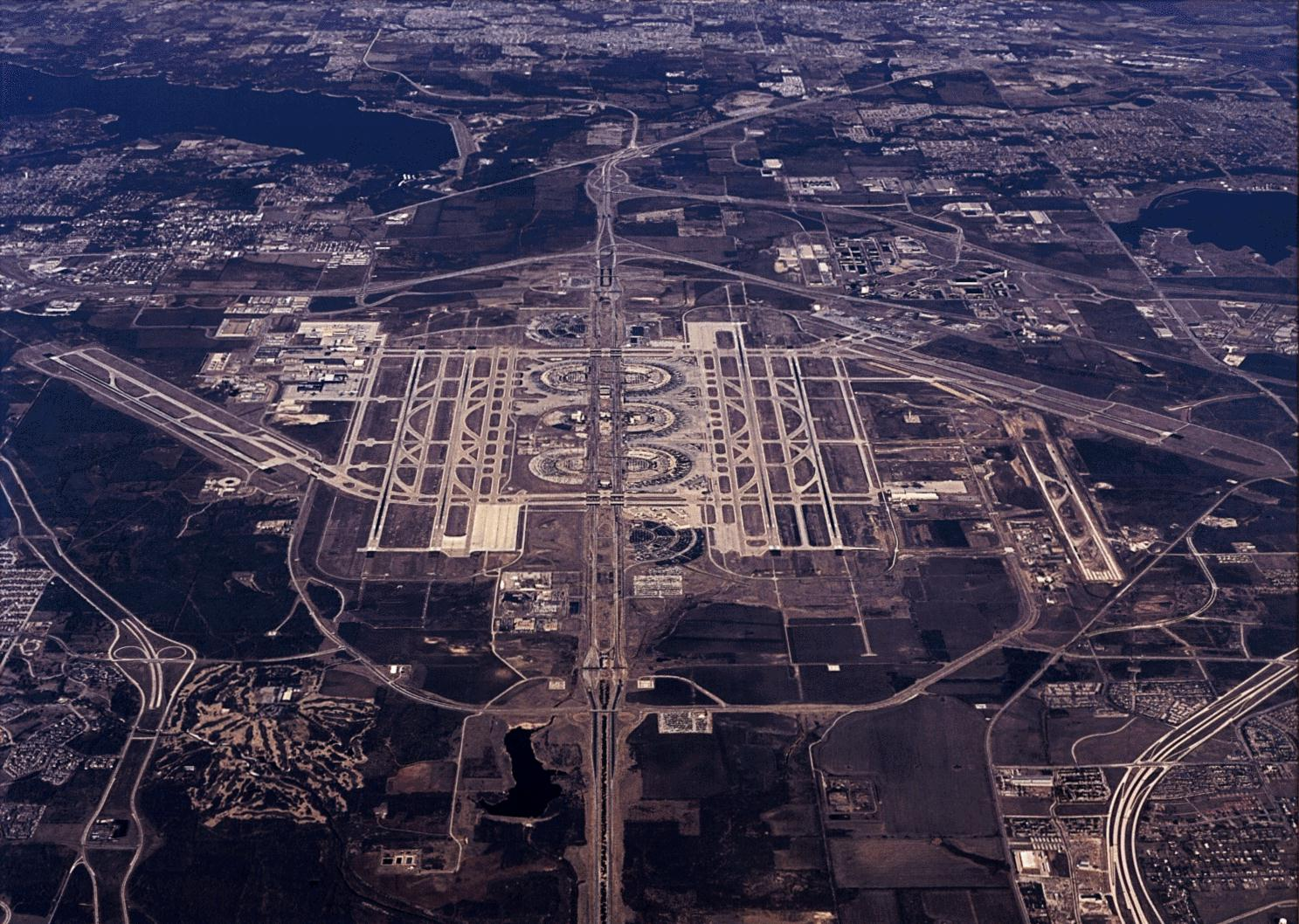
- Dallas Fort Worth Arlington International Airport
Map of Dallas–Fort Worth, TX–OK CSA
City of Dallas
City of Fort Worth
City of Arlington
Dallas–Fort Worth–Arlington, TX MSA
Dallas–Plano–Irving, TX Metropolitan Division
Fort Worth–Arlington–Grapevine, TX
Other statistical areas in Dallas–Fort Worth CSA
Sherman–Denison, TX MSA
Athens, TX µSA
Granbury, TX µSA
Corsicana, TX µSA
Durant, OK µSA
Gainesville, TX µSA
Sulphur Springs, TX µSA
Bonham, TX µSA
Mineral Wells, TX µSA
- Country: United States
- State(s): Texas; Oklahoma
- Principal cities: Dallas; Fort Worth; Arlington; Plano; Irving; Denton; Richardson; Grapevine

Area
  - Conurbation: 16,302 sq mi (42,222 km^{2})
  - Urban: 1,746.90 sq mi (4,524.44 km^{2})
  - Metro: 9,300 sq mi (24,100 km^{2})
- Highest elevation: 1,549 ft (472 m)

Population (2020 census)
  - Conurbation: 8,344,032 (4th)
  - Urban: 5,843,632 (6th)
  - Urban density: 3,281.5/sq mi (1,266.98/km^{2})
  - Metro density: 880/sq mi (339.9/km^{2})
  - MSA: 8,344,032 (4th)
  - CSA: 9,021,108 (6th)

GDP
  - MSA: $770.229 billion (2024)
- Time zone: UTC-6 (CST)
  - Summer (DST): UTC-5 (CDT)
- Area codes: 214, 430, 469, 682, 817, 903, 940, 945, 972

The Dallas–Fort Worth metroplex, officially designated the Dallas–Fort Worth–Arlington metropolitan statistical area by the U.S. Office of Management and Budget, (Note: This area has carried different official names in the past: with and without capitalization, with hyphens or slashes instead of dashes, with or without spaces around punctuation marks, and with or without "Arlington", such as "Dallas–Fort Worth–Arlington Statistical Area". The short form has often been rendered, especially in government documents, as "Dallas–Fort Worth–Arlington, TX Metro Area", using the U.S. Postal Service code "TX" for Texas, and often without the syntactically expected comma in ",TX", which the Post Office omits. Still other versions include the full word "Texas", with other words sometimes used, e.g. "Dallas–Fort Worth–Arlington Urbanized Area".) is the most populous metropolitan statistical area in the U.S. state of Texas and the Southern U.S., encompassing 11 counties. Its historically dominant core cities are Dallas and Fort Worth. It is the economic and cultural hub of North Texas. Residents of the area also refer to it as DFW (the code for Dallas Fort Worth International Airport) or the Metroplex. The Dallas–Fort Worth–Arlington metropolitan statistical area's population was 7,637,387 according to the U.S. Census Bureau's 2020 census, making it the fourth-largest metropolitan area in the U.S. and the tenth-largest in the Americas. In 2016, the Dallas–Fort Worth metroplex had the highest annual population growth in the United States. In 2024, the U.S. Census Bureau estimated that the Dallas–Fort Worth metropolitan area's population had increased to 8,344,032.

The metropolitan region's economy is primarily based on banking, commerce, insurance, telecommunications, technology, energy, healthcare, medical research, transportation, manufacturing, and logistics. As of 2022, Dallas–Fort Worth is home to 23 Fortune 500 companies, the fourth-largest concentration of Fortune 500 companies in the United States behind New York City (62), Chicago (35), and Houston (24). In 2016, the metropolitan economy surpassed that of Houston, the second-largest metro area in Texas, to become the fourth-largest in the U.S. The Dallas–Fort Worth metroplex boasted a GDP of just over $620.6 billion in 2020 (although both metropolitan regions have switched places multiple times since GDP began recording). If the Metroplex were a sovereign state, it would have the 22nd largest economy in the world as of 2026. In 2015, the conurbated metropolitan area would rank the ninth-largest economy if it were a U.S. state.

The Dallas–Fort Worth metroplex comprises the highest concentration of colleges and universities in Texas. The UT Southwestern Medical Center is home to six Nobel Laureates and was ranked No. 1 in the world among healthcare institutions in biomedical sciences. The Metroplex is also the second most popular metropolis for megachurches in Texas (trailing the Greater Houston metropolitan area), ranked the largest Christian metropolitan statistical area in the U.S., and has one of the largest LGBT communities in Texas since 2005.

== Etymology ==
A portmanteau of metropolis and complex, the term metroplex is credited to Harve Chapman, an executive vice president with Dallas-based Tracy-Locke, one of three advertising agencies that worked with the North Texas Commission on strategies to market the region. The NTC copyrighted the term "Southwest Metroplex" in 1972 as a replacement for the previously ubiquitous "North Texas", which studies had shown lacked identifiability outside the state. In fact, only 38 percent of a survey group identified Dallas and Fort Worth as part of "North Texas", with the Texas Panhandle also a perceived correct answer, being the northernmost region of Texas.

== Geography ==
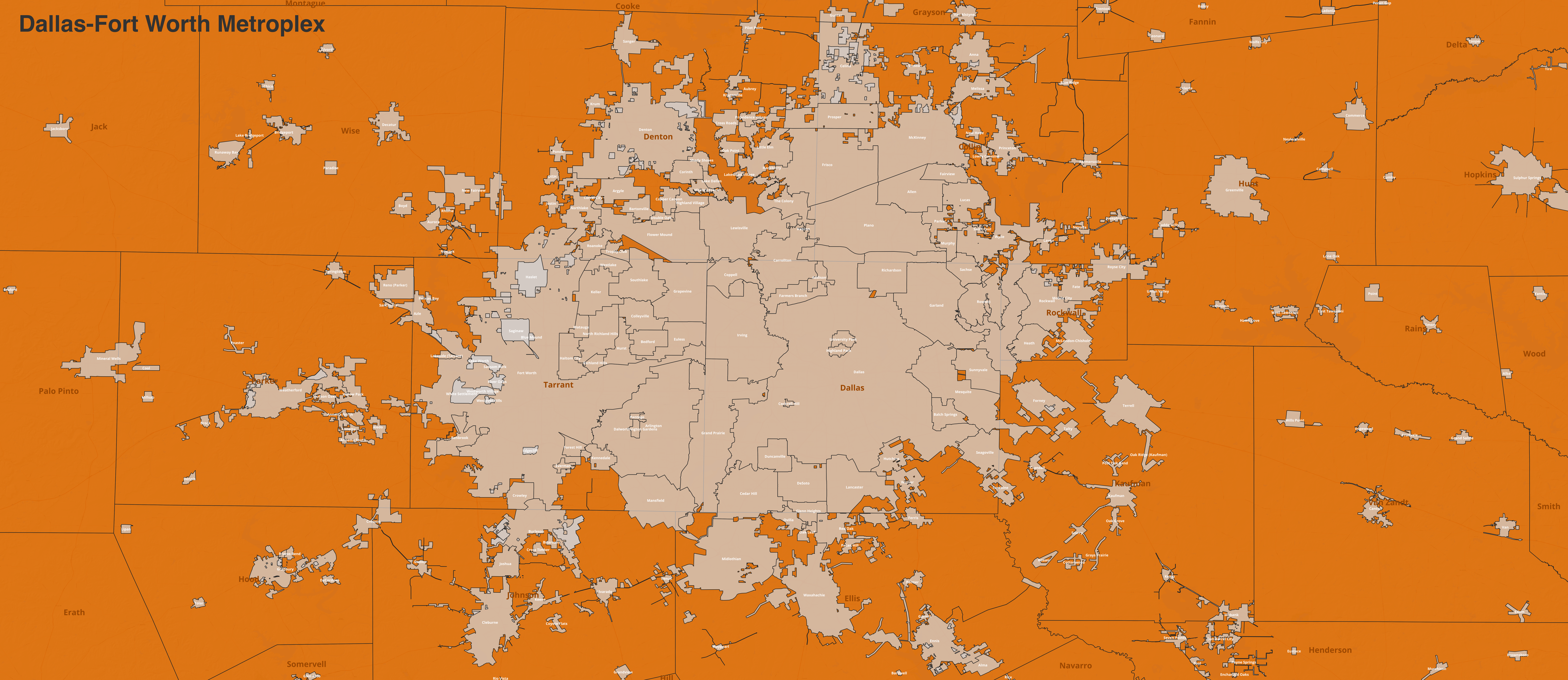
Dallas–Fort Worth metroplex

The United States Census Bureau determined the Metroplex encompasses 9,286 sq mi (24,050 km^{2}) of total area; 8,991 sq mi (23,290 km^{2}) is land, and 295 sq mi (760 km^{2}) is covered by water. The conurbated metropolitan area is larger in area than the U.S. states of Rhode Island and Connecticut combined, and larger than New Jersey. If the metropolitan area were a sovereign state, it would rank the 162nd largest state by total area after Lebanon. The U.S. Office of Management and Budget combines the Dallas–Fort Worth metroplex with the Sherman–Denison metropolitan area and seven micropolitan statistical areas to form the Dallas–Fort Worth TX–OK combined statistical area.

The Dallas–Fort Worth metroplex overlooks mostly prairie land with rolling hills dotted by human-made lakes cut by streams, creeks and rivers surrounded by forested land. The Dallas–Fort Worth metroplex is situated in the Texas blackland prairies region, so named for its fertile black soil found especially in the rural areas of Collin, Dallas, Ellis, Hunt, Kaufman, and Rockwall counties.

Many areas of Denton, Johnson, Parker, Tarrant, and Wise counties are located in the Fort Worth Prairie region of North Texas, which has less fertile and more rocky soil than that of the Texas blackland prairie; most of the rural land on the Fort Worth Prairie is ranch land. A large onshore natural gas field, the Barnett Shale, lies underneath this area; Denton, Tarrant and Wise counties feature many natural gas wells. Continuing land use change results in scattered crop fields surrounded by residential or commercial development. South of Dallas/Fort Worth is a line of rugged hills that goes north to south about fifteen miles (24 km) that looks similar to the Texas Hill Country 200 miles (320 km) to the south.

=== Metropolitan divisions and counties ===
1915 map of Dallas and Tarrant counties

The Dallas–Fort Worth–Arlington metropolitan statistical area is formed by a combination of two separate metropolitan statistical divisions. The Dallas–Plano–Irving MDA and Fort Worth–Arlington–Grapevine MDA come together to form one full metropolitan area or conurbation.

==== Dallas–Plano–Irving metropolitan division ====
- Collin
- Dallas
- Denton
- Ellis
- Hunt
- Kaufman
- Rockwall

==== Fort Worth–Arlington–Grapevine metropolitan division ====
- Johnson
- Parker
- Tarrant
- Wise

=== Climate ===
Dallas–Fort Worth has a humid subtropical climate (Köppen climate classification: Cfa).

It is also continental, characterized by a relatively wide annual temperature range for the latitude. The Dallas–Fort Worth metroplex is located at the lower end of Tornado Alley, and can experience extreme weather.

In the Metroplex, summers are very hot and humid, although low humidity characteristics of desert locations can appear at any time of the year. July and August are typically the hottest months, with an average high of 96.0 °F (36 °C) and an average low of 76.7 °F (25 °C). Heat indexes regularly surpass 105 °F (41 °C) at the height of summer. The all-time record high is 113 °F (45 °C), set on June 26 and 27, 1980 during the Heat Wave of 1980 at nearby Dallas/Fort Worth International Airport.

Winters in the area are cool to mild, with occasional cold spells. The average date of first frost is November 12, and the average date of last frost is March 12. January is typically the coldest month, with an average daytime high of 56.8 °F (14 °C) and an average nighttime low of 37.3 °F (3 °C). The normal daily average temperature in January is 47.0 °F (8 °C) but sharp swings in temperature can occur, as strong cold fronts known as "Blue Northers" pass through the Metroplex, forcing daytime highs below the 50 °F (10 °C) mark for several days at a time and often between days with high temperatures above 80 °F (27 °C). Snow accumulation is seen in the city in about 70% of winter seasons, and snowfall generally occurs 1–2 days out of the year for a seasonal average of 1.5 inches (4 cm). Some areas in the region, however, receive more than that, while other areas receive negligible snowfall or none at all. The all-time record low temperature within the city is −3 °F (−19 °C), set on January 18, 1930, however the temperature at Dallas/Fort Worth International Airport reached −2 °F (−19 °C) on February 16, 2021, during Winter Storm Uri.

Climate data for Dallas (Love Field), 1991–2020 normals, (Note: Mean monthly maxima and minima calculated based on data at said location from 1991 to 2020.) extremes 1913–present (Note: Official records for Dallas were kept at the Weather Bureau Office in downtown from 15 October 1913 to August 1940, and at Love Field since September 1940.)
Month	Jan	Feb	Mar	Apr	May	Jun	Jul	Aug	Sep	Oct	Nov	Dec	Year
Record high °F (°C)	88 (31)	95 (35)	97 (36)	100 (38)	103 (39)	112 (44)	112 (44)	111 (44)	110 (43)	100 (38)	92 (33)	89 (32)	112 (44)
Mean maximum °F (°C)	76.7 (24.8)	80.5 (26.9)	85.9 (29.9)	89.0 (31.7)	95.0 (35.0)	98.9 (37.2)	103.6 (39.8)	104.1 (40.1)	99.1 (37.3)	92.5 (33.6)	82.9 (28.3)	77.9 (25.5)	105.5 (40.8)
Mean daily maximum °F (°C)	57.7 (14.3)	62.0 (16.7)	69.9 (21.1)	77.4 (25.2)	84.9 (29.4)	92.7 (33.7)	96.9 (36.1)	97.1 (36.2)	90.0 (32.2)	79.5 (26.4)	67.8 (19.9)	59.2 (15.1)	77.9 (25.5)
Daily mean °F (°C)	47.8 (8.8)	52.0 (11.1)	59.6 (15.3)	67.1 (19.5)	75.4 (24.1)	83.3 (28.5)	87.3 (30.7)	87.3 (30.7)	80.1 (26.7)	69.1 (20.6)	57.8 (14.3)	49.5 (9.7)	68.0 (20.0)
Mean daily minimum °F (°C)	37.9 (3.3)	41.9 (5.5)	49.4 (9.7)	56.8 (13.8)	66.0 (18.9)	73.8 (23.2)	77.7 (25.4)	77.4 (25.2)	70.1 (21.2)	58.7 (14.8)	47.8 (8.8)	39.8 (4.3)	58.1 (14.5)
Mean minimum °F (°C)	22.5 (−5.3)	26.5 (−3.1)	31.1 (−0.5)	41.3 (5.2)	52.0 (11.1)	64.2 (17.9)	70.8 (21.6)	69.4 (20.8)	56.8 (13.8)	42.0 (5.6)	31.2 (−0.4)	25.1 (−3.8)	19.1 (−7.2)
Record low °F (°C)	−3 (−19)	2 (−17)	11 (−12)	30 (−1)	39 (4)	53 (12)	56 (13)	57 (14)	36 (2)	26 (−3)	17 (−8)	1 (−17)	−3 (−19)
Average precipitation inches (mm)	2.59 (66)	2.78 (71)	3.45 (88)	3.15 (80)	4.57 (116)	3.83 (97)	2.54 (65)	2.31 (59)	3.10 (79)	4.79 (122)	2.93 (74)	3.23 (82)	39.33 (999)
Average snowfall inches (cm)	0.1 (0.25)	0.9 (2.3)	0.3 (0.76)	0.0 (0.0)	0.0 (0.0)	0.0 (0.0)	0.0 (0.0)	0.0 (0.0)	0.0 (0.0)	0.0 (0.0)	0.1 (0.25)	0.3 (0.76)	1.7 (4.3)
Average precipitation days (≥ 0.01 in)	7.0	6.9	8.1	7.3	9.4	7.3	4.9	5.1	5.6	7.2	6.5	6.9	82.2
Average snowy days (≥ 0.1 in)	0.4	0.5	0.2	0.0	0.0	0.0	0.0	0.0	0.0	0.0	0.1	0.3	1.5
Average relative humidity (%)	67.5	66.4	63.7	65.3	69.7	65.8	60.0	60.5	66.5	65.7	67.4	67.5	65.4
Average dew point °F (°C)	31.3 (−0.4)	35.2 (1.8)	42.6 (5.9)	52.0 (11.1)	61.0 (16.1)	66.6 (19.2)	67.6 (19.8)	66.7 (19.3)	63.3 (17.4)	53.2 (11.8)	43.7 (6.5)	34.7 (1.5)	51.5 (10.8)
Mean monthly sunshine hours	183.5	178.3	227.7	236.0	258.4	297.8	332.4	304.5	246.2	228.1	183.8	173.0	2,849.7
Percentage possible sunshine	58	58	61	61	60	69	76	74	66	65	59	56	64
Average ultraviolet index	3	5	7	9	10	10	10	10	8	6	4	3	7
Source 1: NOAA (sun, relative humidity, and dew point 1961–1990 at DFW Airport) (Note: Sunshine normals are based on only 24 years of data.)
Source 2: Weather Atlas (Average UV index)

Climate data for Fort Worth, Texas
Month	Jan	Feb	Mar	Apr	May	Jun	Jul	Aug	Sep	Oct	Nov	Dec	Year
Record high °F (°C)	80 (27)	79 (26)	87 (31)	92 (33)	97 (36)	113 (45)	110 (43)	113 (45)	111 (44)	103 (39)	95 (35)	83 (28)	113 (45)
Mean daily maximum °F (°C)	54.1 (12.3)	60.1 (15.6)	68.3 (20.2)	75.9 (24.4)	83.2 (28.4)	91.1 (32.8)	95.4 (35.2)	94.8 (34.9)	87.7 (30.9)	77.9 (25.5)	65.1 (18.4)	56.5 (13.6)	75.8 (24.3)
Daily mean °F (°C)	44.1 (6.7)	49.4 (9.7)	57.4 (14.1)	65.0 (18.3)	73.1 (22.8)	80.9 (27.2)	85.0 (29.4)	84.4 (29.1)	77.5 (25.3)	67.2 (19.6)	55.1 (12.8)	46.7 (8.2)	65.5 (18.6)
Mean daily minimum °F (°C)	34.0 (1.1)	38.7 (3.7)	46.4 (8.0)	54.0 (12.2)	63.0 (17.2)	70.7 (21.5)	74.6 (23.7)	74.0 (23.3)	67.2 (19.6)	56.4 (13.6)	45.1 (7.3)	36.8 (2.7)	55.1 (12.8)
Record low °F (°C)	−7 (−22)	−8 (−22)	−2 (−19)	21 (−6)	32 (0)	43 (6)	52 (11)	59 (15)	31 (−1)	24 (−4)	−3 (−19)	−5 (−21)	−8 (−22)
Average precipitation inches (mm)	1.89 (48)	2.37 (60)	3.06 (78)	3.20 (81)	5.15 (131)	3.23 (82)	2.12 (54)	2.03 (52)	2.42 (61)	4.11 (104)	2.57 (65)	2.57 (65)	34.72 (882)
Average precipitation days	7.2	6.1	7.5	7.2	9.3	7.2	4.7	4.5	5.8	7.1	6.7	6.5	79.8
Mean monthly sunshine hours	186.0	169.5	217.0	240.0	248.0	300.0	341.0	310.0	240.0	217.0	180.0	186.0	2,834.5
Percentage possible sunshine	60	55	58	62	57	71	79	77	67	64	60	60	64
Average ultraviolet index	3	5	7	9	10	11	10	10	8	6	4	3	7
Source 1: National Climatic Data Center
Source 2: Weather Atlas (sunshine data, UV index)

== Principal communities ==
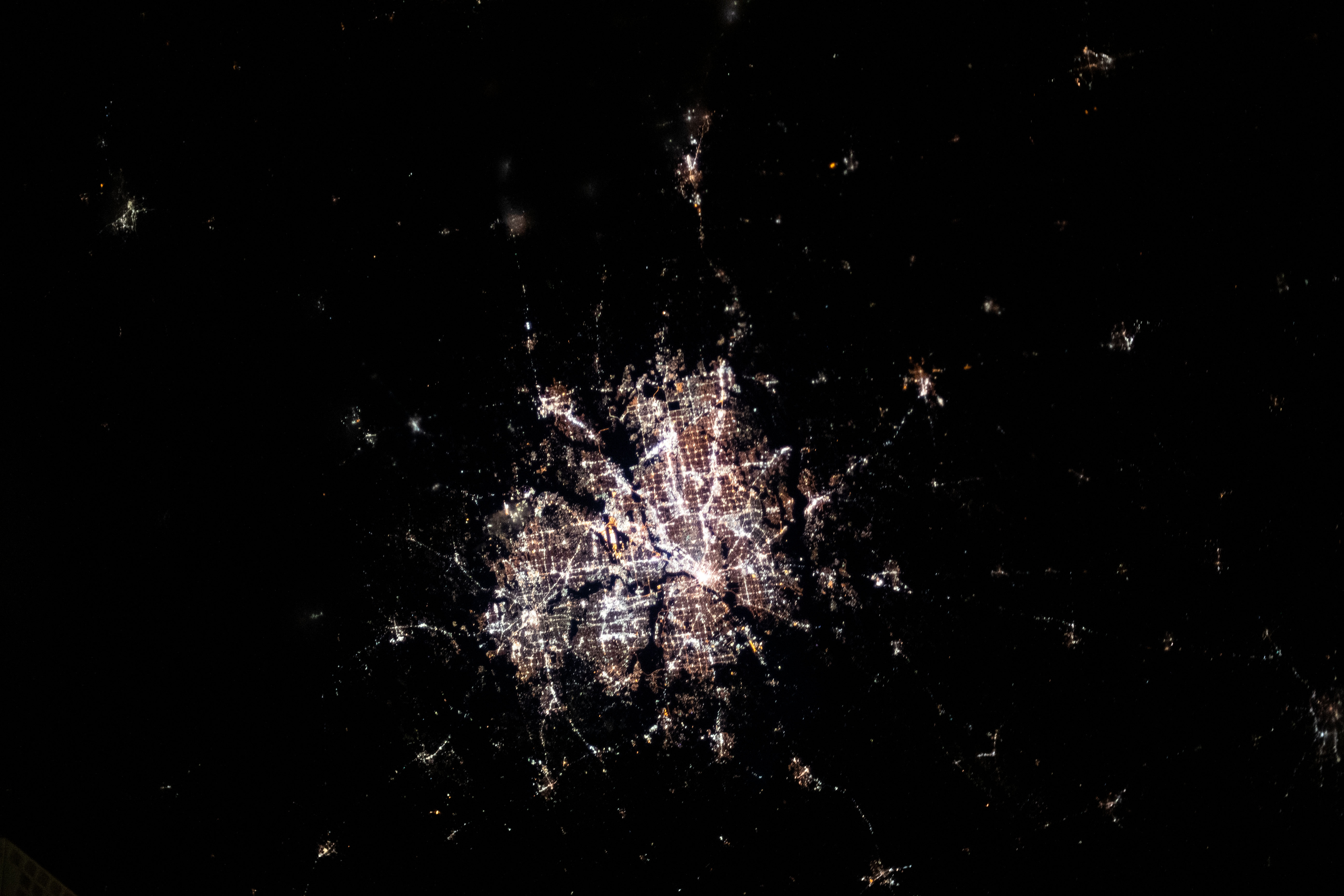
January 3, 2020: The International Space Station was orbiting 260 miles above central Texas when this nighttime photograph was taken of the Dallas–Fort Worth metropolitan area.

The following are cities and towns categorized based on the latest population estimates from the United States Census Bureau (as of July 1, 2025). No population estimates are released for census-designated places (CDPs), which are marked with an asterisk (*). These places are categorized based on their 2020 census population.

=== Places with more than 100,000 inhabitants ===
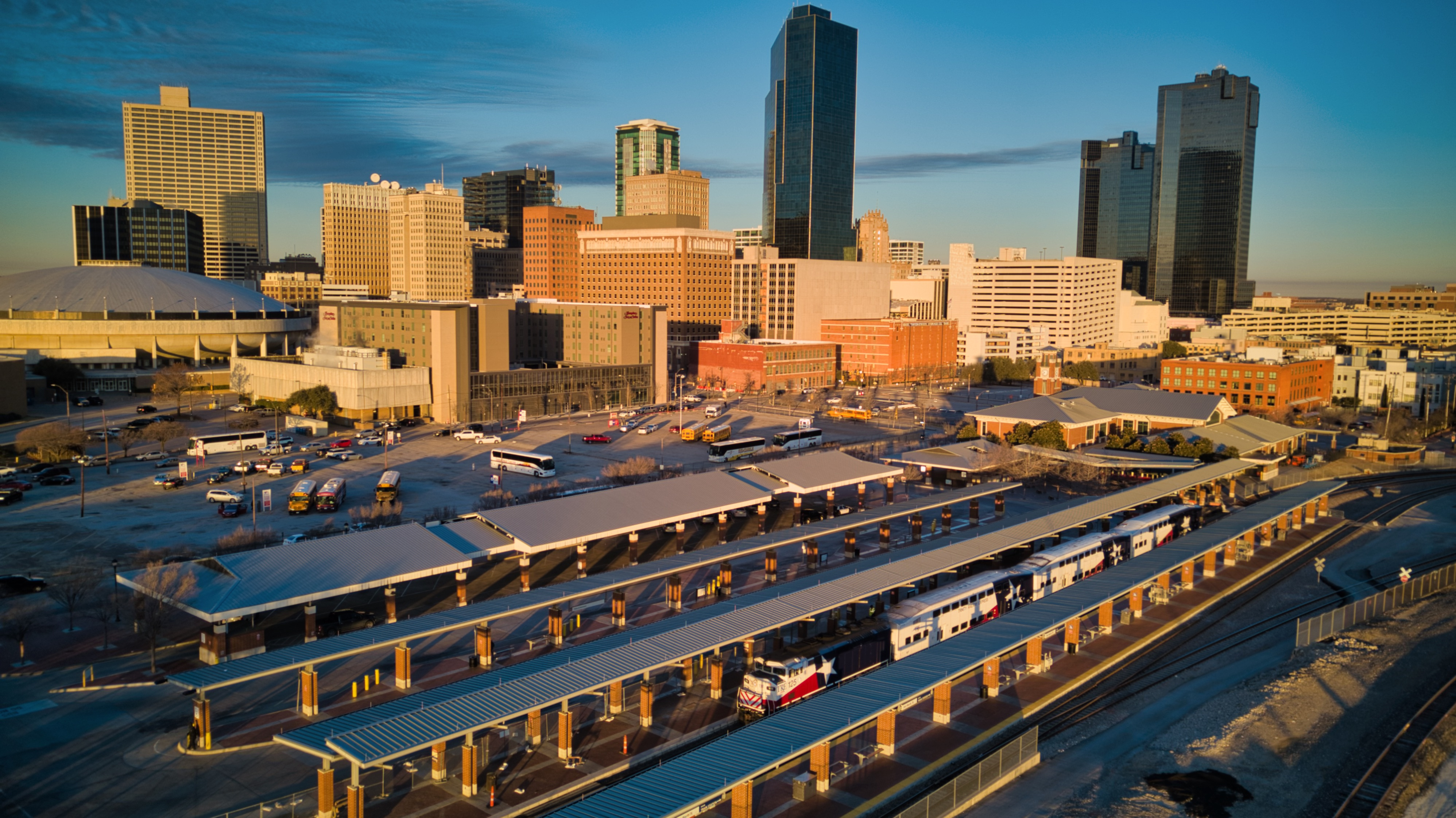
Downtown Fort Worth

Places designated "principal cities" by the U.S. Office of Management and Budget are italicized.

1,000,000+

- Dallas (1,329,491)
- Fort Worth (1,028,117)

200,000–499,999

- Arlington (402,134)
- Plano (293,028)
- Irving (257,076)
- Garland (249,625)
- Frisco (236,955)
- McKinney (236,001)
- Grand Prairie (209,434)

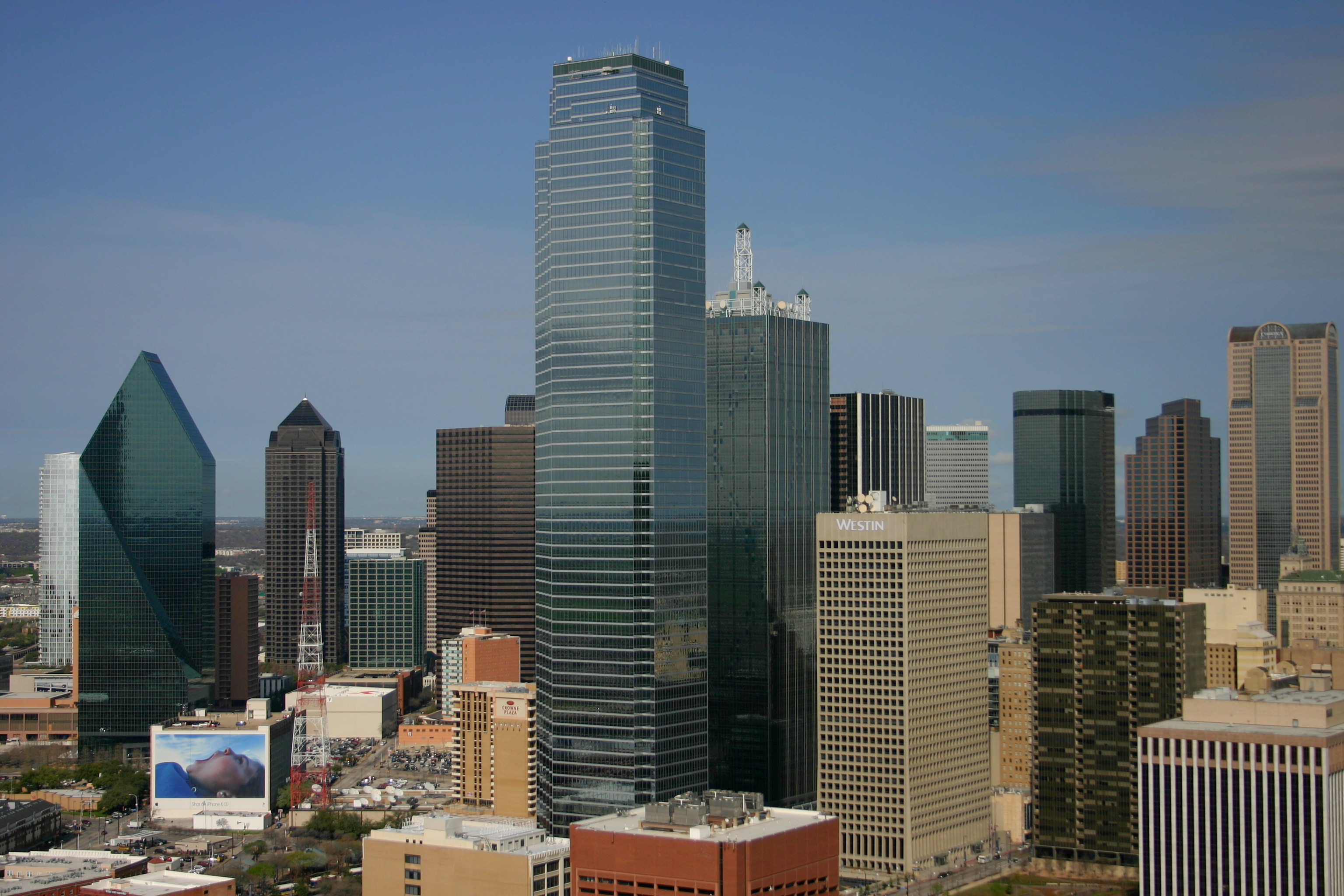
Downtown Dallas

100,000–199,999

- Denton (169,431)
- Mesquite (150,693)
- Lewisville (139,006)
- Carrollton (134,562)
- Richardson (118,542)
- Allen (113,447)

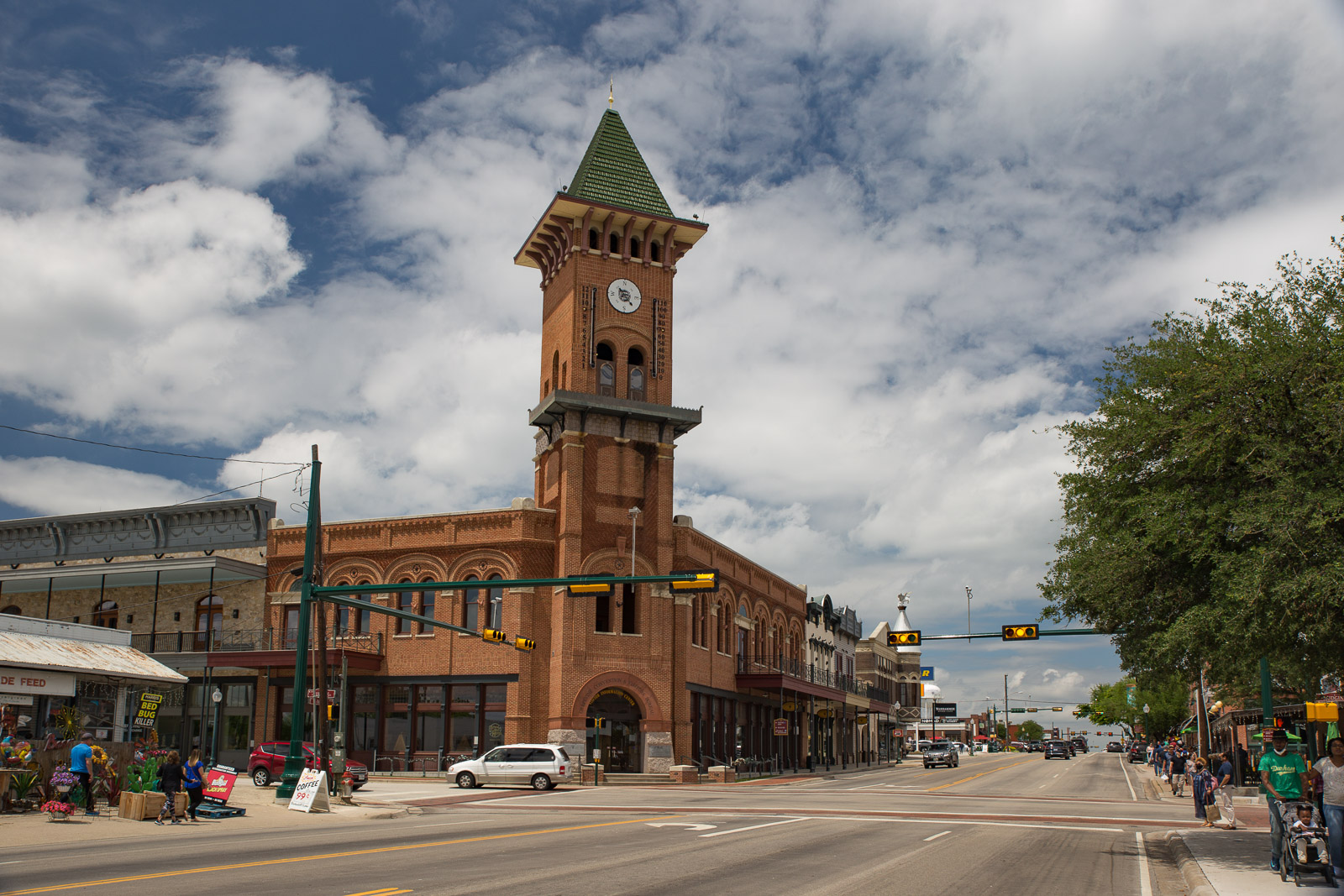
The historical downtown of Grapevine

=== Places with 10,000 to 99,999 inhabitants ===
- Addison
- Anna
- Azle
- Balch Springs
- Bedford
- Benbrook
- Burleson
- Cedar Hill
- Celina
- Cleburne
- Colleyville
- Coppell
- Corinth
- Crowley
- DeSoto
- Duncanville
- Ennis
- Euless
- Fairview
- Farmers Branch
- Fate
- Flower Mound
- Forest Hill
- Forney
- Glenn Heights
- Granbury
- Grapevine
- Greenville
- Haltom City
- Heath
- Highland Village
- Hurst
- Josephine
- Kaufman
- Keller
- Kennedale
- Lancaster
- Lavon
- Little Elm
- Mansfield
- Melissa
- Midlothian
- Mineral Wells (partial)
- Murphy
- North Richland Hills
- Northlake
- Princeton
- Prosper
- Providence Village
- Red Oak
- Rendon*
- Roanoke
- Rockwall
- Rowlett
- Royse City
- Sachse
- Saginaw
- Sanger
- Seagoville
- Southlake
- Terrell
- The Colony
- Trophy Club
- University Park
- Watauga
- Waxahachie
- Weatherford
- White Settlement
- Wylie

=== Places with fewer than 10,000 inhabitants ===
- Aledo
- Alma
- Alvarado
- Alvord
- Annetta North
- Annetta South
- Annetta
- Argyle
- Aubrey
- Aurora
- Bardwell
- Bartonville
- Blue Mound
- Blue Ridge
- Boyd
- Briar*
- Briaroaks
- Bridgeport
- Caddo Mills
- Campbell
- Celeste
- Chico
- Cockrell Hill
- Combine
- Commerce
- Cool
- Cooper
- Copper Canyon
- Corral City
- Cottonwood
- Covington
- Crandall
- Cresson (partial)
- Cross Roads
- Cross Timber
- Dalworthington Gardens
- Decatur
- DeCordova
- Dennis
- DISH
- Double Oak
- Eagle Mountain*
- Edgecliff Village
- Everman
- Farmersville
- Ferris
- Garrett
- Glen Rose
- Godley
- Grandview
- Grays Prairie
- Gun Barrel City
- Hackberry
- Haslet
- Hawk Cove
- Hebron
- Hickory Creek
- Highland Park
- Hudson Oaks
- Hutchins
- Italy
- Itasca
- Joshua
- Justin
- Keene
- Kemp
- Knollwood
- Krugerville
- Krum
- Lake Bridgeport
- Lake Dallas
- Lake Worth
- Lakeside
- Lakewood Village
- Leonard
- Lone Oak
- Lowry Crossing
- Lucas
- Mabank (partial)
- Maypearl
- McLendon-Chisholm
- Milford
- Millsap
- Mobile City
- Nevada
- New Fairview
- New Hope
- Newark
- Neylandville
- Oak Grove
- Oak Leaf
- Oak Point
- Oak Ridge
- Ovilla
- Palmer
- Pantego
- Paradise
- Parker
- Pecan Acres*
- Pecan Hill
- Pelican Bay
- Pilot Point
- Ponder
- Post Oak Bend
- Quinlan
- Reno
- Rhome
- Richland Hills
- Rio Vista
- River Oaks
- Rosser
- Runaway Bay
- Saint Paul
- Sanctuary
- Sansom Park
- Scurry
- Shady Shores
- Springtown
- Sunnyvale
- Talty
- Union Valley
- Van Alstyne (partial)
- Venus
- West Tawakoni
- Westlake
- Weston
- Westover Hills
- Westworth Village
- Willow Park
- Wilmer
- Wolfe City

=== Unincorporated places ===
- Ables Springs
- Acton
- Avalon
- Avondale
- Bolivar
- Brock
- Cash
- Copeville
- Elizabethtown
- Elmo
- Floyd
- Forreston
- Garner
- Greenwood
- Heartland
- Ike
- Lantana
- Lillian
- Merit
- Paloma Creek
- Peaster
- Poetry
- Poolville
- Rockett
- Sand Branch
- Savannah
- Slidell
- Telico
- Trumbull
- Westminster
- Whitt

== Demographics ==
Historical populations – Dallas–Fort Worth (1980–2020)
Census	Pop.	Note	%±
1980	2,974,805		—
1990	3,885,415		30.6%
2000	5,221,801		34.4%
2010	6,426,214		23.1%
2020	7,637,387		18.8%
2025 (est.)	8,477,157		11.0%
U.S. Decennial Census

County	2025 estimate	2020 census	Change	Area	Density
Dallas	2,661,397	2,613,539	+1.83%	873.19 sq mi (2,261.6 km^{2})	3,048/sq mi (1,177/km^{2})
Tarrant	2,248,466	2,110,640	+6.53%	865.40 sq mi (2,241.4 km^{2})	2,598/sq mi (1,003/km^{2})
Collin	1,297,179	1,064,465	+21.86%	841.51 sq mi (2,179.5 km^{2})	1,541/sq mi (595/km^{2})
Denton	1,069,346	906,422	+17.97%	878.76 sq mi (2,276.0 km^{2})	1,217/sq mi (470/km^{2})
Ellis	240,867	192,455	+25.15%	935.49 sq mi (2,422.9 km^{2})	257/sq mi (99/km^{2})
Johnson	218,048	179,927	+21.19%	725.06 sq mi (1,877.9 km^{2})	301/sq mi (116/km^{2})
Kaufman	209,235	145,310	+43.99%	780.71 sq mi (2,022.0 km^{2})	268/sq mi (103/km^{2})
Parker	184,767	148,222	+24.66%	903.74 sq mi (2,340.7 km^{2})	204/sq mi (79/km^{2})
Rockwall	140,738	107,819	+30.53%	127.23 sq mi (329.5 km^{2})	1,106/sq mi (427/km^{2})
Hunt	123,336	99,956	+23.39%	840.42 sq mi (2,176.7 km^{2})	147/sq mi (57/km^{2})
Wise	83,778	68,632	+22.07%	904.45 sq mi (2,342.5 km^{2})	93/sq mi (36/km^{2})
Total	8,477,157	7,637,387	+11.00%	8,676.27 sq mi (22,471.4 km^{2})	977/sq mi (377/km^{2})

Population density in the Dallas urban area

Numerically, the Metroplex is the fastest growing metropolitan area in the U.S. At the 2020 U.S. census 7,637,387 people lived in the area, up from 6,371,773 in 2010, and 2,974,805 in 1970. In 2020, the Dallas–Fort Worth metroplex's racial composition was 42% non-Hispanic white, 16% Black or African American, 8% Asian, 3–4% two or more races, and 29% Hispanic or Latino American of any race. According to information gathered from the North Texas Commission, the Metroplex's racial and ethnic makeup was 46% non-Hispanic white, 15% Black or African American, 7% Asian American, and 3% from other races in 2017. Ethnically, Hispanics and Latinos of any race made up 29% of the metropolitan population. From 2010 to 2017, Hispanics and Latinos increased an estimated 38.9% followed by Blacks and African Americans.

In 2015, an estimated 101,588 foreign-born residents moved to the Metroplex. Of the immigrant population, 44.1% were from Latin America, 35.8% Asia, 7.1% Europe, and 13.1% Africa. In 2010, 77,702 foreign nationals immigrated; approximately 50.6% came from Latin America, 33.0% from Asia, 7.3% Europe, and 9.1% Africa. During the 2020 American Community Survey, an estimated 18.5% of its population were foreign-born, with 56% from Latin America, 30% Asia, 8% Africa, 4% Europe, and 1% elsewhere from North America.

The median household income in Dallas–Fort Worth was higher than the state average in 2017, and its unemployment (3.6%) and poverty rate was lower. The median income for males was $52,492 and $44,207 for females. In 2019, the per capita income of DFW was $72,265. In 2010, the median income for a household in the metropolitan area was $48,062, and the median income for a family was $55,263. Males had a median income of $39,581 versus $27,446 for females. The per capita income for the Metroplex altogether was $21,839.

The Dallas–Fort Worth metroplex's religious population are predominantly Christian and the largest metro area that identify with the religion in the United States (78%). Methodist, Baptist, Presbyterian, and Catholic churches are prominent in many cities and towns in the metropolitan region. The Methodist and Baptist communities anchor two of the area's major private universities (Southern Methodist University and Dallas Baptist University). Non-Christian faiths including Islam, Judaism, Hinduism, Sikhism, Buddhism, and contemporary paganism collectively form a little over 4% of the religious population.

== Combined statistical area ==
The Dallas–Fort Worth, TX–OK combined statistical area is made up of 20 counties in North Central Texas and one county in South Central Oklahoma. The statistical area includes two metropolitan areas and seven micropolitan areas. The CSA definition encompasses 16,302 sq mi (42,220 km^{2}) of area, of which 15,800 sq mi (41,000 km^{2}) is land and 502 sq mi (1,300 km^{2}) is water. The population density was 485 people per square mile according to estimates from the U.S. Census Bureau.

=== Metropolitan statistical areas ===
- Dallas–Fort Worth–Arlington (Collin, Dallas, Denton, Ellis, Hunt, Johnson, Kaufman, Parker, Rockwall, Tarrant, and Wise counties)
- Sherman-Denison (Grayson County); population 143,131 (2022 estimate)

=== Micropolitan statistical areas ===
- Athens (Henderson County); population 84,511 (2022 estimate)
- Bonham (Fannin County) (delineated and added in 2015); population 37,125 (2022 estimate)
- Corsicana (Navarro County); population 54,636 (2022 estimate)
- Durant, OK (Bryan County, Oklahoma); population 48,182 (2022 estimate)
- Gainesville (Cooke County); population 43,050 (2022 estimate)
- Granbury (Hood County) (delineated and added in 2018); population 66,373 (2022 estimate)
- Mineral Wells (Palo Pinto County); population 29,239 (2022 estimate)
- Sulphur Springs (Hopkins County); population 37,793 (2022 estimate)

=== Demographics ===
At the 2000 U.S. census, there were 5,487,956 people, 2,006,665 households, and 1,392,540 families residing within the CSA. The racial makeup of the CSA was 70.41% White, 13.34% Black or African American, 0.59% Native American, 3.58% Asian, 0.08% Pacific Islander, 9.62% from other races, and 2.39% from two or more races. Hispanics or Latinos of any race were 20.83% of the population. The median income for a household in the CSA was $43,836, and the median income for a family was $50,898. Males had a median income of $37,002 versus $25,553 for females. The per capita income for the CSA was $20,460.

At the 2020 census, the DFW CSA had a population of 8,121,108 (though a July 1, 2015 estimate placed the population at 7,504,362). In 2018 it had an estimated 7,994,963 residents. The American Community Survey determined 18% of the population was foreign-born. The median household income was $67,589 and the per capita income was $34,455. An estimated 11.5% lived below the poverty line. The median age of the DFW CSA was 35.3.

=== Urban areas within ===
Urban areas within the Dallas–Fort Worth, TX–OK combined statistical area as of the 2020 census, according to the U.S. Census Bureau Urban areas Counties in the Dallas–Fort Worth MSA Counties in the Dallas–Fort Worth CSA but not the MSA

At the core of the Dallas–Fort Worth combined statistical area (CSA) lies the Dallas–Fort Worth–Arlington, TX urban area, the sixth-most populous in the United States. Within the boundaries of the CSA the Census Bureau defines 31 other urban areas as well, some of which form the core of their own metro or micro statistical areas separate from the Dallas–Fort Worth metropolitan statistical area. Urban areas situated primarily outside the Dallas–Fort Worth metropolitan statistical area but within the CSA are identified with a cross (†) in the table below.

Urban area	Population (2020 census)	Land area (sq mi)	Land area (km^{2})	Density (population / sq mi)	Density (population / km^{2})
Dallas–Fort Worth–Arlington, TX	5,732,354	1,746.90	4,524.44	3,281.45	1,266.98
McKinney–Frisco, TX	504,803	151.64	392.75	3,328.93	1,285.31
Denton–Lewisville, TX	429,461	150.48	389.74	2,853.94	1,101.91
Sherman–Denison, TX †	66,691	38.49	99.70	1,732.52	668.93
Weatherford, TX	48,112	38.69	100.20	1,243.60	480.16
Cleburne, TX	43,901	24.51	63.48	1,791.10	691.55
Forney, TX	41,112	19.68	50.97	2,089.25	806.66
Melissa–Anna, TX	34,516	16.95	43.89	2,036.73	786.39
Midlothian, TX	30,908	24.72	64.03	1,250.30	482.75
Granbury, TX †	29,706	21.87	56.63	1,358.53	524.53
Greenville, TX	27,054	17.30	44.81	1,563.59	603.70
Corsicana, TX †	24,380	15.52	40.20	1,570.65	606.43
Ennis, TX	19,763	12.42	32.16	1,591.54	614.50
Durant, OK †	19,324	12.01	31.10	1,609.52	621.44
Gun Barrel City, TX †	18,309	18.41	47.67	994.74	384.07
Princeton, TX	18,184	8.24	21.33	2,207.88	852.47
Terrell, TX	16,581	12.30	31.86	1,347.74	520.37
Gainesville, TX †	16,544	9.56	24.75	1,731.38	668.49
Mineral Wells, TX †	14,211	8.86	22.94	1,604.73	619.59
Denton Southwest, TX	14,105	7.06	18.29	1,997.20	771.12
Royse City, TX	13,922	6.13	15.89	2,269.52	876.27
Athens, TX †	12,050	9.32	24.14	1,292.92	499.20
Heartland, TX	9,841	2.77	7.17	3,556.92	1,373.33
Commerce, TX	8,320	3.34	8.66	2,489.33	961.14
Sanger, TX	8,279	4.39	11.37	1,885.57	728.02
Bonham, TX †	7,799	5.03	13.02	1,550.96	598.83
Pecan Plantation, TX †	6,831	8.12	21.04	841.04	324.73
Decatur, TX	6,486	6.20	16.05	1,046.54	404.07
Kaufman, TX	6,127	3.07	7.94	1,997.39	771.20
Krum, TX	5,876	3.27	8.47	1,796.71	693.71
Aubrey, TX	5,116	2.74	7.10	1,867.03	720.86
Alvarado, TX	5,034	3.04	7.88	1,653.89	638.57

== Economy ==
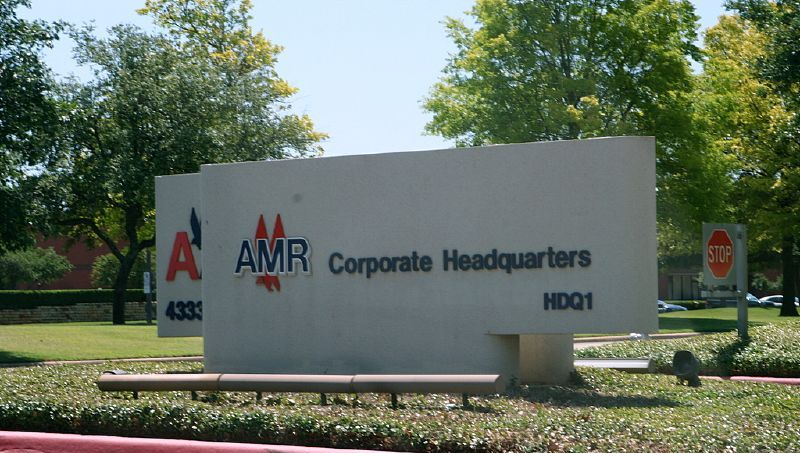
Headquarters of AMR Corporation and American Airlines

The cities of Dallas and Fort Worth are the two central cities of the Metroplex, with Arlington being a third economically important city; it is a center for sporting events, tourism and manufacturing. Most other incorporated cities in the Metroplex are "bedroom communities" serving largely as residential and small-business centers, though there are several key employers in these regions. Due to the large number of smaller, less well-known cities, Metroplex residents commonly divide the region roughly in half along Texas Interstate 35, which runs north–south, splitting into two 'branches' (I-35E in Dallas and I-35W in Fort Worth) through the Metroplex. They refer to places as being on the "Dallas side" or the "Fort Worth side", or in "the Arlington area", which is almost directly south of the airport; cities in the Arlington area form the Mid-Cities. It is nominally between the two major east–west interstates in the region (I-20, passing to the south of both downtowns, and I-30, connecting Dallas and Fort Worth city centers).

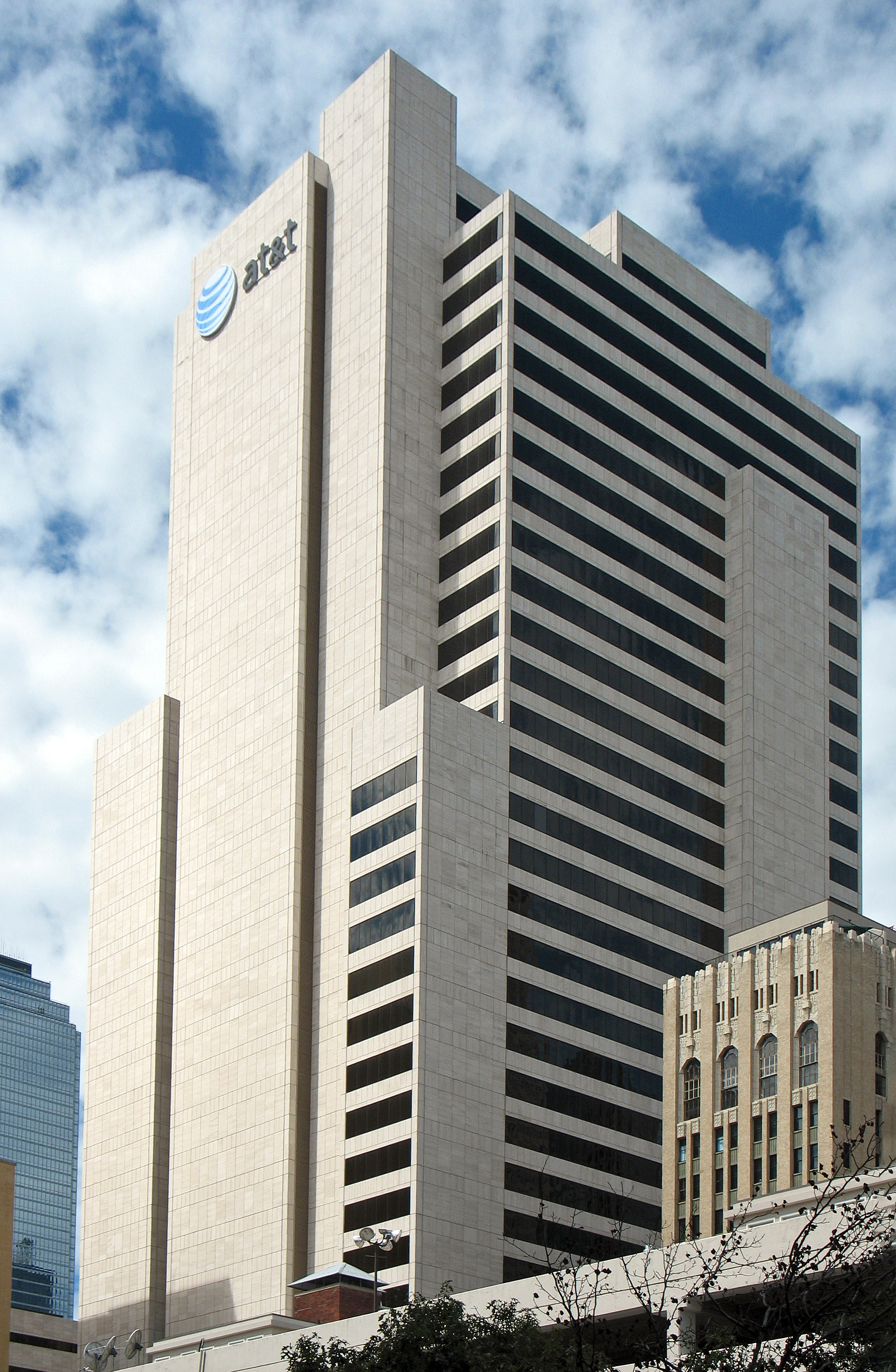
AT&T headquarters in Dallas

Business management and operations play a central role in the area's economy. Dallas and its suburbs have the third-largest concentration of corporate headquarters in the United States. The area continues to draw corporate relocation from across the nation, and especially from the Midwest and the Northeast. From late 2018 to early 2019, both McKesson and Charles Schwab announced they would be relocating from San Francisco to the Dallas/Fort Worth area. Later in 2019, San Francisco-based Uber announced a massive corporate expansion just east of Downtown Dallas.

Banking and finance play a key role in the area's economy. Dallas/Fort Worth recently surpassed Chicago to become the second-largest financial services hub in the nation, eclipsed only by New York. Bank of America, JPMorgan Chase, Liberty Mutual, Goldman Sachs, State Farm, Charles Schwab Corporation, and Fidelity Investments maintain significant operations in the area. The Metroplex also contains the largest Information Technology industry base in the state (often referred to as Silicon Prairie or the Telecom Corridor, especially when referring to US 75 through Richardson, Plano and Allen just north of Dallas itself). This area has a large number of corporate IT projects and the presence of numerous electronics, computing and telecommunication firms such as Microsoft, Texas Instruments, HP Enterprise Services, Dell Services, Samsung, Nokia, Cisco, Fujitsu, i2, Frontier, Alcatel, Ericsson, CA, Google, T-Mobile US, and Verizon. AT&T, the second largest telecommunications company in the world, is headquartered at the Whitacre Tower in Downtown Dallas. McKesson the 9th largest Fortune 500 company by revenue is headquartered in Irving. Fluor, the largest engineering & construction company in the Fortune 500, is also headquartered in Irving. In October 2016, Jacobs Engineering, a Fortune 500 company and one of the world's largest engineering companies, relocated from Pasadena, California to Dallas. Toyota USA, in 2016, relocated its corporate headquarters to Plano. Southwest Airlines is headquartered in Dallas. The airline has more than 53,000 employees as of October 2016 and operates more than 3,900 departures a day during peak travel season.

On the other side of the Metroplex, the Texas farming and ranching industry is based in Fort Worth, though the area's economy is diverse. American Airlines, the largest airline in the world, recently completed their new $350M corporate HQ complex in Fort Worth. American Airlines is also the largest employer in the Metroplex. Several major defense manufacturers, including Lockheed Martin, Bell Helicopter Textron, and Raytheon, maintain significant operations in the Metroplex, primarily on the "Fort Worth side". They are concentrated along SH 170 near I-35W, commonly called the "Alliance Corridor" due to its proximity to the Fort Worth Alliance regional airport.

Changes in house prices for the Metroplex are publicly tracked on a regular basis using the Case–Shiller index; the statistic is published by Standard & Poor's and is also a component of S&P's 20-city composite index of the value of the U.S. residential real estate market.

== Sports ==
The Metroplex is one of the 12 U.S. metropolitan areas that has a team in each of the four major professional sports leagues. Major professional sports first came to the area in 1952, when the Dallas Texans competed in the NFL for one season. In 1960, major professional sports returned when the Dallas Cowboys began competing in the National Football League and the Dallas Texans began competing in the American Football League. The Dallas Texans later relocated to Kansas City and became the Chiefs. In 1972, MLB's Washington Senators moved to Arlington to become the Texas Rangers, named after the statewide law enforcement agency. The National Basketball Association expanded into North Texas in 1980 when the Dallas Mavericks were added to the league. The fourth sport was added in 1993 when the Minnesota North Stars of the National Hockey League moved to Dallas, becoming the Dallas Stars.

The MLS team FC Dallas is based in Frisco, and the Dallas Wings of the WNBA play in Arlington. The area is also home to many minor-league professional teams, and four colleges that compete in NCAA Division I athletics. A NASCAR Cup Series race is hosted annually at Texas Motor Speedway, the AAA Texas 500, and two PGA Tour events are held annually in the Metroplex, the AT&T Byron Nelson and the Colonial National Invitation Tournament. The Metroplex has hosted many premiere sports events on both an annual and one-time basis.

=== Major professional sports teams ===
Club	Sport	Founded	League	Venue	City
Dallas Cowboys	American Football	1960	NFL	AT&T Stadium	Arlington, Texas
Texas Rangers	Baseball	1972^	MLB	Globe Life Field	Arlington, Texas
Dallas Mavericks	Basketball	1980	NBA	American Airlines Center	Dallas, Texas
Dallas Stars	Ice Hockey	1993^	NHL	American Airlines Center	Dallas, Texas
FC Dallas	Soccer	1996	MLS	Toyota Stadium	Frisco, Texas
Texas Super Kings	Cricket	2023	MLC	Grand Prairie Stadium	Grand Prairie, Texas
Dallas Renegades	American football	2020	UFL	Toyota Stadium	Frisco, Texas
Atlético Dallas	Soccer	2025	USLC	Cotton Bowl	Dallas, Texas
Dallas Trinity FC	Soccer	2023	USLSL	Cotton Bowl	Dallas, Texas
Dallas Wings	Basketball	2015^	WNBA	College Park Center	Arlington, Texas
Dallas Pulse	Volleyball	2023	MLV	Comerica Center	Frisco, Texas

^- Indicates year team relocated to the area

=== Other notable professional and amateur teams ===
Club	Sport	Founded	League	Venue	City
Frisco RoughRiders	Baseball	2003^	Texas League	Riders Field	Frisco, Texas
Cleburne Railroaders	Baseball	2017	AAIPBL	La Moderna Field	Cleburne, Texas
Texas Legends	Basketball	2010^	NBA G League	Comerica Center	Frisco, Texas
Dallas Mustangs	Cricket	2020	MiLC	Grand Prairie Stadium	Grand Prairie, Texas
Dallas Xforia Giants	Cricket	2023	MiLC	Grand Prairie Stadium	Grand Prairie, Texas
OpTic Texas	esports	2021	Call of Duty League	Various	Various
Allen Americans	Ice hockey	2009	ECHL	Credit Union of Texas Event Center	Allen, Texas
Lone Star Brahmas	Ice hockey	1999	NAHL	NYTEX Sports Centre	North Richland Hills, Texas
Mid-Cities Junior Stars	Ice hockey	2013	NA3HL	Children's Health StarCenter Euless	Euless, Texas
Texas Jr. Brahmas	Ice hockey	2014	NA3HL	NYTEX Sports Centre	North Richland Hills
Frisco Fighters	Indoor football	2020	Indoor Football League	Comerica Center	Frisco, Texas
North Texas SC	Soccer	2018	MLS Next Pro	Choctaw Stadium	Arlington, Texas
Dallas City FC	Soccer	2013	NPSL	DCFC McKinney Soccer Complex	McKinney, Texas
Fort Worth Vaqueros FC	Soccer	2014	NPSL	W.O. Barnes stadium	Fort Worth, Texas
Texas United	Soccer	2017	USL2	John Clark Stadium	Plano, Texas
FC Dallas	Soccer	1996	Women's Premier Soccer League	Toyota Stadium	Frisco, Texas
FC Dallas U-23	Soccer	1996	Women's Premier Soccer League	Toyota Soccer Complex	Frisco, Texas
Dallas Elite	Women's American football	2015	Women's Football Alliance	Prestonwood Christian Academy	Plano, Texas
Dallas Team Handball Club	Handball	2009	USA Team Handball Nationals	Mustang Park Recreation Center	Irving, Texas
Mansfield Barracudas	Ice hockey	2019	Mountain Hockey League	Children's Health StarCenter Mansfield	Mansfield, Texas
Texas Rattlers	Bull riding	2022	Professional Bull Riders	Ariat Arena	Fort Worth, Texas
Texas Elite Spartans	Women’s American football	2018	WNFC	Maverick Stadium	Arlington, Texas
Texas Scorpions	Ice hockey	2026	Colonial Hockey League	Children's Health StarCenter Northlake	Northlake, Texas

^- Indicates year team relocated to the area

=== Division I college athletics ===
School	City	Mascot	Conference
University of Texas at Arlington	Arlington	Mavericks	Western Athletic Conference
University of North Texas	Denton	Mean Green	American Athletic Conference
Southern Methodist University	University Park	Mustangs	Atlantic Coast Conference
Texas Christian University	Fort Worth	Horned Frogs	Big 12 Conference
East Texas A&M	Commerce	Lions	Southland Conference
Dallas Baptist University	Dallas	Patriots	C-USA (baseball only)

The headquarters for both the Big 12 and American Athletic Conference are located in Irving, Conference USA headquarters are in Dallas, the Southland Conference headquarters are in Frisco, and the Western Athletic Conference is headquartered in Arlington.

=== Sports events hosted ===
Note: Venues are listed with their current names, not necessarily those in use when an event took place.

Event	Sport	Year(s)	Venue
Red River Showdown	College football	1912–present	Cotton Bowl
Battle for the Iron Skillet	College football	1915–present	Cotton Bowl, Amon G. Carter Stadium, Ownby Stadium, Texas Stadium, Ford Stadium
Fort Worth Classic	College football	1921	Panther Park
Dixie Classic	College football	1922, 1925, 1934	Fair Park Stadium
State Fair Classic	College football	1925–present	Cotton Bowl
PGA Championship	Golf	1927, 1963, 2027	Cedarcrest Golf Course, Dallas Athletic Club, PGA Frisco
AT&T Cotton Bowl Classic	College football	1937–present	Cotton Bowl, AT&T Stadium
U.S. Open	Golf	1941, 1952	Colonial Country Club, Northwood Club
Byron Nelson Golf Classic	Golf	1944–present	Multiple courses in Dallas
Colonial National Invitational	Golf	1946–present	Colonial Country Club
Pro Bowl	Football	1973	Texas Stadium
The Players Championship	Golf	1975	Colonial Country Club
Dallas Grand Prix	Auto racing	1984–1996	Fair Park, Addison, Reunion Arena
NBA All-Star Game	Basketball	1986, 2010	Reunion Arena, AT&T Stadium
NCAA Men's Final Four	Basketball	1986, 2014	Reunion Arena, AT&T Stadium
U.S. Women's Open	Golf	1991	Colonial Country Club
FIFA World Cup Preliminaries	Soccer	1994	Cotton Bowl
Major League Baseball All-Star Game	Baseball	1995, 2024	Globe Life Park in Arlington, Globe Life Field
Duck Commander 500	Auto racing	1997–2020	Texas Motor Speedway
Bombardier Learjet 550	Auto racing	1997–present	Texas Motor Speedway
Big 12 Championship Game	College football	2001, 2009, 2010, 2017–present	Texas Stadium, AT&T Stadium
Bell Helicopter Armed Forces Bowl	College Football	2003–present	Amon G. Carter Stadium
Breeders' Cup	Horse racing	2004	Lone Star Park
Autotrader EchoPark Automotive 400	Auto racing	2005–present	Texas Motor Speedway
MLS Cup	Soccer	2005, 2006	Toyota Stadium
NHL All-Star Game	Hockey	2007	American Airlines Center
CONCACAF Gold Cup	Soccer	2009, 2011, 2013, 2015	AT&T Stadium, Toyota Stadium
Cowboys Classic	College football	2009–2021	AT&T Stadium
Southwest Classic	College football	2009–2011, 2014–2019, 2021–present	AT&T Stadium
First Responder Bowl	College football	2010–present	Gerald J. Ford Stadium
Manny Pacquiao vs. Antonio Margarito	Boxing	November 13, 2010	AT&T Stadium
NCAA Division I Football Championship	College football	2011–2014	Toyota Stadium
Super Bowl XLV	Football	2011	AT&T Stadium
College Football Playoff National Championship	College football	2015	AT&T Stadium
WrestleMania 32	Wrestling	2016	AT&T Stadium
NCAA Women's Final Four	Basketball	2017, 2023	American Airlines Center
Frisco Bowl	College football	2017–present	Toyota Stadium
NFL draft	Football	2018	AT&T Stadium
NHL entry draft	Hockey	2018	American Airlines Center
NHL Winter Classic	Hockey	2020	Cotton Bowl
2021 Frisco Football Classic	College football	2021	Toyota Stadium
All In Texas	Wrestling	2025	Globe Life Field
FIFA World Cup	Soccer	1994, 2026	Cotton Bowl, AT&T Stadium

== Education ==
=== Notable colleges and universities ===
Public universities
School	Enrollment	Location	Mascot	Athletic affiliation (conference)	University system
University of North Texas	46,940	Denton	Mean Green	NCAA Division I FBS (American Athletic Conference)	University of North Texas System
University of Texas at Arlington	42,496	Arlington	Mavericks	NCAA Division I (WAC); Non–football	University of Texas System
University of Texas at Dallas	31,570	Richardson	Comets	NCAA Division III (American Southwest); Non–football	University of Texas System
Texas Woman's University	15,472	Denton	Pioneers	NCAA Division II (Lone Star); Women's sports only	Independent
East Texas A&M University	12,385	Commerce	Lions	NCAA Division I FCS (Southland)	Texas A&M University System
University of North Texas at Dallas	3,030	Dallas	Trailblazers	NAIA (Sooner); Non–football	University of North Texas System
UT Southwestern	2,235	Dallas	N/A	N/A	University of Texas System

Private universities
School	Enrollment	Location	Mascot	Athletic affiliation (conference)
Southern Methodist University	11,643	University Park	Mustangs	NCAA Division I FBS (Atlantic Coast Conference)
Texas Christian University	10,394	Fort Worth	Horned Frogs	NCAA Division I FBS (Big 12)
Dallas Baptist University	5,445	Dallas	Patriots	NCAA Division II (Lone Star); Non–football, compete in the Missouri Valley Conference at the Division I level for baseball
Texas Wesleyan University	3,378	Fort Worth	Rams	NAIA (Sooner)
University of Dallas	2,387	Irving	Crusaders	NCAA Division III (SCAC); Non–football, compete in Texas Rugby Union at the Division II level for rugby
Nelson University	2,012	Waxahachie	Lions	NAIA NCCAA (Sooner and Central States Football League)
Paul Quinn College	600	Dallas	Tigers	NAIA (Red River); Non–football

== Politics ==
Presidential election results in Dallas–Fort Worth–Arlington MSA
Year	Republican	Democratic
2024	52.2% 1,635,723	45.8% 1,435,750
2020	48.5% 1,495,550	49.8% 1,535,525
2016	50.7% 1,218,897	44.4% 1,066,312
2012	56.4% 1,205,855	42.2% 900,749
2008	54.6% 1,188,570	44.6% 969,541
2004	61.5% 1,188,915	37.9% 732,160
2000	60.8% 971,927	36.7% 587,163

2024 presidential election in DFW metroplex

The Dallas–Fort Worth metroplex is more competitive between the Democratic and Republican parties than other sprawling metropolitan areas, which tend to be safely Democratic. The area was historically Republican-leaning until around 2016, when Democrats began noticeably making inroads in the area's suburbs. As of 2024, both the mayor of Dallas (elected as a Democrat) and the mayor of Fort Worth are Republicans, with Dallas being the largest city in the United States to have a Republican mayor.

The Republican Party has historically been dominant in the Dallas–Fort Worth area, including in presidential elections. Democrats have consistently won Dallas County since 2008. In 2020, Joe Biden narrowly won Tarrant County, whose county seat is Fort Worth, marking the first time since 1964 that the Democratic candidate had carried the county.

In 2026, the Metroplex voted for statewide Democrats by fairly large margins. James Talarico, the Democratic U.S. Senate candidate, won the Metroplex by more than 17 percentage points. He received 1.61 million votes (57.74%) from the 11 counties combined; Ken Paxton, the Republican in the race, got 1.13 million (40.36%). In the concurrent gubernatorial election, Democrat Gina Hinojosa carried the Metroplex with 1.54 million votes (54.98%), a nearly 12% lead over incumbent Republican Greg Abbott's 1.21 million (43.38%).

== Mass media ==
The cities of Dallas and Fort Worth have their own newspapers, The Dallas Morning News and the Fort Worth Star-Telegram, respectively. Historically, the two papers had readership primarily in their own counties. As the two cities' suburbs have grown together in recent years (and especially since the demise of the Dallas Times Herald in 1991), many sites sell both papers. This pattern of crossover has been repeated in other print media, radio, and television.

Since the 1970s all of the television stations and most of the FM radio stations have chosen to transmit from Cedar Hill so as to serve the entire market, and are programmed likewise. There has been a rise in "80–90 move-ins", whereby stations have been moved from distant markets, in some cases as far away as Oklahoma, and relicensed to anonymous small towns in the Metroplex to serve as additional DFW stations. According to RadioTime, the market had 38 AM stations, 58 FM stations (many of them class Cs), and 18 full-power television stations. Per another study the area has a total of 62 FM stations and 40 AM stations as of 2020.

Dallas–Fort Worth is the fifth-largest television market in the United States, behind only New York City, Los Angeles, Chicago, and Philadelphia. Two of the Metroplex's AM radio stations, WBAP and KRLD, are 50,000-watt stations with coverage of much of the North American continent and beyond during nighttime hours. The South Asian population (Indian Sub-continent) has increased considerably in the DFW metroplex. They have the FM 104.9 radio channel and 700 AM radio. Recently Sony TV, a subsidiary of Sony TV Asia, launched its FTA (free to Air OTA) channel on 44.2 station in DFW. It was one of the two locations they chose in the United States, the other being New York City, where there is also a large South Asian demographic.

=== Television ===
The following are television stations serving the Dallas–Fort Worth television market. Two asterisks (**) denote a network owned-and-operated station.

==== Full-power ====
- 2 KDTN Denton (Daystar)**
- 4 KDFW Dallas (Fox)**
- 5 KXAS-TV Fort Worth (NBC)**
- 8 WFAA Dallas (ABC)
- 11 KTVT Fort Worth (CBS)**
- 13 KERA-TV Dallas (PBS)
- 21 KTXA Fort Worth (Independent)
- 23 KUVN-DT Garland (Univision)**
- 27 KDFI Dallas (MyNetworkTV)**
- 29 KFAA-TV Decatur (Independent and Estrella TV)
- 33 KDAF Dallas (The CW)**
- 39 KXTX-TV Dallas (Telemundo)**
- 47 KTXD-TV Greenville (Merit Street Media)
- 49 KSTR-DT Irving (UniMás)**
- 52 KFWD Fort Worth (ShopHQ)
- 55 KAZD Lake Dallas (WEST and MeTV)**
- 58 KDTX-TV Dallas (TBN)**
- 68 KPXD-TV Arlington (Ion Television)**

==== Low-power ====
- 18 KPFW-LD Dallas (Hope Channel)
- 20 KBOP-LD Dallas (Infomercial)
- 22 KNAV-LD Dallas (Hot TV Network)
- 25 K07AAF-D Corsicana (HSN)**
- 26 KODF-LD Britton (Guide US TV)
- 28 KHPK-LD DeSoto (SonLife)
- 31 K07AAD-D Fort Worth (SonLife)
- 34 KJJM-LD Dallas & Mesquite (HSN)
- 44 KLEG-CD Dallas (TVC+Latino)
- 46 KUVN-CD Garland (Univision)**
- 51 KHFD-LD Cedar Hill (The Walk TV)

=== Radio stations ===
The following are radio stations serving the Dallas—Fort Worth Metroplex.

==== AM ====
- 540 KDFT Ferris (Religious)
- 570 KLIF Dallas (Conservative talk)
- 660 KSKY Balch Springs (Conservative talk)
- 700 KHSE Wylie (South Asian)
- 730 KKDA Grand Prairie (Korean/full-service)
- 770 KCBI Garland (Brokered/Christian)
- 820 WBAP Fort Worth (Talk radio)
- 850 KJON Carrollton (Spanish/Catholic)
- 870 KFJZ Fort Worth (Business news)
- 890 KTXV Mabank (Punjabi/full-service)
- 910 KATH Frisco (Catholic/Guadalupe Radio/EWTN)
- 970 KHVN Fort Worth (Black Information Network)
- 990 KFCD Farmersville (Brokered/Spanish Christian)
- 1040 KGGR Dallas (Urban gospel)
- 1080 KRLD Dallas (Talk radio)
- 1110 KVTT Mineral Wells (South Asian)
- 1140 KHFX Cleburne (Spanish/Christian)
- 1160 KBDT Highland Park (Vietnamese/full-service)
- 1190 KFXR Dallas (Conservative talk)
- 1220 KZEE Weatherford (Brokered/South Asian)
- 1270 KFLC Benbrook (Spanish/Sports)
- 1310 KTCK Dallas (Sports)
- 1340 KAND Corsicana (Country)
- 1360 KMNY Hurst (Spanish Christian)
- 1390 KBEC Waxahachie (Texas country)
- 1420 KPIR Granbury (Classic country)
- 1440 KEXB University Park (Catholic/Relevant Radio)
- 1460 KCLE Cleburne (Vietnamese)
- 1480 KNGO Dallas (Vietnamese/full-service)
- 1540 KAMM University Park (Indie rock)
- 1570 KPYK Terrell (Adult standards)
- 1600 KRVA Cockrell Hill (Vietnamese)
- 1630 KKGM Fort Worth (Black Information Network)
- 1700 KTNO Richardson (Tejano)

==== FM ====
- 88.1 KNTU McKinney (College/Alternative/University of North Texas)
- 88.3 KJRN Keene (Christian adult contemporary)
- 88.5 KEOM Mesquite (Classic hits/Community/Mesquite Independent School District)
- 88.7 KTCU-FM Fort Worth (College/Texas Christian University)
- 89.1 KSQX Springtown (Christian radio)
- 89.3 KNON Dallas (Community, Variety)
- 89.5 KYQX Weatherford (Classic country)
- 89.7 KAWA Sanger (Christian contemporary/WayFM)
- 90.1 KERA Dallas (Public radio/NPR)
- 90.5 KTXG Greenville (Christian/AFR)
- 90.9 KCBI-FM Dallas (Christian)
- 91.3 KDKR Decatur (Christian)
- 91.7 KKXT Dallas (Public/AAA)
- 92.1 KXEZ Farmersville (Classic country)
- 92.5 KZPS Dallas (Classic rock)
- 93.3 WBAP-FM Haltom City (Talk radio)
- 93.7 KNOR Krum (Regional Mexican)
- 94.1 KLNO Fort Worth (Regional Mexican)
- 94.5 KFZN Gainesville (Spanish Christian)
- 94.9 KLTY Arlington (Christian contemporary/K-Love)
- 95.3 KHYI Howe (Country/Americana)
- 95.9 KFWR Jacksboro (Texas country)
- 96.3 KSCS Fort Worth (Country)
- 96.7 KTCK-FM Flower Mound (Sports radio)
- 97.1 KEGL Fort Worth (Mainstream rock)
- 97.5 KLAK Tom Bean (Adult contemporary)
- 97.9 KBFB Dallas (Rhythmic contemporary)
- 98.3 KBOC Brideport (Spanish adult contemporary)
- 98.7 KSPF Dallas (Classic hits)
- 99.1 KFZO Denton (Regional Mexican)
- 99.5 KPLX Fort Worth (Country)
- 100.3 KJKK Dallas (Adult hits)
- 100.7 KWRD-FM Highland Village (Christian)
- 101.1 WRR Dallas (Classical music)
- 101.7 KYDA Azle (Christian worship/Air1)
- 102.1 KDGE Fort Worth & Dallas (Adult Contemporary)
- 102.9 KDMX Dallas (Hot adult contemporary)
- 103.3 KVDT Allen (Christian/VCY America)
- 103.7 KVIL Highland Park (Alternative rock)
- 104.1 KTCG Sanger (South Asian)
- 104.5 KKDA-FM Dallas (Urban contemporary)
- 104.9 KZMP-FM Pilot Point (South Asian)
- 105.3 KRLD-FM Dallas (Sports)
- 105.7 KRNB Decatur (Urban adult contemporary)
- 106.1 KHKS Denton (Contemporary hits)
- 107.1 KESS-FM Benbrook (Contemporary hits/Latin pop)
- 107.5 KMVK Fort Worth (Regional Mexican)
- 107.9 KDXX Lewisville (Contemporary hits/Latin pop)

== Transportation ==
=== Air travel ===
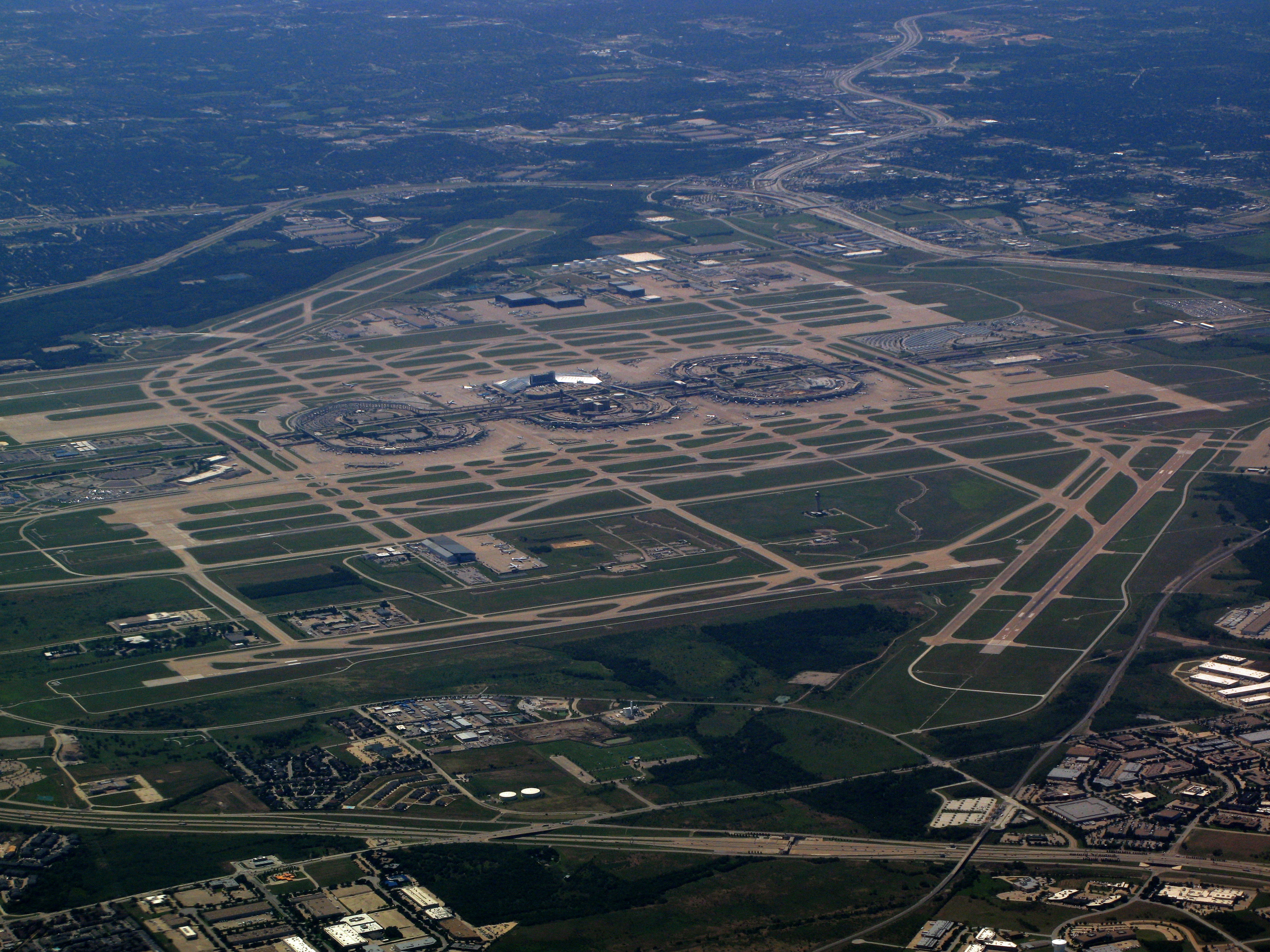
Dallas Fort Worth International Airport

Dallas Fort Worth International Airport (IATA airport code: DFW), located between the cities of Dallas and Fort Worth, is the largest and busiest airport in the state of Texas. At 17,207 acres (6,963 ha) of total land area, DFW is also the second-largest airport in the country and the sixth-largest in the world. It is the third-busiest airport in the world in terms of aircraft movements and the world's seventh-busiest by passenger traffic, transporting 62.9 million passengers in FY 2014. Based in Fort Worth, American Airlines' headquarters are adjacent to DFW. Recently having regained the title as the largest airline in the world in terms of both passengers transported and fleet size, American is a predominant leader in domestic routes and operations.

Dallas Love Field Airport (IATA airport code: DAL) is located in Northwest Dallas. Based in Dallas, Southwest Airlines is headquartered next to Love Field.

Beginning in fall 2026, McKinney National Airport will begin hosting a crew base for Avelo Airlines, thus becoming the Metroplex's third commercial airport.

=== Freeways ===
DFW freeway map

The Dallas–Fort Worth area has thousands of lane-miles of freeways and interstates. The Metroplex has the second-largest number of freeway-miles per capita in the nation, behind only the Kansas City Metro Area. As in most major metropolitan areas in Texas, most interstates and freeways have access or frontage roads where most of the businesses are located; these access roads have slip ramps allowing traffic to transition between the freeway and access road. North–south interstates include I-35 and I-45. East–west routes include I-30 and I-20. I-35 splits into I-35E and I-35W from Denton to Hillsboro: I-35W goes through Fort Worth while I-35E goes through Dallas. (This is one of only two examples of an interstate splitting off into branches and then rejoining as one; the other such split is in Minneapolis-St. Paul where I-35E goes into St. Paul and I-35W goes through Minneapolis.) I-30 connects Dallas and Fort Worth, and I-45 connects Dallas to Houston. The "multiple-of-5" numbers used for the interstate designations are notable, as these numbers were designed to be used for major multi-state arteries of the U.S. Interstate Highway System. The North Texas region is the terminus for two of them, and I-45 is located only within Texas.

HOV lanes exist along I-35E, I-30, I-635, US 67, and US 75. I-20 bypasses both Dallas and Fort Worth to the south while its loop, I-820, goes around Fort Worth. I-635 splits to the north of I-20 and loops around east and North Dallas, ending at SH 121 north of DFW Airport. I-35E, Loop 12, and Spur 408 ultimately connect to I-20 southwest of Dallas, completing the west bypass loop around Dallas. A large number of construction projects are planned or are already underway in the region to alleviate congestion. Due largely to funding issues, many of the new projects involve building new tollways or adding tolled express lanes to existing highways, which are managed by the North Texas Tollway Authority. It was originally established to manage the Dallas North Tollway and oversees several other toll projects in the area.

=== Public transit ===
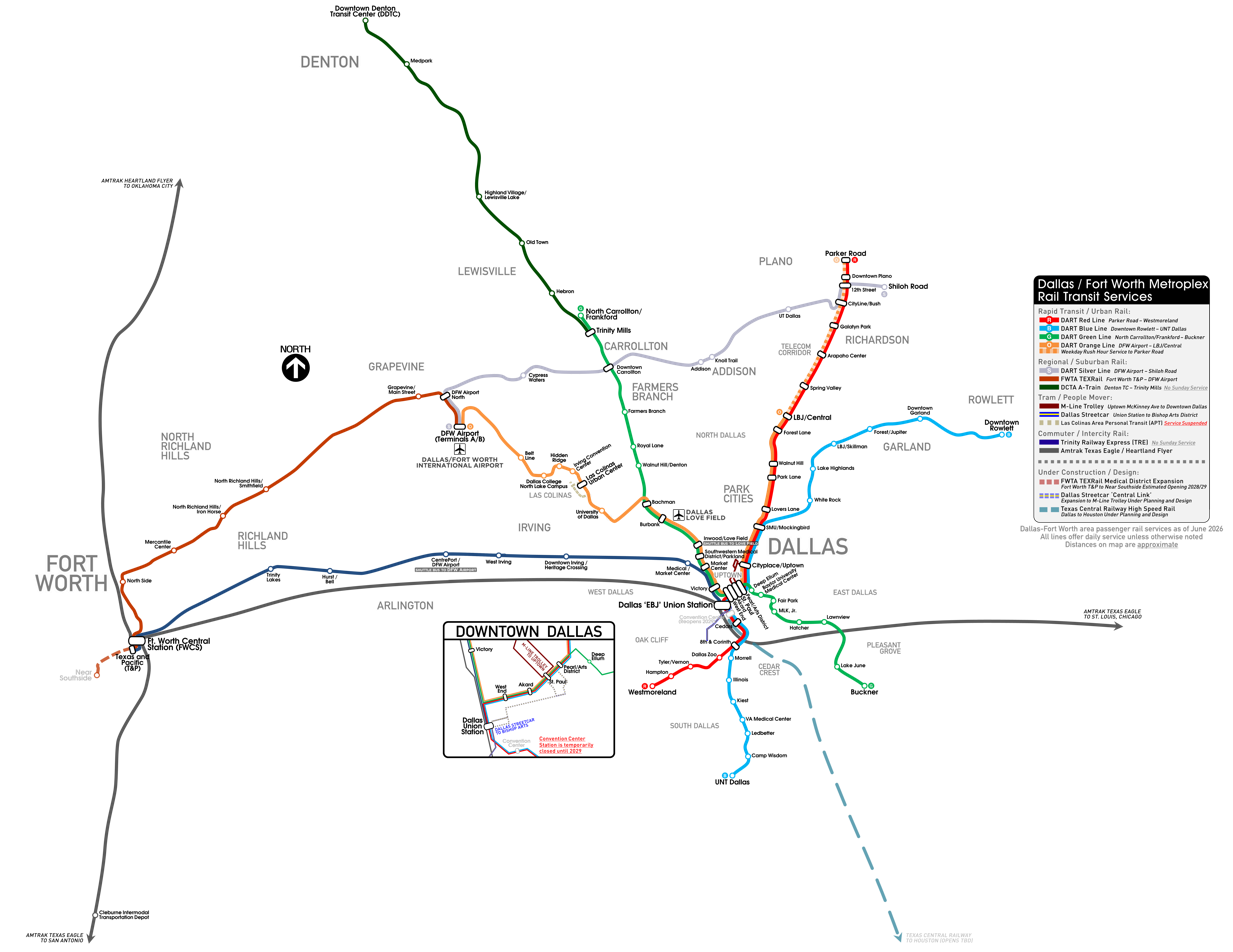
Map of rail transit in the Dallas–Fort Worth area

Public transit options continue to expand significantly throughout the Metroplex. However, it is limited in several outlying and rural suburbs. Dallas County and portions of Collin and Rockwall counties have bus service and light rail operated by DART, covering thirteen member cities. DART's rail network currently sprawls for 93 miles throughout the area. The Red Line extends north to Plano and southwest to Oak Cliff. The Blue Line reaches from Rowlett in the northeast to the University of North Texas at Dallas campus near I-20 in the south. The 28-mile Green Line, which opened in December 2010, connects Carrollton in the northwest through downtown Dallas to Pleasant Grove in the southeast. The Orange Line, which completed expansion in 2014, parallels the Red Line from Plano to Downtown Dallas and the Green Line from downtown Dallas to Northwest Highway before extending through the Las Colinas area of Irving to reach DFW International Airport.

Denton County has bus service limited to Denton, Highland Village, and Lewisville (with commuter service to downtown Dallas) provided by the Denton County Transportation Authority. The A-train, a diesel commuter rail line, parallels I-35E to connect Denton, Highland Village, Lewisville, and Carrollton. Several smaller towns along this line, Corinth, Shady Shores, and Lake Dallas, voted to abstain from the Denton County Transportation Authority and do not have stations. There is an across-the-platform transfer in Carrollton to the DART Green Line. A-Train service began June 20, 2011.

Tarrant County has bus services operated by Trinity Metro (formerly the Fort Worth Transportation Authority, popularly known as 'The T'), available only in Fort Worth. It additionally operates TEXRail commuter rail, which serves to connect downtown Fort Worth with DFW Airport and the DART Orange Line. The diesel commuter train that serves Fort Worth and its eastern suburbs is operated as the Trinity Railway Express; it connects downtown Fort Worth to downtown Dallas, where it links to the DART light rail system. A station near its midpoint, Centerport, also serves DFW Airport via a free airport shuttle bus. The TRE is jointly owned by FWTA and DART. Amtrak serves two stations in the Metroplex—Dallas Union Station and Fort Worth Central Station. Both are served by the Texas Eagle route, which operates daily between Chicago and San Antonio (continuing on to Los Angeles three days a week), though only Fort Worth is served by the Fort Worth-Oklahoma City Heartland Flyer.

As of 2016 the Taiwanese airline EVA Air operates a shuttle bus service from George Bush Intercontinental Airport in Houston to Richardson, so that Dallas-based customers may fly on its services to and from Houston.

== See also ==
- List of metropolitan statistical areas
- Texas Triangle
- Texas statistical areas
