= Farm to Market Road 148 =

Farm to Market Road 148

Route information
- Maintained by TxDOT
- Length: 38.253 mi (61.562 km)
- Existed: 1945–present

Major junctions
- South end: SH 274 near Kemp
- US 175 in Crandall; I-20 in Terrell
- North end: US 80 / SH 205 in Terrell

Location
- Country: United States
- State: Texas
- Counties: Kaufman

Highway system
- Highways in Texas; Interstate; US; State; Former; Toll; Loops; Spurs; FM/RM; Park; Rec
← FM 147	→ FM 149

Farm to Market Road 148 (FM 148) is a farm to market road located in Kaufman County in Texas.

== Route description ==
FM 148 begins at an intersection with State Highway 274 near Kemp just west of Cedar Creek Reservoir. The highway runs in a west–east direction from SH 274 to FM 3094, making a 90-degree angle to the north towards Grays Prairie. FM 148 enters the town of Scurry, sharing a short overlap with State Highway 34. The highway runs in a northwest direction to Crandall before turning northeast at US 175. The highway enters the town of Talty before entering Terrell. FM 148 meets Interstate 20 and Spur 557 in a fast growing area of the town's southwest side, before seeing less development. The highway ends at an intersection with US 80, continuing north as State Highway 205.

== History ==
FM 148 was originally designated on February 28, 1945, running from US 175 in Crandall to US 80 in Terrell. The highway was extended further south on June 28 of that year to Peeltown. FM 148 was extended again on November 1, 1961 to SH 274, absorbing Farm to Market Road 988. On June 2, 1967, it was relocated east of Peeltown, with the old route becoming FM 3094. A bypass from US 175 east of Crandall to present FM 148 was legislated on August 16, 2023. When this bypass is built, FM 148 will be rerouted over it, Farm to Market Road 3039 will be extended east over the old route of FM 148 to the bypass, and the remainder of the old route will be redesignated as FM Spur 148.

== Junction list ==
The entire route is in Kaufman County.

Location	mi	km	Destinations	Notes
			SH 274 – Kemp, Gun Barrel City	
			FM 2613 south	
Grays Prairie			FM 2451 west – Rosser	
Grays Prairie			FM 1388 north – Kaufman	
Scurry			SH 34 south – Ennis	South end of SH 34 overlap
Scurry			SH 34 north – Kaufman	North end of SH 34 overlap
			FM 1390 south	South end of FM 1390 overlap
			FM 1390 north	North end of FM 1390 overlap
Crandall			FM 3039 west – Combine	
Crandall			US 175 – Dallas, Kaufman	
			FM 2932 west to I-20	
Talty			FM 1641 north – Forney	
			FM 987 south – Kaufman	
Terrell			I-20 – Dallas, Shreveport	I-20 exit 498
Terrell			To US 80 / I-20 (Spur 557) – Dallas, Shreveport	
Terrell			US 80 / SH 205 north – Forney, Wills Point, Rockwall	
1.000 mi = 1.609 km; 1.000 km = 0.621 mi: Concurrency terminus
