= Texas State Highway 34 =

State highway in Texas

State Highway 34

Route information
- Maintained by TxDOT
- Length: 130.197 mi (209.532 km)
- Existed: 1919–present

Major junctions
- South end: I-35E in Italy
- US 77 in Italy; US 287 in Ennis; I-45 in Ennis; US 175 in Kaufman; I-20 in Terrell; I-30 / US 67 in Greenville; US 69 / US 380 in Greenville
- North end: US 82 / FM 100 near Honey Grove

Location
- Country: United States
- State: Texas
- Counties: Ellis, Kaufman, Hunt, Fannin

Highway system
- Highways in Texas; Interstate; US; State; Former; Toll; Loops; Spurs; FM/RM; Park; Rec
← SH 33	→ I-35

State Highway 34 (SH 34) is a state highway in the U.S. state of Texas that runs from Honey Grove to Italy near the Dallas–Fort Worth Metroplex.

== History ==
SH 34 was originally proposed on November 19, 1917, starting in Ft. Worth travelling southeast to Ennis. On October 15, 1923, SH 34 was extended to Kaufman. On December 17, 1923, SH 34 was extended to Greenville, replacing SH 38. On May 25, 1925, the eastern end had been extended north to Honey Grove. On December 21, 1926, it was extended north to the Oklahoma state line via the current FM 100. On October 10, 1927, the western end had been extended to near Jacksboro. On July 15, 1935, the section north of Honey Grove was cancelled as it was never built.

On September 26, 1939, the section from Jacksboro to Ennis was removed from SH 34, becoming parts of U.S. Highway 287 and SH 319 (which was originally planned as SH 281 and became part of SH 199 one month later). It was instead routed farther southwest into Italy, replacing SH 306. In or around 1945, the section from Kaufman to Ennis was re-routed through Scurry, south of Rosser, and on a new bridge over the Trinity River. The former route from Scurry to Peeltown (Kaufman County) was assigned to an extension of Farm to Market Road 148, and about a mile of the old route is now Farm to Market Road 1181 in Telico (Ellis County). The old bridge over the Trinity River no longer exists ; in addition, the replacement bridge (a narrow, two-lane truss bridge) was replaced with a wider, traditional span. On August 18, 1987, SH 34 was extended north from US 77 to I-35E, replacing FM 1134. On April 24, 2003, SH 34 was extended east and north concurrent with SH 56 and FM 100 to US 82.

A bypass around the city of Terrell was designated on February 28, 2013, but completed in early 2014. Construction began in October 2014 on a bypass around the city of Kaufman, with construction lasting approximately 22 months. The section south of US 175 opened in May 2016 while the section north of US 175 opened later that year in August.

== Route description ==
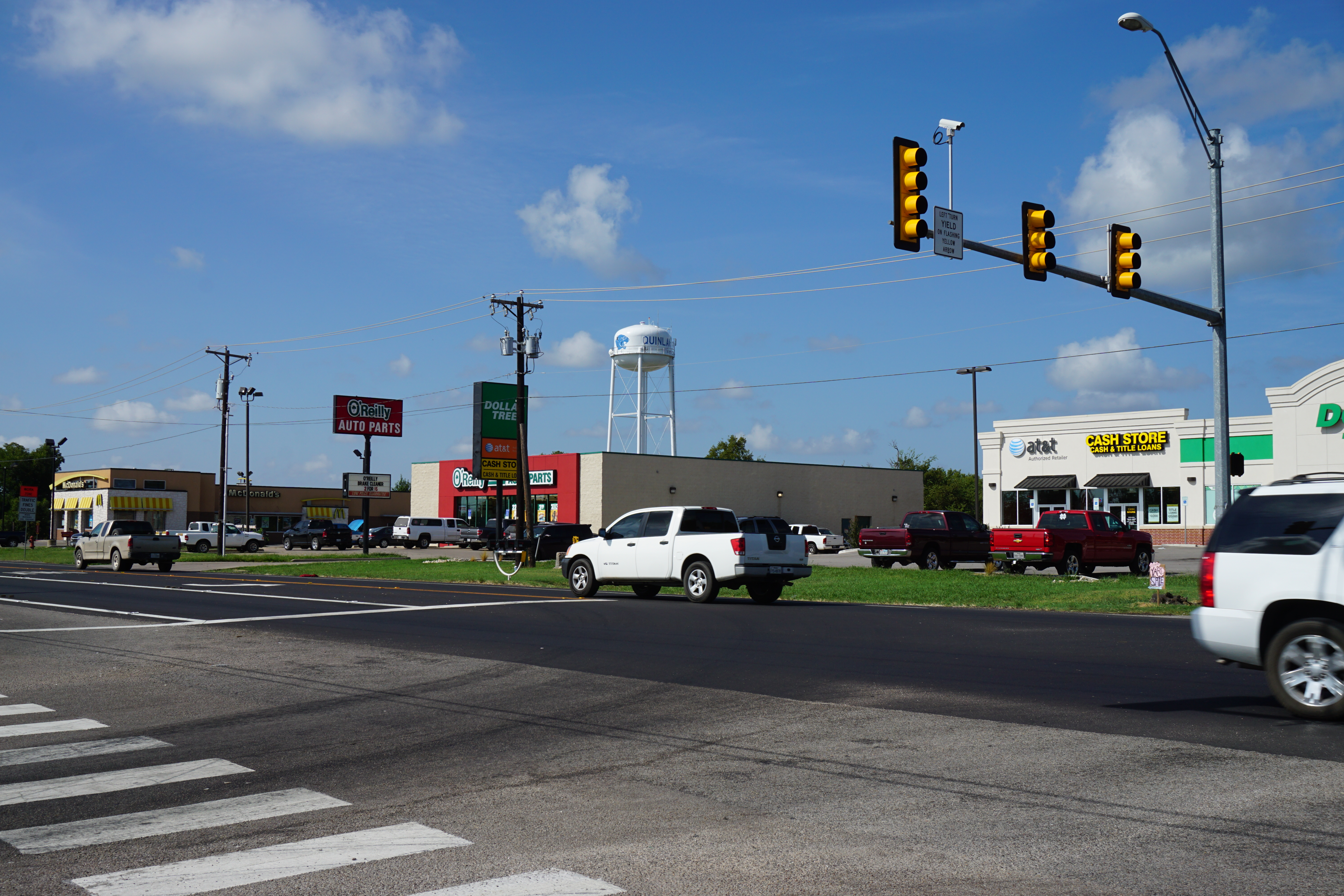
State Highway 34 in Quinlan

SH 34 begins at I-35E in the community of Italy. The highway runs southeast through the town to US 77 before turning in a more east direction. Near Avalon, the highway turns to the northeast and runs through the community of Bardwell before crossing Lake Bardwell. After crossing the lake, SH 34 enters Ennis and intersects US 287. The highway shares overlaps with the business routes of I-45 and US 287 in the city and leaves the city after intersecting I-45.

After crossing the Trinity River, SH 34 enters Kaufman County and runs near the communities of Scurry and Rosser before entering Kaufman. The highway intersects US 175 and shares an overlap with SH 243 in the city. Leaving the city, SH 34 runs in a sharp northeast direction for a few miles, turning north in Oak Ridge. In southern Terrell, the highway intersects I-20, which is the sight of a Tanger Outlet Center. Near Terrell Municipal Airport, SH 34 runs along a new alignment, bypassing the downtown area of the city and crosses over US 80. Leaving Terrell, the highway runs by many farms before turning more north and running near the western shore of Lake Tawakoni. In Quinlan, the highway shares a short overlap with SH 276 and crosses near an inlet of Tawakoni north of the town. Since 2023, the short overlap that SH 34 and SH 276 shared was eliminated when SH 276 was rerouted south of Quinlan.

Entering Hunt County, SH 34 runs in a straight north direction. The highway enters Greenville and intersects I-30/US 67, which used to be a cloverleaf interchange. Shortly after intersecting US 69/US 380, SH 34 overlaps with a business route of US 69 through the city's downtown area. Leaving the city, the highway serves as the western terminus for SH 224. North of Wolfe City, the highway makes a sharp turn and runs east for a few miles before turning back north in Ladonia. SH 34 intersects SH 56 in Honey Grove before terminating at US 82 just north of the town.

== Junction list ==
County	Location	mi	km	Destinations	Notes
Ellis	Italy	0.0	0.0	I-35E	I-35E exit 386
Ellis	Italy	1.1	1.8	US 77	
Ellis	Italy	2.2	3.5	FM 667 south – Frost	
Ellis	Avalon	7.4	11.9	FM 55 north – Waxahachie	South end of FM 55 overlap
Ellis	Avalon	7.5	12.1	FM 55 south – Blooming Grove	North end of FM 55 overlap
Ellis		11.2	18.0	FM 877 north – Waxahachie	
Ellis	Bardwell	14.6	23.5	FM 984 south – Rankin	South end of FM 984 overlap
Ellis	Bardwell	14.7	23.7	FM 984 north – Howard	North end of FM 984 overlap
Ellis		15.2	24.5	FM 985 south – Lake Bardwell	
Ellis	Ennis	18.7	30.1	US 287 – Waxahachie, Corsicana	Interchange
Ellis	Ennis	19.9	32.0	Spur 437 north (Clay Street)	
Ellis	Ennis	20.5	33.0	FM 1183 (Oak Grove Road) – Alma	
Ellis	Ennis	20.7	33.3	I-45 BL south (Kaufman Street) / FM 1181 north (Creechville Road)	South end of BL I-45 overlap
Ellis	Ennis	21.4	34.4	I-45 BL north (Kaufman Street) / Bus. US 287 west (Ennis Avenue)	North end of BL I-45 overlap
Ellis	Ennis	22.0	35.4	I-45 – Dallas, Corsicana	I-45 exit 251B
Ellis	Crisp	24.7	39.8	FM 660 north – Crisp	
Ellis		28.4	45.7	FM 1181 south	
Kaufman	Rosser	36.0	57.9	FM 2451 west – Rosser	South end of FM 2451 overlap
Kaufman	Rosser	36.4	58.6	FM 2451 east – Cottonwood	North end of FM 2451 overlap
Kaufman		38.5	62.0	FM 1390 north	
Kaufman	Scurry	41.2	66.3	FM 148 south – Cedar Creek Reservoir	South end of FM 148 overlap
Kaufman	Scurry	41.4	66.6	FM 148 north – Crandall	North end of FM 148 overlap
Kaufman	Kaufman	45.8	73.7	Bus. SH 34 north – Kaufman	
Kaufman	Kaufman	46.4	74.7	FM 1388 (Houston Street) – Oak Grove	
Kaufman	Kaufman	47.9	77.1	US 175 – Dallas, Athens	Interchange
Kaufman	Kaufman	49.0	78.9	FM 1836 (Temple Street)	
Kaufman	Kaufman	49.4	79.5	SH 243 (Mulberry Street) – Kaufman, Canton	
Kaufman		51.8	83.4	FM 2728 north – Elmo	
Kaufman	Terrell	58.2	93.7	I-20 – Dallas, Shreveport	I-20 exit 501
Kaufman	Terrell	60.1	96.7	Spur 226 north (Virginia Street) / Airport Road – Downtown, Airport	Spur 226 former Bus. SH 34 north
Kaufman	Terrell	60.9	98.0	Spur 87 east (High Street) – Terrell State Hospital	
Kaufman		63.2	101.7	Bus. SH 34 south – Terrell	Bus. SH 34 decommissioned July 2017
Hunt		74.6	120.1	Spur 264 north	
Hunt	Quinlan	75.6	121.7	SH 276 – West Tawakoni	
Hunt	Quinlan	76.1	122.5	Bus. SH 276 west – Royse City, Rockwall	
Hunt		79.0	127.1	FM 2101 north – Lake Tawakoni - Caddo Inlet	
Hunt		83.5	134.4	FM 1564 west	South end of FM 1564 overlap
Hunt		84.1	135.3	FM 1564 east	North end of FM 1564 overlap
Hunt		85.5	137.6	FM 1903 west – Caddo Mills	
Hunt	Greenville	87.8	141.3	FM 1570 – Airport	
Hunt	Greenville	89.2	143.6	I-30 / US 67 – Dallas, Texarkana	I-30 exit 93
Hunt	Greenville	91.0	146.5	US 69 / US 380 (Joe Ramsey Boulevard) – Denison, McKinney, Emory	
Hunt	Greenville	91.9	147.9	Bus. US 69 south (Oneal Street)	South end of Bus. US 69 overlap
Hunt	Greenville	92.5	148.9	Spur 302 (Lee Street)	
Hunt	Greenville	93.0	149.7	Bus. US 69 north (Sockwell Boulevard)	North end of Bus. US 69 overlap
Hunt	Greenville	93.6	150.6	SH 224 east – Commerce	
Hunt		99.7	160.5	FM 3427 west – Kingston	
Hunt				FM 1566 east	South end of FM 1566
Hunt				FM 1566 west	North end of FM 1566 overlap
Hunt	Wolfe City			FM 512 south – Campbell	
Hunt	Wolfe City			FM 816 west – Bailey	
Hunt	Wolfe City			SH 11 – Whitewright, Sulphur Springs	
Fannin				FM 68 west	
Fannin	Ladonia			FM 2990 north	
Fannin	Ladonia			SH 50 south – Commerce	
Fannin	Ladonia			FM 64 east – Pecan Gap	
Fannin				FM 1550	
Fannin	Honey Grove			SH 56 west – Bonham	West end of SH 56 overlap
Fannin	Honey Grove			SH 56 east (Main Street) / FM 100 begins	East end of SH 56 overlap; south end of FM 100 overlap
Fannin	Honey Grove			US 82 / FM 100 north – Bonham, Paris	Northern terminus; road continues north as FM 100; US 82 exit 686
1.000 mi = 1.609 km; 1.000 km = 0.621 mi: Concurrency terminus; Closed/former; Route transition

== Business routes ==
There are currently no business routes for SH 34, though the highway previously had two.

=== Terrell ===
Business State Highway 34
- Location: Terrell
- Length: 3.3 mi (5.3 km)
- Existed: February 28, 2013–July 27, 2017

Business State Highway 34-A (Bus. SH 34-A) was a bypass of Terrell, designated on February 28, 2013 and completed in early 2014. This business route was removed from the state highway system on July 27, 2017; the southern part of Bus. SH 34-A was re-designated as Spur 226 while the northern section was given over to the city of Terrell.

=== Kaufman ===
Business State Highway 34
- Location: Kaufman
- Length: 3.1 mi (5.0 km)
- Existed: October 19, 2016–September 24, 2020

A second business route served the downtown area of Kaufman, along Washington Street and Mulberry Street. The route ran along a previous routing of SH 34. It became a business route after a bypass was completed in October 2016 around the south and east sides of Kaufman for SH 34. The Kaufman business route had been completely cancelled and removed by September 24, 2020, with maintenance being turned over to the city.
