= James Dearth =

American football player (born 1976)

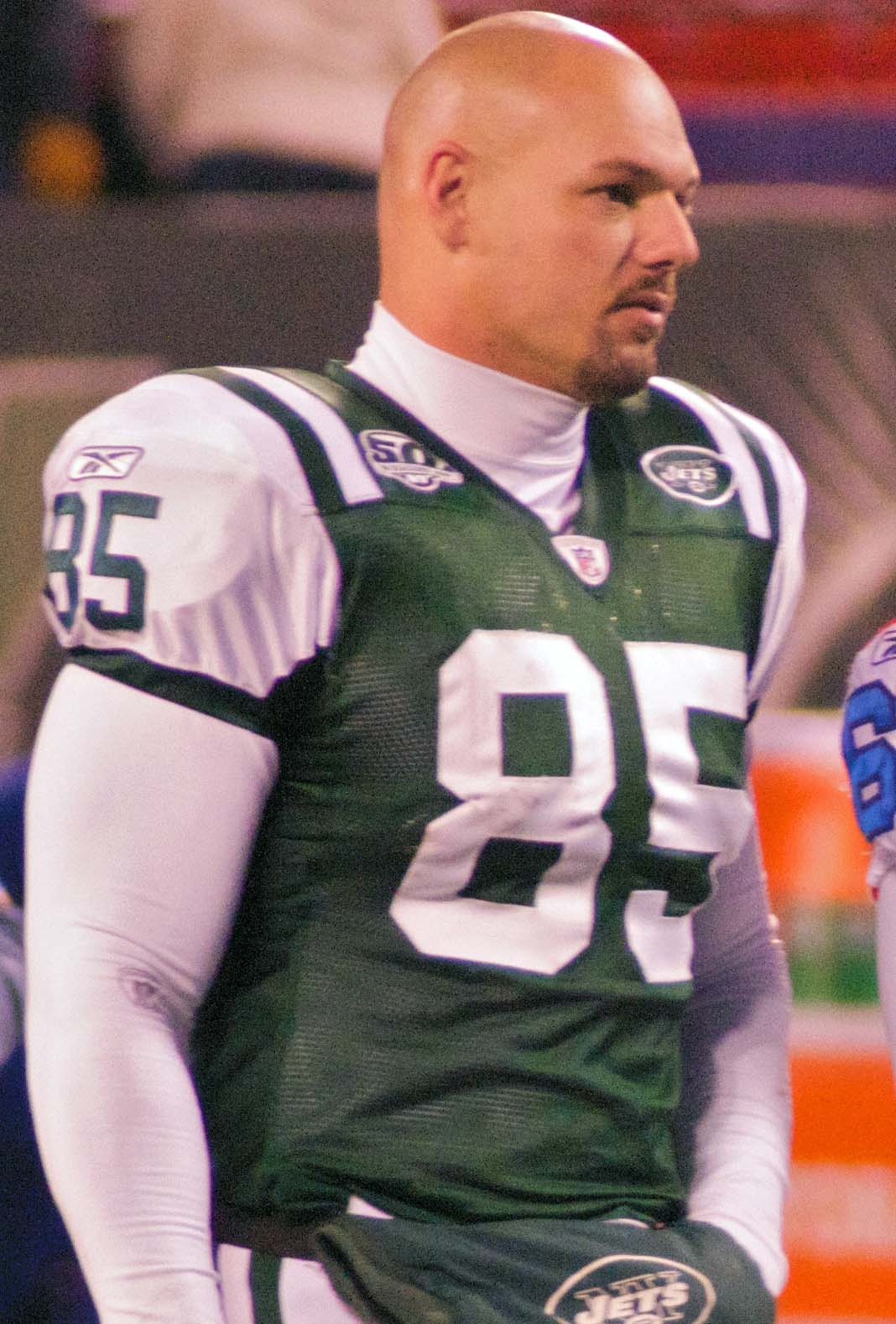
- Dearth with the New York Jets in 2009

No. 88, 85
- Positions: Long snapper, tight end

Personal information
- Born: January 22, 1976 (age 50); Fort Ord, California, U.S.
- Listed height: 6 ft 4 in (1.93 m)
- Listed weight: 265 lb (120 kg)

Career information
- High school: Scurry-Rosser (Scurry, Texas)
- College: Tarleton State
- NFL draft: 1999: 6th round, 191st overall pick

Career history
- Cleveland Browns (1999); Tennessee Titans (2000)*; New York Jets (2001–2009); Washington Redskins (2010)*; San Diego Chargers (2010); New England Patriots (2011)*
- * Offseason or practice squad member only

Career NFL statistics
- Games played: 146
- Receptions: 3
- Receiving yards: 10
- Receiving touchdowns: 1
- Stats at Pro Football Reference

James Dearth (born January 22, 1976) is an American former professional football player who was a long snapper in the National Football League (NFL). Dearth played college football for the Tarleton State Texans and was selected by the Cleveland Browns in the sixth round of the 1999 NFL draft.

He was also a member of the Tennessee Titans, New York Jets, Washington Redskins, San Diego Chargers and New England Patriots.

== Early life ==
Dearth attended Scurry-Rosser High School in Scurry, Texas and was a student and a letterman in football. In football, he was a starter at both, quarterback and middle linebacker, and was an All-State honoree at both positions.

== Professional career ==
=== Cleveland Browns ===
Dearth was selected by the Cleveland Browns in the sixth round (191st overall) of the 1999 NFL draft. He signed with the team on July 22, and was released on September 3. He was signed to Cleveland's practice squad on November 23. Dearth was promoted to the active roster on December 14 and played in the final two regular season games for the Browns that season. He was released on April 18, 2000.

=== Tennessee Titans ===
Dearth signed with the Tennessee Titans on July 15, 2000.He was released on August 22, and later signed to the Titans' practice squad on November 8, 2000. He became a free agent after the 2000 season.

=== New York Jets ===
In 2001, the New York Jets signed Dearth as a tight end/long snapper. In that same year he recorded a career-high three receptions and a touchdown. Following the season, Dearth was relegated to long snapping duties and was a consistent part of the Jets' special teams unit until he became a free agent and was replaced by Tanner Purdum following the 2009 season.

=== Washington Redskins ===
On August 14, 2010, Dearth signed with the Washington Redskins. Dearth was expected to compete with the "inconsistent" Nick Sundberg. Despite Sundberg's inconsistencies he slowly progressed throughout training camp and eventually Dearth was waived on August 31, 2010, in favor of the improved Sundberg.

=== San Diego Chargers ===
The San Diego Chargers signed Dearth on September 15, 2010, after a hamstring injury saw long snapper David Binn placed on injured reserve. Two days later on September 17, 2010, Dearth suffered a foot injury during practice and was subsequently placed on injured reserve before playing a game for the Chargers.

=== New England Patriots ===
Dearth signed with the New England Patriots on August 29, 2011. He was released on September 4.

== Personal ==
Dearth is married to his wife, Laurie, with whom he has three children, Kaitlyn, Kendall, and Kolton. Dearth, a devout Christian, is known to be a "low-key and cordial" person.

Dearth used to co-own an Athletic Republic franchise in the Houston area with friend and former Jets running back Derrick Blaylock. The facility opened in December 2009 aiming to help young athletes prepare for professional careers.
