= Arah, Texas =

Ghost town in Texas, US

Arah
- Ghost town
- Location within Texas
- Coordinates: 32°45′29″N 101°08′06″W
- Country: United States
- State: Texas
- County: Scurry
- Elevation: 2,457 ft (749 m)

Arah is a ghost town in Scurry County, Texas, United States.

Named for Arah Gray, daughter of rancher E. W. Gray who settled in the area in the 1890s, other families arrived and started businesses throughout the early 20th century, with 35 residents there in 1914. A post office operated from 1907, until being consolidated with Snyder in March 1949. The town declined during and after the Great Depression. Despite oil discoveries in the 1950, its last business closed by 1962, and was abandoned by 1969.
