= Cottonwood, Kaufman County, Texas =

Cottonwood, Texas
- City
- Location of Cottonwood in Kaufman County, Texas
- Coordinates: 32°27′40″N 96°23′04″W
- Country: United States
- State: Texas
- Counties: Kaufman

Area
  - Total: 1.56 sq mi (4.04 km^{2})
  - Land: 1.56 sq mi (4.04 km^{2})
  - Water: 0 sq mi (0.00 km^{2})
- Elevation: 404 ft (123 m)

Population (2020)
  - Total: 181
  - Density: 116/sq mi (44.8/km^{2})
- Time zone: UTC-6 (Central (CST))
  - Summer (DST): UTC-5 (CDT)
- Area codes: 214, 469, 945, 972
- FIPS code: 48-17200
- GNIS feature ID: 2410244
- Website: www.cityofcottonwoodtexas.gov

Cottonwood is a city in Kaufman County, Texas, United States. The population was 181 at the 2020 census.

== Geography ==
Cottonwood is located in southwestern Kaufman County along country roads east of Rosser, south of Scurry, and west of Grays Prairie. It is 12 miles (19 km) southwest of Kaufman, the county seat, and 39 miles (63 km) southeast of the center of Dallas.

According to the United States Census Bureau, Cottonwood has a total area of 1.72 square miles (4.46 km^{2}), all land.

== Demographics ==
Historical population
Census	Pop.	Note	%±
1990	156		—
2000	181		16.0%
2010	185		2.2%
2020	181		−2.2%
U.S. Decennial Census; 2020 Census

As of the census of 2000, there were 181 people, 65 households, and 54 families residing in the city. The population density was 117.1 inhabitants per square mile (45.2/km^{2}). There were 69 housing units at an average density of 44.6 per square mile (17.2/km^{2}). The racial makeup of the city was 96.13% White, 1.10% African American, 1.66% from other races, and 1.10% from two or more races. Hispanic or Latino of any race were 2.76% of the population.

There were 65 households, out of which 41.5% had children under the age of 18 living with them, 76.9% were married couples living together, 4.6% had a female householder with no husband present, and 15.4% were non-families. 13.8% of all households were made up of individuals, and 7.7% had someone living alone who was 65 years of age or older. The average household size was 2.78 and the average family size was 3.05.

In the city, the population was spread out, with 28.7% under the age of 18, 5.0% from 18 to 24, 34.8% from 25 to 44, 23.8% from 45 to 64, and 7.7% who were 65 years of age or older. The median age was 36 years. For every 100 females, there were 105.7 males. For every 100 females age 18 and over, there were 92.5 males.

The median income for a household in the city was $50,625, and the median income for a family was $57,500. Males had a median income of $46,250 versus $26,563 for females. The per capita income for the city was $23,189. About 6.5% of families and 13.4% of the population were below the poverty line, including 18.9% of those under the age of eighteen and 22.2% of those 65 or over.

== Education ==
Cottonwood is served by the Scurry-Rosser Independent School District.
