= Jason Massey =

American murderer (1973–2001)

- Born: January 7, 1973; Ellis County, Texas, U.S.
- Died: April 3, 2001 (aged 28); Huntsville Unit, Texas, U.S.
- Status: Executed by lethal injection
- Motive: Desire to become a serial killer
- Conviction: Capital murder
- Penalty: Death

Details
- Victims: James Brian King, 14; Christina Benjamin, 13
- Date: July 27, 1993
- Country: United States
- State: Texas
- Weapons: .22-caliber pistol, knife

Jason Eric Massey (January 7, 1973 – April 3, 2001) was an American murderer who was executed in 2001 for the murders of two teenagers. He had expressed his desire to become a serial killer.

== Background ==
Massey was born on January 7, 1973, in Ellis County, Texas. He was neglected and abused by his alcoholic father and his drug-addicted mother. By his teens, he was a juvenile delinquent with a lengthy criminal record, mostly for torturing animals and stalking. His mother once committed him to a psychiatric hospital after discovering his journals, in which he detailed his fantasies about rape and murder, his hero worship of Charles Manson, his avowed Satanism, and his strong desire to become a serial killer. Massey was known to decapitate and mutilate dogs, cats, and cows, preserving their skulls in coolers as trophies.

== Crime ==
On July 27, 1993, Massey murdered two teenagers: 14-year-old James Brian King and his 13-year-old stepsister, Christina Benjamin, in his hometown. He cut off Christina's head, hands and nipples, mutilated her genitals, and removed her intestines. He shot King twice in the head. On July 29, both their bodies were found in a field near Telico by a road worker. There was evidence of sexual mutilation and some of the body parts were missing, which have never been found.

Massey was quickly connected to the crime by forensic evidence and arrested, shortly after getting out of jail for animal cruelty. In October of the following year, he was found guilty of capital murder.

The prosecution sought a death sentence for Massey. During the sentencing phase, a psychiatrist testified about the contents of Massey's journal and said the most concerning part was when the writing shifted from fantasy to reality. Massey wrote about planning his murders by talking about how to evade detection to the police and purchasing weapons. Dekleva said there was no possible treatment for an individual like Massey and that he was a lasting threat to society. A classmate of Massey's testified that he had repeatedly threatened her. It was later revealed that Massey had killed and mutilated her dog, before spreading its blood on her car. Another witness testified that while he was walking in the woods, he had found a cooler containing animal bones. There were also journals where Massey talked about his plans of becoming a serial killer. In one entry, he wrote that he planned to kill 700 people within 20 years. In another, he wrote that he had killed 73 cats and dogs, as well as seven cows.

It took jurors only 15 minutes to order his execution. While on death row, he reportedly converted to Christianity.

== Execution ==
Massey was executed by lethal injection on April 3, 2001. Before his execution, he confessed his crime to the murdered teenagers' family and apologized. His last meal consisted of three fried chicken quarters, fried squash, fried eggplant, mashed potatoes, snap peas, boiled cabbage, three bits of corn on the cob with spinach, broccoli and butter, and one pint of ice cream, served with a pitcher of sweet tea.

== In popular culture ==
Massey's crime was documented on an episode of the TV series Forensic Files called "Pure Evil". It is one of the few episodes rated TV-MA.

== See also ==
- Capital punishment in Texas
- Capital punishment in the United States
- List of people executed in Texas, 2000–2009
- List of people executed in the United States in 2001
