= Scurry-Rosser Independent School District =

School district in Texas, United States

Coordinates: 32°29′34.9″N 96°24′15.2″W

Address
- 10705 S. State Highway 34 Scurry, Texas, 75158; United States

District information
- Type: Public

Other information
- Website: www.scurry-rosser.com

Scurry-Rosser Independent School District is a school district based in Scurry, Texas (USA).

In addition to Scurry, the district serves the towns of Rosser, Cottonwood, and Grays Prairie in southwestern Kaufman County.

For the 2022–23 school year, the district was rated by the Texas Education Agency as follows: 84 (B) overall, 83 (B) for Student Achievement, 84 (B) for School Progress, and 85 (B) for Closing the Gaps.

== Schools ==
- Scurry-Rosser Elementary School
- Scurry-Rosser Middle School
- Scurry-Rosser High School
