= Sand Branch, Dallas County, Texas =

Unincorporated community in Texas, US

Coordinates: 32°38′06″N 96°37′11″W

Sand Branch
- Unincorporated area
- Interactive map of Sand Branch
- Country: United States
- State: Texas
- County: Dallas

Population (2019)
  - Total: 100
- Time zone: UTC-6 (Central Standard Time)
  - Summer (DST): UTC-5 (Central Daylight Time)
- Zip Code: 75159
- Area code(s): 214, 469, 945, 972

Sand Branch (sometimes spelled Sandbranch) is an unincorporated community in Dallas County, Texas, United States. A 2019 estimate put the population at around 100.

== Geography ==
Sand Branch is located approximately two miles south of U.S. Highway 175 and 14 miles southeast of Downtown Dallas on Belt Line Road in southeastern Dallas County. It is situated between the Trinity River and Hickory Creek, southwest of Seagoville. Sand Branch is the only unincorporated settlement left in Dallas County, as the vast majority of the county lies within incorporated cities.

== Background ==
The Sand Branch Community has long been considered one of the poorest areas in Dallas County. While the community was formed for freed Black Americans, some of the original families have been forced out by poor living conditions or forced to sell their land for as little as $300. A small portion of the original families continue to hold on to the lands.

The area's living conditions and lack of basic services in the largely lower-income, predominantly African American community resemble a "non-border colonia" because of its similarities to those settlements situated along the southwestern United States border with Mexico.

One of the challenges of the community is that residents must transport water to use it: despite existing next to a wastewater treatment facility, no water infrastructure exists in Sand Branch (due to its unincorporated status), and the wells are non-potable due to decades of contamination.

== Demographics ==
In the Handbook of Texas in 2000, the community had an estimated population of 400. The community did not participate in the 2010 Census.

== Streets ==
Ten streets are located within the community Sand Branch. They are:

- Banks Drive
- Bunche Drive
- Burns Drive
- Kirsan Drive
- Moore Road
- Lake Street
- Pin Oak Road
- Tom Lee Drive
- Wilmer-Kleberg Road
- Bunche Street

== Education ==
Public education in the community of Sand Branch is provided by the Dallas Independent School District. Zoned campuses include Seagoville Elementary (grades PK-5), Kleberg Elementary School (grades PK-5), Seagoville Middle School (grades 6-8), and Seagoville High School (grades 9-12).
