= Telico, Texas =

Unincorporated community in Texas, US

Coordinates: 32°22′20″N 96°30′45″W

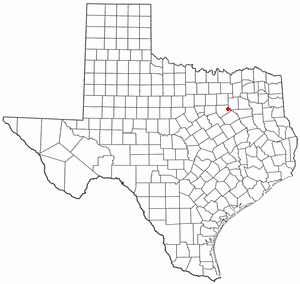
Location of Telico, Texas

Telico is an unincorporated community in northeastern Ellis County, Texas, United States, on Highway 34.

== History ==
The area that became Telico was settled before 1856. It was first called Trinity City but was renamed in the mid-1850s to Telico after Telico, North Carolina. The town was based on agriculture and had a cotton gin that local farmers used for several decades until they renovated it in the early 2000s to create a wedding venue.

== Notable people ==
- Clyde Barrow, born near Telico, was an outlaw in the team Bonnie and Clyde, who traveled the Central United States during the Great Depression in the early and mid-1930s.
- Jason Massey, murderer of two teenagers. His case was featured on the popular crime show Forensic Files.
