= Scurry, Texas =

- Town
- Location of Scurry in Kaufman County, Texas
- Coordinates: 32°30′25″N 96°23′10″W
- Country: United States
- State: Texas
- Counties: Kaufman

Area
  - Total: 1.93 sq mi (4.99 km^{2})
  - Land: 1.93 sq mi (4.99 km^{2})
  - Water: 0 sq mi (0.00 km^{2})
- Elevation: 420 ft (130 m)

Population (2020)
  - Total: 688
  - Density: 357/sq mi (138/km^{2})
- Time zone: UTC-6 (Central (CST))
  - Summer (DST): UTC-5 (CDT)
- ZIP Code: 75158
- Area codes: 214, 469, 945, 972
- FIPS Code: 48-66368
- GNIS feature ID: 2413268
- Website: tshaonline.org/handbook/online/articles/hls33

Scurry is a town in Kaufman County, Texas, United States. It was incorporated in 2003. As of the 2020 census, it had a population of 688.

Scurry is named for Confederate General William Read Scurry. The arrival of the Texas and Pacific Railway in the 1870s established the settlement as a shipment point for area farmers. When local residents requested a post office, they submitted the name Scurry – in honor of Gen. Scurry, who was killed during the Civil War at the Battle of Jenkins' Ferry in April 1864. Post service began in 1883 and a year later, Scurry had an estimated population of fifty.

== Geography ==
Scurry is located along State Highway 34 in southwestern Kaufman County, 7 miles (11 km) southwest of Kaufman and 34 miles (55 km) southeast of Dallas.

According to the U.S. Census Bureau, the town has an area of 1.9 square miles (5.0 km^{2}), all land.

=== Climate ===
The climate in this area is characterized by hot, humid summers and generally mild to cool winters. According to the Köppen climate classification, Scurry has a humid subtropical climate, Cfa on climate maps.

== History ==
The first settlers in the area arrived in the mid-1840s. Over the next quarter century, a church and school community developed and the number of farms increased. The arrival of the Texas and Pacific Railway in the 1870s established the settlement as a shipment point for area farmers. When local residents requested a post office, they submitted the name "Scurry"—in honor of Scurry Dean, who was killed during the Civil War. Postal service began in 1883, and a year later, Scurry had an estimated population of 50. By 1914, the community was home to around 400 people and a number of businesses. The Great Depression caused Scurry to decline, which lasted through the first decade after World War II. Only 250 people remained in the community by the mid-1950s. The trend was reversed during the latter half of the 20th century. In 1990, 9 businesses and about 315 people were living in the community. That figure approached 600 by 2000, and Scurry was officially incorporated as a town three years later.

== Demographics ==
Historical population
Census	Pop.	Note	%±
1990	315		—
2000	600		90.5%
2010	681		13.5%
2020	688		1.0%
U.S. Decennial Census; 2020 Census

== Education ==
Public education in the town of Scurry is provided by the Scurry-Rosser Independent School District. The district has three campuses and also serves the incorporated communities of Rosser, Cottonwood, and Grays Prairie in southwestern Kaufman County.
