= Grays Prairie, Texas =

- Village
- Location of Grays Prairie in Kaufman County, Texas
- Coordinates: 32°29′14″N 96°20′54″W
- Country: United States
- State: Texas
- County: Kaufman

Area
  - Total: 1.22 sq mi (3.17 km^{2})
  - Land: 1.22 sq mi (3.17 km^{2})
  - Water: 0 sq mi (0.00 km^{2})
- Elevation: 449 ft (137 m)

Population (2020)
  - Total: 325
  - Density: 266/sq mi (103/km^{2})
- Time zone: UTC-6 (Central (CST))
  - Summer (DST): UTC-5 (CDT)
- Area codes: 214, 469, 945, 972
- FIPS code: 48-30752
- GNIS feature ID: 2413555
- Website: graysprairietx.com

Grays Prairie is a village in Kaufman County, Texas, United States. Its population was 325 at the 2020 census.

== Geography ==
Grays Prairie is located in southern Kaufman County 9 miles (14 km) south of Kaufman, the county seat, and the same distance northwest of Kemp.

According to the United States Census Bureau, the village has a total area of 1.3 square miles (3.3 km^{2}), of which 0.7 acres (2,784 m^{2}), or 0.08%, is covered by water.

== Demographics ==
Historical population
Census	Pop.	Note	%±
1990	286		—
2000	296		3.5%
2010	337		13.9%
2020	325		−3.6%
U.S. Decennial Census; 2020 census

As of the census of 2000, 296 people, 98 households, and 87 families resided in the village. The population density was 235.5 inhabitants per square mile (90.9/km^{2}). The 103 housing units had an average density of 81.9/sq mi (31.6/km^{2}). The racial makeup of the village was 92.23% White, 2.03% African American, 0.68% Native American, 3.38% from other races, and 1.69% from two or more races. Hispanics or Latinos of any race were 7.43% of the population.

Of the 98 households, 45.9% had children under 18 living with them, 73.5% were married couples living together, 10.2% had a female householder with no husband present, and 11.2% were not families. About 5.1% of all households were made up of individuals, and 3.1% had someone living alone who was 65 or older. The average household size was 3.02,, and the average family size was 3.17.

In the village, the age distribution was 28.7% under, 9.8% from 18 to 24, 30.4% from 25 to 44, 22.3% from 45 to 64, and 8.8% who were 65 or older. The median age was 35 years. For every 100 females, there were 105.6 males. For every 100 females 18 and over, there were 102.9 males.

The median income for a household in the village was $43,864, and for a family was $44,722. Males had a median income of $36,000 versus $31,667 for females. The per capita income for the village was $17,529. None of the families and 1.5% of the population were living below the poverty line, including no one under 18 and 8.3% of those 65 or older.

== Education ==
Grays Prairie is served by the Scurry-Rosser Independent School District.
