= Rosser, Texas =

- Village
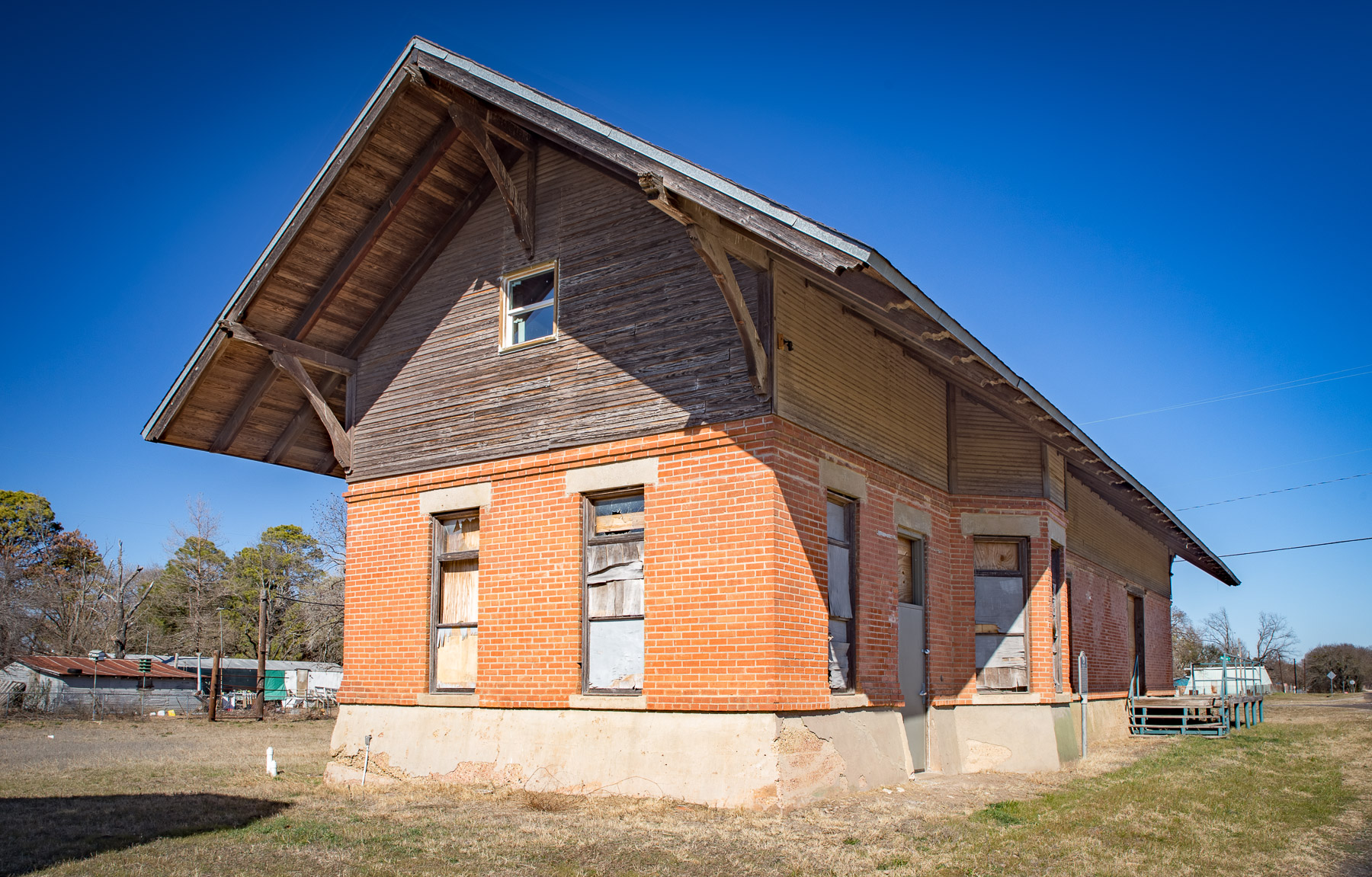
- Rosser Train Depot (2022)

- Location of Rosser in Kaufman County, Texas
- Coordinates: 32°27′37″N 96°27′09″W
- Country: United States
- State: Texas
- County: Kaufman

Area
  - Total: 1.94 sq mi (5.03 km^{2})
  - Land: 1.91 sq mi (4.95 km^{2})
  - Water: 0.031 sq mi (0.08 km^{2})
- Elevation: 358 ft (109 m)

Population (2020)
  - Total: 301
  - Density: 157/sq mi (60.8/km^{2})
- Time zone: UTC-6 (Central (CST))
  - Summer (DST): UTC-5 (CDT)
- ZIP code: 75157
- Area codes: 214, 469, 945, 972
- FIPS code: 48-63404
- GNIS feature ID: 2413583

Rosser is a village in Kaufman County, Texas, United States. The population was 301 at the 2020 census.

== Geography ==
Rosser is in southwestern Kaufman County, about 2 miles (3 km) northeast of the Trinity River and the county line. The southeastern edge of the village follows Texas State Highway 34, which runs northeast 12 miles (19 km) to Kaufman, the county seat, and southwest 14 miles (23 km) to Ennis.

According to the United States Census Bureau, Rosser has a total area of 2.0 square miles (5.3 km^{2}), of which 0.03 square miles (0.08 km^{2}), or 1.49%, are water.

== Demographics ==
Historical population
Census	Pop.	Note	%±
1990	366		—
2000	379		3.6%
2010	332		−12.4%
2020	301		−9.3%
U.S. Decennial Census; 2020 Census

As of the census of 2000, there were 379 people, 132 households, and 97 families residing in the village. The population density was 188.5 inhabitants per square mile (72.8/km^{2}). There were 156 housing units at an average density of 77.6 per square mile (30.0/km^{2}). The racial makeup of the village was 58.84% White, 32.72% African American, 4.22% Native American, 1.85% from other races, and 2.37% from two or more races. Hispanic or Latino of any race were 4.22% of the population.

There were 132 households, out of which 32.6% had children under the age of 18 living with them, 57.6% were married couples living together, 11.4% had a female householder with no husband present, and 26.5% were non-families. 23.5% of all households were made up of individuals, and 12.1% had someone living alone who was 65 years of age or older. The average household size was 2.87 and the average family size was 3.40.

In the village, the population was spread out, with 29.0% under the age of 18, 10.3% from 18 to 24, 29.0% from 25 to 44, 20.1% from 45 to 64, and 11.6% who were 65 years of age or older. The median age was 34 years. For every 100 females, there were 92.4 males. For every 100 females age 18 and over, there were 88.1 males.

The median income for a household in the village was $38,558, and the median income for a family was $39,886. Males had a median income of $38,750 versus $23,750 for females. The per capita income for the village was $13,960. About 18.2% of families and 14.7% of the population were below the poverty line, including 10.4% of those under age 18 and 34.1% of those age 65 or over.

== Education ==
Rosser is served by the Scurry-Rosser Independent School District.
