= 2011 Dallas mayoral election =

- May 14, 2011
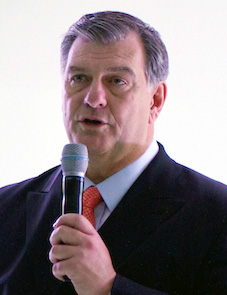

Nominee	Mike Rawlings	David Kunkle	Ron Natinsky
First round	28,424; 40.86%	22,229; 31.96%	17,430; 25.06%
Runoff	31,088; 55.80%	24,623; 44.20%	Eliminated
Mayor before election
Dwaine Caraway (Note: Caraway was the acting mayor.)
Elected mayor
Mike Rawlings

The 2011 Dallas mayoral election took place on May 14, 2011, to elect the successor to incumbent Mayor Tom Leppert. Leppert decided not to run for a second term, deciding to instead run for United States Senate in 2012. The race is officially nonpartisan. After no candidate received a majority of the votes, the top two candidates – Mike Rawlings and David Kunkle – faced each other in a runoff election on June 18, 2011 in which Rawlings prevailed.

== Candidates ==
- David Kunkle – Retired Police Chief of Dallas
- Ron Natinsky – Three term City Councilman from District 12 (Far North Dallas)
- Edward Okpa – Real Estate Appraiser and Perennial Candidate
- Mike Rawlings – Former CEO of Pizza Hut and former Dallas Parks and Recreation Board President

== Summary ==
On January 16, 2011, Mayor Tom Leppert announced that he would not run for reelection. Republican City Councilman Ron Natinsky was the first major candidate to announce his candidacy, on January 19, 2011. Democratic former Police Chief David Kunkle announced his candidacy on January 31, 2011. Democratic former CEO of Pizza Hut Mike Rawlings was the last major candidate to announce his candidacy, on February 11, 2011. Republican Edward Okpa entered the race last around the filing period. For the general elections, Rawlings raised over $1.5 million, while Natinsky raised about $400,000, Kunkle raised just under $200,000, and Okpa raised just over $100,000. Rawlings was endorsed by former Dallas Cowboys quarterback Roger Staubach, former Dallas Mayor Ron Kirk as well as city council members Tennell Atkins, Vonciel Jones Hill, and Carolyn Davis. Kunkle was endorsed by former Dallas Mayor Laura Miller. Natinsky was endorsed by acting mayor and councilman Dwaine Caraway, and council members Jerry Allen, Delia Jasso, Sheffie Kadane, Linda Koop, and Dave Neumann.

The runoff between Rawlings and Kunkle ensured that Dallas' mayor would be a Democrat after Republican Tom Leppert had run city hall for four years. During the runoff, Rawlings continued to dominate in fund-raising as he had in the general election. Rawlings was endorsed by both defeated general election candidates – Ron Natinsky and Edward Okpa. Rawlings was also endorsed by several council members who had originally backed Natinsky, such as Jerry Allen, Delia Jasso, Sheffie Kadane, and Linda Koop as well as Ann Margolin, Pauline Medrano, and Steve Salazar, who all three had stayed neutral in the original general election.

== Results ==
=== General election ===
Dallas mayoral election – May 14, 2011
Party	Candidate	Votes	%	±%
Nonpartisan	Mike Rawlings √	28,424	40.86%	
Nonpartisan candidate	David Kunkle √	22,229	31.96%	
Nonpartisan candidate	Ron Natinsky	17,430	25.06%	
Nonpartisan candidate	Edward Okpa	1,474	2.12%	

=== Runoff results ===
Dallas mayoral election runoff – June 18, 2011
Party	Candidate	Votes	%	±%
Nonpartisan	Mike Rawlings √	31,088	55.80%	
Nonpartisan	David Kunkle	24,623	44.20%	
