= City Bank =

City Bank or city bank may refer to:

- The public bank of a municipal government
- City Bank (Bangladesh), a Bangladeshi private commercial bank
- City bank (Japan), a term used to describe the mega banks in Japan
- City Bank of Montreal (1833–1876)
- Citibank, a U.S. based bank formerly known as the City Bank of New York
- Siam City Bank (1941–2010), a Thai bank
- City Bank building, a building in Australia
- Taipei City Bank F.C.

== See also ==
- City Bank Stadium
- City Bank Tower
- National City Bank (disambiguation)
