= Forney High School =

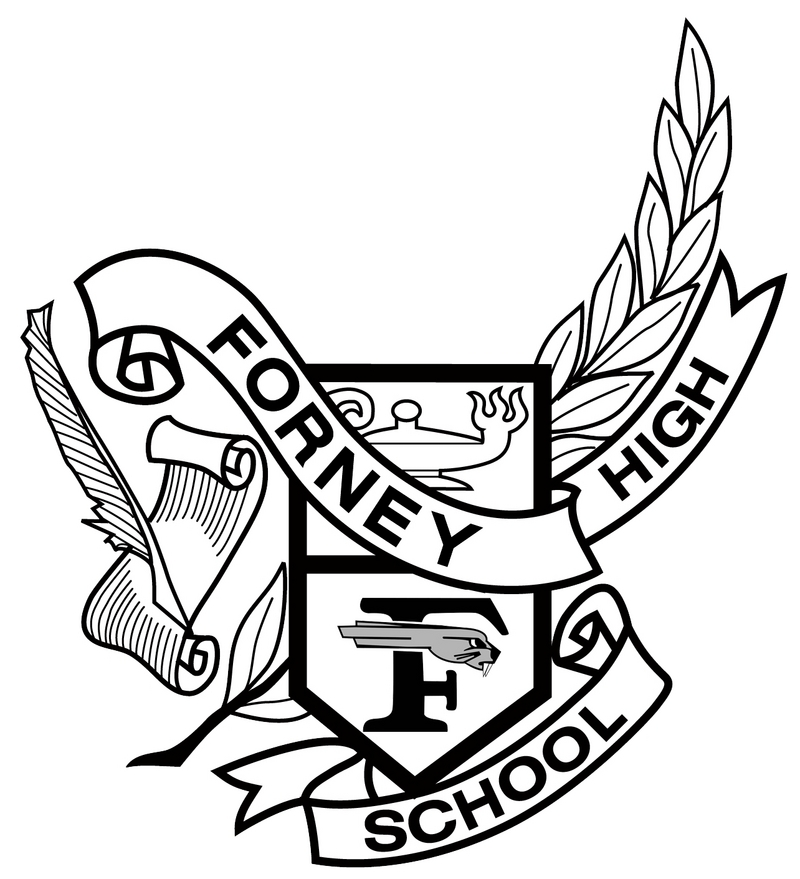

Location
- 1800 College Ave; Forney, Texas 75126-9574; United States; 32°43′32″N 96°27′22″W

Information
- School type: Public high school
- School district: Forney Independent School District
- NCES School ID: 481956001810
- Principal: Dr. Justin James
- Faculty: 130.15 (FTE)
- Grades: 9–12
- Enrollment: 2,351 (2023–2024)
- Student to teacher ratio: 18.06
- Colors: Black and gold
- Athletics conference: UIL Class AAAAAA
- Nickname: Jackrabbits
- Newspaper: The Advocate
- Website: Forney High School website

City Bank Stadium in Forney

Forney High School is a public secondary school located in Forney, Texas, United States. It is one of two high schools in the Forney Independent School District which serves Forney, Talty, the small Kaufman County portion of Mesquite, and some surrounding unincorporated areas of Kaufman County. Because of immense growth in the early 2000s, a bond was approved to begin construction of a second high school in May 2007. US Highway 80 serves as the boundary between the two high schools. Beginning in 2009, North Forney High School only housed freshmen and sophomores and the first graduating class was in 2012. In 2024-2025, the school was rated by the Texas Education Agency as follows: 85 (B) overall, 84 (B) for Student Achievement, 81 (B) for School Progress, 62 (D) for Academic Growth, 81 (B) for Relative Performance, and 87 (B) for Closing the Gaps.

== Activities ==
Forney High School has several award-winning organizations including track and field, powerlifting, football, drill team, UIL academic teams, Special Olympics teams, band, and choir, which compete in the UIL 6A division. City Bank Stadium is one of the few high school football stadiums in the country with privately owned naming rights. FHS varsity football, soccer, and track compete in the stadium. The school won its first state championship in history in June 2018 when the softball team defeated Richmond Foster 4-1.

Forney Independent School District's very first AFJROTC unit was established on August 27, 2008. It was a mutual agreement between Forney ISD and The United States Air Force. Their mission statement is to, "Develop citizens of character" and their motto is "One Team. One Unit. One Family. HUA!"

In 2014, Forney High School was recognized as having a certified Project Lead the Way high school engineering program.

== Recent Events ==
On January 3, 2024 Forney High School and North Forney High School both welcomed freshmen to their brand new 9th grade centers (aka The Freshmen Center). Built on the same property as the high school these new centers make it a smoother transition for new freshmen to enter their new school. As well as making it smoother it also allows freshmen to participate in the schools sports unlike other districts whose 9th grade centers are off-site.

== School uniforms ==
All Forney ISD students are required to wear school uniforms, although jeans are sometimes allowed.

The Texas Education Agency specified that the parental guardians of students zoned to a school with uniforms may apply for a waiver to opt out of the uniform policy. Parents must provide legitimate reasons, which are usually religious or philosophical in nature.

Forney High School has opt-out days periodically throughout the course of the year to celebrate special occasions such as home game days.

== Notable alumni ==
- Javian Osborne (Class of 2026) college football running back for Notre Dame Fighting Irish football
- Aaron Flowers (Class of 2024), college football safety for the Oregon Ducks
- Caleb Hanie (Class of 2004), NFL quarterback, Chicago Bears (08-09), Denver Broncos (2012), Baltimore Ravens (2013), Cleveland Browns (2013)
- Jaylon Hutchings (Class of 2018), professional football defensive tackle
- John Wiley Price (Class of 1968), first African-American Dallas County Commissioner
- Don Willett (Class of 1984), justice of the Texas Supreme Court
