= Aaron Flowers =

American football player (born 2006)

No. 21 – Oregon Ducks
- Position: Safety
- Class: Redshirt Sophomore

Personal information
- Born: April 4, 2006 (age 20)
- Listed height: 6 ft 0 in (1.83 m)
- Listed weight: 208 lb (94 kg)

Career information
- High school: Forney (Forney, Texas)
- College: Oregon (2024–present)
- Stats at ESPN

Aaron Flowers (born April 4, 2006) is an American football safety for the Oregon Ducks.

== Early life ==
Flowers attended Forney High School in Forney, Texas. He had 51 tackles and two interceptions his junior year and 73 tackles and seven interceptions his senior year. Flowers was selected to play in the 2024 All-American Bowl. He committed to the University of Oregon to play college football.

== College career ==
Flowers redshirted his first year at Oregon in 2024 after playing in two games. He entered his redshirt freshman season in 2025 as a starter. Against Rutgers, he recorded his first career interception.

== Personal life ==
Flowers' younger brother, Benji Flowers, is a professional soccer player for Major League Soccer club FC Dallas.
