= Tom Leppert =

American businessman

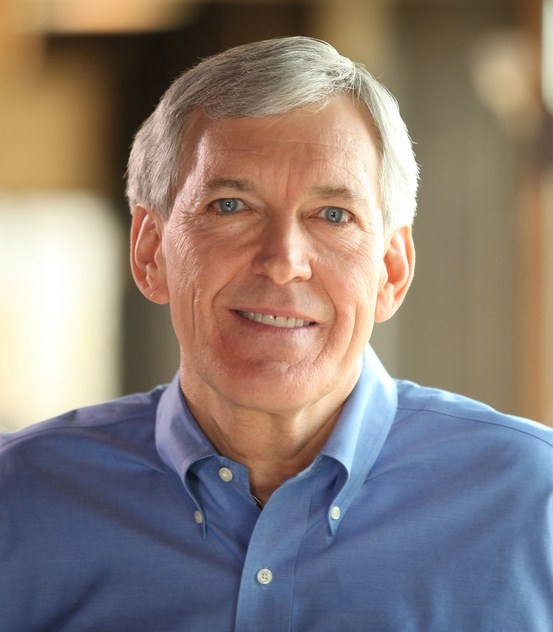

58th Mayor of Dallas
- In office June 25, 2007 – February 25, 2011
- Preceded by: Laura Miller
- Succeeded by: Dwaine Caraway

Personal details
- Born: Thomas Chris Leppert; June 15, 1954 (age 72) New York City, U.S.
- Party: Republican
- Spouse: Laura Leppert
- Children: 3
- Education: Claremont McKenna College (BA); Harvard University (MBA)

Thomas Chris Leppert (born June 15, 1954) is an American businessman and former politician who is the former CEO of Kaplan, Inc., one of the world's largest education providers. He had oversight of the company's operating divisions (Kaplan Test Prep and Kaplan Higher Education in the United States, and Kaplan International) until his resignation was announced in July 2015. Leppert, a member of the Republican Party, previously served as the 58th mayor of Dallas, Texas from 2007 to 2011 and was unsuccessful candidate for the U.S. Senate in 2012.

Leppert worked as CEO of the Turner Corporation prior to his election as mayor of Dallas in 2007. As of 2023, Leppert was the last Republican to be elected Mayor of Dallas, although the city's current mayor, Eric Johnson, who was elected as a Democrat became a Republican in 2023. He did not run for a second term as mayor and instead sought the Republican nomination in the 2012 United States Senate election in Texas. He placed third in the primary behind Ted Cruz and David Dewhurst.

== Early life, education, and early career ==
Leppert is a graduate of Claremont McKenna College, where he earned a Bachelor's Degree in economics with cum laude honors in 1977 and served as Student Body President. He then went on to attend Harvard Business School, where he received a M.B.A. with Distinction in 1979.

Leppert served as a White House Fellow in the Reagan Administration in 1984 and 1985. He was one of 13 fellows chosen from 1,247 applicants by President Ronald Reagan in 1984. During his fellowship, Leppert worked for the secretary of the Treasury and on the White House staff.

On May 17, 2008, Leppert received an honorary doctorate from his undergraduate alma mater, Claremont McKenna College, for which he serves as a trustee. Leppert told graduates to "know your principles" and encouraged them to write them down. "This may sound simple and obvious, but over the course of a lifetime, it may be one of the most difficult promises you ever keep. I know I am confronted by this each and every day. Simply stated, using generic terms like honesty and integrity are not near enough[...] People rarely get in trouble or lose their compass in one fell swoop... it is a series of small compromises, missteps that lead to a landslide... and a lost sense of self." In the same speech, Leppert called his visit to Auschwitz a "single day [that] changed the way I looked at the world."

Leppert is a member of First Baptist Church Dallas and was formerly a member of the Dallas Country Club (prior to resigning in December 2006 due to his concern that the club's tradition of refusing membership to black applicants could become an issue during the mayoral campaign). He and his wife Laura have two sons and a daughter. Leppert grew up in Phoenix, Arizona. Leppert was a member of the youth leadership organization DeMolay International and rose up the ranks of Arizona DeMolay to become State Master Councilor (State President) in 1972–1973. He was inducted into the DeMolay International Hall of Fame in 2010. He attended college at Harvard University, where upon graduation in 1979, worked in Los Angeles, Washington, DC, and New York City before moving to Dallas between 1986 and 1989; in 1989, he moved to Honolulu, where he resided until 1999 (when he became CEO of the Turner Corporation). Upon joining Turner, he relocated to the Park Cities (an affluent suburb of Dallas) and moved the holding company's headquarters to Dallas. He moved to Dallas in 2003.

== Business career ==
Leppert was chairman and CEO of the Turner Corporation (a subsidiary of German construction company Hochtief AG) prior to being elected mayor of Dallas. Turner Construction Company (a subsidiary of Turner Corp.) is currently the largest commercial builder in the United States. Leppert credits himself with earning more profits for the company during his seven-year tenure than in the company's previous 97 years combined, and moving a related holding company headquarters (employing 15 people, including Leppert) from New York City to Dallas; Turner Construction continues to be headquartered in New York.

During his career, Leppert also held positions at McKinsey & Co., Trammell Crow Company, Bank of Hawaii, and Castle & Cooke Properties, Inc.

Leppert was elected to the Board of Directors of Washington Mutual (at the time, the largest savings and loan association in the United States) in 2005; as part of his election, he was also named to the Board of Directors' Governance and Audit committees. During Leppert's time on the Board of Directors, Washington Mutual collapsed — the largest bank failure in American financial history.

Leppert became President and Chief Operating Officer of Kaplan, Inc. in January 2013, assuming day-to-day oversight of the company's operating divisions: Kaplan Test Prep and Kaplan Higher Education in the United States, and Kaplan International, with operations across Europe, Asia, and Australia. In April 2014, Leppert became CEO of Kaplan, Inc.

=== Awards ===
Leppert received the Torch of Conscience award from the Dallas-based Southwest region of the American Jewish Congress in 2006, the Russell H. Perry Free Enterprise Award from Dallas Baptist University for achievement in free enterprise and service to the community in 2009, and the Distinguished Business Leader award from the Dallas chapter of the Texas Association of Business in 2010. He was also named a 2007 "Business Person of the Year" finalist by the Dallas Business Journal, and "CEO Of The Year" by D Magazine in 2008. Inducted into the DeMolay International Hall of Fame in 2010.

== Mayor of Dallas ==
Leppert defeated city councilman Ed Oakley in a runoff election June 16, 2007, winning with 58 percent of the vote. Some attribute his win to unexpected support from leaders within the African American community of the traditionally Democratic southern section of the city and his appeal to Republicans.

While the office of mayor is officially non-partisan, like all municipal offices in Texas, Leppert is a Republican who participates in party fundraising events.

After his first year in office, Leppert's runoff election opponent (Oakley) praised him for his leadership and for delivering on his campaign promises: "There's no question: Tom's done an excellent job. He's delivered on his priorities." Shortly before Leppert's resignation, however, Oakley had second thoughts and publicly wondered whether Leppert was more interested in his own advancement than the city's.

=== Political positions and actions ===
In his inaugural address, Leppert stated that his first order of business would be to "reach out to everybody [and] include everybody from everywhere" and he emphasized a need to change the City Council's tone, stating: "rather than punishing business, City Hall needs to start promoting business." As he did during the mayoral campaign, Leppert made education a theme of his inaugural address, proclaiming: "when a big issue like underperforming schools is holding back an entire city and hindering our growth, then it is everyone's problem." With respect to crime, he said the council must use two objectives by which to judge its crime-fighting performance: lowering Dallas' typically high crime-rate ranking among the nation's largest cities, and building confidence and trust in all Dallas neighborhoods for police and fire personnel. Finally, he firmly restated his commitment to enact the Trinity River Corridor plan, calling the project "a once-in-a-generation opportunity, and it will be the catalyst that puts Dallas on the world stage, if we seize the moment and get it done."

Two years into his term, Leppert had won support from a core coalition of Dallas City Council members (Dwaine Caraway, Dave Neumann, and Ron Natinsky), who voted with Leppert more than 92 percent of the time, a rate roughly equal to his record of being on the winning side of council roll call votes. Indeed, Caraway even went so far as to declare that he "would take a bullet" for the Mayor during a heated debate over the Trinity River Project.

Leppert donated his mayoral salary to a scholarship fund for students from low-income families.

In his campaign for Texas Senator in 2012, Leppert ran ads that characterized his opponents as "empty suits".

==== Crime reduction ====
Leppert ran on the pledge of reducing crime and increasing the number of police officers in the city of Dallas. He helped add 200 new police officers to the city's ranks, which coincided with a drop in crime rates each year Leppert was in office—including a 10% reduction in 2010.

==== Economic development and jobs ====
In January 2008, Mayor Leppert embarked on a trade mission to Monterrey, Mexico, to promote Dallas's medical, educational, and corporate institutions. Another part of the trip's agenda was to lobby on behalf of an inland seaport in the Dallas area. Leppert was joined by more than a dozen officials from city government, the Dallas Independent School District and various health care and commercial institutions in the largest mission of its kind in years. One of the agreements reached on the trip include a plan for an MD/PhD program in Mexico provided by UT Southwestern Medical School. Leppert also stated that Mexican President Felipe Calderón would be visiting Dallas on his next visit to the United States.

Following his trip to Mexico, Leppert led a trade mission to China and signed "friendship city" agreements with major industrial cities such as Dalian and Qingdao. Leppert also oversaw the negotiation of business deals with Chinese officials, such as advocacy of investment in the Dallas Inland Port and the placement of a Chinese telecommunication firm's U.S. headquarters in Dallas.

Leppert is also credited with persuading AT&T to relocate to Dallas as well as encouraging the start-up of a new $15 million call center that plans to ultimately employ 300 workers.

==== Convention center hotel ====
In December 2008, Leppert began lobbying the Obama administration for $386 million in Community Development Block Grant funds to be awarded by the federal government for the purpose of building a new convention center hotel in downtown Dallas (a project that had been on Dallas' drawing board for nearly two decades), stating: "Let's use this as an opportunity. Most of the economy in the country is in metro areas. Let's make sure we use this (stimulus) money much as we did back in the 1930s, so that when we come out we have a much stronger economy and we're in a much better position."

Following the federal government's failure to approve Leppert's request for stimulus funds, in February 2009 he announced plans to seek an alternate form of financing. He argued that if Dallas did not build the hotel, it would fall further behind other cities in the competition for convention and tourism business, and that larger conventions would not even consider Dallas because it does not have a hotel attached to its convention center. He also argued that, because it would attract more visitors to Dallas, the building of the hotel would lead to a broadening of Dallas' tax base and an increase in jobs and sales tax revenue to the city. In May 2009, he successfully lobbied the City Council to approve spending $42 million to purchase land on which the proposed hotel would be located.

The project was financed with $388.2 million in federally-subsidized revenue bonds issued under the Obama administration's Build America Bonds program (which means that the federal government reimburses the city 35% of the interest associated with the issue) and $91.7 million in conventional hotel revenue bonds ($479.9 million total). Repayment is anticipated to come from a combination of $249.1 million in direct subsidies from the federal government (associated with the Build America Bonds), $212.9 million in pledged state and city occupancy and sales taxes associated with the property's operation, and the remainder from hotel net operating income. In addition, the bonds are further backed by a "Moral Obligation Pledge" from the City of Dallas to cover any shortfalls. The hotel broke ground in 2009 and is projected to open in 2012.

In an effort to reinforce the success of the hotel, Leppert led the City Council to lobby Dallas Area Rapid Transit (DART) to change the alignment of a proposed light rail line through downtown; under Leppert's plan, the line would be diverted from the center of downtown to stop at the hotel and would include a subway segment that would travel beneath the convention center to an underground station at City Hall before rejoining the original alignment. DART staff, however, reported that, at $824 million, the proposed realignment would be more expensive than all other options being considered, exceeding the cost of the cheapest alignment by $315 million. They also pointed out that the Federal Transit Administration makes the final call on where the route should go, and the hotel alignment had been shown to attract fewer riders, at higher costs, than other options. Nevertheless, Leppert continued to serve as a strong advocate for the realignment, stating: "The hotel alignment serves downtown's transportation needs and supports the public and private investment in our city's core."

==== Education ====
On February 21, 2008, Leppert unveiled The Every Child Ready to Read @ Dallas program. This program was part of Leppert's larger plan to improve Dallas's education system which was unveiled in 2007.

==== Ethics and open government ====
In December 2007, Leppert released his ethics plan that would ban city council members from accepting free tickets to events, and modernize the city's campaign finance disclosure system by creating a searchable, online campaign finance database and requiring electronic filing of campaign finance reports for political candidates in the city. In March 2008, the city council approved Leppert's electronic campaign finance filing system proposal.

In November 2009, the city council passed a series of four ethics reforms championed by Leppert that:

- Required lobbyists to register with the city
- Limited campaign contributions from developers
- Required disclosure of gifts to council members over $50
- Required two city council members to "second" major zoning cases and certify they have reviewed the details of the zoning case before the matter can be voted on

===== Love Field no-bid concessions contract extensions =====
Leppert ignited a controversy when he opposed no-bid concessions contract extensions with current Love Field food vendor Star Concessions Ltd. and newspaper and book vendor Hudson Retail Dallas during a March 3, 2010, city council meeting. Leppert insisted that the contracts should be opened to public bidding instead. Leppert demanded that city staff—who backed the extensions—appear before the full council and explain why the concessions contracts were not opened to public bidding.

On February 22, 2010, the city council's Transportation and Environment Committee had previously voted to extend contracts with the existing concessions for through 2026 with an additional 3-year option and exclusive rights to 54 percent of vending space in a new terminal scheduled to open in 2014, instead of opening the contract up to public bidding

In an April 26, 2010, editorial, The Dallas Morning News called the lack of transparency and fiduciary responsibility "troubling". The Dallas Morning News noted that the situation was complicated by the fact that the concessions operators were partially owned by two elected officials—State Representative Helen Giddings and U.S. Representative Eddie Bernice Johnson.

On May 21, 2010, The Dallas Morning News reported that Assistant City Manager A.C. Gonzalez said that city staff recommended in June 2007 that all concession space in the renovated airport be opened up for competitive bids, but that plan was opposed by city council members. On June 9, 2010, The Dallas Morning News reported that airport consultants said that the no-bid plan was unusual and could result in an inferior deal for the city. According to a June 17, 2010 article in the Dallas Observer, Gilbert Aranza—owner of Star Concessions Ltd.—accused Leppert of hypocrisy given his support for similar no-bid contract extensions during his tenure on the D/FW Airport Board.

In an apparent victory for Leppert, the city council voted on August 18, 2010, to open all concessions space in the new terminal for public bidding; city staff would attempt to reach a deal with Star and Hudson to operate existing concessions space from 2011 to 2014, otherwise it would also be opened for public bidding.

==== Property tax rate increases ====
During candidate Leppert's 2007 mayoral campaign, he ran a television commercial featuring Dallas Cowboys legend Roger Staubach telling Dallasites, "I hope you'll say 'no' to new taxes by saying 'yes' to Tom Leppert." However, in September of that year he voted with the majority of the Dallas City Council in a successful push to raise taxes, hailing the budget as a good deal for Dallas residents, balancing a modest tax increase against a bevy of improved city services.

In subsequent years, however, Leppert opposed property tax rate increases in the city of Dallas and proposed spending cuts to balance the budget.

In 2008, despite early calls for another property tax rate increase, Leppert successfully led opposition to prevent another rate increase. Leppert also successfully led opposition to another proposal to increase property tax rates in 2009.

In 2010, once again, Leppert led the opposition of yet another property tax rate increase proposal. In response to the estimated $130 million shortfall in the city's $2 billion budget, Leppert crafted a new budget proposal to close the budget gap without increasing taxes. Despite Leppert's strong objections, the city council voted by an 8-7 majority to pass a 6.5% property tax rate increase anyway—the largest in 20 years.

=== Electoral history ===
After receiving a plurality of votes among a crowded field of candidates in the 2007 Dallas Mayoral Election, Leppert won a spot in a runoff election along with Dallas City Council member Ed Oakley. Leppert was victorious in the runoff election.

General election for Mayor of the City of Dallas, Texas, 2007:
Party	Candidate	Votes	%
Nonpartisan politician	Tom Leppert	19,367	27.10%
Nonpartisan politician	Ed Oakley	14,754	20.64%
Nonpartisan	Don Hill	9,896	13.85%
Nonpartisan	Max Wells	8,697	12.17%
Nonpartisan	Gary Griffith	6,656	9.31%
Nonpartisan	Sam Coats	5,473	7.66%
Nonpartisan	Darrell Jordan	4,062	5.68%
Nonpartisan	Other/Write-In	2,562	0.14%
Total votes		71,467	100.00%

Runoff election for Mayor of the City of Dallas, Texas, 2007:
Party	Candidate	Votes	%
Nonpartisan politician	Tom Leppert	49,558	57.83%
Nonpartisan	Ed Oakley	36,135	42.17%
Total votes		85,693	100.00%

== Post-mayoral career ==
In late 2008, it was widely rumored that Leppert would run in a potential special election for Kay Bailey Hutchison's United States Senate seat, which she was widely expected to vacate during her run for Texas governor; in a December newspaper interview, Leppert denied he had started to campaign, but he refused to entirely rule out the possibility. However, Hutchison retained her Senate seat, and her gubernatorial campaign ended when she lost the 2010 Texas Republican primary to incumbent Rick Perry.

Rumors soon circulated that Leppert was considering a Senate run directly against Hutchison in 2012, a possibility he did not refute during an April 2010, interview.

In January 2011, Leppert announced that he would not seek re-election to the office of mayor in May. This further fueled speculation that he was planning a run for the now open U.S. Senate seat being vacated by Hutchison.

On February 22, 2011, it was reported that Leppert would announce his resignation from the office of mayor the next day. The Washington Post noted that this is a necessary first step for his expected run for Senate because Dallas law prohibits the mayor from running for another office while still serving as mayor.

Leppert resigned his seat as mayor effective at midnight on February 25, 2011. He told The Dallas Morning News that his campaign for the U.S. Senate would begin immediately, with Mike Slanker, former political director of the National Republican Senatorial Committee, acting as his chief campaign consultant.

Leppert was eliminated from the U.S. Senate race after finishing third in the May 29, 2012 Republican primary election, earning 13.3% of the votes cast. Former Texas Solicitor General Ted Cruz eventually won the 2012 Republican nomination for the open Senate seat, defeating Lt. Governor David Dewhurst in the Republican primary runoff by 57% to 43% on July 31, 2012.

During a campaign rally in Fort Worth, Leppert endorsed Donald Trump in the 2016 Republican Presidential Primary.

Political offices
Preceded by Laura Miller	Mayor of Dallas; 2007–2011	Succeeded by Dwaine Caraway
