= City Bank Stadium =

Stadium in Forney, Texas, US

- Interactive map of City Bank Stadium
- Former names: None
- Location: 800 FM 741 S Forney, Texas 75126
- Coordinates: 32.7238°N 96.4589°W
- Owner: Forney ISD
- Operator: Forney ISD
- Capacity: 8,500
- Surface: Tiger Turf

Construction
- Opened: 2003
- Cost: $13 million est.

Tenants
- Forney High School and North Forney High School Athletics

City Bank Stadium is the home stadium of the Forney Jackrabbits and is located on the campus of Forney High School. It is primarily used by the FHS football, soccer and track teams.

The first game played in City Bank Stadium was a football game pitting the Forney Jackrabbits against the Mesquite Horn Jaguars in which the Jackrabbits were soundly defeated. (Mesquite Horn 31, Forney 10). Former NFL quarterback Caleb Hanie played for Forney in the game.

Until 2004, only Varsity Football and track teams were allowed to use the stadium. In 2004 upon insistence from parents and coaches, the varsity soccer teams were allowed to play at the stadium. City Bank Stadium is a turf surface.

Stadium Upgrades

Several upgrades were made prior to the 2004 season. The visitor stands were extended to the length of the field and concession stands, restrooms, and a locker room were added. On the home side, a concession stand was added at the south end to be used for the baseball and softball fields once they are completed. Support beams were also added on both the north and south ends of the home side.

Artificial turf will be installed during summer of 2007. This upgrade was approved in the May 2007 school bond election.

"Tiger turf" was installed during summer 2007.

In Summer 2009, the north endzone was replaced with "Falcons" to represent Forney ISD's new school North Forney. In summer 2011 the entire field was replaced at no charge after problems with areas of it coming loose.

The scoreboard was replaced in 2019. It is capable of showing video versus just graphics on the old board.

Notable Games

Forney 49 v. Wills Point 0 - 2003 bi-district playoffs - First playoff game at the stadium was a bi-district match up between Forney and Wills Point. Forney won the game 49-0. Since then City Bank Stadium has been a popular site for surround teams to play in.

Unity Bowl

Each year since 2012 and the opening of North Forney HS, a 2nd high school in Forney, TX, the teams have played a cross-town football game titled the Unity Bowl.

Forney 24 v. North Forney 14 - 2012 Unity Bowl - The first annual "Unity Bowl" against cross town rivals. Forney scored 14 straight points to win the game.

Forney 27 v. North Forney 17 - 2013 Unity Bowl - Forney scored 21 straight points to defeat North Forney.

Forney 48 v. North Forney 0 - 2014 Unity Bowl - Forney absolutely destroyed the Falcons throughout the game.

Forney 59 v. North Forney 28 - 2015 Unity Bowl

Forney 37 v. North Forney 19 - 2016 Unity Bowl

North Forney 49 v. Forney 19 - 2017 Unity Bowl - North Forney gets their first Unity Bowl Win, and in a big way.

Forney 39 v. North Forney 35 - 2018 Unity Bowl - Tight and hard fought game by both teams

North Forney 57 v. Forney 10 - 2019 Unity Bowl - North Forney takes the trophy back.

North Forney 61 v. Forney 21 - 2020 Unity Bowl - North Forney absolutely destroyed the Jackrabbits throughout the game.

Forney 15 v. North Forney 7 - 2021 Unity Bowl - Forney once again shows little brother who is boss.
