= Mike Rawlings =

Former mayor of Dallas, Texas, United States

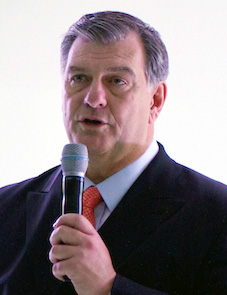

59th Mayor of Dallas
- In office June 27, 2011 – June 17, 2019
- Preceded by: Dwaine Caraway (Acting)
- Succeeded by: Eric Johnson

Personal details
- Born: Michael Scott Rawlings; August 25, 1954 (age 72) Borger, Texas, U.S.
- Party: Democratic
- Spouse: Micki Rawlings
- Children: 2
- Education: Boston College (BA)

Michael Scott Rawlings (born August 25, 1954) is an American businessman and politician who was the 59th Mayor of Dallas, Texas. A member of the Democratic Party, he won the nonpartisan 2011 Dallas mayoral election defeating former Dallas Police Chief David Kunkle. He was reelected in 2015 by defeating Dallas lawyer Marcos Ronquillo.

Rawlings was CEO of Pizza Hut from 1997 to 2002, and CEO of the Tracy-Locke ad agency. In addition to his work in the city, Rawlings is also a prominent opponent of domestic violence, speaking at many events, including a Ring The Bell event at the United Nations alongside actor Patrick Stewart.

Rawlings garnered national attention during the Ebola outbreak, the July 7th, 2016, ambush on Dallas police officers, and a dispute over the Dallas Police and Fire Pension System. On the question of Confederate Statue Removal, Rawlings stated in August 2017 that Confederate statues in Dallas city parks are "monuments of propaganda" and called for a task force to decide what should be done with them. Rawlings pushed for the removal of a Robert E. Lee statue in a city park.

At the 2018 Conference of Mayors, Rawlings, who was known as a supporter of the arts in Dallas, received the 2018 National Award for Local Arts from the United States Conference of Mayors and Americans for the Arts in Washington, DC.

== Electoral history ==
=== 2011 Dallas mayoral election ===
==== Initial Election ====
Candidate	Vote number	Vote percentage
Mike Rawlings	28,424	40.86%
David Kunkle	22,229	31.96%
Ron Natinsky	17,430	25.06%
E. Edward Okpa, II	1,474	2.12%

==== Runoff Election ====
Candidate	Vote number	Vote percentage
Mike Rawlings	31,088	55.80%
David Kunkle	24,623	44.20%

=== 2015 Dallas mayoral election ===
Candidate	Vote number	Vote percentage
Mike Rawlings	30,703	72.55%
Marcos Ronquillo	11,384	26.90%
write-ins	235	0.56%

Political offices
Preceded by Dwaine Caraway; Acting	Mayor of Dallas; 2011–2019	Succeeded by Eric Johnson
