= Forney Independent School District =

School district in Texas, United States

Location
- 600 S. Bois d' Arc Street; Forney, Texas 75126 USA
- Coordinates: 32°44′38″N 96°28′35″W

District information
- Type: Public
- Grades: Pre-K through 12
- Established: 1897
- Superintendent: Dr. Justin Terry

Students and staff
- Students: 18,500

Other information
- Website: Forney ISD

The Forney Independent School District is a public school district in Kaufman County, based in Forney, Texas, United States.

The district serves the city of Forney, the city of Talty, a small portion of Mesquite, and other unincorporated areas in Kaufman County.

For the 2024-2025 school year, the district was rated by the Texas Education Agency as follows: 79 (C) overall, 79 (C) for Student Achievement, 75 (C) for School Progress, and 79 (C) for Closing the Gaps.

== Leadership ==
Dr. Justin Terry was named the superintendent of Forney ISD in 2018 after previously serving as the deputy superintendent for four years. In 2024, Dr. Terry was named the Region 10 Superintendent of the Year.

== Fast Growth ==
Kaufman County is the fastest-growing county in the state and the second fastest-growing county in the country, according to data released from the United States Census Bureau in 2025.

As of 2025, the district has 18,500 students, but is expected to grow to more than 35,000 students in the next 10 years.

While building facilities through the November 2019 bond, Forney ISD saved millions in construction costs, allowing for an additional elementary school (Dewberry Elementary) to be included. This adds much needed additional capacity for students.

== Opportunity Central ==
The Keith Bell Opportunity Central, or The OC, opened in 2023 as a multipurpose campus serving career development, access to higher education and community engagement opportunities for all.

The OC serves as an extension of the traditional classroom. Students in grades 10th-12th travel to the OC to take classes and get real-world experience from business partners.

The center operates seven days a week to accommodate businesses, community events and entertainment. The OC provides career-focused programs, college courses, and a variety of businesses and eateries open to the community for high school students to gain real-world experiences and employment opportunities. The OC includes a 600-seat theater, a 7,500-seat arena space for tournaments, concerts and events, and so much more.

The Keith Bell Opportunity Central (OC) won four “Stars of Distinction” for Design, Planning, Community, and Transformation at the 2024 TASA/TASB Exhibit of School Architecture. The facility, designed by Huckabee, was also selected as a Caudill Award winner in the 2024-2025 Exhibit of School Architecture competition facilitated by the Texas Association of School Administrators (TASA) and Texas Association of School Boards (TASB).

== Academies ==
Starting in the 2025-2026 school year, Forney ISD is expanding its choice academies to offer more opportunities for students to explore their interests and passions. These academies are designed to ignite student engagement, fostering personal growth and academic success. By tailoring academies around specific areas of interest, students have the chance to dive deep into what excites them, while preparing them for a successful high school experience and beyond. This innovative approach helps students stay motivated and on track for their future.

- Theater Academy (5th-6th grade) at The OC
- Entrepreneurship & Global Leadership Academy (4th-7th grade) at The OC
- Swim Academy (4th-7th grade) at The OC
- Golf Academy (4th-7th grade) at The OC
- Coding & Robotics Academy (4th-7th grade) at The OC
- Virtual Academy
- Dual Language Academy (K-4th grade at Wilson, 5th-6th grade at Jones)
- Advanced Academics & Fine Arts Academy (K-4th grade) at Blackburn
- Fine Arts Academy (5th-6th grade) at Smith and Rhea

== Schools ==
=== High schools ===
- Forney High School
- North Forney High School

=== Middle schools ===
- Brown Middle School
- Jackson Middle School
- Themer Middle School
- Warren Middle School

=== Intermediate schools ===
- Jones Intermediate School
- Rhea Intermediate School
- Rhodes Intermediate School
- Smith Intermediate School

=== Primary schools ===
- Blackburn Elementary School
- Claybon Elementary School
- Criswell Elementary School
- Crosby Elementary School
- Dewberry Elementary School
- Early Childhood Center
- Griffin Elementary School
- Henderson Elementary School
- Jacob's Elementary School
- Johnson Elementary School
- Lewis Elementary School
- Willett Elementary School
- Wilson Elementary School

=== Alternative school ===
- Forney Learning Academy

== See also ==
- List of school districts in Texas
