= Barbara Mallory Caraway =

American politician (born 1956)

Member of the Texas House of Representatives from the 110th district
- In office January 9, 2007 – January 8, 2013
- Preceded by: Jesse Jones
- Succeeded by: Toni Rose

Member of the Dallas City Council from the 6th district
- In office 1993–2001
- Succeeded by: Ed Oakley

Personal details
- Born: May 8, 1956 (age 70) Clarksville, Texas, U.S.
- Party: Democratic
- Spouse: Dwaine Caraway
- Education: Texas Southern University (BA)

Barbara Mallory Caraway (born May 8, 1956) is an American politician who served as a member of the Texas House of Representatives for the 110th district from 2007 to 2013.

== Early life and education ==
Born in Clarksville, Texas, Caraway was raised in Amarillo, the fifth born of eight children. She earned a Bachelor of Arts degree in telecommunications and theatre from Texas Southern University.

== Career ==
Caraway served as a member of the Dallas City Council for the sixth district from 1993 until she was term limited in 2001.

Caraway was elected to the Texas House of Representatives on November 7, 2006. In November 2008, she was re-elected to a second term.

=== Congressional elections ===
Caraway lost Democratic primary runs for Texas's 30th congressional district against incumbent Congresswoman Eddie Bernice Johnson in 2012, 2014, 2016, 2018 and 2020. Her best result against Johnson came in 2014, when she received over 30% of the vote. She also ran to succeed Johnson in 2022, but finished 4th with 7.7% of the vote, her lowest placement and percentage of the vote in a primary.

Caraway again ran for the 30th congressional district in 2026 to succeed Jasmine Crockett, who instead ran for U.S. Senate. She was defeated by pastor Frederick Haynes III in the Democratic primary. Though she received only 23% of the vote, Caraway won 24,370 votes, more than any of her previous runs for the 30th district.

== Personal life ==
She is married to Dwaine Caraway, a Dallas City Council member and former acting mayor of Dallas. She has a stepdaughter and two granddaughters.

In January 2011, police were called to a domestic disturbance at the Caraway's Cedar Crest home. Dwaine said police were called to a scuffle between his friends, but it was later revealed he had called the police because his wife was chasing him with a kitchen knife. "Barbara has a chemical imbalance, I think," Dwaine told responding officers. "She sometimes can get into a fit of rage. It is not about infidelity. It is not about me hitting her. She is the smartest person in the world, but when she gets set off, everybody gets out the way. She just went a little bit too far tonight."

== Electoral history ==
2012 Texas's 30th congressional district Democratic Party primary results
| Party | Candidate | Votes | % |
|---|---|---|---|
| Democratic | Eddie Bernice Johnson (incumbent) | 23,346 | 70.1 |
| Democratic | Barbara Mallory Caraway | 5,996 | 18.0 |
| Democratic | Taj Clayton | 3,981 | 12.0 |
| Total votes | | 33,323 | 100.0 |

2014 Texas's 30th congressional district Democratic primary results
| Party | Candidate | Votes | % |
|---|---|---|---|
| Democratic | Eddie Bernice Johnson (incumbent) | 23,756 | 69.9 |
| Democratic | Barbara Mallory Caraway | 10,216 | 30.1 |
| Total votes | | 33,972 | 100.0 |

2016 Texas's 30th congressional district Democratic primary results
| Party | Candidate | Votes | % |
|---|---|---|---|
| Democratic | Eddie Bernice Johnson (incumbent) | 44,527 | 69.4 |
| Democratic | Barbara Mallory Caraway | 15,273 | 23.8 |
| Democratic | Brandon J. Vance | 4,339 | 6.8 |
| Total votes | | 64,139 | 100.0 |

2018 Texas's 30th congressional Democratic primary results
| Party | Candidate | Votes | % |
|---|---|---|---|
| Democratic | Eddie Bernice Johnson (incumbent) | 32,415 | 63.6 |
| Democratic | Barbara Mallory Caraway | 11,641 | 22.8 |
| Democratic | Eric Williams | 6,931 | 13.6 |
| Total votes | | 50,987 | 100.0 |

2020 Texas's 30th congressional district Democratic primary results
| Party | Candidate | Votes | % |
|---|---|---|---|
| Democratic | Eddie Bernice Johnson (incumbent) | 58,804 | 70.6 |
| Democratic | Shenita Cleveland | 11,358 | 13.6 |
| Democratic | Barbara Mallory Caraway | 10,452 | 12.6 |
| Democratic | Hasani Burton | 2,638 | 3.2 |
| Total votes | | 83,252 | 100.0 |

2022 Texas's 30th congressional district Democratic primary results
| Party | Candidate | Votes | % |
|---|---|---|---|
| Democratic | Jasmine Crockett | 26,798 | 48.5 |
| Democratic | Jane Hope Hamilton | 9,436 | 17.1 |
| Democratic | Keisha Williams-Lankford | 4,323 | 7.8 |
| Democratic | Barbara Mallory Caraway | 4,277 | 7.7 |
| Democratic | Abel Mulugheta | 3,284 | 5.9 |
| Democratic | Roy Williams | 2,746 | 5.0 |
| Democratic | Vonciel Hill | 1,886 | 3.4 |
| Democratic | Jessica Mason | 1,858 | 3.4 |
| Democratic | Arthur Dixon | 677 | 1.2 |
| Total votes | | 55,285 | 100.0 |

2026 Texas's 30th congressional district Democratic primary results
| Party | Candidate | Votes | % |
|---|---|---|---|
| Democratic | Frederick Haynes III | 76,701 | 72.6% |
| Democratic | Barbara Mallory Caraway | 24,370 | 23.1% |
| Democratic | Rodney LaBruce | 4,546 | 4.3% |
| Total votes | | 105,617 | 100% |
