= Bill Moody (judge) =

American politician and judge

William E. Moody has served as the presiding judge of the 34th District Court in El Paso since 1986.

== 2010 Election ==
Moody in October 2009 announced that he would seek the Democratic Party's nomination for the Texas Supreme Court. He intended to use a blimp to travel around the state and advertise his campaign.

== 2006 Election ==
Moody was the Democratic nominee for Place Two on the Supreme Court of Texas in the November 2006 general election. His opponent was the incumbent, Justice Don Willett. Moody sought to become the first El Pasoan to be elected to statewide office in Texas as well as the only Democrat on the Court, whose current membership is all Republican. In his campaign, he walked across Texas, which drew extensive press coverage. Moody was defeated in the general election.

=== Endorsements ===
Moody received the endorsements of the following Texas newspapers:

- The Amarillo Globe-News
- The Austin American-Statesman
- The Austin Chronicle
- The Daily Texan
- The Dallas Morning News
- The El Paso Times
- The Fort Worth Star-Telegram
- The Houston Chronicle
- The Lufkin Daily News
- The San Antonio Express-News
- The Victoria Advocate
- The Waco Tribune-Herald
- In addition, Moody was the favored candidate of Texas lawyers in a non-partisan poll conducted by the Texas State Bar.
