= Don Willett =

American federal judge (born 1966)

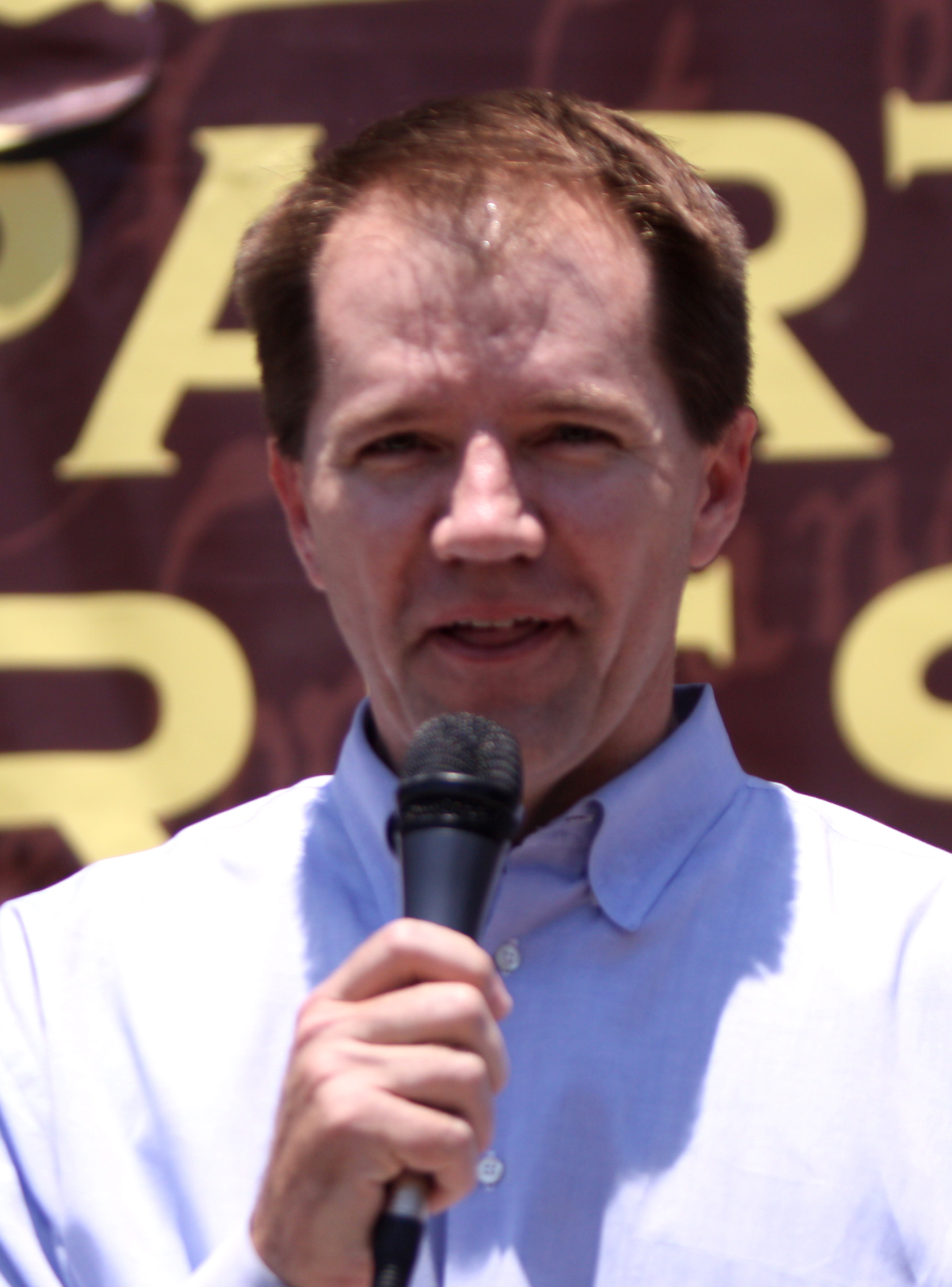

Judge of the United States Court of Appeals for the Fifth Circuit
- Incumbent
- Assumed office January 2, 2018
- Appointed by: Donald Trump
- Preceded by: Emilio M. Garza

Justice of the Texas Supreme Court
- In office August 24, 2005 – January 2, 2018
- Appointed by: Rick Perry
- Preceded by: Priscilla Owen
- Succeeded by: Jimmy Blacklock

Personal details
- Born: July 16, 1966 (age 60) Dallas, Texas, U.S.
- Party: Republican
- Spouse: Tiffany Willett
- Children: 3
- Education: Baylor University (BBA); Duke University (MA, JD, LLM)

Donny Ray Willett (born July 16, 1966) is an American lawyer and jurist serving since 2018 as a United States circuit judge of the United States Court of Appeals for the Fifth Circuit. He was previously a justice of the Supreme Court of Texas from 2005 to 2018.

== Early life and background ==
Willett was born on July 16, 1966, in Dallas, Texas. He grew up in Talty in Kaufman County. His adoptive father died at the age of 40, when Willett was six, and he and his older sister, Donna, were reared by their mother, Doris, who waited tables to support the family. Neither of Willett's parents finished high school. Willett attended public schools in Forney in Kaufman County, graduating in 1984. He then became his family's first college graduate.

Willett received a triple-major Bachelor of Business Administration (economics, finance, public administration) from Baylor University in 1988. While at Baylor, he was a member of the Baylor Chamber of Commerce. Willett then went to Duke University, where he jointly attended the Duke University School of Law and did graduate study in political science. He received a Juris Doctor with honors and a Master of Arts in political science in 1992. As a law student, he was an editor of Law & Contemporary Problems.

After law school, Willett worked as a clerk for Judge Jerre Stockton Williams at the United States Court of Appeals for the Fifth Circuit. He then practiced employment and labor law in the Austin office of Haynes and Boone, LLP from 1993 to 1996. During that time, he also served as a senior fellow with the Texas Public Policy Foundation. Willett has also served as a non-resident fellow with the Program for Research on Religion and Urban Civil Society at the University of Pennsylvania.

In April 1996, Willett joined then-Governor George W. Bush's administration as Director of Research and Special Projects, advising on various legal and policy issues. In 2000–2001, Willett worked on the Bush-Cheney presidential campaign and transition team. In the White House, Willett was Special Assistant to the President and Director of Law and Policy for the White House Office of Faith-Based and Community Initiatives (WHOFBCI). He drafted the first two executive orders of the Bush presidency, one creating the WHOFBCI and the other creating related offices in five cabinet agencies. In early 2002, Willett was appointed Deputy Assistant Attorney General for Office of Legal Policy at the United States Department of Justice, where he helped coordinate the selection and confirmation of federal judges. He also supervised policy initiatives such as the PROTECT Act of 2003 to combat child abduction and exploitation. Willett also led the development of an executive order to expedite U.S. citizenship for immigrant service members fighting in Iraq and Afghanistan.

He returned to Texas in early 2003 to become Deputy Texas Attorney General for Legal Counsel in the office of newly elected Texas Attorney General Greg Abbott. As the attorney general's chief legal counsel, Willett led the agency's core legal divisions (opinion committee, open records, general counsel, public finance, intergovernmental relations, and litigation technical support). In addition to giving the attorney general legal advice on various issues, Willett also helped with select litigation, including efforts to protect the Ten Commandments monument on the Texas Capitol grounds and also the Pledge of Allegiance when it was challenged for including the words "under God."

Willett was serving in this Deputy Attorney General position when he was appointed to the Texas Supreme Court in August 2005.

Willett sits on the advisory board for the Honors College at his alma mater, Baylor University, which named Willett a Distinguished Young Alumnus in 2005. He also served on the national steering committee for Baylor's proposal to secure the Bush Presidential Library. Willett is on the national advisory board for ConSource (The Constitutional Sources Project), a free, online library of U.S. founding-era source material. For Constitution Day 2008, Willett authored a commentary in the Austin American-Statesman highlighting ConSource and its nonprofit educational mission to make these historical documents accessible to teachers, students, academics, lawyers and judges. Willett is a fellow of the Texas Bar Foundation, the Austin Bar Foundation, and is a member of the American Law Institute.

== Texas Supreme Court ==
=== 2006 election ===
Willett was one of five incumbent justices on the 2006 ballot, but he was the only one who faced opposition; his four colleagues were unopposed in both the March 7 primary and the November 7 general elections. In the March primary, Willett narrowly defeated former Justice Steven Wayne Smith, who sought to regain the seat on the Court that he had lost in the 2004 Republican primary to Justice Paul Green. In the general election, Willett won 51% of the votes and defeated Democratic Party nominee Bill Moody, who got 45% (2.12 million votes to Moody's 1.87 million).

=== 2012 election ===
Willett defeated an intraparty challenge from Steve Smith in the May 29, 2012, Republican primary, but the contest attracted little attention. The publication Texas Conservative Review endorsed Willett and described the Smith campaign as "lackluster." The Review wrote that Smith seemed more intent in seeking "revenge for past losses than making a positive impact" on the high court.

In the general election, Willett received 4,758,725 votes (78.8 percent) to 1,280,900 votes (21.2 percent) for the Libertarian nominee, R. S. Roberto Koelsch.

According to SCOTUSblog, in the 2012 election "Willett embraced Twitter as a way to get his campaign message across, and Twitter embraced him back."

=== Tenure ===
Willett authored several notable decisions over the course of his service on the Texas high court, all of which can be found on the Court's official website and on Google Scholar. All Texas Supreme Court justices have liaison assignments to help improve different aspects of the civil justice system. Willett was liaison to the Texas Center for Legal Ethics and Professionalism, the Task Force to Ensure Judicial Readiness in Times of Emergency, and the Court Reporters Certification Board.

In May 2016, Willett appeared on presidential candidate Donald Trump's list of potential U.S. Supreme Court justices.

In 2016, Willett received a Master of Laws from Duke University School of Law.

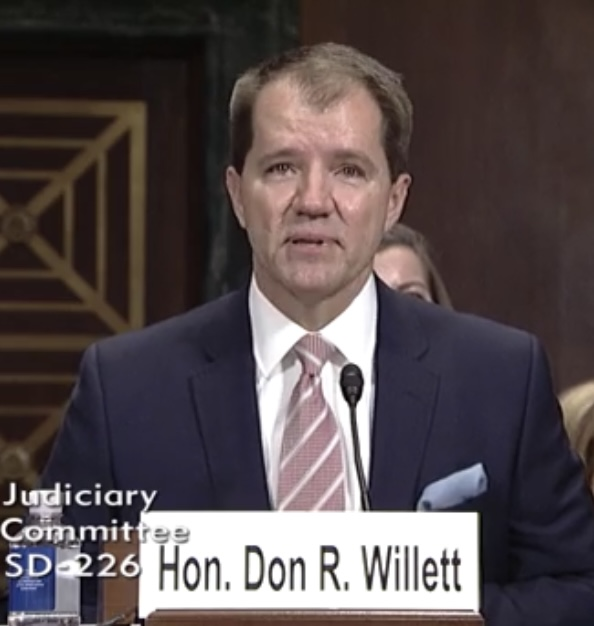
Don Willett U.S. Senate Judiciary Committee hearing - November 15, 2017

== Federal judicial service ==
On September 28, 2017, President Donald Trump announced his intent to nominate Willett to an undetermined seat on the United States Court of Appeals for the Fifth Circuit. On October 3, 2017, Willett was officially nominated to the seat vacated by Judge Emilio M. Garza, who assumed senior status on August 1, 2012.

On November 15, 2017, a hearing on his nomination was held before the Senate Judiciary Committee. On December 7, 2017, Willett's nomination was reported out of committee by an 11–9 vote. On December 12, 2017, the United States Senate invoked cloture on his nomination by a 50–48 vote. On December 13, 2017, his nomination was confirmed by a 50–47 vote. He received his judicial commission on January 2, 2018, and was sworn in the same day.

Willett was considered a potential Supreme Court nominee for President Donald Trump.

== Judicial philosophy ==
According to SCOTUSblog, "Willett views the role of judges as protecting individual liberty by striking down laws that infringe on it." In addition, "Willett's belief in the primacy of individual liberty makes him a defender of religious as well as economic freedoms." SCOTUSblog described Willett as "more inclined to defer to the legislature in cases that he does not view as impinging on individual economic or religious liberty." Like Neil Gorsuch, Willett "has made a point of writing separately to declare his principles."

In February 2019, Reason wrote that Willett had been "making a name for himself" in the area of criminal justice reform and that "it would appear that advocates of criminal justice reform have a new champion on the federal bench." Reason cited Willett's critique of the legal doctrine of qualified immunity, which shields government officials from being sued for discretionary actions performed within their official capacity. In August 2018, Willett concurred dubitante when the court found that the Texas Medical Board was entitled to qualified immunity for an unconstitutional warrantless search it made of a doctor's patient records, writing: "To some observers, qualified immunity smacks of unqualified impunity, letting public officials duck consequences for bad behavior."

== Awards ==
Willett was named Outstanding Young Alumnus of Baylor University in 2005 and inducted into the Forney High School Hall of Honor in 2007. He has received the Faith and Integrity in Legal Services Award and the Austin Under 40 Award for Government and Public Affairs.

Willett received the Texas Review of Law and Politics's 2014 Distinguished Jurist of the Year Award. Each spring, the Texas Review of Law & Politics awards its Distinguished Jurist of the Year award to an individual who has made valuable contributions both to the journal and to conservative causes of national importance.

== Personal life ==
Willett is a former rodeo bull rider. He and his wife, Tiffany, married in 2000. They live in Austin, Texas, and have three children. Tiffany served as litigation director for a member of the Texas Senate, and in D.C. as education director for the White House Fellows. When they left the Bush administration in 2003 to return home to Texas, she worked for Texas CASA, which advocates for abused and neglected children in the court system.

Willett was known for his active Twitter presence, but he has only tweeted four times since his appointment to the federal bench. The Texas House of Representatives named him "Tweeter Laureate."

In 2017, Willett helped perform the Heimlich maneuver on a diner at Chick-fil-A who was choking.

== Electoral history ==
2006

Texas Supreme Court – Place 2 Republican Primary, March 7, 2006
Party	Candidate	Votes	%
Republican	Don Willett (incumbent)	280,356	50.55%
Republican	Steven Wayne Smith	274,302	49.45%
Majority		6,054	1.10%
Total votes		554,658	100.00%

Texas Supreme Court – Place 2 Election Results, November 7, 2006
Party	Candidate	Votes	%	±%
Republican	Don Willett (incumbent)	2,135,612	51.05%	−33.21%
Democratic	Bill Moody	1,877,909	44.89%	N/A
Libertarian	Wade Wilson	169,918	4.06%	−9.58%
Majority		257,703	6.16%	−62.36%
Total votes		4,183,439	100.00%	−8.69%
Republican hold		Swing	−33.21%	

2012

Texas Supreme Court – Place 2 Republican Primary, May 29, 2012
Party	Candidate	Votes	%	±%
Republican	Don Willett (incumbent)	644,807	56.82%	+6.27%
Republican	Steven Wayne Smith	490,089	43.18%	−6.27%
Majority		154,718	13.64%	+12.54%
Total votes		1,134,896	100.00%	+104.61%

Texas Supreme Court – Place 2 Election Results, November 6, 2012
Party	Candidate	Votes	%	±%
Republican	Don Willett (incumbent)	4,771,916	78.77%	+27.72%
Libertarian	RS Roberto Koelsch	1,285,794	21.23%	+17.17%
Majority		3,486,122	57.54%	+51.38%
Total votes		6,057,710	100.00%	+44.80%
Republican hold		Swing	+27.72%	

== See also ==
- Donald Trump Supreme Court candidates
- List of justices of the Texas Supreme Court

Legal offices
Preceded by Priscilla Owen	Associate Justice of the Texas Supreme Court; 2005–2018	Succeeded by Jimmy Blacklock
Preceded by Emilio M. Garza	Judge of the United States Court of Appeals for the Fifth Circuit; 2018–present	Incumbent
