= Talty, Texas =

- City
- Location of Talty in Kaufman County, Texas
- Coordinates: 32°41′40″N 96°24′03″W
- Country: United States
- State: Texas
- County: Kaufman

Area
  - Total: 3.39 sq mi (8.78 km^{2})
  - Land: 3.39 sq mi (8.78 km^{2})
  - Water: 0 sq mi (0.00 km^{2})
- Elevation: 479 ft (146 m)

Population (2020)
  - Total: 2,500
  - Density: 740/sq mi (280/km^{2})
- Time zone: UTC-6 (Central (CST))
  - Summer (DST): UTC-5 (CDT)
- Area codes: 214, 469, 945, 972
- FIPS code: 48-71756
- GNIS feature ID: 2412032
- Website: www.taltytexas.com

Talty is a city in Kaufman County, Texas, United States. Its population was 1,535 at the 2010 census, and in 2020 the population was 2,500.

Incorporated on May 1, 1999, as the Town of Talty, the name was formally changed to City of Talty in 2015.

Don Willett, a judge on the United States Court of Appeals for the Fifth Circuit and former Texas Supreme Court justice, is from Talty.

== Geography ==
Talty is located in northwestern Kaufman County. Interstate 20 passes through the town, with access from Exit 493. I-20 leads east 7 miles (11 km) to Terrell and west 13 miles (21 km) to Interstate 635 southeast of Dallas. Downtown Dallas is 26 miles (42 km) west of Talty.

According to the United States Census Bureau, Talty has a total area of 2.7 square miles (7.1 km^{2}), all land.

== Demographics ==
Historical population
Census	Pop.	Note	%±
2000	1,028		—
2010	1,535		49.3%
2020	2,500		62.9%
2023 (est.)	3,048	▲	21.9%
U.S. Decennial Census

Talty racial composition as of 2020 (NH = Non-Hispanic) (Note: Note: the US Census treats Hispanic/Latino as an ethnic category. This table excludes Latinos from the racial categories and assigns them to a separate category. Hispanics/Latinos can be of any race.)
Race	Number	Percentage
White (NH)	1,608	64.32%
Black or African American (NH)	280	11.2%
Native American or Alaska Native (NH)	10	0.4%
Asian (NH)	14	0.56%
Some Other Race (NH)	4	0.16%
Mixed/Multi-Racial (NH)	88	3.52%
Hispanic or Latino	496	19.84%
Total	2,500	

As of the 2020 United States census, there were 2,500 people, 713 households, and 679 families residing in the town.

== Education ==
Talty is served by Forney Independent School District.

Almost all of Talty is zoned to Henderson Elementary School (in unincorporated Kaufman County), while a very small portion is zoned to Claybon Elementary School (Forney).

Warren Middle School (in unincorporated Kaufman County), and Forney High School (Forney) serve Talty students.
