= 2007 Dallas mayoral election =

- May 12, 2007
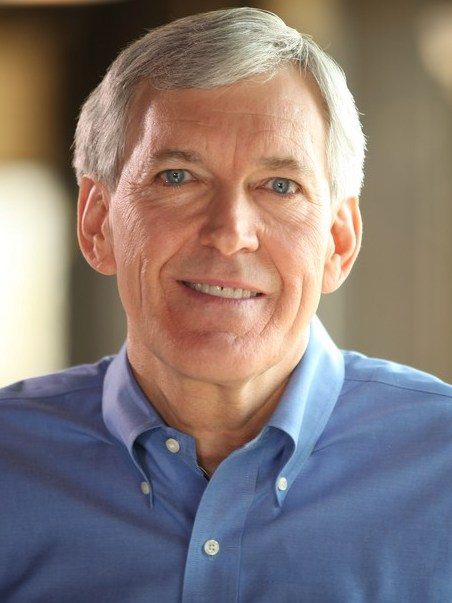

Nominee	Tom Leppert	Ed Oakley	Don Hill
First round vote	19,367	14,754	9,896
First round percentage	27.10%	20.64%	13.85%
Runoff vote	49,558	36,135
Runoff percentage	57.83%	42.17%
Nominee	Max Wells
First round vote	8,697
First round percentage	12.17%
Mayor before election
Laura Miller
Elected mayor
Tom Leppert

The 2007 Dallas mayoral election took place on May 12, 2007, to elect the successor to incumbent Mayor Laura Miller. Miller decided not to run for a second full term. The race is officially nonpartisan. After no candidate received a majority of the votes, the top two candidates – Tom Leppert and Ed Oakley – faced each other in a runoff election on June 16, 2007, in which Leppert prevailed.

== Candidates ==
- John Cappello – small businessman
- Sam Coats – former member of the Texas House of Representatives and CEO of Schlotzsky's
- Jennifer Gale – homeless activist and five time candidate for Mayor of Austin (
- Gary Griffith – two term City Councilman from District 09 (East Dallas)
- Roger Herrera – lawyer
- Don Hill – four term City Councilman from District 05 (South Dallas)
- Darrell Jordan – lawyer and candidate for Mayor of Dallas in 1995
- Tom Leppert – former CEO of Turner Construction
- Ed Oakley – three term City Councilman from District 03 (Oak Cliff)
- Edward Okpa – real estate appraiser and candidate for Mayor of Dallas in 2003

== Results ==
=== General election ===
Dallas mayoral election – May 12, 2007
Party	Candidate	Votes	%	±%
Nonpartisan candidate	Tom Leppert	19,367	27.10%	
Nonpartisan candidate	Ed Oakley	14,754	20.64%	
Nonpartisan candidate	Don Hill	9,896	13.85%	
Nonpartisan candidate	Max Wells	8,697	12.17%	
Nonpartisan candidate	Gary Griffith	6,656	9.31%	
Nonpartisan candidate	Sam Coats	5,473	7.66%	
Nonpartisan candidate	Darrell Jordan	4,062	5.68%	
Nonpartisan candidate	Roger Herrera	972	1.36%	
Nonpartisan candidate	Jennifer Gale	554	0.78%	
Nonpartisan candidate	John Cappello	504	0.71%	
Nonpartisan candidate	Edward Okpa	429	0.60%	
Nonpartisan candidate	write-ins	103	0.14%	

=== Runoff results ===
Dallas mayoral election runoff – June 16, 2007
Party	Candidate	Votes	%	±%
Nonpartisan candidate	Tom Leppert	49,558	57.83%	
Nonpartisan candidate	Ed Oakley	36,135	42.17%	
