= Frederick Haynes III =

American pastor, politician (born 1960)

- Haynes in 2026

Member-elect of the U.S. House of Representatives from Texas's 30th district
- Assuming office January 3, 2027
- Succeeding: Jasmine Crockett (redistricted)

Personal details
- Born: Frederick Douglass Haynes III; November 10, 1960 (age 66) Dallas, Texas, U.S.
- Party: Democratic
- Education: Bishop College (BA); Southwestern Baptist Theological Seminary (MDiv); Graduate Theological Foundation (DMin)

Frederick Douglass Haynes III (born November 10, 1960) is an American pastor and politician from Texas. A member of the Democratic Party, he is the pastor for Friendship-West Baptist Church in Dallas. He is the member-elect for Texas's 30th congressional district in the United States House of Representatives.

== Early life and education ==
Haynes was born in Dallas. His father, Frederick Haynes Jr., moved the family to San Francisco, where Frederick Haynes Sr. was pastor at Third Baptist Church.

Haynes earned a Bachelor of Arts from Bishop College, a Master of Divinity from Southwestern Baptist Theological Seminary, and a Doctor of Ministry from the Graduate Theological Foundation. As part of his doctoral studies, he studied at Christ Church at the University of Oxford.

== Career ==
In 1983, Haynes became the senior pastor of Friendship-West Baptist Church in Dallas, growing its membership from 100 to over 13,000. In September 2025, he took a medical leave of absence to undergo surgery and returned the following month.

In 2023, Haynes succeeded Jesse Jackson as the chief executive officer of the Rainbow/PUSH Coalition. Haynes stepped down from the position three months later.

== Political career ==
After Jasmine Crockett announced that she would run for the U.S. Senate in the 2026 election, Haynes announced that he would run to succeed her in the U.S. House of Representatives for Texas's 30th congressional district. He was endorsed by Crockett, as well as by state representative Chris Turner, Tarrant County Commissioner Alisa Simmons and by Kirk Johnson, the son of Crockett's predecessor, Rep. Eddie Bernice Johnson. Kirk Johnson said at Haynes' launch event that Haynes was like an adopted son to his mother, and she would have encouraged voters to support him. Haynes' campaign was endorsed by Justice Democrats and the Texas AFL-CIO.

On March 3, 2026, Haynes won the Democratic primary for the 30th congressional district, defeating former state representative Barbara Mallory Caraway and pastor Rodney LaBruce. Haynes won the general election on November 3.

== Electoral history ==
2026 Texas's 30th congressional district Democratic primary results
Party	Candidate	Votes	%
Democratic	Frederick Haynes III	62,775	72.4%
Democratic	Barbara Mallory Caraway	20,070	23.2%
Democratic	Rodney LaBruce	3,835	4.4%
Total votes		86,680	100%

U.S. House of Representatives
Preceded by Jasmine Crockett	Member of the U.S. House of Representatives from Texas's 30th congressional district Taking office 2027	Elect
