= Revenue bond =

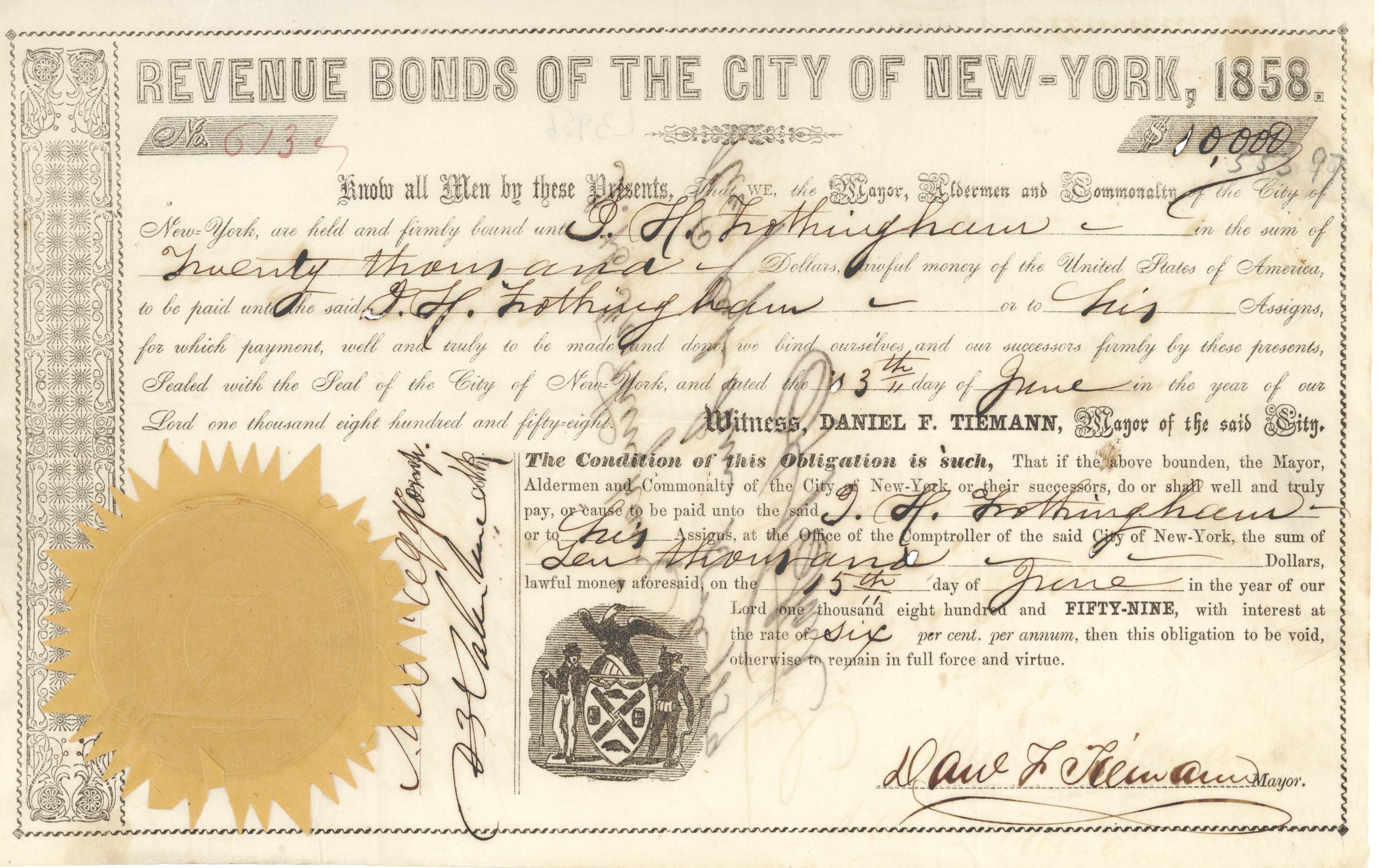
Revenue Bond of the City of New York, issued 3. June 1858, signed by mayor Daniel F. Tiemann

A revenue bond is a special type of municipal bond distinguished by its guarantee of repayment solely from revenues generated by a specified revenue-generating entity associated with the purpose of the bonds, rather than from a tax. Unlike general obligation bonds, only the revenues specified in the legal contract between the bond holder and bond issuer are required to be used for repayment of the principal and interest of the bonds; other revenues (notably tax revenues) and the general credit of the issuing agency are not so encumbered. Because the pledge of security is not as great as that of general obligation bonds, revenue bonds may carry a slightly higher interest rate than G.O. bonds; however, they are usually considered the second-most secure type of municipal bonds.

== Purpose ==
Revenue bonds may be issued to construct or expand upon various revenue-generating entities, including:

- Water and Wastewater (Sewer) utilities
- Toll roads and bridges (see toll revenue bond)
- Airports, seaports, and other transportation hubs
- Power plants and electrical generation facilities
- Prisons

Generally, any government agency or fund that is run like a business, generating operating revenues and expenses (sometimes known as an enterprise fund), can issue revenue bonds. An agency that provides a free service, such as a school, can not do so, as their only revenue is tax dollars.

== Law in the United States ==
The Supreme Court decision of Pollock v. Farmers' Loan & Trust Co. of 1895 initiated a wave or series of innovations for the financial services community in both tax-treatment and regulation from government. This specific case, according to a leading investment bank's research, resulted in the "intergovernmental tax immunity doctrine," ultimately leading to "tax-free status." The interest on municipal bonds is generally excludable from gross income for federal income tax purposes (however, capital gains or accruing market discount are not tax exempt); for these purposes, accruing original issue discount is also treated as "interest" which is excludable from gross income for federal income tax purposes. Some municipal bonds are called "specified private activity bonds" and are preference items under the alternative minimum tax. Additionally, corporate taxpayers may need to include interest on otherwise tax exempt municipal bonds in a calculation base for purposes of the alternative minimum tax and other special taxes.

For taxpayers who purchase municipal bonds issued in the same state in which they reside, interest payments are generally exempt from state and local tax also. States generally tax interest on municipal bonds issued in other states. There is considerable variability by state, however. For example, in Maryland there is also a specific exemption of capital gain on Maryland-issued municipal bonds. In contrast, Minnesota does not provide for an exemption. The differential treatment of different state's interest was considered in the case Kentucky v. Davis, 553 U.S. 328 (2008).

Municipal Bonds may be issued in one of two forms: (a) revenue bond, or (b) general obligation (GO) bond. Revenue bonds may be issued by an agency, commission, or authority created by legislation in order to construct a "facility," such as a toll bridge; turnpike; hospital; university dormitory; water; sewer, utilities and electric districts; or ports. The fees, taxes, or tolls charged for use of the facility ultimately pay off the debt.

Many governments with the power to tax also issue revenue bonds, but restrict the debt service funds to only those funds from the governmental enterprise that generates these revenues. The issuing government does not pledge its own credit to pay the bonds. When a municipality assumes liability for the debt service, if the income from the project is insufficient, it is considered to be double-barreled. In this case however, they are more like GO bonds, except that, for bankruptcy and security purposes, they have the benefit of the additional security provided by the pledged revenues. An example of double-barreled bonds is water and sewer revenue bonds issued on behalf of a water and sewer enterprise system.

Revenue bonds are most often issued to finance a revenue-generating public works project such as, bridges, tunnels, sewer systems, education (e.g. college dorms and/or student loans). In the case of education or school systems, bonds issued for colleges and universities are generally backed by income or other progressive taxes. General obligation bonds may be backed by a variety of credits depending on the state and local law; those credits include taxes on local property (ad valorem), regressive taxes and/or all other sources of revenue to the municipality. As a general rule, revenue bonds are backed by the revenue generated by the municipal facility funded by the bond issue. A feasibility study should be conducted to compare one project's IRR (internal rate of return, or hurdle rate) to another proposed project, as it is most important to ensure the success of the municipality. For instance, local government and port authorities can propose construction for a given neighborhood, based on projects that have been successful previously, or it can create a nonprofit authority to issue revenue bonds to build a school district, for example.

In recent legislation, the Financial Services Modernization Act of 1999, the Municipal Securities Rulemaking Board (Securities Acts Amendments of 1975), and now FINRA (the Financial Industry Regulatory Authority) as of July 30, 2007, the industry overall has consolidated not only in sheer number but by undoing previous legislation such as the Securities Act of 1933. Municipal bonds traditionally were exempt from the filing requirements of the Glass–Steagall Act of 1933, however, like all other securities they are subject to the anti-fraud provisions of the Securities Exchange Act of 1934, and once again the newly formed FINRA.

Some examples of Revenue Bonds include: § IDRs and IDBs (Industrial Development Revenue Bonds) or, after the passage of the Tax Reform Act of 1986, PABs (Private Activity Bonds) § Lease rental bonds § Special Assessment Bonds (or Special District Bonds or, in California, Mello-Roos Bonds) § Housing Authority Bonds

As a revenue bond is not backed by the full faith and credit of the issuing government, it does not require voter approval. As of July 1, 1983, all municipal bonds must be registered. Two other important pieces of legislation are the Tax Reform Act of 1986 and the 39 General Regulations that govern the SRO (self-regulatory organization) of the MSRB. The MSRB, as mentioned above, governs the issuance and trade of municipal securities both general obligation and revenue bonds.

== See also ==
- Build America Bonds
