= The Accommodation =

1987 book

The Accommodation: The Politics of Race in an American City is a 1987 non-fiction book by Jim Schutze. It discusses how people of different racial groups interacted during the Civil rights movement.

The book was initially published by Citadel Press of Secaucus, New Jersey, then re-released in 2021 by Deep Vellum Publishing.

Schutze argued that because powerful white people in Dallas made deals with African-American leaders, "the accommodation" referred to in the title, Dallas did not get attention during the civil rights movement, and so social changes that happened in other cities did not happen in Dallas.

== Background ==
Schutze, at the time of creating the book, worked for The Dallas Times Herald by running a newspaper column. Schutze recalled that as he worked in Dallas, he felt a sense of distance from people even though powerful people in Dallas argued that Dallas had good racial relations. Schutze decided to research the racial history at the Dallas Public Library after hearing a speech by W. A. Criswell which, according to Schutze, subtly implied that communities should, in Schutze's words, "put the boot back on the neck" of the African-American community.

== Release ==
Robert Frese, of Doubleday & Company, edited the book. Originally Taylor Publishing Company in Dallas was to publish the book, but the company canceled the publishing. According to Frese, Taylor Publishing Company wanted to avoid bad relations with figures in Dallas. It was instead published in 1987 by a company based in New Jersey.

The first printing was for 5,000 books. 2,000 of them succumbed to a fire in a warehouse.

In 2021, a first edition copy had a price of $1,204.55 on Amazon.com. According to Christian McPhate of the Dallas Observer, the book became "the Holy Grail for rare book collectors in North Texas." By 2021, other entities had made pirated copies of the book to share for free, something McPhate argued was a positive development.

In the 1990s, John Wiley Price, the commissioner of Dallas County, acquired the publishing rights. Price allowed Deep Vellum to re-publish the book. Price wrote the forward of the new edition. McPhate described Price as "a former friend of Schutze’s". The book had a re-release in 2022. There was a re-release party at the J. Erik Jonsson Central Library, and Schutze attended.
