= Friendship-West Baptist Church =

- Friendship-West Baptist Church
- 32.6466°N 96.8507°W
- Location: Dallas, Texas
- Country: USA
- Denomination: Progressive National Baptist Convention
- Website: friendshipwest.org

History
- Founded: 1976
- Founder(s): Robert L. Castle, III

Friendship-West Baptist Church is a progressive Baptist megachurch located in Dallas, Texas, USA. It is affiliated with the Progressive National Baptist Convention. The senior pastor is Frederick Haynes III.

== History ==
The church was founded in 1976 by Reverend Robert L. Castle III. In 1983, Frederick Haynes III became senior pastor. In 2006, it held the dedication of a new building comprising a 4,200-seat auditorium. In 2010, it announced it would donate $100,000 a year to social programmes. In 2014, the church purchased a bank to offer small, short-term loans to people with poor credit ratings. In November 2021, the church launched the 100 Days of Buying Black campaign to support new businesses.

In 2022, the church had 12,000 members.

== Beliefs ==
=== Marriage ===
In June 2012, Haynes announced his support for same-sex marriage.
