= 2015 Dallas municipal election =

- May 9, 2015

The 2015 Dallas municipal election was an election to determine the mayor in Dallas, Texas. The election day was May 9, 2015, and if a runoff election had been required, it would have been held on June 13, 2015. Incumbent Democratic Mayor Mike Rawlings ran and won re-election to a second term in office against challengers Marcos Ronquillo, an attorney, and write-in candidate Richard Sheridan, a retired engineer and anti-gay government activist.

Six of the current 14 members of the City Council ran unopposed, but eight other seats were contested. Historically less than 10% of voters participate in Dallas City Council elections, although 9 days of early voting were provided from April 27 through May 5. The Dallas County Elections office has published a map of these polling locations for reference.

== Mayor ==
2015 Dallas mayoral election
- May 9, 2015
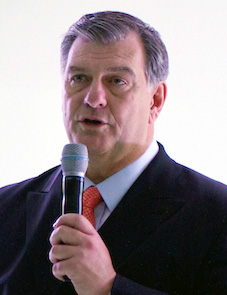

Nominee	Mike Rawlings	Marcos Ronquillo
Popular vote	30,692	11,383
Percentage	72.95%	27.05%
- Results by precinct
Mayor before election
Mike Rawlings
Elected mayor
Mike Rawlings

=== Candidates ===
- Mike Rawlings (incumbent)
- Marcos Ronquillo
- Richard P. Sheridan (write-in)

=== Results ===
Candidate	Vote number	Vote percentage
Mike Rawlings	30,692	72.95%
Marcos Ronquillo	11,383	27.05%

== District 1 ==
- Scott Griggs (incumbent)

Candidate	Vote number	Vote percentage
Scott Griggs	1,843	100.00%

== District 2 ==
- Adam Medrano (incumbent)

Candidate	Vote number	Vote percentage
Adam Medrano	1,125	100.00%

== District 3 ==
(incumbent termed out)

- Casey Thomas, II
- Gerald Britt
- Joe Tave
- Wini Cannon
- B.D. Howard

Candidate	Vote number	Vote percentage
Casey Thomas, II	1,297	38.08%
Joe Tave	936	27.48%
Gerald Britt	466	13.68%
B.D. Howard	461	13.53%
Wini Cannon	246	7.22%

== District 4 ==
(incumbent termed out)

- Stephen King
- Linda M. Wilkerson-Wynn
- Sandra Crenshaw
- Keyaira D. Saunders
- James Ross
- D. Marcus Ranger
- Carl Hays
- Carolyn King Arnold

Candidate	Vote number	Vote percentage
Carolyn King Arnold	1,552	51.51%
Carl Hays	397	13.18%
Sandra Crenshaw	380	12.61%
D. Marcus Ranger	254	8.43%
Keyaira D. Saunders	254	8.43%
James Ross	99	3.29%
Linda M. Wilkerson-Wynn	98	3.25%
Stephen King	56	1.86%

== District 5 ==
- Jesse Diaz
- Rick Callahan (incumbent)
- Sherry Cordova

Candidate	Vote number	Vote percentage
Rick Callahan	989	66.42%
Sherry Cordova	407	27.33%
Jesse Diaz	93	6.25%

== District 6 ==
- Ozumba Lnuk-X
- Daniel "DC" Caldwell, I
- Lakolya London
- Monica R. Alonzo (incumbent)

Candidate	Vote number	Vote percentage
Monica R. Alonzo	958	81.74%
Daniel "DC" Caldwell, I	152	12.97%
Lakolya London	41	3.50%
Ozumba Lnuk-X	21	1.79%

== District 7 ==
(incumbent termed out)

- Tiffinni A. Young
- Hasani Burton
- John Lawson
- Kevin Felder
- James "J.T." Turknett
- Randall Parker
- Baranda J. Fermin
- Juanita Wallace

Candidate	Vote number	Vote percentage
Tiffinni A. Young	1,304	40.55%
Kevin Felder	456	14.18%
Baranda J. Fermin	433	13.46%
Hasani Burton	413	12.84%
Juanita Wallace	240	7.46%
John Lawson	165	5.13%
Randall Parker	131	4.07%
James "J.T." Turknett	74	2.30%

== District 8 ==
(incumbent termed out)

- Dianne Gibson
- Clara McDade
- Subrina Lynn Brenham
- Eric Lemonte Williams
- Gail Terrell
- Erik Wilson

Candidate	Vote number	Vote percentage
Dianne Gibson	757	32.10%
Erik Wilson	618	26.21%
Gail Terrell	542	22.99%
Subrina Lynn Brenham	187	7.93%
Clara McDade	137	5.81%
Eric Lemonte Williams	117	4.96%

== District 9 ==
(incumbent termed out)

- Christopher Jackson
- Darren Boruff
- Mark Clayton
- Sam Merten
- Will Logg

Candidate	Vote number	Vote percentage
Mark Clayton	3,647	57.88%
Darren Boruff	1,626	25.81%
Christopher Jackson	618	9.81%
Sam Merten	309	4.90%
Will Logg	101	1.60%

== District 10 ==
(incumbent termed out)

- James N. White
- Paul Reyes
- Adam McGough

Candidate	Vote number	Vote percentage
Paul Reyes	2,337	40.85%
Adam McGough	2,081	36.37%
James N. White	1,303	22.78%

== District 11 ==
- Lee M. Kleinman (incumbent)

Candidate	Vote number	Vote percentage
Lee M. Kleinman	1,959	100.00%

== District 12 ==
- Sandy Greyson (incumbent)

Candidate	Vote number	Vote percentage
Sandy Greyson	1,414	100.00%

== District 13 ==
- Jennifer Staubach Gates (incumbent)

Candidate	Vote number	Vote percentage
Jennifer Staubach Gates	4,644	100.00%

== District 14 ==
- Philip T. Kingston (incumbent)

Candidate	Vote number	Vote percentage
Philip T. Kingston	2,871	100.00%
