= Caleb Hanie =

American football player (born 1985)

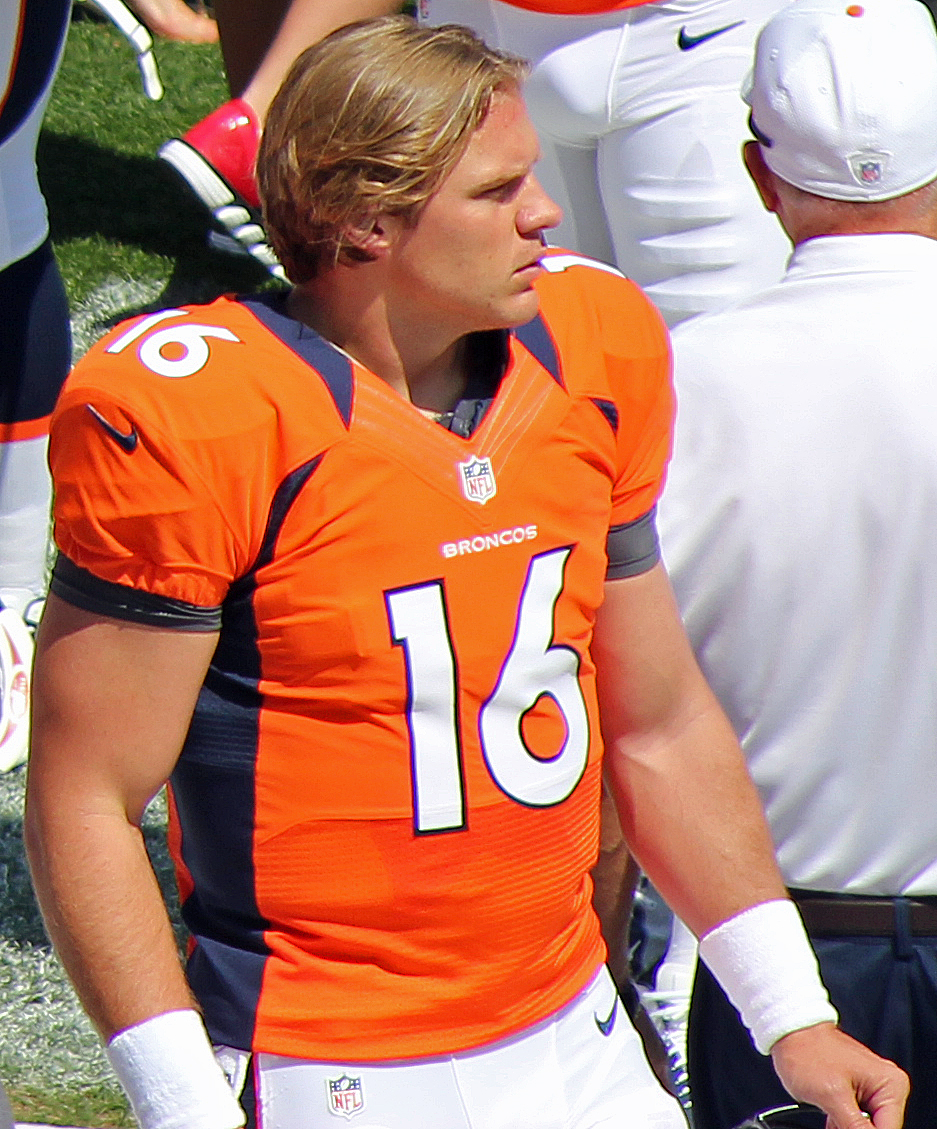
- Hanie with the Denver Broncos in 2012

No. 12
- Position: Quarterback

Personal information
- Born: September 11, 1985 (age 41); Dallas, Texas, U.S.
- Listed height: 6 ft 2 in (1.88 m)
- Listed weight: 222 lb (101 kg)

Career information
- High school: Forney (Forney, Texas)
- College: Colorado State (2004–2007)
- NFL draft: 2008: undrafted

Career history
- Chicago Bears (2008–2011); Denver Broncos (2012); Baltimore Ravens (2013)*; Cleveland Browns (2013); Dallas Cowboys (2014)*
- * Offseason or practice squad member only

Career NFL statistics
- Passing attempts: 146
- Passing completions: 79
- Completion percentage: 54.1%
- TD–INT: 3–10
- Passing yards: 1,079
- Passer rating: 41.6
- Stats at Pro Football Reference

Caleb Jeffrey Hanie (born September 11, 1985) is an American former professional football player who was a quarterback in the National Football League (NFL). He played college football for the Colorado State Rams and was signed by the Chicago Bears as an undrafted free agent in 2008. He was also a member of the Denver Broncos, Baltimore Ravens, Cleveland Browns, and Dallas Cowboys.

== Early life ==
Hanie played high school football for Forney High School in Forney, Texas, and led his team to consecutive top 3 finishes in class 3A in 2002 and 2003.

== College career ==
Hanie was the starting quarterback for the Colorado State Rams in 2006 and 2007. He finished with college career totals of 6,337 passing yards, 39 passing touchdowns, 34 interceptions, and eight rushing touchdowns.

== Professional career ==
=== Chicago Bears ===
Hanie was signed by the Chicago Bears as a free agent following the 2008 NFL draft on April 28, 2008. He made the Bears' 53-man roster prior to the start of the 2008 season.

He made his first regular season contribution as a Bear towards the end of their blowout loss to the Cincinnati Bengals on October 25, 2009. He completed one of two passes for two yards. He went on to make another appearance against the Baltimore Ravens on December 20, 2009, completing two of five passes for eight yards. During that game, he also threw his first career interception on an acrobatic play by Dominique Foxworth. On October 3, 2010, Bears starter Jay Cutler and backup Todd Collins both suffered injuries in a game against the New York Giants, and Hanie entered the game as the third quarterback. He went three of four for 36 yards, but the Bears still suffered their first loss of the 2010 season. On October 10, 2010, with Cutler on the bench due to a concussion suffered the previous week, Collins started the game but proved ineffective, throwing four interceptions. Hanie entered the game in the third quarter and went 2-3 for 19 yards. The Bears won the game 23–6, primarily on points scored in the early part of the first quarter, and scored two fourth-quarter field goals on drives led by Hanie.

==== 2010 NFC Championship Game ====
Hanie entered the 2010 NFC Championship Game as the third-string quarterback in the third quarter after starter Jay Cutler left with a second-degree sprain of his MCL and second-string quarterback Todd Collins left with a shoulder injury. He led the Bears to a touchdown in his first series on the field but was later intercepted by defensive lineman B. J. Raji, who returned the interception for a touchdown. On the following drive, Hanie led the Bears to a second touchdown in only 81 seconds of game time. He later threw another interception, this time to Sam Shields, with 37 seconds left in the game. Overall, Hanie completed 13 passes in 20 attempts for 153 yards and a touchdown with two interceptions. The Bears lost to the Packers 21–14.

In the near-comeback, Hanie became the first quarterback since 1983 to throw a postseason touchdown before a regular season touchdown.

==== 2011 season ====
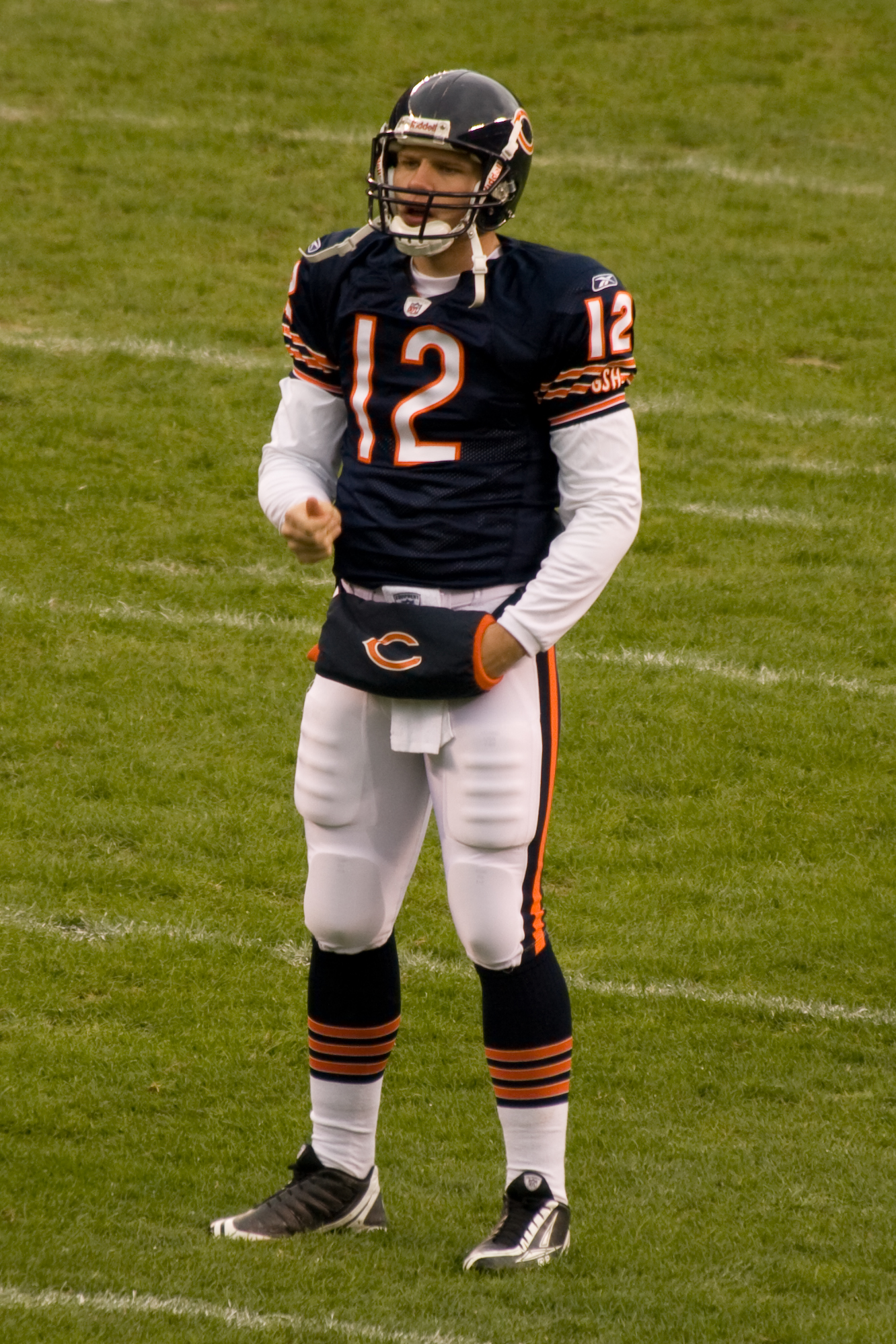
Hanie with the Chicago Bears in 2008

After a back-and-forth preseason, Hanie won a battle with Nate Enderle for the second position on the depth chart. Against the San Diego Chargers in week 11, starting quarterback Jay Cutler suffered a broken thumb on his throwing hand. The following day, the Bears reported that Cutler would need surgery on the thumb, possibly ending his season. Hanie was named the starter for the Bears until Cutler's return.

On November 27, 2011, Hanie started his first NFL game against the Oakland Raiders. He threw two touchdowns and three interceptions in the 25–20 loss, snapping the Bears' five-game winning streak. In that game, however, with 8 seconds left, looking to spike the ball, Hanie did not spike the ball immediately; instead he stepped backward, as if attempting a pass, and then spiked the ball. Consequently, he was charged with intentional grounding and was ordered to runoff the time remaining on the clock, preserving a Raiders win. The following week, Hanie threw three interceptions in a 10–3 loss to the Kansas City Chiefs. The Bears eventually lost in overtime to the Denver Broncos 13–10. After getting swept against the Seattle Seahawks 38–14, Hanie was replaced by Josh McCown for Week 16 against the Packers and Minnesota Vikings in Week 17.

The Bears stated that they would not re-sign Hanie for 2012.

=== Denver Broncos ===
Hanie signed with the Denver Broncos on March 24, 2012. In the 2012 preseason, Hanie and newly acquired quarterback Peyton Manning faced Hanie's former team in the Bears in Week 1 of the preseason. During the game, though Hanie was sacked three times by Shea McClellin, Cheta Ozougwu, and Nate Collins, Hanie completed 7/14 passes for 79 yards and a 67.3 passer rating, en route to a 31–3 victory.

=== Baltimore Ravens ===
Hanie signed a one-year contract with the Baltimore Ravens on April 16, 2013, as competition for Tyrod Taylor for the backup quarterback position. He was released on August 30, 2013.

=== Cleveland Browns ===
Hanie was signed by the Cleveland Browns on December 3, 2013. However, he was waived on December 10.

=== Dallas Cowboys ===
Hanie was signed to a one-year deal by the Dallas Cowboys on April 23, 2014. Hanie was released by the team on August 26, 2014.

== Career statistics ==
=== NFL ===
==== Regular season ====
| Year | Team | Games | | Passing | | | | | | | | Rushing | | | | Sacks | | Fumbles | |
| Year | Team | GP | GS | Cmp | Att | Pct | Yds | Avg | TD | Int | Rtg | Att | Yds | Avg | TD | Sck | SckY | Fum | Lost |
|---|---|---|---|---|---|---|---|---|---|---|---|---|---|---|---|---|---|---|---|
| 2008 | CHI | 0 | 0 | DNP | | | | | | | | | | | | | | | |
| 2009 | CHI | 2 | 0 | 3 | 7 | 42.9 | 11 | 1.6 | 0 | 1 | 10.7 | 0 | 0 | 0.0 | 0 | 0 | 0 | 0 | 0 |
| 2010 | CHI | 2 | 0 | 5 | 7 | 71.4 | 55 | 7.9 | 0 | 0 | 94.3 | 1 | -1 | -1.0 | 0 | 2 | 15 | 0 | 0 |
| 2011 | CHI | 6 | 4 | 51 | 102 | 50.0 | 613 | 6.0 | 3 | 9 | 41.8 | 13 | 98 | 7.5 | 0 | 19 | 133 | 1 | 0 |
| 2012 | DEN | 0 | 0 | DNP | | | | | | | | | | | | | | | |
| 2013 | CLE | 0 | 0 | DNP | | | | | | | | | | | | | | | |
| Career | | 10 | 4 | 59 | 116 | 56.5 | 804 | 6.4 | 3 | 10 | 41.6 | 14 | 97 | 6.9 | 0 | 21 | 148 | 1 | 0 |

==== Postseason ====
| Year | Team | Games | | Passing | | | | | | | | Rushing | | | | Sacks | | Fumbles | |
| Year | Team | GP | GS | Cmp | Att | Pct | Yds | Avg | TD | Int | Rtg | Att | Yds | Avg | TD | Sck | SckY | Fum | Lost |
|---|---|---|---|---|---|---|---|---|---|---|---|---|---|---|---|---|---|---|---|
| 2010 | CHI | 1 | 0 | 13 | 20 | 65.0 | 153 | 7.7 | 1 | 2 | 65.2 | 1 | 3 | 3.0 | 0 | 0 | 0 | 0 | 0 |
| Career | | 1 | 0 | 13 | 20 | 65.0 | 153 | 7.7 | 1 | 2 | 65.2 | 1 | 3 | 3.0 | 0 | 0 | 0 | 0 | 0 |

=== College ===
| Year | Team | Passing | | | | | | Rushing | | | |
| Year | Team | Comp | Att | Yds | TD | INT | Rtg | Att | Yds | Avg | TD |
|---|---|---|---|---|---|---|---|---|---|---|---|
| 2004 | Colorado State | 85 | 147 | 1,204 | 8 | 7 | 135.1 | 36 | 68 | 1.9 | 2 |
| 2005 | Colorado State | 13 | 29 | 251 | 2 | 0 | 140.3 | 12 | 57 | 4.8 | 0 |
| 2006 | Colorado State | 209 | 342 | 2,427 | 11 | 12 | 124.3 | 108 | 55 | 0.5 | 4 |
| 2007 | Colorado State | 188 | 293 | 2,455 | 18 | 15 | 144.6 | 92 | 6 | 0.1 | 2 |
| Career | | 495 | 811 | 6,337 | 39 | 34 | 134.2 | 248 | 186 | 0.8 | 8 |

== Post-football career ==
Hanie is married to his wife, Andrea. They have three children. He identifies as a Christian.

In May 2016, Hanie was a passenger in a fatal crash in Barrington Hills, Illinois, in which 35-year-old Salvatore DiMucci died. DiMucci was driving a 2015 Mercedes-Benz that crashed into a tree. Also in the vehicle was another former Chicago Bear, Joey LaRocque.

As of 2020, Hanie was working as a financial adviser, working with current and former NFL players.
