= National City Bank =

National City Bank can refer to several entities:

== Companies ==
- National City Corp., based in Cleveland, Ohio
- National City Bank of New York, now Citibank

== Buildings ==
- National City Bank (Evansville, Indiana), listed on the National Register of Historic Places
- National City Bank (New York City)
- National City Bank Building (Toledo), Ohio
- National City Bank Building (Columbus), Ohio

== See also ==
- National bank (United States)
