= Dwaine Caraway =

Mayor of Dallas in 2011

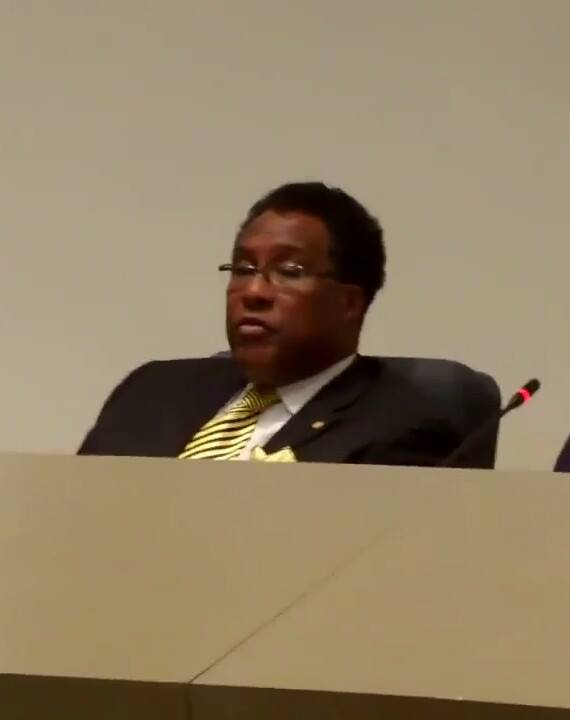
- Caraway in 2012

Acting Mayor of Dallas
- In office February 26, 2011 – June 26, 2011
- Preceded by: Tom Leppert
- Succeeded by: Mike Rawlings

Personal details
- Born: April 30, 1952 (age 74) Dallas, Texas, U.S.
- Party: Democratic
- Spouse: Barbara Mallory

Dwaine R. Caraway (born April 30, 1952) is an American former politician who served as the 60th mayor of Dallas in an interim capacity in 2011. He pleaded guilty in 2018 for taking bribes while serving as mayor pro tem. He served as a Dallas City Council member until his resignation on August 9, 2018.

== Early life and career ==
Caraway is a graduate of Roosevelt High School in Dallas and attended Texas Southern University for two years.

Caraway was first elected as a city council member in 2007.

His wife, Barbara, had previously served on the city council and is a former member of the Texas House of Representatives. In 2011, Caraway became acting mayor after Mayor Tom Leppert resigned to campaign for the U.S. Senate. Caraway's first meeting with the Dallas City Council was on March 2, 2011. He served as interim mayor until June 26, 2011, when he was succeeded by elected mayor Mike Rawlings.

Caraway then served as a Dallas City Council member representing District 4. Caraway left the city council in 2015 due to consecutive term limits, but was elected again in 2017. He was replaced in a special election by Carolyn King Arnold, who was elected to his seat in 2015.

== Controversies and conviction ==
In 2011, Caraway drew sharp criticism for his attempt to honor convicted felon Michael Vick by presenting him with a ceremonial key to the City of Dallas. On February 22, 2016, Caraway was involved in a melee with Dallas County commissioner John Wiley Price at the gospel radio station KHVN.

On January 25, 2018, local news in Dallas reported that Caraway was linked to Slater Swartwood, a businessman facing prison time for bribing public officials. Dallas television station NBC 5 questioned Caraway about his receipt of payments from Swartwood, who had testified that he directed payments to Caraway in exchange for Caraway's support of Swartwood's company, Elf Investments, getting contracts from the city. The alleged payments occurred when Caraway was a member of the Dallas city council. On August 9, 2018, Caraway pleaded guilty to federal corruption charges including criminal conspiracy, wire fraud and tax evasion.

Caraway was sentenced to serve 56 months in prison in April and ordered to pay more than $500,000 in restitution. Caraway began serving his sentence at a West Texas federal prison on May 7, 2019.

Political offices
| Preceded by Tom Leppert | Mayor of Dallas; 2011 | Succeeded by Mike Rawlings |
