= John Wiley Price =

American politician

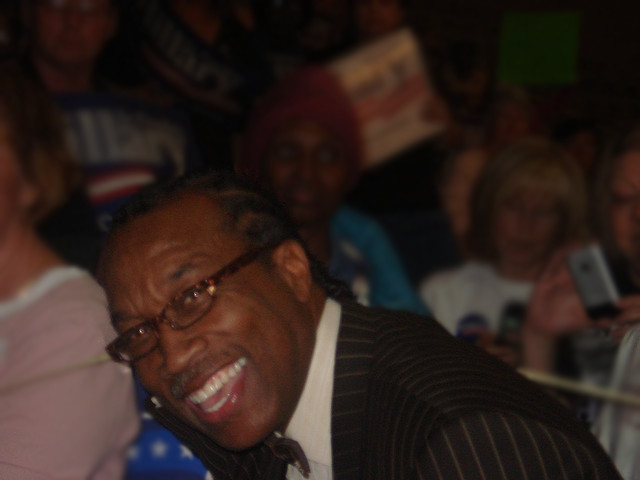
- Price in 2008

Dallas County Commissioner Precinct 3
- Incumbent
- Assumed office January 1, 1985
- Preceded by: Jim Tyson

Personal details
- Born: April 24, 1950 (age 76) San Augustine County, Texas
- Party: Democratic
- Children: 3
- Website: Campaign website

John Wiley Price (born April 24, 1950) is an American politician serving as a member of the Dallas County Commissioners Court since 1985. A member of the Democratic Party, he campaigns as "Our Man Downtown".

== Early life and education ==
Price was born on April 24, 1950, in San Augustine County, Texas and grew up in the small town of Forney in Kaufman County with his siblings Holman Earl, Shotzie, Vanessa, Renee and Kelvin. He attended the town's schools, and has throughout his speaking career spoke of the desegregation experience there. Price's father, Rev. Holman Colman Price worked as a truck driver and built a small career as a part-time Baptist preacher, which afforded Willie Faye McCoy Price, a homemaker's career.

After Price graduated from high school, he moved to Dallas, where he attended El Centro College and studied computer programming. In the 1970s, Price married Vivian Pauline née Salinas Price in his father's chapel; the couple had one child together. In 1972, he ran for his first political office as chair of his Dallas Precinct. After winning, in the latter part of 1973, at the age of 23 Price was appointed to his first civic position on the advisory board of Crossroads Community Center near Fair Park. On December 1, 1975, Price would be appointed as Chief Clerk for Judge Cleo Steele.

He would later divorce his wife in 1983. Price adopted two children, John Nicholas and Angelina Monique.

== Political career ==
=== 1990s ===
Price has aroused local controversy during his time in office. During the 1980s and 1990s Price would lead protests for racial issues in the Dallas area. In the spring of 1990 Price threatened a citywide “call to arms” if the city manager did not pick someone sensitive to minorities for a new police chief. Price was quoted in the paper as saying “M-16's and all, we will take to the (expletive) street, we'll shoot at (expletive) police cars.” Soon after that he got into a fight with an off-duty policeman who was jogging by Price's home. The officer yelled “Wiley sucks!”. Price then pulled out a gun and allegedly stuck it against the officer's head. In 1991 during a protest, Price was accused of breaking the ankle of a construction worker. In May 1992, Price was found not guilty of felony assault charges from the incident. The verdict was rendered just days after the Rodney King riots in the Los Angeles area, and several jurors reported to have received threatening phones calls during the trial.

It was during the early 1990s that Price, who hosted his own radio show called "Talk Back, Liberation Radio" on KKDA (AM), developed a relationship with Aaron Michaels, who worked for Price as a producer. Price's radical black politics were highly influential on Michaels. Price had Michaels create a militant group called "The Warriors" who acted as security for Price. This group later formed the nucleus of the Dallas chapter of the New Black Panther Party, founded by Michaels.

=== 2010s ===
Price again made headlines when he launched a profanity-laced tirade at a December 2009 Dallas County Commissioner's Court meeting over the ongoing investigation of impropriety among Dallas Constables. Price repeatedly pounded on the desk in front of him and responded to a call from County Judge Jim Foster for order by declaring that Foster should "Make me come to order!"

In February 2011 Price got into a shouting match with Dallas lawyer Jeff Turner at a Dallas county commissioner's meeting. Turner repeatedly called Price a 'Chief Mullah' and 'tribal', terms that Price took offense to and led him to ask Turner to speak to him in private. Price later stated that he interpreted "Mullah" as "Moolah", similar to the racial epithet "Moulie". The public confrontation resulted in a shouting match before Price asked out loud why all the speakers were white. When an audience member shouted, "You’ve asked respect of us. We demand respect from you," Price said "All of you are white. Go to hell". Price then headed for the exit and challenged the protesters to follow him and continue the discussion outside. At this point security personnel ordered the court to be cleared.

In August 2011, Price appears to assault a reporter on video outside of a county office. Later Price is heard on tape threatening to assault the reporter.

=== FBI Investigation ===
In July 2011, Price and multiple associates were served with search warrants obtained by the Federal Bureau of Investigation arising out of acts of alleged public corruption. The warrant on Price's residence specified a search for data related to violations of the U.S. Code Titles 18, 26, or 31, specifically "Theft or Bribery Concerning Programs Receiving Federal Funds," tax evasion, fraud, false statements, money laundering, and "aiding and abetting and conspiracy to violate these statutes." The FBI seized multiple assets belonging to Price. According to Federal sources, Price was arrested by the FBI on Friday, July 25, 2014. His trial had been scheduled for January 2016 and he was ordered to contribute $80,000 towards his own defense.

U.S. District Judge Barbara Lynn granted a lengthy postponement for Price's trial on charges of corruption. Price's trial was set to begin January 19, 2016 more than a year after his first appearance in the case on July 24, 2014, with the earliest the trial could begin being September 6, 2016. On June 24, 2016, U.S. District Judge Barbara Lynn pushed the trial date back to February 21, 2017, due to the amount of evidence the government accumulated, 9.2 terabytes worth, and the time needed for the defense to sort through it all.

John Wiley Price pleaded not guilty on Thursday, February 23, 2017. The trial then began on Monday, February 27. On April 28, 2017, a jury found Price not guilty on several of the charges, and failed to reach a verdict on one count. On May 19, 2017, the United States Attorney's Office announced it would not continue the prosecution of Commissioner Price as it pertained to the remaining count.

Commissioner Price was represented by Shirley Baccus-Lobel and Chris Knox.

== Controversy ==
On February 22, 2016, Price was involved in a melee with Dwaine Caraway, in which he is accused of choking a Caraway campaign staffer, at the gospel radio station KHVN Heaven 97.

== Honors ==
A school constructed in a village in Kenya was named after John Wiley Price. The school was a project of the U.S.-based non-governmental organization Build African Schools, which also electrifies and provides computers to schools on that continent and named this particular school after Price at the behest of contributor Russell Fish, a Dallas-area computer entrepreneur.

== See also ==
- The Accommodation - Price obtained the rights to this book
