= Build America Bonds =

Build America Bonds are taxable municipal bonds that carry special tax credits and federal subsidies for either the bond issuer or the bondholder. Build America Bonds were created under Section 1531 of Title I of Division B of the American Recovery and Reinvestment Act that U.S. President Barack Obama signed into law on February 17, 2009. The program expired December 31, 2010.

== Purpose of and eligibility for Build America Bonds ==
The purpose of Build America Bonds, commonly referred to as BABs, is to reduce the cost of borrowing for state and local government issuers and governmental agencies. Some traditionally tax-exempt issuers, such as private party issuers and 501(c)(3) organizations, were not eligible to use the Build America Bond program. The program was only open to new issue capital expenditure bonds issued before January 1, 2011; BABs could not be issued for refinancing transactions.

Build America Bonds can provide states and localities with substantial savings on their borrowing costs. According to the United States Department of the Treasury, the savings for a 10-year bond are estimated to be 31 basis points and the savings for a 30-year bond are estimated to be 112 basis points versus traditional tax-exempt financing.

== Types of Build America Bonds ==
There are two types of Build America Bonds (often abbreviated as BABs): "Tax Credit BABs" and "Direct Payment BABs." The Direct Payment bonds provide a subsidy of 35% of the interest, paid to the issuer. The Tax Credit bonds provides a refundable tax credit directly to the bondholders. While the bondholder is the recipient of the tax credit through Tax Credit bond, and the bond issuer is the recipient of the tax subsidy through Direct Payment bond, both options reduce the cost of borrowing for the issuer in comparison to traditional taxable corporate bonds; in many cases, it is more cost effective than issuing traditional tax-exempt bonds.

== Investors ==
While Build America Bonds are taxable fixed income securities, the biggest holders include both traditional and non-traditional municipal bond holders. The largest buyers include insurance companies, mutual funds, foreign central banks, and foreign commercial banks.

== Issuance ==
From the time of the program's inception in April 2009, through the end of the program at the end of 2010, a total of US$181 billion of Build America Bonds were issued.

== See also ==
- Municipal bonds
