= Forney, Texas =

- City
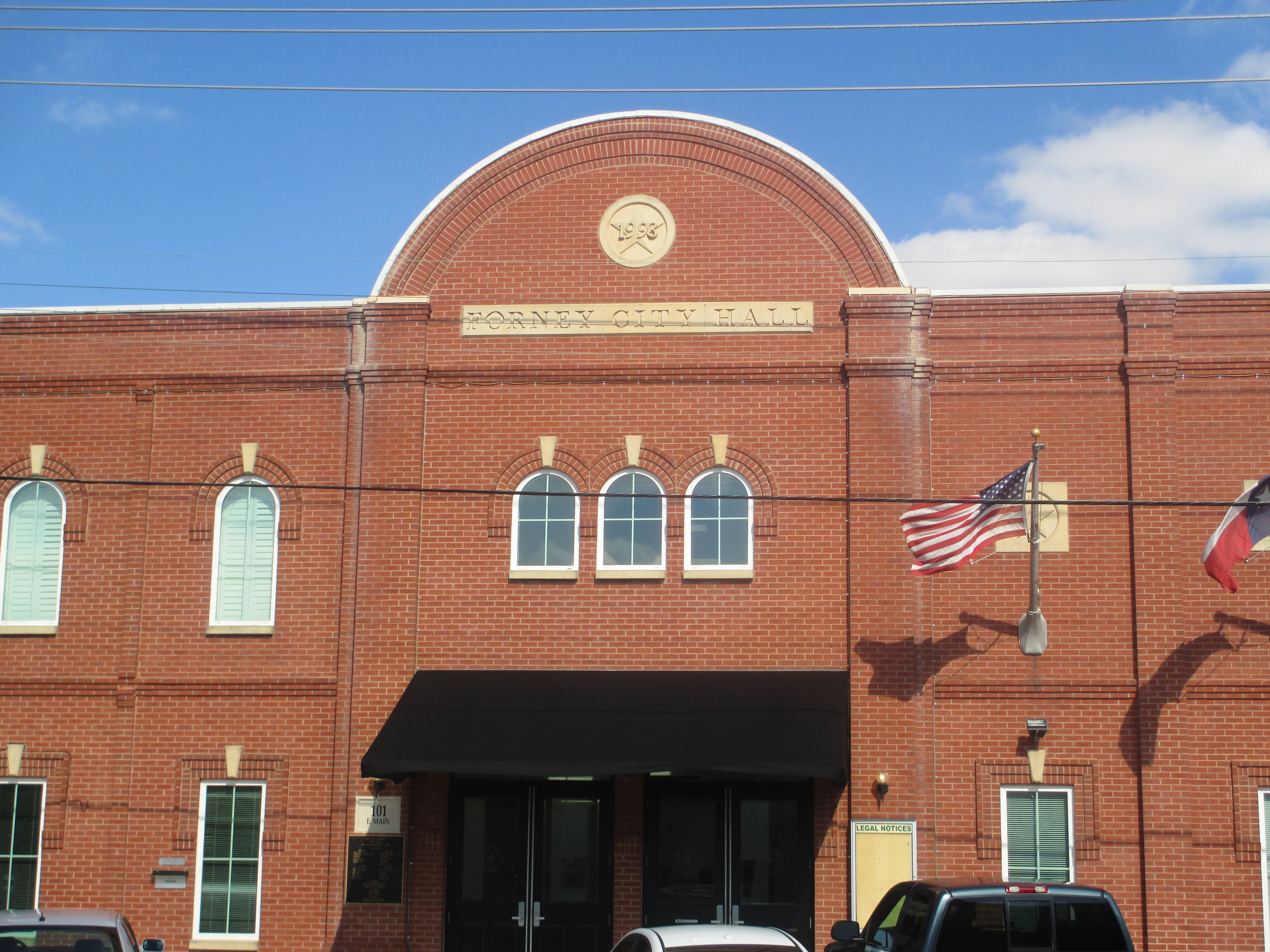
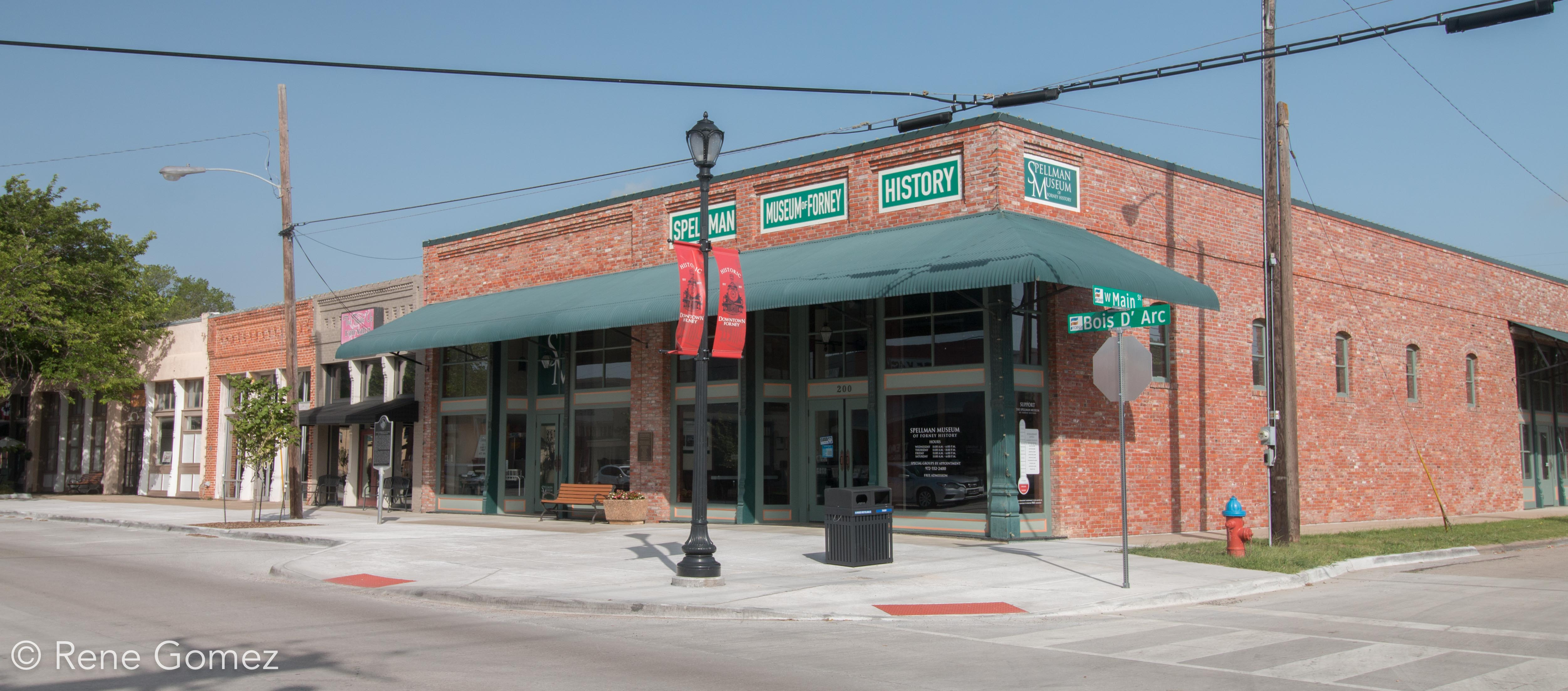
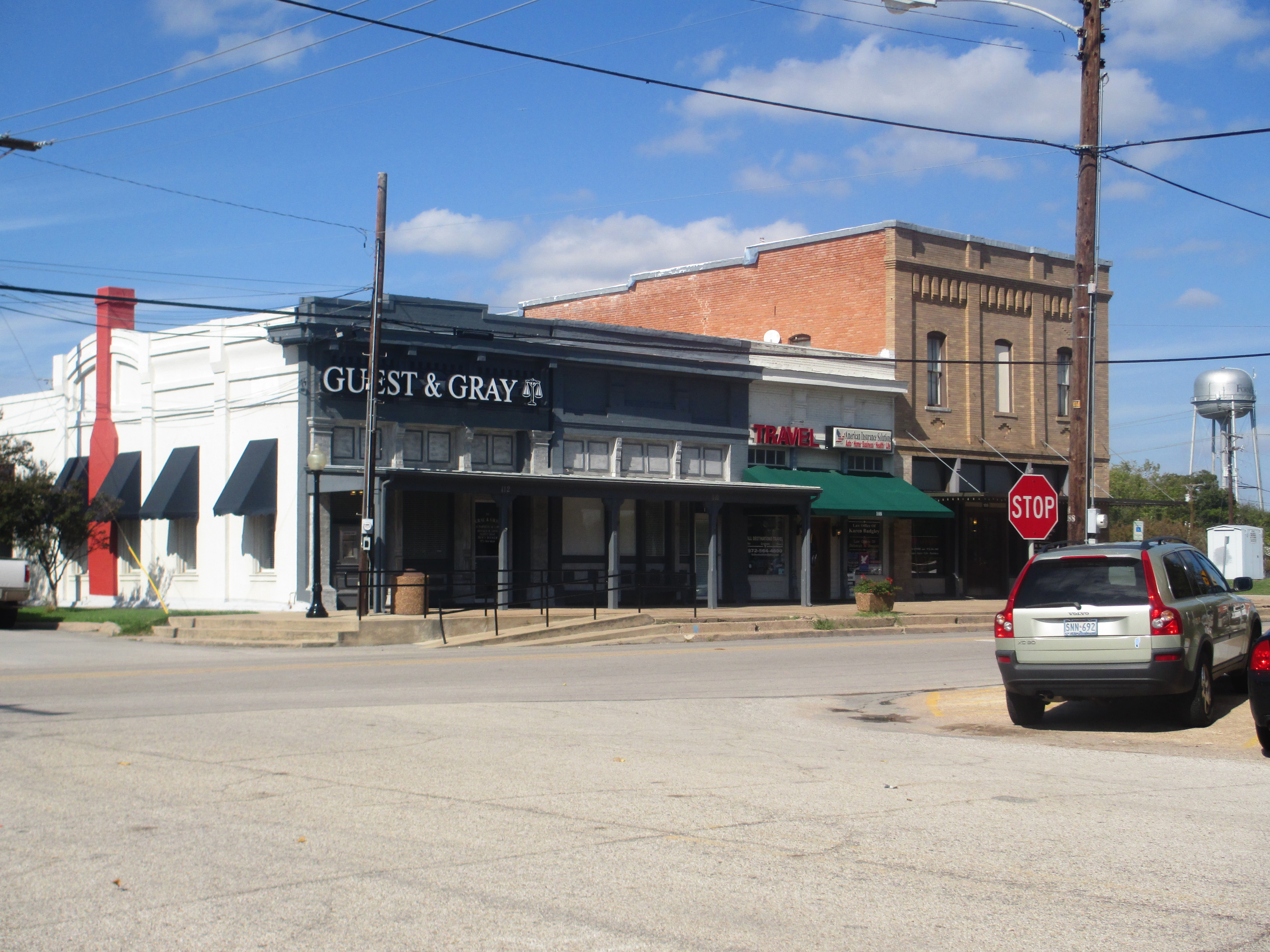
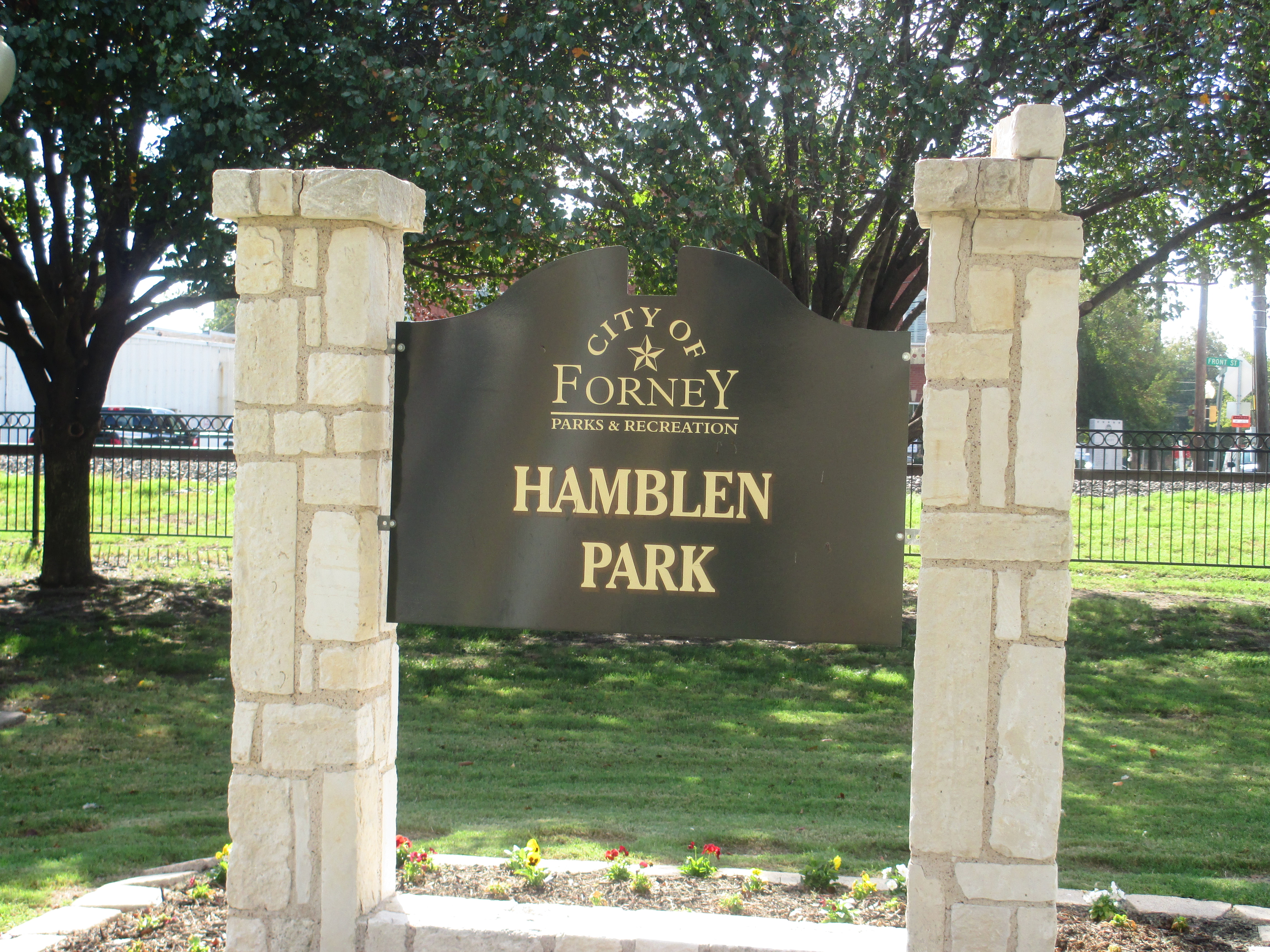
- Forney City Hall Downtown Forney, Texas A portion of downtown Forney Hamblen Park is located behind City Hall and near the Missouri Pacific Railroad car in Forney.

- Flag
- Nicknames: "City Without Limits"; "Antique Capital of Texas"
- Motto(s): "Everyday through good times and bad"
- Location of Forney in Kaufman County, Texas
- Coordinates: 32°45′07″N 96°27′21″W
- Country: United States
- State: Texas
- County: Kaufman
- Founded: 1871
- Incorporated: 1884
- Named for: John W. Forney

Government
  - Type: Council-Manager
  - Mayor: Jason Roberson (2023-)

Area
  - City: 15.826 sq mi (40.989 km^{2})
  - Land: 15.804 sq mi (40.931 km^{2})
  - Water: 0.022 sq mi (0.056 km^{2})
- Elevation: 459 ft (140 m)

Population (2020)
  - City: 23,455
  - Estimate (2025): 41,658
  - Rank: US: 1143rd TX: 104th
  - Density: 2,244/sq mi (866.6/km^{2})
  - Urban: 5,732,354 (US: 6th)
  - Metro: 8,100,037 (US: 4th)
- Time zone: UTC–6 (Central (CST))
  - Summer (DST): UTC–5 (CDT)
- ZIP Code: 75126
- Area codes: 214, 469, 972, 945
- FIPS code: 48-26604
- GNIS feature ID: 2410521
- Sales tax: 8.25%
- Website: forneytx.gov

Forney is a city in Kaufman County, Texas, United States, and has been named by the Texas Legislature as the "Antique Capital of Texas". It is part of the Greater Dallas metro area. The population was 23,455 at the 2020 census.

== Geography ==
Forney is located in northwestern Kaufman County. U.S. Route 80 passes through the city as a four-lane limited-access highway, leading west 20 miles (32 km) to the center of Dallas and east 11 miles (18 km) to Terrell.

According to the United States Census Bureau, the city has a total area of 15.826 square miles (40.99 km^{2}), of which, 15.804 square miles (40.93 km^{2}) is land and 0.022 square miles (0.06 km^{2}) is water.

Forney is approximately 4 mi (6 km) southeast of Lake Ray Hubbard, which was formerly known as Forney Lake.

=== Climate ===
The climate in this area is characterized by hot, humid summers and generally mild to cool winters. According to the Köppen climate classification, Forney has a humid subtropical climate, Cfa on climate maps.

On April 3, 2012, an EF-3 tornado struck the city as part of the tornado outbreak of that date. Several homes were completely destroyed, and many others were severely damaged in the Diamond Creek subdivision. The tornado caused significant roof damage to Crosby Elementary School in Forney. A car in the parking lot of the school was tossed about 300 yards and found in a field. Less severe damage was reported in downtown Forney and to a dry cleaning business. Despite the severe damage, no deaths occurred, but seven people sustained injuries from the tornado. No deaths were reported from either the Forney tornado or any other tornado that day.

== Demographics ==
Historical population
Census	Pop.	Note	%±
1880	317		—
1890	811		155.8%
1910	1,114		—
1920	1,345		20.7%
1930	1,216		−9.6%
1940	1,295		6.5%
1950	1,425		10.0%
1960	1,544		8.4%
1970	1,745		13.0%
1980	2,483		42.3%
1990	4,070		63.9%
2000	5,588		37.3%
2010	14,661		162.4%
2020	23,455		60.0%
2025 (est.)	41,658		77.6%
U.S. Decennial Census; Texas Almanac: 1850-2000; 2020 Census

=== Racial and ethnic composition ===
Forney city, Texas - Demographic Profile (NH = Non-Hispanic)
Race / Ethnicity	Pop 2010	Pop 2020	% 2010	% 2020
White (NH)	10,442	12,665	71.22%	54.00%
Black or African American (NH)	1,433	4,118	9.77%	17.56%
Native American or Alaska Native (NH)	88	105	0.60%	0.45%
Asian (NH)	154	547	1.05%	2.33%
Pacific Islander (NH)	2	15	0.01%	0.06%
Some Other Race (NH)	14	69	0.10%	0.29%
Mixed/Multi-Racial (NH)	186	1,064	1.27%	4.54%
Hispanic or Latino	2,342	4,872	16.0%	20.77%
Total	14,661	23,455	100.0%	100.00%

=== 2020 census ===
As of the 2020 census, Forney had a population of 23,455, 7,876 households, and 6,043 families residing in the city. The median age was 32.9 years; 31.1% of residents were under the age of 18 and 9.1% of residents were 65 years of age or older. For every 100 females there were 91.4 males, and for every 100 females age 18 and over there were 88.1 males age 18 and over.

The population density was 1,584.0 inhabitants per square mile (611.6/km^{2}). There were 8,579 housing units, of which 8.2% were vacant. The homeowner vacancy rate was 2.8% and the rental vacancy rate was 15.1%.

There were 7,876 households in Forney, of which 48.0% had children under the age of 18 living in them. Of all households, 57.5% were married-couple households, 13.2% were households with a male householder and no spouse or partner present, and 24.0% were households with a female householder and no spouse or partner present. About 19.2% of all households were made up of individuals and 6.2% had someone living alone who was 65 years of age or older.

97.7% of residents lived in urban areas, while 2.3% lived in rural areas.

Racial composition as of the 2020 census
Race	Number	Percent
White	13,952	59.5%
Black or African American	4,213	18.0%
American Indian and Alaska Native	193	0.8%
Asian	569	2.4%
Native Hawaiian and Other Pacific Islander	20	0.1%
Some other race	1,549	6.6%
Two or more races	2,959	12.6%
Hispanic or Latino (of any race)	4,872	20.8%

== Education ==
The Forney Independent School District serves Forney, Talty, an annex of Mesquite, and part of the community of Heartland. Forney is served by several elementary schools, three intermediate schools, Jackson Middle School, Warren Middle School, Brown Middle School, Forney High School, and North Forney High School. In 2010, the district received an academic rating of "Exemplary" based on the test results of the Texas Assessment of Knowledge and Skills. The district also has an eBook program, where students in high school, middle school, and intermediate school are provided with a laptop for schoolwork.

In June 2022, the Forney Independent School District announced a new dress code that bans all "hoodies" and hooded coats and jackets. It also bans dresses, skirts, and skorts for all except kids in prekindergarten through the fourth grade in an effort the district says will “help prepare students for a safe and successful future.”

== Notable people ==
- Darlene Cates, actress
- Markies Deandre Conway aka Yella Beezy, rapper, singer, songwriter
- Tex Erwin, Major League Baseball player
- Evan Gattis, MLB player, Houston Astros
- Josh Geer, MLB player, San Diego Padres
- Caleb Hanie, NFL player
- William Madison McDonald, politician, businessman, and banker
- John Wiley Price, Dallas County commissioner
- Don Willett, Fifth Circuit judge as of 2018, former Supreme Court of Texas associate justice
