= Arch B. Swank Jr. =

American architect (1913–1999)

- Born: Arch Berry Swank Jr. June 2, 1913; Wills Point, Texas, US
- Died: January 15, 1999 (aged 85); Dallas, Texas, US
- Education: Texas A&M University
- Occupation: Architect
- Spouse: Patsy Swank

Arch Berry Swank Jr. (June 2, 1913 – January 15, 1999) was an American architect.

== Biography ==
=== Early life ===
Swank was born in Wills Point, Texas, on June 2, 1913. He graduated from Texas A&M University in College Station, Texas in 1936. He served in the United States Army during the Second World War.

=== Career ===
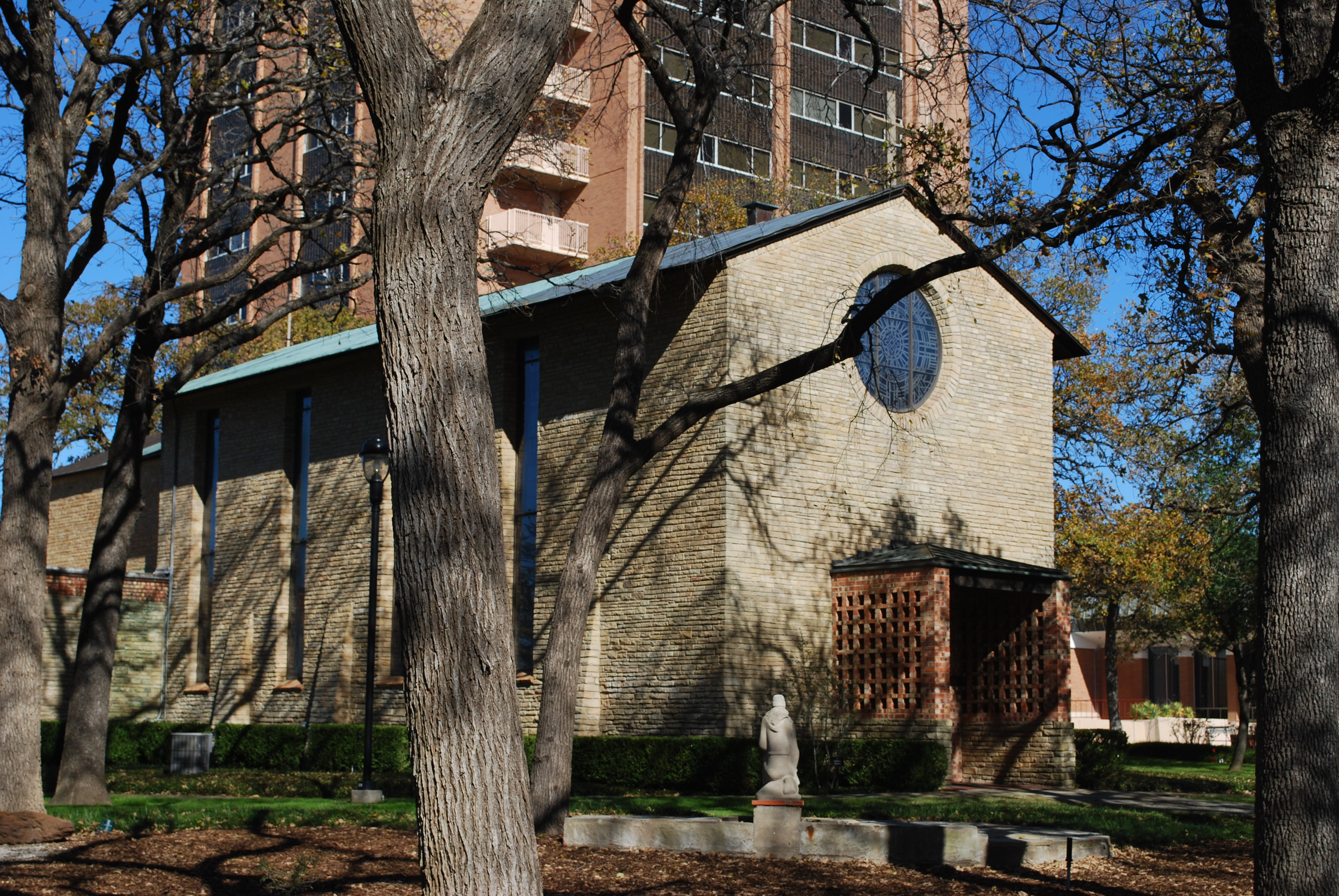
Little Chapel in the Woods in Denton, Texas.

From 1937 to 1941, he worked with architect O'Neil Ford (1905–1982). Together, and alongside Preston Geren Sr. (1891–1969), they designed the Little Chapel in the Woods in Denton, Texas.

From the end of World War II to 1952, he worked with architect Roscoe DeWitt (1894–1975). Together, they designed buildings of the Parkland Memorial Hospital, two Neiman Marcus stores, and Stanley Marcus's private residence, all in Dallas. Additionally, in Jacksonville, Florida, they designed the St. Vincent’s Medical Center. In 1951, he became President of the Dallas chapter of the American Institute of Architects.

Together with O'Neil Ford, Richard Stewart Colley (1910–1983) and planner Sam Zisman (1908-1970), he designed the headquarters of Texas Instruments in Richardson, Texas in 1958. Together, alongside Felix Candela (1910–1997), they also designed the industrial park for the Great Southwest Corporation in Arlington, Texas.

He continued a private architectural practise from 1955 to the late 1970s. During that time, he designed the United Presbyterian Homes, a housing project for needy children and the elderly in Waxahachie, Texas. He also designed a detention facility and a courthouse annex in Kerr County, Texas.

=== Personal life and death ===
He was married to Patsy Swank, a journalist.

He died on January 15, 1999, aged 85, in Dallas.
