= Martha Mood =

American artist (1908–1972)

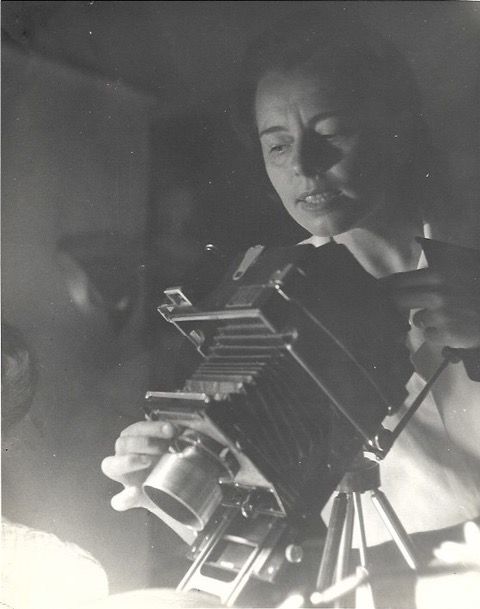
- Mood adjusting her camera. 1943. Hawaii
- Born: June 21, 1908; Oakland, California, U.S.
- Died: July 15, 1972 (aged 64); Helotes, Texas, U.S.
- Education: University of California, Berkeley; California College of Arts and Crafts
- Known for: Stitchery, ceramic work, sculpture, photography
- Style: Modern Art
- Spouse(s): John Homsy (1931–1946); Beaumont Mood (1947-1966); Edgar Lehmann (1968-1972)
- Awards: Artist of the Year, 1967, San Antonio Art League

Martha Mood (June 21, 1908 – July 15, 1972) was an American artist who is known for her stitchery and textile works and for being one of the first artists to raise the craft to the status of fine art in the United States. She is also known for her work in ceramics and as a photographer.

== Biography ==
Mood was born in Oakland, California, to German immigrant parents who owned a bakery. She spent her childhood and early adult years in the Bay Area. When she was seven years old, her family moved to San Rafael, CA, where she attended St. Rafael's Roman Catholic parochial school and Dominican College High School. She enrolled at the University of California, Berkeley, in 1926, where she studied a broad range of art subjects, as well as architecture, music and languages, graduating in 1931. In 1929, Mood took a year off from UC Berkeley to attend the California College of Arts and Crafts in Oakland to study anatomy, pen-and-ink, and outdoor sketching.

After college, Martha Mood engaged in painting, sculpture, toy production, and photography. She married John Homsy, her first husband, from 1931 to 1946. The Homsys had two daughters, Ann Homsy Woodward (teacher and ceramicist) and Susan Homsy Bragstad (architect). In 1940, the family moved from California to Hawaii, where Martha worked as a photographer.

Martha was married to Beaumont Mood, her second husband, from 1947 to 1966. The Moods lived in Dallas, Texas, for five years. While on a photographic tour of Texas, Martha and Beaumont were in a serious car accident. Martha almost lost her life and she required numerous surgeries over the next two years to repair extensive facial injury. In 1952, the Moods moved to the San Antonio, Texas. Martha Mood taught art in San Antonio public schools and at the San Antonio Art Institute. Following a ceramics class, she produced sculptures and architectural fixtures. Mood began experimentation with stitchery, also known as appliqué tapestry, in the early 1950s. By 1959, at the age of 51, stitchery had developed into Mood's primary artistic medium. She was an award-winning artist who was named the Artist of the Year for 1967 by the San Antonio Art League.

Martha was married to Edgar Lehmann, her third husband, from 1968 until her death. She died of cancer at her home in Helotes, Texas in 1972.

== Artistic works ==
=== In stitchery and textiles ===
Stitchery developed out of the practices of the utilitarian and decorative crafts of quilt making, applique, and embroidery. In the 1960s stitchery became recognized as an art form. Martha Mood applied modern art principals to her work. She rejected conservative values (such as the realistic depiction of subjects and precise embroidery), was innovative, experimented with form (the shapes, colors, and lines that make up the work) with a tendency to abstraction, and emphasized material, technique, and process. Mood produced works in many different styles including abstract, primitive, semi-realistic, and Cubist.

Mood detailed the process of stitchery creation in "Make an Applique Stitchery," an article in the October 1962 House Beautiful magazine. She provided instructions for composition, subject matter, materials and yarns, color arrangement, construction, embroidery stitches, inspiration and creativity. Mood wrote, "Its primary requirements are a seeing eye, an open mind, a little courage, and a craftsman's feel for the medium."

The construction of stitcheries was a three-part process; first the background was created, then applique forms were attached, and finally the detail stitching and the defining of the shapes completed the process. When adding detail and embellishing her work, Mood used a few simple stitches, including cross-stitch, running stitch and daisy stitch. Her choice of material and yarn was based on design, color, and texture. She used textured material, including heavy upholstery, primitive sacking materials, delicate linens, silks, recycled fabric, and clothing. Mood used a variety of yarns, threads, and twines for the embroidery to complement the fabric appliques.

Martha Mood created over 500 stitcheries between 1959 and 1972. She usually stitched her signature at the bottom of her pieces, "Martha Mood". Following her marriage to Ed Lehmann in 1968, she signed the pieces "Martha Mood L". Mood's agent, Lester K. Henderson, owned the copyright of many her stitcheries and these pieces are noted by "c. LKH 1972." After Mood's death, Lester Henderson had dye transfer reproductions made of 34 stitcheries at the Manufactura de Tapecarias de Portalegre workshop in Portugal. Henderson and Shirley Koploy wrote two books about Mood's life and work: The Sublime Heritage of Martha Mood, vol. 1 (The Story of Martha Mood, Her Stitchery and the Tapestries Woven from Her Stitchery Design) and vol. 2 (A Seeing Eye).

=== In ceramics ===
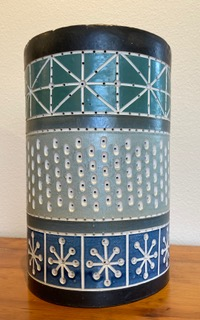
Light fixture designed by Martha and Beaumont Mood

Martha Mood created ceramic sculptures, panels and murals. The subject matter of her ceramic work was typically animals or human figures. In 1957, when notable Texan architect O'Neil Ford was looking for an artist to make light fixtures for his work, he met Martha Mood at her solo ceramic sculpture exhibit in San Antonio. Ford commissioned her to design ceramic fixtures for homes and buildings that he designed. To produce the ceramic fixtures, Martha and Beaumont Mood formed the Martha and Beaumont Mood Lighting company. Martha developed the designs for the fixtures while Beau made the molds, mixed the clay, and cast the pieces.

The light fixtures were generally spherical or cylindrical while sconces were often semi-circular or three-sided. They came in a variety of motifs and color palettes ranging from earth-toned desert hues (pale blue and sage green) to highly saturated colors (bright red, yellow, and blue). The fixtures were perforated with hundreds of tiny holes from which the light shined through and small lined designs formed patterns.

Martha and Beaumont Mood Fixtures can be found at Trinity University, Saint Mary's Hall Prep School, the Denton, Texas municipal buildings, Texas Instruments Semiconductor Building in Dallas, Johnson City Post Office, the Bill Miller BBQ restaurant, the Scribner Library at Skidmore College in Saratoga, NY, as well as mid-century modern homes and structures in Denton, Dallas, Austin, Houston and San Antonio.

=== In photography ===
Martha Mood worked as a photographer from 1931 to 1946. She took photographs for several books, including:

- Parents and Children Go to School by Dorothy Baruch, 1939
- Looking at Honolulu Through the Camera by Martha Homsy, 1942
- This is Hawaii: A Collection of Fine Photographs by Hawaii's Leading Cameramen, 1944 (Editor)
- The Hula: The Dance and Its Meaning, 1944
- The Hula: Dance Lessons with 72 Photos, 1954
- Fishermen and Workers in the Fields.

== Exhibitions ==
Martha Mood's works have been exhibited in approximately 20 cities in the United States. She participated in more than 30 one- and two-person shows. Exhibitions include:

- Ceramic Exhibition at the Witte Museum, San Antonio, TX, January 1957
- Stitchery Exhibition at the Witte Museum, San Antonio, TX, May 1967
- A Sudden Rush of Wings: The Work of Martha Mood Lehmann. The University of Texas Medical School at San Antonio. November 12–26, 1972
- Traveling exhibition of 38 Mood stitcheries, including the Leigh Yawkey Woodson Art Museum, Wausau, Wisconsin; and the Marion Koogler McNay Art Museum, San Antonio. 1975
- A League of Women: Women Artists for the SAALM Permanent Collection 1950–Present. San Antonio Art League, 2024
- Stitchery Exhibition at the Wichita Art Institute, Kansas

=== Collections ===
Mood's artwork has been found in private collections, public installations, and museums. Private collectors include: Lyndon B. Johnson, John Connally, Winthrop Rockefeller, Clint Murchison, O'Neil Ford, and Charles Urschel. Public installations include: Rice University, the San Antonio Country Club, the Margarite B. Parker Memorial Chapel at Trinity University, the U.S.I.A. Building in Washington, D.C., and St. Mary's Hall. Mood created altar cloths, vestments, and banners for churches in Texas and Mexico. Museums housing Mood's works include the Museum of Fine Arts Houston, McNay Art Museum, and the San Antonio Art League and Museum.
