= Piero Gemelli =

Italian photographer and artist

Piero Gemelli (born 1952) is an Italian photographer and artist.

== Life and work ==
Gemelli was born in Rome. He studied architecture and taught photography and advertising at the European Institute of Design until 1982. As a photographer, he started out creating advertising images and programs in multivision. In 1982, Gemelli moved to Milan where he worked for Vogue Italia and other international magazines. He opened a studio in Milan in 1987.

Gemelli has displayed his work in exhibitions worldwide and it has been credited in various articles and publications. In 1987, he received a Merit Award for Magazine Features. He also wrote a book Piero Gemelli Fotografie 1983–1993.

Today Gemelli works between Milan, Paris, and New York City. In addition to his photographic work, he works as art director, exposition planning consultant, and video and commercials director.

== Publications ==
- Piero Gemelli: Photographs 1983–1993. Art Studio/Idea, 1993. With an introduction by Natalia Aspesi
- Piero Gemelli: Photographs and Stories. 2021. Edited by Maria Vittoria Baravelli. With essays by Riccardo Falcinelli, Emanuele Coccia, Emiliano Ponzi, Carla Sozzani, Antonio Mancinelli, Carrie Scott, Ettore Molinario, Alessandro Calascibetta and Maria Savarese.

== Exhibitions ==
- 20 anni di VogueItalia 1964–1984, Milan, 1985
- À propos de la photographie italienne, Musée de l'Elysée, Lausanne, 1992
- Idea Progettata-fotografie 1983–1993, Milan, 1994
- Lo sguardo Italiano – fotografie di moda dal 1951 a oggi, Rotonda della Besana, Milan, 2005
- Dettagli di Moda, Villa Filippini-Besana Brianza, October 2009
- W(H)O-MAN, MyOwnGallery, Milan, January 2010
