= Toni LaSelle =

American artist

Dorothy Antoinette (Toni) LaSelle
- LaSelle on the beach in Provincetown, MA, summer 1946
- Born: 1901; Beatrice, Nebraska
- Died: 2002 (aged 100–101); Denton, Texas
- Known for: Painting

Dorothy Antoinette (Toni) LaSelle (1901–2002) was an American modernist artist, university professor, and art historian.

== Biography ==
Toni LaSelle was born in 1901 in the prosperous farming community of Beatrice, Nebraska. She was her "family's seventh child, the first one born in the twentieth century." LaSelle earned a BA from Nebraska Wesleyan University in 1923 and an MA in art history from the University of Chicago in 1926. Following her graduate studies, LaSelle traveled abroad throughout Europe before pursuing further postgraduate studies at the San Francisco School of Design and the Chicago Bauhaus. She studied at the Hans Hofmann School of Art: New York City in Provincetown, Massachusetts.

LaSelle was an instructor at the State Teachers College in Terre Haute, Indiana, from 1925 to 1927. From 1926 to 1927, She was the Acting Head of the Art Department at Stevens College, in Columbia, Missouri. LaSelle taught at Texas Woman's University (TWU) from 1928 to 1972, where she was responsible for developing the art history program. During the summers of 1929 and 1930, she was an art instructor at University of Arkansas-Fayetteville.

LaSelle helped lead students in the installation of stained-glass in the Little Chapel in the Woods project from 1938 to 1941. She became a full professor at TWU in 1941. LaSelle had solo exhibitions in New York City in 1950, Fort Worth in 1954, and Dallas in 1963. She attended the Provincetown Art Circle from 1946 to 1992, and retired from TWU in 1972. LaSelle's body of work is held in several collections, including of the Museum of Fine Arts, Houston; the Amon Carter Museum of American Art, Dallas; the Modern Art Museum of Fort Worth; and the Dallas Museum of Art (DMA).

LaSelle died in Denton, Texas, in 2002 at the age of 100.

== Early life and education ==
Although she grew up on the family farm raising dairy cattle and keeping honeybees, LaSelle was exposed to art at a young age, stating “I can still remember my first art lesson in the first grade.” LaSelle also had two sisters and an aunt who were artists, but her artistic desires soon outgrew what the town of Beatrice could offer. Following what proved to be an eye-opening lecture and public sculpture demonstration by sculptor Lorado Taft of Chicago, LaSelle sought out higher education to satisfy her academic and artistic desires.

While attending Nebraska Wesleyan University in Lincoln, LaSelle majored in English, minored in Science, and also studied art, literature, zoology, geology, and psychology. This is where she discovered Post-Impressionism and Cubism. A pivotal moment in her art career came when she was a senior and learned about, through a new art teacher, the landmark 1913 Armory Show in New York and its European modernist artists.

During her graduate studies at the University of Chicago in 1926, LaSelle had to work to financially support herself through school while studying under Walter Sargent and frequenting the Art Institute of Chicago for inspiration. It was during this time that LaSelle wrote her thesis on the indigenous masks of New Guinea in the Field Museum collection and their influence on the development of Cubism in Paris.

Following graduate school, LaSelle traveled abroad for six months to England, Spain, Italy, and France, seeking inspiration in its people, art, and architecture, sketching studies in France and Italy before returning to academia to teach.

== Career and Later Life ==
Toni LaSelle's deep interest and engagement with the tradition of European modernism was a defining factor in her artistic development and output. From 1928-1972, LaSelle was an art instructor and professor at The College of Industrial Arts (CIA [currently known as Texas Women's University]),while simultaneously engaging with the burgeoning concepts and processes of modernism as part of her own intellectual and artistic pursuit. Laselle played a pivotal role in adding much needed art history courses to Texas Woman’s University’s (TWU) curriculum, and in the oversight of student object and stained-glass design and development for the historic Little Chapel in the Woods. Toni Laselle was one of The Forgotten Nine, named after nine Denton and TWU based woman artists who not only pioneered the Modernist movement in the area, but had a notable impact on the movement in general, even though they were largely overshadowed by prominent male artists during the 1920-1960s.

During sabbaticals from teaching and summer breaks, LaSelle sought out her own teachers and mentors, the most influential being European émigrés Hans Hofmann and Lázló Moholy-Nagy. LaSelle's reputation grew within her region, and she became an acknowledged expert on the new trends in art, periodically giving museum lectures on Hofmann, Moholy-Nagy as well as other European artists such as Piet Mondrian, Jean Dubuffet, and Pablo Picasso. In 1942 Moholy-Nagy traveled to Texas to teach workshops for LaSelle's students, and she subsequently studied with Moholy-Nagy and Gyorgy Kepes at the Chicago Bauhaus in the summers of 1942 and 1943. Additionally, LaSelle was instrumental in organizing a show at the Dallas Museum of Art (DMA) for Hofmann in 1947.

LaSelle had several personal exhibits and spoken engagements for the DMA throughout her life and has exhibits that are still traveling today. She worked at Texas Woman's University until she retired in 1972 and stayed a pillar of the community until her death in 2002.

== Exhibitions ==
One of Toni LaSelle’s most notable solo exhibitions was in 1950 at the Pinacotheca (Rose Fried Gallery) in New York. Although the exhibition was reviewed more favorably for a woman artist than any other at its time at the Rose Fried Gallery, LaSelle never gained the notoriety of her male counterparts. In 1959 the Fort Worth Art Center held a retrospective of LaSelle's work. In 2018 LaSelle was featured in the Frieze Masters Spotlight of the Frieze Art Fair in London, with curator Carrie Scott stating "Overlooked during her own lifetime by art historical cannons mostly because of her gender, LaSelle's work is a stellar example of the vitality of non-objective painting at midcentury". In 2021 the Inman Gallery in Houston hosted Toni LaSelle: A State of Becoming. JC Gallery in London ran a show of her work, Toni LaSelle - Twenty One Trees, in 2025.

A list of all LaSelle’s solo and group exhibitions can be found on the Dorothy Antoinette LaSelle Foundation website.

== Exhibitions ==
One of Toni LaSelle’s most notable solo exhibitions was in 1950, at the Pinacotheca (Rose Fried Gallery) in New York. Although the exhibition was reviewed more favorably for a woman artist than any other at its time at the Rose Fried Gallery, LaSelle never gained the notoriety of her male counterparts. In 1959 the Fort Worth Art Center held a retrospective of LaSelle's work. In 2018, LaSelle was featured in the Frieze Masters Spotlight of the Frieze Art Fair in London, with curator Carrie Scott stating, "Overlooked during her own lifetime by art historical cannons mostly because of her gender, LaSelle's work is a stellar example of the vitality of non-objective painting at midcentury".[12] In 2021, the Inman Gallery in Houston hosted Toni LaSelle: A State of Becoming.[7] JC Gallery in London ran a show of her work, Toni LaSelle - Twenty One Trees, in 2025.[13]

A comprehensive list of LaSelle’s solo and group exhibitions can be found on the Dorothy Antoinette LaSelle Foundation website.

Notable Solo Exhibitions

Dorothy LaSelle: Drawings, Dallas Museum of Fine Arts, Dallas, TX, March 14 – April 4, 1948

Toni LaSelle: Paintings and Drawings, Texas State College for Women (now Texas Woman’s University), Denton, TX, January 13 – February 4, 1952

Selected Works – Various Media, Art Building Galleries, Texas Woman’s University, Denton, TX, February 5 – 26, 1961

Notable Group Exhibitions

Art of the Americas: Pre-Columbian and Contemporary, Dallas Museum of Fine Arts, Dallas, TX, June 12 - October 31, 1937

Fourth Annual Texas Print Exhibition, Dallas Museum of Fine Arts, Dallas, TX, November 26, 1944 – January 2, 1945

2nd Southwestern Exhibition of Prints and Drawings, Dallas Museum of Fine Arts, Dallas, TX, March 6 – 27, 1949
