= Trailblazer (monorail) =

Suspended monorail in Texas

Overview
- Owner: Monorail, Inc
- Locale: Fair Park, Dallas, Texas
- Transit type: Monorail
- Number of lines: 1
- Number of stations: 2

Operation
- Began operation: 1956
- Ended operation: 1964
- Operator(s): Texas Skyways, Inc
- Number of vehicles: 1

Technical
- System length: 1,600 ft (490 m)

Trailblazer was a suspended monorail that operated at Fair Park in Dallas, Texas from 1956 to 1964. It was the first commercially operated monorail system in the United States.

== History ==
Envisioned as a demonstration project for transit solutions, Monorail, Inc. erected a short test system in Houston's Arrowhead Park as the Skyway Line in 1956. During the year, the company contracted with the State Fair of Texas for an expanded project at Fair Park in Dallas. Originally envisioned to be 4,000 feet (1,200 m) long with terminals at the Automobile Building and Pennsylvania Avenue (with a midway station at Cotton Bowl Plaza), the line was later reduced to 1,600 feet (490 m) terminating at the Cotton Bowl. It was completely funded and constructed by Monorail, Inc and operated as a fairgrounds concession by Texas Skyways, Inc — making it the nation's first commercial operating monorail line Most of the materials (including the vehicle) were repurposed from the Houston test project. It opened with a fare of 25 cents in time for the 1956 State Fair of Texas, and became a top visitor attraction.

It also made an appearance in the 1962 musical film State Fair, which was filmed in Fair Park.

== Service and operations ==
A 51-passenger vehicle—named Trailblazer—was built of light-blue fiberglass and powered by two Packard 352 gasoline engines. A two-man crew operated the system, with the driver sitting above the passenger compartment atop one of two bogies. Trailblazer was supported by 30-foot (9.1 m)-high inverted J-shaped steel towers spaced 100 feet (30 m) apart. The suspended vehicle ran 18 feet (5.5 m) above the ground on pneumatic tires with a maximum speed of ten miles per hour (16 km/h), but the speed of the system at Fair Park was limited by the acceleration possible between stations.

The monorail operated for several years during the State Fair of Texas, and year-round on weekends. The system became a showcase of transportation technology for Dallas and for Monorail, Inc, attracting the attention of urban planners and city leaders from around the world. Thirty months after installation, the system had attracted 50,000 riders and, by the end of its life, it had carried over 1,000,000 people.

In April 1958, a small fire caused the evacuation of Trailblazer, but the six passengers and two crew members escaped unharmed.

The system was closed in 1964 due to its diminishing novelty and increasing maintenance requirements, and was replaced by the Swiss Sky Ride. The track was dismantled and the vehicle was scheduled to be retired to the Goodell Monorail Museum in Houston. Several years later, however, the monorail vehicle was found in a salvage yard. It was purchased and moved to the town of Wills Point, Texas, where it remains today, having been converted to a residence.
