= Little Chapel in the Woods =

Coordinates: 33.229372°N 97.128818°W

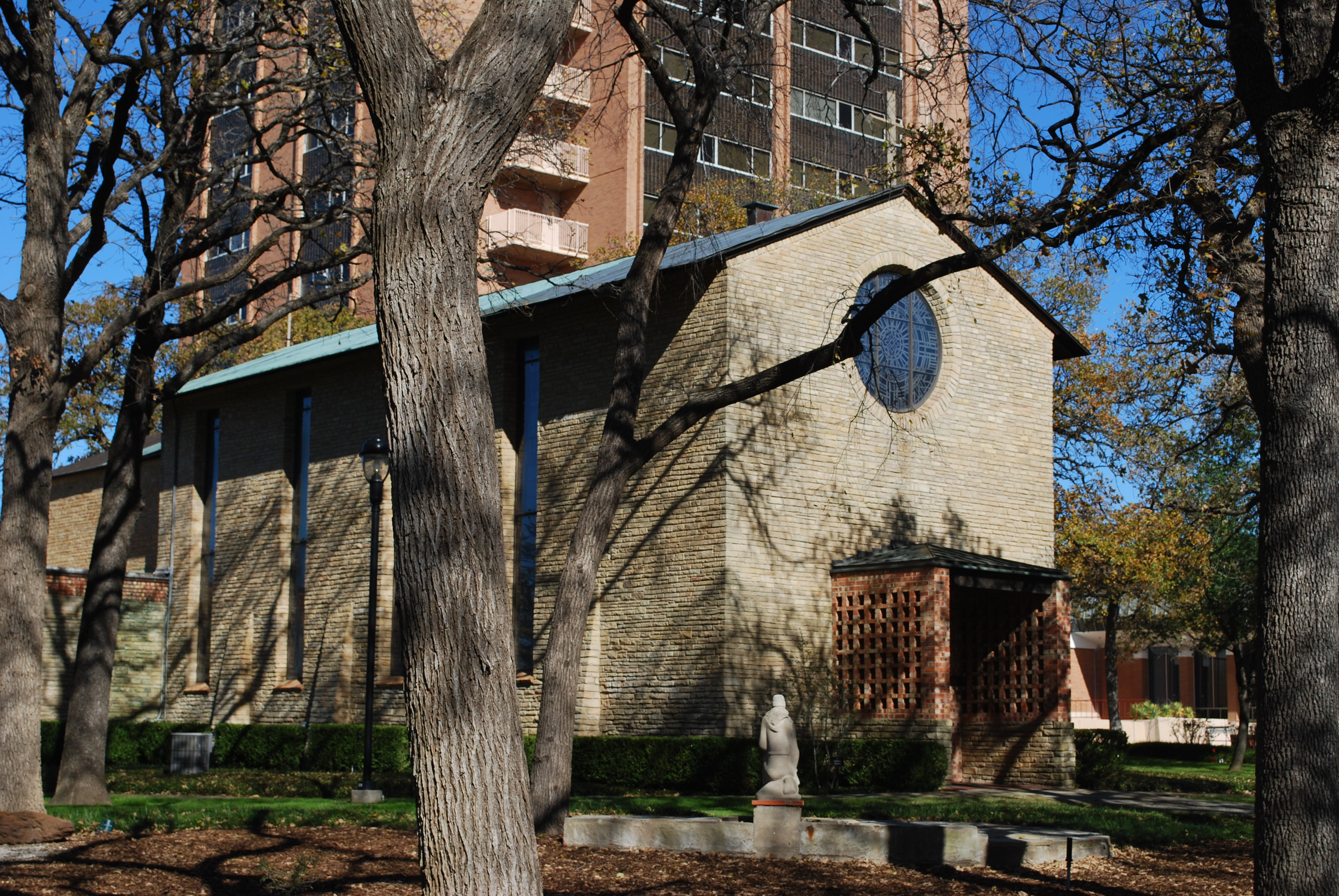
Little Chapel in the Woods in Denton, Texas

The Little Chapel-in-the-Woods is the campus chapel at Texas Woman's University in Denton, Texas.

== History ==
Built during the Great Depression, Little Chapel has been named one of Texas’ most outstanding architectural achievements. Designed by leading American architect and Denton resident O'Neill Ford with Arch B. Swank Jr. and Preston Geren Sr., recruits from the National Youth Administration (NYA) constructed the building. Dorothy LaSelle, Associate Professor of art at Texas State College for Women (now Texas Woman’s University), served as director of the Chapel Arts Projects. LaSelle supervised more than three hundred students in the design and execution of all of the artwork in the Chapel, including the stained glass windows, lighting, woodwork, doors, ceiling beams, and flooring.

The chapel received fame on November 1, 1939, when First Lady and NYA advocate Eleanor Roosevelt dedicated the Little Chapel. Mary Kathryn Jones, Student Body President, Class of 1940, introduced her to the crowd that had gathered for the dedication.

Since its completion in 1939, the chapel has been used by many as a place of worship, meditation, and celebration.

== Weddings ==
The first wedding in the Little Chapel took place on September 25, 1939 between Esther Webb (a 1933 Girls Industrial College graduate) and John Hauseman. The couple is listed in the TWU Bride’s Book which now holds the names of every couple to be wed in the chapel since.

Over 100 weddings take place each year within the little chapel.

The Little Chapel provides a wedding ceremony package that includes the majority of the Chapel's services. Those services include: the use of the piano and organ, LED candles along window ledges, Candelabras, 25 Pews with 22 on the ground and 3 in the balcony, pew clips that are brown and clear, Unity candle stands, access to sound system and aux cord, and a Chapel attendant who is present at the rehearsal and the ceremony. Each wedding has a three hour time block on the day of the wedding and one hour of rehearsal time any day before the ceremony. The Chapel provides a two hour use of the Little Chapel and the connected garden for portraits on any day before the ceremony. There are two separate changing rooms in the chapel that are ready for use behind the altar. When facing the altar, the left changing room is larger with a full-length mirror, a large vanity, and chairs for a bridal party and immediate family. The right one is smaller but has seating and a restroom inside the room.

Texas Women's University has begun a project, called the Bridal Book, in which they created a book of everyone who has been married in the Little Chapel from 1939 to present day. The book also keeps a record of those who had commitment ceremonies in the Chapel. In 2001, a new book was commissioned by TWU Chancellor and President Dr. Ann Stuart as part of Texas Women’s University's 100th anniversary. The original book contains no pictures, just thousands of names and couples who were married between 1939 and 1979 in the Little Chapel. There is currently an effort to capture the names of brides married in the Little Chapel between 1980 and 2000. The book is currently available in PDF format and listed by years through the Texas Woman’s University Archives. The physical book is located in the Blagg-Huey Library in the Women’s Collection Vault.

== Awards and recognition ==
Best Of ZOLA for 2025 and 2026

Architectural Landmark Award of 2021 by the Texas Society of Architects

2014, 2015, 2016, 2017, 2018, 2019, 2020, 2021, 2022, 2023, 2024, and 2025 Little Chapel voted the "Best Wedding Venue" by Denton County

2009 - Little Chapel named as one of the 10 best buildings in the state of Texas by Texas Monthly

1983 - Little Chapel named one of the 20 buildings representing "Texas Proudest Architectural Achievements of All Time" by the Texas Society of Architects"

Among the artists who contributed to The Little Chapel in the Woods were nine women artists known as "The Forgotten Nine.” Their names, as well as the area of their contributions, are listed below:

Carlotta Corpron - photographic records

Dorothy Antoinette “Toni” LaSelle - Supervisor of brass work, Stained Glass

Mattie Lee Lacy - Mosaics

Thetis Lemmon - Brass work, Front doors

Mary Marshall - Mosaics

Marjorie Baltzel - Wood carving

Edith Brisac - Mosaics, Vestibule floor

Marie Isly Dellaney - Stencil painting

Coreen Mary Spellman - Stencil painting, Assistant Stained Glass.

In the years since its dedication, the Chapel has undergone no major renovation or refurbishment.

“The chapel is not limited to students and alums, and for a lot of people, this is the only time they spend on campus,” Dr. Richard Nicholas says.” The Chapel, both the history and the beauty of it, is something to share.

== Stained glass windows ==
The stained glass windows found inside the Little Chapel were designed to the theme "Women Ministering to the Human Needs." Each window pays respect to women in that particular profession. Graduate student Beatrice Paschall supervised the careful design and construction of each window. The stained glass windows found inside the Little Chapel were designed to the theme "Women Ministering to the Human Needs." Each window pays respect to women in that particular profession. Graduate student Beatrice Paschall supervised the careful design and construction of each window.

The Motherhood Window sits directly over the altar and symbolizes woman as Mother. It is the largest of all the windows in the chapel and the most prominent in position. The illustrations found within the stained glass represent ideals derived from the Biblical conception of motherhood found in Proverbs. These include spiritual strength, desire, leadership, kindness, loyalty and love. This window is designed in three panels with motifs at the top, middle, and bottom. The panels illustrate ideas derived from the Biblical conception of the mother in the characterizing words of King Lemuel Proverbs Two yukka borders extend from base to top on either side of the figures. They symbolize vitality of the heart and mind, and the resilience of the spirit in women.

The Nursing Window is dedicated to woman as nurse. This window pays homage to all of the women who paved the road toward modern day nursing. The large figure in the center of the window represents the ideal nurse: the women of history whose life work was establishing the service of nursing, the second symbol representing medical care and nursing on the Texas Woman’s University campus, and third, a large central figure representing the ideal or universal nurse. Historical figures represented in the window are Florence Nightingale, the founder of modern nursing, and Clara Barton, the founder of the International Red Cross.

The Teaching Window is dedicated to woman as teacher. The window pays homage to all of the women who used their knowledge as a tool to educate the minds of others. The central figure represents Helen Keller and her teacher Anne Sullivan. The theme of the Teaching Window can be found at the bottom with a representation of the five senses that become our feelings and understanding. Four senses are depicted as asleep, while the fifth sense is rousing to consciousness. Above the depiction of the senses is Mary Lyon, founder of Mt. Holyoke, holding a replica of the main building.

The Music Window is dedicated to woman and her achievement through music. The inscription at the base of the window reads "Gloria in Excelsis Deo". The window depicts a scene of the organist, the mother singing the lullaby to her child, the choirs, the girls playing cello, horn, and violin, and the girl singing in an operatic role. All these suggest the variety of ways women express themselves through music.

The Dance Window presents woman as she has followed her desire to find an expression of beauty through movement. There are three historical figures presented: the first is Isadora Duncan, surrounded by figures representing more formal and conservative forms of dance, of which she rebelled. The second, Ruth St. Denis, whose work as a teacher is responsible for many present-day dancers. The third figure is central and symbolizes the ideals of modern dance.

The Science Window represents woman in the fields of chemistry, physics and the biological sciences. There are three figures in this window dedicated to women who have made contributions to the world through science. The two figures at the bottom represent physics and chemistry, and the figure above represents biological sciences. The large central figure is a laboratory technician.

The Social Service Window pays homage to woman and her tireless effort to relieve distress and suffering wherever she has found it. Only two services to humankind have been depicted in this window. The first appears in the lower section, the woman’s work to improve living and working conditions through legislation, raise labor standards, promote safety measures, standardize wages, and limit child labor. The upper section represents women's efforts to promote understanding among all peoples of the world.

The Literature Window represents woman as writer. To represent all women poets, a quotation from the teachings of George Eliot reads, “O, may I join the choir invisible; Of those immortal dead who live again; In minds made better by their presence.” Three figures standing beside and above the inscription symbolize Lyric, Epic, and Dramatic poetry. Beside these are three masks whose expressions convey Wit, Satire, and Humor. The large central figure is Literature holding a page of her manuscript.

The Speech Window represents woman in the arts. This window depicts the embodiment of three divisions of the speech arts: Drama, Spoken Word for entertainment and instruction, and Speech for communication. The standing figure at the bottom represents the Renaissance actress Isabella Andreini and the women who can interpret both comic and tragic roles.

The Rose Window is located above the entrance to the chapel and serves as an abstraction reflecting woman’s joy in the physical world around her. The colors in this window represent the vivid colors of the Southwest, specifically the colors seen in nature throughout the state of Texas.

The Signature Window is a small window located in the vestibule that shows the builders, donors, and decorators of the chapel in characteristic pose. Graduate student Beatrice Paschall, under the supervision of local artist and Dentonite, Dorothy LaSelle, supervised the careful design and construction of each window. The windows were crafted by art students at TWU. These windows were created and installed between 1938 and 1941.
