= Van Zandt County Regional Airport =

Public airport in Texas, United States

- IATA: none; ICAO: none; FAA LID: 76F

Summary
- Airport type: Public
- Owner: City of Wills Point
- Serves: Wills Point, Texas
- Location: 36671 State Highway 64, Wills Point, TX 75169
- Elevation AMSL: 522.0 ft / 159.1 m
- Coordinates: 32°40′53″N 095°59′03″W
- Website: https://willspointtx.org/van-zandt-county-regional-airport-2/

Map

Runways
Direction	Length		Surface
Direction	ft	m	Surface
17/35	3,230	985	Asphalt

Statistics (2016)
- Aircraft operations: 4,800
- Based aircraft: 14
- Sources: Federal Aviation Administration unless noted otherwise

Van Zandt County Regional Airport (FAA LID: 76F) is a city-owned public airport in Wills Point, Van Zandt County, Texas, United States, located about 3.0 nautical miles (5.6 km) southeast of the central business district. The airport has no IATA or ICAO designation.

The facility was previously known as Wills Point Municipal Airport, but the name was changed following the late 2007 approval of a major airport improvement project.

The airport is used solely for general aviation purposes.

== Facilities ==
Van Zandt County Regional Airport covers 78 acres (32 ha) at an elevation of 522.0 feet (159.1 m) above mean sea level, and has one runway: Runway 17/35: 3,230 x 50 ft (985 x 15 m), surface: asphalt

For the 12-month period ending 17 May 2016, the airport had 4,800 aircraft operations, an average of 13 per day, all general aviation. At that time, 14 aircraft were based at this airport, 86% single-engined and 14% helicopters, with no multiengined, ultralight, jet, or glider aircraft.

== See also ==
- List of airports in Texas
