= Mary Blagg Huey =

American educator

Mary Blagg Huey (January 19, 1922 – June 27, 2017) was an American educator. She served as president of Texas Woman's University from 1976 to 1986.

She was born Mary Evelyn Blagg in Wills Point and was educated at North Texas High School, going on to earn a bachelor's degree in English and music and a master's degree in English literature from Texas State College for Women, a master's degree in public administration from the University of Kentucky and a PhD in political science from Duke University.

From 1943 to 1945, she taught English at the Texas State College for Women. She was assistant director of the Bureau of Public Administration at the University of Mississippi from 1946 to 1947. From 1947 to 1971, she was a member of the faculty of government at North Texas State University and, from 1971 to 1976, was dean of the graduate school at Texas Woman's University.

== Life and legacy ==
She married Griffin B. Huey, a dentist; the couple had one son. She died on June 27, 2017, at the age of 95.

In 1984, she was inducted into the Texas Women's Hall of Fame. Huey also received the Secretary of Defense Medal for Outstanding Public Service, the Otis Fowler Citizen of the Year Award and the Outstanding Women of Texas Award from the Texas division of the American Association of University Women.
