= Wills Point, Texas =

- City
- Nickname: The Bluebird Capital of Texas
- Location of Wills Point, Texas
- Coordinates: 32°42′21″N 95°59′12″W
- Country: United States
- State: Texas
- County: Van Zandt

Area
  - Total: 3.68 sq mi (9.53 km^{2})
  - Land: 3.66 sq mi (9.49 km^{2})
  - Water: 0.015 sq mi (0.04 km^{2})
- Elevation: 532 ft (162 m)

Population (2020)
  - Total: 3,747
  - Density: 1,020/sq mi (395/km^{2})
- Time zone: UTC-6 (Central (CST))
  - Summer (DST): UTC-5 (CDT)
- ZIP code: 75169
- Area code: 903
- FIPS code: 48-79564
- GNIS feature ID: 2412273
- Website: www.willspointtx.gov

Wills Point is a city in Van Zandt County, Texas, United States. Its population was 3,747 at the 2020 census.

== History ==
Founded in 1873, Wills Point derives its name from an early American settler, William Wills, who arrived in the area circa 1848. He purchased a cabin from Adam Sullivan in 1852. The name "point" may also derive from the shape of the original timberline near the cabin, though unsubstantiated arguments have indicated that the name relates to the area's elevation. The layout of the city was the work of engineer General Grenville M. Dodge of the California Construction Company. The downtown streets laid with red bricks upon packed sand in the 1920s by locals remain in use. Downtown Wills Point has many of its original buildings that are over 100 years old, including the Wills cabin, a drug store, a dry good store, and a law office.

Governor George W. Bush officially named Wills Point the Bluebird Capital of Texas in 1995.

The Majestic Movie theater was the oldest continuously operated movie theater in Texas run by a single family, operated by Karl C. Lybrand, Karl C. Lybrand Jr., and Karl C. Lybrand III from 1926 until its closure in 2010. The Bruce and Human Drug Company, built in 1879, was the oldest family-owned drug store in Texas; it closed in 2023.

Wills Point is also the final resting place for Trailblazer, the first commercially operated monorail system in the United States.

GFA World, a Christian missionary organization, is located seven miles outside the city.

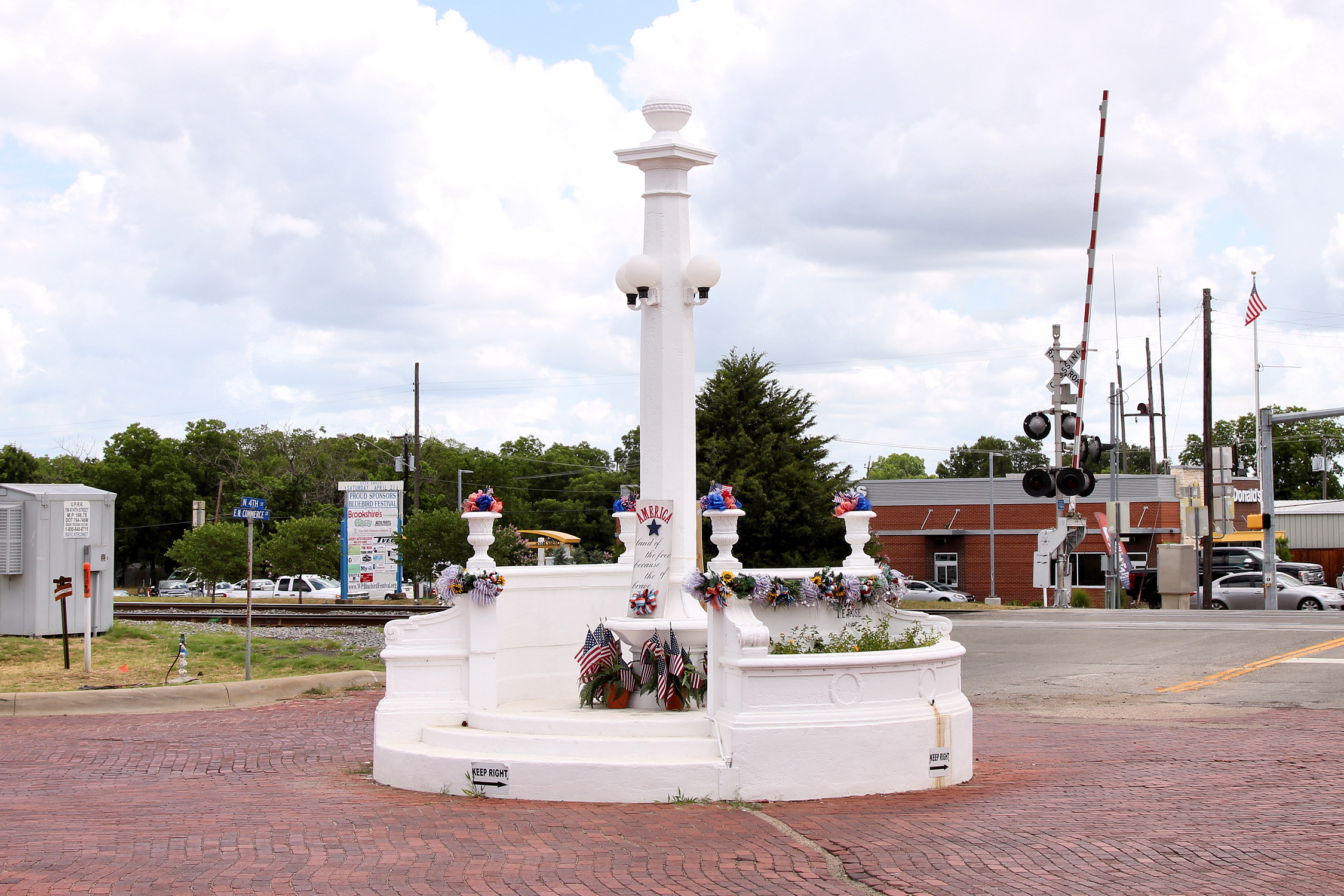
Rose Memorial

== Geography ==
According to the United States Census Bureau, the city has a total area of 3.6 square miles (9.3 km^{2}), all land.

=== Climate ===
The climate in this area is characterized by hot, humid summers and generally mild to cool winters. According to the Köppen climate classification, Wills Point has a humid subtropical climate, Cfa on climate maps.

Climate data for Wills Point, Texas (1991–2020 normals, extremes 1905–1923, 1939–present)
Month	Jan	Feb	Mar	Apr	May	Jun	Jul	Aug	Sep	Oct	Nov	Dec	Year
Record high °F (°C)	88 (31)	97 (36)	94 (34)	98 (37)	100 (38)	109 (43)	113 (45)	115 (46)	110 (43)	102 (39)	91 (33)	85 (29)	115 (46)
Mean maximum °F (°C)	74.0 (23.3)	77.7 (25.4)	82.1 (27.8)	85.6 (29.8)	90.9 (32.7)	95.3 (35.2)	100.6 (38.1)	102.1 (38.9)	97.5 (36.4)	90.6 (32.6)	81.3 (27.4)	75.6 (24.2)	103.1 (39.5)
Mean daily maximum °F (°C)	55.5 (13.1)	59.9 (15.5)	67.2 (19.6)	75.0 (23.9)	82.6 (28.1)	90.0 (32.2)	94.4 (34.7)	95.3 (35.2)	88.8 (31.6)	78.3 (25.7)	66.2 (19.0)	57.7 (14.3)	75.9 (24.4)
Daily mean °F (°C)	45.1 (7.3)	49.1 (9.5)	56.3 (13.5)	63.9 (17.7)	72.5 (22.5)	80.2 (26.8)	83.9 (28.8)	84.2 (29.0)	77.7 (25.4)	66.9 (19.4)	55.5 (13.1)	47.4 (8.6)	65.2 (18.4)
Mean daily minimum °F (°C)	34.8 (1.6)	38.3 (3.5)	45.4 (7.4)	52.8 (11.6)	62.5 (16.9)	70.4 (21.3)	73.4 (23.0)	73.0 (22.8)	66.5 (19.2)	55.4 (13.0)	44.8 (7.1)	37.1 (2.8)	54.5 (12.5)
Mean minimum °F (°C)	20.0 (−6.7)	23.9 (−4.5)	28.5 (−1.9)	37.8 (3.2)	47.6 (8.7)	61.3 (16.3)	67.3 (19.6)	66.3 (19.1)	53.4 (11.9)	39.5 (4.2)	28.6 (−1.9)	23.1 (−4.9)	17.0 (−8.3)
Record low °F (°C)	−1 (−18)	−3 (−19)	10 (−12)	22 (−6)	36 (2)	49 (9)	58 (14)	55 (13)	38 (3)	22 (−6)	13 (−11)	−2 (−19)	−3 (−19)
Average precipitation inches (mm)	3.40 (86)	3.59 (91)	4.24 (108)	3.67 (93)	4.85 (123)	3.88 (99)	2.25 (57)	2.64 (67)	3.29 (84)	4.79 (122)	3.94 (100)	4.09 (104)	44.63 (1,134)
Average precipitation days (≥ 0.01 in)	9.6	9.4	10.1	8.7	9.7	7.8	5.9	6.0	6.8	7.6	8.3	9.3	99.2
Source: NOAA

== Demographics ==
Historical population
Census	Pop.	Note	%±
1880	860		—
1890	1,025		19.2%
1900	1,347		31.4%
1910	1,398		3.8%
1920	1,811		29.5%
1930	2,023		11.7%
1940	1,976		−2.3%
1950	2,030		2.7%
1960	2,281		12.4%
1970	2,636		15.6%
1980	2,631		−0.2%
1990	2,986		13.5%
2000	3,496		17.1%
2010	3,524		0.8%
2020	3,747		6.3%
U.S. Decennial Census

=== 2020 census ===
As of the 2020 census, Wills Point had a population of 3,747, with a median age of 36.4 years; 27.4% of residents were under the age of 18 and 16.9% were 65 years of age or older. For every 100 females there were 87.8 males, and for every 100 females age 18 and over there were 84.3 males.

There were 1,388 households in Wills Point, of which 36.7% had children under the age of 18 living in them. Of all households, 43.3% were married-couple households, 16.5% were households with a male householder and no spouse or partner present, and 32.1% were households with a female householder and no spouse or partner present. About 26.6% of all households were made up of individuals and 13.7% had someone living alone who was 65 years of age or older.

There were 1,504 housing units, of which 7.7% were vacant. The homeowner vacancy rate was 2.5% and the rental vacancy rate was 5.2%.

0.0% of residents lived in urban areas, while 100.0% lived in rural areas.

Racial composition as of the 2020 census
Race	Number	Percent
White	2,705	72.2%
Black or African American	411	11.0%
American Indian and Alaska Native	39	1.0%
Asian	11	0.3%
Native Hawaiian and Other Pacific Islander	3	0.1%
Some other race	203	5.4%
Two or more races	375	10.0%
Hispanic or Latino (of any race)	572	15.3%

== Education ==
Wills Point and the surrounding unincorporated areas are served by the Wills Point ISD. As of 2006, the district has five schools: Wills Point Primary School (prekindergarten through first grade), E.O. Woods Intermediate School (grades 2-4), Wills Point Middle School (grades 5-6), Wills Point Jr. High (grades 7-8), and Wills Point High School (grages 9-12).

The Wills Point High School Tigers football team won the 1A state championship in 1965.

== Photo gallery ==
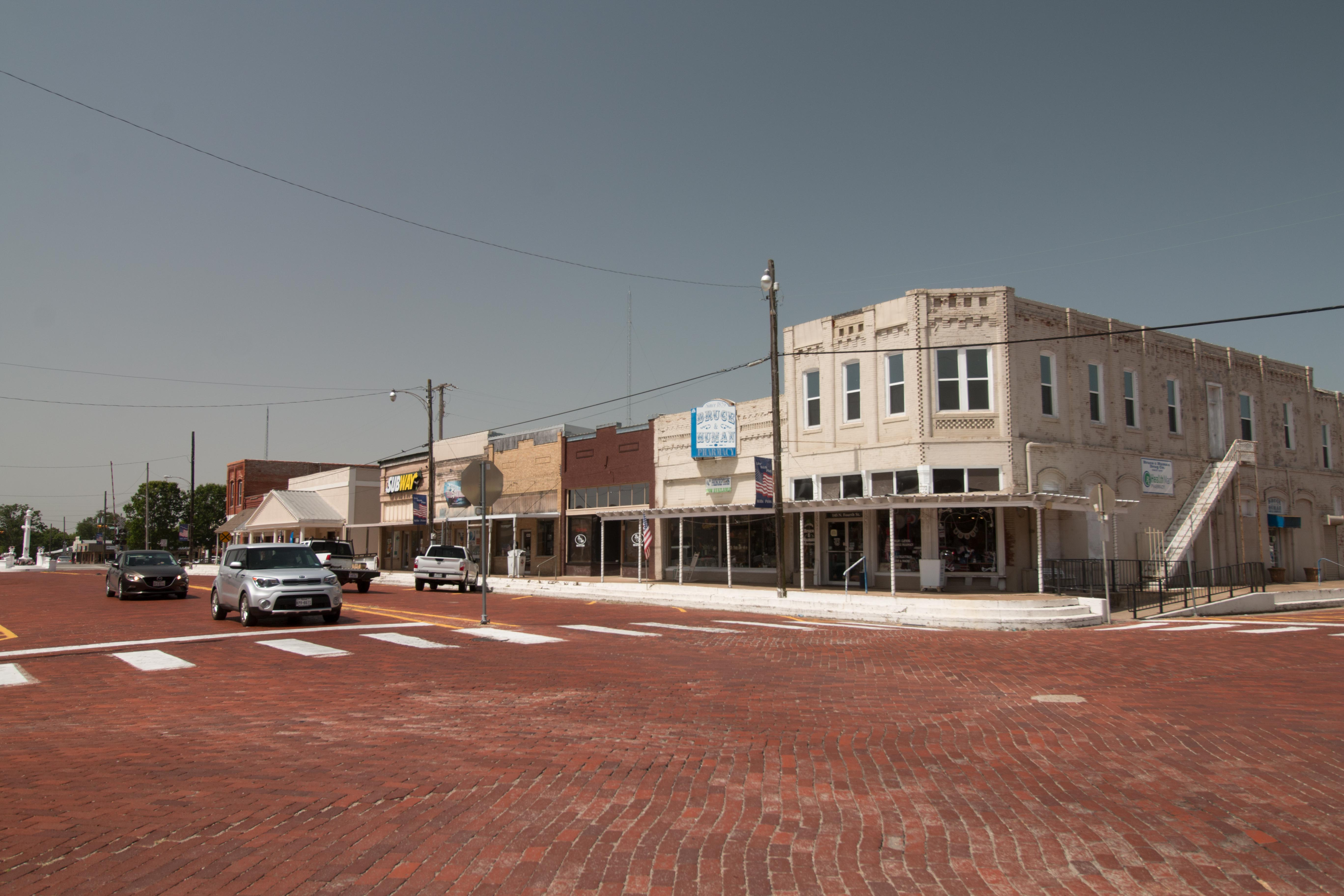
Downtown Wills Point

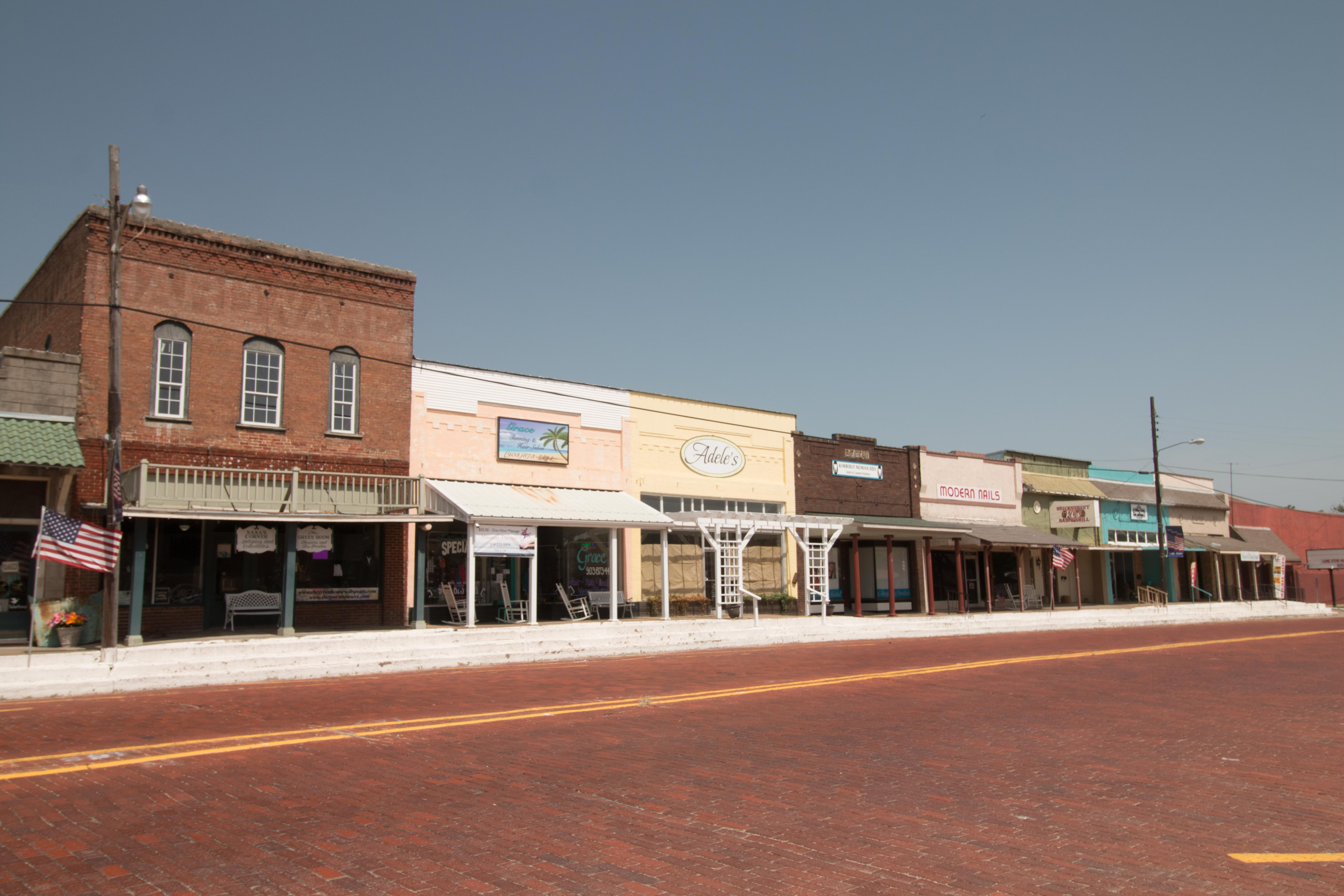
Downtown Wills Point

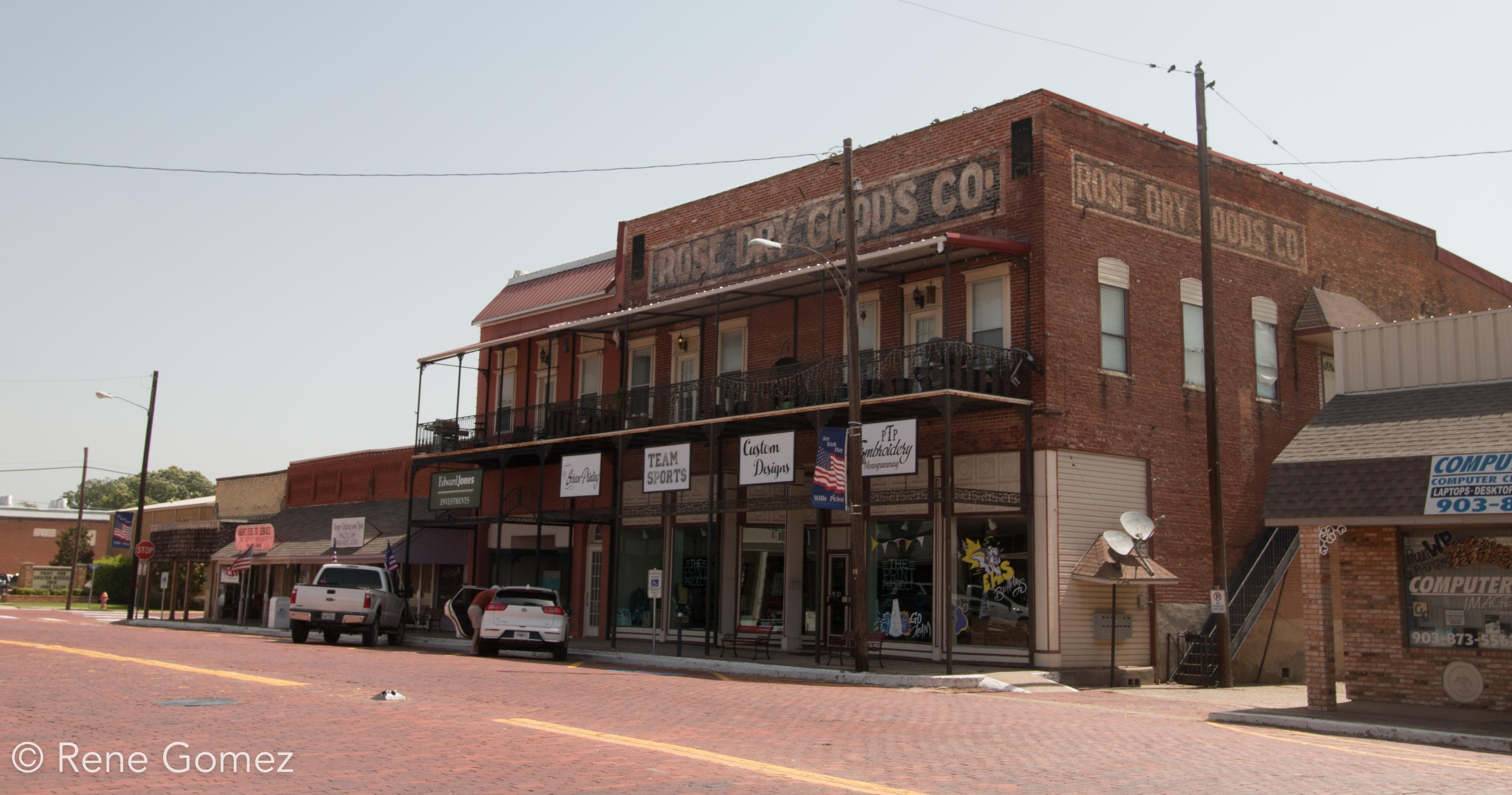
Rose Dry Goods

== Transportation ==
=== Major highways ===
- U.S. Highway 80
- State Highway 64

=== Airports ===
The city owns Van Zandt County Regional Airport, which was known as Wills Point Municipal Airport prior to the 2007 approval of a major airport improvement project.

=== Railroad ===
Union Pacific Railroad

== Notable people ==
- Harden Cooper, football player and coach
- Lloyd David Foster, country music singer
- Gibb Gilchrist, state highway engineer, dean of engineering and president of the Texas A&M University and the first chancellor of the Texas A&M University System
- Jack Gray (basketball), basketball player and coach at the University of Texas
- Chuck Howley, NFL linebacker for he Dallas Cowboys and Pro Football Hall of Fame inductee
- Mary Blagg Huey, educator, president of Texas Woman's University 1976-1986
- Constantine B. Kilgore, U.S. representative (1887-1895) and Texas senator (1884-1886)
- Jimmy LaFave, singer-songwriter and folk musician
- Robert M. Lively, U.S. representative (1910-1911)
- Henry Qualls, Texas and country blues guitarist and singer
- Ike Sewell, athlete, businessman, entrepreneur, and creator of Chicago-style pizza
- Arch B. Swank Jr., architect
- Lee 'Lasses' White, vaudeville pianist, songwriter and entertainer
- G. Carey Winfrey, thoroughbred racehorse owner and trainer
