= O'Neil Ford =

American architect

- Born: December 3, 1905; Pink Hill; Grayson County, Texas
- Died: July 20, 1982 (aged 76); San Antonio, Texas
- Occupation: Architect
- Awards: Fellow of the American Institute of Architects, appointed to the National Council on the Arts, National Historical Landmark
- Buildings: Tower of the Americas; Little Chapel in the Woods; Emily Fowler Public Library; The Selwyn School; First Christian Church, Denton
- Projects: La Villita; Saint Mary's Hall; Skidmore College; Trinity University; University of Texas at San Antonio

O'Neil Ford (December 3, 1905 – July 20, 1982) was an American architect of the mid-20th century in Texas. He is considered one of the nation's best unknown architects, and his designs merged the modernism of Europe with the indigenous qualities of early Texas architecture. In 1974 he was designated a National Historic Landmark by the National Council on the Arts, the only individual to ever be given that title.

== Biography ==
O'Neil Ford was born in Pink Hill, in Grayson County, Texas, in 1905. His family moved to Denton, in 1917 after the death of his father. He enrolled in North Texas State Teachers College (University of North Texas) for two years, but financial burdens forced him to abandon his efforts of a formal education. Instead, he earned an architectural certificate by mail from the International Correspondence Schools of Scranton, Pennsylvania.

In 1926, he began a long partnership with regional architects and was first mentored by architect David R. Williams. Together, they produced a number of fine regional houses of native brick, wood, and stone in north-central Texas. He entered into private practice in 1934 and worked with a series of partners within Texas beginning in 1936. His first residence designed in the modern style was at Turtle Creek Park in that year.

Ford was influenced by the tradition of the English Arts and Crafts movement and its attempt to combine architecture and visual arts. A strong preservationist, he helped launch Texas architecture on a new path by showing that its roots were deep and often beautiful. His well-crafted structures were composed of brick, glass, and wood, and were intimately tied to their settings. He enlisted his brother Lynn, a master carver and sculptor, to create custom doors, screens, and louvered grates. Ford contracted with local artist Martha Mood to produce light fixtures, fountains and wall hangings.

Ford was elected a Fellow of the American Institute of Architects in 1960. He was appointed to the National Council on the Arts by President Lyndon B. Johnson, and in 1974, Ford himself was designated a National Historic Landmark by the council (the only individual to ever be given that title). In 1967, he was elected into the National Academy of Design as an Associate Academician.

O'Neil Ford resided in San Antonio until his death in 1982 at age 76. His funeral was held on the campus of Trinity University in Margarite B. Parker Chapel, which he designed. In 2001, his drawings were donated by his widow, Wanda Graham Ford, to the Alexander Architectural Archive at the University of Texas at Austin. The gift included 5,540 original architectural drawings, 5,484 prints, 40 presentation drawings, 39 presentation sketches, and 63 sheets of photographic materials.

== Significant work ==
Ford designed several buildings in Denton, among them the Little Chapel in the Woods, renovations at the Emily Fowler Public Library, the Denton Civic Center, Denton's City Hall, and several buildings at the Selwyn School. Because his designs form much of Denton's identity, a Texas historical marker honoring Ford was dedicated at the Emily Fowler Library in 2009.

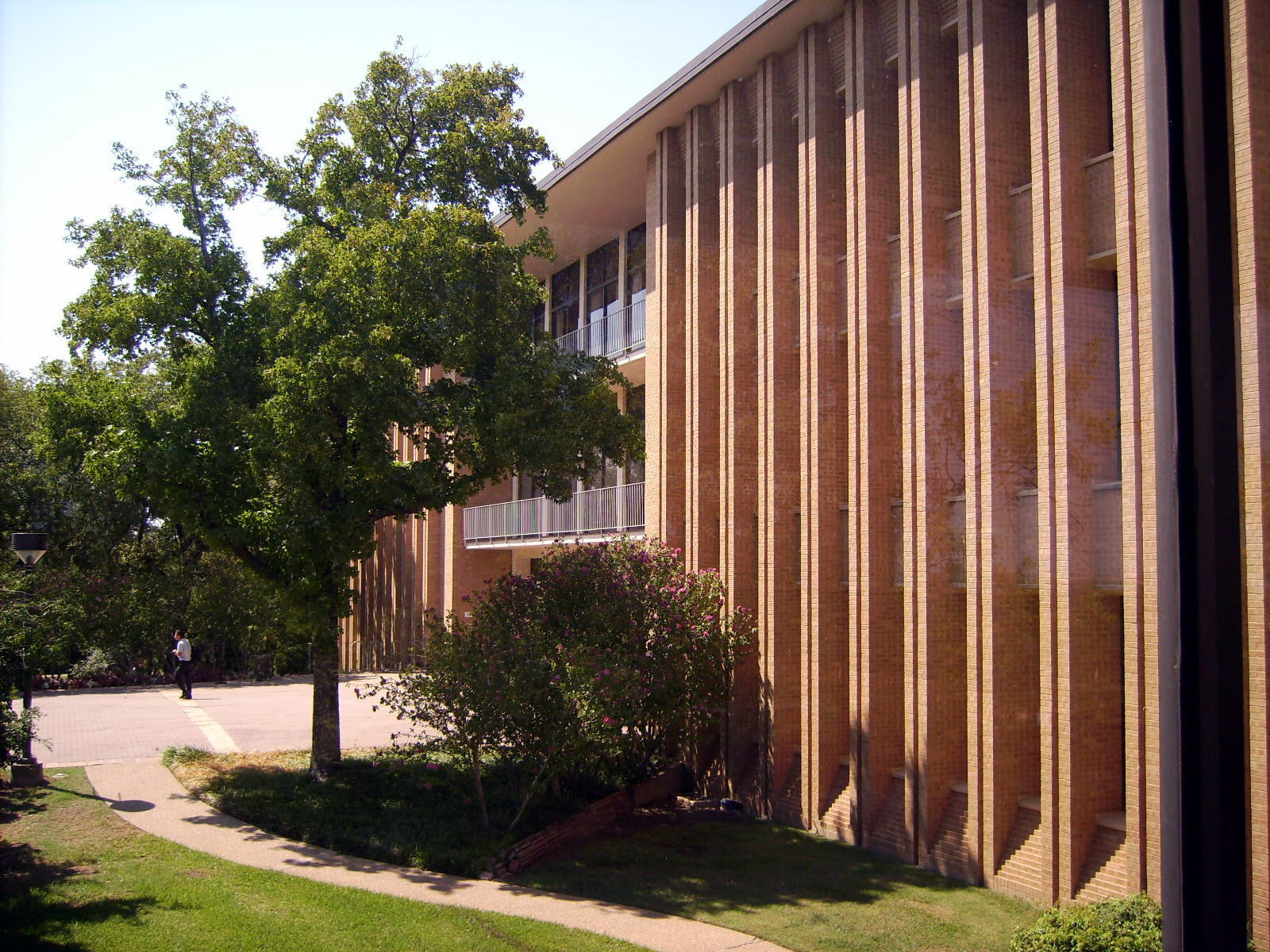
The Braniff Graduate Center on the campus of the University of Dallas in Irving, Texas: The building was designed by O'Neil Ford.

Other Dallas works by Ford include much of the University of Dallas campus in Irving, Texas. He designed the Braniff Memorial Tower, the Braniff Graduate Center, the Gorman Lecture Center, parts of the art village, the Haggar University Center, and the Haggerty Science Building. Ford was awarded an honorary doctorate by the university in 1976.

Many of Ford's works are in San Antonio, where he lived for much of his life. They include the renovation of La Villita, the campus of Saint Mary's Hall, the University of Texas at San Antonio main campus, and the Tower of the Americas. On the campus of Trinity University, also located in San Antonio, are 26 O'Neil Ford-designed buildings, whose distinctive "Bridgeport pink" bricks and innovative lift slab building process are representative of his iconic architectural style. In June 2018, the campus of Trinity University was added to the National Register of Historic Places to highlight the architectural legacy of O'Neil Ford.

While constructing the Saint Mary's Hall campus, O'Neil Ford strove to create a learning environment that merged the outdoors with the classroom. It is impossible to walk to classes at Saint Mary's Hall without being outdoors.

Other significant works include Hedrick House (a residence for the Hedrick family, a prominent family in Lewisville, Texas, now owned by the city), buildings at Skidmore College and several facilities around the world designed for Texas Instruments. Shortly before his death, he completed the design of the building of the Museum of Western Art in Kerrville in the Texas Hill Country.

The San Antonio architectural firm of Ford, Powell and Carson carries on his name.
