= Saint Mary's Hall (San Antonio) =

Private school in San Antonio, Texas, US

Location
- San Antonio, Texas; U.S. 29.528613°N 98.42659°W

Information
- Type: Private; co-educational; non-residential
- Motto: Teach Us Delight in Simple Things
- Religious affiliations: Founded as Episcopalian, now non-denominational
- Established: 1879
- Head of School: Len Miller
- Faculty: 89
- Age range: 3–18
- Enrollment: 790
- Student to teacher ratio: 15:1
- Campus type: Urban
- Colors: Purple and white
- Mascot: Baron
- Website: www.smhall.org

Saint Mary's Hall (SMH) is a private college preparatory school in San Antonio, Texas. Saint Mary's Hall admits students from Montessori (age 3) to Form 12.

== History ==
=== 19th Century ===
Saint Mary's Hall was founded in 1879 as Saint Mary's School for Girls by first Bishop Robert W. B. Elliot. The school has had several names of the course of its history, including Saint Mary's Episcopal School, Saint Mary's School, and Saint Mary's Academy Hall.

The school's origins extend over a decade before its official founding to 1865, when Bishop Alexander Gregg sought to establish an all-girls private church school capable of boarding pupils from across South and West Texas. A sum of US$10,000 was given by the New York philanthropist John David Wolfe, enabling the construction of a school facility on the corner of Navarro and Martin streets, named Wolfe Hall after its benefactor. This facility was deeded to the parish of the associated St. Mark's Church in 1868 on the condition it not be alienated from parish or school use. The school operated in its original incarnation from 1866 to 1873, and was regarded as an attractive educational institution which catered to many notable South Texas families. A San Antonio Express article published August 1871 noted that the student body represented "the prettiest young misses of San Antonio and vicinity" with "a goodly number... of our best families present". However, in 1873, St. Mark's Church chose to terminate the school's private operation and began leasing ground floor facilities as a public school.

Convinced that there was a continuing need for private education of Saint Mary's calibre, Bishop Robert W. B. Elliott began a movement to reestablish the school. In 1879, with the financial support of Miss Catherine L. Wolfe (the daughter of the school's original benefactor), Bishop Elliot was able to reclaim Wolfe Hall from the vestry of St. Mark's and Saint Mary's Hall was officially re-established.

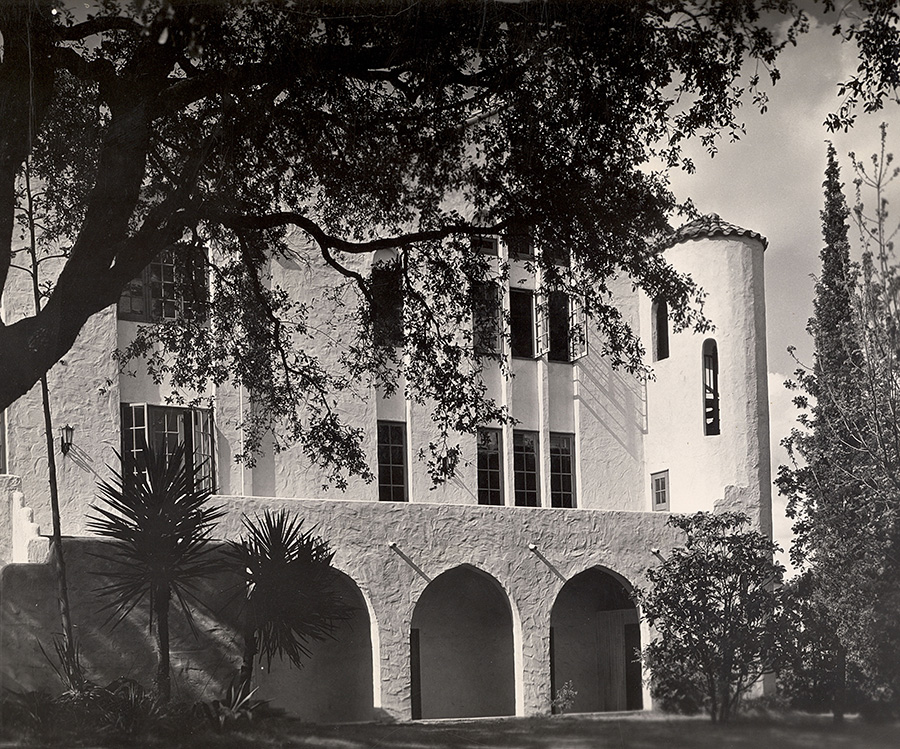
French Place Campus

=== 20th Century ===
By the year 1900, Saint Mary's Hall had considerably expanded both curriculum and student body. A bequest of US$33,364 by Mr. Felix R. Brunot of Pittsburgh enabled the construction of Brunot Hall, which contained a library, six additional bedrooms, and enlarged spaces for academics, music, and art. Additional campus expansions were made in 1907, including the addition of a gymnasium.

In 1916, due to the decline of the facilities and the growth of the downtown area, then-headmaster Bishop William T. Capers decided to move the school to a home in the Laurel Heights neighborhood on the corner of San Pedro and Woodlawn.

In 1925, Saint Mary's Hall was incorporated as a non-profit educational institution with an independent self-perpetuating Board of Trustees. Not long after, the board approved the purchase of a larger and more modern facility in the Laurel Heights neighborhood at 117 East French Place which was purchased from Alfred Ward. This location became the school for the next four decades and before its eventual sale to the San Antonio Academy in 1966. This campus was the home for many years to headmistress Ruth Coit, who established many of the traditions still held today.

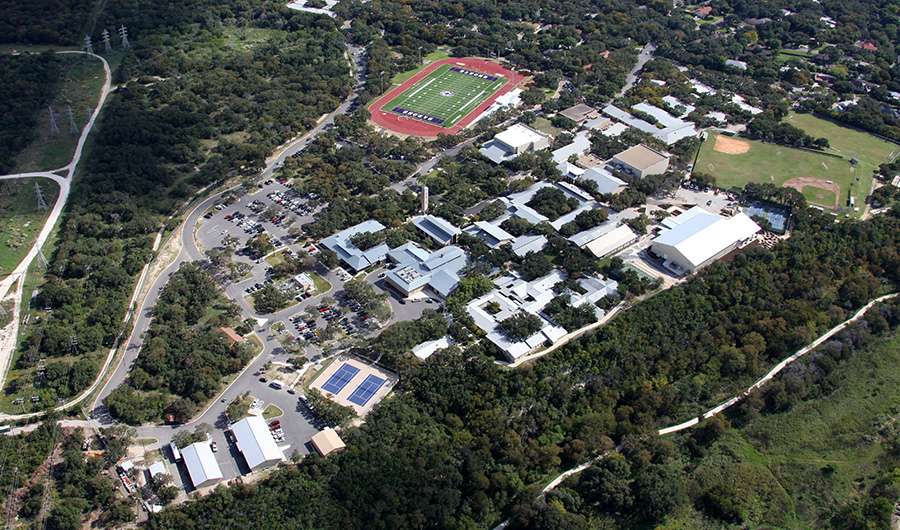
Starcrest Campus

Faced with the need for expansion, the Board of Trustees decided that Saint Mary's Hall should develop a new campus to meet present needs and future demands. In 1964, through funds raised in a $2.38 million capital campaign, the school purchased 60 acres (240,000 m^{2}) at 9401 Starcrest Drive, the school's current location. To design the new campus, the school hired the associated firms of San Antonio architects O'Neil Ford and Bartlett Cocke. The groundbreaking ceremony was held on March 10, 1967, and the campus was occupied on November 22, 1968, by 300 students, including 119 boarding students.

When the firms of O'Neil Ford and Bartlett Cocke were asked to develop the conceptual master plan for the Starcrest Campus, the result was one that drew on Ford's unique Texas Modernist style using natural local materials which would allow his buildings to exist in harmony with the surrounding landscape. Ford designed hundreds of projects throughout Texas from the 1920s to the 1970s, including the distinguishing landmark of the San Antonio skyline, the Tower of the Americas, which he designed for HemisFair '68.

Although Saint Mary's Hall began as an all-girls boarding school, after its move to the Starcrest Campus, the school began to include boys in their educational program through Form 2 for many years. Initially, the board of trustees made the decision to expand the coeducational format through Form 6 in order to accommodate male students from The Montessori School who might want to continue their education at Saint Mary's Hall beyond the Montessori years. In 1979, boys were invited to attend the school through Form 8. And, in 1987, coeducation in the Upper School (Forms 9–12) was fully implemented.

=== 21st Century ===
Similarly, since its inception, Saint Mary's Hall had been a boarding school. As the school grew, school leadership looked to a new direction for long-term sustainability and growth of the school. At the start of the 2000s, school leadership made the decision to become a day school only. After much planning, in 2005, the residence dormitories that were reserved for boarding students were converted into classrooms for the Middle School. Soon after, a monument named Residence Clock, was given to the school in honor of the Saint Mary's Hall boarding students and the Residence Department. The names of three boarding school students are listed on the clock: Frances Dilworth Dilworth ('49), Diane Dilworth Gates ('76), and Thomas Albert Gates Jr. ('02) as are the names of the dormitories: Abercrombie, Cowles, Meyer, and Murchison.

In the fall of 2010, the school embarked on its second capital campaign ... the I AM Saint Mary's Hall campaign, which successfully raised $26 million. Completed in two years (three years sooner than estimated), the campaign addressed improving, expanding, or building specific facilities that would achieve increased energy efficiency, as well as establishing a reserve fund for the maintenance of the targeted facilities. By the end of the 2012 - 2013 school year, the I AM Saint Mary's Hall campaign ended with the following accomplishments: the renovation and expansion of the Peggy Pitman Mays Dining Hall, construction of the Social Science & History Center, construction of the new Alonso Ancira Event Center, redesign of the existing McCombs Family Athletic Complex, the renovation of the Coates-Seeligson Theater/Chapel, and the new addition of the Kim & Rod Lewis Track & Field.

In early 2014, Saint Mary's Hall invited the first undocumented immigrant to be admitted to the State Bar of California to be a speaker at their model United Nations conference. However, the school uninvited the speaker, Sergio C. Garcia, when he refused to certify that he was a citizen by signing a W-9 form. Before uninviting Garcia, Saint Mary's Hall had described him as an “experienced and exciting keynote speaker” and had expressing how unfortunate that he had been waiting for a visa for 19 years.

=== Heads of School ===
Heads of school include:

- Miss Phillippa Stevenson (1879–1889)
- Miss Louise M. Smith (1889–1890)
- Reverend & Mrs. J. G. Mullholland, LL.D. (1890–1894)
- The Reverend Wallace Carnahan (1894–1906)
- The Reverend Arthur W. Burroughs (1906–1914)
- Miss Elizabeth Andrews (1914–1915)
- The Right Reverend William T. Capers (1915–1916)
- Miss Laura Lee Dorsey (1916–1923)
- Miss Virginia M. Dorsey (1923–1924)
- Miss Ruth Coit (1924–1937)
- Miss Estelle M. Bonnell (1937–1940)
- Miss Katherine Lee (1940–1946)
- Miss Gretchen E. Tonks (1946–1952)
- Miss Beatrice McDermott (1952–1961)
- Mr. Henry B. Pennell (1961–1966)
- Mr. William R. Garrison (1966–1972)
- Mr. Sherwood W. Inkley (1972–1976)
- Mr. Cornelius H. Bull (1976–1978)
- Mrs. Joan M. Mellard (1979-)
- Mr. John Thomas
- Mr. Bob Windham
- Mr. Jonathan Eades
- Mr. Len Miller (-Present)
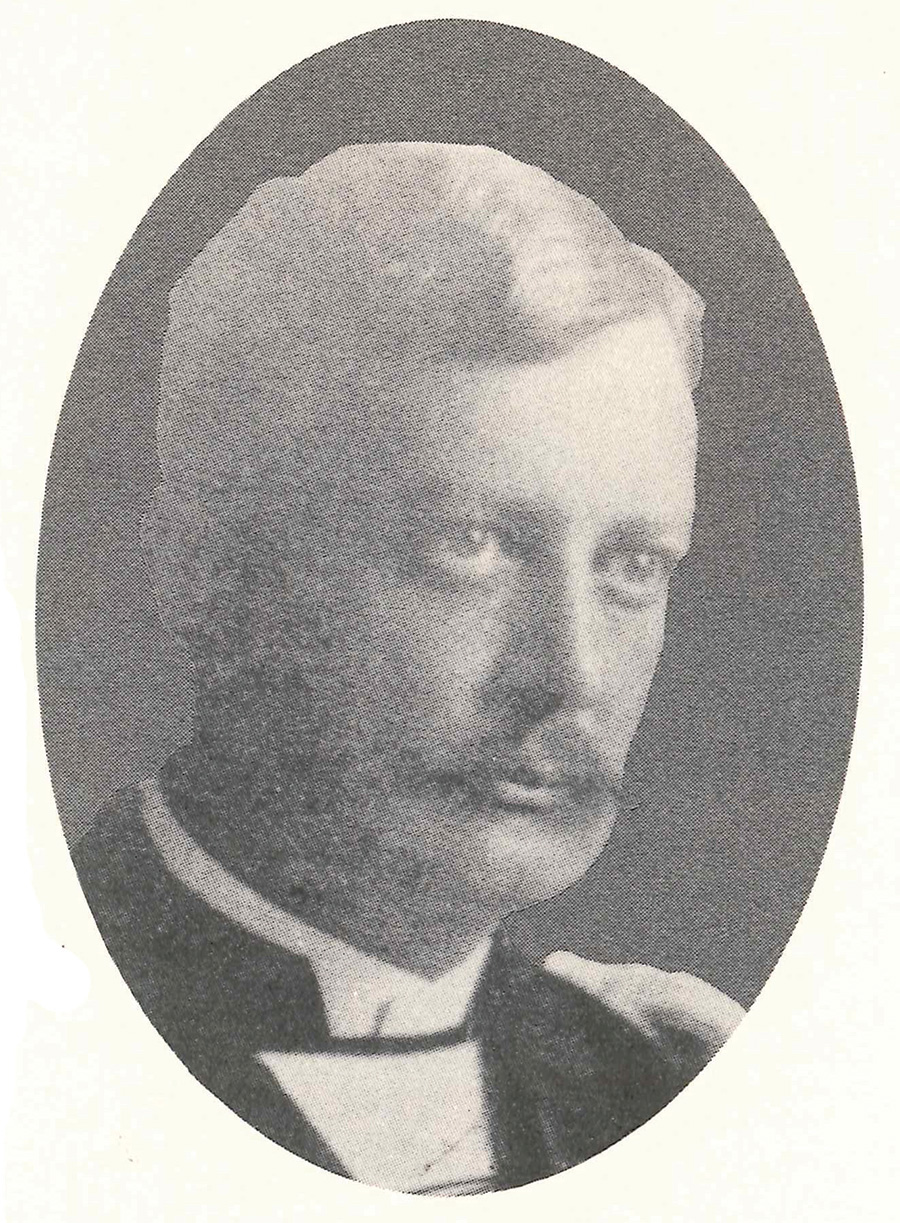
Bishop Elliott

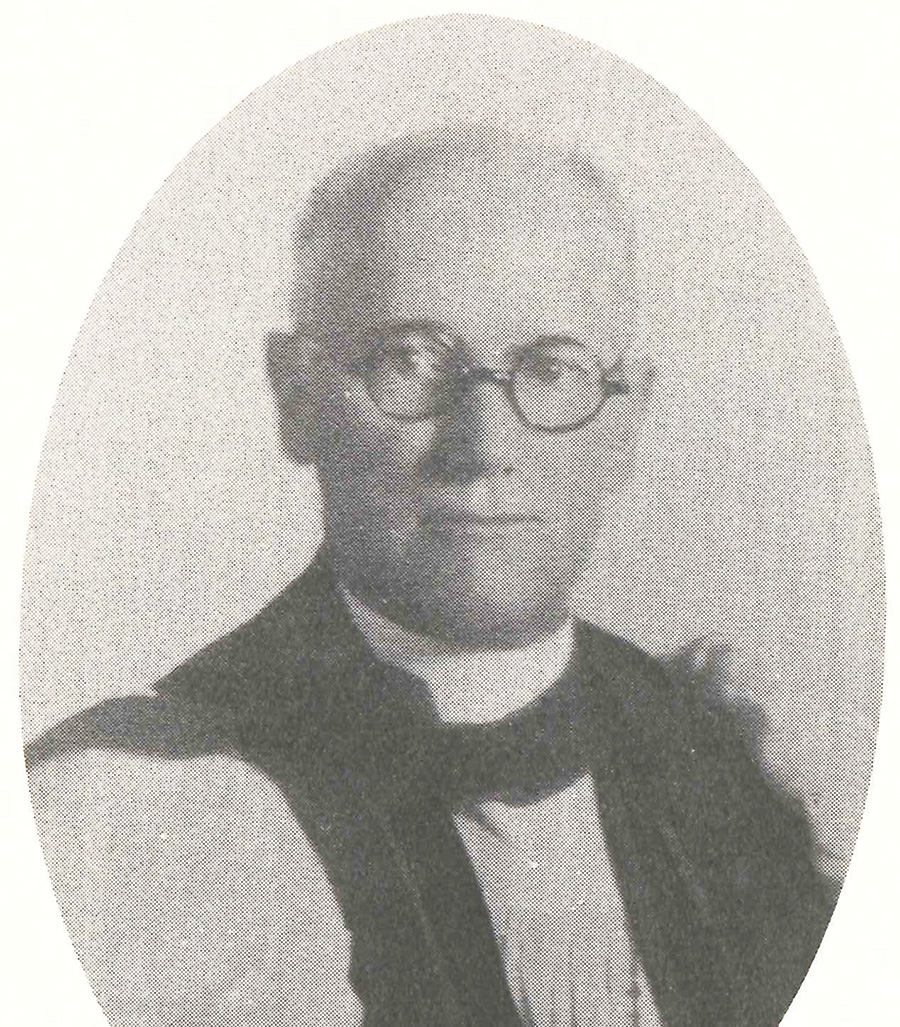
Bishop Capers

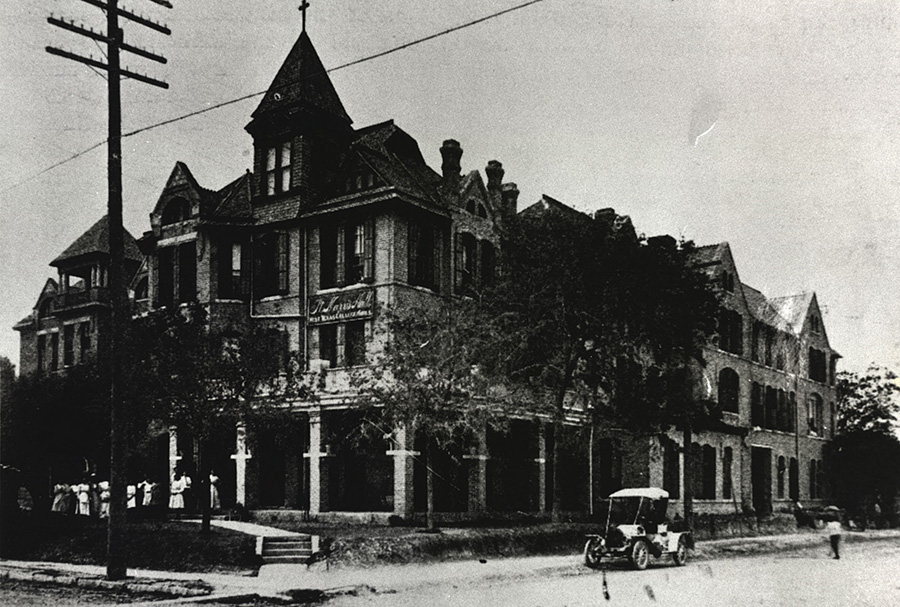
Wolfe Campus

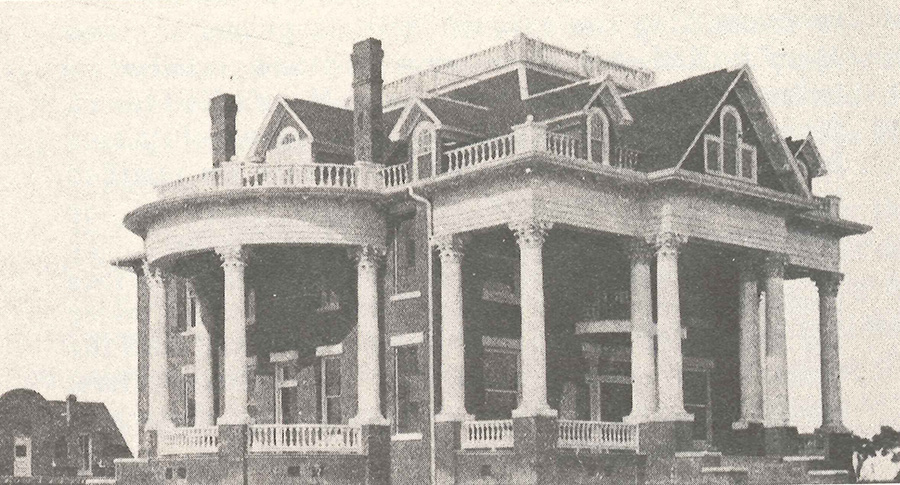
Woodlawn Campus

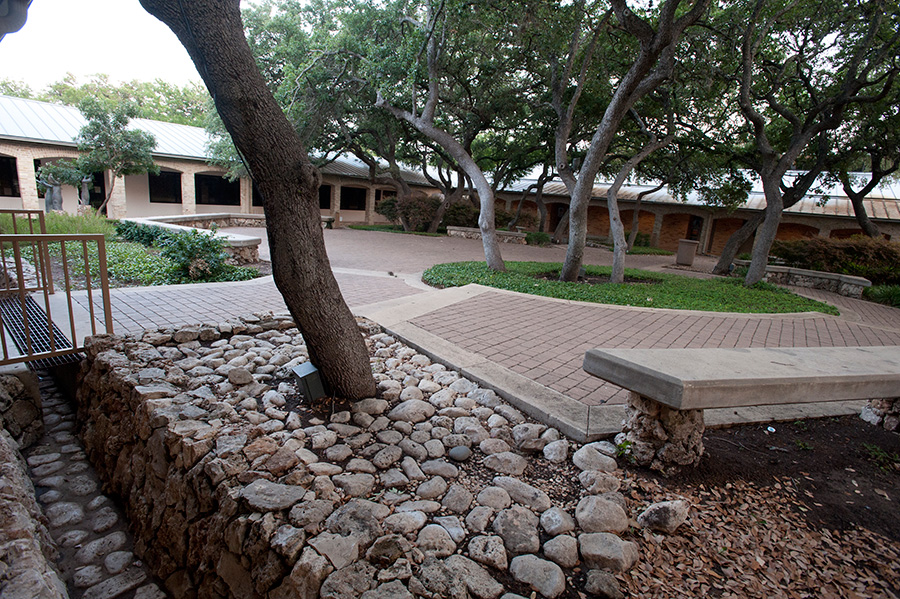
Starcrest campus Upper School courtyard

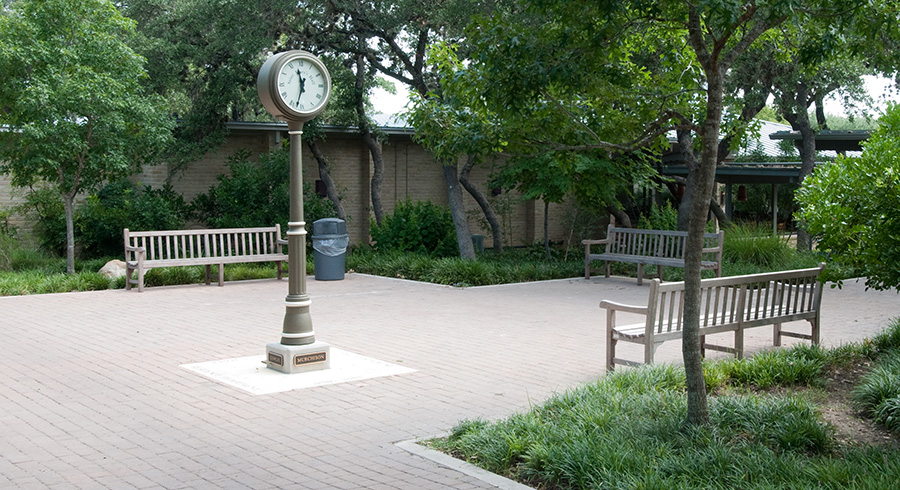
Residence Clock

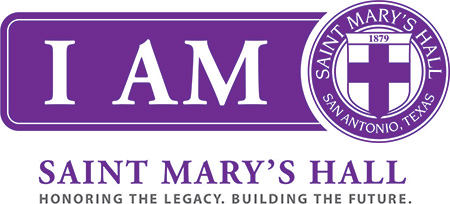
I AM Saint Mary's Hall capital campaign logo

== Traditions ==
=== Alma Mater ===
The Saint Mary's Hall alma mater was written by Caroline S. Cummins in 1928, and the music was composed by Mabel C. Osborne. The title was simple, “Alma Mater.” Later that year, the song was copyrighted by Headmistress Ruth Coit. Nowadays, students don't sing the alma mater as often, but the song is technically still in use.

=== Blue Tie Ceremony ===
The first Blue Tie Ceremony was held on September 10, 1940, when the first blue ties were awarded to the Class of 1941. This ceremony is a rite of passage for seniors and occurs during the first week of the new school year. It is during this ceremony that members of the senior class are presented with their class rings and blue ties (to be worn with their uniforms). Today, this special event includes a convocation event with the entire school in attendance; a parade where seniors celebrate their transition from juniors to seniors; and the Blue Tie Ceremony (where the ties are awarded to seniors).

=== Capers & Elliott ===
In the fall of 1925, Headmistress Ruth Coit organized an athletic association in the Upper School, and two intramural teams were formed: Elliott and Capers, named in honor of two of the school's most influential leaders ... Bishop Elliott and Bishop Capers. Almost a hundred years later, students and faculty continue to participate in the sorting ceremony, where they are assigned to one of the two teams. The sorting ceremony typically happens during the first week of school, and students remain on their team throughout their time in the Upper School. Today's Capers and Elliott team captains are still elected by the student body, and the teams compete throughout the year, including at the annual Bishops’ Day.

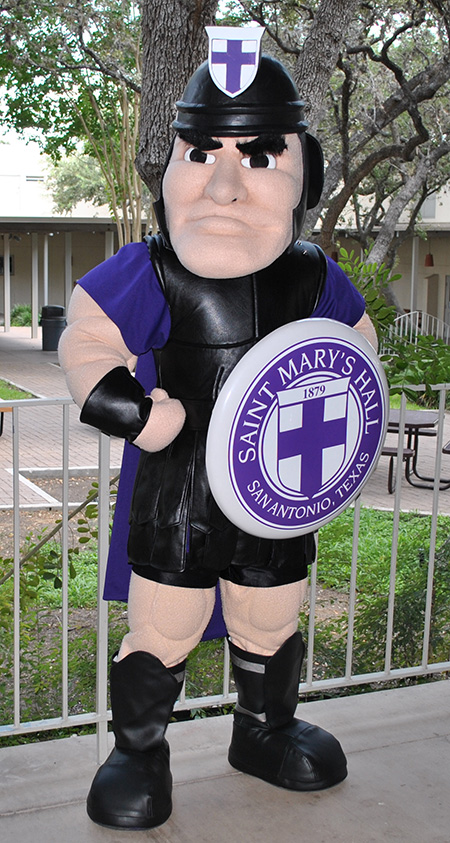
The Baron

=== Chapel ===
In 1879, Saint Mary's Hall was founded as an Episcopalian school. Today, the school maintains many Christian-based traditions but doesn't seek to promote or favor one faith over another. Each division gathers for a time of worship and reflection each Monday in order to be inspired through music, scripture readings, and stories of faith & service. Guest speakers present frequently at the Upper & Middle School chapels on a variety of topics.

=== La Reata ===
In 1928, the first edition of the Saint Mary's Hall yearbook, La Reata, was published with a foreword written by Headmistress Ruth Coit. Among other things, this first yearbook reported on the newly formed “Stir Up Club,” which had been formed to promote equestrian riding at Saint Mary's Hall and had succeeded in “winning first prize in the Battle of Flowers with their Cavalcade.”

=== School Mascot ===
Saint Mary's Hall was “mascot-less” from 1879 until 1970. During the 1970–1971 school year, references indicate that the mascot was a Bobcat. Over the years, other mascots have come and gone including Snoopy from the Peanuts cartoon.

In 2009, a committee of students from the Upper and Middle Schools was formed to determine and define who the SMH Baron really was and what he embodied to today's students. Today's Baron is a warrior that is symbolic of "inner toughness, grit, and determination."

=== School Motto ===
The Saint Mary's Hall motto, “Teach us delight in simple things” first appeared on the French Place campus where it was set in bronzed lettering in the stone steps of the school building. In 1968, the bronze lettering was moved to the Starcrest Campus (at the front entrance to the Administration Building) from the French Place campus.

=== School Ties ===
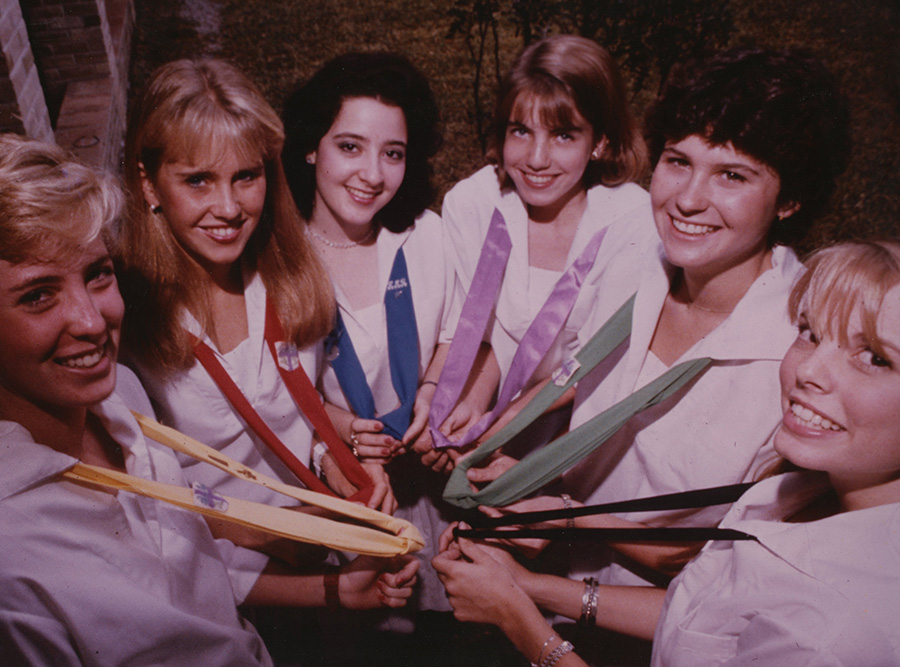
Saint Mary's Hall students wear “ties” to signify their leadership roles in different organizations around the school.

Saint Mary's Hall students wear “ties” to signify their leadership roles in different organizations around the school.

Upper School

- Blue Tie – Seniors
- Red Tie – Student Council
- Yellow Tie – Sports Council
- Green Tie – Community Service Council
- White Tie – Fine Arts Council
- Maroon Tie – Honor Council

Middle School

- Teal Tie – Community Service Council
- Orange Tie – Bailey Intramural Team
- Green Tie – Bennett Intramural Team
- Maroon Tie – Student Senate

=== Uniforms ===
Saint Mary's Hall students wear uniforms to school. This tradition can be traced back to when the school began. Students wear formal dress uniforms to school every Monday and for special occasions such as Blue Tie Ceremony. The girls’ dress uniform consists of a white skirt, white middy blouse, and tie. The boys wear khaki slacks, a white dress shirt, black blazer, and tie. During the week the girls wear a black pleated skirt, white middy blouse, and tie (females may have the choice of wearing the males white polo as of August 2021), while boys wear khaki slacks and a white polo shirt.

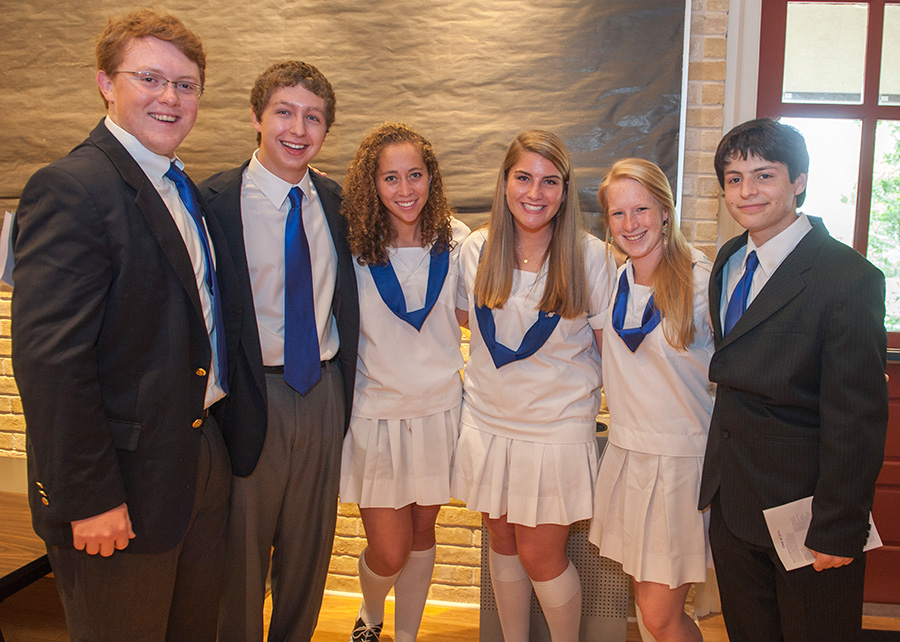
SMH students wear blue ties during their senior class year.

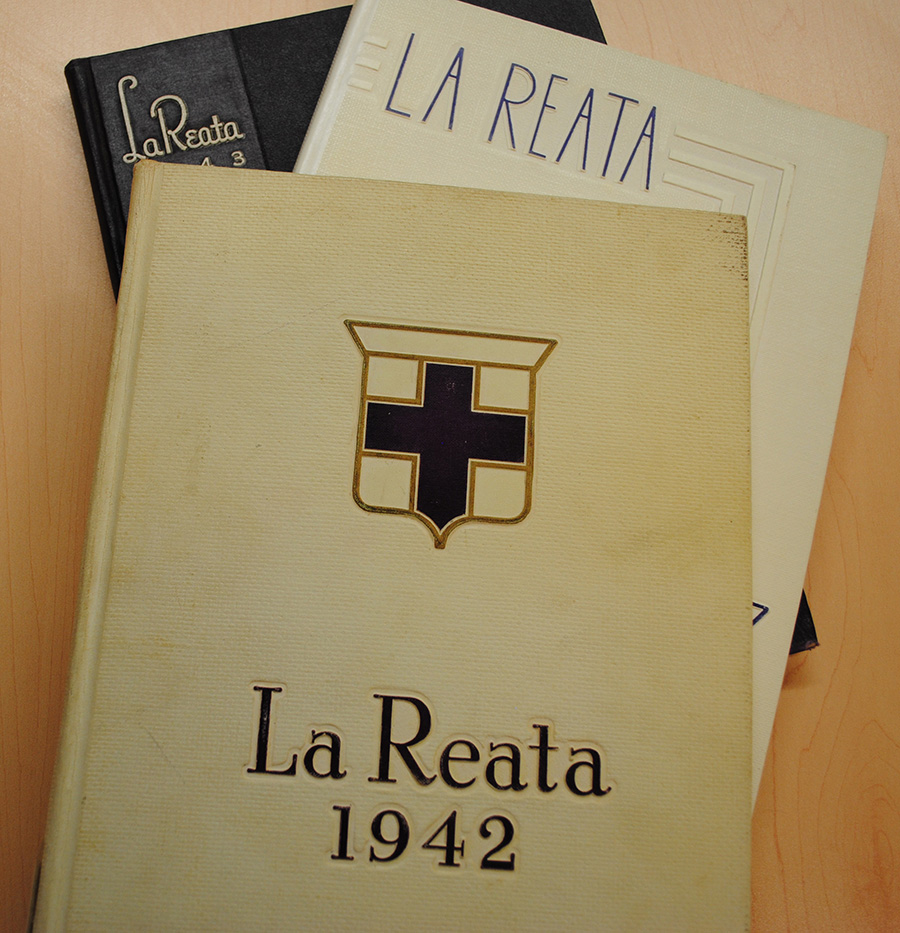
La Reata, the SMH yearbook

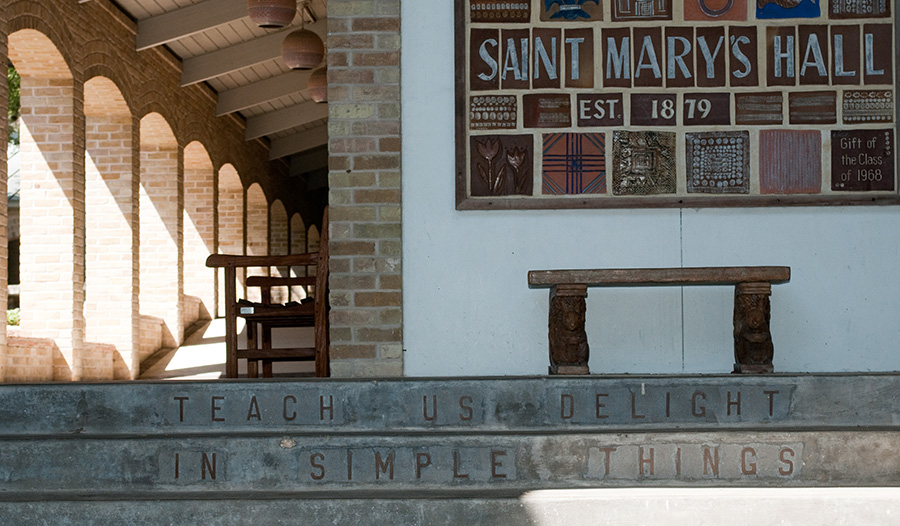
Front steps to SMH

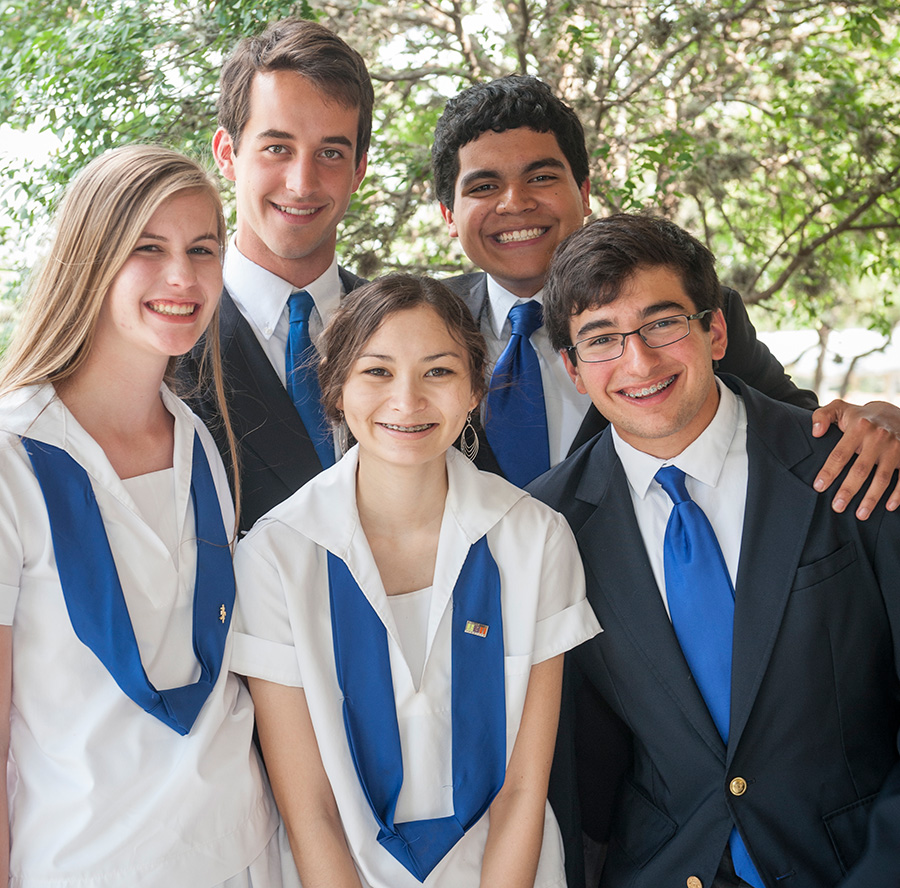
SMH students in uniform

== Curriculum ==
Class of 2025
National Merit Commended Scholars	5
National Merit Finalists	2
Presidential Volunteer Service Award Recipients	37
4-Year Averages/Information: 2018-2023
Average Graduating Class Size	86
Matriculating Out of State	52%
National Merit Finalists	53
Average SAT Score	1,315

The academic curriculum at Saint Mary's Hall is a mixture of English, Fine Arts, Mathematics, Science, Social Studies, and World Languages. The faculty attends (and is encouraged to seek out) professional enrichment opportunities in their subject areas to ensure students are learning from the most up-to-date curriculum and in the newest ways. Many faculty members also lead these professional enrichment programs for their peers at conferences around the state of the Texas and the country.

In the Upper School, SMH offers 20 Advanced Placement (AP) courses, and the student body takes 568 AP exams annually, on average. Averages based on 2012-2016 graduation statistics.

=== Fine Arts ===
The Tobin Fine Arts School at Saint Mary's Hall offers five programs: Dance, Drama/Speech & Debate, Media Arts, Music, and Visual Arts. Students and faculty, who are artists themselves, have access to thousands of square feet of dedicated art space (including multiple performance areas, media labs, a photography center, an art studio with kilns, a music hall, and rooms for private practice and instruction).

=== Athletics ===
Students can choose to participate in any of the 14 men's and women's sports offered throughout the year. The SMH Athletic department staff is made up of more than 60 coaches, a certified athletic trainer, and a strength and conditioning coach.

Lower School students compete in community leagues playing soccer and basketball. Middle School students compete in the Independent School Athletic League with schools from San Antonio and the surrounding area. Upper School students compete in the Texas Association of Private and Parochial Schools (TAPPS).

Over the years, more than 50 students have been named All-Area Private School Athletes by the San Antonio Express-News, and more than 25 students have earned national awards from governing bodies. Additionally, many students choose to continue to participate competitively in athletics during college.

== Distinctive Programs ==
Saint Mary's Hall offers students experiences and programs. Students are exposed to world religions in Chapel, meet one-on-one with their college counselor, or help plan the annual Issues Day debate. A list of SMH's distinctive programs is below:

- Chapel
- College Counseling
- Study Abroad Opportunities
- Student Enrichment
- Investing in Our Faculty
- Responsible Decision Making
- Community Events
- Campus Technology
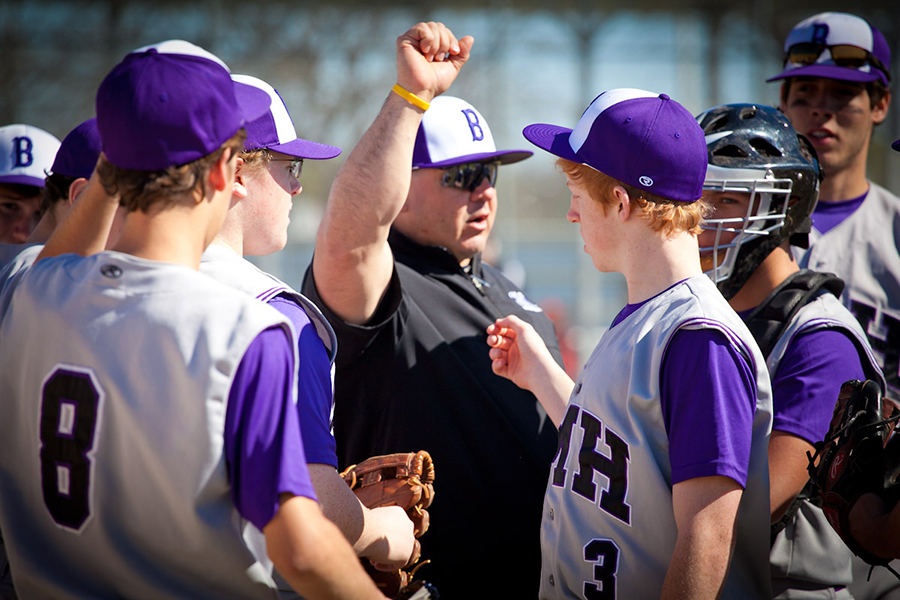
The SMH varsity baseball team takes a moment to huddle with their head coach during an inning break.

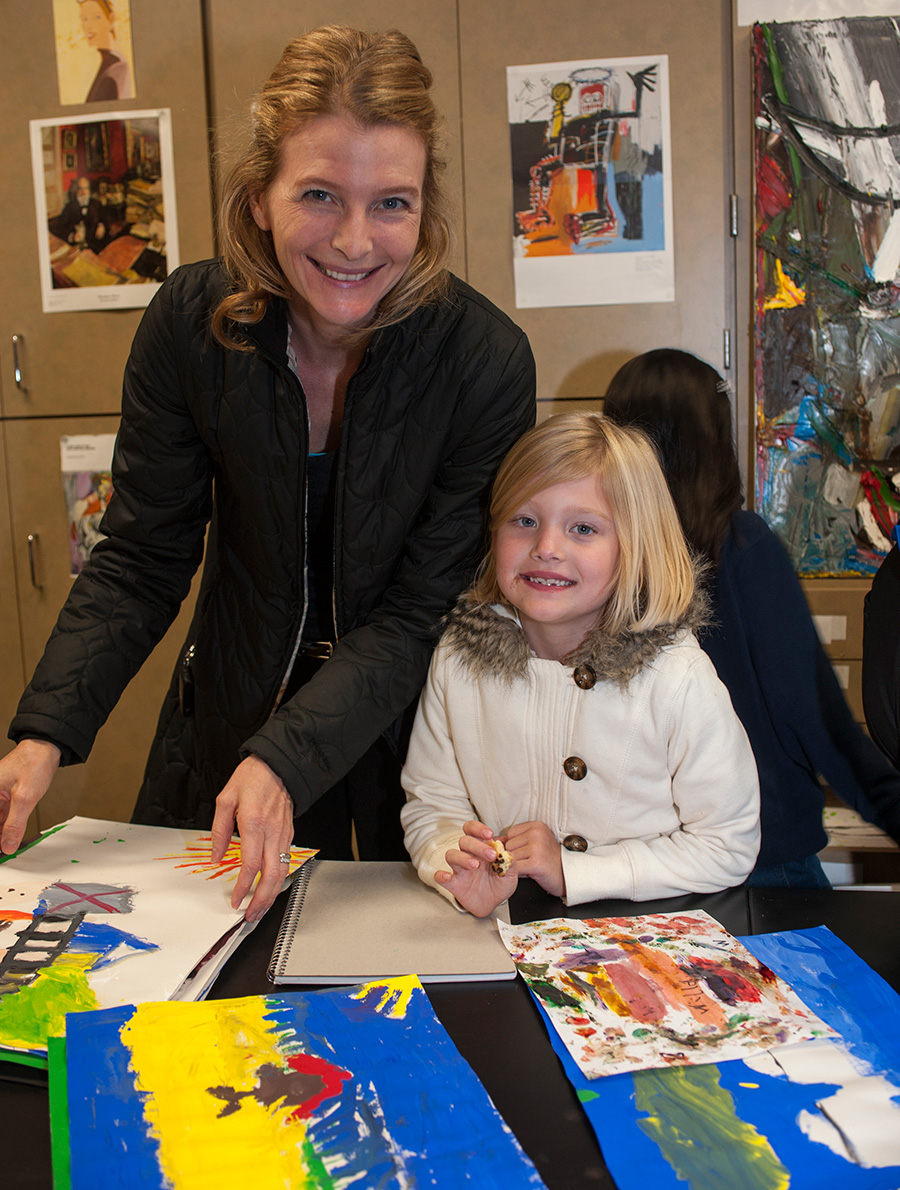
Lower School students and parents work on art projects at the Tobin Fine Arts School at Saint Mary's Hall.

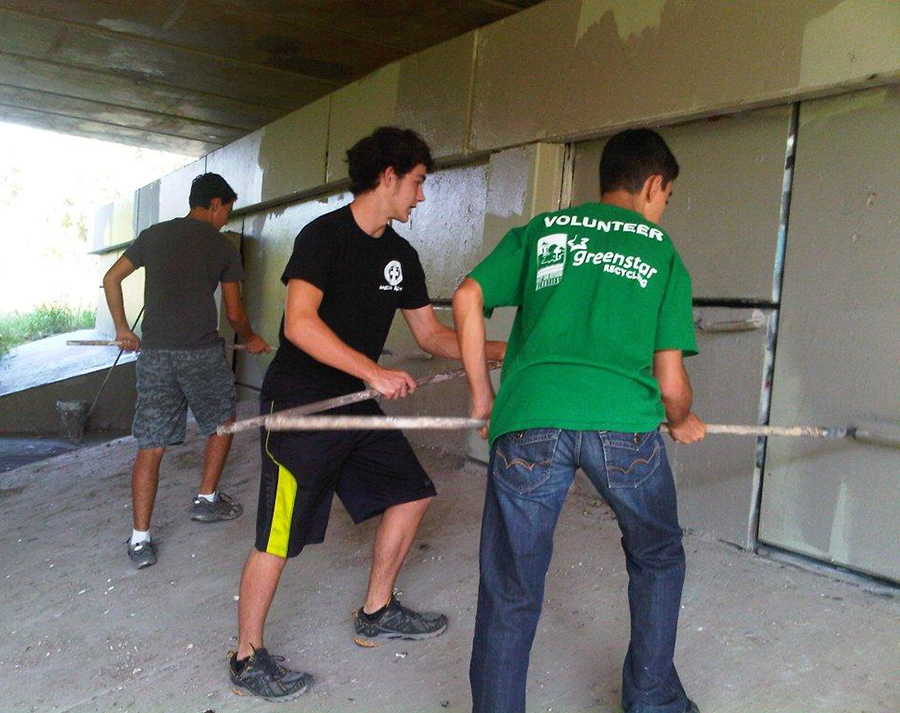
Students at Saint Mary's Hall take part in community service projects in and around San Antonio.

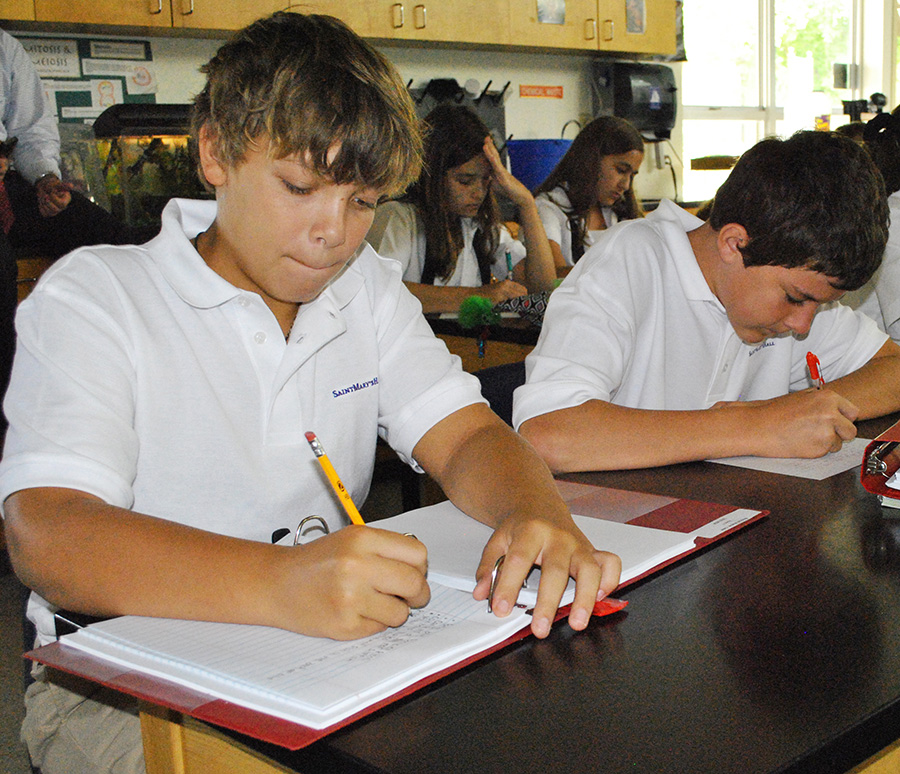
Middle School Life Science students jot down notes in their lab notebooks during a lecture.

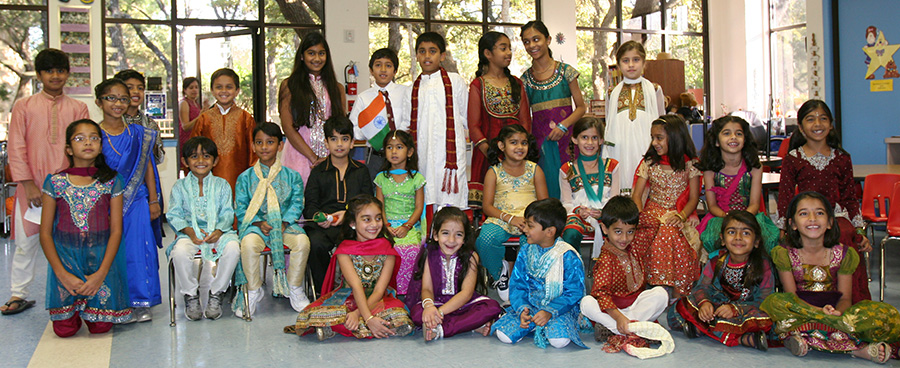
Dressed in traditional Hindu clothing, Lower School students take the opportunity to teach their classmates about Diwali (the Festival of Lights) during Morning Moments.

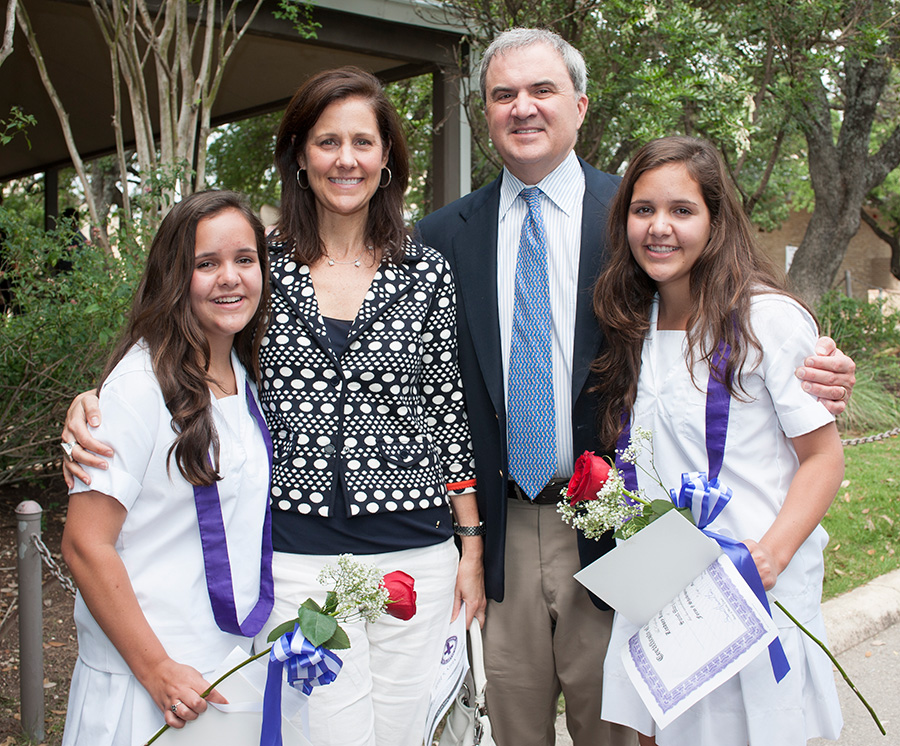
A Saint Mary's Hall family celebrates together after the Form 8 graduation ceremony.

== Accreditation ==
Saint Mary's Hall is accredited by the Independent Schools Association of the Southwest (ISAS), a member of the NAIS Commission on Accreditation. Saint Mary's Hall is also a member of the following national and regional organizations:

- American Montessori Society
- College Board
- Educational Records Bureau (ERB)
- National Association for College Admission Counseling (NACAC)
- National Association of Independent Schools (NAIS)
- Independent Schools Association of the Southwest (ISAS)
- Southwest Preparatory Conference (SPC)
- Secondary School Admission Test Board (SSATB)
