= Carrie Scott =

American art writer

- Born: Oxford, England
- Other name: Carrie Scott Lazarus
- Education: Dickinson College; University of Washington
- Occupations: Curator; television presenter; art writer

Carrie E. A. Scott (born 1979) is an American/English curator, gallery director, TV presenter and art writer living in London. She is also known as Carrie Scott Lazarus.

== Early life ==
Scott was born in Oxford, England and moved to Old Greenwich, Connecticut. She went to Greenwich High School, then attended Dickinson College in Carlisle, Pennsylvania, graduating class of 2001. She did a Master's in Art History at the University of Washington in Seattle, WA.

== Career ==
Scott was Director of Nicole Klagbsrun Gallery, New York, where she worked with artists such as Beth Campbell, Matthew Day Jackson, Rashid Johnson, Mika Rottenberg, Adam McEwen, and Storm Tharp. Prior to that, Scott was curator of the Hedreen Gallery at Seattle University's Lee Center for the Arts, Director of the James Harris Gallery.

In 2008 Scott established her own company that is an art consultancy, gallery and curatorial endeavour. She produces and curates exhibitions that exist within and beyond the walls of the traditional gallery space

From January 2010 until January 2020 she collaborated with Nick Knight's SHOWstudio as the Director of the SHOWstudio Shop.

In 2017, Scott appeared as a presenter on The Art Show, a series on Sky Arts. She is a Nominator for the Prix Pictet award. In 2018, she curated the largest independent photography exhibition at the Store x 180 Strand in London. It featured some 470 photographs, 340 of which were from John Pawson's Spectrum.

In 2020, she and David Hill co-curated Tête-à-Têtes: West African Portraiture from Independence into the 21st Century.

In addition to her curating art exhibitions, Scott is also an arts writer.

In 2024, Scott founded Seen, an art consultancy with a stated goal of bringing transparency to the art world. With real-time communication and short-form video at its core, the consultancy works to make art more accessible for artists and collectors. Features have included Rashid Johnson, Lubaina Himid, and Joel Mesler among others.
