= Selwyn School =

School in Argyle, Texas, United States

The Selwyn School is a coeducational day school located in Argyle, Texas. Founded in 1957, the school educates grades Pre-kindergarten through 12. The school has an enrollment of over 100, primarily from Denton, but also from surrounding north Texas towns.

== History ==
In 1955, Denton Civic Boys Choir School was founded. But after two years, a group of prominent Denton residents led by John Ross of Moore Business Forms put together a non-profit group to take over the school. With a borrowed $100, the school, renamed Denton Preparatory School in 1957, began classes in a building leased from Texas Woman's University. Thirty-three students attended kindergarten through 9th grade, and it had five teachers. Leading that faculty was another Ross recruit: John D. Doncaster, a former English instructor at Southern Methodist University. Two years later, Doncaster led the school to a new location to accommodate the 85 students and the fledgling boarding program.

In 1961, Rayzor, a Houston developer and prominent landowner in Denton, donated 100 acres (0.40 km^{2}) of land to the school on University Drive (U.S. Route 380) west of town. In the fall of that year, the school was completed and ready for occupancy. To honor Rayzor, it was named after his daughter, Jeanne Selwyn Rayzor (1926–1976). Over time, the school became a boarding and day school. It gained accreditation by the Texas Education Agency and the Independent Schools Association of the Southwest, a regional association of the National Association of Independent Schools. It also gradually added grades, eventually becoming a K–12 institution.

In the 1970s to the 1980s, Doncaster made trips to the Middle East to encourage parents there to send their children to boarding school in Denton. At the time, Saudi Aramco (the Arabian American Oil Company) would pay to send employees' children overseas to school. Grades were added to accommodate demand, and, eventually, in 2003, the reopening of the upper school began with the 9th grade and adding grades through the 12th.

== Campus move ==
On January 26, 2012, a fire destroyed the main building of the school, extensively damaging classrooms, offices, and destroying records. A fire marshal later determined it was arson.

A ceremony was held for a new building in May 2015, but in March 2016, the process was halted when fundraising goals were not met. In May 2016, the school administration considered moving to a more central location when an anonymous donor made an offer.

On March 20, 2017, it moved to a new campus on Copper Canyon Road in Argyle, Texas. A new preschool building opened its doors in August 2019, and the all-school "Smith Family Commons" was completed in September 2019.

== Curriculum ==
Selwyn has a Perspectives program, an annual trip that is integrated into the curriculum. Younger students generally stay in-state, while middle school and upper school students venture further. Since moving to the current Argyle campus, Outdoor Education is integral to the school.
