= Matthew Day Jackson =

American artist (born 1974)

- Born: 1974 (age 51–52)
- Education: University of Washington (BFA); Rutgers University (MFA)
- Occupation: Artist

Matthew Day Jackson (born 1974) is an American artist whose multifaceted practice encompasses sculpture, painting, collage, photography, drawing, video, performance and installation. Since graduating with an MFA from Rutgers University in 2001, following his BFA from the University of Washington in Seattle, he has had numerous solo exhibitions. His work has been shown at MAMbo Museo d'Arte Moderna in Bologna, Italy; Boulder Museum of Contemporary Art in Boulder, Colorado; the Museum of Fine Arts in Boston, MA; the Portland Museum of Art Biennial in Portland, Maine; and the Whitney Biennial Day for Night in New York.

== Work ==
Jackson's works utilize a familiar iconography - images such as the geodesic structures of Buckminster Fuller, mankind's first steps on the moon, and the covers of Life magazine from the 1960s and 1970s - and references from art history. Materials he employs have included scorched wood, molten lead, mother-of-pearl, precious metals, formica, and found objects such as worn T-shirts, prosthetic limbs, axe handles and posters.

The critic Jeffrey Kastner has noted that his works locate ‘startling beauty in their counterintuitive material juxtapositions.’ However, for Jackson beauty is frequently partnered by desolation. His work explores a concept that he terms ‘the Horriful’, the belief that everything one does has the potential to bring both beauty and horror. In one such work, titled Little Bouquet in Clay Jar (2018), the artist incorporates an aerial view of the Trinity test site, explaining that 'the job of the apocalypse or the reckoning is the job of a god or deity, but in the 20th century, it became a human possibility.'

Matthew Day Jackson is represented by Hauser & Wirth and Grimm Gallery in Amsterdam.

== Selected solo exhibitions ==
=== 2013 ===
- "Something Ancient, Something New, Something Stolen, Something Blue", Hauser & Wirth 18th Street, New York NY
- "Total Accomplishment", ZKM Museum of Contemporary Art, Karlsruhe, Germany

=== 2012 ===
- "In Search Of..." Gemeentemuseum, The Hague, Netherlands

=== 2011 ===
- "Heel gezellig," Grimm Gallery, Amsterdam, the Netherlands
- "Everything Leads to Another," Hauser & Wirth, London, England
- "In Search Of..." MAMbo, Bologna, Italy
- "In Search Of..." Kunstmuseum Luzern, Lucerne, Switzerland

=== 2009 ===
- "Dynamic Maximum Tension," Grimm Gallery, Amsterdam
- "The Immeasurable Distance," MIT List Visual Art Center, Cambridge MA

=== 2007 ===
- "Paradise Now! (The Salvage) Workspace Matthew Day Jackson," The Blanton Museum of Art, Austin TX

=== 2006 ===
- "Paradise Now!" Portland Institute of Contemporary Art, Portland OR

=== 2004 ===
- "By No Means Necessary," The Locker Plant, Chinati Foundation, Marfa TX

== Selected group exhibitions ==
=== 2012 ===
- "Hauser & Wirth, “Science on the back end": Artists selected by Matthew Day Jackson, New York NY
- "Saatchi Gallery, ‘Out of focus: Photography", London, England
- "Public Art Fund, ‘Common Ground", New York NY

=== 2011 ===
- "Autobody: Featuring North of South West of East," Ballroom Marfa, Marfa TX
- "Singular Visions," Whitney Museum of American Art, New York NY
- "The World Belongs to You," Palazzo Grassi, Francois Pinault Foundation, Venice, Italy
- "The Shape We're In," Zabludowicz Collection, London, England
- "American Exuberance," Rubell Family Collection/Contemporary Arts Foundation, Miami FL

=== 2010 ===
- "New Paintings," Grimm Gallery, The Netherlands
- "Born in Dystopia," Rosenblum Collection, Paris, France

=== 2009 ===
- "Hi, Low and in Between," Grimm Gallery, Amsterdam, the Netherlands
- "The World is Yours," Louisiana Museum of Contemporary Art, Humlebaek, Denmark
- "Deceitful Moon," Hayward Gallery Project Space, London, England
- "Mapping the Studio: Artists from the Francois Pinault Collection," Venice, Italy

=== 2008 ===
- "Heartland," Van Abbemuseum, Eindoven, the Netherlands

=== 2006 ===
- "USA Today," Royal Academy of Art, London, England
- "Uncertain States of America - American Art in the Third Millenium" Serpentine Gallery, London (Travelling Exhibition)

=== 2005 ===
- "The Greater New York," PS1 Contemporary Art Center, New York NY

=== 2003 ===
- "Biennial," Portland Museum of Art, Portland OR
