= List of tornadoes in the outbreak and floods of April 28 – May 1, 2017 =

From April 28 to May 1, 2017, a significant tornado outbreak took place across the southern portions of the United States, spawning 77 tornadoes and causing significant flash flooding as a result.

== Confirmed tornadoes ==
=== April 28 event ===
List of confirmed tornadoes – Friday, April 28, 2017 (Note: All dates are based on the local time zone where the tornado touched down; however, all times are in Coordinated Universal Time for consistency.)
| EF# | Location | County / Parish | State | Start Coord. | Time (UTC) | Path length | Max width |
|---|---|---|---|---|---|---|---|
| EF2 | W of Cameron | Le Flore | OK | 35.1017°N 94.5783°W | 03:36–03:51 | 8.1 mi (13.0 km) | 750 yd (690 m) |
| EF2 | Mobile homes and outbuildings were destroyed, and frame homes were damaged to a lesser degree. Two metal shipping containers were thrown 50 yards, while a school bus, several cars, tractors, and a dump truck were rolled as well. A bulldozer was dragged, and power poles were snapped. Numerous trees were snapped and uprooted as well. | | | | | | |
| EF1 | Goshen | Oldham | KY | 38.397°N 85.596°W | 03:53–03:56 | 1.29 mi (2.08 km) | 250 yd (230 m) |
| EF1 | Two buildings, including the main worship center, were damaged at a large church facility in town. Numerous trees were snapped or uprooted; some trees damaged the roofs and gutters of houses. Power lines and power poles were downed. Several residences sustained significant roof damage, and barns were damaged as well. | | | | | | |

=== April 29 event ===
List of confirmed tornadoes – Saturday, April 29, 2017
| EF# | Location | County / Parish | State | Start Coord. | Time (UTC) | Path length | Max width |
|---|---|---|---|---|---|---|---|
| EF1 | WNW of Natchitoches | Natchitoches | LA | 31.7571°N 93.1455°W | 19:24–19:28 | 1.96 mi (3.15 km) | 290 yd (270 m) |
| EF1 | One home sustained roof damage while a second had several windows blown out and lost some of its siding. Numerous trees were snapped or uprooted, one of which landed on a workshop. Another falling tree crushed a house, and a dock was destroyed at Sibley Lake. | | | | | | |
| EF1 | WNW of Bellefonte | Boone | AR | 36.2087°N 93.0769°W | 20:16–20:18 | 1.89 mi (3.04 km) | 100 yd (91 m) |
| EF1 | Several trees were snapped or uprooted, some of which landed on homes. Homes sustained roof, window, and siding damage. Wooden projectiles were speared into tree branches and the ground. A metal canoe was thrown and impaled on a metal storage rack. One large home had an exterior wall bowed inward, injuring one occupant when a chandelier fell on her. | | | | | | |
| EF0 | ENE of Kampville | St. Charles | MO | 38.8507°N 90.5310°W | 20:31–20:35 | 3.85 mi (6.20 km) | 100 yd (91 m) |
| EF0 | Several homes sustained minor roof damage. Outbuildings and sheds were destroyed, trees were snapped and uprooted, and at least a half dozen boats and campers were tossed. | | | | | | |
| EF1 | NNW of Brighton | Jersey, Macoupin | IL | 39.0711°N 90.1723°W | 21:02–21:05 | 2.36 mi (3.80 km) | 50 yd (46 m) |
| EF1 | Numerous trees were snapped, twisted, and uprooted. A detached garage was completely destroyed, and a nearby home had roof damage and windows blown out. | | | | | | |
| EF0 | SW of Grand Saline | Van Zandt | TX | 32.61°N 95.75°W | 21:14–21:17 | 1.46 mi (2.35 km) | 100 yd (91 m) |
| EF0 | A brief tornado caused damage to numerous trees along its path. This tornado path was adjusted significantly in July 2025 to match radar data and the damage path on high-resolution satellite imagery. | | | | | | |
| EF1 | E of Sallisaw | Sequoyah | OK | 35.4394°N 94.7782°W | 21:17–21:30 | 7.3 mi (11.7 km) | 600 yd (550 m) |
| EF1 | Outbuildings were destroyed, power poles were snapped, and trees were uprooted. | | | | | | |
| EF0 | NE of Alexander | Morgan | IL | 39.7459°N 90.0°W | 21:20–21:21 | 0.68 mi (1.09 km) | 10 yd (9.1 m) |
| EF0 | A tornado briefly touched down in an open field. No damage occurred. | | | | | | |
| EF0 | NE of Big Rock to S of Tundra | Van Zandt | TX | 32.39°N 95.91°W | 21:46–21:49 | 2.03 mi (3.27 km) | 75 yd (69 m) |
| EF0 | See article on this tornado | | | | | | |
| EF1 | N of Natural Dam | Crawford | AR | 35.6709°N 94.4602°W | 21:57–22:05 | 5.5 mi (8.9 km) | 300 yd (270 m) |
| EF1 | A mobile home was destroyed, a house was damaged, power poles were downed, and trees were uprooted. | | | | | | |
| EF0 | E of Canton | Van Zandt | TX | 32.55°N 95.83°W | 22:08–22:11 | 1.51 mi (2.43 km) | 75 yd (69 m) |
| EF0 | See article on this tornado | | | | | | |
| EF4 | N of Log Cabin to W of Canton | Henderson, Van Zandt | TX | 32.26°N 96.02°W | 22:23–23:07 | 23.8 mi (38.3 km) | 1,760 yd (1,610 m) |
| EF4 | 2 deaths – See article on this tornado – Twenty-five people were injured. | | | | | | |
| EF2 | NE of Log Cabin to SSE of Big Rock | Henderson | TX | 32.26°N 95.98°W | 22:47–22:57 | 6.5 mi (10.5 km) | 100 yd (91 m) |
| EF2 | See article on this tornado – "Multiple" people were injured. | | | | | | |
| EF3 | SE of Big Rock to Western Fruitvale to E of Dougherty | Van Zandt, Rains | TX | 32.35°N 95.92°W | 23:00–00:25 | 44.84 mi (72.16 km) | 1,760 yd (1,610 m) |
| EF3 | 2 deaths – See article on this tornado – Twenty-four people were injured. | | | | | | |
| EF0 | Western Canton | Van Zandt | TX | 32.54°N 95.88°W | 23:02–23:04 | 0.98 mi (1.58 km) | 50 yd (46 m) |
| EF0 | See article on this tornado | | | | | | |
| EF0 | W of Miller Grove | Hopkins | TX | 32.9906°N 95.836°W | 23:32–23:50 | 8.57 mi (13.79 km) | 100 yd (91 m) |
| EF0 | See article on this tornado | | | | | | |
| EF0 | N of Pauline to SSW of Phalba | Van Zandt | TX | 32.36°N 96.05°W | 00:13–00:21 | 3.04 mi (4.89 km) | 100 yd (91 m) |
| EF0 | See article on this tornado | | | | | | |
| EF1 | NNW of Lindale | Smith | TX | 32.5656°N 95.4619°W | 00:45–00:48 | 2.99 mi (4.81 km) | 570 yd (520 m) |
| EF1 | See article on this tornado | | | | | | |
| EF1 | E of Mineola | Wood | TX | 32.6496°N 95.4439°W | 00:48–00:49 | 0.3 mi (0.48 km) | 190 yd (170 m) |
| EF1 | Several trees were snapped and uprooted, including one that caused extensive damage to a home upon falling. | | | | | | |

=== April 30 event ===
List of confirmed tornadoes – Sunday, April 30, 2017
| EF# | Location | County / Parish | State | Start Coord. | Time (UTC) | Path length | Max width |
|---|---|---|---|---|---|---|---|
| EF1 | N of Griffithville | White | AR | 35.1512°N 91.7020°W | 05:37–05:47 | 5.86 mi (9.43 km) | 100 yd (91 m) |
| EF1 | A mobile home was shifted off its foundation, several trees were snapped or uprooted, and several other homes sustained minor damage. Outbuildings were damaged or destroyed, with debris lofted into nearby trees. A camper trailer was flipped as well. | | | | | | |
| EF1 | S of Augusta | Woodruff | AR | 35.2275°N 91.3520°W | 05:57–05:58 | 0.76 mi (1.22 km) | 80 yd (73 m) |
| EF1 | Several trees were snapped and a metal shed was damaged. Patio furniture and a grill were tossed around at a residence as well. | | | | | | |
| EF1 | SE of Datto | Clay | AR | 36.3822°N 90.7158°W | 06:25–06:29 | 2.84 mi (4.57 km) | 100 yd (91 m) |
| EF1 | Some grain bins were destroyed, a mobile home was heavily destroyed, a residence lost most of its roof, and a few farm outbuildings were demolished. | | | | | | |
| EF1 | S of Cardwell | Mississippi, Dunklin | AR, MO | 35.9859°N 90.3062°W | 06:56–06:58 | 1.96 mi (3.15 km) | 150 yd (140 m) |
| EF1 | A metal farm building was destroyed. | | | | | | |
| EF1 | Dell | Mississippi | AR | 35.8509°N 90.0657°W | 07:07–07:13 | 5.6 mi (9.0 km) | 150 yd (140 m) |
| EF1 | Minor roof and tree damage occurred in Dell. Elsewhere along the path, a mobile home was destroyed, a frame home sustained minor damage, and metal cotton gin buildings were severely damaged or destroyed. | | | | | | |
| EF1 | NNE of Hornersville | Dunklin | MO | 36.0838°N 90.0974°W | 07:08–07:10 | 1.2 mi (1.9 km) | 100 yd (91 m) |
| EF1 | Some sheds and outbuildings were destroyed and roof damage occurred. An abandoned brick school building collapsed. | | | | | | |
| EF1 | Allport | Lonoke | AR | 34.4852°N 91.8424°W | 07:15–07:22 | 5.12 mi (8.24 km) | 400 yd (370 m) |
| EF1 | Homes in Allport sustained minor shingle damage. Southwest of town, trees were snapped or uprooted, and power poles were also snapped. | | | | | | |
| EF2 | N of Matthews to SSE of Sikeston | New Madrid | MO | 36.7772°N 89.58°W | 07:52–07:56 | 4.04 mi (6.50 km) | 150 yd (140 m) |
| EF2 | A house had its roof ripped off and had part of a rear exterior wall blown inward. A barn and some small sheds were completely destroyed, and two other barns were damaged. Large trees were uprooted and a pickup truck was damaged as well. | | | | | | |
| EF1 | W of Sikes | Winn | LA | 31.9873°N 92.5856°W | 08:07–08:21 | 6.87 mi (11.06 km) | 1,760 yd (1,610 m) |
| EF1 | Some outbuildings sustained damage as a result of this large wedge tornado. Trees were snapped and uprooted, and one home had a tree fall on its patio roof. | | | | | | |
| EF1 | W of Bunkie | Avoyelles | LA | 30.9444°N 92.2257°W | 09:20–09:24 | 0.63 mi (1.01 km) | 95 yd (87 m) |
| EF1 | Tin was ripped off outbuildings, tree limbs were snapped, and a daycare business had its metal roof ripped off. A large tree was toppled onto a carport, damaging it and several vehicles. | | | | | | |
| EF1 | NW of Oak Ridge | Morehouse | LA | 32.5936°N 91.8519°W | 09:44–09:54 | 5.71 mi (9.19 km) | 50 yd (46 m) |
| EF1 | A frame home sustained significant roof damage, a playhouse and shed were completely destroyed, and a few power poles were damaged. | | | | | | |
| EF0 | N of Pleasant Grove | Drew | AR | 33.5438°N 91.7672°W | 10:50–10:52 | 1.13 mi (1.82 km) | 75 yd (69 m) |
| EF0 | Several trees were snapped or uprooted, including some that landed on a house and caused structural damage. Another tree landed on a pickup truck. Mobile homes had skirting and roofing material ripped off, and a frame home had its back porch and part of its roof blown off. Small sheds and outbuildings were destroyed as well. | | | | | | |
| EF2 | Cloverdale | Adams | MS | 31.4795°N 91.4255°W | 11:14–11:24 | 3.44 mi (5.54 km) | 440 yd (400 m) |
| EF2 | A large portion of the roof was ripped off a home in Cloverdale. Numerous trees were snapped and uprooted; one fell on a church while a second fell on a home. Another tree landed on a car, and the roof was blown off of a stable as well. | | | | | | |
| EF1 | SW of Delta to N of Vicksburg | Madison, Warren | LA, MS | 32.289°N 90.9521°W | 12:13–12:27 | 9.24 mi (14.87 km) | 440 yd (400 m) |
| EF1 | A road sign was damaged, numerous trees were snapped and uprooted, and power lines were downed. The garage door of a building was damaged, and power poles were snapped. | | | | | | |
| EF1 | ESE of Fayette to ESE of Port Gibson | Jefferson, Claiborne | MS | 31.6707°N 90.9184°W | 12:24–12:42 | 14.44 mi (23.24 km) | 440 yd (400 m) |
| EF1 | Numerous trees were snapped and uprooted across a rural area. A power pole was snapped, and a few chicken houses sustained extensive roof damage. | | | | | | |
| EF2 | Southern Port Gibson to WNW of Utica | Claiborne, Warren | MS | 31.9338°N 90.9845°W | 12:30–12:55 | 19.9 mi (32.0 km) | 880 yd (800 m) |
| EF2 | This tornado first touched down in the southern part of Port Gibson, where a mobile home was shifted off of its foundation and had skirting ripped off, while a nearby car was spun around. Trees in town were snapped and uprooted, a few of which landed on homes. Further along the path, a large swath of trees was flattened as the tornado moved through heavily forested areas. A school building and an outbuilding sustained roof damage as well. | | | | | | |
| EF0 | NW of Hazelhurst | Copiah | MS | 31.8472°N 90.4507°W | 13:01–13:07 | 5.17 mi (8.32 km) | 100 yd (91 m) |
| EF0 | A few trees were uprooted, with many tree limbs snapped. | | | | | | |
| EF1 | SE of Learned | Hinds | MS | 32.1646°N 90.5739°W | 13:10–13:17 | 6.12 mi (9.85 km) | 300 yd (270 m) |
| EF1 | Dozens of trees were snapped or uprooted, and a power line was downed. | | | | | | |
| EF1 | WNW of Edwards | Hinds, Warren | MS | 32.3406°N 90.6617°W | 13:14–13:18 | 2.73 mi (4.39 km) | 900 yd (820 m) |
| EF1 | A few trees were uprooted, and many large tree branches were snapped. | | | | | | |
| EF1 | S of Bolton to Flora | Hinds, Madison | MS | 32.3026°N 90.4686°W | 13:22–13:47 | 20.34 mi (32.73 km) | 880 yd (800 m) |
| EF1 | A home sustained minor roof damage, a metal tractor shed was destroyed, two power poles were snapped, a mobile home sustained minor damage, and a large billboard was damaged. The tornado struck Flora before dissipating, where buildings sustained minor structural damage in the downtown area and the top of the town's old water tower was blown off. | | | | | | |
| EF1 | SW of Terry | Hinds | MS | 32.0805°N 90.3322°W | 13:23–13:26 | 1.07 mi (1.72 km) | 150 yd (140 m) |
| EF1 | A metal shed lost most of its roof and had a couple walls damaged. A horse trailer was rolled, a home had some of its siding ripped off, and trees were snapped or uprooted. A wooden power pole was bent over as well. | | | | | | |
| EF1 | N of Edwards | Hinds | MS | 32.4101°N 90.5938°W | 13:23–13:33 | 7.14 mi (11.49 km) | 1,800 yd (1,600 m) |
| EF1 | Many trees were snapped or uprooted by this large wedge tornado. | | | | | | |
| EF1 | WNW of Clinton | Hinds | MS | 32.3363°N 90.4138°W | 13:28–13:31 | 2.04 mi (3.28 km) | 500 yd (460 m) |
| EF1 | Numerous trees were snapped and uprooted, power lines were downed, and a semi-truck was overturned. | | | | | | |
| EF0 | Eastern Covington | Tipton | TN | 35.5403°N 89.6447°W | 13:46–13:50 | 2.1 mi (3.4 km) | 100 yd (91 m) |
| EF0 | This weak tornado moved through the eastern edge of Covington. Trees and power poles were damaged along the path. Crestview Middle School sustained minor damage as well. | | | | | | |
| EF1 | Kearney Park | Madison | MS | 32.5864°N 90.3199°W | 13:50–13:54 | 6.02 mi (9.69 km) | 400 yd (370 m) |
| EF1 | This tornado touched down in Kearney Park and moved to the northeast. A small metal warehouse building and several homes in town sustained minor damage. Further along the path, an outbuilding had pieces of metal roofing torn off and blown into nearby trees. Many trees were snapped and uprooted along the path. | | | | | | |
| EF1 | SE of Bentonia | Yazoo, Madison | MS | 32.6166°N 90.3668°W | 13:51–13:57 | 5.04 mi (8.11 km) | 1,500 yd (1,400 m) |
| EF1 | Trees were snapped and uprooted along the path of this large wedge tornado, and a large tree limb fell onto a home. | | | | | | |
| EF2 | ENE of Bentonia to WSW of Pickens | Yazoo | MS | 32.6538°N 90.3195°W | 13:54–14:17 | 21.7 mi (34.9 km) | 2,110 yd (1,930 m) |
| EF2 | Thousands of trees were snapped or uprooted by this massive wedge tornado, which at times exceeded a full mile in width. Some of the trees landed on homes and caused damage. Power poles were snapped, outbuildings were damaged or destroyed, the tin roof was ripped off a mobile home, and frame homes sustained mostly minor damage. | | | | | | |
| EF1 | NE of Bentonia | Yazoo | MS | 32.7771°N 90.1848°W | 14:06–14:14 | 6.88 mi (11.07 km) | 1,003 yd (917 m) |
| EF1 | High-end EF1 wedge tornado caused damage to several structures, including a home that had its entire tin roof ripped off and a residence that sustained damage to its awning. A mobile home was damaged, a barn had its roof blown off, and trees were snapped and uprooted as well. | | | | | | |
| EF2 | WSW of Pickens to Durant | Yazoo, Holmes, Attala | MS | 32.8556°N 90.0951°W | 14:16–14:41 | 23.4 mi (37.7 km) | 1,900 yd (1,700 m) |
| EF2 | 1 death – This very large wedge tornado was well over a mile wide at times. Thousands of trees were snapped or uprooted, and hundreds of power poles and power lines were downed. Multiple frame homes lost large portions of their roofs, and several other homes sustained less severe damage. Four mobile homes were destroyed, including one well-anchored mobile home that was thrown 300 yards and obliterated. A few outbuildings were also damaged or destroyed. The tornado struck Durant directly before dissipating, where many trees were downed and numerous structures had roofing and siding ripped off. A few abandoned brick buildings in the downtown area were largely destroyed. | | | | | | |
| EF1 | NE of Lexington | Holmes, Carroll | MS | 33.1769°N 89.9856°W | 14:38–14:49 | 9.14 mi (14.71 km) | 400 yd (370 m) |
| EF1 | A few trees were uprooted and many tree limbs were snapped. | | | | | | |
| EF0 | Tylertown | Walthall | MS | 31.12°N 90.14°W | 14:39 | —N/a | —N/a |
| EF0 | A brief tornado was reported. No damage occurred. | | | | | | |
| EF0 | NE of Forest | Scott | MS | 32.4074°N 89.3973°W | 14:41–14:47 | 4.28 mi (6.89 km) | 100 yd (91 m) |
| EF0 | Many trees were uprooted, a mobile home sustained minor roof damage and had its skirting blown off, and tin was ripped off of a chicken house. | | | | | | |
| EF1 | NNE of Durant | Holmes | MS | 33.136°N 89.8272°W | 14:42–14:45 | 3.04 mi (4.89 km) | 600 yd (550 m) |
| EF1 | Numerous trees were downed along the path. | | | | | | |
| EF1 | E of West | Attala | MS | 33.15°N 89.7739°W | 14:42–14:46 | 3.85 mi (6.20 km) | 600 yd (550 m) |
| EF1 | Many trees were uprooted, including one that fell on a church. | | | | | | |
| EF0 | N of West | Carroll | MS | 33.2553°N 89.7662°W | 14:51–14:55 | 2.63 mi (4.23 km) | 250 yd (230 m) |
| EF0 | Trees were uprooted, power lines were downed, and a few shingles were ripped off of a house. | | | | | | |
| EF2 | S of Vaiden to NW of Kilmichael | Carroll, Montgomery | MS | 33.3033°N 89.7531°W | 14:58–15:13 | 15.49 mi (24.93 km) | 1,936 yd (1,770 m) |
| EF2 | This strong wedge tornado completely destroyed a large metal I-beam shed, with debris strewn up to 100 yards away. Several smaller sheds were also destroyed. Numerous trees were snapped and uprooted, power lines were downed, and numerous homes sustained roof damage either from the tornado or from falling trees. | | | | | | |
| EF1 | Kilmichael | Montgomery | MS | 33.4156°N 89.5944°W | 15:11–15:15 | 6.63 mi (10.67 km) | 970 yd (890 m) |
| EF1 | High-end EF1 tornado moved directly though Kilmichael. Two sheds were destroyed, dozens of homes in town sustained roof damage from falling trees and the tornado itself, and thousands of trees were snapped or uprooted. A tall communications tower was broken in half, and dozens of power poles and power lines were downed. | | | | | | |
| EF1 | N of Kilmichael | Montgomery | MS | 33.5014°N 89.6045°W | 15:13–15:19 | 5.63 mi (9.06 km) | 800 yd (730 m) |
| EF1 | Many trees were snapped and uprooted along the path. | | | | | | |
| EF1 | NNE of Kilmichael | Montgomery, Webster | MS | 33.529°N 89.5278°W | 15:14–15:20 | 6.76 mi (10.88 km) | 650 yd (590 m) |
| EF1 | Many trees were snapped or uprooted along the path. | | | | | | |
| EF0 | WSW of Tucker | Neshoba | MS | 32.6869°N 89.0975°W | 15:17–15:18 | 0.29 mi (0.47 km) | 50 yd (46 m) |
| EF0 | A few trees were snapped, one of which fell onto a power line. A flag pole was bent in half, and the skirting of a mobile home was damaged. | | | | | | |
| EF1 | NE of Kilmichael | Webster | MS | 33.5792°N 89.5032°W | 15:18–15:23 | 7.44 mi (11.97 km) | 600 yd (550 m) |
| EF1 | Many trees were snapped or uprooted along the path. | | | | | | |
| EF1 | W of Slate Springs | Calhoun | MS | 33.738°N 89.4414°W | 15:26–15:29 | 2.7 mi (4.3 km) | 50 yd (46 m) |
| EF1 | Several outbuildings were damaged and destroyed, and numerous trees were snapped or uprooted. | | | | | | |
| EF1 | NNW of New Hope | Lowndes | MS | 33.4933°N 88.3428°W | 16:37–16:43 | 3.82 mi (6.15 km) | 440 yd (400 m) |
| EF1 | Numerous trees were snapped or uprooted along the path. One tree fell onto a house, destroying the structure. Another home sustained high-end EF1 damage to its roof, power poles were broken, and a scoreboard at a local park was damaged. | | | | | | |
| EF1 | Livonia | Pointe Coupee | LA | 30.5533°N 91.5593°W | 18:15–18:17 | 0.9 mi (1.4 km) | 50 yd (46 m) |
| EF1 | A church had a large portion of its tin roof ripped off, a metal storage building was flipped over onto its roof, and a poorly constructed carport had its tin roof ripped off. Multiple trees were snapped as well. | | | | | | |
| EF0 | E of Zachary | East Baton Rouge | LA | 30.6437°N 91.0843°W | 18:50–18:52 | 0.3 mi (0.48 km) | 40 yd (37 m) |
| EF0 | Four mobile homes sustained minor damage, one of which had its tie-down straps ripped off, and a poorly constructed carport was destroyed. A transmission line connected to another mobile home was ripped off and thrown about 20 feet (6.1 m) up into a tree, and a wooden fence was blown down as well. | | | | | | |
| EF0 | Vinemont | Cullman | AL | 34.24°N 86.87°W | 19:12–19:20 | 10.05 mi (16.17 km) | 215 yd (197 m) |
| EF0 | Trees were snapped and uprooted. A metal roof was blown off a large garage and into a nearby residence. Minor roof and shingle damage also occurred. | | | | | | |

=== May 1 event ===
List of confirmed tornadoes – Monday, May 1, 2017
| EF# | Location | County / Parish | State | Start Coord. | Time (UTC) | Path length | Max width |
|---|---|---|---|---|---|---|---|
| EF0 | Fort Benning | Chattahoochee | GA | 32.34°N 84.928°W | 14:07–14:08 | 0.46 mi (0.74 km) | 50 yd (46 m) |
| EF0 | Trees were snapped or uprooted. | | | | | | |
| EF0 | E of Free Home | Forsyth | GA | 34.2529°N 84.2152°W | 14:24–14:28 | 2.36 mi (3.80 km) | 150 yd (140 m) |
| EF0 | A few large trees were uprooted, and many tree limbs and branches were broken. One tree fell on a mobile home. | | | | | | |
| EF0 | NW of Prospect | Butler | PA | 40.911°N 80.076°W | 18:30–18:33 | 2.86 mi (4.60 km) | 50 yd (46 m) |
| EF0 | Dozens of softwood and hardwood trees were snapped or uprooted. Roof panels on a barn were ripped off, and paneling was removed from a trailer door. A frame home sustained minor damage, and skirting was removed from mobile homes at a mobile home park, where falling trees caused damage to structures and vehicles. Greenhouses were damaged, and a storage container was lofted over one of the greenhouses. | | | | | | |
| EF0 | W of Parker | Butler | PA | 41.092°N 79.732°W | 18:56–18:57 | 0.38 mi (0.61 km) | 50 yd (46 m) |
| EF0 | A brief and narrow tornado snapped or uprooted several trees. | | | | | | |
| EF0 | Beaver Township | Clarion | PA | 41.189°N 79.553°W | 19:09–19:10 | 0.88 mi (1.42 km) | 75 yd (69 m) |
| EF0 | Shingles were ripped from outbuildings, yard items were displaced, and trees were damaged. | | | | | | |
| EF0 | NE of Scotch Hill | Clarion | PA | 41.331°N 79.255°W | 19:25–19:26 | 0.54 mi (0.87 km) | 100 yd (91 m) |
| EF0 | A brief tornado snapped or uprooted dozens of trees. | | | | | | |
| EF0 | Cooksburg | Clarion | PA | 41.331°N 79.224°W | 19:27–19:28 | 0.75 mi (1.21 km) | 75 yd (69 m) |
| EF0 | Dozens of trees were snapped or uprooted by this brief tornado. | | | | | | |
| EF1 | Green Township | Clarion, Forest | PA | 41.408°N 79.355°W | 19:27–19:31 | 2.23 mi (3.59 km) | 100 yd (91 m) |
| EF1 | An extensive swath of trees were snapped and uprooted, damaging several cabins upon falling. | | | | | | |
| EF2 | SE of Marienville (1st tornado) | Forest | PA | 41.424°N 79.098°W | 19:40–19:42 | 0.9 mi (1.4 km) | 350 yd (320 m) |
| EF2 | An initially narrow tornado grew in scale rapidly with several embedded sub-vortices, causing considerable and widespread damage to hardwood and softwood trees over a nearly mile-long path. This path was documented via aerial imagery after being discovered and documented by Forest Service personnel. | | | | | | |
| EF2 | SE of Marienville (2nd tornado) | Forest, Elk | PA | 41.432°N 79.074°W | 19:42–19:44 | 1.1 mi (1.8 km) | 175 yd (160 m) |
| EF2 | A narrow, convergent path of intense damage was documented via aerial imagery after being discovered and documented by Forest Service personnel. Damage consisted entirely of uprooted and snapped hardwood and softwood trees. | | | | | | |
| EF0 | SE of Newton | Catawba | NC | 35.61°N 81.20°W | 19:54–19:58 | 2.67 mi (4.30 km) | 50 yd (46 m) |
| EF0 | Intermittent tornado snapped or uprooted many large trees, some of which landed on structures and caused damage. Minor roof, siding, and window damage also occurred. | | | | | | |
| EF1 | Dahoga | Elk | PA | 41.5884°N 78.7435°W | 20:08–20:09 | 1.68 mi (2.70 km) | 200 yd (180 m) |
| EF1 | Numerous trees were knocked down along the path. | | | | | | |
| EF1 | Rebersburg | Centre | PA | 40.9386°N 77.4583°W | 22:44–22:45 | 1.1 mi (1.8 km) | 100 yd (91 m) |
| EF1 | Several dozen homes and outbuildings in town were damaged, and dozens of trees were snapped or uprooted. A utility pole was snapped, and one person was injured when a work shed collapsed onto him. | | | | | | |

== See also ==
- Weather of 2017
- List of North American tornadoes and tornado outbreaks
- Tornadoes of 2017
  - List of United States tornadoes in April 2017
- Lists of tornadoes and tornado outbreaks
