= 2017 East Texas tornadoes =

2017 tornado outbreak in Texas, USA

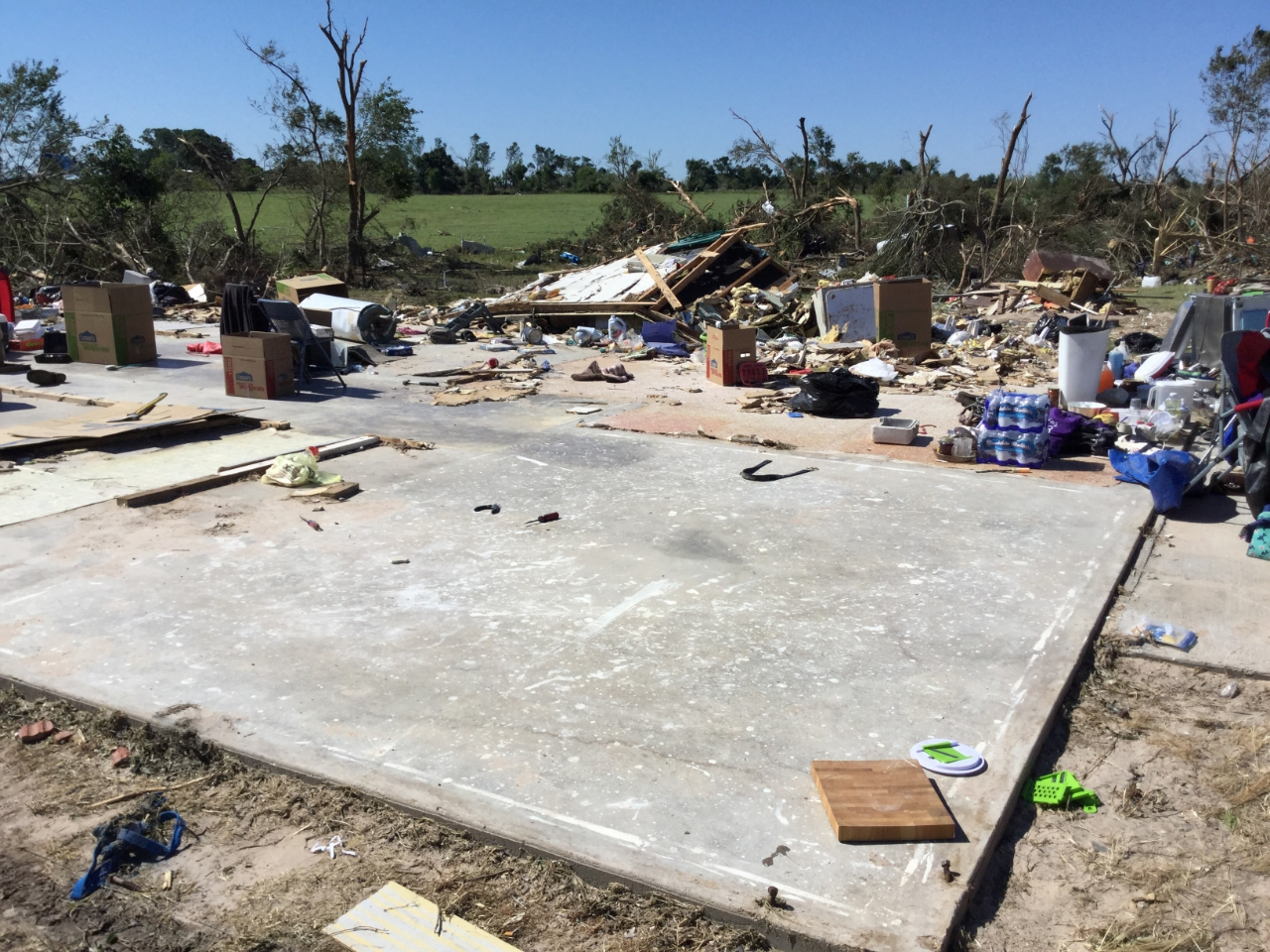
- A well built house along VZ County Road 2301 southeast of Canton destroyed by a tornado at mid-range EF4 strength. Three occupants survived with non-fatal injuries.

Meteorological history
- Date: April 29, 2017

Tornado outbreak
- Tornadoes: 8 (Note: This count consists of only the tornadoes that struck East Texas on April 29, and does not represent the number of tornadoes produced during the entire outbreak sequence.)
- Max. rating: EF4 tornado
- Duration: 3 hours, 15 minutes
- Highest winds: 180 mph (290 km/h) (Eustace–Canton, Texas EF4)

Overall effects
- Fatalities: 4
- Injuries: >49
- Damage: >$1,000,000 (2017 USD)
- Areas affected: Eastern Texas, namely Henderson, Van Zandt, Rains, and Hopkins County.
- Part of the Tornado outbreak and floods of April 28 – May 1, 2017 and tornado outbreaks of 2017

During the evening hours of Saturday, April 29, 2017, multiple tornadoes, some large, destructive, and deadly, moved through the East Texas counties of Henderson, Van Zandt, Rains, and Hopkins. Over the course of 3 hours and 15 minutes, the tornadoes killed four people, injured over 49, and wrought severe damage across the area. The strongest of the tornadoes were given mid-range EF4, low-end EF3, and mid-range EF2 ratings respectively by the National Weather Service (NWS) in Fort Worth/Dallas, Texas.

Although the environment that day otherwise would not have been in favor of any widespread tornado outbreak, previous thunderstorms left an outflow boundary in the region, which resulted in numerous favorable conditions coming together and allowing thunderstorms along the boundary to rapidly intensify into large tornadic supercells. Two minor EF0 tornadoes first formed in Van Zandt County prior to the strongest tornado of the event, a large, rain wrapped tornado that began in Henderson County. The tornado tracked north/northeastwards, reaching EF2 strength southeast of Eustace before weakening as it entered Van Zandt County. The tornado intensified back to EF2 strength shortly after, damaging or destroying multiple structures as it moved north-northeastwards towards the Canton area. Passing between Phalba and Tundra, the tornado rapidly intensified to EF4 strength, destroying a well-built two story brick home. Weakening to EF3 strength, the tornado began to turn towards the northwest, striking the community of Jackson. The tornado damaged or destroyed numerous structures southwest of Canton before rapidly weakening and dissipating near High, leaving two people dead and 25 more injured.

As the EF4 tornado was ongoing, another supercell produced a separate tornado in Henderson County. The tornado, moving northeastwards, first reached EF1 strength near Stockard. As it moved to the east of Eustace, the tornado intensified to EF2 strength and blew a house off of its foundation. The tornado then gradually weakened, causing tree damage before dissipating south of Big Rock, with multiple injuries attributed to the tornado. The same supercell then quickly cycled and produced another tornado on the Henderson-Van Zandt county border. The tornado moved north-northeastwards, reaching EF1 strength east of Denman Crossroads. Passing to the east of Tundra, the tornado strengthened further to EF2 strength, destroying multiple structures as it continued into the eastern side of Canton. There, many buildings, including a dealership, were damaged or destroyed as the tornado intensified to EF3 strength, and one woman was killed when her vehicle was thrown from the road. Exiting Canton, the tornado weakened back to EF2 strength, causing widespread tree damage. The tornado then turned northeast into Fruitvale, where multiple structures were damaged or destroyed before the tornado exited town and weakened to EF0 strength, turning north-northeastwards into Rains County. The tornado then intensified back to EF1 strength, causing tree damage and isolated damage to structures. The tornado briefly reached EF2 strength southeast of Emory, severely damaging multiple structures before weakening back to EF0 strength. The tornado turned almost due northwards and crossed the Lake Fork Reservoir before dissipating east of Dougherty, leaving two people dead and 24 others injured. Three more weak tornadoes touched down, two EF0 tornadoes in Van Zandt County and an EF1 tornado in Hopkins County.

== Meteorological synopsis ==
=== Progression through April 26–28 ===
On April 26, 2017, the Storm Prediction Center (SPC) outlined a 30% risk for severe weather over northeastern Texas, southeastern Oklahoma, southwestern Arkansas, and northwestern Louisiana, encompassed by a larger 15% risk area. A shortwave trough was expected to amplify over the southern Rocky Mountains and move eastwards through the southern Great Plains, accompanied by a strong cold front. Severe thunderstorms were expected to develop along the boundary, moving eastwards through Texas and into the lower Mississippi Valley, where the atmosphere would be “moderately to strongly unstable”.

The following day, April 27, at 07:22 UTC, the SPC outlined an enhanced (3 out of 5) categorical risk, or 30% probabilistic risk, over the previous area of the 15% and 30% risks. Downstream from the aforementioned shortwave trough, an upper ridge was expected to build up over the eastern states. At the surface, a quasi-stationary front would extend from the Ohio Valley into Oklahoma. A cold front would then merge with the boundary and continue southeastwards through Oklahoma and Texas into the lower Mississippi Valley. Storms ongoing in Arkansas, Missouri, and Oklahoma would pose threats of strong wind gusts and hail. A moist and strongly unstable warm sector will reside across east-central Texas into the lower Mississippi Valley. However, a capping inversion would also limit thunderstorm development across most of Texas prior to the arrival of deeper forcing for ascent accompanying the shortwave trough and cold front later in the afternoon. Strong vertical shear and large hodographs would be present in the warm sector, but initiation was expected to remain confined to the cold frontal zone where storms were more likely to be undercut as they evolved into linear modes. Despite the limited storm development, embedded supercells and bowing segments were likely. Large hail and damaging wind were of the primary threats, but a few tornadoes would also be possible as activity developed through eastern Texas and the lower Mississippi Valley.

On April 28, at 17:41 UTC, the SPC extended their enhanced risk to stretch into southern Missouri, now accompanied by a smaller 45% probabilistic risk for severe weather in Texas, Oklahoma, Arkansas, and Louisiana. Severe thunderstorms were expected to form and pose threats of large hail, damaging winds, and tornadoes. Weather vapor imagery denoted an amplifying mid-level trough situated over the western United States, as a ridge built over the Southeast coast. A mid-level low would develop and move eastwards from the Four Corners into the Texas Panhandle and western Oklahoma. In the lower levels, a surface low initially situated over the southern Plains would slowly move northeast into the Ozarks, while a stationary frontal zone sat east-northeast from central Oklahoma through Missouri and into the Ohio Valley. An arctic cold front moved southwards into the Permian Basin, and a Pacific cold front combined and accelerated southeastwards across Texas and into the lower Sabine Valley by Sunday, April 30. Strong low-level southerly flow would advect a maritime tropical airmass, consisting of lowest 100-mb mean mixing ratios (at or above 16 g/kg) and translating to 70-74 degree F surface dewpoints, into much of the warm sector across Arkansas, Louisiana, Texas, and northeastwards into northern portions of the lower Mississippi Valley. Ongoing thunderstorms were likely across portions of Oklahoma near the terminus of a 60-kt low level jet as the cold front encroached on the warm sector. Isolated severe hail and severe gusts were possible with the initial activity.

An elevated mixed layer and capping inversion allowed a very unstable boundary layer (MLCAPE 2500-4000 J/kg) to develop to the south of convective outflow and cloud debris across southeast Oklahoma & Arkansas and into east-central Texas. Weather models indicated storm development moving southwestwards into north-central Texas during the afternoon of April 29 in association with a couple of storm clusters. The more substantial severe risk was to be timed with the ejection of a strong mid-level vorticity maximum moving eastwards into the southern Plains during the late afternoon and through the overnight. More uncertain was the potential development of quasi-discrete storms developing ahead of the front. Any supercells that managed to develop and sustain themselves in the moisture-rich environment with a sizable hodograph were probable to pose a tornadic threat. As the mid-level wave turned into the region, strengthening effective shear profiles from 30-kt to 45-60 kt produced favorable conditions for a mature squall line moving eastward across this region and moving into Arkansas and Louisiana. The threat for severe gusts and associated wind damage were expected to become more widespread in Arkansas, Louisiana, and Texas after nightfall.

=== April 29 ===
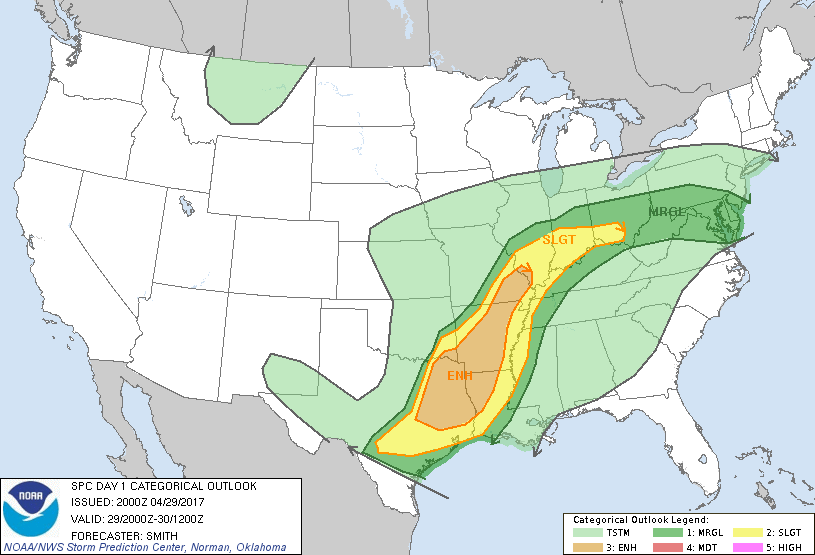
The Storm Prediction Center's Day 1 2000 UTC outlook for April 29, denoting an enhanced risk from Eastern Texas continuing into southwestern Illinois.

On April 29, at the 06:00 UTC outlook, the SPC continued their enhanced risk, alongside a 5% risk for tornadoes, lasting through the 1300, 1630, and 2000 UTC outlooks. Strong winds associated with the aforementioned upper low would translate across west Texas and the southern Plains that night, alongside by 150–180 m height falls at 500 mb. At lower levels in advance of the upper low, a broad low-level jet was placed over parts of Texas, Oklahoma, Louisiana, and Arkansas, with 50-60 kt winds in the 1–2 km agl level. This would provide strong low-level shear on April 29, with strengthening deep-layer shear progressing eastward across the southern plains towards the lower Mississippi Valley that night.

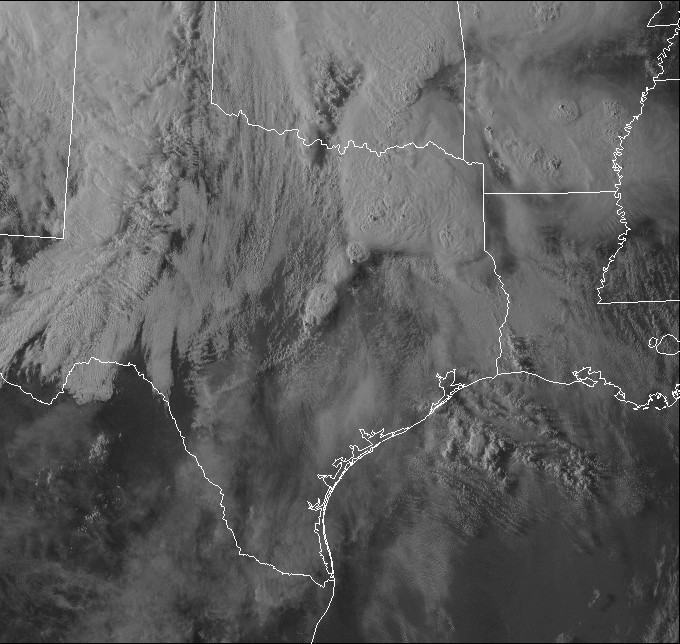
Satellite imagery of the storm system and tornado producing supercells over eastern Texas at 23:30 UTC on April 29, not long after the Storm Prediction Center issued their 20:00 UTC outlook.

A ridge of high pressure centered over the Atlantic Ocean, allowing high levels of atmospheric pressure originating from the Gulf of Mexico to focus along the front. This caused thunderstorm training (clusters of heavy rain and thunderstorms slowly progressing eastwards). For the next six hours, the front remained mostly indifferent as it moved slightly eastwards, although a squall line was beginning to form, increasing the threat for large hail, damaging wind gusts and a few tornadoes. Although the overall setup that day was not favorable for a widespread tornado outbreak, thunderstorms from earlier in the day left behind an outflow boundary across northeastern Texas, resulting in a localized area of enhanced low-level helicity. Deep moisture, high levels of CAPE, and low LCL heights were also present in the area as multiple thunderstorms rode the boundary and dramatically intensified into large tornadic supercells, going on to produce the East Texas tornadoes.

== Event summary ==
=== Eustace–West Canton tornado ===
Eustace–West Canton, Texas
- A view of the violent tornado behind trees.

Meteorological history
- Formed: April 29, 2017, 5:29 p.m. CDT (UTC−06:00)
- Dissipated: April 29, 2017, 6:09 p.m. CDT (UTC−06:00)
- Duration: 40 minutes

EF4 tornado
- on the Enhanced Fujita scale
- Max width: 1,760 yards (1.00 mi; 1.61 km)
- Path length: 23.80 miles (38.30 km)
- Highest winds: 180 mph (290 km/h)

Overall effects
- Fatalities: 2
- Injuries: 25
- Damage: Unknown
- Areas affected: Henderson County and Van Zandt County, Texas

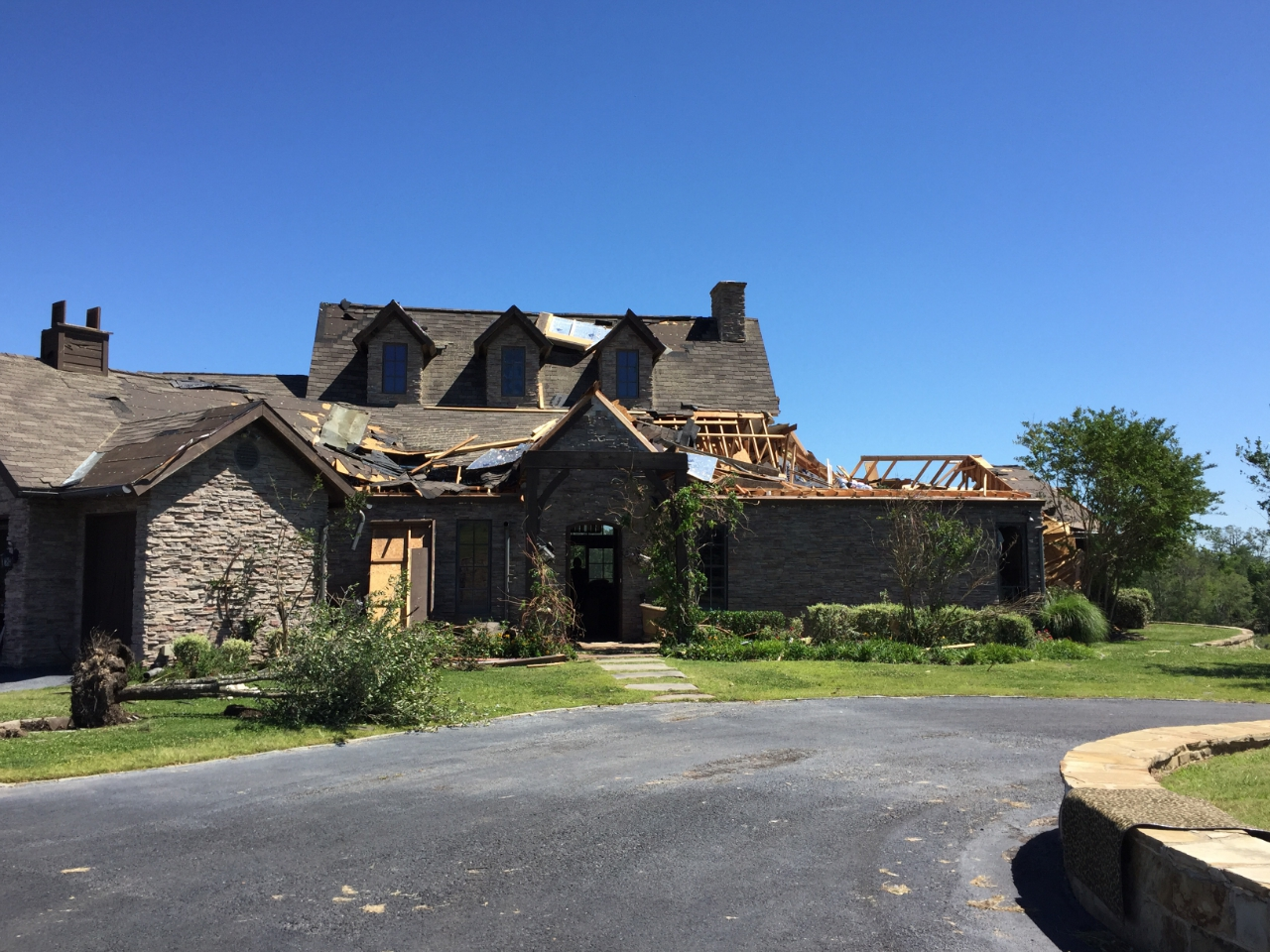
A house to the southeast of Eustace that sustained major roof damage when the tornado struck at mid-range EF2 strength.

At 5:29 p.m. CDT (UTC−05:00), the third and strongest of eight tornadoes to strike Eastern Texas initiated in northwestern Henderson County, 2 miles (3.2 km) north of Log Cabin, three miles due south of Eustace, and just off of the Cedar Creek Reservoir, prompting a particularly dangerous situation (PDS) tornado warning. Moving northeastwards, this rain-wrapped tornado initially caused minor EF0 damage, snapping branches off of hardwood trees along County Road 2813. On County Road 2858, hardwood trees were uprooted, and a manufactured home sustained minor roof damage. The tornado then crossed FM 2329, continuing to cause minor tree damage and downing a wooden fence before turning due northwards, intensifying to mid-range EF2 strength as it impacted multiple houses on Goodell Lane. One house had the majority of its roof system torn away, and just to the north, hardwood trees had their bark stripped away (although branches remained), and another house lost a considerable portion of its roof system. The tornado then turned northeastwards, maintaining its strength and rapidly widening as it crossed US 175 W to the southeast of Eustace, collapsing a microwave tower. The tornado weakened to EF1 strength as it crossed FM 2709, where a double-wide manufactured home slid off of its CMU block piers, wood poles were broken, and hardwood trees were snapped. The tornado then turned back northwards, widening once again as it snapped and uprooted softwood & hardwood trees and removed part of the roof system along FM 1861. The tornado then entered southwestern Van Zandt County.

Upon entering Van Zandt County, the tornado turned to the northwest and then north-northeastwards as it passed to the west of Big Rock, then intensified to mid-range EF2 strength once again as it crossed the intersection of VM County Roads 2901 and 2908. There, a manufactured home was completely blown away, one house had the entirety of its roof structure removed, and another slid off of its foundation entirely. Continuing along VM County Road 2908, the tornado completely removed the roof system of another house, destroyed an outbuilding, and removed a considerable portion of another house's roof system. In one of these houses, a couple had received warning of the tornadoes just minutes prior, and the son and girlfriend mentioned that they were leaving, but were told to stay and wait for the weather to pass. Once they caught sight of the tornado, everyone sheltered inside the home and survived without injuries. If they had not been able to drive out of the tornado in time, they would have been in “grave danger”, in their vehicle with nowhere to shelter. Further to the northeast, a manufactured home along FM 1256 was completely blown away, and a house along VZ County Road 2313 had its exterior walls collapsed.

As the tornado passed between Phalba and Tundra, the tornado rapidly intensified, first causing mid-range EF3 damage as it collapsed the majority of the walls excluding the small interior rooms of a house, destroyed a metal building system, and flipped multiple cars numerous times. Along VZ County Road 2301, the tornado further intensified to its peak strength of mid-range EF4, completely destroying a well-built two-story brick home with winds of 180 miles per hour (290 km/h). Three occupants, having received the tornado warning, moved from a trailer home out front to the brick house. Both were destroyed when the tornado struck, but all three occupants only sustained non-life-threatening injuries. A 51-year-old man who had been in the area for a wedding was not as fortunate, and was killed when the tornado struck. Two manufactured homes along VM County Road 2306 were blown away. The tornado then weakened back to low-end EF3 strength, snapping softwood & hardwood trees and damaging a metal building system. The tornado then veered towards the northwest, impacting multiple residences along FM 1651. Multiple houses had their exterior walls removed, manufactured homes were blown away, and numerous hardwood trees were partially debarked. A car in the area was thrown approximately 250 yards south from its original location and left resting on its side.

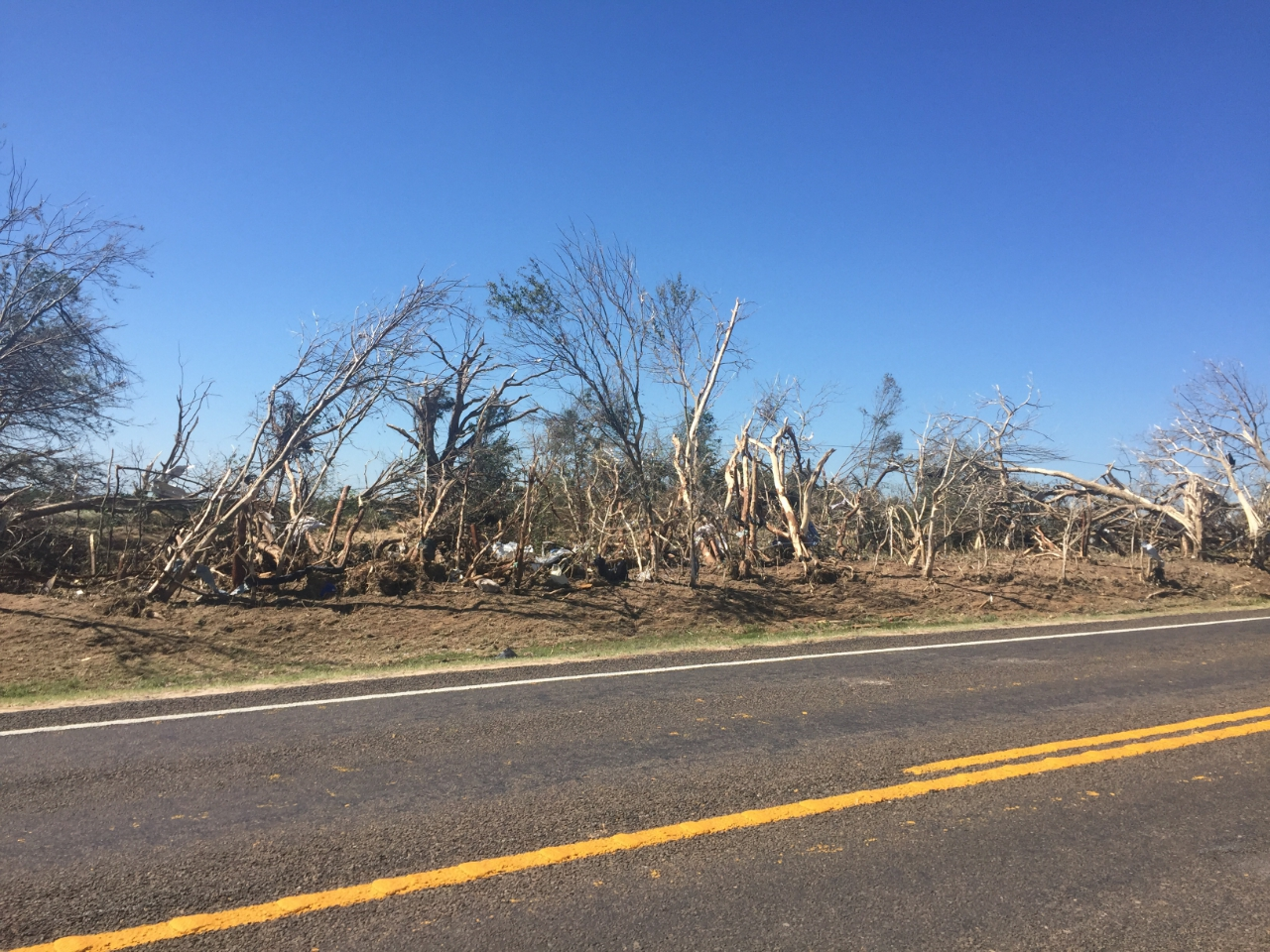
Severe tree damage along TX 198

Continuing north-northwestwards, the tornado maintained EF3 strength as it struck the community of Jackson along TX 198, blowing away a single-wide manufactured home, demolishing multiple high tension towers, completely debarking hardwood trees, and reaching its peak width of one mile. The tornado then crossed VZ County Road 2434, collapsing most or all exterior walls of four houses. On the adjacent FM 3227, hardwood trees were denuded and debarked, and a house lost its entire roof system & a portion of an exterior wall. As the tornado crossed VZ County Road 2511, it collapsed the exterior walls of multiple houses, leaving one only with its interior rooms. In one such house, two people received Wireless Emergency Alert (WEA) messages prior to the tornado's approach, and survived without injury after taking shelter in a closet. A car in the area was thrown across the road, coming to rest on its side, and hardwood trees in the area were snapped.

The tornado weakened to high-end EF2 strength shortly thereafter, decreasing in size as it passed through the western outskirts of Canton and approached Wallace. The tornado first caused extreme tree damage and ground scouring visible from satellite imagery following the tornado, then blew away a manufactured home on TX 243 as it passed through the eastern side of Wallace. Just to the north, the tornado impacted multiple structures to the southeast of High, destroying two outbuildings and collapsing the walls of another. A house sustained damage to its roof system, and another had its exterior walls collapsed. The tornado then rapidly weakened to EF0 strength, causing minor roof damage to a house and manufactured home before dissipating along VZ County Road 2120 at 6:09 p.m. CDT (UTC−05:00) approximately 4.7 miles (7.6 km) west-northwest of Canton.

In the wake of the tornado, 2 people were killed, and a further 25 were injured. The tornado was on the ground for 40 minutes over a path 23.80 miles (38.30 km) long, reaching a peak width of one mile and a peak strength of mid-range EF4 with winds up to 180 miles per hour (290 km/h), upgraded from a preliminary rating of EF3. More than 50 homes were damaged or destroyed. This tornado also nearly impacted a storm chaser whose vehicle was stuck in mud.

=== Log Cabin tornado ===
Log Cabin, Texas
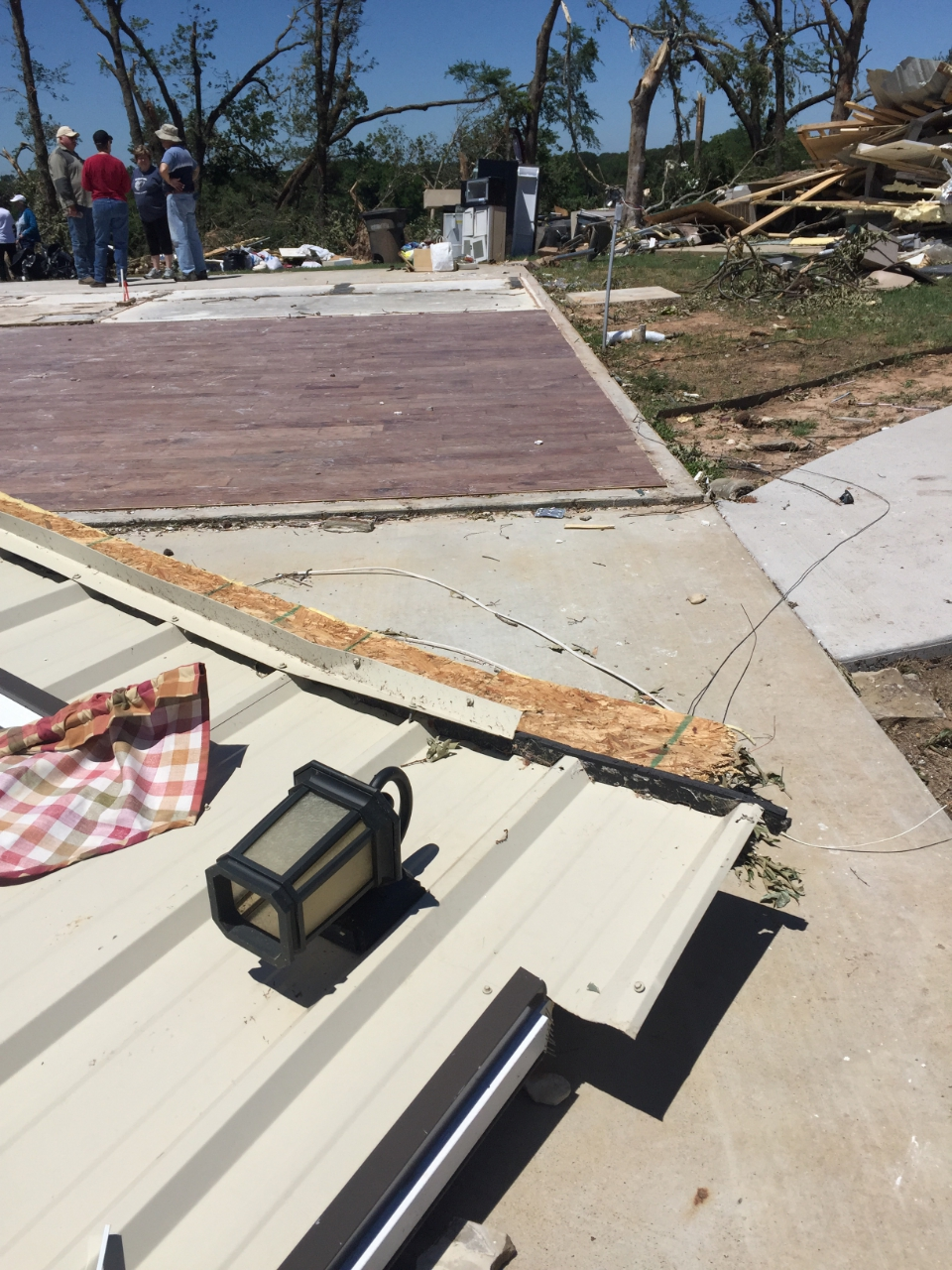
- A house along FM 2709 east of Eustace that slid off of its foundation when the tornado struck at mid-range EF2 strength. Surveyors did not note any anchor bolts.

Meteorological history
- Formed: April 29, 2017, 5:41 p.m. CDT (UTC−06:00)
- Dissipated: April 29, 2017, 6:04 p.m. CDT (UTC−06:00)
- Duration: 23 minutes

EF2 tornado
- on the Enhanced Fujita scale
- Max width: 100 yards (0.057 mi; 0.091 km)
- Path length: 6.50 miles (10.46 km)
- Highest winds: 125 mph (201 km/h)

Overall effects
- Fatalities: 0
- Injuries: Multiple
- Damage: Unknown
- Areas affected: Henderson County, Texas

At 5:41 p.m. CDT (UTC−06:00), as the Eustace–West Canton tornado was ongoing, a separate supercell produced a new tornado, the fourth of eight, just over 3 miles (4.8 km) to the northeast of Log Cabin. The tornado moved northeastwards and crossed US 175 to the northwest of Stockard, causing minor EF0 damage as it snapped branches off of hardwood trees. The tornado then intensified to EF1 strength, snapping hardwood trees. As it crossed over Clear Creek to the northeast, the tornado intensified further to mid-range EF2 strength, then impacted two structures along FM 2709 at its peak strength of 125 mph. Upon receiving tornado warnings, an elderly woman moved from her manufactured home to a newer structure to be with her family. The home she had previously been in was destroyed and moved entirely off of its foundation. The newer structure was mostly destroyed, but walls remained. Nobody died in that structure, but multiple significant injuries occurred. Surveyors stated that it was “unlikely that anyone would have survived in the southern structure given the catastrophic structural failure that occurred”. Hardwood trees nearby were snapped & partially debarked. The tornado weakened back to EF1 strength as it crossed County Road 2912, uprooting hardwood trees. Crossing County Road 2804 just to the northeast, the tornado snapped hardwood trees before weakening and dissipating in the Melton Rock region at 6:04 p.m. CDT, approximately five miles northeast of Eustace.

This tornado caused no fatalities, although "multiple" injuries were documented. It was on the ground for 23 minutes over a path 6.50 miles (10.46 km) long, reaching a peak width of 100 yards and a peak strength of mid-range EF2 with winds up to 125 miles per hour (201 km/h).

Shortly after the dissipation of the Log Cabin–Southwest Canton tornado and as the Eustace–West Canton tornado was dissipating, the parent supercell cycled and produced a fifth tornado at 6:08 p.m. CDT, 14 miles to the south of Canton.

=== East Canton–Fruitvale–Emory tornado ===
East Canton–Fruitvale–Emory, Texas
- The tornado as it was passing east of Canton.

Meteorological history
- Formed: April 29, 2017, 6:08 p.m. CDT (UTC−06:00)
- Dissipated: April 29, 2017, 7:28 p.m. CDT (UTC−06:00)
- Duration: 1 hour, 20 minutes

EF3 tornado
- on the Enhanced Fujita scale
- Max width: 1,760 yards (1.00 mi; 1.61 km)
- Path length: 44.84 miles (72.16 km)
- Highest winds: 145 mph (233 km/h)

Overall effects
- Fatalities: 2
- Injuries: 24
- Damage: $670,000 (2017 USD)
- Areas affected: Henderson County, Van Zandt County, and Rains County, Texas.

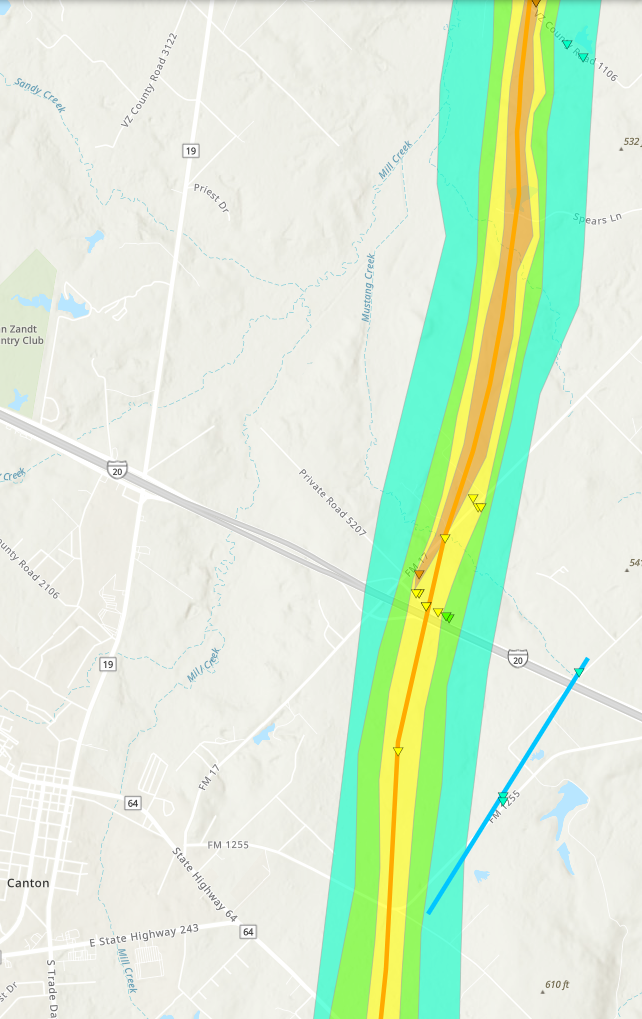
Damage track of the tornado as it moved through the eastern side of Canton and surrounding areas, with another EF0 tornado striking some of the same areas. Key EF0 65–85 mph EF1 86–110 mph EF2 111–135 mph EF3 136–165 mph

This tornado initially caused minor EF0 damage as it moved northeastwards, removing the roof panels of an outbuilding and uprooting hardwood trees. Turning north-northeastwards, the tornado intensified to EF1 strength east of Denman Crossroads, causing roof damage to a house and twisting sheet metal in trees. The Rustic Barn, a ceremony and wedding venue in the area, was destroyed. There were 20 occupants inside the structure when the tornado hit, though, remarkably, no injuries occurred there, as everyone gathered into a 12x12 room to ride out the storm. The tornado then uprooted hardwood trees and caused severe roof damage to a house, visible from Google Earth satellite imagery. The tornado continued to cause minor tree damage as it moved north-northeastwards, uprooting hardwood trees along VZ County Road 2319 before intensifying to low-end EF2 strength east of Tundra. Along VZ County Road 2318, an outbuilding and manufactured home were both destroyed, and a nearby house sustained roof damage & had its windows blown out. Along TX 19, a manufactured home was almost completely destroyed, save for its undercarriage. Just to the northeast, a building sustained roof damage and an outbuilding was destroyed. The tornado snapped hardwood trees, then struck two houses along County Road 4204, collapsing the exterior walls of both. Along FM 2909 and VZ County Road 4102, three more manufactured homes were blown away at high-end EF2 strength.

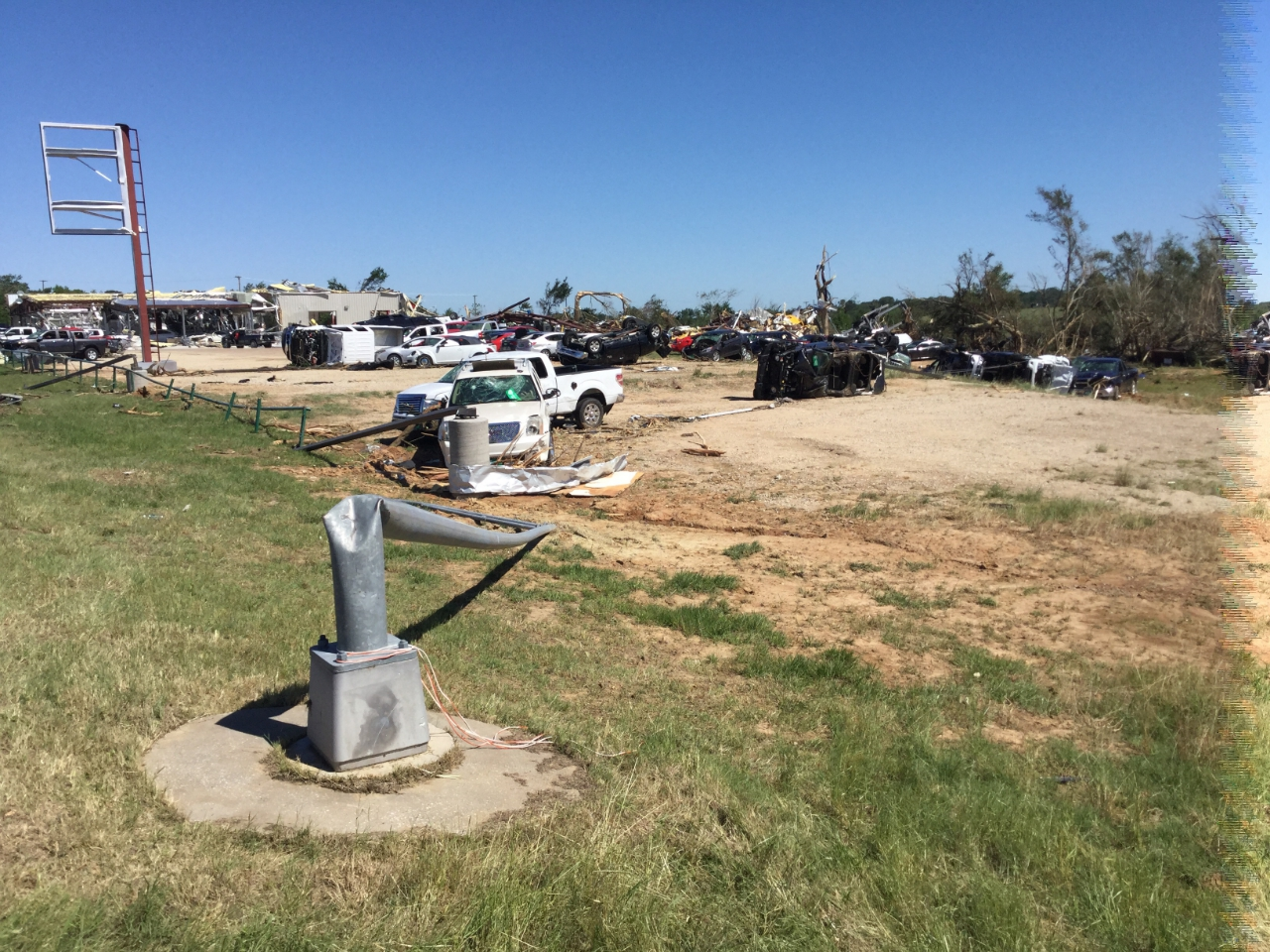
EF2 damage at the Dodge dealership in Canton, where multiple motorcyclists took shelter. Note the overturned cars and bent metal pole.

The tornado turned due north and moved through the eastern outskirts of Canton, for which another PDS tornado warning had been issued at approximately 6:00 CDT prior to its arrival. The tornado first crossed the eastern edge of Mill Creek Lake and caused significant roof damage to a house, destroying its attached garage and heavily damaging a barn in the backyard. Hardwood trees were snapped before the tornado turned north-northeastwards once more and approached & crossed I-20. Numerous metal truss towers were toppled to the ground as it neared the interstate, and upon its arrival, a metal building was severely damaged, and a Dodge dealership was destroyed, with multiple cars in the parking lot being "thrown like toys". There, several motorcyclists parked their cars underneath an overhang and survived without injury despite the damage sustained to the building. One woman was killed as the tornado lifted her vehicle up from the road and threw it into an open field, alongside multiple others that were swept from the interstate into a ravine. Other cars originating from the dealership were thrown up to 0.5 miles (0.80 km) away, with their showroom license plates still attached. The tornado further intensified to low-end EF3 strength, severely damaging the roof of a restaurant and damaging or destroying two metal building systems & removing part of the roof structure from a single-wide manufactured home before exiting Canton.

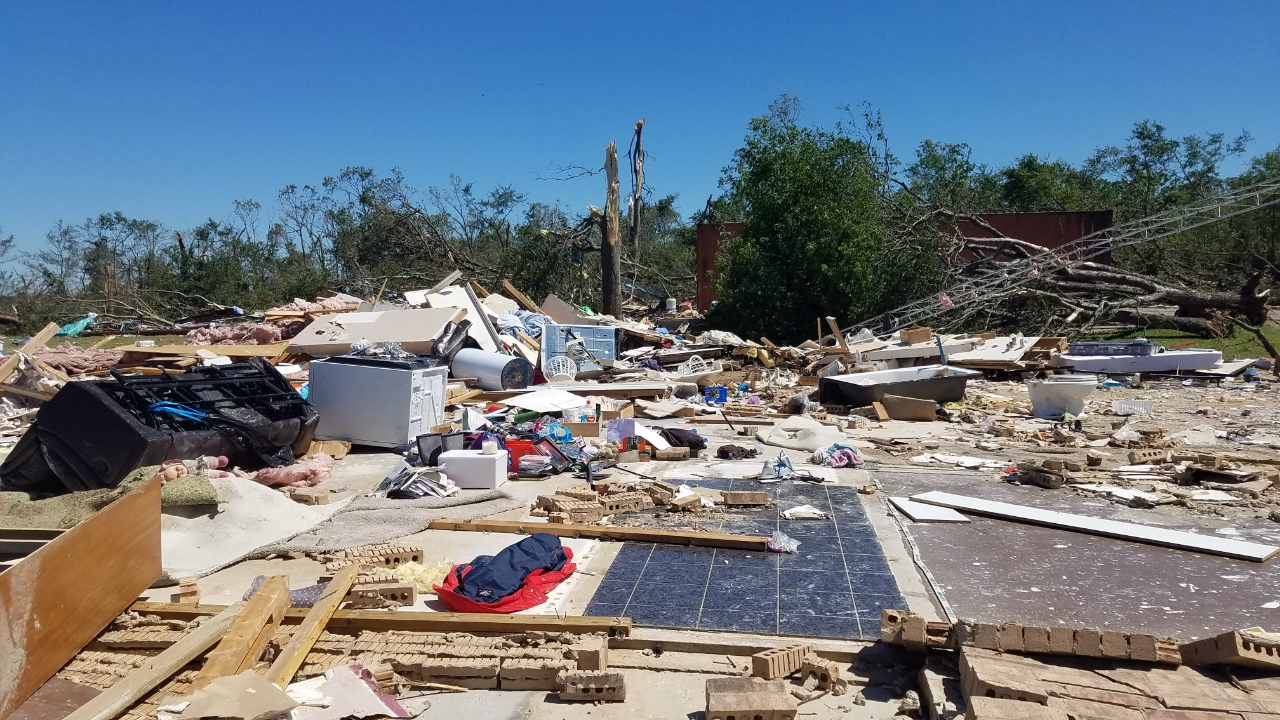
A house along VZ County Road 1106 northeast of Canton that was destroyed at mid-range EF3 strength and had all of its walls collapsed, although the attachments of such walls were described as "poor" by surveyors.

Along VZ County Road 1106, the tornado reached its peak strength, collapsing the exterior walls of one home and all walls of another with winds up to 145 miles per hour (233 km/h), although the attachment of walls on the latter home was described as poor, “every two feet or so”. The tornado then weakened to mid-range EF2 strength immediately afterwards, snapping and partially debarking hardwood trees. The tornado continued to snap and uproot hardwood trees as it passed to the west of Lawrence Springs before abruptly turning northeastwards into the western side of Fruitvale at 6:15 p.m. CDT and beginning to narrow in size. There, the tornado severely damaged the steel roof structure of a high school building, overturning a nearby truck, removed the majority or all of the roof structure from two houses, and blew away a manufactured home. Exiting Fruitvale, the tornado weakened to EF1 strength as it snapped hardwood trees, then weakened further to EF0 strength and narrowed greatly in size, damaging the roof of a manufactured home and uprooting hardwood trees. The tornado turned back north-northeastwards, entering Rains County to the southwest of Bellview.

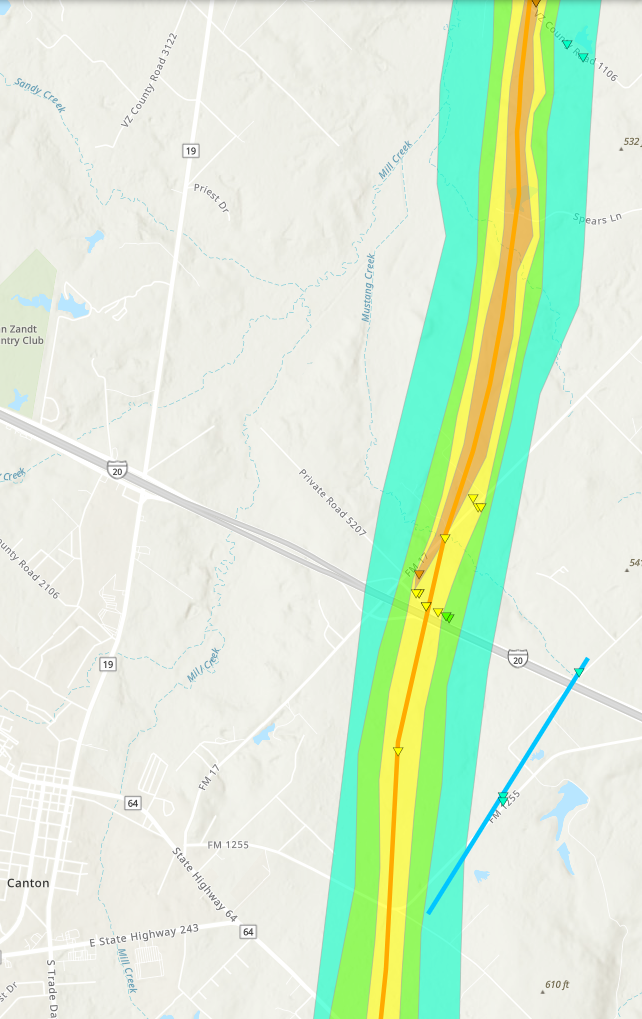
Damage track of the tornado as it moved through the eastern side of Canton and surrounding areas, with another EF0 tornado striking some of the same areas.

Upon entering Rains County, the tornado continued to uproot hardwood trees, blowing the roof panels off of a barn and beginning to increase greatly in size. As it crossed over RS County Road 2355, the tornado intensified back to EF1 strength, destroying a barn and blowing down a large swath of trees. The tornado then struck Willow Springs, maintaining EF1 strength, removing all of the roof covering from a house and blowing a manufactured home onto its side along FM 3274. Further to the north, a nursery sustained major damage and multiple surrounding outbuildings were destroyed, along with dozens of trees blown down on RS County Road 2234. Crossing US 69 between Emory and Ginger, the tornado briefly intensified to high-end EF2 strength, removing parts of the roof structure from one house and shifting another off of its foundation entirely. In one house that had its roof removed and exterior walls collapsed, an elderly couple had received information of the tornado's approach from a live broadcast. Seemingly in accordance with severe weather recommendations, the couple took shelter in a hallway & rode out the tornado. Based on their testimony and examination of the damage done to the house and surrounding vegetation, surveyors believed that their survival was directly tied to their action. Weakening to EF1 strength, the tornado impacted multiple structures. Two outbuildings had their walls collapsed, a building sustained roof damage, a manufactured home had its roof completely removed, and multiple hardwood trees were uprooted. The tornado then weakened further to EF0 strength, causing roof damage to two more outbuildings before narrowing rapidly in size and crossing the northwestern edge of the Lake Fork Reservoir. Making landfall on the north side of the reservoir, the tornado downed trees, visible from Google Earth satellite imagery, before dissipating along FM 514 east of Dougherty at 7:28 p.m. CDT.

In the wake of the tornado, 2 people were killed, and 24 were injured. The tornado was on the ground for 1 hour and 20 minutes over a 44.84 miles (72.16 km) long path, reaching a peak width of 1 mile (1.6 km) and a peak strength of low-end EF3 with winds up to 145 miles per hour (233 km/h). Several homes, businesses, and farm buildings were damaged or destroyed.

=== Other tornadoes ===
Eight tornadoes in total struck East Texas on April 29, the EF4, EF3, and EF2 tornadoes in Henderson, Van Zandt, and Rains counties being the three strongest and only significant tornadoes. The other five tornadoes consisted of four EF0 rated tornadoes in Van Zandt County and one EF1 rated tornado in Hopkins County. Initially, only seven tornadoes were confirmed as a result of the event. After subsequent reanalysis in July and August 2025, an eighth EF0 tornado was confirmed in Van Zandt County on the western side of Canton.

List of additional tornadoes – Saturday, April 29, 2017 (Note: This list excludes tornadoes occurring outside of Texas & the EF4, EF2, and EF3 tornadoes mentioned in the previous sections.) (Note: All dates are based on the local time zone where the tornado touched down; however, all times are in Coordinated Universal Time for consistency.)
EF#	Location	County / Parish	State	Start Coord.	Time (UTC)	Path length	Max width	Summary
EF0	NE of Big Rock to S of Tundra	Van Zandt	TX	32.39°N 95.91°W	21:46–21:49	2.03 mi (3.27 km)	75 yd (69 m)	This high-end EF0 tornado south of FM 1256 moved northeast, blowing down several trees in various directions. A large barn lost part of its west-side roof before the tornado lifted. This tornado was discovered in July 2025 from high-resolution satellite imagery.
EF0	E of Canton	Van Zandt	TX	32.55°N 95.83°W	22:08–22:11	1.51 mi (2.43 km)	75 yd (69 m)	This brief tornado caused damage to trees and barns along its path. A mobile home on FM 1255 was damaged, and a nearby outbuilding was destroyed with debris blown up to a quarter mile away. The tornado also crossed I-20 before lifting, and surveys confirmed it followed a separate track from the larger EF3 tornado that struck the area later. The path of this tornado was moved significantly eastward in July 2025 to match radar data and high-resolution satellite imagery.
EF0	Western Canton	Van Zandt	TX	32.54°N 95.88°W	23:02–23:04	0.98 mi (1.58 km)	50 yd (46 m)	A brief tornado touched down along SH 198 just west of Canton as the nearby EF4 tornado was dissipating. It moved north-northwest across SH 243 before lifting, blowing down several trees along its path. An outbuilding was also heavily damaged. This tornado was officially documented in August 2025. The path of this tornado was determined using radar data and high-resolution satellite imagery.
EF0	W of Miller Grove	Hopkins	TX	32.9906°N 95.836°W	23:32–23:50	8.57 mi (13.79 km)	100 yd (91 m)	A multiple-vortex tornado destroyed a metal barn and damaged a house after a tree limb fell on the main power line and caused the structure to catch fire.
EF0	N of Pauline to SSW of Phalba	Van Zandt	TX	32.36°N 96.05°W	00:13–00:21	3.04 mi (4.89 km)	100 yd (91 m)	A tornado in southwest Van Zandt County tracked through open fields, causing tree and ranch land damage. It began near the county line, moved east-northeast through rural areas, and lifted north of Purtis Creek State Park. This tornado path was updated significantly in August 2025 to match radar data and the damage path on high-resolution satellite imagery.
EF1	NNW of Lindale	Smith	TX	32.5656°N 95.4619°W	00:45–00:48	2.99 mi (4.81 km)	570 yd (520 m)	A barn had its roof ripped off and deposited back atop the structure, causing extensive damage. Trees were snapped and uprooted.

== Aftermath ==
At the time, the East Texas tornadoes ranked among the top five most prolific tornado outbreaks in Texas, producing 8 tornadoes. This number placed the event only behind April 26, 2015 (16 tornadoes), April 19, 1995 & April 3, 2012 (17 tornadoes), and April 26, 1994 (26 tornadoes). The Eustace–West Canton EF4 tornado was the strongest to strike Van Zandt County since 1950, with two unofficial F4 tornadoes (Note: In the United States, tornado records prior to the year 1950 are considered unofficial.) preceding it on April 9, 1919, and May 25, 1907, the first of which also struck Canton, causing at least 7 fatalities in Canton and 17 overall. The Eustace–West Canton EF4 tornado was also the first violent tornado in Texas since the December 26, 2015 Garland tornado, and remained the strongest tornado to strike Texas until November 4, 2022, when two EF4 tornadoes moved through areas in and around Caviness and Clarksville respectively.

=== Damage & recovery efforts ===
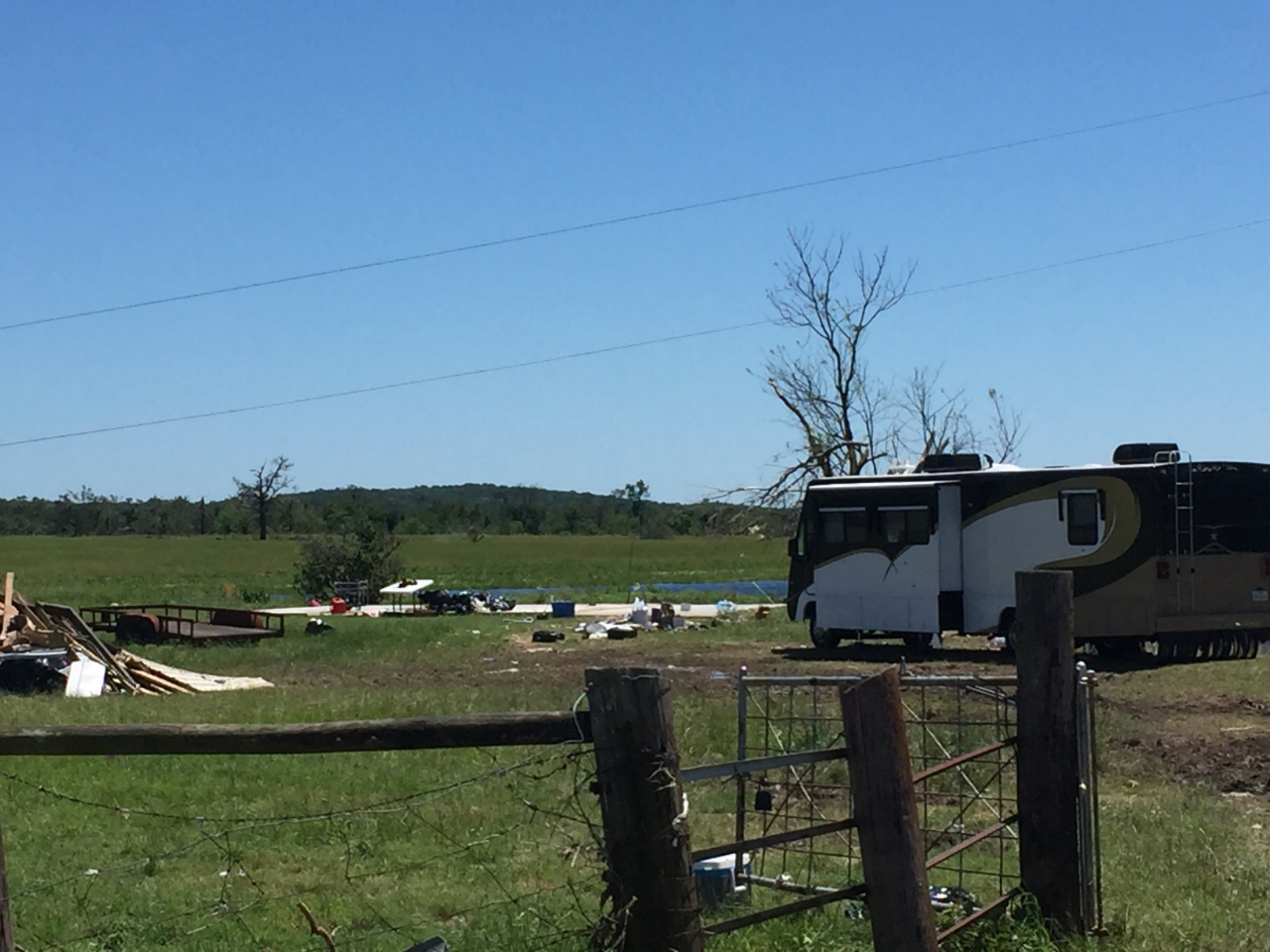
A manufactured home on Pollard Lake southwest of Canton destroyed by the Eustace--West Canton tornado at EF2 strength.

The tornadoes caused over $1,000,000 (2017 USD) in damages, with over 5,000 structures being damaged in the East Texas storms. The Eustace–West Canton EF4 tornado alone damaged or destroyed over 50 structures, and “several” were damaged by the East Canton–Emory EF3 tornado. The total scope of destruction was 35 miles long and 15 miles wide, with the mayor of Canton describing the damage as "heartbreaking and upsetting". By the morning of Monday, May 1, Van Zandt County had signed a disaster declaration, and numerous first responders, some from up to 100 miles away, arrived at the affected areas. By Wednesday, May 3, 800 people were still left without power following the storm, with 313 of those in Van Zandt County alone.

=== Casualties ===
Four people were killed (revised down from an initial report of five), two each from the Eustace–West Canton EF4 tornado and East Canton–Emory EF3 tornado. A further 49 injuries were confirmed, 25 from the Eustace–West Canton EF4 tornado and the other 24 from the East Canton–Emory EF3 tornado (although the East Texas Medical Center (ETMC) claimed 56 were treated at hospitals in the area, two in critical condition). While the Log Cabin EF2 tornado did not have any definitive injury count, the National Weather Service did document "multiple" significant injuries. The high amount of injuries may have been in part to the fact that some of the tornadoes that struck East Texas that day were heavily rain-wrapped, and many people lost power prior to the tornadoes, rendering them unaware of their approach.

List of fatalities from the East Texas tornadoes
Name	Age	Location of death	Area	County	Tornado	Refs.
Russell "Rusty" Barlow	51	Building	Canton	Van Zandt	Eustace–West Canton EF4	
Kenneth Hughes	57	Residence	Canton	Van Zandt	Eustace–West Canton EF4	
Lucretia Evette Sykes	49	Vehicle	Canton	Van Zandt	East Canton–Emory EF3	
James Clayton Young	39	Vehicle	Canton	Van Zandt	East Canton–Emory EF3	

=== 2025 reanalysis ===
From the months of July to August 2025, National Weather Service surveyors reassessed the paths of the East Texas tornadoes using radar imagery and high-resolution Google Earth aerial imagery taken on May 5, 2017, six days after the tornadoes struck. In July 2025, the path of the EF4 tornado was adjusted from 21 miles to 23 miles, along with both the EF2 tornado, its path significantly shortened to six miles from a former 11 miles, and the EF3 tornado, its path slightly lengthened from 40 miles to 44 miles. In August 2025, numerous new damage indicators were added to the tornadoes on the Damage Assessment Toolkit (DAT). Also during this period, a new EF0 tornado tracking through the western side of Canton was discovered and added to the DAT, bringing the total number of tornadoes associated with the event to eight from its previous seven.

== See also ==
- List of Texas tornadoes
- Tornadoes of 2017
- Weather of 2017
- List of F4, EF4, and IF4 tornadoes
  - List of F4 and EF4 tornadoes (2010–2019)
- 2017 Perryville tornado – Another deadly EF4 tornado in Missouri and Illinois which happened two months earlier
- Tornado outbreak sequence of May 5–10, 2015 – A tornado outbreak sequence that produced significant tornadoes in the same areas just under two years earlier
