= Tornado outbreak and floods of April 28 – May 1, 2017 =

2017 severe weather in central US

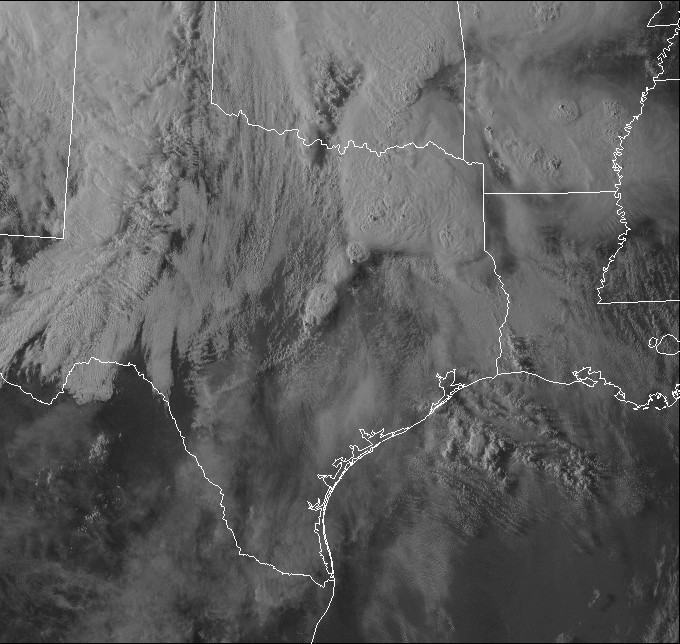
- Satellite image of storm system and associated supercells over the state of Texas at 23:30 UTC on April 29

Meteorological history
- Duration: April 28–May 1, 2017

Tornado outbreak
- Tornadoes: 77 confirmed
- Max. rating: EF4 tornado
- Duration: 3 days, 19 hours, 9 minutes
- Highest winds: Tornadic – 180 mph (290 km/h) near (Canton, Texas EF4 on April 29)
- Highest gusts: Non-tornadic – 85 mph (137 km/h) near Williamsport, Pennsylvania
- Largest hail: 2.75 inches (7.0 cm) in Pocola, Oklahoma

Extratropical cyclone
- Lowest pressure: 991 hPa (mbar); 29.26 inHg
- Max. rainfall: 19 in (48 cm) near West Plains, Missouri
- Max. snowfall: Snow – 39 in (99 cm) near San Isabel, Colorado

Overall effects
- Fatalities: 5 (+15 non-tornadic)
- Injuries: 70 injuries
- Damage: $1.9 billion (2017 USD)
- Areas affected: High Plains, Western United States (Rocky Mountains), Ohio Valley, Upper Midwest, Southeastern United States
- Power outages: 61,200
- Part of the tornado outbreaks of 2017, the 2016–17 North American winter and Floods in the United States in 2017

Between April 28 – May 1, 2017, a series of severe weather events affected the Central United States, producing life-threatening flooding and a major tornado outbreak. It formed out of a disturbance in the Southwestern United States on April 28, and caused significant impacts, including a heavy snowstorm in the Rockies, and other types of severe weather. Up to 3 feet (36 in) of snow fell on the cold side of the system, and up to a foot of rain fell in and around the central parts of the nation.

Numerous tornadoes ripped through the central United States as a powerful storm system developed in the Rockies. Mainly EF0 and EF1 tornadoes were seen on April 28. Tornadoes made multiple appearances in Louisiana, Texas, and Arkansas on this day. Massive swaths of large hail up to two inches (5.1 cm) in diameter and wind speeds up to 81 mph (135 km/h) were also reported on April 28. On April 29, two long-lived and particularly dangerous tornadoes ripped through the Canton, Texas area, killing four people and injuring many others. One tornado was rated EF3 and the other was rated EF4 on the Enhanced Fujita Scale. April 30 saw a total of 41 tornadoes touch down in Arkansas, Missouri, Louisiana, Mississippi, Tennessee, and Alabama. An EF2 tornado killed one person and caused considerable damage in the town of Durant, Mississippi.

Tornadoes were not the only threat with this storm complex as a large number of Flash Flood Watches went up in areas the storms were impacting. Isolated rainfall totals up to eleven inches were seen in far south Indiana and parts of Missouri. The heavy rainfall combined with the strong winds from the severe thunderstorms allowed for trees to be brought down easily in locations that received excessive rainfall. Streets were reported to be impassable and some roads were even closed due to the heavy rains. A few generally weak tornadoes were scattered around on May 1. Tornadoes were not the primary threat on May 1; however straight line winds in excess of 85 mph (137 km/h) were reported throughout the eastern seaboard of the United States. Overall, this outbreak produced 77 tornadoes and 20 deaths. Only five of the deaths were a direct result of tornadoes, while other deaths occurred from the flooding and heavy snow the storm system brought as well.

== Meteorological synopsis ==
=== April 28–29 ===
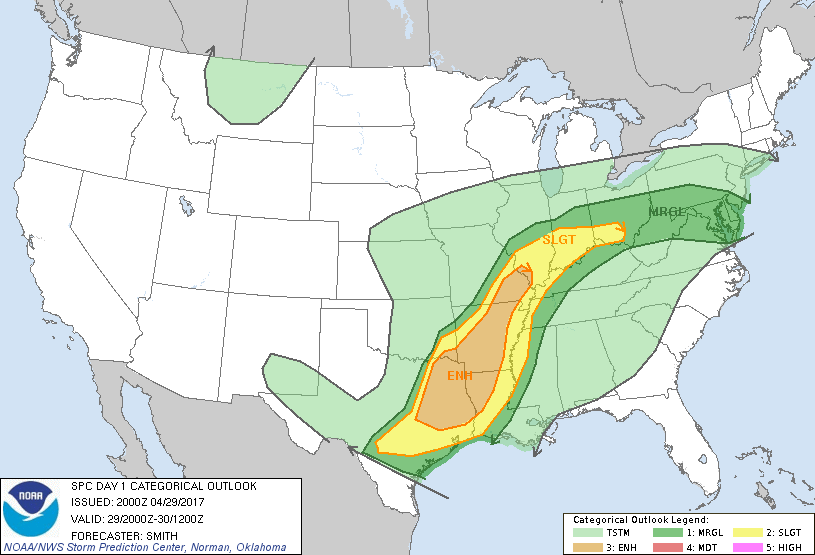
The Storm Prediction Center's Day 1 2000 UTC outlook for April 29, denoting an enhanced risk from Eastern Texas continuing into southwestern Illinois.

On April 26, 2017, the Storm Prediction Center (SPC) outlined a 30% risk for severe weather over northeastern Texas, southeastern Oklahoma, southwestern Arkansas, and northwestern Louisiana, encompassed by a larger 15% risk area. A shortwave trough was expected to amplify over the southern Rocky Mountains and move eastwards through the southern Great Plains, accompanied by a strong cold front. Severe thunderstorms were expected to develop along the boundary, moving eastwards through Texas and into the lower Mississippi Valley, where the atmosphere would be "moderately to strongly unstable". The following day, April 27, at 07:22 UTC, the SPC outlined an enhanced (3 out of 5) categorical risk, or 30% probabilistic risk, over the previous area of the 15% and 30% risks.

On April 28, at 17:41 UTC, the SPC extended their enhanced risk to stretch into southern Missouri, now accompanied by a smaller 45% probabilistic risk for severe weather in Texas, Oklahoma, Arkansas, and Louisiana. Severe thunderstorms were expected to form and pose threats of large hail, damaging winds, and tornadoes. Weather vapor imagery denoted an amplifying mid-level trough situated over the western United States, as a ridge built over the Southeast coast. A mid-level low would develop and move eastwards from the Four Corners into the Texas Panhandle and western Oklahoma. In the lower levels, a surface low initially situated over the southern Plains would slowly move northeast into the Ozarks, while a stationary frontal zone sat east-northeast from central Oklahoma through Missouri and into the Ohio Valley. An arctic cold front moved southwards into the Permian Basin, and a Pacific cold front combined and accelerated southeastwards across Texas and into the lower Sabine Valley by Sunday, April 30. Strong low-level southerly flow would advect a maritime tropical airmass, consisting of lowest 100-mb mean mixing ratios (at or above 16 g/kg) and translating to 70-74 degree F surface dewpoints, into much of the warm sector across Arkansas, Louisiana, Texas, and northeastwards into northern portions of the lower Mississippi Valley. Ongoing thunderstorms were likely across portions of Oklahoma near the terminus of a 60-kt low level jet as the cold front encroached on the warm sector. Isolated severe hail and severe gusts were possible with the initial activity. An elevated mixed layer and capping inversion allowed a very unstable boundary layer (MLCAPE 2500-4000 J/kg) to develop to the south of convective outflow and cloud debris across southeast Oklahoma & Arkansas and into east-central Texas. Weather models indicated storm development moving southwestwards into north-central Texas during the afternoon of April 29 in association with a couple of storm clusters. The more substantial severe risk was to be timed with the ejection of a strong mid-level vorticity maximum moving eastwards into the southern Plains during the late afternoon and through the overnight. More uncertain was the potential development of quasi-discrete storms developing ahead of the front. Any supercells that managed to develop and sustain themselves in the moisture-rich environment with a sizable hodograph were probable to pose a tornadic threat. As the mid-level wave turned into the region, strengthening effective shear profiles from 30-kt to 45-60 kt produced favorable conditions for a mature squall line moving eastward across this region and moving into Arkansas and Louisiana. The threat for severe gusts and associated wind damage were expected to become more widespread in Arkansas, Louisiana, and Texas after nightfall.

On April 29, at the 06:00 UTC outlook, the SPC continued their enhanced risk, alongside a 5% risk for tornadoes, lasting through the 1300, 1630, and 2000 UTC outlooks. Strong winds associated with the aforementioned upper low would translate across west Texas and the southern Plains that night, alongside by 150–180 m height falls at 500 mb. At lower levels in advance of the upper low, a broad low-level jet was placed over parts of Texas, Oklahoma, Louisiana, and Arkansas, with 50-60 kt winds in the 1–2 km agl level. This would provide strong low-level shear on April 29, with strengthening deep-layer shear progressing eastward across the southern plains towards the lower Mississippi Valley that night. A ridge of high pressure centered over the Atlantic Ocean, allowing high levels of atmospheric pressure originating from the Gulf of Mexico to focus along the front. This caused thunderstorm training (clusters of heavy rain and thunderstorms slowly progressing eastwards). For the next six hours, the front remained mostly indifferent as it moved slightly eastwards, although a squall line was beginning to form, increasing the threat for large hail, damaging wind gusts and a few tornadoes. Although the overall setup that day was not favorable for a widespread tornado outbreak, thunderstorms from earlier in the day left behind an outflow boundary across northeastern Texas, resulting in a localized area of enhanced low-level helicity. Deep moisture, high levels of CAPE, and low LCL heights were also present in the area as multiple thunderstorms rode the boundary and dramatically intensified into large tornadic supercells, going on to produce the East Texas tornadoes.

=== April 30–May 1 ===
Overnight into the early hours of April 30, the activity pushed eastward and a powerful squall line of severe thunderstorms with numerous embedded tornadic circulations swept through the Mississippi Valley. Throughout the day, the low tracked northeast into the Plains and intensified, causing some snowfall in the mountainous regions and in colder places, meanwhile severe weather continued to occur in the South. Forty-two tornadoes occurred across the Southern United States that afternoon and evening, with much of the activity centered in Mississippi. While many of these tornadoes were weak, some were large and wedge-shaped and reached EF2 intensity. One of these strong tornadoes killed one person and caused damage in the town of Durant, Mississippi. On May 1, another squall line of severe storms developed further to the north. The Storm Prediction Center ended up issuing a tornado watch for parts of Pennsylvania and New York. The storms ended up producing multiple embedded weak tornadoes across the region. Tornadoes were not the primary threat; however, and straight line wind gusts up to 85 mph (137 km/h) were reported in parts of Pennsylvania and New York which caused a significant amount of damage in the impacted areas. Numerous reports of downed trees and power lines were received throughout parts of the Northeastern United States before the event came to an end.

== Confirmed tornadoes ==
Confirmed tornadoes by Enhanced Fujita rating
EFU	EF0	EF1	EF2	EF3	EF4	EF5	Total
0	25	42	8	1	1	0	77

=== Canton/Eastern Texas tornadoes ===
Canton/East Texas tornadoes
Meteorological history
- Formed: April 29, 2017, 5:29 p.m. CDT (UTC−06:00)
- Dissipated: April 29, 2017, 11:48 p.m. CDT (UTC−06:00)

Tornadoes
- Tornadoes: 8 (Note: This count consists of only the tornadoes that struck Canton on April 29, and does not represent the number of tornadoes produced during the entire outbreak sequence.)
- Max. rating: EF4 tornado
- Duration: 3 hours, 15 minutes
- Highest winds: 180 mph (290 km/h) (Eustace–Canton, Texas EF4)

Overall effects
- Fatalities: 4
- Injuries: >49
- Damage: >$1 million (2017 USD)
- Areas affected: Eastern Texas, namely Henderson, Van Zandt, Rains, and Hopkins County.

On April 29, multiple tornadoes, some large, destructive, and deadly, moved through the East Texas counties of Henderson, Van Zandt, Rains, and Hopkins. Over the course of 3 hours and 15 minutes, the tornadoes killed four people, injured over 49, and wrought severe damage across the area. The strongest of the tornadoes were given mid-range EF4, low-end EF3, and mid-range EF2 ratings respectively by the National Weather Service (NWS) in Fort Worth/Dallas, Texas. The strongest, a large, violent EF4 rain wrapped tornado first began in Henderson County. The tornado tracked north/northeastwards, reaching EF2 strength southeast of Eustace before weakening as it entered Van Zandt County. The tornado intensified back to EF2 strength shortly after, damaging or destroying multiple structures as it moved north-northeastwards towards the Canton area. Passing between Phalba and Tundra, the tornado rapidly intensified to EF4 strength, destroying a well-built two story brick home. Weakening to EF3 strength, the tornado began to turn towards the northwest, striking the community of Jackson. The tornado damaged or destroyed numerous structures southwest of Canton before rapidly weakening and dissipating near High, leaving two people dead and 25 more injured.

As the EF4 tornado was ongoing, another supercell produced a separate tornado in Henderson County. The tornado, moving northeastwards, first reached EF1 strength near Stockard. As it moved to the east of Eustace, the tornado intensified to EF2 strength and blew a house off of its foundation. The tornado then gradually weakened, causing tree damage before dissipating south of Big Rock, with multiple injuries attributed to the tornado. The same supercell then quickly cycled and produced another tornado on the Henderson-Van Zandt county border. The tornado moved north-northeastwards, reaching EF1 strength east of Denman Crossroads. Passing to the east of Tundra, the tornado strengthened further to EF2 strength, destroying multiple structures as it continued into the eastern side of Canton. There, many buildings, including a dealership, were damaged or destroyed as the tornado intensified to EF3 strength, and one woman was killed when her vehicle was thrown from the road. Exiting Canton, the tornado weakened back to EF2 strength, causing widespread tree damage. The tornado then turned northeast into Fruitvale, where multiple structures were damaged or destroyed before the tornado exited town and weakened to EF0 strength, turning north-northeastwards into Rains County. The tornado then intensified back to EF1 strength, causing tree damage and isolated damage to structures. The tornado briefly reached EF2 strength southeast of Emory, severely damaging multiple structures before weakening back to EF0 strength. The tornado turned almost due northwards and crossed the Lake Fork Reservoir before dissipating east of Dougherty, leaving two people dead and 24 others injured. Three more weak tornadoes touched down, two EF0 tornadoes in Van Zandt County and an EF1 tornado in Hopkins County.

== Non-tornadic impacts ==
=== Flooding impacts ===
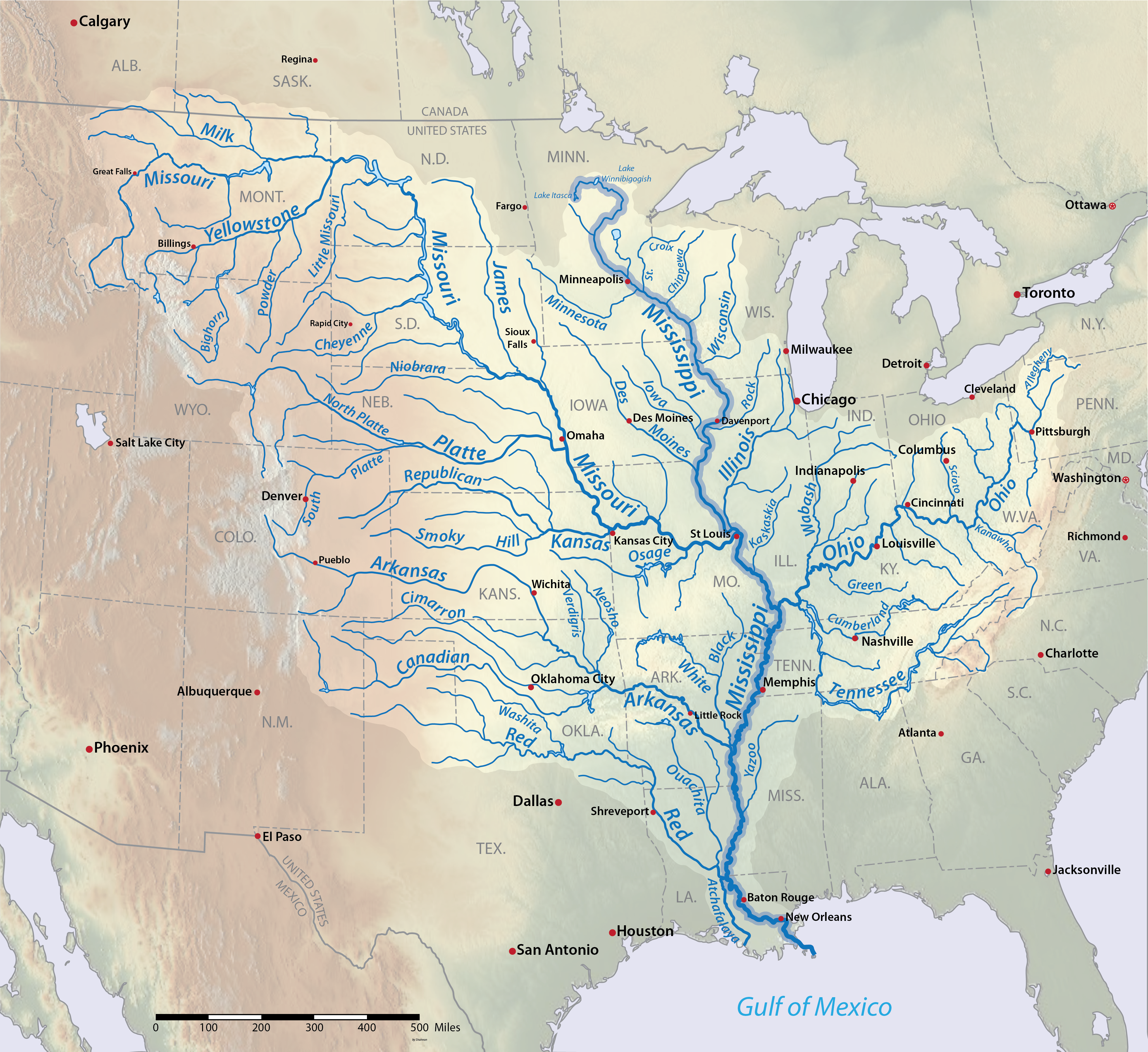
Flooding occurred in the Lower Mississippi River Basin.

According to the NWS, multiple reports of flash flooding had impacted several states, in a range extending from Oklahoma to Missouri.

Late on April 28, a flood watch was issued for a large portion of the Central United States as high moisture clashing with the stationary front was expected to create life-threatening floods, potentially being caused by thunderstorm training. Rainfall totals of up to 11.05 inches (28.1 cm) caused significant damage to property and crops. A large amount of farmland was rendered unusable due to the catastrophic flooding. Farmers had also made plans to plant crops, however, those plans had to be cancelled due to their farmland being flooded.

The flooding has also caused sewage and chemical waste to mix with the rainwater, causing fears of poisoning. Sandbagging efforts have been full-fledged as the Mississippi River continued to rise.

In addition, multiple water rescues were being carried out in places that had been deluged with heavy rainfall overnight, some areas picking up to 6 inches (15 cm) in only 12 hours. In total, some locations were able to pick up almost 1 foot (30 cm) of rainfall during the ordeal. Rainfall rates of 1 to 2 inches (2.5 to 5.1 cm) per hour caused flash flooding to occur in a lot of areas. Storm drains were not able to handle the large amounts of rain so a lot of these sewers ended up backing up onto the streets. Many vehicles that attempted to drive through flooded streets were swept away and/or stranded by the floods. Rivers reached moderate to major flood stages in a lot of locations which caused general street closures and severe overflow of rivers. In addition, certain levees were overwhelmed by the large amounts of rain.

==== Oklahoma ====
On April 29, in Oklahoma, the Oklahoma City Fire Department advised residents to stay home due to downed trees and power lines. In addition, multiple portions of interstates, including I-235, I-44, and I-40 had to be shut down because of downed power lines and flooding. Lightning ignited a home fire according to news outlets, while a second was reported to have possibly triggered another. As much as 39,000 were reported to have been without power by early on April 29.

==== Missouri ====
Parts of I-44 in Missouri were closed after the interstate began to flood. Route 141 was closed at I-44 well into the week of May 7–13 due to the floodwaters overtopping the low-lying intersection. This was the second occurrence of this thoroughfare's extended closure since December 2015.

Seven levees on the Missouri River were overtopped by water, while another seven levees have been breached altogether. Officials in Missouri continue to warn about potentially contaminated floodwater and advised residents to avoid the water at all costs. The governor of Missouri was forced to declare a state of emergency for all of southern Missouri after the floods began to damage property. Officials estimate that some 200 homes have been affected by the floods near St. Louis and that another 1500 homes could be at risk by the floodwaters. Due to flooding at Busch Stadium, a game between the Saint Louis Cardinals and Cincinnati Reds was postponed.

==== Arkansas ====
Officials in Arkansas estimate that close to 1 million acres of farmland have been affected in the state. The University of Arkansas stated that damage totals could be near $64.5 million US dollars. Close to 50 homes have been damaged in Randolph County in Arkansas while 76 residents had to be evacuated due to floodwaters threatening a nursing home. A levee failure in Pocahontas allowed for water to spill into a small town; threatening about 6,500 residents. A total of 108 National Guard members have been deployed in the state for relief. The governor of Arkansas also stated that close to 500 evacuations had already been carried out and that they have 25 vehicles prepared in the case that more evacuations needed to occur.

==== Louisiana ====
In Louisiana, a school bus was stranded after attempting to cross a flooded roadway. The Mississippi River reached a top five crest at 12 feet (3.7 m) above flood stage.

=== Snow impacts ===
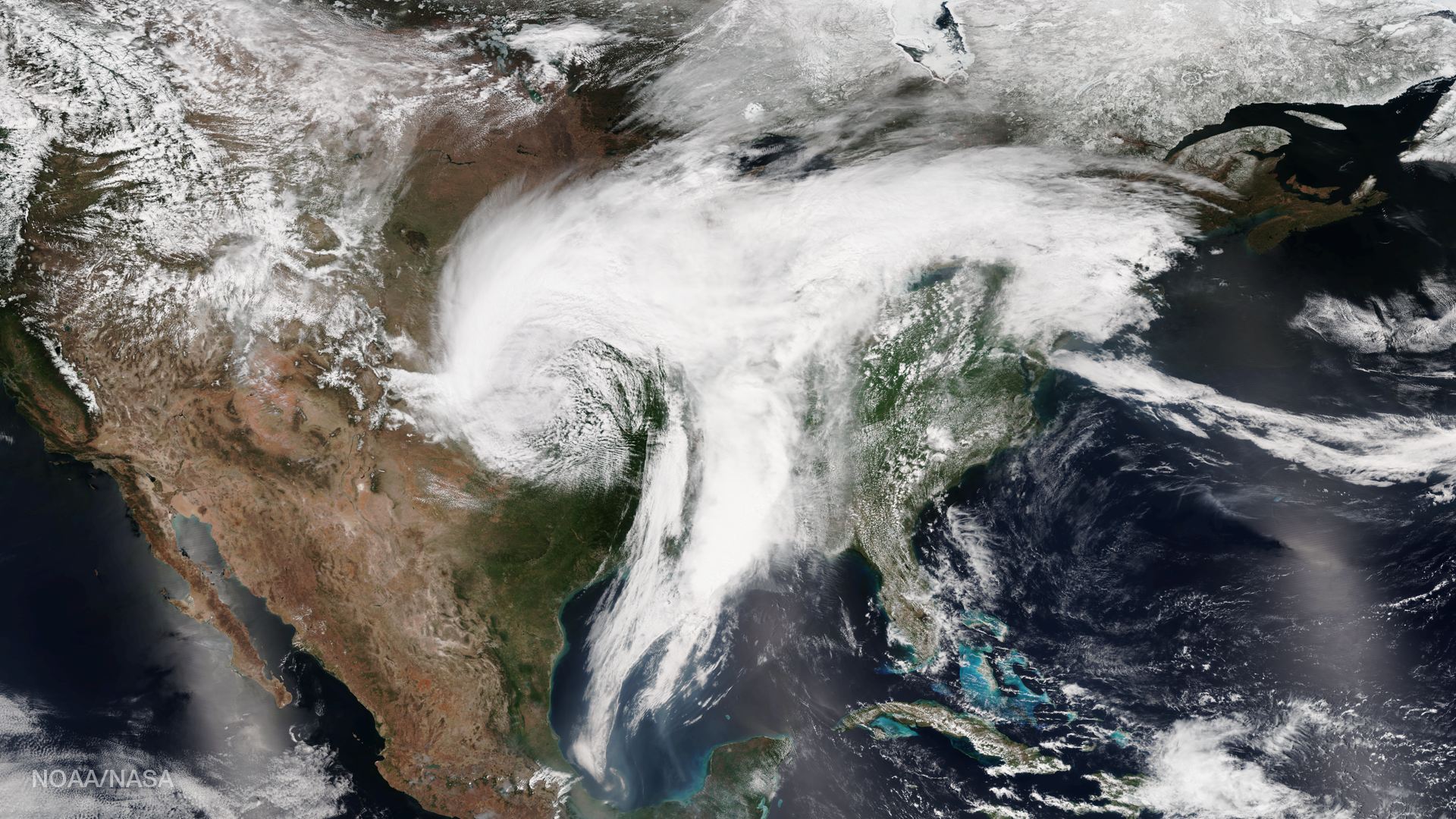
The storm complex over the Central United States on April 30

The same weather system produced heavy snow affected parts of Colorado, Wyoming, Kansas, and Missouri.

On April 28, residents in Denver, Colorado and other major cities began preparing for the storm. Officials were also worried that because of the time of year where most trees were in full bloom, the heavy wet snow might cause branches to break and fall down, possibly causing power outages. In Boulder, where a golf tournament was being held, officials were prepared for possible delays to the tournament. In the end, Denver picked up 5 inches (13 cm), with higher amounts in the mountains. At the height of the storm, up to 9,200 were reported to be without power in Pueblo.

Previously, the winter storm had dumped up to 2 feet (24 in) of snow in the higher elevations of Wyoming. The state's Department of Transportation also urged residents to stay off the roadways if necessary. In addition, US 16 was shut down in the Bighorn Mountains because of the treacherous conditions.

Blizzard warnings were issued for Kansas and the adjacent areas, as heavy snow and gusty winds were predicted. After the storm subsided, about 100 evacuations and 36 rescues were reported. In the northwestern part of the state, 130 miles (210 km) of I-70 was shut down due to the treacherous conditions.

== Aftermath ==
=== Damage & recovery efforts ===
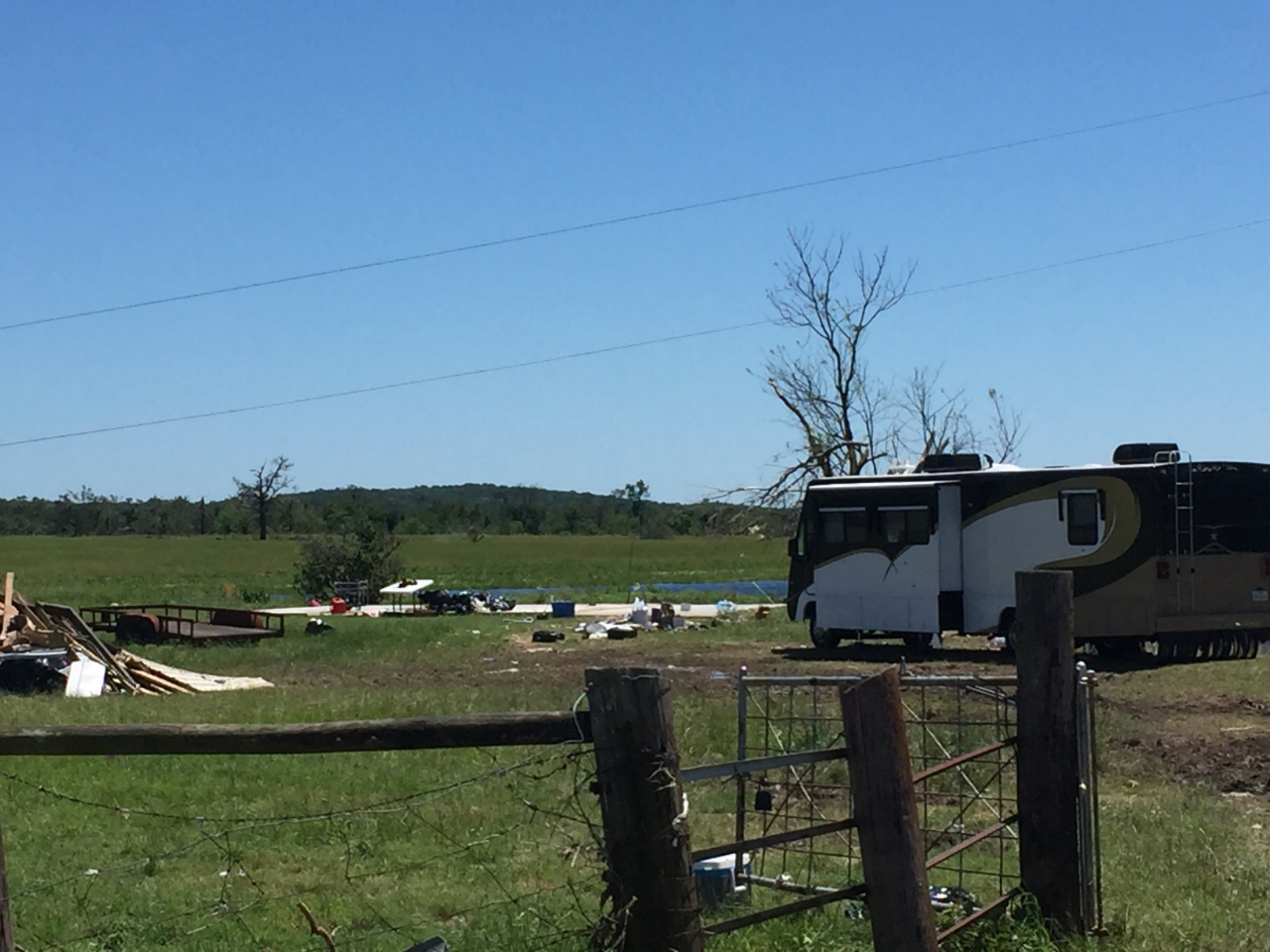
A manufactured home on Pollard Lake southwest of Canton destroyed by the Eustace--West Canton tornado at EF2 strength.

The tornadoes caused over $1,000,000 (2017 USD) in damages, with over 5,000 structures being damaged in the East Texas storms. The Eustace–West Canton EF4 tornado alone damaged or destroyed over 50 structures, and "several" were damaged by the East Canton–Emory EF3 tornado. The total scope of destruction was 35 miles long and 15 miles wide, with the mayor of Canton describing the damage as "heartbreaking and upsetting". By the morning of Monday, May 1, Van Zandt County had signed a disaster declaration, and numerous first responders, some from up to 100 miles away, arrived at the affected areas. By Wednesday, May 3, 800 people were still left without power following the storm, with 313 of those in Van Zandt County alone.

== See also ==
- December 2015 North American storm complex
- Tornado outbreak and floods of April 27–30, 2014
- Tornadoes of 2017
- Floods in the United States: 2001–present
