= Montgomery School District =

Montgomery School District may refer to:

- Montgomery School District (Sonoma County, California), a district in Sonoma County, California
- Montgomery Area School District, Pennsylvania
- Montgomery Independent School District, Texas
- Montgomery County School District, which merged into the Winona-Montgomery Consolidated School District, Mississippi
