= Robert Howell =

Robert Howell may refer to:

- Robert B. Howell (1864–1933), U.S. senator from Nebraska
- Robert Howell (cricketer) (1877–1942), English cricketer
- Rob Howell, British costume and set designer

== See also ==
- Bobby Howell (born 1941), member of the Mississippi House of Representatives
