= Dougherty, Texas =

Dougherty, Texas may refer to:

- Dougherty, Floyd County, Texas
- Dougherty, Rains County, Texas
