= Fruitvale Independent School District =

School district in Texas

Coordinates: 32.6854°N 95.8029°W

Address
- 244 VZ County Road 1910 Fruitvale, Texas, 75127; United States

District information
- Type: Public
- Established: 1964; 61 years ago
- Superintendent: Rebecca Bain

Students and staff
- Athletic conference: UIL Class 2A
- District mascot: Bobcats
- Colors: Blue, Black, and White

Other information
- Website: www.fruitvaleisd.com

Fruitvale Independent School District is a 2A independent school district based in Fruitvale, Texas (USA).

There are three campuses at Fruitvale ISD -

- Fruitvale High School (Grades 9-12)
- Fruitvale Junior High School (Grades 6-8)
- Hallie Randall Elementary (Grades PK-5)

== Academic achievement ==
For the 2022–23 school year, the district was rated by the Texas Education Agency as follows: 79 (C) overall, 78 (C) for Student Achievement, 78 (C) for School Progress, and 80 (B) for Closing the Gaps.

== Special programs ==
Fruitvale High School plays Six-man football

== See also ==
- List of school districts in Texas
