= Kilmichael, Mississippi =

- Town
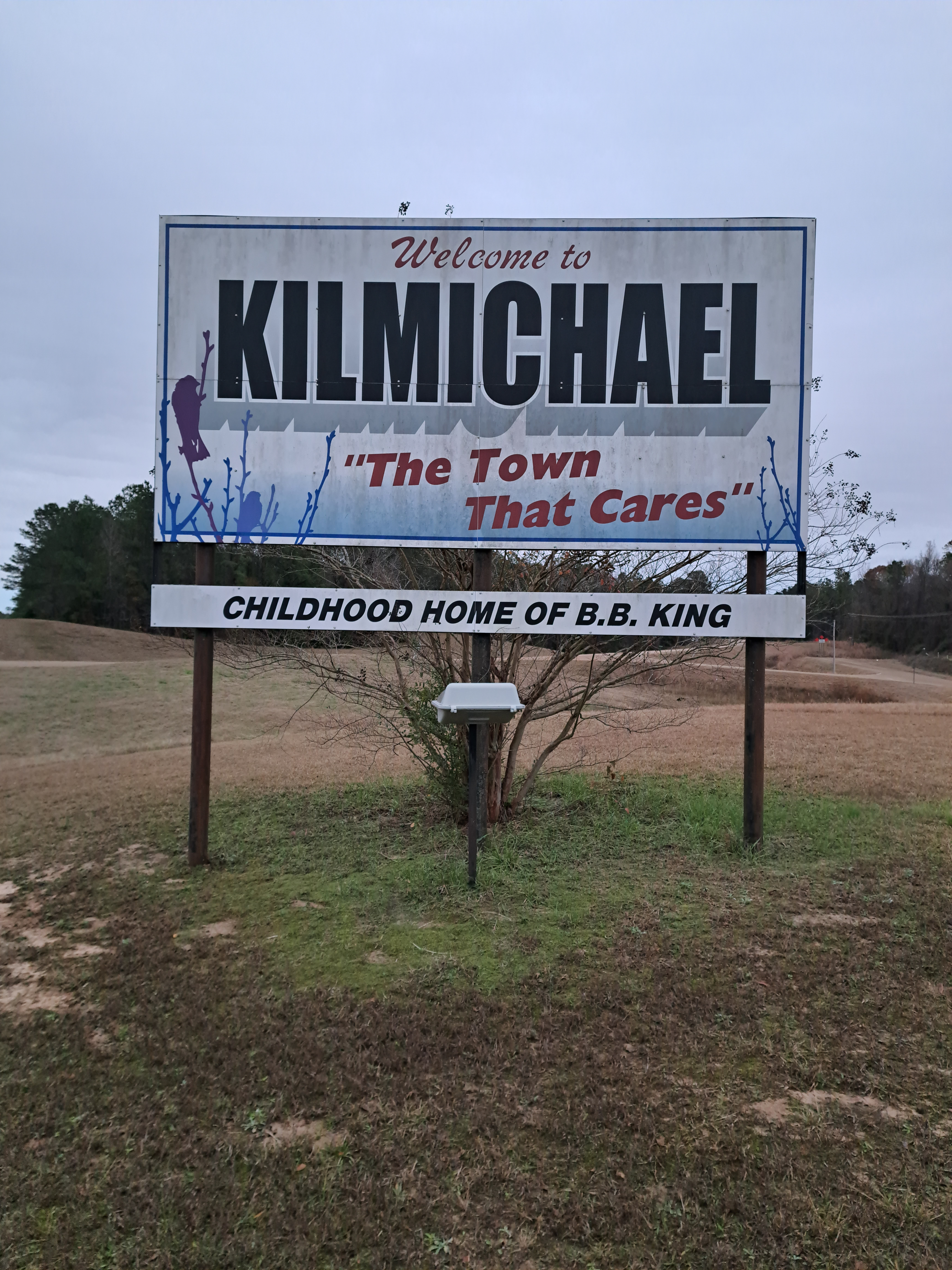
- Sign for Kilmichael, Mississippi

- Flag
- Motto: "The Town That Cares"
- Location in Montgomery County and the state of Mississippi

- Location in the United States
- Coordinates: 33°26′32″N 89°34′11″W
- Country: United States
- State: Mississippi
- County: Montgomery

Area
  - Total: 2.94 sq mi (7.62 km^{2})
  - Land: 2.94 sq mi (7.61 km^{2})
  - Water: 0.0039 sq mi (0.01 km^{2})
- Elevation: 360 ft (110 m)

Population (2020)
  - Total: 639
  - Density: 217.5/sq mi (83.96/km^{2})
- Time zone: UTC-6 (Central (CST))
  - Summer (DST): UTC-5 (CDT)
- ZIP code: 39747
- Area code: 662
- FIPS code: 28-37560
- GNIS feature ID: 0672122

Kilmichael is a town in Montgomery County, Mississippi, United States. Per the 2020 census, the population was 639.

== History ==
The population in 1900 was 227. The Bank of Kilmichael was established in 1904.

In 2001, the all-white board of aldermen cancelled town elections after citing a need for more time to implement election changes. Allegedly, the elections were delayed in order to avoid electing black politicians. The Justice Department intervened under the Voting Rights Act and forced a special election, in which Kilmichael elected its first black mayor and three black aldermen.

== Geography ==
Kilmichael is in east-central Montgomery County. U.S. Route 82 runs through the northeast part of the town on a four-lane bypass. The highway leads west 10 miles (16 km) to Winona, the county seat, and east 20 miles (32 km) to Eupora. Mississippi Highway 413 leads southeast from Kilmichael 16 miles (26 km) to French Camp.

According to the U.S. Census Bureau, the town has a total area of 2.9 square miles (7.5 km^{2}), of which 0.004 square miles (0.010 km^{2}), or 0.14%, are water. The Big Black River, a tributary of the Mississippi, passes just south of the town limits.

== Demographics ==
Historical population
Census	Pop.	Note	%±
1900	227		—
1910	380		67.4%
1920	395		3.9%
1930	577		46.1%
1940	556		−3.6%
1950	511		−8.1%
1960	532		4.1%
1970	543		2.1%
1980	906		66.9%
1990	826		−8.8%
2000	830		0.5%
2010	699		−15.8%
2020	639		−8.6%
U.S. Decennial Census; 2010 2020

=== Racial and ethnic composition ===
Kilmichael town, Mississippi – Racial and ethnic composition Note: the US Census treats Hispanic/Latino as an ethnic category. This table excludes Latinos from the racial categories and assigns them to a separate category. Hispanics/Latinos may be of any race.
Race / Ethnicity (NH = Non-Hispanic)	Pop 2000	Pop 2010	Pop 2020	% 2000	% 2010	% 2020
White alone (NH)	384	259	271	46.27%	37.05%	42.41%
Black or African American alone (NH)	435	429	341	52.41%	61.37%	53.36%
Native American or Alaska Native alone (NH)	2	4	0	0.24%	0.57%	0.00%
Asian alone (NH)	0	5	0	0.00%	0.72%	0.00%
Native Hawaiian or Pacific Islander alone (NH)	0	0	0	0.00%	0.00%	0.00%
Other race alone (NH)	0	0	0	0.00%	0.00%	0.00%
Mixed race or Multiracial (NH)	1	1	24	0.12%	0.14%	3.76%
Hispanic or Latino (any race)	8	1	3	0.96%	0.14%	0.47%
Total	830	699	639	100.00%	100.00%	100.00%

=== 2000 Census ===
As of the census of 2000, there were 830 people, 314 households, and 233 families residing in the town. The population density was 298.7 inhabitants per square mile (115.3/km^{2}). There were 367 housing units at an average density of 132.1 per square mile (51.0/km^{2}). The racial makeup of the town was 53.37% African American, 46.27% White, 0.24% Native American, and 0.12% from two or more races. Hispanic or Latino of any race were 0.96% of the population.

There were 314 households, out of which 30.6% had children under the age of 18 living with them, 46.5% were married couples living together, 23.9% had a female householder with no husband present, and 25.5% were non-families. 23.9% of all households were made up of individuals, and 13.7% had someone living alone who was 65 years of age or older. The average household size was 2.62 and the average family size was 3.09.

In the town, the population was spread out, with 26.6% under the age of 18, 8.7% from 18 to 24, 24.5% from 25 to 44, 23.0% from 45 to 64, and 17.2% who were 65 years of age or older. The median age was 37 years. For every 100 females, there were 80.0 males. For every 100 females age 18 and over, there were 73.0 males.

The median income for a household in the town was $24,712, and the median income for a family was $30,909. Males had a median income of $25,192 versus $18,281 for females. The per capita income for the town was $12,457. About 24.8% of families and 25.3% of the population were below the poverty line, including 34.7% of those under age 18 and 28.4% of those age 65 or over.

== Education ==
Kilmichael is served by the Winona-Montgomery Consolidated School District. Two schools in Kilmichael (Montgomery County Elementary and Montgomery County High School) closed in 2018.

The town was previously served by the Montgomery County School District. Montgomery County Elementary School, formerly Kilmichael Elementary School, and Montgomery County High School were both located in Kilmichael. At one time Kilmichael Elementary had 1,000 students.

In 1989, Kilmichael High School and Duck Hill High School consolidated into one school. In 1990, the name was changed to Montgomery County High School. Circa 2001 Kilmichael Elementary had 366 students. In 2004, Kilmichael Elementary and Duck Hill Elementary consolidated to form Montgomery County Elementary School. Effective July 1, 2018, the Montgomery County and Winona Separate School District consolidated into the Winona-Montgomery district. The initial plan is to have one elementary and one high school in Winona, just 11 miles west of Kilmichael.

== Notable people ==
- Hackett Dyre, member of the Mississippi House of Representatives from 1916 to 1920 and member of the Mississippi Senate from 1936 to 1940
- Grace Hightower, philanthropist, singer, actress and socialite
- Bobby Howell, member of the Mississippi House of Representatives from 1992 to 2015
- B.B. King, blues guitarist; reared in Kilmichael.
