= Hackett Dyre =

American politician

Member of the Mississippi Senate from the 26th district
- In office January 1936 – January 1940

Member of the Mississippi House of Representatives from the Grenada and Montgomery counties district
- In office January 1916 – January 1920

Personal details
- Born: January 28, 1888 Kilmichael, Mississippi
- Died: July 1975 (aged 87)
- Party: Democrat

William Hackett Dyre (January 28, 1888 - July 1975) was a Democratic Mississippi state legislator in the early-to-mid 20th century.

== Biography ==
William Hackett Dyre was born on January 28, 1888, in Kilmichael, Montgomery County, Mississippi. He was the son of Henry Dyre and Julia (Threadgill) Dyre. Dyre attended the public schools of Montgomery County, Mississippi, and attended Kilmichael Hill School and Winona High School. He graduated with a B.A. from the University of Chicago. He became a minister. In November 1915, he was elected to represent Grenada and Montgomery counties in the Mississippi House of Representatives as a Democrat, and served from 1916 to 1920. He represented Mississippi's 26th senatorial district the Mississippi Senate from 1936 to 1940. He died in July 1975. He had last resided in Cleveland, Mississippi.
