= Bobby Howell =

American politician

Member of the Mississippi House of Representatives from the 46th district
- In office 1992–2015

Personal details
- Born: December 23, 1941 (age 84) Winona, Mississippi, United States
- Party: Republican
- Spouse: Charmayne Killebrew Howell
- Relations: Chelsea Howell, Camille Howell, Lily Howell, Elijah (Eli) Martin, Abigail (Abi) Martin (grandchildren)
- Children: Brian Howell, Haley Howell Martin
- Occupation: Pharmacist

Bobby Burton Howell is an American pharmacist and politician in Mississippi. A Republican, he is a member of the Mississippi House of Representatives from Kilmichael, Mississippi. Howell is a pharmacist, and former mayor of Kilmichael. He is also an alumnus of Delta State University and the University of Mississippi
