= Montgomery County School District =

Defunct school district in Mississippi, United States

The Montgomery County School District was a public school district with its headquarters in Winona, Mississippi.

It district served rural areas of Montgomery County, Mississippi (USA), including the towns of Duck Hill and Kilmichael. Small pieces of the Winona city limits extended into the district.

Prior to its closure, the district operated schools in Kilmichael—including Montgomery County Elementary School and Montgomery County High School—and maintained a longstanding policy allowing county residents to transfer to neighboring school systems until 2001.

Effective July 1, 2018, the Mississippi state government mandated the consolidation of The Montgomery County School District and Winona Separate School District and consolidated into the Winona-Montgomery Consolidated School District. The consolidation was mandated by the Mississippi state government.

== History ==
During the early 20th century, public education in Montgomery County transitioned from dozens of small, racially segregated rural schoolhouses to larger consolidated community schools, such as Alva Consolidated School, to address funding and transportation challenges.

At one time, the district allowed students residing within its boundaries to transfer to nearby school districts, including schools in Grenada, Winona, and French Camp, before ending that policy in 2001.

In 2014, the Mississippi Legislature passed legislation mandating the administrative consolidation of the Montgomery County School District and the Winona Municipal Separate School District, later codified under Mississippi Code § 37-7-104.4. In December 2017, the Montgomery County School District sought a restraining order to block the merger, citing a lack of immediate school board representation for county residents outside Winona city limits. The legal challenge was unsuccessful, and the district officially merged into the Winona-Montgomery Consolidated School District on July 1, 2018, resulting in the closure of the remaining schools in Kilmichael.

== Schools ==
At the time of closing:

- Montgomery County High School - Kilmichael - Formerly Kilmicheal High School
- Montgomery County Elementary School - Kilmichael - Formerly Kilmichael Elementary School
  - At one time Kilmichael Elementary had 1,000 students. In 2001 it had 366 students.

Previous schools:

- Big Black Consolidated High School - Kilmichael
- Duck Hill High School - Duck Hill
- Duck Hill Elementary School - Duck Hill - Formerly Duck Hill High School
  - Circa 2001 it had around 100 students. At that time school district officials were considering closing it and moving the students to Kilmichael Elementary. Duck Hill residents stated opposition to the closure proposals.

== Demographics ==
=== 2006-07 school year ===
There were a total of 458 students enrolled in the Montgomery County School District during the 2006-2007 school year. The gender makeup of the district was 48% female and 52% male. The racial makeup of the district was 90.17% African American, 8.52% White, 1.09% Hispanic, and 0.22% Asian. 76.7% of the district's students were eligible to receive free lunch.

=== Previous school years ===
| School Year | Enrollment | Gender Makeup | | Racial Makeup | | | | |
| School Year | Enrollment | Female | Male | Asian | African American | Hispanic | Native American | White |
|---|---|---|---|---|---|---|---|---|
| 2005-06 | 497 | 49% | 51% | 0.20% | 90.74% | 0.40% | 0.40% | 8.25% |
| 2004-05 | 514 | 49% | 51% | 0.19% | 87.94% | 0.78% | – | 11.09% |
| 2003-04 | 549 | 49% | 51% | – | 85.97% | 0.18% | – | 13.84% |
| 2002-03 | 592 | 47% | 53% | – | 84.97% | – | – | 15.03% |

== Accountability statistics ==
| | 2006-07 | 2005-06 | 2004-05 | 2003-04 | 2002-03 |
|---|---|---|---|---|---|
| District Accreditation Status | Accredited | Accredited | Accredited | Accredited | Accredited |
School Performance Classifications
| Level 5 (Superior Performing) Schools | 0 | 0 | 0 | 1 | 0 |
| Level 4 (Exemplary) Schools | 0 | 0 | 1 | 1 | 1 |
| Level 3 (Successful) Schools | 2 | 2 | 1 | 1 | 2 |
| Level 2 (Under Performing) Schools | 0 | 0 | 0 | 0 | 0 |
| Level 1 (Low Performing) Schools | 0 | 0 | 0 | 0 | 0 |
| Not Assigned | 0 | 0 | 0 | 0 | 0 |

== See also ==
- List of school districts in Mississippi
