= Fruitvale, Texas =

- City
- Location of Fruitvale, Texas
- Coordinates: 32°41′01″N 95°48′12″W
- Country: United States
- State: Texas
- County: Van Zandt

Government
  - Type: City Council

Area
  - Total: 1.91 sq mi (4.94 km^{2})
  - Land: 1.90 sq mi (4.91 km^{2})
  - Water: 0.012 sq mi (0.03 km^{2})
- Elevation: 469 ft (143 m)

Population (2020)
  - Total: 476
  - Density: 251/sq mi (96.9/km^{2})

Racial Composition (2019)
  - White: 80.7%
  - Hispanic: 7.6%
  - American Indian: 7.2%
  - Black: 3.1%
  - Other: 1.4%
- Time zone: UTC-6 (Central (CST))
  - Summer (DST): UTC-5 (CDT)
- ZIP code: 75127
- Area codes: 430, 903
- GNIS feature ID: 2410555
- Website: www.cityoffruitvaletx.org

Fruitvale is a small city in Van Zandt County, Texas, United States. The population was 408 at the 2010 census, and 476 as of 2020. The town draws its name from its location in the center of the historic fruit-growing district of the Sabine River valley in northeastern Van Zandt County. Its name was originally Bolen Switch, but it was changed around 1901 after a petition of local fruit growers, and a post office was established in 1903. On April 29, 2017, an EF-3 tornado struck the town at EF-2 intensity, causing major damage and several injuries. Fruitvale Independent School District serves the town for head start to 12th grade.

== Geography ==
Fruitvale lies along U.S. Highway 80 between Edgewood and Grand Saline.

According to the United States Census Bureau, the city has a total area of 1.9 square miles (4.9 km^{2}), all land.

== Demographics ==
Historical population
Census	Pop.	Note	%±
1970	206		—
1980	367		78.2%
1990	349		−4.9%
2000	418		19.8%
2010	408		−2.4%
2020	476		16.7%
U.S. Decennial Census; 2020 Census

=== 2020 census ===
As of the 2020 census, Fruitvale had a population of 476. The median age was 40.7 years. 24.4% of residents were under the age of 18 and 17.4% of residents were 65 years of age or older. For every 100 females there were 95.9 males, and for every 100 females age 18 and over there were 95.7 males age 18 and over.

0.0% of residents lived in urban areas, while 100.0% lived in rural areas.

There were 172 households in Fruitvale, of which 38.4% had children under the age of 18 living in them. Of all households, 47.7% were married-couple households, 14.0% were households with a male householder and no spouse or partner present, and 29.7% were households with a female householder and no spouse or partner present. About 22.1% of all households were made up of individuals and 11.0% had someone living alone who was 65 years of age or older.

There were 197 housing units, of which 12.7% were vacant. The homeowner vacancy rate was 3.3% and the rental vacancy rate was 11.3%.

Racial composition as of the 2020 census
Race	Number	Percent
White	425	89.3%
Black or African American	4	0.8%
American Indian and Alaska Native	6	1.3%
Asian	1	0.2%
Native Hawaiian and Other Pacific Islander	0	0.0%
Some other race	19	4.0%
Two or more races	21	4.4%
Hispanic or Latino (of any race)	47	9.9%

=== 2000 census ===
As of the census of 2000, there were 418 people, 157 households, and 116 families residing in the city. The population density was 218.4 inhabitants per square mile (84.3/km^{2}). There were 172 housing units at an average density of 89.9 per square mile (34.7/km^{2}). The racial makeup of the city was 92.82% White, 0.96% African American, 0.96% Native American, 0.24% Asian, 2.87% from other races, and 2.15% from two or more races. Hispanic or Latino of any race were 3.59% of the population.

There were 157 households, out of which 37.6% had children under the age of 18 living with them, 55.4% were married couples living together, 15.9% had a female householder with no husband present, and 25.5% were non-families. 23.6% of all households were made up of individuals, and 13.4% had someone living alone who was 65 years of age or older. The average household size was 2.62 and the average family size was 3.03.

In the city the population was spread out, with 29.4% under the age of 18, 8.4% from 18 to 24, 26.1% from 25 to 44, 20.3% from 45 to 64, and 15.8% who were 65 years of age or older. The median age was 35 years. For every 100 females, there were 92.6 males. For every 100 females age 18 and over, there were 86.7 males.

The median income for a household in the city was $24,625, and the median income for a family was $31,250. Males had a median income of $25,417 versus $25,625 for females. The per capita income for the city was $11,394. About 21.8% of families and 21.6% of the population were below the poverty line, including 30.7% of those under age 18 and 10.8% of those age 65 or over.

== Education ==
The City of Fruitvale is served by the Fruitvale Independent School District. The Fruitvale Independent School District consists of Hallie Randall Elementary (HS–5), Fruitvale Junior High (6–8), and Fruitvale High School (9–12). Fruitvale ISD is a 1A school with a typical graduating class of 25 students.

== Law Enforcement ==
Fruitvale has no police department so they are served by local Van Zandt County Sheriff's deputies. Fruitvale has a volunteer fire department.

== Politics ==
Fruitvale is heavily Republican, like the rest of Van Zandt County and East Texas. Fruitvale has voted for the Republican presidential candidate in all presidential elections since 1984. In 2016, Donald Trump received 85% of the vote in Fruitvale. Fruitvale also consistently votes Republican in state and local elections. Before 1984, Fruitvale was heavily Democratic, along with the rest of Van Zandt County.
