= Winona-Montgomery Consolidated School District =

School district in Mississippi, United States

The Winona-Montgomery Consolidated School District (WMCSD), formerly the Winona Separate School District, is a public school district based in Winona, Mississippi, United States. It currently serves all of Montgomery County.

Effective July 1, 2018 the Winona and Montgomery County School District were consolidated into the Winona-Montgomery Consolidated School District. The consolidation was mandated by the Mississippi state government. In 2018 the Montgomery School District attempted to get a restraining order to stop the consolidation. The current district was formed in 2018.

The Winona Separate School District served almost all of Winona and some unincorporated areas to the southwest.

== Schools ==
- Winona Secondary School
- Winona Elementary School

== Demographics ==
=== 2007-08 school year ===
There were a total of 1,303 students enrolled in the Winona Separate School District during the 2007–2008 school year. The makeup of the district was 47% female and 53% male. The racial makeup of the district was 53.95% African American, 45.28% White, 0.31% Hispanic, and 0.46% Asian.

=== Previous school years ===
School Year	Enrollment	Gender Makeup		Racial Makeup				
School Year	Enrollment	Female	Male	Asian	African American	Hispanic	Native American	White
2006-07	1,363	48%	52%	0.44%	53.82%	0.29%	0.07%	45.36%
2005-06	1,392	48%	52%	0.43%	52.59%	0.22%	0.07%	46.70%
2004-05	1,395	47%	53%	0.36%	51.61%	0.22%	0.07%	47.74%
2003-04	1,244	50%	50%	0.32%	49.92%	0.24%	0.08%	49.44%
2002-03	1,421	49%	51%	0.28%	55.10%	0.07%	0.07%	44.48%

== Accountability statistics ==
	2007-08	2006-07	2005-06	2004-05	2003-04	2002-03
District Accreditation Status	Accredited	Accredited	Accredited	Accredited	Accredited	Accredited
School Performance Classifications
Level 5 (Superior Performing) Schools	No School; Performance; Classifications; Assigned	0	0	1	0	0
Level 4 (Exemplary) Schools	No School; Performance; Classifications; Assigned	2	2	1	2	0
Level 3 (Successful) Schools	No School; Performance; Classifications; Assigned	0	0	0	0	2
Level 2 (Under Performing) Schools	No School; Performance; Classifications; Assigned	0	0	0	0	0
Level 1 (Low Performing) Schools	No School; Performance; Classifications; Assigned	0	0	0	0	0
Not Assigned	No School; Performance; Classifications; Assigned	0	0	0	0	0

== See also ==
- List of school districts in Mississippi
