= Big Rock, Texas =

- Unincorporated community
- Location within Texas Location within the United States
- Coordinates: 32°21′34″N 95°56′28″W
- Country: United States
- State: Texas
- County: Henderson
- Elevation: 479 ft (146 m)
- Time zone: UTC-6 (Central (CST))
  - Summer (DST): UTC-5 (CDT)
- Area codes: 430, 903
- GNIS feature ID: 1378006

Big Rock is an unincorporated community in Henderson County, located in the U.S. state of Texas.
