= Phalba, Texas =

- Unincorporated community
- Location within Texas Location within the United States
- Coordinates: 32.4237522°N 95.9777461°W
- Country: United States
- State: Texas
- County: Van Zandt
- Elevation: 443 ft (135 m)
- Time zone: UTC-6 (Central (CST))
  - Summer (DST): UTC-5 (CDT)
- Area codes: 903 & 430
- GNIS feature ID: 1378854

Phalba is an unincorporated community in Van Zandt County, in the U.S. state of Texas. According to the Handbook of Texas, the community had a population of 58 in 2000. It is located within the Dallas-Fort Worth metropolitan area.

== Geography ==
Phalba is located at the intersection of Texas State Highway 198 and Farm to Market Road 316, 11 mi (18 km) southwest of Canton in the southwestern portion of Van Zandt County.

== Education ==
Phalba had its own school in 1890 and had 104 students enrolled in 1904. It joined the Canton Independent School District in 1950. It also had a school in 1936. The community continues to be served by the Canton ISD to this day.
