= Tundra, Texas =

- Unincorporated community
- Location within Texas Location within the United States
- Coordinates: 32°27′50″N 95°52′50″W
- Country: United States
- State: Texas
- County: Van Zandt
- Elevation: 564 ft (172 m)
- Time zone: UTC-6 (Central (CST))
  - Summer (DST): UTC-5 (CDT)
- Area codes: 430, 903
- GNIS feature ID: 1379179

Tundra is an unincorporated community in Van Zandt County, Texas, United States. According to the Handbook of Texas, the community had a population of 34 in 2000. It is located within the Dallas/Fort Worth Metroplex.

== Geography ==
Tundra is located on Farm to Market Road 1851, 7 mi (11 km) southwest of Canton in south-central Van Zandt County.

== Education ==
Lone Star school was established in Tundra in the 1880s. It had 131 students enrolled in 1904. It continued to operate in 1936. Since the 1950s, the community has been served by the Canton Independent School District.
