= Dougherty, Rains County, Texas =

Unincorporated community in Texas, US

Coordinates: 32°57′20″N 95°46′09″W

Dougherty (formerly Daugherty) is a small unincorporated community in Rains County, Texas, United States. It lies at an elevation of 466 feet (142 m).
