= List of United States tornadoes in April 2017 =

This page documents all tornadoes confirmed by various weather forecast offices of the National Weather Service in the United States during April 2017.

== United States yearly total ==
Confirmed tornadoes by Enhanced Fujita rating
EFU	EF0	EF1	EF2	EF3	EF4	EF5	Total
67	618	592*	128	13	2	0	1,420

- Note: An EF2 tornado from Canada crossed into the United States, where that portion of the track was rated EF1.

== April ==
Confirmed tornadoes by Enhanced Fujita rating
EFU	EF0	EF1	EF2	EF3	EF4	EF5	Total
8	81	102	23	2	1	0	217

=== April 2 event ===
List of confirmed tornadoes – Sunday, April 2, 2017 (Note: All dates are based on the local time zone where the tornado touched down; however, all times are in Coordinated Universal Time for consistency.)
EF#	Location	County / Parish	State	Start Coord.	Time (UTC)	Path length	Max width
EF1	S of Lafayette	Lafayette	LA	30.1641°N 92.0189°W	14:04–14:05	0.06 mi (0.097 km)	10 yd (9.1 m)
EF1	A brief, small tornado was caught on security video lifting and overturning a car in the lot of a car body shop. Two pieces of tin were removed from the shop roof.						
EF0	Lakeway	Travis	TX	30.3652°N 98.057°W	14:15–14:18	3 mi (4.8 km)	100 yd (91 m)
EF0	Several marinas were damaged as a small tornado crossed Lake Travis. Trees were damaged.						
EF1	E of Breaux Bridge	St. Martin	LA	30.2676°N 91.8532°W	14:47–14:49	0.8 mi (1.3 km)	20 yd (18 m)
EF1	2 deaths – A single-wide mobile home was rolled, separating the roofs and walls from the structure and killing two occupants.						
EF0	SW of Riverside	Walker	TX	30.8242°N 95.4322°W	17:25–17:27	0.5 mi (0.80 km)	30 yd (27 m)
EF0	A barn was lifted and deposited across a road, and trees were damaged.						
EF1	Broaddus	San Augustine	TX	31.2699°N 94.3315°W	18:56–19:06	6.57 mi (10.57 km)	310 yd (280 m)
EF1	A waterspout moved ashore, snapping and uprooting dozens of trees along its path and striking the town of Broaddus. A covered canopy between a church and another building in town collapsed.						
EF1	SW of Alexandria	Rapides	LA	30.9925°N 92.5992°W	19:32–19:46	7.29 mi (11.73 km)	50 yd (46 m)
EF1	A few pine trees were snapped.						
EF2	W of Woodworth	Rapides	LA	31.1255°N 92.5368°W	19:50–19:59	6.11 mi (9.83 km)	800 yd (730 m)
EF2	A large swath of trees was completely flattened in the Kisatchie National Forest. Falling trees also caused damage to four homes.						
EF2	NE of Fishville to SW of Jena	LaSalle	LA	31.5788°N 92.2513°W	19:53–20:04	5.55 mi (8.93 km)	1,636 yd (1,496 m)
EF2	Several outbuildings lost siding, or sustained roof damage as a result of this large wedge tornado. An oil derrick was toppled over, with the metal severely bent, and a concrete anchor block was pulled out of the ground. A second rusty oil derrick was not only collapsed but broken into pieces as well.						
EF1	Western Alexandria	Rapides	LA	31.2499°N 92.4821°W	20:05–20:18	5.41 mi (8.71 km)	500 yd (460 m)
EF1	This tornado moved through the western part of Alexandria, damaging numerous structures. A gas station awning was damaged, the side and doors of a large storage building were blown in, and numerous trees were snapped or downed. Some trees landed on homes, garages, and vehicles. Structures sustained minor roof damage to their shingles or soffit, while flat roofs were partially lifted off businesses. Flying debris broke windows, large billboards, and other signage.						
EF1	SSW of Florien	Sabine	LA	31.3077°N 93.5838°W	20:07–20:23	9.83 mi (15.82 km)	370 yd (340 m)
EF1	Numerous trees were snapped or uprooted, much of the roof was ripped off a double-wide manufactured home, and an outbuilding was destroyed.						
EF0	W of Lena	Rapides	LA	31.4595°N 92.7846°W	20:20–20:21	0.1 mi (0.16 km)	10 yd (9.1 m)
EF0	Storm chasers drove through a brief tornado which caused no significant damage.						
EF2	E of Fishville to Trout	LaSalle	LA	31.5115°N 92.2521°W	20:52–21:12	13.66 mi (21.98 km)	2,252 yd (2,059 m)
EF2	A very large mile-wide wedge tornado hit the communities of Belah and Trout, causing considerable damage. Widespread damage occurred in Belah, with damage to the roofs of homes and a school building. Outbuildings were damaged or destroyed, many were trees blown over onto structures and vehicles, a metal truss tower was toppled over, and several power poles were broken into multiple pieces in the Belah area as well. In Trout, homes and trees sustained damage, while a boat business collapsed. Large swaths of heavily forested areas were completely flattened along the path, with every tree in the path snapped or uprooted in some areas.						
EF1	W of Georgetown	Grant, Winn	LA	31.7815°N 92.5139°W	20:54–20:57	4.1 mi (6.6 km)	1,108 yd (1,013 m)
EF1	A large wedge tornado moved through the Kisatchie National Forest, snapping and uprooting trees along its path.						
EF1	NE of Montgomery	Grant, Winn	LA	31.6917°N 92.8661°W	21:12–21:23	4.43 mi (7.13 km)	1,108 yd (1,013 m)
EF1	Numerous trees were snapped or uprooted, a truck and an RV were destroyed by fallen trees, and a house sustained roof damage. Several outbuildings were damaged, rolled, or destroyed.						
EF1	ESE of Columbia to WSW of Baskin	Caldwell, Franklin, Richland	LA	32.0597°N 91.9371°W	21:17–21:46	13.19 mi (21.23 km)	1,232 yd (1,127 m)
EF1	This large wedge tornado snapped and uprooted many trees, and ripped tin roofing off of a house.						
EF2	N of Midway	LaSalle	LA	31.7476°N 92.1618°W	21:18–21:20	1.09 mi (1.75 km)	440 yd (400 m)
EF2	Several homes sustained damage, mainly due to flying debris and falling trees, including a mobile home that was almost completely destroyed by falling trees. One well-constructed residence has its carport collapse atop two vehicles, while a second home was shifted 10 feet off of its pier and beam foundation. A third well-built brick home lost its roof entirely, and numerous power poles and trees were snapped.						
EF2	NE of Jena to NNW of Harrisonburg	LaSalle, Catahoula	LA	31.7365°N 92.0389°W	21:22–21:42	13.77 mi (22.16 km)	880 yd (800 m)
EF2	This tornado struck the community of Aimwell. A few homes sustained roof damage, outbuildings were destroyed, a brick church sustained damage to its roof and walls, numerous large trees and many power poles were snapped, and a mobile home was flipped. Another mobile home lost its awning as well. One person was injured.						
EF1	SW of Mangham	Richland	LA	32.2377°N 91.8523°W	21:48–21:53	3.69 mi (5.94 km)	300 yd (270 m)
EF1	A metal building was damaged, a fence was flattened, and numerous trees were snapped or uprooted. A home and a shed sustained minor roof damage.						
EF1	NW of Baskin	Richland, Franklin	LA	32.2603°N 91.784°W	21:49–21:59	4.77 mi (7.68 km)	880 yd (800 m)
EF1	A power pole and several trees were snapped. One mobile home was destroyed while a second had its shingles ripped off.						
EF2	SE of Winnsboro	Franklin	LA	32.087°N 91.6894°W	22:09–22:22	5.83 mi (9.38 km)	616 yd (563 m)
EF2	Numerous trees were snapped, power poles were broken, a small trailer was tossed, and a shed and a residence sustained minor roof damage. One small home built on blocks was completely destroyed, a horse trailer was flipped, and a mobile home was tossed 10 ft (3.3 yd).						
EF0	NE of Gilbert	Tensas, Madison	LA	32.1898°N 91.4893°W	22:41–22:44	1.4 mi (2.3 km)	100 yd (91 m)
EF0	A few trees and limbs were snapped.						
EF1	W of Brookhaven to SSE of Wesson	Franklin, Lincoln	MS	31.5727°N 90.6494°W	05:57–06:22	17.48 mi (28.13 km)	1,056 yd (966 m)
EF1	Trees were snapped or uprooted. Barns, mobile homes, and houses sustained minor roof or siding damage. At least six utility poles were snapped.						

=== April 3 event ===
List of confirmed tornadoes – Monday, April 3, 2017
EF#	Location	County / Parish	State	Start Coord.	Time (UTC)	Path length	Max width
EF1	NW of Madisonville	St. Tammany	LA	30.44°N 90.21°W	09:03–09:08	1.2 mi (1.9 km)	50 yd (46 m)
EF1	Multiple pine trees were snapped, fences were flattened, garage doors sustained minor damage, and playground equipment was damaged.						
EF1	N of Covington	St. Tammany	LA	30.5265°N 90.075°W	09:14–09:19	1.76 mi (2.83 km)	100 yd (91 m)
EF1	Numerous trees were downed, including one that fell on a home. Other structures sustained minor to moderate roof damage.						
EF0	Luverne	Crenshaw	AL	31.7176°N 86.2619°W	13:54–13:55	0.05 mi (0.080 km)	25 yd (23 m)
EF0	A few homes in town sustained shingle damage, and a few homes were damaged by falling trees. An unanchored single-wide mobile home was pushed off its foundation and destroyed. Significant power line damage was observed as well.						
EF1	Western Carrollton	Carroll	GA	33.5688°N 85.1141°W	14:58–15:02	2.37 mi (3.81 km)	300 yd (270 m)
EF1	A tornado touched down near the University of West Georgia, snapping and uprooting trees. A fire station had its styrofoam-metal roof pulled off, destroying a portion of the concrete exterior wall.						
EF1	Northern Chattahoochee Hills	Fulton	GA	33.5678°N 84.7811°W	15:28–15:37	4.07 mi (6.55 km)	150 yd (140 m)
EF1	A tornado touched down intermittently as it moved through the northern part of Chattahoochee Hills, snapping or uprooting hundreds of trees.						
EF1	Columbus	Muscogee	GA	32.4443°N 84.9555°W	15:42–15:48	3.27 mi (5.26 km)	175 yd (160 m)
EF1	Numerous trees were downed in Columbus, some of which landed on homes and cars. Many residences sustained either roof damage or had skirting blown away. An apartment complex had a substantial portion of its roof removed.						
EF0	SW of Lumpkin	Stewart	GA	32.0336°N 84.8361°W	16:10–16:12	1.56 mi (2.51 km)	150 yd (140 m)
EF0	Stewart County High School had roofing material ripped off, causing water damage within the structure. Bleachers on an adjacent baseball field were overturned, sections of fencing were flattened, and trees were snapped.						
EF0	SW of Richland	Stewart	GA	32.0692°N 84.7015°W	16:16–16:18	1.35 mi (2.17 km)	100 yd (91 m)
EF0	A small shed had roof panels ripped off, and a few trees were knocked down.						
EF1	E of Dahlonega	Lumpkin	GA	34.4858°N 83.9252°W	16:17–16:26	4.61 mi (7.42 km)	350 yd (320 m)
EF1	Numerous trees were snapped or uprooted. Barns and sheds sustained significant damage, a home was damaged, and a large local chicken coop was collapsed.						
EF0	NE of Talbotton	Talbot	GA	32.6956°N 84.5267°W	16:18–16:22	2.23 mi (3.59 km)	75 yd (69 m)
EF0	A few trees were snapped, and several trampolines were tossed.						
EF1	SW of Thomaston	Talbot	GA	32.7458°N 84.4357°W	16:26–16:32	3.65 mi (5.87 km)	200 yd (180 m)
EF1	An old barn and a small shed were completely destroyed, and numerous large trees were snapped or uprooted.						
EF0	NW of Preston	Webster	GA	32.1409°N 84.6112°W	16:29–16:33	3.88 mi (6.24 km)	150 yd (140 m)
EF0	Many trees were snapped or uprooted, including one that fell on a car.						
EF0	Northwestern Griffin	Spalding	GA	33.2599°N 84.2874°W	16:35–16:37	0.59 mi (0.95 km)	150 yd (140 m)
EF0	A brief tornado touched down near the University of Georgia campus in Griffin, snapping or uprooting many trees. Some trees landed on homes and caused major structural damage.						
EF0	S of Thomaston	Upson	GA	32.8198°N 84.3151°W	16:36–16:39	1.74 mi (2.80 km)	75 yd (69 m)
EF0	Some homes sustained minor roof damage. Several trees were snapped or uprooted.						
EF1	SE of Thomaston	Upson	GA	32.843°N 84.2483°W	16:44–16:52	6.67 mi (10.73 km)	150 yd (140 m)
EF1	Numerous trees were snapped and uprooted. A church sustained minor damage.						
EF1	Ellaville	Schley	GA	32.2295°N 84.3569°W	16:46–16:56	5.48 mi (8.82 km)	200 yd (180 m)
EF1	Dozens of trees were snapped and uprooted, and several homes sustained damage. One large metal building collapsed onto peanut storage bins while a second was caved in. Mobile homes were overturned. In total, over 40 homes were damaged (including 3 destroyed by fallen trees), 12 businesses sustained damage, and the whole city of Ellaville lost power for more than 24 hours.						
EF0	S of Locust Grove	Henry	GA	33.3184°N 84.1156°W	16:52–16:55	1.77 mi (2.85 km)	250 yd (230 m)
EF0	Numerous shingles were ripped off one residence. Numerous trees were snapped or uprooted, of which one landed on and caused significant roof and exterior wall damage to a home.						
EF1	NNW of Bolingbroke	Monroe	GA	32.9899°N 83.9028°W	17:06–17:22	8.13 mi (13.08 km)	300 yd (270 m)
EF1	Numerous homes sustained roof damage from wind or fallen trees. Trees also landed on cars and blocked highways. A small garage roof was damaged. In total, over 30 homes sustained damage, of which 9 were impacted severely and 1 was completely destroyed.						
EF1	Byron to Warner Robins	Peach, Houston	GA	32.6576°N 83.7657°W	17:30–17:45	9.23 mi (14.85 km)	600 yd (550 m)
EF1	Trees were snapped or uprooted, some of which caused roof damage to homes.						
EF0	SE of Hillsboro	Jones	GA	33.146°N 83.6046°W	17:40–17:46	2.94 mi (4.73 km)	100 yd (91 m)
EF0	One home sustained minor damage, and trees were snapped or uprooted.						
EF1	Central	Pickens	SC	34.728°N 82.781°W	17:51–17:52	0.09 mi (0.14 km)	40 yd (37 m)
EF1	Dozens of trees were downed in Central as a result of this brief tornado embedded in straight-line winds.						
EF1	NE of Robins Air Force Base	Twiggs	GA	32.6682°N 83.5264°W	17:56–18:04	5.8 mi (9.3 km)	440 yd (400 m)
EF1	Trees were snapped or uprooted.						
EF2	Gordon	Wilkinson	GA	32.8592°N 83.3733°W	18:03–18:13	3.26 mi (5.25 km)	200 yd (180 m)
EF2	This tornado caused heavy damage to businesses in downtown Gordon. A food mart sustained collapse of its roof, and other nearby buildings sustained significant structural damage. A vehicle was totaled, and several trees were snapped as well.						
EF1	Southern Jeffersonville to NNE of Danville	Twiggs, Wilkinson	GA	32.6758°N 83.3528°W	18:06–18:18	7.91 mi (12.73 km)	350 yd (320 m)
EF1	Tornado caused roof damage to a funeral home and moved several AC units off the roof to a side section; a few metal support cables to power poles were snapped as well. Several trees were snapped or uprooted, a residence had most of its shingles blown off, and part of a barn's metal roof was also blown off.						
EF0	SE of Oakfield	Worth	GA	31.72°N 83.9°W	18:10	0.01 mi (0.016 km)	10 yd (9.1 m)
EF0	Video relayed by WALB-TV documented a tornado.						
EF0	Berea	Pickens, Greenville	SC	34.859°N 82.507°W	18:13–18:15	2.84 mi (4.57 km)	50 yd (46 m)
EF0	Metal sheeting was ripped off the roofs of outbuildings on a farm, with a nearby house sustaining shingle damage. Trees were downed in and to the west of Berea.						
EF0	N of McIntyre	Wilkinson	GA	32.8899°N 83.2291°W	18:16–18:23	4.11 mi (6.61 km)	90 yd (82 m)
EF0	A residence sustained minor roof damage, and trees were snapped.						
EF0	WNW of Sparta	Hancock	GA	33.2938°N 83.1208°W	18:21–18:25	3.26 mi (5.25 km)	200 yd (180 m)
EF0	Numerous trees were snapped or uprooted and a small shed was destroyed.						
EF0	N of Montrose to NNE of Dudley	Wilkinson, Laurens	GA	32.667°N 83.124°W	18:26–18:39	6.57 mi (10.57 km)	150 yd (140 m)
EF0	Several trees were snapped or uprooted.						
EF1	S of Toomsboro	Wilkinson	GA	32.775°N 83.0829°W	18:28–18:30	0.17 mi (0.27 km)	100 yd (91 m)
EF1	A single-wide trailer was shifted off its foundation, while a second trailer sustained shingle loss and a collapse of its carport. Trees were snapped.						
EF1	SW of Sandersville	Washington	GA	32.9203°N 82.9996°W	18:36–18:41	5.72 mi (9.21 km)	250 yd (230 m)
EF1	A church and a residence sustained roof damage, and numerous large trees were snapped or uprooted.						
EF0	NW of Laurens	Laurens	SC	34.554°N 82.07°W	18:49–18:50	0.74 mi (1.19 km)	75 yd (69 m)
EF0	Trees were damaged, and minor structural damage was observed.						
EF0	NE of Sandersville	Washington	GA	33.0514°N 82.7538°W	18:56–18:58	0.39 mi (0.63 km)	150 yd (140 m)
EF0	Numerous trees were snapped and uprooted.						
EF1	S of Edge Hill	Washington, Jefferson	GA	33.0454°N 82.6641°W	19:00–19:10	7.52 mi (12.10 km)	300 yd (270 m)
EF1	A large barn sustained damage to its metal roof, a barn was demolished, and numerous trees were snapped or uprooted. A home and a shed sustained minor damage as well.						
EF1	N of Whitmire	Union	SC	34.582°N 81.606°W	19:21–19:23	0.74 mi (1.19 km)	150 yd (140 m)
EF1	1 death – A mobile home was overturned and rolled off its frame, killing one person inside.						
EF0	NW of Carlisle	Union	SC	34.62°N 81.49°W	19:30	0.01 mi (0.016 km)	50 yd (46 m)
EF0	A few trees were knocked down.						
EF0	Aiken	Aiken	SC	33.53°N 81.74°W	20:08–20:09	0.06 mi (0.097 km)	25 yd (23 m)
EF0	Several trees were downed in multiple directions by this brief tornado.						
EF1	S of Monetta	Aiken	SC	33.801°N 81.62°W	20:14–20:16	0.87 mi (1.40 km)	100 yd (91 m)
EF1	Numerous pine trees were snapped.						
EF0	E of Gifford	Hampton	SC	32.86°N 81.19°W	20:43–20:44	0.28 mi (0.45 km)	240 yd (220 m)
EF0	Small trees were uprooted by this brief tornado.						
EF2	N of Cameron	Calhoun	SC	33.59°N 80.787°W	21:11–21:22	6.72 mi (10.81 km)	600 yd (550 m)
EF2	A row of power poles were snapped near their base. Several barns and large metal storage buildings were heavily damaged, with their anchors removed from the ground. Homes sustained roof damage, numerous trees were snapped or uprooted, and a pivot tilt irrigation system was overturned.						

=== April 4 event ===
List of confirmed tornadoes – Tuesday, April 4, 2017
EF#	Location	County / Parish	State	Start Coord.	Time (UTC)	Path length	Max width
EF2	Goodman to SW of Granby	McDonald, Newton	MO	36.7197°N 94.4324°W	23:48–00:05	16.5 mi (26.6 km)	300 yd (270 m)
EF2	Significant damage occurred in the town of Goodman, where an elementary school had much of its roof torn off and sustained collapse of multiple exterior walls. A fire station and several homes in town also sustained severe damage. Less significant damage occurred to the northeast of town before the tornado dissipated. Many trees were snapped and uprooted along the path.						
EF1	NW of Seligman	Barry	MO	36.5419°N 93.9877°W	00:56–00:58	1.5 mi (2.4 km)	200 yd (180 m)
EF1	This tornado caused severe damage to a chicken farm and damaged numerous trees.						
EF1	NNE of Bergman	Boone	AR	36.3604°N 93.0267°W	02:34–02:39	5 mi (8.0 km)	200 yd (180 m)
EF1	Homes had roofing and siding ripped off, and a garage and a mobile home were destroyed.						

=== April 5 event ===
List of confirmed tornadoes – Wednesday, April 5, 2017
EF#	Location	County / Parish	State	Start Coord.	Time (UTC)	Path length	Max width
EF2	ESE of Bakerhill, AL to WNW of Morris, GA	Barbour (AL), Henry (AL), Quitman (GA)	AL, GA	31.7595°N 85.1753°W	15:49–16:04	10.96 mi (17.64 km)	1,140 yd (1,040 m)
EF2	A double wide mobile home was shifted about 8 feet (2.4 m), and its anchors where pulled from the ground, a brick home had most of its roof removed, and the walls of a brick outbuilding were collapsed by this large wedge tornado. Near the brick home, many trees were snapped or uprooted, two of which sustained some debarking, and an irrigation pivot was toppled. Trees were uprooted along the path, and several homes were damaged by falling trees.						
EF1	SW of Peachtree City	Coweta	GA	33.3700°N 84.6655°W	16:03–16:09	3.98 mi (6.41 km)	350 yd (320 m)
EF1	Trees were snapped along the path.						
EF1	N of Covington	Newton, Walton	GA	33.7202°N 83.8795°W	16:09–16:12	2.94 mi (4.73 km)	350 yd (320 m)
EF1	Multiple trees were snapped or uprooted, including one that damaged a vehicle.						
EF2	S of Lumpkin to E of Weston	Randolph, Stewart, Webster	GA	31.9114°N 84.8277°W	16:27–16:55	16.86 mi (27.13 km)	1,320 yd (1,210 m)
EF2	Numerous trees were snapped or uprooted by this large wedge tornado, which prompted the issuance of a tornado emergency. A small trailer park was impacted, where two trailers sustained moderate roof damage and a third was largely destroyed. Power lines and small farm outbuildings were damaged, two chicken houses were destroyed, and a peanut farm storage building was destroyed as well.						
EF2	Northeastern Johnston to NNW of Ridge Spring	Edgefield, Saluda	SC	33.839°N 81.794°W	17:19–17:28	7.3 mi (11.7 km)	1,000 yd (910 m)
EF2	At the beginning of the path, a carport collapsed, while a barn and a deer processing business in the northeastern part of Johnston had metal roofing ripped off as a result of this large wedge tornado. Homes sustained shingle and siding damage at multiple points along path, including within the town of Ward, where trees were downed as well. Falling trees caused damage to homes and vehicles, outbuildings were damaged or destroyed, and the top of a concrete silo was destroyed. Many trees were snapped and uprooted along the path, a few of which sustained some low-end debarking. One person was injured.						
EF0	SW of Plains	Sumter	GA	32.005°N 84.4282°W	17:40–17:46	3.16 mi (5.09 km)	150 yd (140 m)
EF0	Several trees were snapped or uprooted, and a few homes sustained minor roof damage. This tornado was produced by the same storm that produced the Lumpkin EF2 tornado, and a tornado emergency was issued for it as a result.						
EF1	W of Vienna	Dooly	GA	32.0574°N 83.9476°W	17:55–18:13	8.77 mi (14.11 km)	200 yd (180 m)
EF1	After the Plains EF0 tornado dissipated, the same storm produced this tornado, which remained under a tornado emergency for its entire existence. The second floor of a poorly constructed home was completely destroyed. A large crop irrigation system was overturned, and trees were snapped or uprooted.						
EF0	NW of Lexington	Lexington	SC	34.0054°N 81.278°W	18:06–18:10	0.01 mi (0.016 km)	75 yd (69 m)
EF0	A brief tornado uprooted a large tree.						
EF1	S of Empire	Dodge	GA	32.2761°N 83.2887°W	19:05–19:14	4.1 mi (6.6 km)	350 yd (320 m)
EF1	Several trees were snapped or uprooted. A travel trailer and a small barn were destroyed, while a metal car was lofted and never found. A van was moved, leaving scars in the ground. A church and numerous homes sustained some roof damage.						
EF1	ESE of Carbondale	Williamson	IL	37.7004°N 89.1492°W	19:10–19:11	0.1 mi (0.16 km)	25 yd (23 m)
EF1	One residence sustained minor shingle damage while a second sustained damage to its east-facing side, with its cupola destroyed and roof uplifted as well. Trees were snapped and thrown.						
EF2	E of Cadwell to NW of Soperton	Laurens, Truetlen	GA	32.3323°N 82.9856°W	19:38–20:07	20.19 mi (32.49 km)	400 yd (370 m)
EF2	Dozens of trees were snapped or uprooted. A large autobody repair shop was destroyed, the second floor of a well-built home was mostly destroyed, and a large triangle ratio antenna tower was bent over. Several outbuildings were destroyed, and many homes sustained roof damage.						
EF1	S of Shelbyville	Bedford	TN	35.4125°N 86.5069°W	20:47–20:55	7.1 mi (11.4 km)	150 yd (140 m)
EF1	A rare anticyclonic landspout touched down, snapping and uprooting dozens of trees. Several homes sustained roof damage, and a couple of mobile homes lost their underpinning. A boat was blown across a parking lot, a few cars were shifted, and a dumpster was tossed. Some playground equipment at Coopers Steel Manufacturing was toppled.						
EF0	WNW of Ranburne	Cleburne	AL	33.5342°N 85.3868°W	21:44–21:45	0.25 mi (0.40 km)	75 yd (69 m)
EF0	Part of the roof of a chicken house was removed, with the debris scattered across a nearby pasture.						
EF1	ENE of Eminence	Henry	KY	38.373°N 85.144°W	21:54–21:56	1.72 mi (2.77 km)	100 yd (91 m)
EF1	Anticyclonic tornado damaged barns and blew in a home's garage door.						
EF1	S of McMinnville	Warren	TN	35.5627°N 85.7538°W	21:59–22:06	3.4 mi (5.5 km)	125 yd (114 m)
EF1	A large barn and other outbuildings and sheds were heavily damaged. A mobile home was destroyed, and trees were snapped or uprooted. One person was injured.						
EF1	SE of Cannelburg	Daviess	IN	38.6418°N 86.9805°W	22:04–22:05	1.2 mi (1.9 km)	90 yd (82 m)
EF1	A home sustained roof damage. Two barns, two outbuildings, and a silo were destroyed. Two wooden power poles were snapped.						
EF1	NW of Center	Metcalfe	KY	37.154°N 85.714°W	22:11–22:13	0.69 mi (1.11 km)	50 yd (46 m)
EF1	One barn was heavily damaged while the doors of a second were blown in. A third barn on a farm had its back end ripped off, while a large silo was collapsed. Several trees were snapped.						
EF1	N of Center	Metcalfe	KY	37.1508°N 85.6958°W	22:12–22:13	0.39 mi (0.63 km)	50 yd (46 m)
EF1	A large, well-built barn was destroyed, and several trees were snapped.						
EF1	NE of Center	Green	KY	37.1804°N 85.669°W	22:16–22:17	0.75 mi (1.21 km)	250 yd (230 m)
EF1	A multiple-vortex tornado destroyed a large, well-built barn as well as two smaller outbuildings and a fifth-wheel trailer.						
EF0	SW of Enon	Clark	OH	39.8709°N 83.9524°W	22:51–22:52	0.08 mi (0.13 km)	40 yd (37 m)
EF0	Large sections of roof material was ripped off barns and farm buildings. The southward-facing garage door to a farm home was blown inward. Two combines in an outbuilding were pushed downwind after the structure collapsed.						
EF0	W of Springfield	Clark	OH	39.9358°N 83.9143°W	22:58–22:59	0.11 mi (0.18 km)	40 yd (37 m)
EF0	Several homes sustained roof and siding damage, with debris splatter evident. Trees were damaged.						
EF1	Union Hill	Chambers	AL	33.0037°N 85.5402°W	01:39–01:43	1.96 mi (3.15 km)	125 yd (114 m)
EF1	Several trees were uprooted and large branches snapped. A small fire station building and a barn sustained significant damage.						
EF0	NNW of Antreville	Anderson	SC	34.42°N 82.55°W	04:20–04:21	0.14 mi (0.23 km)	50 yd (46 m)
EF0	Brief, weak tornado produced mainly tree damage.						
EF0	Southwestern Honea Path	Anderson	SC	34.44°N 82.4°W	04:30–04:31	0.06 mi (0.097 km)	30 yd (27 m)
EF0	Numerous trees, a patio, and a carport were damaged in the southwestern part of Honea Path.						

=== April 6 event ===
List of confirmed tornadoes – Thursday, April 6, 2017
EF#	Location	County / Parish	State	Start Coord.	Time (UTC)	Path length	Max width
EF2	SE of Yeehaw Junction	Okeechobee	FL	27.5739°N 80.8352°W	13:51–14:01	4.12 mi (6.63 km)	150 yd (140 m)
EF2	Many trees were snapped, twisted, and uprooted. Three manufactured homes were destroyed and an additional 17 houses were damaged.						
EF0	SSE of Cape Coral	Lee	FL	26.5°N 82.089°W	14:18–14:20	1.61 mi (2.59 km)	10 yd (9.1 m)
EF0	A waterspout moved ashore, destroying a mobile home, damaging trees and car ports, and lifting a metal dock out of the water.						
EF1	Irvington	Lancaster	VA	37.647°N 76.435°W	16:09–16:12	3.71 mi (5.97 km)	200 yd (180 m)
EF1	Homes in town had their roofing material, gutters or awnings, and siding material damaged. Numerous trees were snapped or uprooted.						
EF0	N of Unionville	Orange	VA	38.28°N 77.97°W	16:29–16:33	2.63 mi (4.23 km)	175 yd (160 m)
EF0	Many trees were snapped or uprooted, a few of which damaged structures upon falling. Metal roofing and siding was ripped from businesses, while several homes sustained minor damage to their shingles and gutters.						
EF0	SW of Warrenton	Fauquier	VA	38.6746°N 77.8656°W	16:58–16:59	0.86 mi (1.38 km)	50 yd (46 m)
EF0	A weak tornado snapped or uprooted trees.						
EF0	New Baltimore	Fauquier	VA	38.77°N 77.72°W	17:08–17:10	0.86 mi (1.38 km)	75 yd (69 m)
EF0	Wooden fences were downed. Roofing was ripped from a barn and several outbuildings. Trees were snapped or uprooted, some of which damaged cars. Many homes sustained damage to their shingles, siding, and gutters.						
EF0	N or Airlie	Fauquier	VA	38.75°N 77.82°W	17:08–17:14	6.12 mi (9.85 km)	75 yd (69 m)
EF0	Medium to large-sized trees were snapped or uprooted.						
EF0	SSE of Hickory	City of Chesapeake	VA	36.619°N 76.214°W	17:09–17:13	4.4 mi (7.1 km)	100 yd (91 m)
EF0	An RV was destroyed, siding was stripped off a house, and numerous pine trees were snapped.						
EF0	NNW of Herndon	Fairfax, Loudoun	VA	38.97°N 77.41°W	17:34–17:38	3.2 mi (5.1 km)	25 yd (23 m)
EF0	Many trees were downed and fencing was damaged in Oak Grove due to this brief, weak tornado.						
EF0	Arlington, VA, to Washington, D.C.	Arlington, Washington, D.C.	VA, DC	38.85°N 77.07°W	17:39–17:45	4.91 mi (7.90 km)	50 yd (46 m)
EF0	A tornado touched down near the Army-Navy Country Club and caused damage to light poles in The Pentagon parking lot. It crossed the Potomac River before moving onshore at the George Mason Memorial over the Tidal Basin. Multiple hardwood and softwood trees were snapped or uprooted in this area. Damage continued into downtown Washington, D.C., with the St. Aloysius Church sustaining roof damage. One person was injured.						
EF0	Bolling Air Force Base	Washington, D.C.	DC	38.8313°N 77.0243°W	17:41–17:43	1.56 mi (2.51 km)	25 yd (23 m)
EF0	This tornado downed 15 to 20 pine trees. Flags were stripped off their posts, a large soccer net was thrown across the athletic field, and a building sustained shingle damage. An apartment complex had its roof ripped off. One person was injured.						

=== April 9 event ===
List of confirmed tornadoes – Sunday, April 9, 2017
EF#	Location	County / Parish	State	Start Coord.	Time (UTC)	Path length	Max width
EF0	W of Cortland	Gage	NE	40.51°N 96.76°W	01:51–01:52	0.13 mi (0.21 km)	10 yd (9.1 m)
EF0	A storm chaser reported a brief tornado; no damage occurred.						

=== April 10 event ===
List of confirmed tornadoes – Monday, April 10, 2017
EF#	Location	County / Parish	State	Start Coord.	Time (UTC)	Path length	Max width
EF1	WNW of Wausau	Marathon	WI	44.979°N 89.741°W	05:54–05:55	0.44 mi (0.71 km)	100 yd (91 m)
EF1	Two homes sustained considerable damage, one of which had its attached garage destroyed. Approximately 100 mature pine trees were snapped, and many other homes and structures sustained minor damage.						
EF1	WNW of Arp	Smith	TX	32.2484°N 95.1026°W	00:10–00:12	0.47 mi (0.76 km)	100 yd (91 m)
EF1	Several trees were uprooted.						
EF1	W of Overton	Smith, Rusk	TX	32.2782°N 94.9999°W	00:35–00:42	1.83 mi (2.95 km)	250 yd (230 m)
EF1	A home sustained minor shingle damage, while trees were snapped and uprooted.						
EF1	NNW of Freeport	Kent, Ionia	MI	42.784°N 85.3669°W	00:36–00:41	5.33 mi (8.58 km)	220 yd (200 m)
EF1	Dozens of large trees were snapped or uprooted. Three barns were severely damaged while a fourth had metal roofing ripped off.						
EF0	W of Mart	McLennan	TX	31.5478°N 96.9019°W	03:45–03:47	0.72 mi (1.16 km)	80 yd (73 m)
EF0	Trees, several sheds, and one mobile home were damaged.						

=== April 12 event ===
List of confirmed tornadoes – Wednesday, April 12, 2017
EF#	Location	County / Parish	State	Start Coord.	Time (UTC)	Path length	Max width
EFU	SSE of Granada	Prowers	CO	38.029°N 102.2885°W	22:13–22:17	0.86 mi (1.38 km)	75 yd (69 m)
EFU	A trained storm spotter witnessed a brief landspout tornado.						

=== April 13 event ===
List of confirmed tornadoes – Thursday, April 13, 2017
EF#	Location	County / Parish	State	Start Coord.	Time (UTC)	Path length	Max width
EF0	S of Oklaunion	Wilbarger	TX	34.0793°N 99.14°W	20:22	0.3 mi (0.48 km)	50 yd (46 m)
EF0	A trained storm spotter reported a tornado.						
EF0	SSE of Bend	Deschutes	OR	44.0222°N 121.2976°W	00:00–00:02	0.07 mi (0.11 km)	10 yd (9.1 m)
EF0	Tumbleweeds were lifted on R E Jewell Elementary School grounds.						

=== April 14 event ===
List of confirmed tornadoes – Friday, April 14, 2017
EF#	Location	County / Parish	State	Start Coord.	Time (UTC)	Path length	Max width
EFU	NE of Lazbuddie	Parmer, Castro	TX	34.4638°N 102.5467°W	22:59–23:07	3.09 mi (4.97 km)	50 yd (46 m)
EFU	Trained storm spotters observed a tornado.						
EF0	W of Dimmitt	Castro	TX	34.5272°N 102.4793°W	23:19–23:20	0.39 mi (0.63 km)	25 yd (23 m)
EF0	Several power poles were downed.						
EF0	SW of Dimmitt	Castro	TX	34.5017°N 102.4101°W	23:27–23:36	1.95 mi (3.14 km)	50 yd (46 m)
EF0	Several power lines were downed.						
EF0	SW of Fort Sumner	De Baca	NM	34.1096°N 104.734°W	23:33–23:42	0.46 mi (0.74 km)	40 yd (37 m)
EF0	The public reported a brief landspout tornado.						
EF3	W of Dimmitt	Castro	TX	34.572°N 102.359°W	23:36–00:04	3.55 mi (5.71 km)	1,936 yd (1,770 m)
EF3	A very large wedge tornado accompanied by multiple satellite vortices completely destroyed a metal building and scattered remnant debris hundreds of feet downwind, including large pieces of metal framing. Several homes were heavily damaged, one of which had its attached garage destroyed and lost a large section of its roof. Numerous power poles were snapped, some of which were splintered into pieces. Irrigation pivots were damaged as well.						
EFU	NE of Dimmitt	Castro	TX	34.5997°N 102.2968°W	00:45–00:47	0.5 mi (0.80 km)	10 yd (9.1 m)
EFU	A storm chaser observed a tornado.						
EFU	W of Dimmitt	Castro	TX	34.536°N 102.4118°W	01:04	0.08 mi (0.13 km)	10 yd (9.1 m)
EFU	A storm chaser observed a brief rope tornado.						
EFU	WSW of Kress	Swisher	TX	34.3212°N 101.9657°W	04:25–04:32	0.91 mi (1.46 km)	50 yd (46 m)
EFU	A storm chaser observed a tornado.						

=== April 15 event ===
List of confirmed tornadoes – Saturday, April 15, 2017
EF#	Location	County / Parish	State	Start Coord.	Time (UTC)	Path length	Max width
EF0	NNE of Dunbar	Otoe	NE	40.7086°N 96.1268°W	21:58–22:11	1.47 mi (2.37 km)	50 yd (46 m)
EF0	Storm chasers documented a tornado.						
EF0	ESE of Rush Center	Rush	KS	38.45°N 99.26°W	23:38–23:43	0.62 mi (1.00 km)	50 yd (46 m)
EF0	A trained storm spotter reported a landspout tornado.						
EF0	NNW of Burdett	Pawnee	KS	38.26°N 99.55°W	00:05–00:08	0.21 mi (0.34 km)	50 yd (46 m)
EF0	The public reported a landspout tornado.						
EF0	WNW of Westboro	Atchison	MO	40.5535°N 95.3809°W	00:25	0.03 mi (0.048 km)	10 yd (9.1 m)
EF0	A brief tornado was videoed.						
EF0	NE of Ada	Ottawa	KS	39.1734°N 97.8654°W	00:25–00:28	1.7 mi (2.7 km)	25 yd (23 m)
EF0	A landspout tornado tracked through a tree grove with minimal damage.						
EF1	NE of Anamosa	Jones	IA	42.1417°N 91.2288°W	01:50–01:55	3.22 mi (5.18 km)	25 yd (23 m)
EF1	Trees and outbuildings were damaged.						

=== April 16 event ===
List of confirmed tornadoes – Sunday, April 16, 2017
EF#	Location	County / Parish	State	Start Coord.	Time (UTC)	Path length	Max width
EFU	N of Chester	Major	OK	36.37°N 98.94°W	23:43–23:47	0.5 mi (0.80 km)	30 yd (27 m)
EFU	A KOCO-TV storm chaser documented a tornado with no damage apparent.						
EFU	N of Chester	Major	OK	36.319°N 98.29°W	00:09	0.1 mi (0.16 km)	30 yd (27 m)
EFU	A brief tornado was reported by a KOCO-TV storm chaser.						
EFU	NNW of Chester	Major	OK	36.28°N 98.94°W	00:42–00:49	2 mi (3.2 km)	30 yd (27 m)
EFU	A KOCO-TV storm chaser observed a tornado. No damage occurred.						

=== April 18 event ===
List of confirmed tornadoes – Tuesday, April 18, 2017
EF#	Location	County / Parish	State	Start Coord.	Time (UTC)	Path length	Max width
EF0	NE of Arcola	Washington	MS	33.33°N 90.80°W	17:15	0.02 mi (0.032 km)	40 yd (37 m)
EF0	Pictures of a landspout tornado were relayed through social media.						

=== April 19 event ===
List of confirmed tornadoes – Wednesday, April 19, 2017
EF#	Location	County / Parish	State	Start Coord.	Time (UTC)	Path length	Max width
EF0	SE of Carroll	Carroll	IA	42.0492°N 94.84°W	01:04–01:05	0.25 mi (0.40 km)	50 yd (46 m)
EF0	A machine shed lost a large section of its metal roofing.						

=== April 20 event ===
List of confirmed tornadoes – Thursday, April 20, 2017
EF#	Location	County / Parish	State	Start Coord.	Time (UTC)	Path length	Max width
EF1	NE of Millhousen	Decatur	IN	39.2457°N 85.4206°W	23:35–23:39	2.79 mi (4.49 km)	40 yd (37 m)
EF1	Intermittent tornado damaged a few farm outbuildings, one of which was destroyed, and snapped or uprooted numerous trees.						
EF0	NNW of Youngsville	Warren	PA	41.8877°N 79.3391°W	23:54–23:55	0.35 mi (0.56 km)	20 yd (18 m)
EF0	A brief tornado downed or uprooted 25 trees and damaged the roof of one home.						

=== April 21 event ===
List of confirmed tornadoes – Friday, April 21, 2017
EF#	Location	County / Parish	State	Start Coord.	Time (UTC)	Path length	Max width
EF0	N of Valley View	Cooke	TX	33.553°N 97.1835°W	00:22–00:24	0.29 mi (0.47 km)	25 yd (23 m)
EF0	A storm chaser reported a rain-wrapped tornado.						

=== April 22 event ===
List of confirmed tornadoes – Saturday, April 22, 2017
EF#	Location	County / Parish	State	Start Coord.	Time (UTC)	Path length	Max width
EF1	E of Wheeler to W of New Site	Prentiss	MS	34.5742°N 88.5334°W	19:45–19:55	6.46 mi (10.40 km)	200 yd (180 m)
EF1	Damage was intermittent along the path. A mobile home and some trees were damaged.						
EF0	NE of Belmont	Tishomingo	MS	34.5250°N 88.1957°W	20:20–20:27	2.67 mi (4.30 km)	100 yd (91 m)
EF0	A barn was damaged and tree damage occurred.						
EF0	N of Red Bay to NNW of Burntout	Franklin	AL	34.52°N 88.15°W	20:31–20:42	6.32 mi (10.17 km)	720 yd (660 m)
EF0	Heavy tree damage occurred, with small trees snapped, branches twisted, and a couple trees uprooted.						
EF0	SSW of Skyline	Jackson	AL	34.79°N 86.15°W	22:40–22:45	2.19 mi (3.52 km)	200 yd (180 m)
EF0	Trees were snapped or uprooted and had large limbs damaged.						
EF1	Jones Chapel	Cullman	AL	34.24°N 87.08°W	22:40–22:55	4.39 mi (7.07 km)	200 yd (180 m)
EF1	A farm house sustained roof damage, several trees were snapped or uprooted, and a farm structure was heavily damaged. Several chicken houses sustained severe damage as well.						

=== April 25 event ===
List of confirmed tornadoes – Tuesday, April 25, 2017
EF#	Location	County / Parish	State	Start Coord.	Time (UTC)	Path length	Max width
EF0	N of Byng	Pontotoc	OK	34.93°N 96.694°W	03:13–03:14	0.7 mi (1.1 km)	50 yd (46 m)
EF0	Trees and power lines were damaged.						
EF0	Holdenville	Hughes	OK	35.0763°N 96.3949°W	03:50–03:52	1.25 mi (2.01 km)	20 yd (18 m)
EF0	Windows were blown out, roofs were ripped off, and numerous trees were downed. A Walmart had its air conditioner units blown off its roof, as well as its awning destroyed.						
EF1	NW of Pryor to WNW of Adair	Mayes	OK	36.3725°N 95.3729°W	04:33–04:42	6.4 mi (10.3 km)	550 yd (500 m)
EF1	Several outbuildings and a mobile home were destroyed, several homes were damaged, and many trees were snapped and uprooted. Power poles were blown down.						
EF1	WSW of Adair	Mayes	OK	36.4000°N 95.3887°W	04:34–04:41	4.1 mi (6.6 km)	600 yd (550 m)
EF1	Homes were damaged, outbuildings were destroyed, and power poles were blown down. Many trees were snapped and uprooted as well.						
EF1	SW of Strang to NE of Pensacola	Mayes	OK	36.3790°N 95.2087°W	04:46–04:57	10.2 mi (16.4 km)	400 yd (370 m)
EF1	Several outbuildings were destroyed, power poles were blown down, and many trees were uprooted.						

=== April 26 event ===
List of confirmed tornadoes – Wednesday, April 26, 2017
EF#	Location	County / Parish	State	Start Coord.	Time (UTC)	Path length	Max width
EF1	SW of Beaver, AR to ENE of Carr Lane, MO	Carroll (AR), Barry (MO), Stone (MO)	AR, MO	36.4378°N 93.8236°W	06:22–06:38	15.69 mi (25.25 km)	1,500 yd (1,400 m)
EF1	Numerous trees were snapped and uprooted, homes were damaged, outbuildings were destroyed, and power poles were blown down.						
EF0	NNW of Chickalah	Yell	AR	35.1855°N 93.2909°W	15:04–15:05	0.51 mi (0.82 km)	50 yd (46 m)
EF0	Trees were downed, and two high voltage electric transmission towers were heavily damaged.						
EF1	SE of Clinton to NNE of Wingo	Hickman, Graves	KY	36.6334°N 88.9223°W	00:12–00:30	12.34 mi (19.86 km)	150 yd (140 m)
EF1	At least three dozen homes and buildings sustained damage, mostly to shingles, siding, and trim. One home had 1/3 of its roof removed, another home had its back porch blown off, and a large chicken house lost about 1/4 of its roof. Several small outbuildings or garages were destroyed, and hundreds of trees and tree limbs were blown down.						
EF1	NNW of Walnut Grove to E of Madden	Leake, Neshoba	MS	32.609°N 89.4624°W	03:31–03:42	10.55 mi (16.98 km)	600 yd (550 m)
EF1	Homes sustained roof and siding damage, outbuildings were damaged or destroyed, and a utility pole was snapped. Trees were snapped or uprooted, and large tree limbs were downed.						

=== April 27 event ===
List of confirmed tornadoes – Thursday, April 27, 2017
EF#	Location	County / Parish	State	Start Coord.	Time (UTC)	Path length	Max width
EF1	SSW of Mathews	Montgomery, Bullock	AL	32.1822°N 86.0712°W	14:03–14:14	5.59 mi (9.00 km)	250 yd (230 m)
EF1	A few homes sustained minor roof damage, an outbuilding had its roof removed, and trees were snapped off or knocked down.						
EF1	Northeastern Troy to NNW of Banks	Pike	AL	31.8349°N 85.9310°W	16:25–16:35	4.89 mi (7.87 km)	150 yd (140 m)
EF1	A mobile home was flipped over, homes sustained minor shingle or overhang damage, and several outbuildings were damaged or destroyed. A poorly built shed was completely destroyed and numerous trees were snapped and uprooted, and one home was damaged by falling trees.						
EF2	NW of Box Springs to NE of Junction City	Talbot, Taylor	GA	32.5409°N 84.6735°W	17:15–17:47	21.71 mi (34.94 km)	700 yd (640 m)
EF2	Four residential properties sustained damage, with barns destroyed and farmhouses damaged. Three mobile homes were damaged, and a power substation which weighed 2-3 tons was shifted 3 feet (0.91 m) off of its foundation. Trees were snapped, uprooted or blown down along the path, and other minor tree damage occurred. The most intense damage occurred in a wooded area where hundreds of trees were snapped at their bases, with very few left standing. Several trees were knocked down onto a home as well.						
EF0	NW of Clayton	Barbour	AL	31.9209°N 85.5103°W	21:18–21:22	1.18 mi (1.90 km)	75 yd (69 m)
EF0	Sporadic tree damage occurred, mainly to branches.						
EF0	Clayton	Barbour	AL	31.8694°N 85.4566°W	22:59–23:03	1.28 mi (2.06 km)	175 yd (160 m)
EF0	Several structures sustained minor damage and trees were uprooted or knocked down. A large tree fell on a mobile home, injuring three people, and trees landed on several other structures.						
EF0	ENE of Kanorado	Sherman	KS	39.3644°N 101.9996°W	23:21–23:25	1.48 mi (2.38 km)	50 yd (46 m)
EF0	Law enforcement reported a tornado.						

=== April 28 event ===
List of confirmed tornadoes – Friday, April 28, 2017
EF#	Location	County / Parish	State	Start Coord.	Time (UTC)	Path length	Max width
EF2	W of Cameron	Le Flore	OK	35.1017°N 94.5783°W	03:36–03:51	8.1 mi (13.0 km)	750 yd (690 m)
EF2	Mobile homes and outbuildings were destroyed, and frame homes were damaged to a lesser degree. Two metal shipping containers were thrown 50 yards, while a school bus, several cars, tractors, and a dump truck were rolled as well. A bulldozer was dragged, and power poles were snapped. Numerous trees were snapped and uprooted as well.						
EF1	Goshen	Oldham	KY	38.397°N 85.596°W	03:53–03:56	1.29 mi (2.08 km)	250 yd (230 m)
EF1	Two buildings, including the main worship center, were damaged at a large church facility in town. Numerous trees were snapped or uprooted; some trees damaged the roofs and gutters of houses. Power lines and power poles were downed. Several residences sustained significant roof damage, and barns were damaged as well.						

=== April 29 event ===
List of confirmed tornadoes – Saturday, April 29, 2017
EF#	Location	County / Parish	State	Start Coord.	Time (UTC)	Path length	Max width
EF1	WNW of Natchitoches	Natchitoches	LA	31.7571°N 93.1455°W	19:24–19:28	1.96 mi (3.15 km)	290 yd (270 m)
EF1	One home sustained roof damage while a second had several windows blown out and lost some of its siding. Numerous trees were snapped or uprooted, one of which landed on a workshop. Another falling tree crushed a house, and a dock was destroyed at Sibley Lake.						
EF1	WNW of Bellefonte	Boone	AR	36.2087°N 93.0769°W	20:16–20:18	1.89 mi (3.04 km)	100 yd (91 m)
EF1	Several trees were snapped or uprooted, some of which landed on homes. Homes sustained roof, window, and siding damage. Wooden projectiles were speared into tree branches and the ground. A metal canoe was thrown and impaled on a metal storage rack. One large home had an exterior wall bowed inward, injuring one occupant when a chandelier fell on her.						
EF0	ENE of Kampville	St. Charles	MO	38.8507°N 90.5310°W	20:31–20:35	3.85 mi (6.20 km)	100 yd (91 m)
EF0	Several homes sustained minor roof damage. Outbuildings and sheds were destroyed, trees were snapped and uprooted, and at least a half dozen boats and campers were tossed.						
EF1	NNW of Brighton	Jersey, Macoupin	IL	39.0711°N 90.1723°W	21:02–21:05	2.36 mi (3.80 km)	50 yd (46 m)
EF1	Numerous trees were snapped, twisted, and uprooted. A detached garage was completely destroyed, and a nearby home had roof damage and windows blown out.						
EF0	SW of Grand Saline	Van Zandt	TX	32.61°N 95.75°W	21:14–21:17	1.46 mi (2.35 km)	100 yd (91 m)
EF0	A brief tornado caused damage to numerous trees along its path. This tornado path was adjusted significantly in July 2025 to match radar data and the damage path on high-resolution satellite imagery.						
EF1	E of Sallisaw	Sequoyah	OK	35.4394°N 94.7782°W	21:17–21:30	7.3 mi (11.7 km)	600 yd (550 m)
EF1	Outbuildings were destroyed, power poles were snapped, and trees were uprooted.						
EF0	NE of Alexander	Morgan	IL	39.7459°N 90.0°W	21:20–21:21	0.68 mi (1.09 km)	10 yd (9.1 m)
EF0	A tornado briefly touched down in an open field. No damage occurred.						
EF0	NE of Big Rock to S of Tundra	Van Zandt	TX	32.39°N 95.91°W	21:46–21:49	2.03 mi (3.27 km)	75 yd (69 m)
EF0	See article on this tornado						
EF1	N of Natural Dam	Crawford	AR	35.6709°N 94.4602°W	21:57–22:05	5.5 mi (8.9 km)	300 yd (270 m)
EF1	A mobile home was destroyed, a house was damaged, power poles were downed, and trees were uprooted.						
EF0	E of Canton	Van Zandt	TX	32.55°N 95.83°W	22:08–22:11	1.51 mi (2.43 km)	75 yd (69 m)
EF0	See article on this tornado						
EF4	N of Log Cabin to W of Canton	Henderson, Van Zandt	TX	32.26°N 96.02°W	22:23–23:07	23.8 mi (38.3 km)	1,760 yd (1,610 m)
EF4	2 deaths – See article on this tornado – Twenty-five people were injured.						
EF2	NE of Log Cabin to SSE of Big Rock	Henderson	TX	32.26°N 95.98°W	22:47–22:57	6.5 mi (10.5 km)	100 yd (91 m)
EF2	See article on this tornado – "Multiple" people were injured.						
EF3	SE of Big Rock to Western Fruitvale to E of Dougherty	Van Zandt, Rains	TX	32.35°N 95.92°W	23:00–00:25	44.84 mi (72.16 km)	1,760 yd (1,610 m)
EF3	2 deaths – See article on this tornado – Twenty-four people were injured.						
EF0	Western Canton	Van Zandt	TX	32.54°N 95.88°W	23:02–23:04	0.98 mi (1.58 km)	50 yd (46 m)
EF0	See article on this tornado						
EF0	W of Miller Grove	Hopkins	TX	32.9906°N 95.836°W	23:32–23:50	8.57 mi (13.79 km)	100 yd (91 m)
EF0	See article on this tornado						
EF0	N of Pauline to SSW of Phalba	Van Zandt	TX	32.36°N 96.05°W	00:13–00:21	3.04 mi (4.89 km)	100 yd (91 m)
EF0	See article on this tornado						
EF1	NNW of Lindale	Smith	TX	32.5656°N 95.4619°W	00:45–00:48	2.99 mi (4.81 km)	570 yd (520 m)
EF1	See article on this tornado						
EF1	E of Mineola	Wood	TX	32.6496°N 95.4439°W	00:48–00:49	0.3 mi (0.48 km)	190 yd (170 m)
EF1	Several trees were snapped and uprooted, including one that caused extensive damage to a home upon falling.						

=== April 30 event ===
List of confirmed tornadoes – Sunday, April 30, 2017
EF#	Location	County / Parish	State	Start Coord.	Time (UTC)	Path length	Max width
EF1	N of Griffithville	White	AR	35.1512°N 91.7020°W	05:37–05:47	5.86 mi (9.43 km)	100 yd (91 m)
EF1	A mobile home was shifted off its foundation, several trees were snapped or uprooted, and several other homes sustained minor damage. Outbuildings were damaged or destroyed, with debris lofted into nearby trees. A camper trailer was flipped as well.						
EF1	S of Augusta	Woodruff	AR	35.2275°N 91.3520°W	05:57–05:58	0.76 mi (1.22 km)	80 yd (73 m)
EF1	Several trees were snapped and a metal shed was damaged. Patio furniture and a grill were tossed around at a residence as well.						
EF1	SE of Datto	Clay	AR	36.3822°N 90.7158°W	06:25–06:29	2.84 mi (4.57 km)	100 yd (91 m)
EF1	Some grain bins were destroyed, a mobile home was heavily destroyed, a residence lost most of its roof, and a few farm outbuildings were demolished.						
EF1	S of Cardwell	Mississippi, Dunklin	AR, MO	35.9859°N 90.3062°W	06:56–06:58	1.96 mi (3.15 km)	150 yd (140 m)
EF1	A metal farm building was destroyed.						
EF1	Dell	Mississippi	AR	35.8509°N 90.0657°W	07:07–07:13	5.6 mi (9.0 km)	150 yd (140 m)
EF1	Minor roof and tree damage occurred in Dell. Elsewhere along the path, a mobile home was destroyed, a frame home sustained minor damage, and metal cotton gin buildings were severely damaged or destroyed.						
EF1	NNE of Hornersville	Dunklin	MO	36.0838°N 90.0974°W	07:08–07:10	1.2 mi (1.9 km)	100 yd (91 m)
EF1	Some sheds and outbuildings were destroyed and roof damage occurred. An abandoned brick school building collapsed.						
EF1	Allport	Lonoke	AR	34.4852°N 91.8424°W	07:15–07:22	5.12 mi (8.24 km)	400 yd (370 m)
EF1	Homes in Allport sustained minor shingle damage. Southwest of town, trees were snapped or uprooted, and power poles were also snapped.						
EF2	N of Matthews to SSE of Sikeston	New Madrid	MO	36.7772°N 89.58°W	07:52–07:56	4.04 mi (6.50 km)	150 yd (140 m)
EF2	A house had its roof ripped off and had part of a rear exterior wall blown inward. A barn and some small sheds were completely destroyed, and two other barns were damaged. Large trees were uprooted and a pickup truck was damaged as well.						
EF1	W of Sikes	Winn	LA	31.9873°N 92.5856°W	08:07–08:21	6.87 mi (11.06 km)	1,760 yd (1,610 m)
EF1	Some outbuildings sustained damage as a result of this large wedge tornado. Trees were snapped and uprooted, and one home had a tree fall on its patio roof.						
EF1	W of Bunkie	Avoyelles	LA	30.9444°N 92.2257°W	09:20–09:24	0.63 mi (1.01 km)	95 yd (87 m)
EF1	Tin was ripped off outbuildings, tree limbs were snapped, and a daycare business had its metal roof ripped off. A large tree was toppled onto a carport, damaging it and several vehicles.						
EF1	NW of Oak Ridge	Morehouse	LA	32.5936°N 91.8519°W	09:44–09:54	5.71 mi (9.19 km)	50 yd (46 m)
EF1	A frame home sustained significant roof damage, a playhouse and shed were completely destroyed, and a few power poles were damaged.						
EF0	N of Pleasant Grove	Drew	AR	33.5438°N 91.7672°W	10:50–10:52	1.13 mi (1.82 km)	75 yd (69 m)
EF0	Several trees were snapped or uprooted, including some that landed on a house and caused structural damage. Another tree landed on a pickup truck. Mobile homes had skirting and roofing material ripped off, and a frame home had its back porch and part of its roof blown off. Small sheds and outbuildings were destroyed as well.						
EF2	Cloverdale	Adams	MS	31.4795°N 91.4255°W	11:14–11:24	3.44 mi (5.54 km)	440 yd (400 m)
EF2	A large portion of the roof was ripped off a home in Cloverdale. Numerous trees were snapped and uprooted; one fell on a church while a second fell on a home. Another tree landed on a car, and the roof was blown off of a stable as well.						
EF1	SW of Delta to N of Vicksburg	Madison, Warren	LA, MS	32.289°N 90.9521°W	12:13–12:27	9.24 mi (14.87 km)	440 yd (400 m)
EF1	A road sign was damaged, numerous trees were snapped and uprooted, and power lines were downed. The garage door of a building was damaged, and power poles were snapped.						
EF1	ESE of Fayette to ESE of Port Gibson	Jefferson, Claiborne	MS	31.6707°N 90.9184°W	12:24–12:42	14.44 mi (23.24 km)	440 yd (400 m)
EF1	Numerous trees were snapped and uprooted across a rural area. A power pole was snapped, and a few chicken houses sustained extensive roof damage.						
EF2	Southern Port Gibson to WNW of Utica	Claiborne, Warren	MS	31.9338°N 90.9845°W	12:30–12:55	19.9 mi (32.0 km)	880 yd (800 m)
EF2	This tornado first touched down in the southern part of Port Gibson, where a mobile home was shifted off of its foundation and had skirting ripped off, while a nearby car was spun around. Trees in town were snapped and uprooted, a few of which landed on homes. Further along the path, a large swath of trees was flattened as the tornado moved through heavily forested areas. A school building and an outbuilding sustained roof damage as well.						
EF0	NW of Hazelhurst	Copiah	MS	31.8472°N 90.4507°W	13:01–13:07	5.17 mi (8.32 km)	100 yd (91 m)
EF0	A few trees were uprooted, with many tree limbs snapped.						
EF1	SE of Learned	Hinds	MS	32.1646°N 90.5739°W	13:10–13:17	6.12 mi (9.85 km)	300 yd (270 m)
EF1	Dozens of trees were snapped or uprooted, and a power line was downed.						
EF1	WNW of Edwards	Hinds, Warren	MS	32.3406°N 90.6617°W	13:14–13:18	2.73 mi (4.39 km)	900 yd (820 m)
EF1	A few trees were uprooted, and many large tree branches were snapped.						
EF1	S of Bolton to Flora	Hinds, Madison	MS	32.3026°N 90.4686°W	13:22–13:47	20.34 mi (32.73 km)	880 yd (800 m)
EF1	A home sustained minor roof damage, a metal tractor shed was destroyed, two power poles were snapped, a mobile home sustained minor damage, and a large billboard was damaged. The tornado struck Flora before dissipating, where buildings sustained minor structural damage in the downtown area and the top of the town's old water tower was blown off.						
EF1	SW of Terry	Hinds	MS	32.0805°N 90.3322°W	13:23–13:26	1.07 mi (1.72 km)	150 yd (140 m)
EF1	A metal shed lost most of its roof and had a couple walls damaged. A horse trailer was rolled, a home had some of its siding ripped off, and trees were snapped or uprooted. A wooden power pole was bent over as well.						
EF1	N of Edwards	Hinds	MS	32.4101°N 90.5938°W	13:23–13:33	7.14 mi (11.49 km)	1,800 yd (1,600 m)
EF1	Many trees were snapped or uprooted by this large wedge tornado.						
EF1	WNW of Clinton	Hinds	MS	32.3363°N 90.4138°W	13:28–13:31	2.04 mi (3.28 km)	500 yd (460 m)
EF1	Numerous trees were snapped and uprooted, power lines were downed, and a semi-truck was overturned.						
EF0	Eastern Covington	Tipton	TN	35.5403°N 89.6447°W	13:46–13:50	2.1 mi (3.4 km)	100 yd (91 m)
EF0	This weak tornado moved through the eastern edge of Covington. Trees and power poles were damaged along the path. Crestview Middle School sustained minor damage as well.						
EF1	Kearney Park	Madison	MS	32.5864°N 90.3199°W	13:50–13:54	6.02 mi (9.69 km)	400 yd (370 m)
EF1	This tornado touched down in Kearney Park and moved to the northeast. A small metal warehouse building and several homes in town sustained minor damage. Further along the path, an outbuilding had pieces of metal roofing torn off and blown into nearby trees. Many trees were snapped and uprooted along the path.						
EF1	SE of Bentonia	Yazoo, Madison	MS	32.6166°N 90.3668°W	13:51–13:57	5.04 mi (8.11 km)	1,500 yd (1,400 m)
EF1	Trees were snapped and uprooted along the path of this large wedge tornado, and a large tree limb fell onto a home.						
EF2	ENE of Bentonia to WSW of Pickens	Yazoo	MS	32.6538°N 90.3195°W	13:54–14:17	21.7 mi (34.9 km)	2,110 yd (1,930 m)
EF2	Thousands of trees were snapped or uprooted by this massive wedge tornado, which at times exceeded a full mile in width. Some of the trees landed on homes and caused damage. Power poles were snapped, outbuildings were damaged or destroyed, the tin roof was ripped off a mobile home, and frame homes sustained mostly minor damage.						
EF1	NE of Bentonia	Yazoo	MS	32.7771°N 90.1848°W	14:06–14:14	6.88 mi (11.07 km)	1,003 yd (917 m)
EF1	High-end EF1 wedge tornado caused damage to several structures, including a home that had its entire tin roof ripped off and a residence that sustained damage to its awning. A mobile home was damaged, a barn had its roof blown off, and trees were snapped and uprooted as well.						
EF2	WSW of Pickens to Durant	Yazoo, Holmes, Attala	MS	32.8556°N 90.0951°W	14:16–14:41	23.4 mi (37.7 km)	1,900 yd (1,700 m)
EF2	1 death – This very large wedge tornado was well over a mile wide at times. Thousands of trees were snapped or uprooted, and hundreds of power poles and power lines were downed. Multiple frame homes lost large portions of their roofs, and several other homes sustained less severe damage. Four mobile homes were destroyed, including one well-anchored mobile home that was thrown 300 yards and obliterated. A few outbuildings were also damaged or destroyed. The tornado struck Durant directly before dissipating, where many trees were downed and numerous structures had roofing and siding ripped off. A few abandoned brick buildings in the downtown area were largely destroyed.						
EF1	NE of Lexington	Holmes, Carroll	MS	33.1769°N 89.9856°W	14:38–14:49	9.14 mi (14.71 km)	400 yd (370 m)
EF1	A few trees were uprooted and many tree limbs were snapped.						
EF0	Tylertown	Walthall	MS	31.12°N 90.14°W	14:39	—N/a	—N/a
EF0	A brief tornado was reported. No damage occurred.						
EF0	NE of Forest	Scott	MS	32.4074°N 89.3973°W	14:41–14:47	4.28 mi (6.89 km)	100 yd (91 m)
EF0	Many trees were uprooted, a mobile home sustained minor roof damage and had its skirting blown off, and tin was ripped off of a chicken house.						
EF1	NNE of Durant	Holmes	MS	33.136°N 89.8272°W	14:42–14:45	3.04 mi (4.89 km)	600 yd (550 m)
EF1	Numerous trees were downed along the path.						
EF1	E of West	Attala	MS	33.15°N 89.7739°W	14:42–14:46	3.85 mi (6.20 km)	600 yd (550 m)
EF1	Many trees were uprooted, including one that fell on a church.						
EF0	N of West	Carroll	MS	33.2553°N 89.7662°W	14:51–14:55	2.63 mi (4.23 km)	250 yd (230 m)
EF0	Trees were uprooted, power lines were downed, and a few shingles were ripped off of a house.						
EF2	S of Vaiden to NW of Kilmichael	Carroll, Montgomery	MS	33.3033°N 89.7531°W	14:58–15:13	15.49 mi (24.93 km)	1,936 yd (1,770 m)
EF2	This strong wedge tornado completely destroyed a large metal I-beam shed, with debris strewn up to 100 yards away. Several smaller sheds were also destroyed. Numerous trees were snapped and uprooted, power lines were downed, and numerous homes sustained roof damage either from the tornado or from falling trees.						
EF1	Kilmichael	Montgomery	MS	33.4156°N 89.5944°W	15:11–15:15	6.63 mi (10.67 km)	970 yd (890 m)
EF1	High-end EF1 tornado moved directly though Kilmichael. Two sheds were destroyed, dozens of homes in town sustained roof damage from falling trees and the tornado itself, and thousands of trees were snapped or uprooted. A tall communications tower was broken in half, and dozens of power poles and power lines were downed.						
EF1	N of Kilmichael	Montgomery	MS	33.5014°N 89.6045°W	15:13–15:19	5.63 mi (9.06 km)	800 yd (730 m)
EF1	Many trees were snapped and uprooted along the path.						
EF1	NNE of Kilmichael	Montgomery, Webster	MS	33.529°N 89.5278°W	15:14–15:20	6.76 mi (10.88 km)	650 yd (590 m)
EF1	Many trees were snapped or uprooted along the path.						
EF0	WSW of Tucker	Neshoba	MS	32.6869°N 89.0975°W	15:17–15:18	0.29 mi (0.47 km)	50 yd (46 m)
EF0	A few trees were snapped, one of which fell onto a power line. A flag pole was bent in half, and the skirting of a mobile home was damaged.						
EF1	NE of Kilmichael	Webster	MS	33.5792°N 89.5032°W	15:18–15:23	7.44 mi (11.97 km)	600 yd (550 m)
EF1	Many trees were snapped or uprooted along the path.						
EF1	W of Slate Springs	Calhoun	MS	33.738°N 89.4414°W	15:26–15:29	2.7 mi (4.3 km)	50 yd (46 m)
EF1	Several outbuildings were damaged and destroyed, and numerous trees were snapped or uprooted.						
EF1	NNW of New Hope	Lowndes	MS	33.4933°N 88.3428°W	16:37–16:43	3.82 mi (6.15 km)	440 yd (400 m)
EF1	Numerous trees were snapped or uprooted along the path. One tree fell onto a house, destroying the structure. Another home sustained high-end EF1 damage to its roof, power poles were broken, and a scoreboard at a local park was damaged.						
EF1	Livonia	Pointe Coupee	LA	30.5533°N 91.5593°W	18:15–18:17	0.9 mi (1.4 km)	50 yd (46 m)
EF1	A church had a large portion of its tin roof ripped off, a metal storage building was flipped over onto its roof, and a poorly constructed carport had its tin roof ripped off. Multiple trees were snapped as well.						
EF0	E of Zachary	East Baton Rouge	LA	30.6437°N 91.0843°W	18:50–18:52	0.3 mi (0.48 km)	40 yd (37 m)
EF0	Four mobile homes sustained minor damage, one of which had its tie-down straps ripped off, and a poorly constructed carport was destroyed. A transmission line connected to another mobile home was ripped off and thrown about 20 feet (6.1 m) up into a tree, and a wooden fence was blown down as well.						
EF0	Vinemont	Cullman	AL	34.24°N 86.87°W	19:12–19:20	10.05 mi (16.17 km)	215 yd (197 m)
EF0	Trees were snapped and uprooted. A metal roof was blown off a large garage and into a nearby residence. Minor roof and shingle damage also occurred.						

== See also ==
- Tornadoes of 2017
- List of United States tornadoes from January to March 2017
- List of United States tornadoes in May 2017
