= Tornado outbreak of April 2–3, 2017 =

Tornado outbreak in the Deep South

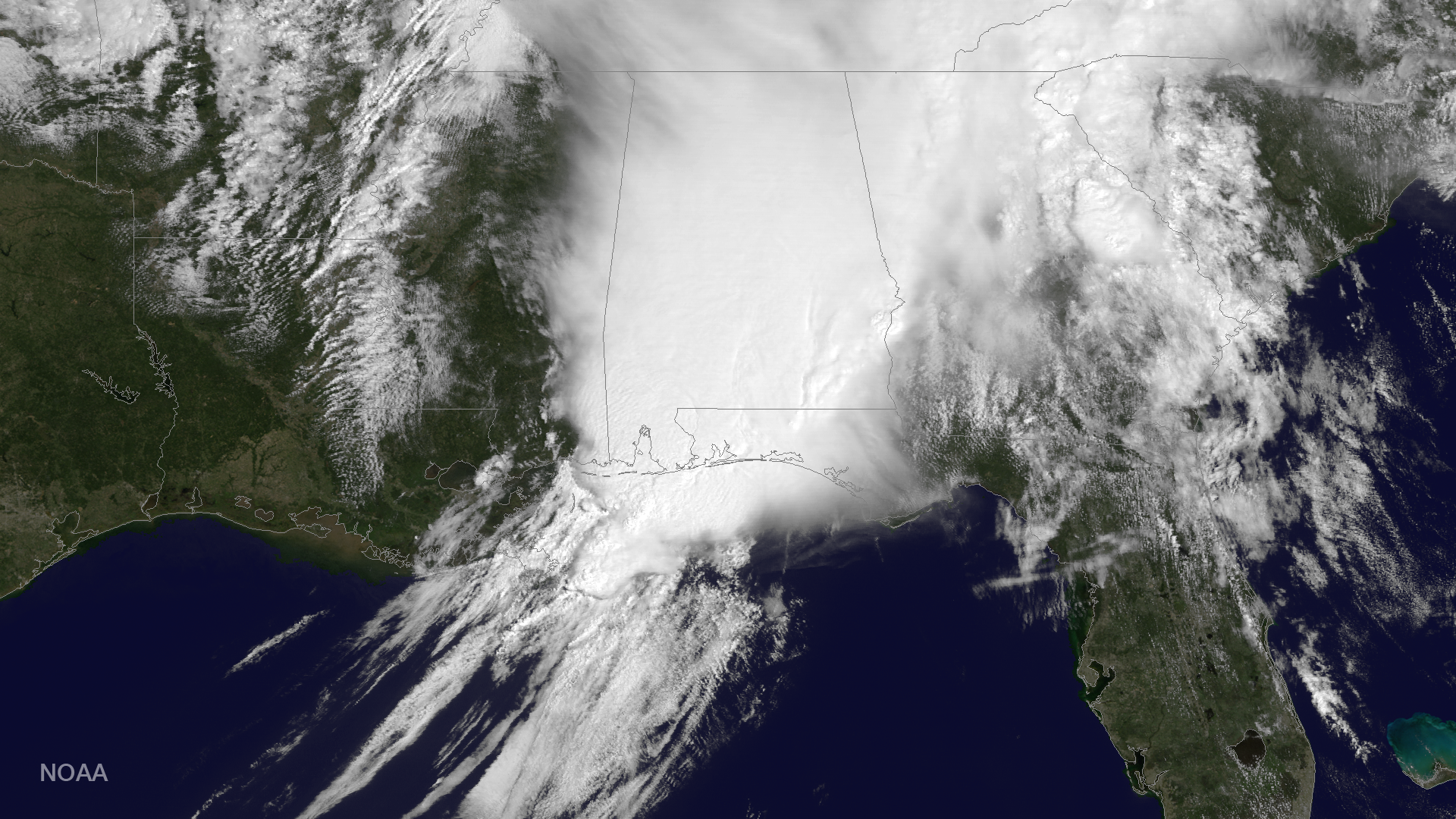
- Supercell thunderstorms appear over Alabama on April 3

Meteorological history
- Duration: April 2–3, 2017

Tornado outbreak
- Tornadoes: 62
- Max. rating: EF2 tornado
- Duration: 1 day, 17 hours, 18 minutes
- Highest winds: Tornadic – 120 mph (190 km/h) (Calhoun County, South Carolina EF2 on April 3)
- Largest hail: 2.5 in (6.4 cm); Rio Hondo, Texas

Overall effects
- Fatalities: 3 fatalities, 6 injuries
- Damage: $4.2 million (Louisiana)
- Areas affected: Deep South, Southeastern United States
- Power outages: Ellaville, Georgia (24+ hours)
- Part of the Tornadoes of 2017

Between April 2–3, 2017, the Deep South was impacted by a deadly springtime tornado outbreak. 62 confirmed tornadoes touched down in this period. Three fatalities occurred during the outbreak; one as a result of an EF1 tornado in Whitmire, South Carolina, and two after an EF1 tornado touched down near Breaux Bridge, Louisiana. The outbreak was one of the strongest to affect Louisiana since 1950, with 21 tornadoes touching down there. In Louisiana alone, over $4 million dollars in damages was sustained. The outbreak saw the second High Risk day of 2017 and caused widespread power outages in Georgia. The strongest tornadoes of the outbreak were eight EF2 tornadoes, many of which caused structural damage to communities in Louisiana, Georgia and South Carolina.

== Meteorological synopsis ==
=== April 2 ===
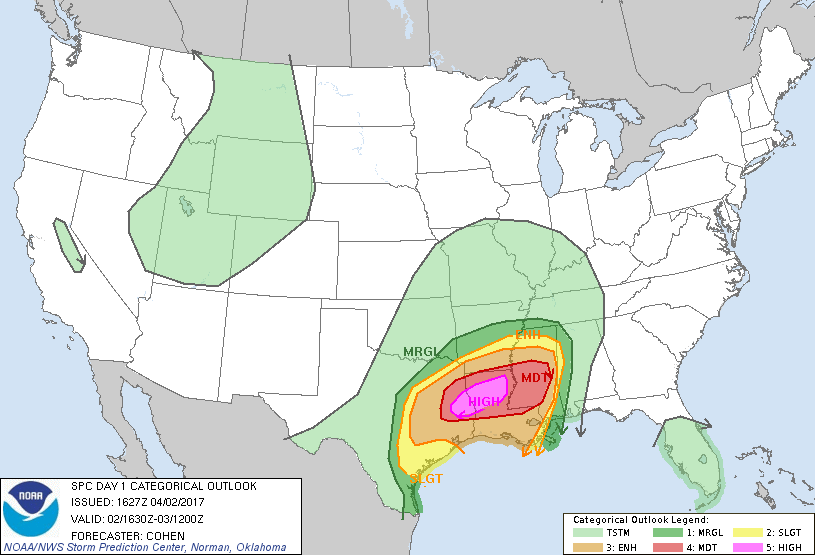
April 2: High Risk issued at 16:30 UTC, the second High Risk of the year

On April 2, 2017, a rare and volatile high shear/high CAPE atmospheric setup developed across the Deep South. Strong southerly winds, driven by an elongated jet streak pattern, enhanced low-level wind shear and transported rich Gulf moisture northward, causing dew points to rise rapidly.

At the same time, a large upper-level trough was positioned over Texas and Louisiana. As the day progressed, the trough took on a negative tilt, increasing large-scale lift and further strengthening wind shear. At the surface, an inverted trough over East Texas supported a strengthening low-pressure system that became increasingly meridional in structure. Across central Louisiana, mixed-layer CAPE (MLCAPE) values reached approximately 1500–2000 J/kg, while deep-layer wind shear ranged from 20–30 m/s.

These conditions led to the issuance of a High Risk (the most severe outlook category) by the Storm Prediction Center. The zone covered parts of Texas and Louisiana, marking the first time since 2005 that the latter had been placed under a High Risk designation. Several potentially dangerous tornadoes were forecast, and at around 9:00 AM CDT, the first tornadoes of the outbreak began to touch down in Louisiana.

=== April 3 ===
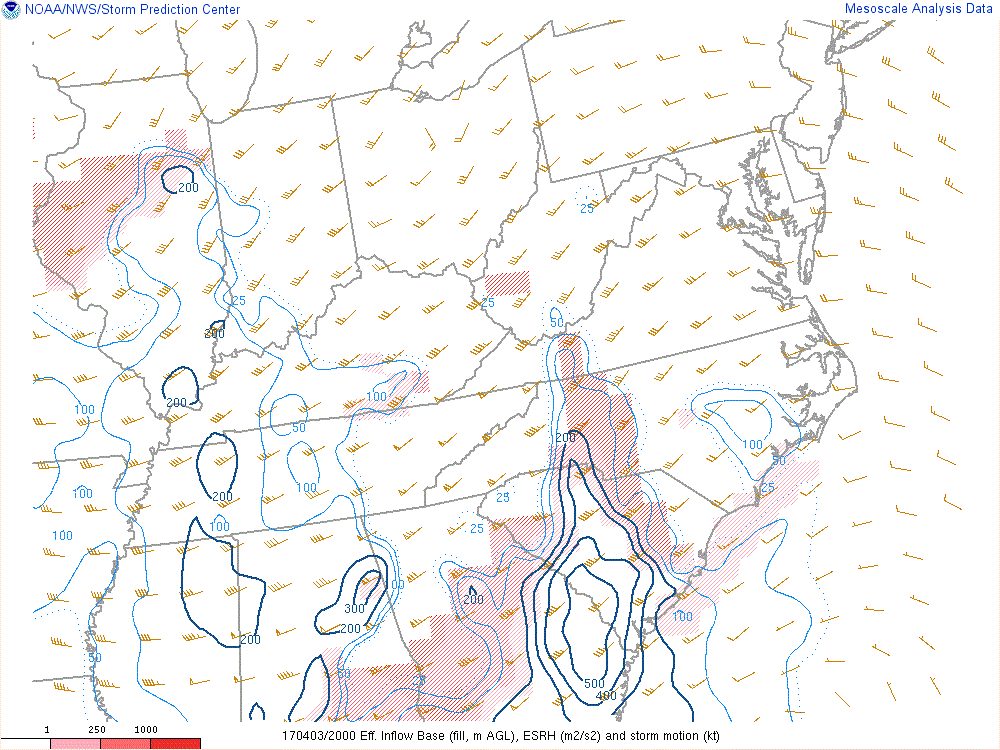
April 3: Effective layer of storm-relative helicity with storm motion and wind barbs, issued at 4 PM EDT.

The next day, on April 3, a fast-moving line of severe thunderstorms developed ahead of an advancing cold front and swept rapidly eastward across the southeastern United States. This line evolved into a quasi-linear convective system (QLCS), with strong wind shear already in place ahead of it.

As the system progressed, favorable low-level shear in the form of elevated storm-relative helicity (SRH) supported the development of numerous tornadoes along the leading edge of the line. These tornadoes were primarily embedded within the QLCS structure and formed quickly as the storms advanced into Georgia by mid-morning.

Initially, a severe thunderstorm watch was issued as the line of storms approached Georgia. As the tornado threat became more apparent, the Storm Prediction Center upgraded portions of the region to a tornado watch that covered parts of Georgia and South Carolina during the afternoon hours.

== Confirmed tornadoes ==
Confirmed tornadoes by Enhanced Fujita rating
| EFU | EF0 | EF1 | EF2 | EF3 | EF4 | EF5 | Total |
|---|---|---|---|---|---|---|---|
| 0 | 22 | 32 | 8 | 0 | 0 | 0 | 62 |

=== April 2 event ===
List of confirmed tornadoes – Sunday, April 2, 2017 (Note: All dates are based on the local time zone where the tornado touched down; however, all times are in Coordinated Universal Time for consistency.)
| EF# | Location | County / Parish | State | Start Coord. | Time (UTC) | Path length | Max width | Summary |
|---|---|---|---|---|---|---|---|---|
| EF1 | S of Lafayette | Lafayette | LA | 30.1641°N 92.0189°W | 14:04–14:05 | 0.06 mi (0.097 km) | 10 yd (9.1 m) | A brief, small tornado was caught on security video lifting and overturning a car in the lot of a car body shop. Two pieces of tin were removed from the shop roof. |
| EF0 | Lakeway | Travis | TX | 30.3652°N 98.057°W | 14:15–14:18 | 3 mi (4.8 km) | 100 yd (91 m) | Several marinas were damaged as a small tornado crossed Lake Travis. Trees were damaged. |
| EF1 | E of Breaux Bridge | St. Martin | LA | 30.2676°N 91.8532°W | 14:47–14:49 | 0.8 mi (1.3 km) | 20 yd (18 m) | 2 deaths – A single-wide mobile home was rolled, separating the roofs and walls from the structure and killing two occupants. |
| EF0 | SW of Riverside | Walker | TX | 30.8242°N 95.4322°W | 17:25–17:27 | 0.5 mi (0.80 km) | 30 yd (27 m) | A barn was lifted and deposited across a road, and trees were damaged. |
| EF1 | Broaddus | San Augustine | TX | 31.2699°N 94.3315°W | 18:56–19:06 | 6.57 mi (10.57 km) | 310 yd (280 m) | A waterspout moved ashore, snapping and uprooting dozens of trees along its path and striking the town of Broaddus. A covered canopy between a church and another building in town collapsed. |
| EF1 | SW of Alexandria | Rapides | LA | 30.9925°N 92.5992°W | 19:32–19:46 | 7.29 mi (11.73 km) | 50 yd (46 m) | A few pine trees were snapped. |
| EF2 | W of Woodworth | Rapides | LA | 31.1255°N 92.5368°W | 19:50–19:59 | 6.11 mi (9.83 km) | 800 yd (730 m) | A large swath of trees was completely flattened in the Kisatchie National Forest. Falling trees also caused damage to four homes. |
| EF2 | NE of Fishville to SW of Jena | LaSalle | LA | 31.5788°N 92.2513°W | 19:53–20:04 | 5.55 mi (8.93 km) | 1,636 yd (1,496 m) | Several outbuildings lost siding, or sustained roof damage as a result of this large wedge tornado. An oil derrick was toppled over, with the metal severely bent, and a concrete anchor block was pulled out of the ground. A second rusty oil derrick was not only collapsed but broken into pieces as well. |
| EF1 | Western Alexandria | Rapides | LA | 31.2499°N 92.4821°W | 20:05–20:18 | 5.41 mi (8.71 km) | 500 yd (460 m) | This tornado moved through the western part of Alexandria, damaging numerous structures. A gas station awning was damaged, the side and doors of a large storage building were blown in, and numerous trees were snapped or downed. Some trees landed on homes, garages, and vehicles. Structures sustained minor roof damage to their shingles or soffit, while flat roofs were partially lifted off businesses. Flying debris broke windows, large billboards, and other signage. |
| EF1 | SSW of Florien | Sabine | LA | 31.3077°N 93.5838°W | 20:07–20:23 | 9.83 mi (15.82 km) | 370 yd (340 m) | Numerous trees were snapped or uprooted, much of the roof was ripped off a double-wide manufactured home, and an outbuilding was destroyed. |
| EF0 | W of Lena | Rapides | LA | 31.4595°N 92.7846°W | 20:20–20:21 | 0.1 mi (0.16 km) | 10 yd (9.1 m) | Storm chasers drove through a brief tornado which caused no significant damage. |
| EF2 | E of Fishville to Trout | LaSalle | LA | 31.5115°N 92.2521°W | 20:52–21:12 | 13.66 mi (21.98 km) | 2,252 yd (2,059 m) | A very large mile-wide wedge tornado hit the communities of Belah and Trout, causing considerable damage. Widespread damage occurred in Belah, with damage to the roofs of homes and a school building. Outbuildings were damaged or destroyed, many were trees blown over onto structures and vehicles, a metal truss tower was toppled over, and several power poles were broken into multiple pieces in the Belah area as well. In Trout, homes and trees sustained damage, while a boat business collapsed. Large swaths of heavily forested areas were completely flattened along the path, with every tree in the path snapped or uprooted in some areas. |
| EF1 | W of Georgetown | Grant, Winn | LA | 31.7815°N 92.5139°W | 20:54–20:57 | 4.1 mi (6.6 km) | 1,108 yd (1,013 m) | A large wedge tornado moved through the Kisatchie National Forest, snapping and uprooting trees along its path. |
| EF1 | NE of Montgomery | Grant, Winn | LA | 31.6917°N 92.8661°W | 21:12–21:23 | 4.43 mi (7.13 km) | 1,108 yd (1,013 m) | Numerous trees were snapped or uprooted, a truck and an RV were destroyed by fallen trees, and a house sustained roof damage. Several outbuildings were damaged, rolled, or destroyed. |
| EF1 | ESE of Columbia to WSW of Baskin | Caldwell, Franklin, Richland | LA | 32.0597°N 91.9371°W | 21:17–21:46 | 13.19 mi (21.23 km) | 1,232 yd (1,127 m) | This large wedge tornado snapped and uprooted many trees, and ripped tin roofing off of a house. |
| EF2 | N of Midway | LaSalle | LA | 31.7476°N 92.1618°W | 21:18–21:20 | 1.09 mi (1.75 km) | 440 yd (400 m) | Several homes sustained damage, mainly due to flying debris and falling trees, including a mobile home that was almost completely destroyed by falling trees. One well-constructed residence has its carport collapse atop two vehicles, while a second home was shifted 10 feet off of its pier and beam foundation. A third well-built brick home lost its roof entirely, and numerous power poles and trees were snapped. |
| EF2 | NE of Jena to NNW of Harrisonburg | LaSalle, Catahoula | LA | 31.7365°N 92.0389°W | 21:22–21:42 | 13.77 mi (22.16 km) | 880 yd (800 m) | This tornado struck the community of Aimwell. A few homes sustained roof damage, outbuildings were destroyed, a brick church sustained damage to its roof and walls, numerous large trees and many power poles were snapped, and a mobile home was flipped. Another mobile home lost its awning as well. One person was injured. |
| EF1 | SW of Mangham | Richland | LA | 32.2377°N 91.8523°W | 21:48–21:53 | 3.69 mi (5.94 km) | 300 yd (270 m) | A metal building was damaged, a fence was flattened, and numerous trees were snapped or uprooted. A home and a shed sustained minor roof damage. |
| EF1 | NW of Baskin | Richland, Franklin | LA | 32.2603°N 91.784°W | 21:49–21:59 | 4.77 mi (7.68 km) | 880 yd (800 m) | A power pole and several trees were snapped. One mobile home was destroyed while a second had its shingles ripped off. |
| EF2 | SE of Winnsboro | Franklin | LA | 32.087°N 91.6894°W | 22:09–22:22 | 5.83 mi (9.38 km) | 616 yd (563 m) | Numerous trees were snapped, power poles were broken, a small trailer was tossed, and a shed and a residence sustained minor roof damage. One small home built on blocks was completely destroyed, a horse trailer was flipped, and a mobile home was tossed 10 ft (3.3 yd). |
| EF0 | NE of Gilbert | Tensas, Madison | LA | 32.1898°N 91.4893°W | 22:41–22:44 | 1.4 mi (2.3 km) | 100 yd (91 m) | A few trees and limbs were snapped. |
| EF1 | W of Brookhaven to SSE of Wesson | Franklin, Lincoln | MS | 31.5727°N 90.6494°W | 05:57–06:22 | 17.48 mi (28.13 km) | 1,056 yd (966 m) | Trees were snapped or uprooted. Barns, mobile homes, and houses sustained minor roof or siding damage. At least six utility poles were snapped. |

=== April 3 event ===
List of confirmed tornadoes – Monday, April 3, 2017
| EF# | Location | County / Parish | State | Start Coord. | Time (UTC) | Path length | Max width | Summary |
|---|---|---|---|---|---|---|---|---|
| EF1 | NW of Madisonville | St. Tammany | LA | 30.44°N 90.21°W | 09:03–09:08 | 1.2 mi (1.9 km) | 50 yd (46 m) | Multiple pine trees were snapped, fences were flattened, garage doors sustained minor damage, and playground equipment was damaged. |
| EF1 | N of Covington | St. Tammany | LA | 30.5265°N 90.075°W | 09:14–09:19 | 1.76 mi (2.83 km) | 100 yd (91 m) | Numerous trees were downed, including one that fell on a home. Other structures sustained minor to moderate roof damage. |
| EF0 | Luverne | Crenshaw | AL | 31.7176°N 86.2619°W | 13:54–13:55 | 0.05 mi (0.080 km) | 25 yd (23 m) | A few homes in town sustained shingle damage, and a few homes were damaged by falling trees. An unanchored single-wide mobile home was pushed off its foundation and destroyed. Significant power line damage was observed as well. |
| EF1 | Western Carrollton | Carroll | GA | 33.5688°N 85.1141°W | 14:58–15:02 | 2.37 mi (3.81 km) | 300 yd (270 m) | A tornado touched down near the University of West Georgia, snapping and uprooting trees. A fire station had its styrofoam-metal roof pulled off, destroying a portion of the concrete exterior wall. |
| EF1 | Northern Chattahoochee Hills | Fulton | GA | 33.5678°N 84.7811°W | 15:28–15:37 | 4.07 mi (6.55 km) | 150 yd (140 m) | A tornado touched down intermittently as it moved through the northern part of Chattahoochee Hills, snapping or uprooting hundreds of trees. |
| EF1 | Columbus | Muscogee | GA | 32.4443°N 84.9555°W | 15:42–15:48 | 3.27 mi (5.26 km) | 175 yd (160 m) | Numerous trees were downed in Columbus, some of which landed on homes and cars. Many residences sustained either roof damage or had skirting blown away. An apartment complex had a substantial portion of its roof removed. |
| EF0 | SW of Lumpkin | Stewart | GA | 32.0336°N 84.8361°W | 16:10–16:12 | 1.56 mi (2.51 km) | 150 yd (140 m) | Stewart County High School had roofing material ripped off, causing water damage within the structure. Bleachers on an adjacent baseball field were overturned, sections of fencing were flattened, and trees were snapped. |
| EF0 | SW of Richland | Stewart | GA | 32.0692°N 84.7015°W | 16:16–16:18 | 1.35 mi (2.17 km) | 100 yd (91 m) | A small shed had roof panels ripped off, and a few trees were knocked down. |
| EF1 | E of Dahlonega | Lumpkin | GA | 34.4858°N 83.9252°W | 16:17–16:26 | 4.61 mi (7.42 km) | 350 yd (320 m) | Numerous trees were snapped or uprooted. Barns and sheds sustained significant damage, a home was damaged, and a large local chicken coop was collapsed. |
| EF0 | NE of Talbotton | Talbot | GA | 32.6956°N 84.5267°W | 16:18–16:22 | 2.23 mi (3.59 km) | 75 yd (69 m) | A few trees were snapped, and several trampolines were tossed. |
| EF1 | SW of Thomaston | Talbot | GA | 32.7458°N 84.4357°W | 16:26–16:32 | 3.65 mi (5.87 km) | 200 yd (180 m) | An old barn and a small shed were completely destroyed, and numerous large trees were snapped or uprooted. |
| EF0 | NW of Preston | Webster | GA | 32.1409°N 84.6112°W | 16:29–16:33 | 3.88 mi (6.24 km) | 150 yd (140 m) | Many trees were snapped or uprooted, including one that fell on a car. |
| EF0 | Northwestern Griffin | Spalding | GA | 33.2599°N 84.2874°W | 16:35–16:37 | 0.59 mi (0.95 km) | 150 yd (140 m) | A brief tornado touched down near the University of Georgia campus in Griffin, snapping or uprooting many trees. Some trees landed on homes and caused major structural damage. |
| EF0 | S of Thomaston | Upson | GA | 32.8198°N 84.3151°W | 16:36–16:39 | 1.74 mi (2.80 km) | 75 yd (69 m) | Some homes sustained minor roof damage. Several trees were snapped or uprooted. |
| EF1 | SE of Thomaston | Upson | GA | 32.843°N 84.2483°W | 16:44–16:52 | 6.67 mi (10.73 km) | 150 yd (140 m) | Numerous trees were snapped and uprooted. A church sustained minor damage. |
| EF1 | Ellaville | Schley | GA | 32.2295°N 84.3569°W | 16:46–16:56 | 5.48 mi (8.82 km) | 200 yd (180 m) | Dozens of trees were snapped and uprooted, and several homes sustained damage. One large metal building collapsed onto peanut storage bins while a second was caved in. Mobile homes were overturned. In total, over 40 homes were damaged (including 3 destroyed by fallen trees), 12 businesses sustained damage, and the whole city of Ellaville lost power for more than 24 hours. |
| EF0 | S of Locust Grove | Henry | GA | 33.3184°N 84.1156°W | 16:52–16:55 | 1.77 mi (2.85 km) | 250 yd (230 m) | Numerous shingles were ripped off one residence. Numerous trees were snapped or uprooted, of which one landed on and caused significant roof and exterior wall damage to a home. |
| EF1 | NNW of Bolingbroke | Monroe | GA | 32.9899°N 83.9028°W | 17:06–17:22 | 8.13 mi (13.08 km) | 300 yd (270 m) | Numerous homes sustained roof damage from wind or fallen trees. Trees also landed on cars and blocked highways. A small garage roof was damaged. In total, over 30 homes sustained damage, of which 9 were impacted severely and 1 was completely destroyed. |
| EF1 | Byron to Warner Robins | Peach, Houston | GA | 32.6576°N 83.7657°W | 17:30–17:45 | 9.23 mi (14.85 km) | 600 yd (550 m) | Trees were snapped or uprooted, some of which caused roof damage to homes. |
| EF0 | SE of Hillsboro | Jones | GA | 33.146°N 83.6046°W | 17:40–17:46 | 2.94 mi (4.73 km) | 100 yd (91 m) | One home sustained minor damage, and trees were snapped or uprooted. |
| EF1 | Central | Pickens | SC | 34.728°N 82.781°W | 17:51–17:52 | 0.09 mi (0.14 km) | 40 yd (37 m) | Dozens of trees were downed in Central as a result of this brief tornado embedded in straight-line winds. |
| EF1 | NE of Robins Air Force Base | Twiggs | GA | 32.6682°N 83.5264°W | 17:56–18:04 | 5.8 mi (9.3 km) | 440 yd (400 m) | Trees were snapped or uprooted. |
| EF2 | Gordon | Wilkinson | GA | 32.8592°N 83.3733°W | 18:03–18:13 | 3.26 mi (5.25 km) | 200 yd (180 m) | This tornado caused heavy damage to businesses in downtown Gordon. A food mart sustained collapse of its roof, and other nearby buildings sustained significant structural damage. A vehicle was totaled, and several trees were snapped as well. |
| EF1 | Southern Jeffersonville to NNE of Danville | Twiggs, Wilkinson | GA | 32.6758°N 83.3528°W | 18:06–18:18 | 7.91 mi (12.73 km) | 350 yd (320 m) | Tornado caused roof damage to a funeral home and moved several AC units off the roof to a side section; a few metal support cables to power poles were snapped as well. Several trees were snapped or uprooted, a residence had most of its shingles blown off, and part of a barn's metal roof was also blown off. |
| EF0 | SE of Oakfield | Worth | GA | 31.72°N 83.9°W | 18:10 | 0.01 mi (0.016 km) | 10 yd (9.1 m) | Video relayed by WALB-TV documented a tornado. |
| EF0 | Berea | Pickens, Greenville | SC | 34.859°N 82.507°W | 18:13–18:15 | 2.84 mi (4.57 km) | 50 yd (46 m) | Metal sheeting was ripped off the roofs of outbuildings on a farm, with a nearby house sustaining shingle damage. Trees were downed in and to the west of Berea. |
| EF0 | N of McIntyre | Wilkinson | GA | 32.8899°N 83.2291°W | 18:16–18:23 | 4.11 mi (6.61 km) | 90 yd (82 m) | A residence sustained minor roof damage, and trees were snapped. |
| EF0 | WNW of Sparta | Hancock | GA | 33.2938°N 83.1208°W | 18:21–18:25 | 3.26 mi (5.25 km) | 200 yd (180 m) | Numerous trees were snapped or uprooted and a small shed was destroyed. |
| EF0 | N of Montrose to NNE of Dudley | Wilkinson, Laurens | GA | 32.667°N 83.124°W | 18:26–18:39 | 6.57 mi (10.57 km) | 150 yd (140 m) | Several trees were snapped or uprooted. |
| EF1 | S of Toomsboro | Wilkinson | GA | 32.775°N 83.0829°W | 18:28–18:30 | 0.17 mi (0.27 km) | 100 yd (91 m) | A single-wide trailer was shifted off its foundation, while a second trailer sustained shingle loss and a collapse of its carport. Trees were snapped. |
| EF1 | SW of Sandersville | Washington | GA | 32.9203°N 82.9996°W | 18:36–18:41 | 5.72 mi (9.21 km) | 250 yd (230 m) | A church and a residence sustained roof damage, and numerous large trees were snapped or uprooted. |
| EF0 | NW of Laurens | Laurens | SC | 34.554°N 82.07°W | 18:49–18:50 | 0.74 mi (1.19 km) | 75 yd (69 m) | Trees were damaged, and minor structural damage was observed. |
| EF0 | NE of Sandersville | Washington | GA | 33.0514°N 82.7538°W | 18:56–18:58 | 0.39 mi (0.63 km) | 150 yd (140 m) | Numerous trees were snapped and uprooted. |
| EF1 | S of Edge Hill | Washington, Jefferson | GA | 33.0454°N 82.6641°W | 19:00–19:10 | 7.52 mi (12.10 km) | 300 yd (270 m) | A large barn sustained damage to its metal roof, a barn was demolished, and numerous trees were snapped or uprooted. A home and a shed sustained minor damage as well. |
| EF1 | N of Whitmire | Union | SC | 34.582°N 81.606°W | 19:21–19:23 | 0.74 mi (1.19 km) | 150 yd (140 m) | 1 death – A mobile home was overturned and rolled off its frame, killing one person inside. |
| EF0 | NW of Carlisle | Union | SC | 34.62°N 81.49°W | 19:30 | 0.01 mi (0.016 km) | 50 yd (46 m) | A few trees were knocked down. |
| EF0 | Aiken | Aiken | SC | 33.53°N 81.74°W | 20:08–20:09 | 0.06 mi (0.097 km) | 25 yd (23 m) | Several trees were downed in multiple directions by this brief tornado. |
| EF1 | S of Monetta | Aiken | SC | 33.801°N 81.62°W | 20:14–20:16 | 0.87 mi (1.40 km) | 100 yd (91 m) | Numerous pine trees were snapped. |
| EF0 | E of Gifford | Hampton | SC | 32.86°N 81.19°W | 20:43–20:44 | 0.28 mi (0.45 km) | 240 yd (220 m) | Small trees were uprooted by this brief tornado. |
| EF2 | N of Cameron | Calhoun | SC | 33.59°N 80.787°W | 21:11–21:22 | 6.72 mi (10.81 km) | 600 yd (550 m) | A row of power poles were snapped near their base. Several barns and large metal storage buildings were heavily damaged, with their anchors removed from the ground. Homes sustained roof damage, numerous trees were snapped or uprooted, and a pivot tilt irrigation system was overturned. |

== Aftermath ==
=== Casualties ===
On April 2, a mother and daughter near Breaux Bridge, Louisiana were killed after their mobile home was blown off of its foundation and rolled over by an EF1 tornado about forty minutes after the start of the outbreak. The home's walls and roof were separated from the frame from the force of an estimated 110 mph winds. At 4:30 PM, one person was injured after an EF2 tornado with estimated 115 mph winds passed west of Harrisonburg, Louisiana. Another EF2 tornado with similar windspeed injured two near Gilbert, Louisiana about an hour later, with an additional injury occurring after a car sustained damage from a fallen tree.

The next day, on April 3, a mobile home was torn off of its frame and flipped onto an intersection north of Whitmire, South Carolina by an EF1, killing an occupant at around 3:20 PM EDT. The same day, minor injuries were sustained by two people after a tornado overturned a dock and damaged a boat southeast of Lincolnton, Georgia. An additional injury occurred earlier that day after a tree fell on a home near Ellaville, Georgia following an EF1 tornado at around 12:50 PM EDT.

=== Damage ===
Estimates place the total damage caused by the outbreak in Louisiana at $4.2 million. Many tornadoes caused significant damage to trees, and structural damage up to EF2-level was observed at multiple locations including Gordon, Georgia and near Cameron, South Carolina.

=== Surveying ===
Complicating post-event analysis, the outbreak was followed closely by another severe weather event on April 5, 2017, which made it more difficult for National Weather Service teams to distinguish and survey individual tornado tracks from the tornadoes that occurred on April 3.
