= The Warner Robins Patriot =

- Owner(s): Georgia Eagle Media, Inc.
- Publisher: Cecil Staton
- Editor: David Cranshaw
- Founded: August 2009
- Language: English
- Headquarters: 1350 Radio Loop; Warner Robins, Georgia 31088
- Website: http://warnerrobinspatriot.com/

The Warner Robins Patriot is a newspaper in Warner Robins, Georgia. It is published each day on the Internet and in print on Wednesdays, and distributed by subscription and free distribution to approximately 20,000 households in Warner Robins and Centerville.

The paper was established in August 2009, by Georgia Eagle Media, Inc., owner of 15 radio stations in Georgia including WNNG 1350 AM, WDXQ-FM 107.5 FM, and WNNG-FM ESPN 99.9 FM. The paper was launched with support of local business, civic, and politic leaders who were frustrated at the fact that Warner Robins, now the 8th largest city in Georgia, lacked its own newspaper. For many years Warner Robins had a local paper, The Sun, which was purchased by the Macon newspaper The Telegraph and reduced to a once a week section in the paper several years ago.

Cecil Staton, president of Georgia Eagle, serves as publisher of the paper.

In November, 2009, in anticipation of future growth, Georgia Eagle broke ground for a news building addition that will house the paper staff.
