= WYPZ =

WYPZ may refer to:

- WYPZ (AM), a radio station (900 AM) licensed to serve Macon, Georgia, United States
- WBML, a radio station (1350 AM) licensed to serve Warner Robins, Georgia, which held the call sign WYPZ in 2015
- WRWR (FM), a radio station (107.5 FM) licensed to serve Cochran, Georgia, which held the call sign WYPZ from 2013 to 2015
