= WRWR =

WRWR may refer to:

- WRWR (FM), a radio station (107.5 FM) licensed to Cochran, Georgia, United States
- WBML, a radio station (1350 AM) licensed to Warner Robins, Georgia, which held the call sign WRWR from 2010 to 2015
- WMUB-LD, a TV station (channel 38) licensed to Warner Robins, Georgia, which held the call sign WRWR-LD from 2010 to 2014
