= WNNG =

WNNG may refer to:

- WNNG-FM, a radio station (99.9 FM) licensed to Unadilla, Georgia, United States
- WBML, a radio station (1350 AM) licensed to Warner Robins, Georgia, United States, which held the call sign WNNG from 2001 to 2010
