= WMDG =

- East Point, Georgia; United States
- Broadcast area: Atlanta metropolitan area
- Frequency: 1260 kHz
- Branding: Fox FM

Programming
- Format: Classic hits leaning Classic rock
- Affiliations: Compass Media Networks; United Stations Radio Networks

Ownership
- Owner: Christopher Murray; (Georgia Radio Alliance Atlanta, LLC)
- Sister stations: WBAF, WEKS, WFDR

History
- First air date: September 21, 1961
- Former call signs: WKRW (1961–1981); WYXC (1981–2017)
- Former frequencies: 1270 kHz (1961–2018)

Technical information
- Licensing authority: FCC
- Facility ID: 19541
- Class: D
- Power: 5,100 watts day 52 watts night
- Transmitter coordinates: 33°41′47.00″N 84°28′29.00″W
- Translators: 99.3 W257DF (Tyrone); 100.1 W261DL (East Point); 102.1 W271CV (Atlanta); 100.9 W265AV (Woodstock)

Links
- Public license information: Public file; LMS
- Webcast: Listen Live
- Website: myfoxfm.com

WMDG (1260 AM; "Fox FM") is a radio station broadcasting a classic hits format. Licensed to East Point, Georgia, the station serves the Atlanta metropolitan area.

The station is owned by Christopher Murray’s Georgia Radio Alliance Atlanta, LLC.

As of August 30, 2022, WMDG is now a part of the classic hits formatted "Fox FM" network of stations across Georgia owned by the Georgia Radio Alliance. "Fox FM" is programmed by former WSTR "Star 94" midday host Kevin Steele. Local personalities on the "Fox FM" network of stations include Tom Sullivan and Dave 'Cappy' Caprita whom together host mornings, Jeremy 'Hawk' Hawkins who hosts afternoons and also serves as Fox FM's voice-over talent, and J.J. Jackson who hosts the Totally '80s Friday Night Show. Syndicated programming on "Fox FM" includes Time Warp with Bill St. James.

WMDG, as well as translators W257DF/99.3, W261DL/100.1, W271CV/102.1, and W265AV/100.9 are the main stations of the Atlanta "Fox" network of stations owned by Georgia Radio Alliance. Simulcasters of WMDG include WFDR 1370 AM along with an FM translator on 97.3 in Manchester, Georgia, and WBAF 1090 AM along with an FM translator on 104.9 in Barnesville, Georgia. A localized "Fox" network of stations also exists in Macon, Georgia with WFXM-HD3/W234CQ 94.7 being the main station of that network. Macon's "Fox" is also simulcasted in Warner Robins on WBML 1350/95.5 W238CG. Macon's "Fox" programming and music is identical to Atlanta aside from stopsets and imaging.

== History ==
=== AM 1260 East Point ===
A station first signed on in 1949 in East Point as 1260 WTJH. It was a 1,000-watt daytimer, and required to go off the air at sunset to protect existing stations already on AM 1260. It was owned by James and Doris Rivers, with James serving as the company president. By 1970, its daytime-only power output had been boosted to 5,000 watts.

By 2000, it was owned by Wilkes Broadcasting and aired a Christian talk and teaching format.

=== AM 1270 Cartersville ===
Another station, this one on AM 1270 in Cartersville, Georgia, signed on the air on September 21, 1961. WKRW was also a daytimer, transmitting with 500 watts, & was owned by the Bartow County Broadcasting Company. It later changed its call sign to WYXC.

On December 7, 2009, WYXC experienced a "catastrophic equipment failure" involving the station's automation system. After evaluating the costs of repairing or replacing the equipment, the station's owners decided to close down the station, as they could not afford the cost of repairs.

=== Major Damage ===
On December 21, 2012, WYXC went under new ownership with John and Brandi Underwood along with partner Greg Detscher, forming the NewsTalk Corporation. In June 2014, NewsTalk Corp. defaulted on the lease with Clarion Communications. Intruders vandalized the station causing major damage. Clarion Communications took over operation of the station, and spent many hours in engineering expenses getting the damage repaired. The station returned to the air under the "Fox News & Sports" logo.

Effective June 3, 2016, Clarion Communications sold WYXC to Anthony D. St. Cyr for $1.

Michael and Dara Glinter’s Northwest Georgia Broadcasting filed an $180,000 deal to buy WYXC from Anthony St. Cyr. Northwest Georgia Broadcasting doesn’t own any other stations. Pensacola-based Michael and Dara Glinter previously attempted to buy the now-defunct WTJH 1260 in the Atlanta metro but the Federal Communications Commission (FCC) deleted the station’s license after it remained off the air for too long. Meanwhile, WYXC remained off the air pending its sale and relocation. The purchase by Northwest Georgia Broadcasting was consummated on December 1, 2016. On May 2, 2017, the station changed its call sign to WMDG.

=== Restoring the Station ===
Effective October 3, 2018, WMDG was issued a construction permit by the FCC to move its city of license from Cartersville to East Point, to move from 1270 AM to 1260 AM, and to both increase its daytime power and decrease its nighttime power. The new station would replace WTJH, the defunct station that had broadcast from East Point on AM 1260.

The station is once again on the air featuring a Christian format; much of its programming is relayed from KGMS in Tucson, Arizona.

In 2022, Christopher Murray's Georgia Radio Alliance Atlanta acquired WMDG from Northwest Georgia Broadcasting.
