= WBAF =

Radio station in Barnesville, Georgia, United States

- Barnesville, Georgia; United States
- Broadcast area: Barnesville, Georgia
- Frequency: 1090 kHz
- Branding: Fox FM

Programming
- Format: Classic hits

Ownership
- Owner: Christopher Murray; (Georgia Radio Alliance, LLC.)
- Sister stations: WEKS, WFDR, WMDG

History
- First air date: July 23, 1966

Technical information
- Licensing authority: FCC
- Facility ID: 3973
- Class: D
- Power: 1,000 watts day
- Transmitter coordinates: 33°3′13.00″N 84°8′7.00″W
- Translator: 104.9 W285FK (Barnesville)

Links
- Public license information: Public file; LMS
- Webcast: Listen Live
- Website: myfoxfm.com

WBAF (1090 AM) is a radio station broadcasting a classic hits format. Licensed to Barnesville, Georgia, United States, the station is currently owned by Christopher Murray's Georgia Radio Alliance, LLC.

In or around 2019, Christopher Murray's Georgia Radio Alliance acquired WBAF and flipped it to "Fox FM" with a Classic Hits format resembling its Macon/Warner Robins area sister station WBML. "Fox FM" is programmed by former WSTR "Star 94" midday host Kevin Steele; Steele also hosts mornings on "Fox FM." Aside from Steele, other local personalities on the station include Tom Sullivan; who hosts middays as well as the Totally 80s Friday Night Show, and Jeremy "Hawk" Hawkins, who hosts afternoons; Hawkins also serves as Fox FM's voice-over talent. Syndicated programming on Fox FM includes Daily Dees hosted by Rick Dees in middays and Scott Shannon Presents America's Greatest Hits on weekends.
