= WYPZ (AM) =

- Macon, Georgia; United States
- Broadcast area: Macon area
- Frequency: 900 kHz
- Branding: Praise 99.5

Programming
- Format: Urban gospel

Ownership
- Owner: Christopher Murray; (Georgia Radio Alliance, LLC)
- Sister stations: WBML; WFXM; WRWR

History
- First air date: November 25, 1957
- Former call signs: WCRY (1958–1977); WDDO (1977–1978); WBML (1978–2015)

Technical information
- Licensing authority: FCC
- Facility ID: 71216
- Class: D
- Power: 2,000 watts day; 145 watts night
- Transmitter coordinates: 32°50′58.5″N 83°36′7.6″W
- Translator: 99.5 W258AP (Macon)
- Repeater: 107.1 WFXM-HD3 (Gordon)

Links
- Public license information: Public file; LMS
- Webcast: Listen live
- Website: www.praise995.com

WYPZ (900 kHz) is an AM radio station broadcasting an urban gospel format. Licensed to Macon, Georgia, US, the station serves the Macon metropolitan area.

The station went on the air as WCRY on November 25, 1957. It was owned by William H. Loudermilk and initially had a format aimed at Black listeners. The call sign was changed to WDDO in 1977, when WCRY was forced to stop simulcasting with WCRY-FM. It then exchanged frequencies and licenses with country music station WBML (1240 AM) in 1978, resulting in WBML being heard on 900 and WDDO's format and call sign moving to 1240.

After years as a Christian radio station, WBML was sold to Sun Broadcasting in June 2011 and began programming a classic/mainstream country format in July 2011.

For a short period of time in 2015, WBML simulcast WRWR/W286CE's R&B format before moving WYPZ (1350 AM)'s callsign and urban gospel format to 900 AM later that year to make way for classic hits formatted "Fox FM" on 1350 AM. With this change, the now-historic WBML call sign was moved to 1350 AM.

== History ==
=== WCRY ===
The station now known as WYPZ originated as WCRY, a daytime-only AM station on 900 kHz in Macon. William H. Loudermilk applied in 1956 for a new standard broadcast station on 900 kc with 250 watts of power, daytime only. The Federal Communications Commission granted the construction permit on May 1, 1957, and later approved a modification moving the studio and transmitter site to the intersection of Cowan and Glenn streets in Macon. The license to cover the construction permit was granted on April 8, 1958. The WCRY call letters were assigned to Loudermilk's new 900 kc station in 1957.

Loudermilk sold WCRY to W. H. Keller Jr. in 1958 for $27,500. Keller was also majority stockholder of WGOV in Valdosta, Georgia. The FCC granted the assignment on September 3, 1958, and the transfer became effective September 16.

In 1961, WCRY was assigned to Middle Georgia Broadcasting Company. The FCC granted the assignment and renewal on October 25, 1961. Early the next year, the station's license was modified to change the studio location to 555 Mulberry Street in Macon and to permit remote control of the transmitter from the studio. Middle Georgia Broadcasting's ownership shifted several times during the 1960s. In 1964, the FCC approved the transfer of negative control from Peachtree Development Corporation and Zack D. Cravey Jr. to Charles F. Adams. In 1965, the FCC approved John J. Wheeler's relinquishment of negative control through the sale of stock to Billy R. Mercer and Ben G. Porter Jr., who were described in Broadcasting as WCRY announcers and salesmen. Porter later acquired negative control in 1967.

WCRY was among Georgia stations listed in a 1959 U.S. Radio survey of stations airing programming for Black audiences; the listing reported 72 weekly hours of such programming for WCRY in Macon. In 1972, Middle Georgia Broadcasting received the WCRY-FM call letters for a new FM companion station in Macon. WCRY-FM was licensed in 1973 with 100,000 watts effective radiated power.

=== WDDO and the WBML exchange ===
The 900 AM station changed from WCRY to WDDO in the late 1970s. National Radio Club call-letter records listed "900 WDDO-GA ex WCRY". A WCRY-FM verification letter from the period identified the AM sister station as WDDO and described it as "Disco".

In 1978, the FCC history cards show a paired transaction in which the WDDO/WCRY 900 facility was assigned to Network, Inc. The card notes that the assignment was mutually contingent on the grant of an assignment involving WBML, which had been operating on 1240 kHz in Macon. The FCC card for the 900 kHz facility shows WBML effective August 23, 1978, placing the WBML call sign on 900 kHz. In 1979, the FCC approved a further assignment of the 900 kHz license to WBML, Inc.

=== WBML ===
After the 1978 exchange, the 900 kHz facility operated for decades as WBML. David A. Rodgers was identified in 1980s trade reports as the owner of WBML in Macon. By 1989, the station was listed in the Directory of Religious Broadcasting as WBML 900 AM in Macon, with David A. Rodgers listed and the station address given as 735 Reese Street.

WBML remained associated with Rodgers into the 1990s; a 1997 group-ownership listing identified David Rodgers as president and included WBML among his stations.

In 2011, WBML Inc., headed by David A. Rodgers, sold WBML to Sun Broadcasting Inc., headed by Daniel F. Evans, for $50,000. The sale included a time brokerage agreement that began June 17, 2011. FCC broadcast actions later listed Sun Broadcasting, Inc. as licensee of WBML in connection with the station's 2012 license renewal grant.

=== WYPZ and Praise 99.5 ===
The station changed call signs from WBML to WYPZ on October 5, 2015. The FCC's November 2015 Media Bureau call-sign actions public notice lists WYPZ as assigned to Sun Broadcasting, Inc. in Macon, Georgia, with former call sign WBML. The same notice shows the WBML call sign assigned the same day to an AM station in Warner Robins, Georgia, whose former call sign was WYPZ. Radio World also reported the October 2015 Georgia call-sign changes, noting that Sun Broadcasting's Macon AM station WBML changed its name to WYPZ.

The FCC public inspection file identifies WYPZ as Facility ID 71216, licensed to Macon, Georgia, with Macon Urban Radio Alliance, LLC as licensee. Radio-Locator lists WYPZ as operating on 900 kHz with 2,000 watts daytime and 145 watts nighttime, using a non-directional antenna pattern.
