= WFXM =

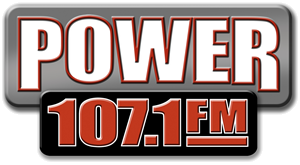

- Gordon, Georgia; United States
- Broadcast area: Macon and Vicinity
- Frequency: 107.1 MHz (HD Radio)
- Branding: Power 107.1

Programming
- Format: Mainstream urban
- Subchannels: HD2: Urban adult contemporary (WRWR simulcast); HD3: Urban gospel (WYPZ simulcast); HD4: Classic hits (WBML simulcast)

Ownership
- Owner: Christopher Murray; (Georgia Radio Alliance, LLC.)
- Sister stations: WBML; WRWR; WYPZ

History
- First air date: 1976
- Former call signs: WKOG-FM (1974–1979); WIZY-FM (1979–1984); WQXM-FM (1984–1990); WYGO (1990); WYGO-FM (1990); WMRW (1990–1992); WNEX-FM (1992–1994); WQXM-FM (1994); WALJ (1994–2000)
- Call sign meaning: "Foxie Macon" (after old branding)

Technical information
- Licensing authority: FCC
- Facility ID: 25387
- Class: A
- ERP: 3,000 watts
- HAAT: 142 meters (466 ft)
- Transmitter coordinates: 32°50′56″N 83°28′29″W
- Translator: HD4: 94.7 W234CQ (Macon)

Links
- Public license information: Public file; LMS
- Webcast: Listen live
- Website: www.power1071macon.com

WFXM (107.1 FM) is a radio station serving the Macon, Georgia, area with a mainstream urban format. This station is licensed to Georgia Radio Alliance, LLC.

== History ==
The station began operation as WKOG-FM. The FCC authorized WKOG-FM in Gordon to begin program operation on 107.1 MHz on March 30, 1976, with an effective radiated power of 3 kW and an antenna height above average terrain of 98 feet. The FCC granted the license covering the new FM station the following year.

The station went through several call-letter changes in its early decades. In 1979, Broadcasting listed an application to change WKOG-FM's call sign to WIZY-FM. In 1984, Broadcasting listed WQXM-FM as the new call sign sought by WIZY-FM. In 1990, FMedia! listed the Gordon station on 107.1 as WYGO, formerly WQXM-FM, and later as WMRW, formerly WYGO-FM.

In late 1991, The M Street Journal reported that WMRW, then listed with an adult contemporary/jazz format, would become WNEX-FM with a contemporary hit radio format in January 1992. Broadcasting confirmed the WNEX-FM call letters in 1992, listing the change from WMRW and identifying Quality Broadcasting Inc. as the licensee.

The station briefly returned to the WQXM-FM call sign in 1994, with FMedia! listing WQXM-FM as formerly WNEX-FM. By 1997, the station was operating as WALJ. That year, The M Street Journal reported that WALJ had changed from smooth jazz to urban adult contemporary and had entered a local marketing agreement with intent to purchase with Roberts Communications, Inc.

The WFXM call letters moved to 107.1 in 2000. The M Street Journal reported paired call-letter changes in which WFXM-FM on 100.1 in Forsyth became WQMJ, while WALJ on 107.1 in Gordon became WFXM-FM on March 20, 2000. The station was then using the "Foxy 107" branding. The station would later flip to its current hip-hop format under the Power 107.1 branding.

== Notable DJ ==
- Rob Redding
