= WFDR (AM) =

- Manchester, Georgia; United States
- Broadcast area: Atlanta Southside area
- Frequency: 1370 kHz
- Branding: Fox FM

Programming
- Format: Classic hits
- Affiliations: Compass Media Networks; United Stations Radio Networks

Ownership
- Owner: Christopher Murray; (Georgia Radio Alliance, LLC.)
- Sister stations: WBAF, WEKS, WMDG

History
- First air date: June 1957
- Call sign meaning: Franklin Delano Roosevelt

Technical information
- Licensing authority: FCC
- Facility ID: 53678
- Class: D
- Power: 2,300 watts day 28 watts night
- Transmitter coordinates: 32.887222°N 84.59833°W
- Translator: 97.3 W247CJ (Manchester)

Links
- Public license information: Public file; LMS
- Webcast: Listen Live
- Website: myfoxfm.com

WFDR (1370 kHz) is an AM radio station broadcasting a classic hits format. It is licensed to serve Manchester, Georgia, United States, south-southwest of metro Atlanta. The station is currently owned by Legacy Media Holdings, LLC.

The stations' call letters WFDR are a reference to former U.S. President Franklin D. Roosevelt, who had his Little White House vacation home in nearby Warm Springs, Georgia.

As of September 12, 2016, WFDR is being relayed on FM translator W247CJ at 97.3 MHz.

In or around 2019, Christopher Murray's Georgia Radio Alliance acquired WFDR and flipped it to "Fox FM" with a Classic Hits format resembling its Macon/Warner Robins area sister station WBML. In January 2021, WFDR began simulcasting on 102.1 W271CV in Atlanta via 96.1 WWPW-HD4.
