= WEKS =

- Zebulon, Georgia; United States
- Broadcast area: Atlanta Southside area (Fayetteville-Newnan)
- Frequency: 92.5 MHz
- RDS: PI: A64E; PS: ARTIST TITLE THE BEAR; RT: Artist - Title
- Branding: The Bear 92.5

Programming
- Format: Country music
- Affiliations: Compass Media Networks

Ownership
- Owner: Legacy Media - South Atlanta, LLC.
- Sister stations: WBAF; WFDR; WMDG

History
- First air date: 1995

Technical information
- Licensing authority: FCC
- Facility ID: 61617
- Class: C3
- ERP: 12,000 watts
- HAAT: 145 meters (476 ft)
- Transmitter coordinates: 33°8′20″N 84°31′31″W

Links
- Public license information: Public file; LMS
- Webcast: Listen live
- Website: thebear925.com

WEKS (92.5 FM; "The Bear 92.5") is a radio station broadcasting a country music format. Licensed to Zebulon, Georgia, with studios in downtown Fayetteville, Georgia, United States. The station is owned by Legacy Media - South Atlanta, LLC. The Georgia Radio Alliance also owns the classic hits formatted "Fox FM" stations WBAF, WFDR, and WMDG. WEKS features live and local country music programming, custom designed for the Southside of Atlanta, Georgia.

WEKS currently features a locally programmed country music format branded as "The Bear 92.5.". Personalities on WEKS include Chris East, and Cal Cross in the morning, and Kevin Steele in the afternoon. The station also airs nationally syndicated programming like the Dee Jay Silver & The Country Club mixshow Friday nights, The Original Country Gold with Rowdy Yates show Saturday nights, and Honky Tonkin’ with Tracy Lawrence Sunday nights. WEKS also has a Gospel show that airs Sunday mornings hosted by Dustin Fordham.

While WEKS is licensed to broadcast in HD Radio, the station has yet to sign on an HD signal.

WEKS uses PlayoutOne for its automation system, a Wheatstone Audioarts AIR-4 12 Channel Mixer, an Orban Optimod 8400 for audio processing, and a GatesAir 20 kW transmitter with 2 ERI bays.

== History ==
The station originated in an FCC allocation proceeding. At the request of Hogan Broadcasting System, the Federal Communications Commission (FCC) allotted Channel 223A (92.5 MHz) to Zebulon as the community's first local radio service. The allotment took effect on March 16, 1990, with an application window from March 19 through April 18; it carried a site restriction 1.1 kilometers (0.7 mile) south of Zebulon to avoid short-spacing Atlanta station WZGC.

Three mutually exclusive applications were filed by Stephen D. Tarkenton, Taylor Broadcasting, L.P., and South Central Broadcasting Company. In September 1991, an FCC administrative law judge approved a settlement under which the Tarkenton and South Central proposals were combined as Spalding Broadcasting, L.P., with Tarkenton as its sole general partner, and selected the Spalding application. The commission denied an attempt by Design Media Inc. to reopen the proceeding in September 1992, finding that the company lacked party status and had not submitted sufficient evidence for its allegation that Tarkenton's father, Dallas Tarkenton, was an undisclosed real party in interest. The FCC issued the construction permit for facility 61617 on February 25, 1993, and assigned the call sign WEKS effective March 29.

Spalding filed the station's initial license-to-cover application on February 28, 1995. The M Street Journal listed license-to-cover activity for the new station on March 29, and its April 5 issue reported that the new WEKS had adopted a country format and the name "The Bear". The FCC granted the first broadcast license on July 5, 1995. In September, M Street reported that WEKS had added Jones Satellite Networks' "CD Country" programming service. The 1996 M Street Radio Directory listed the station with 6,000 watts, offices and studios at 1523 Kell Lane in Griffin, and Les Reed as general manager and program director.

On September 30, 1998, the FCC approved assignment of the license from Spalding Broadcasting, L.P., to Spalding Broadcasting, Inc. Spalding applied in March 2005 to upgrade WEKS from Class A to Class C3 and relocate its transmitter; the FCC granted the construction permit on June 14. A subsequent modification specified 12,000 watts from a new site near Gay, Georgia, and an FCC public notice recorded an engineering amendment to the project in January 2006. The antenna-structure record gives May 21, 2006, as the tower's construction date. Spalding filed to license the upgraded facility on July 14, and the FCC granted that license on September 13.

In April 2007, BIA Financial Networks reported an agreement under which Legacy Media Holdings LLC, led by Michael Easterly, would acquire WEKS from Spalding Broadcasting for $3.4 million; the report identified Stephen Tarkenton as president of the seller. The FCC assignment application had been filed on March 12 and was granted on May 3, with Legacy Media–South Atlanta LLC named as the assignee of the license. In a June 29 announcement, Joe Pedicino said the sale had closed that day, that Legacy would assume operations on July 1, and that a more locally presented schedule would begin July 9 while retaining the country format and "The Bear" name. His announced weekday lineup included Moby with Chris East in mornings, Wanda Elise in middays, Uncle Rich in afternoons, and Scott Sargeant and Charlie Filkins' High Octane Radio in evenings, along with local news, weather and traffic and a NASCAR program.

In April 2009, the Fayette Daily News reported that WEKS and the Fayette County Humane Society organized the first "Bear Country Can & Bag-A-Thon", which collected pet food and donations for abandoned and stray animals. By the station's December 2011 license-renewal filing, Legacy Media–South Atlanta gave its address as 42 Main Street in Senoia and identified Pedicino as chief executive officer and general manager.

On March 6, 2017, the station announced in a video that it had begun broadcasting live from Fayetteville. The studio change did not alter the licensed facility: WEKS's 2020 renewal filing continued to identify Legacy Media–South Atlanta as licensee of facility 61617 at Zebulon, while giving Fayetteville as the applicant's address.

In November 2021, the trade publication Radio Ink described WEKS as an outlet of Georgia Radio Alliance and identified Chris Murray as the organization's president and chief executive officer. It also reported that longtime Atlanta country-radio personality William "Cadillac Jack" Choate would join WEKS on November 8 after two years away from radio. A 2025 Radio Ink retrospective reported that Choate had left WEKS in 2024. In material available in August 2026, the station's website continued to use "The Bear 92.5" identity and the slogan "The Southside's Best Country"; its footer identified Georgia Radio Alliance, while its contest rules separately named Legacy Media–South Atlanta LLC as the owner and operator of WEKS-FM and gave the Fayetteville address.
