= WNNG-FM =

- Unadilla, Georgia; United States
- Frequency: 99.9 MHz

Programming
- Format: Christian talk and teaching
- Affiliations: Radio

Ownership
- Owner: Augusta Radio Fellowship Institute

History
- Former call signs: WAFI (1993–2001); WCOP-FM (2001–2005); WQSA (2006–2008)

Technical information
- Licensing authority: FCC
- Facility ID: 15309
- Class: A
- ERP: 6,000 watts
- HAAT: 100 meters
- Transmitter coordinates: 32°18′29.00″N 83°46′30.00″W

Links
- Public license information: Public file; LMS

WNNG-FM 99.9 is an FM Christian radio station in Warner Robins, Georgia. It now operates under a Christian talk and teaching format, as "WNNG 99.9". The station shares studio space and offices with WMUB-LD TV 38, WBML and WRWR, and an online newspaper in Warner Robins, where it first started in the mid 1990s as Christian FM station WAFI, later WCOP-FM, owned by Toccoa Falls College. The call letters were once on an AM station in Sarasota, Florida.

In March 2017, it was announced that Augusta Radio Fellowship Institute had purchased WNNG-FM from Georgia Eagle Media for $330,000. Shortly thereafter, the station changed formats to its current Christian format.
