= Kampville, Missouri =

Unincorporated community in Missouri, U.S.

Coordinates: 38°51′09″N 90°32′45″W

Kampville is an unincorporated community in St. Charles County, in the U.S. state of Missouri.

The community has the name of the local Kamp family.
