= Fishville, Louisiana =

- Unincorporated community
- Location within Louisiana Location within the United States
- Coordinates: 31°31′18″N 92°21′43″W
- Country: United States
- State: Louisiana
- Parish: Grant
- Elevation: 82 ft (25 m)
- Time zone: UTC-6 (Central (CST))
  - Summer (DST): UTC-5 (CDT)
- Area code: 318
- GNIS feature ID: 554416

Fishville (French: Poissonville) is an unincorporated community in Grant Parish, Louisiana, United States.
