= Hillsboro, Georgia =

- Unincorporated community
- Location within Georgia Location within the United States
- Coordinates: 33°10′47″N 83°38′28″W
- Country: United States
- State: Georgia
- County: Jasper
- Elevation: 646 ft (197 m)
- Time zone: UTC-5 (Eastern (EST))
  - Summer (DST): UTC-4 (EDT)
- ZIP code: 31038
- Area codes: 706 & 762
- GNIS feature ID: 356309

Hillsboro is an unincorporated community in Jasper County, Georgia, United States, established around 1795.

== Location and history ==
The community of Hillsboro is located on Georgia State Route 11 (formerly the Macon to Athens Road) 9 miles (14 km) south of the county seat of Monticello.

=== Early years ===
The community was established around 1795 and named after John and Isaac Hill, pioneer settlers, and originally spelled Hillsborough. It was the county seat of Baldwin County briefly in 1806 before the county was divided into Jasper and other counties. It is the birthplace of Benjamin Harvey Hill, a United States and later Confederate States Senator.

=== Civil War ===
During the American Civil War, Hillsboro was in the path of Sherman's March to the Sea and suffered damage and plundering from Federal troops. The community was sacked a second time, when cavalry under Major General George Stoneman passed through on their way to Macon, where Stoneman was subsequently captured by the Confederate Army troops.

=== 20th Century and beyond ===
By the early years of the 20th century, Hillsboro was described as "a thriving and prosperous community" with a number of stores, churches, and shops. There was also a bank and a two-story school house. By the later years of the century, in the wake of declining enrollment and school district consolidation, the old school house was converted to a community center.

Hillsboro has a post office with ZIP code 31038.

== See also ==
List of county seats in Georgia (U.S. state)
