= Berea, South Carolina =

- CDP
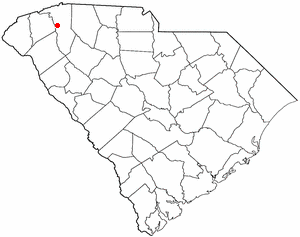
- Location of Berea, South Carolina
- Coordinates: 34°52′28″N 82°27′57″W
- Country: United States
- State: South Carolina
- County: Greenville

Area
  - Total: 7.93 sq mi (20.53 km^{2})
  - Land: 7.70 sq mi (19.94 km^{2})
  - Water: 0.23 sq mi (0.59 km^{2})
- Elevation: 1,060 ft (320 m)

Population (2020)
  - Total: 15,578
  - Density: 2,023.7/sq mi (781.36/km^{2})
- Time zone: UTC−5 (Eastern (EST))
  - Summer (DST): UTC−4 (EDT)
- Zip code: 29617
- FIPS code: 45-05770
- GNIS feature ID: 2402684

Berea is a census-designated place (CDP) in Greenville County, South Carolina, United States. The population was 14,295 at the 2010 census. It is part of the Greenville-Mauldin-Easley metropolitan area.

== Geography ==
According to the United States Census Bureau, the CDP has a total area of 8.0 square miles (21 km^{2}), of which 7.7 square miles (20 km^{2}) (96.25%) is land and 0.3 square miles (0.78 km^{2}) (3.75%) is water.

== Demographics ==
Historical population
Census	Pop.	Note	%±
2020	15,578		—
U.S. Decennial Census

=== 2020 census ===
As of the 2020 census, Berea had a population of 15,578, with 6,035 households and 3,543 families. The median age was 37.2 years. 24.8% of residents were under the age of 18 and 17.4% were 65 years of age or older. For every 100 females there were 96.6 males, and for every 100 females age 18 and over there were 91.1 males age 18 and over.

100.0% of residents lived in urban areas, while 0.0% lived in rural areas.

Of the 6,035 households, 31.9% had children under the age of 18 living in them. 38.6% were married-couple households, 21.3% were households with a male householder and no spouse or partner present, and 32.2% were households with a female householder and no spouse or partner present. About 30.0% of households were made up of individuals, and 12.0% had someone living alone who was 65 years of age or older.

There were 6,403 housing units, of which 5.7% were vacant. The homeowner vacancy rate was 1.2% and the rental vacancy rate was 6.2%.

Berea racial composition
Race	Num.	Perc.
White (non-Hispanic)	7,100	45.58%
Black or African American (non-Hispanic)	3,044	19.54%
Native American	31	0.2%
Asian	193	1.24%
Pacific Islander	15	0.1%
Other/Mixed	596	3.83%
Hispanic or Latino	4,599	29.52%

=== 2010 census ===
At the 2010 census there were 14,295 people, 5,441 households, and 3,728 families living in the CDP. The population density was 1,855.5 inhabitants per square mile (716.4/km^{2}). There were 6,093 housing units at an average density of 761.6 per square mile (294.1/km^{2}). The racial makeup of the CDP was 60.6% White, 18.1% African American, 0.51% Native American, 1.2% Asian, 0.007% Pacific Islander, 16.9% from other races, and 2.7% from two or more races. Hispanic or Latino of any race were 25.4%. People of Mexican ancestry made the largest portion of the CDP's Hispanic or Latino population, at 14.1%.

Of the 5,441 households 29.4% had children under the age of 18 living with them, 43.9% were married couples living together, 17.8% had a female householder with no husband present, and 31.5% were non-families. 25.5% of households were one person and 10.4% were one person aged 65 or older. The average household size was 2.58 and the average family size was 3.05.

The age distribution was 24.1% under the age of 18, 9.4% from 18 to 24, 27.3% from 25 to 44, 22.6% from 45 to 64, and 15.9% 65 or older. The median age was 36.2 years. For every 100 females, there were 94.9 males. For every 100 females age 18 and over, there were 92.0 males.

The median household income was $29,964 and the median family income was $37,955. Males had a median income of $32,387 versus $30,692 for females. The per capita income for the CDP was $17,257. About 25.1% of families and 31.7% of the population were below the poverty line, including 49.8% of those under age 18 and 13.6% of those age 65 or over.

== Education ==
Berea has a public library, a branch of the Greenville County Library System.
