= Trout, Louisiana =

- Census-designated place
- Location within Louisiana Location within the United States
- Coordinates: 31°41′45″N 92°10′43″W
- Country: United States
- State: Louisiana
- Parish: La Salle

Area
  - Total: 0.089 sq mi (0.23 km^{2})
  - Land: 0.089 sq mi (0.23 km^{2})
  - Water: 0 sq mi (0.00 km^{2})
- Elevation: 203 ft (62 m)

Population (2020)
  - Total: 104
  - Density: 1,177/sq mi (454.4/km^{2})
- Time zone: UTC-6 (Central (CST))
  - Summer (DST): UTC-5 (CDT)
- ZIP code: 71371
- Area code: 318
- GNIS feature ID: 543737

Trout is an unincorporated community and census-designated place in La Salle Parish, Louisiana, United States. The community is located on U.S. Route 84, 2.8 miles (4.5 km) west of Jena. Trout has a post office with ZIP code 71371.

It was first listed as a CDP in the 2020 census with a population of 104.

== Demographics ==
Historical population
Census	Pop.	Note	%±
2020	104		—
U.S. Decennial Census; 2020

Trout was first listed as a census designated place in the 2020 U.S. census.

=== 2020 census ===
Trout CDP, Louisiana – Demographic Profile (NH = Non-Hispanic)
Race / Ethnicity	Pop 2020	% 2020
White alone (NH)	77	74.04%
Black or African American alone (NH)	11	10.58%
Native American or Alaska Native alone (NH)	2	1.92%
Asian alone (NH)	0	0.00%
Pacific Islander alone (NH)	1	0.96%
Some Other Race alone (NH)	0	0.00%
Mixed Race/Multi-Racial (NH)	9	8.65%
Hispanic or Latino (any race)	4	3.85%
Total	104	100.00%

Note: the US Census treats Hispanic/Latino as an ethnic category. This table excludes Latinos from the racial categories and assigns them to a separate category. Hispanics/Latinos can be of any race.
