= WRWR (FM) =

Radio station in Cochran–Macon, Georgia

- Cochran, Georgia; United States
- Broadcast area: Macon/Warner Robins
- Frequency: 107.5 MHz (HD Radio)
- Branding: KISS 105.1 & 107.5

Programming
- Format: Urban adult contemporary
- Affiliations: Compass Media Networks

Ownership
- Owner: Christopher Murray; (Georgia Radio Alliance, LLC.)
- Sister stations: WBML, WFXM, WYPZ

History
- First air date: 1968
- Former call signs: WVMG-FM (1968-2005); WDXQ-FM (2005–2009); WRWR-FM (2009–2013); WYPZ (2013–2015)
- Former frequencies: 96.7 MHz (1968-2010)
- Call sign meaning: Warner Robins (WR times two)

Technical information
- Licensing authority: FCC
- Facility ID: 26626
- Class: A
- ERP: 4,000 watts
- HAAT: 122.3 meters (401 ft)
- Transmitter coordinates: 32°24′43.00″N 83°21′42.00″W
- Translator: 105.1 W286CE (Fort Valley)
- Repeater: 107.1 WFXM-HD2 (Gordon)

Links
- Public license information: Public file; LMS
- Webcast: Listen Live
- Website: www.kissmacon.com

WRWR (107.5 MHz) is an FM radio station broadcasting an urban adult contemporary format. The station is currently owned by Christopher Murray, through licensee Praise 107.5 FM Radio LLC, and operates from studios in Macon, Georgia. WRWR has an FM translator on 105.1 in Macon.

== History ==
WRWR traces its history to WVMG-FM, the FM sister station to WVMG (1440 AM) in Cochran. The station was licensed in 1968; Broadcasting reported that the FCC granted a license covering WVMG-FM at Cochran on August 29, 1968. In 1972, Broadcasting reported that WVMG AM-FM had been sold by John Hulett and John Harris to Raymond B. and Cleo Forehand for $80,000. At the time, WVMG-FM operated on 96.7 MHz with 3,000 watts and an antenna 155 feet above average terrain.

Although the 96.7 MHz allotment was originally listed as Channel 244A at Eastman, the FCC noted in 1974 that the channel was already operating as WVMG-FM at Cochran. The commission reassigned Channel 244A to Cochran, effective November 1, 1974, stating that the public interest was served by assigning the channel to Cochran, "where it is in use".

In 1977, Happy Acres Broadcasting Co. sought to assign WVMG-FM to Georgia Communications Corp. for $150,000. The proposed buyer was owned equally by E. W. "John" Johnson, a former employee of WCEH AM-FM in Hawkinsville, and E. Hunt Sanders, a Warner Robins physician. In late 1978, the FCC granted WVMG-FM a construction permit to install a new transmitter and antenna and to operate with 3,000 watts horizontal and vertical polarization from an antenna height of 300 feet.

By 2000, WVMG AM-FM was part of a larger Macon and Warner Robins cluster sold by Taylor Broadcasting to Clear Channel Communications for about $17 million. Broadcasting & Cable listed WVMG-FM as a country station on 96.7 MHz. Clear Channel sold WVMG (AM) and WVMG-FM to Communications Capital Managers LLC in 2003 for $675,000; both stations were listed with country formats, and WVMG-FM was listed at 96.7 MHz with 6,000 watts. FCCInfo call sign records show that WVMG-FM became WDXQ-FM on March 15, 2005.

In 2007, WDXQ and WDXQ-FM were included in a $2.3 million multi-station sale from Communications Capital Managers to Georgia Eagle Broadcasting Inc. The FCC granted the WDXQ-FM assignment to Georgia Eagle on May 10, 2007.

During Georgia Eagle's ownership, the station moved from 96.7 MHz to 107.5 MHz. FCCInfo application records show that the station's minor-modification application for 107.5 MHz was granted on August 20, 2009, and that its license to cover on 107.5 MHz was granted on January 22, 2010. The call sign changed from WDXQ-FM to WRWR-FM on December 16, 2009. Georgia Eagle operated the station as News/Talk WRWR-FM 107.5, "The Patriot", connected with the WarnerRobinsPatriot.com local news operation, WRWR-TV 38, AM 1350 News, and ESPN 99.9. Its talk schedule included Bill Bennett, Laura Ingraham, Glenn Beck, Phil Valentine, Lars Larson, Rusty Humphries, Phil Hendrie, and Mike Gallagher.

In 2013, Christopher Murray agreed to purchase WRWR AM and FM from Georgia Eagle Media. Media Services Group valued WRWR-FM at $400,000 and WRWR-AM at $200,000 in the transaction. FCCInfo records show that the assignment of the FM station was granted on September 25, 2013. The call sign changed to WYPZ on December 4, 2013, and returned to WRWR on February 19, 2015.
