= WBML =

- Warner Robins, Georgia; United States
- Broadcast area: Macon area
- Frequency: 1350 kHz
- Branding: 94.7 and 95.5 Fox-FM

Programming
- Format: Classic hits
- Affiliations: Compass Media Networks; United Stations Radio Networks

Ownership
- Owner: John Timms; (Central Georgia Radio LLC)
- Operator: Christopher Murray (Georgia Radio Alliance, LLC.)
- Sister stations: WFXM; WRWR; WYPZ

History
- First air date: October 13, 1954 (as WRPB)
- Former call signs: WRPB (1954–1966); WAVC (1966–1982); WCOP (1982–2001); WNNG (2001–2010); WRWR (2010–2015); WYPZ (2015)

Technical information
- Licensing authority: FCC
- Facility ID: 67210
- Class: B
- Power: 15,000 watts day; 500 watts night
- Transmitter coordinates: 32°37′1.0″N 83°39′00.0″W
- Translators: 94.7 W234CQ (Macon, relays WFXM-HD4); 95.5 W238CG (Warner Robins)
- Repeater: (107.1-4) WFXM-HD4 (Gordon)

Links
- Public license information: Public file; LMS
- Webcast: Listen live
- Website: www.foxfmmacon.com

WBML (1350 AM) is a radio station licensed to Warner Robins, Georgia, and serves the Macon metropolitan area. Broadcasting a classic hits format branded as "Fox FM", the station can also be heard on two FM translators in the Macon area, 94.7 W234CQ in Macon which relays programming from WFXM-HD4, and 95.5 W238CG in Warner Robins, which is licensed to relay WBML. WBML is owned by John Timms.

== History ==
The station signed on October 13, 1954, as WRPB, signifying Warner Robins, Perry and Byron. Other callsigns included WAVC, WCOP, WNNG, and WRWR.

Prior to the current format, WRWR simulcasted WRWR-FM's news/talk format and had been WNNG, "Wing 1350", a satellite-fed adult standards station broadcasting ABC Radio's Timeless format (the station had used ABC's now-defunct "Unforgettable Favorites"/"Memories" network which was merged with "Timeless Classics" to create the current "Timeless Favorites", and before that, Westwood One's America's Best Music).

On February 19, 2015, WRWR changed its format from urban AC to black gospel, branded as "Praise 95.5" under new WYPZ calls. The station changed its call sign on October 5, 2015, to the current WBML.

In mid-2017, WBML started simulcasting programming from classic hits formatted "The Fox 94.7" WFXM-HD3/W234CQ Gordon/Macon. According to station management, station operator Christopher Murray, who owns WFXM, WRWR, and WYPZ in the Macon market (as well as WEKS, and WBAF in the Fayetteville market) has announced his plans to eventually acquire WBML from John Timms, who is currently the owner and engineer for WBML.

Eventually, WBML/WFXM-HD3/W234CQ would rebrand as "94.7 and 95.5 Fox FM" with no change in format.

As of 2020, the classic hits "Fox FM" brand can now be heard in the Fayetteville market on two separate AM stations (WBAF and WFDR) and their FM translators. While they are not simulcasting WBML, the music playlist, logo, imaging and programming is almost identical to that of WBML. "Fox FM" programming was later expanded into Atlanta on WWPW-HD4/102.1 W271CV.
