= Gordon, Georgia =

- Town
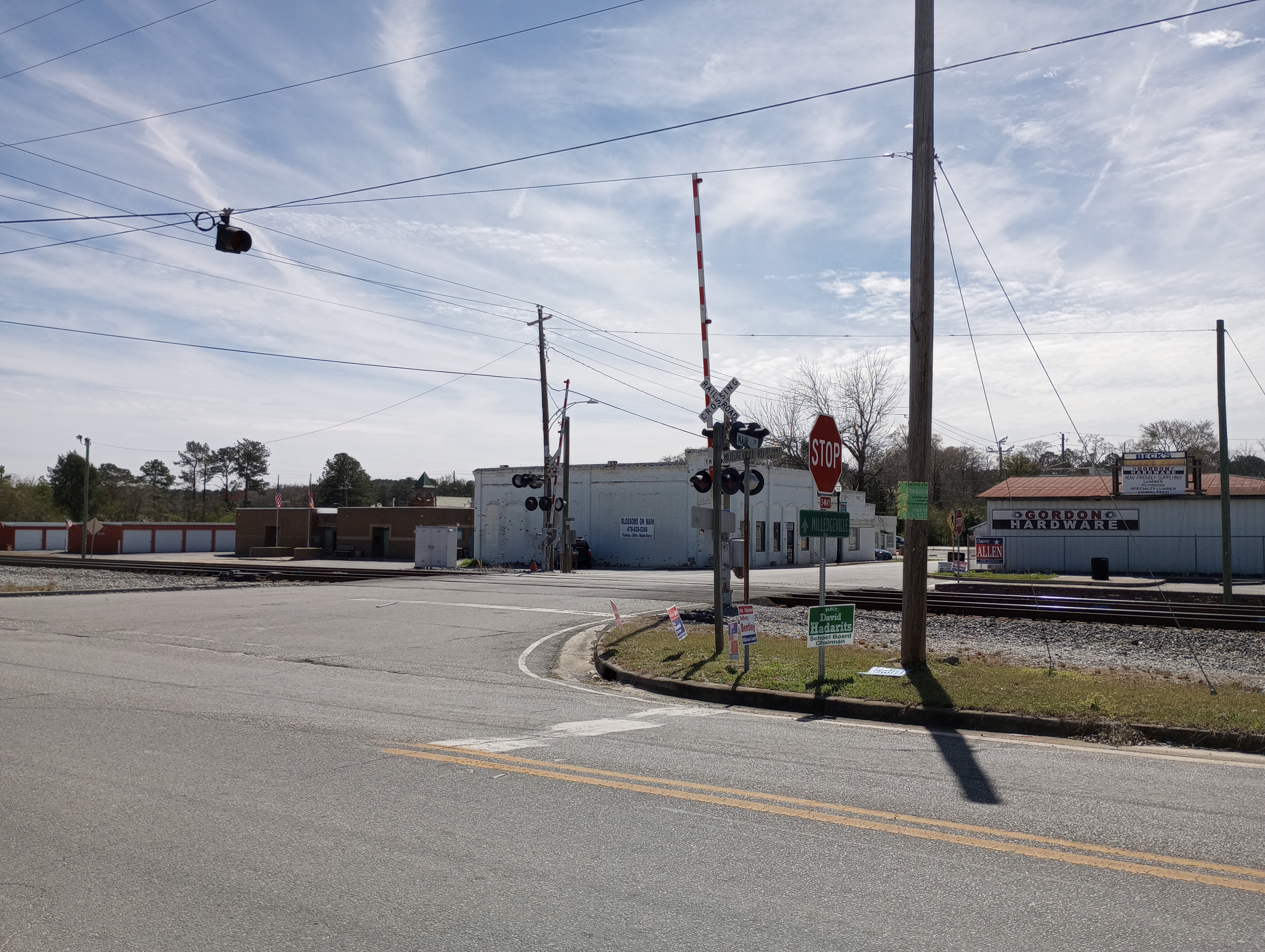
- Main Street

- Location in Wilkinson County and the state of Georgia
- Coordinates: 32°53′9″N 83°20′7″W
- Country: United States
- State: Georgia
- County: Wilkinson
- Established: 1843

Area
  - Total: 5.45 sq mi (14.11 km^{2})
  - Land: 5.39 sq mi (13.96 km^{2})
  - Water: 0.058 sq mi (0.15 km^{2})
- Elevation: 348 ft (106 m)

Population (2020)
  - Total: 1,783
  - Density: 330.8/sq mi (127.72/km^{2})
- Time zone: UTC-5 (Eastern (EST))
  - Summer (DST): UTC-4 (EDT)
- ZIP code: 31031
- Area code: 478
- FIPS code: 13-33980
- GNIS feature ID: 0356053
- Website: cityofgordonga.org

Gordon is a city in Wilkinson County, Georgia, United States. As of 2020, its population was 1,783.

== History ==
Gordon was founded in 1843 as a depot on the Central of Georgia Railway. The city was named after William Washington Gordon, a railroad official.

=== Tornado ===
On April 3rd, 2017, Gordon was impacted by an EF2 tornado, causing severe damage to multiple businesses and a local park. The tornado caused $100,000 in damages. Nobody was killed or injured.

== Geography ==
According to the United States Census Bureau, the city has a total area of 5.5 square miles (14 km^{2}), of which 5.4 square miles (14 km^{2}) is land and 0.1 square miles (0.26 km^{2}) (1.10%) is water.

== Demographics ==
Historical population
Census	Pop.	Note	%±
1880	343		—
1900	509		—
1910	702		37.9%
1920	1,081		54.0%
1930	1,199		10.9%
1940	1,524		27.1%
1950	1,761		15.6%
1960	1,793		1.8%
1970	2,553		42.4%
1980	2,768		8.4%
1990	2,468		−10.8%
2000	2,152		−12.8%
2010	2,017		−6.3%
2020	1,783		−11.6%
U.S. Decennial Census; 1850-1870 1870-1880; 1890-1910 1920-1930; 1940 1950 1960; 1970 1980 1990; 2000 2010

=== 2020 census ===
As of the 2020 census, Gordon had a population of 1,783 people in 734 households, including 410 families. The median age was 40.6 years. 22.3% of residents were under the age of 18 and 19.3% were 65 years of age or older. For every 100 females there were 86.7 males, and for every 100 females age 18 and over there were 83.2 males age 18 and over.

Gordon racial composition as of 2020
Race	Num.	Perc.
White (non-Hispanic)	753	42.23%
Black or African American (non-Hispanic)	944	52.94%
Native American	1	0.06%
Other/Mixed	53	2.97%
Hispanic or Latino	32	1.79%

0.0% of residents lived in urban areas, while 100.0% lived in rural areas.

Among households, 33.4% had children under the age of 18 living in them. Of all households, 35.0% were married-couple households, 20.4% were households with a male householder and no spouse or partner present, and 39.6% were households with a female householder and no spouse or partner present. About 32.0% of all households were made up of individuals, and 14.7% had someone living alone who was 65 years of age or older.

There were 872 housing units, of which 15.8% were vacant. The homeowner vacancy rate was 2.0% and the rental vacancy rate was 11.4%.

== Notable people ==
- Jim Williams, preservationist
