= List of Great Performances episodes =

This is an incomplete list of episodes for the television series Great Performances. It includes special episodes.

== Episodes ==
=== New York Playhouse (1972–73) ===
- Antigone (October 7, 1972)
- The Rimers of Eldritch (November 4, 1972)
- Theatre and Film '72 (December 16, 1972)

=== Season 1 (1973–74) ===
==== As Theatre in America ====
- Enemies, from the Repertory Theater of Lincoln Center (January 23, 1974)
- June Moon (January 30, 1974)
- Cyrano de Bergerac, from the American Conservatory Theater (February 6, 1974)
- Antigone, from Playhouse New York (February 13, 1974)
- King Lear, from the New York Shakespeare Festival (February 20, 1974)
- In Fashion, from the Actors Theatre of Louisville (March 20, 1974)
- Feasting with Panthers by Adrian Hall and Richard Cumming, from Trinity Repertory Company (March 27, 1974)
- The Contractor by David Storey, from Chelsea Theater Center (April 10, 1974)
- The Widowing of Mrs. Holroyd, from Long Wharf Theater (May 8, 1974)
- A Touch of the Poet (May 15, 1974)
- Monkey, Monkey, Bottle of Beer, How Many Monkeys Have We Here?, from Cincinnati Playhouse in the Park (May 22, 1974)

=== Season 2 (1974–75) ===
- Arthur Rubinstein: Chopin (October 16, 1974)
- Herbert von Karajan and the Berlin Philharmonic Orchestra (November 13, 1974)
- Solti Conducts Mendelssohn (December 16, 1974)
- Bernstein at Tanglewood (December 25, 1974)
- Herbert von Karajan and the Berlin Philharmonic Orchestra play Beethoven's Ninth Symphony (December 31, 1974)
- Theater in America: Zalmen or the Madness of God by Elie Wiesel, from Arena Stage (January 8, 1975)
- Theater in America: The Seagull, from Williamstown Theatre Festival (January 29, 1975)
- Theater in America: Brother to Dragons, adapted from the poem by Robert Penn Warren by Adrian Hall and Ken Campbell, from Trinity Repertory Company (February 19, 1975)
- Theater in America: The Ceremony of Innocence (March 1, 1975)
- Theater in America: Forget‐Me‐Not Lane by Peter Nichols, from Long Wharf Theater (March 12, 1975)
- Pagliacci, from La Scala (March 19, 1975)
- Theater in America: The School for Scandal, from the Guthrie Theater (April 2, 1975)
- Theater in America: The Rules of the Game, from the New Phoenix Repertory Company (April 30, 1975)
- Who's Happy Now? by Oliver Hailey

=== Season 3 (1975–76) ===
- Jennie: Lady Randolph Churchill
- The Collection, from Laurence Olivier Presents (January 1, 1976)
- Theater in America: Beyond the Horizon, from the McCarter Theatre (January 14, 1976)
- Dance in America: Joffrey Ballet (January 21, 1976)
- Theater in America: First Breeze of Summer by Leslie Lee, from the Negro Ensemble Company (January 28, 1976)
- Live from Lincoln Center: New York Philharmonic with André Previn and Van Cliburn (January 30, 1976)
- Theater in America: The Mound Builders by Lanford Wilson, from the Circle Repertory Company (February 11, 1976)
- Dance in America: Twyla Tharp & Dancers (February 25, 1976)
- Theater in America: The Time of Your Life, from The Acting Company
- Dance in America: Martha Graham Dance Company (April 7, 1976)
- Live from Lincoln Center: The Ballad of Baby Doe (April 21, 1976)
- Theater in America: All Over, from the Hartford Stage (April 28, 1976)
- Theater in America: Who's Happy Now, from the Mark Taper Forum
- Theater in America: The Year of the Dragon, from The American Place Theatre
- Dance in America: Pennsylvania Ballet
- Dance in America: Martha Graham Dance Company
- Theater in America: The Patriots, from Asolo Theatre Company (May 26, 1976)
- Theater in America: The Eccentricities of a Nightingale, with the Old Globe Theater (June 16, 1976)
- Live from Lincoln Center: Swan Lake (June 30, 1976)
- Leonard Bernstein Conducts Music from America (NY Philharmonic at Royal Albert Hall) (July 12, 1976)

=== Season 4 (1976–77) ===
- Theater in America: Ah! Wilderness (October 12, 1976)
- Fine Music Specials: Madama Butterfly (October 20, 1976)
- Live from Lincoln Center: The Barber of Seville (November 3, 1976)
- Theater in America: The Taming of the Shrew, from the American Conservatory Theater (November 10, 1976)
- Live from Lincoln Center: New York Philharmonic with Rafael Kubelik and Claudio Arrau (November 20, 1976)
- Live from Lincoln Center: André Watts in Recital (November 28, 1976)
- Solti Conducts Mendelssohn (December 15, 1976)
- Chester Mystery Plays (December 22, 1976)
- Secret Service by William Gillette, from the Phoenix Theatre (January 12, 1977)
- Dance in America: Choreography by Balanchine (January 19, 1977)
- Arthur Rubinstein at 90 (January 26, 1977)
- Haydn's Concerto No. 1 and Concerto No 2. with Mstislav Rostropovich and the Orchestra of the Academy of St. Martin-in-the-Field (March 30, 1977)
- Theater in America: The Prince of Homburg from the Chelsea Theater Center (April 27, 1977)
- Dance in America: Pilobolus Dance Theater (May 4, 1977)
- Hard Times (starting May 11, 1977)
- Live from Lincoln Center: Giselle (June 2, 1977)
- Theater in America: End of Summer by S. N. Behrman, from the Charles MacArthur Center for American Theater (June 15, 1977)
- Abide with Me (July 12, 1977)
- Live from Lincoln Center: New York Philharmonic with Zubin Mehta and Shirley Verrett (September 24, 1977)

=== Season 5 (1977–78) ===
- Live from Lincoln Center: Manon (October 18, 1977)
- Live from Lincoln Center: New York Philharmonic with Erich Leinsdorf and André Watts (October 29, 1977)
- Off Stage: The Royal Family (November 9, 1977)
- Verna: USO Girl (January 25, 1978)
- Live from Lincoln Center: Coppélia (January 31, 1978)
- Live from Lincoln Center: Luciano Pavarotti in Recital at the Metropolitan Opera House (February 12, 1978)
- Count Dracula (March 1, 1978)
- Live from Lincoln Center: The Saint of Bleecker Street (April 19, 1978)
- Live from Lincoln Center: American Ballet Theatre at the Metropolitan Opera House (May 17, 1978)
- Theater in America: Uncommon Women and Others (May 24, 1978)

=== Season 6 (1978–79) ===
- Out of Our Father's House (August 2, 1978)
- Live from Lincoln Center: New York Philharmonic with Zubin Mehta and Rudolf Serkin (September 20, 1978)
- Live from Lincoln Center: The Turk in Italy (October 4, 1978)
- Theater in America: The Good Doctor (November 8, 1978)
- Mourning Becomes Electra (December 6, 1978 to January 3, 1979)
- Live from Lincoln Center: Chamber Music Society with Itzhak Perlman (December 10, 1978)
- Live from Lincoln Center: New York Philharmonic with Zubin Mehta and Itzhak Perlman (January 17, 1979)
- Live from Lincoln Center: Luciano Pavarotti and Dame Joan Sutherland in Recital (January 22, 1979)
- Live from Lincoln Center: The Sleeping Beauty (May 2, 1979)
- Theater in America: When Hell Freezes Over, I'll Skate, conceived by Vinnette Justine Carroll with music by Cleavant Derricks and Clinton Derricks-Carroll, from the Urban Arts Corps

=== Season 7 (1979–1980) ===
- Musical Comedy Tonight, hosted by Sylvia Fine Kaye (October 1, 1979)
- Live from Lincoln Center: Dame Joan Sutherland and Marilyn Horne in Recital (October 15, 1979)
- Live from Lincoln Center: Street Scene (October 27, 1979)
- The Five Forty-Eight (November 7, 1979)
- Live from Lincoln Center: New York Philharmonic with Zubin Mehta and Emil Gilels (November 14, 1979)
- Live from Lincoln Center: New York Philharmonic with Zubin Mehta and Luciano Pavarotti (January 14, 1980)
- The Most Happy Fella (March 5, 1980)
- Live from Lincoln Center: A Tribute to John Huston (May 5, 1980)
- Live from Lincoln Center: La Bayadère (May 28, 1980)
- Samuel Beckett's Happy Days (June 25, 1980)

=== Season 8 (1980–81) ===
- Live from Lincoln Center: Isaac Stern's 60th Birthday Celebration (September 24, 1980)
- Live from Lincoln Center: Verdi's Requiem (October 22, 1980)
- Live from Lincoln Center: La Cenerentola (November 6, 1980)
- Life on the Mississippi (November 24, 1980)
- Live from Lincoln Center: Beverly! Her Farewell Performance (January 5, 1981)
- Live from Lincoln Center: Chamber Music with Itzhak Perlman (February 2, 1981)
- Live from Lincoln Center: New York Philharmonic with Zubin Mehta and Vladimir Ashkenazy (February 18, 1981)
- Great Performances at the Met: "L'Elisir D'Amore" (March 2, 1981)
- Live from Lincoln Center: Dame Joan Sutherland, Marilyn Horne and Luciano Pavarotti in Concert (March 23, 1981)
- Rhapsody and Song – A Tribute to George Gershwin (May 9, 1981)
- Live from Lincoln Center: An Evening with American Ballet Theatre (May 20, 1981)
- "The Girls in Their Summer Dresses" and Other Stories (June 1, 1981)

=== Season 9 (1981–82) ===
- Norma (September 20, 1981)
- Live from Lincoln Center: An Evening with Danny Kaye (September 23, 1981)
- La Clemenza di Tito (October 19, 1981)
- The House of Mirth (November 2, 1981)
- Summer (November 9, 1981)
- Edith Wharton: Looking Back (November 16, 1981)
- Brideshead Revisited (January 18, 1982)
- Live from Lincoln Center: An Evening with Itzhak Perlman (February 10, 1982)
- Live from Lincoln Center: Lucia di Lammermoor (April 10, 1982)
- Live from Lincoln Center: A Tribute to Billy Wilder (May 3, 1982)
- Live from Lincoln Center: Two Philharmonics: Israel and New York (June 3, 1982)
- Live from Lincoln Center: James Galway Plays Mostly Mozart (July 14, 1982)
- Live from Lincoln Center: New York Philharmonic with Zubin Mehta and Leontyne Price (September 15, 1982)
- Live from Lincoln Center: Stravinski and Balanchine: A Genius Has a Birthday! (October 4, 1982)
- Live from Lincoln Center: Madama Butterfly (October 20, 1982)

=== Season 10 (1982–83) ===
- Great Performances' 10th Anniversary Celebration (December 6, 1982)
- Live from Lincoln Center: Chamber Music Society with Chick Corea (January 9, 1983)
- Live from Lincoln Center: Beethoven's Ninth Symphony (January 2, 1983)
- The Regard of Flight by Bill Irwin (February 7, 1983)
- Ellington: The Music Lives On (March 7, 1983)
- Live from Lincoln Center: Luciano Pavarotti with Zubin Mehta and the New York Philharmonic (April 4, 1983)
- The Innocents Abroad (May 9, 1983)
- Festival! Spoleto USA (June 27, 1983)

=== Season 11 (1983–84) ===
- Princess Grace Remembered (September 26, 1983)
- Alice in Wonderland (October 3, 1983)
- Live from Lincoln Center: A Tribute to George Balanchine (October 10, 1983)
- Live from Lincoln Center: The Cunning Little Vixen (November 9, 1983)
- Callas: An International Celebration (December 11, 1983)
- An American Christmas (December 19, 1983)
- Live from Lincoln Center: Marilyn Horne's Great American Songbook (December 28, 1983)
- The Magic Flute (January 9, 1984)
- La Cenerentola (February 6, 1984)
- Choreographer's Notebook: Stravinsky Piano Ballets by Peter Martins (February 13, 1984)
- Live from Lincoln Center: James Galway with Zubin Mehta and the New York Philharmonic (February 29, 1983)
- The Soldier's Tale, directed by R. O. Blechman (March 19, 1984)

=== Season 12 (1984–85) ===
- Live from Lincoln Center: Back to Bach (September 12, 1984)
- Live from Lincoln Center: Carmen (September 26, 1984)
- Live from Lincoln Center: New York Philharmonic with Zubin Mehta and Pinchas Zukerman (October 3, 1984)
- Dance in America: Baryshnikov by Tharp (October 5, 1984)
- The Dining Room (October 19, 1984)
- Live from Lincoln Center: 25th Anniversary Fanfare (October 26, 1984)
- You Can't Take It With You (November 21, 1984)
- Lena Horne: The Lady and Her Music (December 7, 1984)
- Live from Lincoln Center: New Year's Eve Gala (December 31, 1984)
- From Vienna: The New Year's Celebration 1985 hosted by Walter Cronkite (January 1, 1985)
- Dance Black America, directed by D. A. Pennebaker and Chris Hegedus (January 25, 1985)
- Live from Lincoln Center: Andre Watts in Concert (February 20, 1985)
- Live from Lincoln Center: Great Russian Theater Music (March 11, 1985)
- Judy Garland: The Concert Years (March 22, 1985)
- Heartbreak House (April 24, 1985)
- Sweeney Todd: The Demon Barber of Fleet Street (May 3, 1985)
- Taking My Turn (May 10, 1985)
- The Best of Broadway (May 24, 1985)
- Orpheus (June 7, 1985)
- Ulysses (June 14, 1985)
- The Coronation of Poppea (June 21, 1985)
- Live from Lincoln Center: Mostly Mozart Meets Salieri (July 10, 1985)

=== Season 13 (1985–86) ===
- Doctor Fischer of Geneva (October 11, 1985)
- Three by Three (October 18, 1985)
- Laurence Olivier—A Life (October 25–31, 1985)
- The Gospel at Colonus (November 8, 1985)
- Master Harold...and the Boys (November 15, 1985)
- Sylvia Fine Kaye's Musical Comedy Tonight III (The Spark and the Glue) (November 22, 1985)
- The Importance of Being Earnest (November 29, 1985)
- San Francisco Ballet in Cinderella (December 7, 1985)
- Falstaff (December 13, 1985)
- Rossini at Versailles (December 27, 1985)
- From Vienna: The New Year's Celebration 1986 hosted by Walter Cronkite (January 1, 1986)
- On the Razzle (January 3, 1986)
- (January 14, 1986)
- Heartbreak House (January 24, 1986)
- Einstein on the Beach: The Changing Image of Opera (January 31, 1986)
- The Cotton Club Remembered (February 7, 1986)
- Irving Berlin's America (March 7, 1986)
- Follies in Concert (March 14, 1986)
- Cavalleria Rusticana (March 21, 1986)
- Bernstein Conducts Haydn's Mass in Time of War (March 28, 1986)
- Elektra (April 11, 1986)
- Early Days (April 18, 1986)
- Dance in America: Choreography by Jerome Robbins with the New York City Ballet (May 2, 1986)
- Grown Ups by Jules Feiffer (May 9, 1986)
- Boxes: With the Sydney Dance Company (May 16, 1986)
- Bernstein on Brahms: Reflections and Performance [three parts] (May 23; May 30; June 6, 1986)

=== Season 14 (1986–87) ===
- (September 15, 1986)
- Miles Ahead: The Music of Miles Davis (October 17, 1986)
- Gian Carlo Menotti: The Musical Magician (November 21, 1986)
- Goya, by Gian Carlo Menotti (November 28, 1986)
- (December 16, 1986)
- From Vienna: The New Year's Celebration 1987 hosted by Walter Cronkite (January 1, 1987)
- The Silents: The Thief of Bagdad (January 9, 1987)
- In Memory Of... (January 16, 1987)
- (January 21, 1987)
- Monsignor Quixote (February 13, 1987)
- James Stewart: A Wonderful Life (March 13, 1987)
- Broadway Sings the Music of Jule Styne (March 20, 1987)
- Ozawa, directed by Albert and David Maysles (March 27, 1987)
- The Comedy of Errors (April 1, 1987)
- Steve Reich: A New Musical Language (April 10, 1987)
- Seize the Day (May 1, 1987)
- Vladimir Horowitz: The Last Romantic, directed by Albert and David Maysles (May 22, 1987)

=== Season 15 (1987–88) ===
- The Music Makers: An ASCAP Celebration of American Music at Wolf Trap
- Tales from the Hollywood Hills: Natica Jackson (November 6, 1987)
- Tales from the Hollywood Hills: A Table at Ciro's (November 13, 1987)
- Tales from the Hollywood Hills: Pat Hobby Teamed with Genius (November 20, 1987)
- Celebrating Gershwin (November 27 and December 4, 1987)
- Christmas with Flicka (December 18, 1987)
- From Vienna: The New Year's Celebration 1988 hosted by Walter Cronkite (January 1, 1988)
- Toscanini: The Maestro (January 8, 1988)
- Wolf Trap Salutes Dizzy Gillespie: A Tribute to the Jazz Master (February 26, 1988)
- Bacall on Bogart (March 11, 1988)
- Nixon in China (April 15, 1988)
- The Silents: Our Hospitality (May 13, 1988)

=== Season 16 (1988–89) ===
- Tales from the Hollywood Hills: The Old Reliable (November 4, 1988)
- Tales from the Hollywood Hills: The Golden Land (November 11, 1988)
- Tales from the Hollywood Hills: The Closed Set (November 18, 1988)
- The Silents: The Eagle (November 25, 1988)
- From Vienna: The New Year's Celebration 1989 hosted by Walter Cronkite (January 1, 1989)[8]
- Wynton Marsalis Blues and Swing (February 24, 1989)
- Canciones de Mi Padre (March 3, 1989)
- Bernstein at 70 (March 19, 1989)
- The New Moon (April 7, 1989)
- The Philadelphia Orchestra at Wolf Trap (May 26, 1989)
- The Aspern Papers (June 9, 1989)
- Tap Dance in America

=== Season 17 (1989–1990) ===
- Show Boat (October 27, 1989)
- Our Town (November 2, 1989)
- An Evening with Alan Jay Lerner (November 24, 1989)
- L'Africaine, from the San Francisco Opera (December 15, 1989)
- Michael Tilson Thomas Conducts Miami's New World Orchestra (December 29, 1989)
- From Vienna: The New Year's Celebration 1990 hosted by Walter Cronkite (January 1, 1990)
- The Silents: Broken Blossoms (January 26, 1990)
- Music by Richard Rodgers (March 8, 1990)
- Solti's Beethoven: The Fifth Symphony Revisited (March 23, 1990)
- Largo desolato, from the Wilma Theater (April 20, 1990)
- The Orchestra, directed by Zbigniew Rybczyński (April 27, 1990)

=== Season 18 (1990–91) ===
- Hamlet
- Spike & Co.: Do It Acapella
- Swinging Out Live
- From Vienna: The New Year's Celebration 1991 hosted by Walter Cronkite (January 1, 1991)
- The Colored Museum
- The Fred Astaire Songbook
- A Masked Ball (May 22, 1991)

=== Season 19 (1991–92) ===
- Dance in America: Everybody Dance Now (October 2, 1991)
- Paul McCartney's Liverpool Oratorio
- La Pastorela: The Shepherd's Tale (December 23, 1991)
- Pavarotti and the Italian Tenor
- From Vienna: The New Year's Celebration 1992 hosted by Walter Cronkite (January 1, 1992)
- Unforgettable... with Love (March 7, 1992)
- The Lost Language of Cranes (June 24, 1992)

=== Season 20 (1992–93) ===
- Jammin': Jelly Roll Morton on Broadway (November 2, 1992)
- The Common Pursuit
- Guys and Dolls off the Record
- Placido Domingo: The Concert for Planet Earth
- José Carreras, Diana Ross and Placido Domingo: Christmas in Vienna
- The Hard Nut
- The Symphony of Rhythm: Solti Conducts Beethoven's Seventh
- Tosca From Rome (September 1992)
- From Vienna: The New Year's Celebration 1993 hosted by Walter Cronkite (January 1, 1993)
- Suddenly Last Summer (January 6, 1993)
- Black and Blue
- Miles Davis: A Tribute
- Sondheim: A Celebration at Carnegie Hall
- John Barry's Moviola (April 1, 1993)
- Nureyev (May 7, 1993)
- Oedipus Rex (May 26, 1993)
- The Real McTeague: A Synthesis of Forms
- In the Wings: Angels in America on Broadway (June 11, 1993)
- Lean by Jarre (August 9, 1993)

=== Season 21 (1993–94) ===
- The Maestros of Philadelphia
- The Sorceress
- Passing the Baton (October 20, 1993)
- Pete Townshend's PsychoDerelict (December 1, 1993)
- On the Town in Concert (December 22, 1993)
- Leonard Bernstein: The Gift of Music
- From Vienna: The New Year's Celebration 1994 hosted by Walter Cronkite (January 1, 1994)
- Turandot
- Jerry Herman's Broadway at the Bowl!
- Vladimir Horowitz: A Reminiscence
- Quartet
- The Songs of Six Families
- Carnegie Hall Salutes the Jazz Masters
- La Bohéme
- El Gato Montes

=== Season 22 (1994–95) ===
- Carnegie Hall Opening Night 1994
- The Dangerous Liaisons (October 17, 1994)
- Paddy Chayefsky's The Mother (October 24, 1994)
- The World of Jim Henson
- Natalie Cole's Untraditional Traditional Christmas
- From Vienna: The New Year's Celebration 1995 hosted by Walter Cronkite (January 1, 1995)
- The Music of Kurt Weill: September Songs
- Some Enchanted Evening: Celebrating Oscar Hammerstein II
- Talking With...
- Legendary Maestros: The Art of Conducting (May 24, 1995)

=== Season 23 (1995–96) ===
- Carnegie Hall Opening Night 1995
- Music for the Movies: The Hollywood Sound
- Itzhak Perlman: In the Fiddler's House
- Pavarotti: My World
- Julie Andrews: Back on Broadway
- The Sleeping Beauty (December 18, 1995)
- From Vienna: The New Year's Celebration 1996 hosted by Walter Cronkite (January 1, 1996)
- The Rake's Progress
- Les Misérables in Concert (March 1, 1996)
- Peter, Paul & Mary: Lifelines
- La Cenerentola
- Divas! (May 27, 1996)

=== Season 24 (1996–97) ===
- Carnegie Hall Opening Night 1996
- Dance in America: The Wrecker's Ball—Three Dances by Paul Taylor
- Dido and Aeneas (November 18, 1996)
- Musicals Great Musicals: The Arthur Freed Unit at MGM
- Bobby McFerrin: Loosely Mozart: The New Innovators of Classical Music
- From Vienna: The New Year's Celebration 1997 hosted by Walter Cronkite (January 1, 1997)
- Thomas Hampson: I Hear America Singing
- Robert Altman's Jazz '34
- The Story of Gospel Music
- Ira Gershwin at 100: A Celebration at Carnegie Hall
- Emmeline (April 2, 1997)
- Burt Bacharach: This Is Now

=== Season 25 (1997–98) ===
- Carnegie Hall Opening Night 1997
- Henry V at Shakespeare's Globe
- The Music of Kander and Ebb: Razzle Dazzle
- San Francisco Opera Gala Celebration
- The College of Comedy With Alan King
- From Vienna: The New Year's Celebration 1998 hosted by Walter Cronkite (January 1, 1998)
- Creating Ragtime
- Porgy & Bess: An American Voice
- The New Jersey Performing Arts Center Opening Night Gala
- Frank Sinatra: The Very Good Years
- The Art of Singing: Golden Voices, Silver Screen
- Dance In America: Variety and Virtuosity: American Ballet Theatre Now
- Swan Lake
- Sam Shepard's True West
- Sam Shepard: Stalking Himself
- The Elixir of Love

=== Season 26 (1998–99) ===
- Carnegie Hall Opening Night 1998
- Zizi: Je T'Aime
- Cats
- Pavarotti & Friends
- "A Streetcar Named Desire" from the San Francisco Opera
- From Vienna: The New Year's Celebration 1999 hosted by Walter Cronkite (January 1, 1999)
- The Rodgers & Hart Story: Thou Swell, Thou Witty
- The Noël Coward Story
- Star Crossed Lovers
- Swingin' with Duke: The Lincoln Center Jazz Orchestra with Wynton Marsalis
- Turandot at the Forbidden City
- The Making Of: Turandot at the Forbidden City
- Parsifal: The Search for the Grail

=== Season 27 (1999–2000) ===
- Carnegie Hall Opening Night 1999
- Crazy for You
- Burn the Floor
- My Favourite Broadway: The Leading Ladies
- Andrea Bocelli: Sacred Arias
- Dance in America: Le Corsaire with American Ballet Theatre
- From Vienna: The New Year's Celebration 2000 hosted by Walter Cronkite (January 1, 2000)
- Central Park
- Aida's Brothers and Sisters: Black Voices in Opera
- Joseph and the Amazing Technicolor Dreamcoat
- College of Comedy with Alan King, Part II
- Berlin Philharmonic Europakonzert: Ode to Joy 2000
- The Art of Piano
- Play On! (June 21, 2000)
- La Forza del Destino
- Can't Stop Now, a documentary on Nederlands Dans Theater III
- 'La Traviata' from Paris
- Berlin Philharmonic Europakonzert: From Krakow

=== Season 28 (2000–01) ===
- Carnegie Hall Opening Night 2000
- Chuck Jones: Extremes and In-Betweens, A Life in Animation
- Paul Simon: You're the One---In Concert from Paris
- From Mao to Mozart: Then and Now
- From Vienna: The New Year's Celebration 2001 hosted by Walter Cronkite (January 1, 2001)
- Copland's America
- The College of Comedy with Alan King III
- My Favorite Broadway: The Love Songs
- Elizabeth Taylor: England's Other Elizabeth
- Don Giovanni Unmasked
- Jesus Christ Superstar
- Don Quixote
- Dance in America: Free to Dance
- Three Mo' Tenors in Concert
- Recording `The Producers': A Musical Romp with Mel Brooks
- `Little Women' from Houston Grand Opera

=== Season 29 (2001–02) ===
- Recording 'The Producers': A Musical Romp with Mel Brooks
- 'Little Women' from Houston Grand Opera
- Dance in America: Holo Mai Pele
- Joshua Bell: West Side Story Suite From Central Park
- Alessandro Safina in Concert: Only You
- Wheel of Life
- The Art of Violin
- 'The Nutcracker' from the Royal Ballet
- From Vienna: The New Year's Celebration 2002 hosted by Walter Cronkite (January 1, 2002)
- Dance in America: From Broadway: Fosse
- Kurosawa
- The Queen's Jubilee Gala: Live from Buckingham Palace
- Romeo and Juliet
- Berlin Philharmonic Europakonzert: From Istanbul

=== Season 30 (2002–03) ===
- (September 24, 2002)
- Making 'The Misfits'
- Carnegie Hall Opening Night 2002
- Natalie Cole: Ask a Woman Who Knows
- Josh Groban in Concert
- 'The Merry Widow' from the San Francisco Opera (December 25, 2002)
- From Vienna: The New Year's Celebration 2003 hosted by Walter Cronkite (January 1, 2003)
- (January 21, 2003)
- Dance in America: Born to Be Wild
- Kiss Me, Kate
- The Great American Songbook
- Renee Fleming and Bryn Terfel: Music Under the Stars
- (March 25, 2003)
- (April 8, 2003)
- 30th Anniversary: A Celebration in Song
- Duetto: The Concert at the Roman Colosseum
- Dance in America: Lar Lubovitch's 'Othello'
- The Three Pickers: Legends of American Music
- Elton John at the Royal Opera House
- Berlin Philharmonic Europakonzert: From Palermo

=== Season 31 (2003–04) ===
- The Los Angeles Philharmonic Inaugurates Walt Disney Concert Hall (October 29, 2003)
- Rodgers & Hammerstein's 'Oklahoma!'
- Berlin Philharmonic Europakonzert: From Lisbon (December 10, 2003)
- From Vienna: The New Year's Celebration 2004 hosted by Walter Cronkite (January 1, 2004)
- Degas and the Dance
- Dance in America: Acts of Ardor: Two Dances by Paul Taylor (January 28, 2004)
- (February 10, 2004)
- Harry Connick Jr.: Only You (March 1, 2004)
- Concert for George
- Dance in America: 'The Dream' with American Ballet Theatre (April 21, 2004)
- Tchaikovsky Symphony No. 4 in Performance: The San Francisco Symphony and Michael Tilson Thomas
- Keeping Score: MTT on Music: The Making of a Performance, Tchaikovsky's 4th Symphony
- All-Star Piano Extravaganza: The Verbier Festival Concert
- From the Acropolis: A Salute to the Games with the Berlin Philharmonic

=== Season 32 (2004–05) ===
- John Lennon's Jukebox
- Carnegie Hall Opening Night 2004
- Eric Clapton: Crossroads Guitar Festival
- Josh Groban: Live at the Greek
- Hayley Westenra in Concert
- Rodgers and Hammerstein's Cinderella
- Bill Irwin: Clown Prince
- From Vienna: The New Year's Celebration 2005 hosted by Walter Cronkite (January 1, 2005)
- Leonard Bernstein's 'Candide' with the New York Philharmonic
- Andrea Bocelli: Tribute on Ice
- One Night with Rod Stewart
- The Little Prince
- Operatunity
- Dance in America: 'Swan Lake' with American Ballet Theatre
- Cook, Dixon & Young in Concert
- From Shtetl to Swing

=== Season 33 (2005–06) ===
- Renee Fleming: Sacred Songs and Carols
- Cream Reunion Concert
- Michael Bublé: Caught in the Act
- My Name Is Barbra
- The Nightingale (December 21, 2005)
- From Vienna: The New Year's Celebration 2006 hosted by Walter Cronkite (January 1, 2006)
- Paul McCartney: Chaos and Creation at Abbey Road
- Andrea Bocelli: Amore Under the Desert Sky
- 'South Pacific' in Concert from Carnegie Hall
- Dance in America: Beyond the Steps---Alvin Ailey American Dance Theater
- Garrison Keillor's Independence Day Special: A Prairie Home Companion at Tanglewood
- Bruce Springsteen: The Seeger Sessions Live at St. Luke's
- Vittorio: Dreams of Rome
- Dance in America: 'Jewels' from the Paris Opera Ballet
- The Vienna State Opera: 50th Anniversary Reopening Concert
- Mozart at 250: The Salzburg Festival Celebration

=== Season 34 (2006–07) ===
- Carnegie Hall Opening Night 2006
- A Tribute to James Taylor
- Beverly Sills: Made in America
- Garrison Keillor's New Year's Eve Special
- From Vienna: The New Year's Celebration 2007 hosted by Walter Cronkite (January 1, 2007)
- Sting: Songs From the Labyrinth
- Jerry Lee Lewis: Last Man Standing
- Loreena McKennitt: Nights From the Alhambra
- Barenboim on Beethoven
- We Love Ella! A Tribute to the First Lady of Song
- Dance in America: Dancing in the Light
- Respect Yourself: The Stax Records Story
- Lionel Richie: Live in Paris
- Nureyev: The Russian Years

=== Season 35 (2007–08) ===
- The Israel Philharmonic 70th Anniversary Gala Concert
- Eric Clapton Crossroads Guitar Festival Chicago
- Vivere: Andrea Bocelli Live in Tuscany
- Great Moments at the Met: Viewer's Choice (December 2, 2007)
- 'Rise and Fall of the City of Mahagonny' From LA Opera
- From Vienna: The New Year's Celebration 2008 hosted by Walter Cronkite (January 1, 2008)
- Carnegie Hall Celebrates Berlin
- Company (February 20, 2008)
- The New York Philharmonic Live From North Korea
- Martina McBride: Live in Concert
- James Taylor: One Man Band
- Peter & the Wolf
- Dance in America: Wolf Trap's Face of America
- Primo
- Maestro: Portrait of Valery Gergiev

=== Season 36 (2008–09) ===
- Pavarotti: A Life in Seven Arias
- Carnegie Hall Opening Night 2008: A Celebration of Leonard Bernstein
- Hitman: David Foster and Friends
- Domingo, Netrebko & Villazon: Three Stars in Vienna
- Dance in America: San Francisco Ballet's `Nutcracker'
- Doctor Atomic: Great Performances Live from the Met (December 29, 2008)
- From Vienna: The New Year's Celebration 2009 hosted by Julie Andrews (January 1, 2009)
- Cyrano de Bergerac (January 7, 2009)
- The Police: Certifiable
- King Lear
- 'In the Heights': Chasing Broadway Dreams (May 27, 2009 and November 10, 2017)
- Eric Clapton and Steve Winwood:Live from Madison Square Garden (May 30, 2009)
- Stevie Wonder: Live at Last
- 'Chess' in Concert
- Pete Seeger's 90th Birthday Celebration From Madison Square Garden

=== Season 37 (2009–2010) ===
- Harlem in Montmartre
- Karajan or Beauty As I See It
- Vienna Philharmonic Summer Concert 2009
- Gustavo Dudamel and the Los Angeles Philharmonic: The Inaugural Concert
- Sting: A Winter's Tale
- Andrea Bocelli & David Foster: My Christmas
- La Bohème
- From Vienna: The New Year's Celebration 2010 hosted by Julie Andrews (January 1, 2010)
- Passing Strange
- Michael Bublé Meets Madison Square Garden
- Dance in America: 'NY Export: Opus Jazz'
- Hamlet
- La Danse
- Vienna Philharmonic Summer Night Concert 2010
- Renée Fleming & Dmitri Hvorostovsky: A Musical Odyssey in St. Petersburg
- Macbeth

=== Season 38 (2010–11) ===
- Chicago Symphony Orchestra: Pierre Boulez Conducts Mahler's 7th
- Sondheim! The Birthday Concert
- Celebracion: Gustavo Dudamel and the L.A. Phil With Juan Diego Florez
- From Vienna: The New Year's Celebration 2011 hosted by Paula Zahn (January 1, 2011)
- Harry Connick, Jr. In Concert on Broadway
- Hitman Returns: David Foster & Friends
- Billy Joel: Live at Shea Stadium
- Jackie Evancho: Dream With Me in Concert
- Carnegie Hall 120th Anniversary Concert
- Eric Clapton Crossroads Guitar Festival 3
- Rigoletto From Mantua
- Vienna Philharmonic Summer Night 2011
- A Concert for New York
- Placido Domingo: My Favorite Roles

=== Season 39 (2011–12) ===
- Hugh Laurie: Let Them Talk...A Celebration of New Orleans Blues
- Miami City Ballet Dances Balanchine and Tharp
- Il Postino From LA Opera
- Andrea Bocelli Live in Central Park
- The Little Mermaid From San Francisco Ballet
- From Vienna: The New Year's Celebration 2012 hosted by Julie Andrews (January 1, 2012)
- Herbie Hancock, Gustavo Dudamel and the Los Angeles Philharmonic Celebrate Gershwin
- Let Me Down Easy by Anna Deavere Smith
- Tony Bennett Duets II
- Memphis
- The Phantom of the Opera at Royal Albert Hall
- The Thomashefskys: Music and Memories of a Life in the Yiddish Theater
- San Francisco Symphony at 100
- Twilight: Los Angeles
- Tanglewood 75th Anniversary Celebration
- Jackie Evancho: Music of the Movies
- Vienna Philharmonic Summer Night Concert 2012

=== Season 40 (2012–13) ===
- Paul McCartney's Live Kisses
- Great Performances at the Met: Wagner's Ring Cycle (September 11–14, 2012)
- Rod Stewart: Merry Christmas, Baby
- Magical Mystery Tour Revisited
- The Beatles' Magical Mystery Tour
- From Vienna: The New Year's Celebration 2013 hosted by Julie Andrews (January 1, 2013)
- Broadway Musicals: A Jewish Legacy
- Paul Simon's Graceland Journey
- Great Performances at the Met: L'Elisir d'Amore
- Great Performances at the Met: Otello
- Andrea Bocelli: Love In Portofino
- Great Performances at the Met: The Tempest
- Paul Taylor Dance Company in Paris
- Great Performances at the Met: La Clemenza di Tito
- Great Performances at the Met: Un Ballo in Maschera
- Great Performances at the Met: Rigoletto
- Great Performances at the Met: Aida
- Great Performances at the Met: Les Troyens
- Great Performances at the Met: Francesca da Rimini
- Great Performances at the Met: Giulio Cesare
- Dancing at Jacob's Pillow: Never Stand Still
- Vienna Philharmonic Summer Night Concert 2013

=== Season 41 (2013–14) ===
- The Hollow Crown: Richard II
- The Hollow Crown: Henry IV, Part 1
- The Hollow Crown: Henry IV, Part 2
- The Hollow Crown: Henry V
- Great Performances' 40th Anniversary Celebration
- Moby-Dick From San Francisco Opera
- Stephen Sondheim's 'Company' With the New York Philharmonic
- Barbra Steisand: Back to Brooklyn
- Pavarotti: A Voice for the Ages
- From Vienna: The New Year's Celebration 2014 hosted by Julie Andrews (January 1, 2014)
- Great Performances at the Met: Eugene Onegin
- Barrymore
- National Theatre: 50 Years on Stage
- Sting: The Last Ship
- Donald Fagen, Michael McDonald, Boz Scaggs: The Dukes of September
- Steve Martin and the Steep Canyon Rangers Featuring Edie Brickell in Concert
- Bob Dylan: The 30th Anniversary Concert Celebration
- The Dave Clark Five: Glad All Over, A Great Performances Special
- Matthew Bourne's Sleeping Beauty

=== Season 42 (2014–15) ===
- Dudamel Conducts the Verdi Requiem at the Hollywood Bowl
- Vienna Philharmonic Summer Night Concert 2014
- Rejoice With Itzhak Perlman
- Star-Spangled Spectacular: The Bicentennial of Our National Anthem
- Tony Bennett and Lady Gaga: Cheek to Cheek Live!
- Cats
- Encore! Great Performances at the Met
- From Vienna: The New Year's Celebration 2015 hosted by Julie Andrews (January 1, 2015)
- American Voices With Renée Fleming
- La Dolce Vita: The Music of Italian Cinema
- Bryan Adams in Concert
- Mark Morris Dance Group: L'Allegro
- Annie Lennox: Nostalgia Live in Concert
- Boston Symphony Orchestra: Andris Nelsons Inaugural Concert
- Driving Miss Daisy (July 17, 2015)
- Dudamel Conducts a John Williams Celebration With the LA Phil
- Vienna Philharmonic Summer Night Concert 2015

=== Season 43 (2015–16) ===
- Billy Elliot the Musical Live
- Chita Rivera: A Lot of Livin' to Do
- Andrea Bocelli: Cinema
- From Vienna: The New Year's Celebration 2016 hosted by Julie Andrews (January 1, 2016)
- Joan Baez 75th Birthday Celebration
- Vienna Philharmonic Summer Night Concert 2016

=== Season 44 (2016–17) ===
- Grammy Salute to Music Legends (October 14, 2016)
- Hamilton's America with Lin-Manuel Miranda (October 21, 2016)
- Gypsy (November 11, 2016)
- The Hollow Crown: Henry VI, Part I (December 16, 2016)
- The Hollow Crown: Henry VI, Part II (December 18, 2016)
- The Hollow Crown: Richard III (December 25, 2016)
- From Vienna: The New Year's Celebration 2017 hosted by Julie Andrews (January 1, 2017)
- Bel Canto the Opera (January 13, 2017)
- Alicia Keys – Landmarks Live in Concert: A Great Performances Special
- Brad Paisley – Landmarks Live in Concert: A Great Performances Special
- New York City Ballet in Paris (February 17, 2017)
- New York City Ballet Symphony in C (February 24, 2017)
- Dudamel Conducts Tangos Under the Stars with the LA Phil (March 30, 2017)
- Young Men, a ballet by BalletBoyz
- GP at the Met: Romeo et Juliette (April 13, 2017)
- GP at the Met: Nabucco (May 7, 2017)
- GP at the Met: Rusalka (June 18, 2017)
- Andrea Bocelli – Landmarks Live in Concert (June 30, 2017)
- Vienna Philharmonic Summer Night Concert 2017

=== Season 45 (2017–18) ===
- Havana Time Machine (October 6, 2017)
- Grammy Music Legends 2017 (October 13, 2017)
- She Loves Me (October 20, 2017)
- Noël Coward's Present Laughter (November 3, 2017)
- Foo Fighters Landmarks Live in Concert: A Great Performances Special (November 10, 2017)
- Indecent (November 17, 2017)
- Irving Berlin's Holiday Inn (November 24, 2017)
- The Moody Blues: Days of Future Passed Live (November 25, 2017)
- From Vienna: The New Year's Celebration 2018 hosted by Hugh Bonneville (January 1, 2018)
- GP at the Met: Norma (January 26, 2018)
- Nas Live from the Kennedy Center: Classical Hip Hop (February 2, 2018)
- Movies For Grownups Awards with AARP the Magazine (February 23, 2018)
- GP at the Met: The Exterminating Angel (March 25, 2018)
- Will.i.am and Friends featuring the Black Eyed Peas– Landmarks Live in Concert: A Great Performances Special (April 20, 2018)
- GP at the Met: L'Elisir D'Amore (April 29, 2018)
- The Opera House
- GP at the Met: Tosca
- Ellis Island: The Dream of America with Pacific Symphony
- GP at the Met: Semiramide
- GP at the Met: Così fan tutte
- The Chris Botti Band in Concert
- Chicago Voices
- GP at the Met: Luisa Miller
- Vienna Philharmonic Summer Night Concert 2018
- GP at the Met: Cendrillon

=== Season 46 (2018–19) ===
- Grammy Salute to Music Legends 2018 (October 5, 2018)
- An American in Paris The Musical
- John Leguizamo's Road to Broadway
- The Sound of Music Live (November 9, 2018)
- Michael Bublé: Tour Stop 148
- Harold Prince: The Director's Life
- Tony Bennett & Diana Krall: Love is Here to Stay
- k.d. lang – Landmarks Live in Concert: A Great Performances Special
- Leonard Bernstein Centennial Celebration at Tanglewood
- From Vienna: The New Year's Celebration 2019 hosted by Hugh Bonneville (January 1, 2019)
- The Cleveland Orchestra Centennial Celebration
- Orphée et Eurydice From Lyric Opera of Chicago
- Movies for Grownups Awards 2019 With AARP the Magazine
- Doubt From Minnesota Opera
- Great Performances at the Met: Marnie
- Julius Caesar from Donmar
- Andrea Bocelli @ 60
- Joni 75: A Birthday Celebration
- Birgit Nilsson: A League of Her Own
- Great Performances at the Met: Samson Et Dalila
- Great Performances at the Met: La Traviata
- Vienna Philharmonic Summer Night Concert 2019 (August 9, 2018)

=== Season 47 (2019–2020) ===
- Now Hear This "Vivaldi: Something Completely Different" (September 20, 2019)
- Now Hear This "The Riddle of the Bach" (September 27, 2019)
- Now Hear This "Scarlatti: Man Out of Time" (October 4, 2019)
- Now Hear This "Handel: Italian Style" (October 11, 2019)
- GRAMMY Salute to Music Legends (October 18, 2019)
- Broadway's Best: 42nd Street (November 1, 2019)
- Broadway's Best: Rodger & Hammerstein's The King and I (November 8, 2019)
- Broadway's Best: Red (November 15, 2019)
- Broadway's Best: Much Ado About Nothing (November 22, 2019)
- Broadway's Best: Kinky Boots (November 29, 2019)
- Broadway's Best: Jesus Christ Superstar Live in Concert (November 30, 2019)
- An Intimate Evening with David Foster (November 30, 2019)
- From Vienna; The New Year's Celebration 2020 hosted by Hugh Bonneville (January 1, 2020)
- Great Performances at the Met: Manon (January 5, 2020)
- Movies for Grownup Awards with AARP The Magazine 2020 (January 19, 2020)
- Great Performances at the Met: Madama Butterfly (February 2, 2020)
- Great Performances at the Met: Turandot (March 20, 2020)
- Great Performances at the Met: Akhnaten (April 5, 2020)
- Andrea Bocelli: Music for Hope (April 14, 2020)
- Great Performances at the Met: Wozzeck (May 3, 2020)
- LA Phil 100 (May 8, 2020)
- Chicago Symphony Orchestra: Leonard Bernstein's 'Mass' (May 15, 2020)
- Great Performances at the Met: Agrippina (June 7, 2020)
- Ann (June 19, 2020)
- Gloria: A Life (June 26, 2020)
- Great Performances at the Met: Der Fliegende Holländer (July 5, 2020)
- Great Performances at the Met: The Gershwins' Porgy and Bess (July 17, 2020)
- Great Performances at the Met: Tosca (August 2, 2020)
- Great Performances at the Met: Maria Stuarda (September 6, 2020)

=== Season 48 (2020–21) ===
- Romeo & Juliet (September 11, 2020)
- Now Hear This "Haydn: The King of Strings" (September 18, 2020)
- Now Hear This: The Schubert Generation (September 25, 2020)
- Now Hear This: Becoming Mozart (October 2, 2020)
- GRAMMY Salute to Music Legends (October 16, 2020)
- One Man, Two Guvnors (November 6, 2020)
- Fiddler: Miracle of Miracles (November 13, 2020)
- Irving Berlin's Holiday Inn (November 20, 2020)
- Lea Salonga In Concert (November 27, 2020)
- From Vienna; The New Year's Celebration 2021 hosted by Hugh Bonneville (January 1, 2021)

=== Season 49 (2021–22) ===
- Yannick -- An Artist's Journey (September 3, 2021)
- Verdi's Requiem: The Met Remembers 9/11 (September 11, 2021)
- The Red Shoes (September 17, 2021)
- Great Performances at the Met: Sondra Radvanovsky & Piotr Beczala in Concert (October 1, 2021)
- Great Performances at the Met: Three Divas at Versailles (October 8, 2021)
- Now Hear This: Beethoven's Ghost (October 29, 2021)
- Great Performances at the Met: Wagnerians in Concert (November 5, 2021)
- A John Williams Premiere at Tanglewood (November 12, 2021)
- San Francisco Symphony Reopening Night (November 19, 2021)
- Coppelia (November 26, 2021)
- Unforgettable... with Love (November 27, 2021)
- Great Performances at the Met: Bryn Terfel & Friends in Concert (December 3, 2021)
- Great Performances at the Met: New Year's Eve Gala (December 31, 2021)
- From Vienna; The New Year's Celebration 2022 hosted by Hugh Bonneville (January 1, 2022)
- Reopening: The Broadway Revival (January 18, 2022)
- Great Performances at the Met: Boris Godunov (March 4, 2022)
- Great Performances at the Met: Eurydice (March 6, 2022)
- Movies for Grownups Awards With AARP the Magazine (March 18, 2022)
- The Conductor (March 25, 2022)
- Great Performances at the Met: Fire Shut Up in My Bones (April 1, 2022)
- Now Hear This: Amy Beach Rise to Prominence (April 8, 2022)
- Now Hear This "Florence Price and the American Migration"(April 15, 2022)
- Now Hear This: Aaron Copland/ Dean of American Music (April 22, 2022)
- Now Hear This: "New American Voices" (April 29, 2022)
- Great Performances at the Met: Cinderella (May 8, 2022)
- Anything Goes (May 13, 2022)
- Merry Wives (May 20, 2022)
- Keeping Company with Sondheim (May 27, 2022)
- Great Performances at the Met: Rigoletto (June 17, 2022)
- Great Performances at the Met: Ariadne Auf Naxos (July 3, 2022)
- Great Performances at the Met: Don Carlos (August 7, 2022)
- Vienna Philharmonic Summer Night Concert 2022 (August 26, 2022)
- Great Performances at the Met: Turandot (September 4, 2022)

=== Season 50 (2022–23) ===
- Black Lucy and The Bard (September 16, 2022)
- Intimate Apparel (September 23, 2022)
- Great Performances at the Met: Lucia Di Lammermoor (October 2, 2022)
- NY Phil Reopening of David Geffen Hall (November 4, 2022)
- Great Performances at the Met: Hamlet (November 6, 2022)
- Josh Groban's Great Big Radio City Show (November 25, 2022)
- From Vienna; The New Year's Celebration 2023 hosted by Hugh Bonneville (January 1, 2023)
- Movies for Grownups Awards 2023 with AARP The Magazine (February 17, 2023)
- The Magic of Spirituals (February 24, 2023)
- Remember This (March 13, 2023)
- Great Performances at the Met: The Hours (March 17, 2023)
- Great Performances at the Met: La Traviata (April 2, 2023)
- Now Hear This “Piazzolla’s History with Tango” (April 7, 2023)
- Now Hear This “Schumann: Genius and Madness” (April 14, 2023)
- Now Hear This “Andy Akiho Found (his) Sound” (April 21, 2023)
- Now Hear This “Albéniz: Portraits of Spain” (April 28, 2023)
- Great Performances at the Met: Fedora (May 7, 2023)
- Celebrating 50 Years of Broadway's Best (May 12, 2023)
- Richard III (May 19, 2023; recorded in July 2022 in Central Park)
- Great Performances at the Met: Medea (June 16, 2023)
- Great Performances at the Met: Lohengrin (July 9, 2023)
- Great Performances at the Met: Falstaff (August 6, 2023)
- Leonard Bernstein's Kaddish Symphony (August 21, 2023)
- Vienna Philharmonic Summer Night Concert 2023 (August 25, 2023)

=== Season 51 (2023–24) ===
- Great Performances at the Met: Der Rosenkavalier (September 10, 2023)
- Great Performances at the Met: Don Giovanni (October 1, 2023)
- New York City Ballet in Madrid (October 27, 2023)
- Message in a Bottle (November 3, 2023)
- Great Performances at the Met: Champion (November 5, 2023)
- Great Performances at the Met: Die Zauberflote (December 10, 2023)
- From Vienna; The New Year's Celebration 2024 hosted by Hugh Bonneville (January 1, 2024)
- Great Performances at the Met: The Life and Times of Malcolm X (February 4, 2024)
- The LA Phil Celebrates Frank Gehry (February 16, 2024)
- George Jones Tribute: Still Playin’ Possum (February 23, 2024)
- Great Performances at the Met: Dead Man Walking (March 15, 2024)
- Great Performances at the Met: Florencia en el Amazonas (April 7, 2024)
- Now Hear This "Rising Stars" (April 12, 2024)
- Now Hear This "Virtuosos" (April 19, 2024)
- Now Hear This "Old Friends" (April 26, 2024)
- Now Hear This "The Composer is Yoo" (May 3, 2024)
- Great Performances at the Met: Nabucco (May 5, 2024)
- Hamlet (May 10, 2024)
- Audra McDonald at the London Palladium (May 17, 2024)
- Purlie Victorious (May 24, 2024)
- Rodgers & Hammerstein's 80th Anniversary (May 31, 2024)

=== Season 52 (2024–25) ===
- Émigré: A Musical Drama with the NY Philharmonic (October 25, 2024)
- Land of Gold (a documentary by Jon H. Else about the production of John Adams's Girls of the Golden West) (November 1, 2024)
- Patsy Cline: Walkin' After Midnight (November 22, 2024)
- Henry Mancini 100 at the Hollywood Bowl (November 29, 2024)
- From Vienna; The New Year's Celebration 2025 hosted by Hugh Bonneville (January 1, 2025)
- Movies for Grownups with AARP the Magazine 2025 (February 23, 2025)
- Andrea Bocelli 30th -- The Celebration (February 28, 2025)
- Great Performances at the Met: Grounded (March 21, 2025)
- Now Hear This "Chopin's Polish Heart" (April 11, 2025)
- The Magic of Nureyev (April 11, 2025)
- Great Performances at the Met: Les Contes d'Hoffman (April 13, 2025)
- Now Hear This "Boccherini: Night Music" (April 18, 2025)
- Now Hear This "Rachmaninoff Reborn" (April 25, 2025)
- Now Hear This "Barrios: Chopin of the Guitar" (May 2, 2025)
- Next to Normal (May 9, 2025)
- Yellow Face (May 16, 2025)
- Great Performances at the Met: Tosca (May 18, 2025)
- Girl from the North Country (May 23, 2025)
- Kiss Me, Kate (May 30, 2025)
- Great Performances at the Met: Aida (June 13, 2025)
- Great Performances at the Met: Fidelio (July 13, 2025)
- Great Performances at the Met: Le Nozze di Figaro (August 17, 2025)
- Vienna Philharmonic Summer Night Concert 2025 (August 29, 2025)
- Great Performances at the Met: Salome (September 14, 2025)

=== Season 53 (2025–26) ===
- The Magic of Grace Bumbry (October 3, 2025)
- Great Performances at the Met: Il Barbiere di Siviglia (October 19, 2025)
- Tiler Peck: Suspending Time (November 7, 2025)
- Twelfth Night (from Shakespeare in the Park (November 14, 2025)
- Nutcracker from English National Ballet (December 16, 2025)
- From Vienna; The New Year's Celebration 2026 hosted by Hugh Bonneville (January 1, 2026)
- Movies for Grownups Awards 2026 hosted by Alan Cumming (February 22, 2026)
- Samara Joy at Royal Albert Hall (February 27, 2026)
- Great Performances at the Met: La Bohème (March 20, 2026)
- Great Performances at the Met: The Amazing Adventures of Kavalier & Clay (April 1, 2026)
- Now Hear This "Brahms: Free but Alone" (April 10, 2026)
- Great Performances at the Met: La Sonnambula (April 12, 2026)
- Now Hear This "Everyone Loves Joplin" (April 17, 2026)
- Now Hear This "The Call of Istanbul" (April 24, 2026)
- Now Hear This "The Iceland Sound" (May 1, 2026)
- Josh Groban: An Intimate Evening at The Union Chapel (May 8, 2026)
- Suffs (May 8, 2026)
- Irving Berlin's Top Hat (Chichester Festival Theatre revival) (May 15, 2026)
- Great Performances at the Met: Arabella (May 17, 2026)
- An Evening with Nicole Scherzinger (May 22, 2026)
- Great Performances at the Met: I Puritani (July 12, 2026)

=== Season 54 (2026–27) ===
- Great Performances at the Met: Tristan und Isolde
- Great Performances at the Met: El Último Sueño de Frida y Diego
- Tammy Wynette: Forever Yours
- Jimmy Webb: American Songwriter
- Romeo & Juliet (Shakespeare in the Park
- Dudamel Conducts the New York Philharmonic
- AARP Movies & TV for Grownups Awards 2027
