= Ben Wheeler, Texas =

Ben Wheeler
- Unincorporated community Census designated place
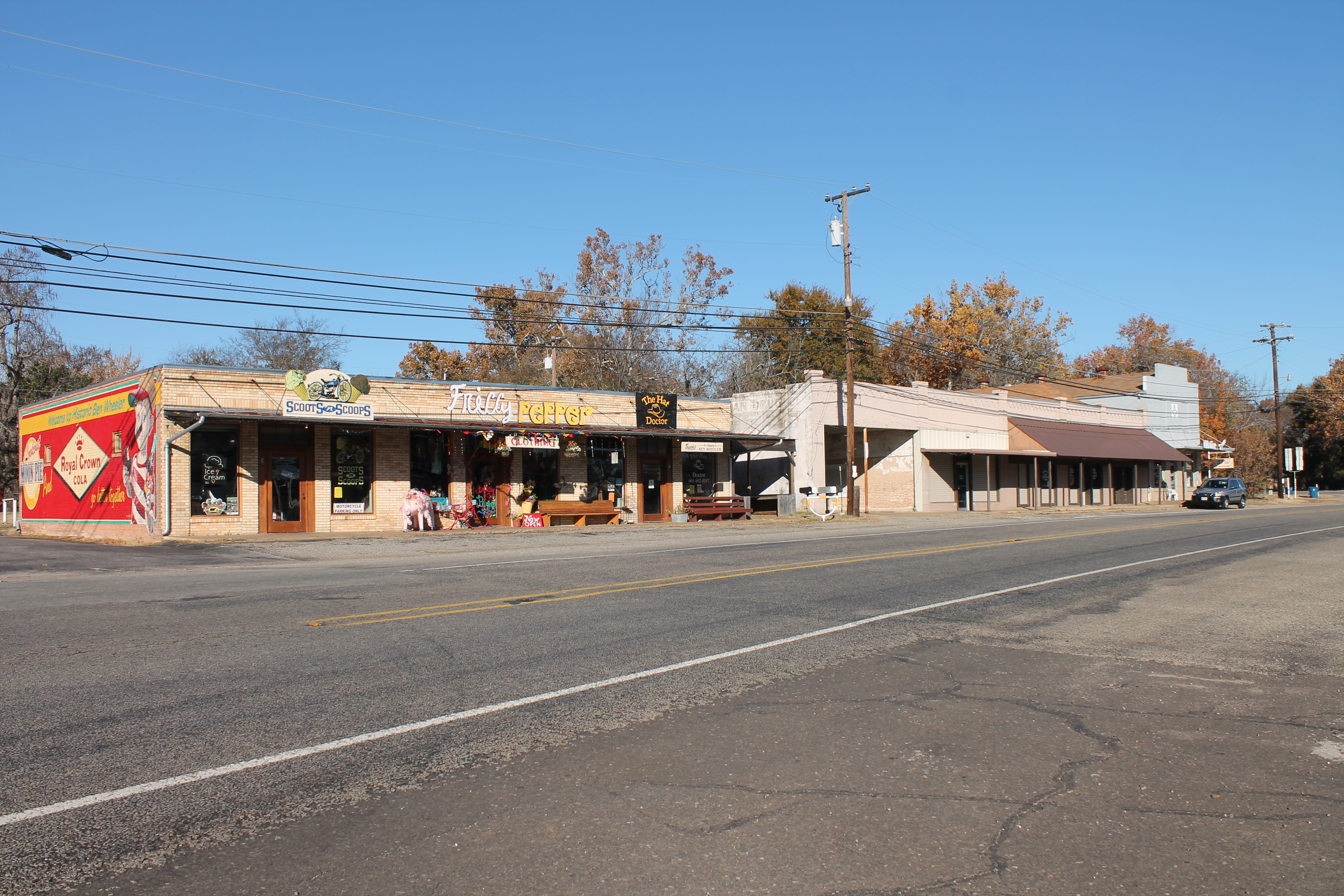
- Motto: Ben Wheeler Matters!
- Location within the state of Texas Ben Wheeler (the United States)
- Coordinates: 32°26′46″N 95°42′09″W
- Country: United States
- State: Texas
- County: Van Zandt

Area
  - Total: 3.02 sq mi (7.81 km^{2})
  - Land: 3.00 sq mi (7.77 km^{2})
  - Water: 0.015 sq mi (0.04 km^{2})
- Elevation: 518 ft (158 m)

Population (2020)
  - Total: 456
  - Density: 152/sq mi (58.7/km^{2})
- Time zone: UTC-6 (Central (CST))
  - Summer (DST): UTC-5 (CDT)
- ZIP codes: 75754
- Area codes: 430, 903
- FIPS code: 48-07708
- GNIS feature ID: 2805846

Ben Wheeler is an unincorporated community and census designated place (CDP) in Van Zandt County, Texas, United States. As of the 2020 census, Ben Wheeler had a population of 456. It lies twelve miles southeast of Canton.

== History ==
The area around Ben Wheeler was first settled in the 1840s by Kentucky farmer Benjamin F. Wheeler. Originally known as Clough, after prominent local farmer George W. Clough, the community was renamed Ben Wheeler in 1878 after the town's post office was relocated to the present townsite. The community was beset by many hardships in its early years, including an 1893 fire which destroyed most of the town's businesses. By 1896, the population reached 500, but disaster struck again by way of a smallpox epidemic that reduced the number of residents to 238 by 1904. Somewhat insulated from the effects of the Great Depression by the East Texas Oil Boom, Ben Wheeler had 18 businesses and a population of 375 in 1943. As the oil boom subsided and area cotton production fell, however, Ben Wheeler began a decline which led to the closing of all but nine area businesses by 1972, and the consolidation of its schools with those in nearby Van. By 1988, however, buoyed by the growth of nearby Tyler and Canton, the number of operating businesses in Ben Wheeler had risen to twenty-two and in 2000 the community was home to an estimated 400 residents.

=== 2011 tornado ===
On Wednesday, April 27, 2011, a moderate tornado with sustained winds of 90-100 mph struck the communities of Ben Wheeler and Edom, Texas. Three structures were destroyed and upwards of another one hundred structures damaged.

== Education ==
Ben Wheeler is served by the Van Independent School District.

== Restoration and Revival ==
Brooks and Rese Gremmels started the Ben Wheeler Arts & Historic District Foundation. It is a non-profit 501 (c) (3) corporation, designed to restore old buildings and shops in downtown Ben Wheeler.

== Annual Feral Hog Festival ==
Every year, on the fourth weekend in October, the community celebrates their feral hog population with festivities held downtown. Events include a parade and hog queen contest, as well as many other activities and food provided by local businesses.

== Climate ==
The climate in this area is characterized by hot, humid summers and generally mild to cool winters. According to the Köppen Climate Classification system, Ben Wheeler has a humid subtropical climate, abbreviated "Cfa" on climate maps.

== Demographics ==
Historical population
Census	Pop.	Note	%±
2020	456		—
U.S. Decennial Census; 1850–1900 1910; 1920 1930 1940; 1950 1960 1970; 1980 1990 2000; 2010 2020

Ben Wheeler first appeared as a census designated place in the 2020 U.S. census.

=== 2020 census ===
Ben Wheeler CDP, Texas – Racial and ethnic composition Note: the US Census treats Hispanic/Latino as an ethnic category. This table excludes Latinos from the racial categories and assigns them to a separate category. Hispanics/Latinos may be of any race.
Race / Ethnicity (NH = Non-Hispanic)	Pop 2020	% 2020
White alone (NH)	345	75.66%
Black or African American alone (NH)	3	0.66%
Native American or Alaska Native alone (NH)	5	1.10%
Asian alone (NH)	0	0.00%
Native Hawaiian or Pacific Islander alone (NH)	2	0.44%
Other race alone (NH)	0	0.00%
Mixed race or Multiracial (NH)	15	3.29%
Hispanic or Latino (any race)	86	18.86%
Total	456	100.00%
