= David Lunceford =

American football player (1934–2009)

No. 73
- Position: Tackle

Personal information
- Born: May 6, 1934; Canton, Texas, U.S.
- Died: May 23, 2009 (aged 75); Tyler, Texas, U.S.
- Listed height: 6 ft 4 in (1.93 m)
- Listed weight: 240 lb (109 kg)

Career information
- High school: Van High School (Van, Texas)
- College: Baylor
- NFL draft: 1956: 8th round, 90th overall pick

Career history
- Chicago Cardinals (1957)
- Stats at Pro Football Reference

David Glenn Lunceford (May 6, 1934 – May 23, 2009) was an American offensive lineman who played football for Baylor University and for the Chicago Cardinals of the National Football League (NFL).

== Biography ==
Lunceford grew up in Tyler, Texas, graduating from Van High School in 1952 and lettering in three sports. After a year at Tyler Junior College, he was recruited by Baylor, where he lettered in all three seasons (1954–1956), playing both offensive and defensive tackle. He appeared in both of Baylor's bowl games during that period: the 1954 Gator Bowl and the 1957 Sugar Bowl, in which Baylor upset the undefeated Tennessee Volunteers 13–7.

Lunceford was drafted by the Chicago Cardinals in 1957. He played offensive tackle for all 12 games in 1957. Injuries ended his career before the start of the 1958 season.

After the NFL, Lunceford returned to his native Tyler and went to work in the oil industry, starting with Humble Oil and Refining, which later merged with Standard Oil of New Jersey (which ultimately became Exxon). He retired from Exxon in 1992, and he continued to work as a management consultant thereafter, as well as serving in various capacities in Tyler for his church, the community, and the local junior college.

Lunceford died on May 23, 2009, from complications of Alzheimer's disease.
