= Providence Black Repertory Company =

Former non profit organization

The Providence Black Repertory Company (Black Rep) was a 501c3 non profit arts organization based in Providence, Rhode Island, USA. It offered programming inspired by the cultural traditions of the African Diaspora in Theater, Education, and Public Programs. It operated from 1996 till 2009.

== History ==
Founded in 1996 by Artistic/Executive Director Donald W. King, and Chairman Michael S. Van Leesten, The Providence Black Repertory Company grew from a public program at AS220 called Xxodus Presents Miss Fannie's Soul Food Kitchen. Black Rep produced its first stage production, The Island, on the third floor of a former print shop on Washington St. in Downcity Providence.

Ten years later, Black Rep was located at 276 Westminster St. in a facility that includes performance and rehearsal space as well as a café and lounge. Black Rep offers programming such as a Latin Jazz series, drumming workshops for youth, premiers of new American plays, and Sound Session, a music festival produced in partnership with The City of Providence's Department of Art, Culture & Tourism. Across the three program areas Black Rep contextualizes artistic work through humanities panels, discussions, printed materials, and outreach.

In 2006, Black Rep celebrated its 10th anniversary as a Downcity Providence cultural institution.

According to a 2/1/2010 article published in the Providence Journal, "Established in 1996, the Black Rep was closed in December 2009 after the organization failed to keep a positive cash flow. The group was granted a hardship request to throw its annual New Year’s Eve party, in the hopes that revenue from the event could have helped pay off some debt. It wasn’t enough...".

== Theater ==
The Theater experience at the Black Rep is informed by an approach that places the deliberate investigation of cultural, social, historical and political consciousness and conscience at the center of the creative process. Each season includes three mainstage productions and three readings of new American plays through the First Look Reading Series for plays in development. Mainstage productions have included plays by Amiri Baraka, Aisha Rahman, Athol Fugard, Federico García Lorca, Harold Pinter, Sam Shepard, Cheryl West, María Irene Fornés, and August Wilson, as well as original stage adaptations of the poetry of Langston Hughes and Kevin Young (poet). Each December, The Black Rep's Affiliate Artist company develops a workshop production showcasing its own work in process while providing a chance for audiences to be part of its development.

== Public Programs ==
Black Rep's Public Programs present live music, poetry, and other performance-based art of the African Diaspora six nights a week in the Xxodus Café. Each week night of public programming is informed by a particular musical tradition of the African Diaspora. Monday is Polyphonic, an open mic for artists working in forms of musical expression deriving from the Blues (Hip Hop, Acoustic Solo, Rock etc.). Tuesday is Maroon Society, Black Rep's Caribbean Culture series where selectors spin Reggae, Dub, Ska, and Dancehall. Wednesday is Latin Jazz & Salsa. Thursdays is Afro-Sonic, a Deep House night with live West African drumming. Friday is Ecclection, a night for Hip Hop, R&B, Funk and Soul. Saturday is the Neon Soul Cabaret, which plays host to Black Rep's house band, Neon Soul Collective - a group indebted to the various styles of music played in the café throughout the week. Each season of Public Programs culminates with Providence Sound Session, a genre-defying summer music festival co-produced with The City of Providence's Department of Art, Culture & Tourism.

== Education ==
Each season is accompanied by Education programs, including student matinees, in-school residencies, and after-school workshops. Artist Educators bring Black Rep's interdisciplinary approach into the community through workshops in music, dance, theater, poetry and video production. Teaching methodologies stress collaboration and value students’ cultural heritage and experience, with the goal of developing youth and adults who recognize the importance and power of the art and culture of the African Diaspora and embrace the values of community and democracy that are part of these traditions.

== Artist Development ==
Black Rep is committed to Artist Development, offering opportunities for musicians and performers to participate in master classes, workshops, and career development activities. At Black Rep, local artists have an opportunity to network, share resources, and build their careers through employment. Artists who look to the organization to provide them with creative opportunities come from many different places of cultural origin. Almost 86% are locally or regionally based in Rhode Island and Southeastern New England, 11% are based in New York, and 3% are based in other states, or internationally. The company has attracted artists from Nigeria and Trinidad and Tobago. Local artists who have worked at Black Rep identify as African-American, Haitian, Cape Verdean, Hispanic/Latino, Caribbean, Native American, Caucasian/White, Mixed Heritage and Filipino.

== Partnerships ==
The Black Rep had partnerships and collaborations with local cultural and educational institutions including Brown University’s Rites and Reason Theatre and Rhode Island College’s MFA Program in Performance and Society. Collaborative projects include new play development, co-production, and mentoring of young artists.

== Awards and recognition ==
The John F. Kennedy Center for the Performing Arts in Washington D.C. recently invited Black Rep to join their Capacity Building Program for Culturally Specific Performing Arts Organizations. Other recognition includes the 2004 Arts & Business Council of RI Jabez Gorham Award for Most Outstanding Arts Organization, 2003 New England Theatre Conference Regional Award for Outstanding Achievement in American Theatre, and the 2003 Citizens Bank Community Champion Award (in Education).
