= ANTA Washington Square Theatre =

Former theater in Manhattan, New York

- Interactive map of ANTA Washington Square Theatre
- Address: 40 West 4th Street; New York City; United States
- Coordinates: 40.7291°N 73.9963°W
- Owner: New York University
- Capacity: 1,158
- Type: Broadway-like

Construction
- Opened: 1963
- Demolished: 1968
- Architects: Eero Saarinen (building) and Jo Mielziner (theater)

Tenant
- American National Theater and Academy (ANTA)

The ANTA Washington Square Theatre was a theatre located on 40 West Fourth Street, in Greenwich Village, Manhattan, New York City. It was run by the American National Theater and Academy (ANTA) and initial home to the Repertory Theatre of Lincoln Center from early 1964 to the completion of the Vivian Beaumont Theater in 1965. The theatre, not to be confused with the ANTA Theatre (later August Wilson Theatre) on 52nd Street, was located away from the mainstream Broadway district. Closed in 1968, it used a thrust stage tilted toward the audience, with the audience sitting on three sides of it. It did not employ the use of a curtain.

Robert Whitehead founded ANTA to create "a national theatre as a guiding spirit". He needed a location, as he had both a company of actors and commissioned two playwrights (Arthur Miller & S. N. Behrman), and he needed one quickly. New York University leased land to them, with ANTA having to foot the bill, an estimated $525,000. Marvin Carlson described the theatre as "characterless steel box, about 20 feet high and more or less square, painted a mustard yellow and from the outside, suggesting a warehouse or storage facility. The simple entrance had a marquee bearing the name ANTA". The theatre, which was not intended to be permanent, had a seating capacity of 1,158, and opened in 1963 with previews of Miller's After the Fall. Another observer praised "the fine acoustics that have been achieved by the creation of irregularly surfaced concave walls." However, that same observer noted that "the interior of the building is not striking and might well be mistaken for a small industrial plant of some sort."

Several highly regarded plays had their runs at the ANTA Washington Square, including Miller's Incident at Vichy and the revival of Eugene O'Neill's Marco Millions. A production relished by many Molière lovers was William Ball's 1964 staging of Tartuffe, with an "outrageous" Michael O'Sullivan in the title role. The longest running show to play at the ANTA Washington Square was the smash hit musical Man of La Mancha, which began its first New York run there on November 22, 1965. Man of La Mancha's producers Albert W. Selden and Hal James took over the theater in 1966. The theater closed permanently on March 17, 1968, and Man of La Mancha transferred to the more conventional Martin Beck Theatre in 1968, pending the demolition of the Washington Square Theatre.

The dismantled pieces of the prefabricated theatre were purchased by Yale University for the Trinity Repertory Company, one which artistic director Adrian Hall later called "bold, silly move". It was done as a way to save costs on construction, but it never materialized. Yale ended up purchasing the Majestic Theatre in downtown Providence, currently home to Trinity Repertory Company.

== Productions ==
- 1964: After the Fall
- 1964: Marco Millions
- 1964: But for Whom Charlie
- 1964: The Changeling
- 1964: Incident at Vichy
- 1965: Tartuffe
- 1965: Man of La Mancha
