= Marco Millions =

Marco Millions is a play by Eugene O'Neill about Marco Polo.

== History ==
O'Neill first envisioned Marco Millions while doing research for his 1923 play The Fountain.

It premiered on Broadway at the Guild Theatre on January 9, 1928, with Alfred Lunt as Marco. It ran there for 92 performances, closing in March 1928. The original production was staged by Rouben Mamoulian and used incidental music composed by Emerson Whithorne. Max Weiser served as music director. Lee Simonson designed both the sets and the costumes, the latter of which were manufactured by the Helene Pons Studio. The play was subsequently revived on Broadway in 1930 at the Liberty Theatre and in 1964 at the ANTA Washington Square Theatre. The 1964 production received two nominations at the 18th Tony Awards.

A 1939 BBC television film was made starring Griffith Jones as Marco.
