= YASI =

The Young Actors Summer Institute (YASI) is an arts enrichment summer program in New England. Held annually since 2005 at the Tony Award-winning Trinity Repertory Company, in Providence, Rhode Island, YASI is taught by the theater's resident acting company and education staff. Students are able to choose from a variety of different classes, including playwriting, painting and drawing, improvisation, Shakespeare, film and more.

== Structure ==
YASI takes place during the month of July and culminates in performances featuring scene, monologues and musical theater selections. The program usually lasts five weeks, excluding weekends and holidays. The first week starts participants with age appropriate improv games and an "audition day"; and the last week is spent in rehearsal for a final showcase.

Normal days are divided into four elective blocks and one extended period of time used for mandatory scene study, rehearsal or learning about the technical aspects of theater. The elective blocks are varied in subject matter and range from yoga to improvisation to playwriting.

In addition to the final showcase performances, there is also a full length production of a Shakepearean play done by the high school students in the 'YASI Shakes' program.

In the summer of 2011, a new mini camp was created called YASI Jr. YASI Jr. is a 5-day program giving kids too young for YASI a chance to experience what it's like to be at YASI.

== Participant Life ==
In addition to normal classes, many extra events occur. Musical or theatrical guests often come to perform. Every year, there has been a rock-paper-scissors tournament and a game called "Boom Roasted". There is also a Lip Sync Battle every year and the winner(s) get to smash a piece of art filled with cream.

=== Awards ===
There are daily prizes, which vary from day to day, awarded to the attendees who have helped throughout the day in various ways such as cleaning up during lunch and snack, or helping the counselors and teaching artists. At the end of the program, special participants are recognized with induction to the Gryffindor club (an homage to Gryffindor of Harry Potter).
