= Trinity Repertory Company =

Theater company and theater in Providence, Rhode Island

- Trinity Rep
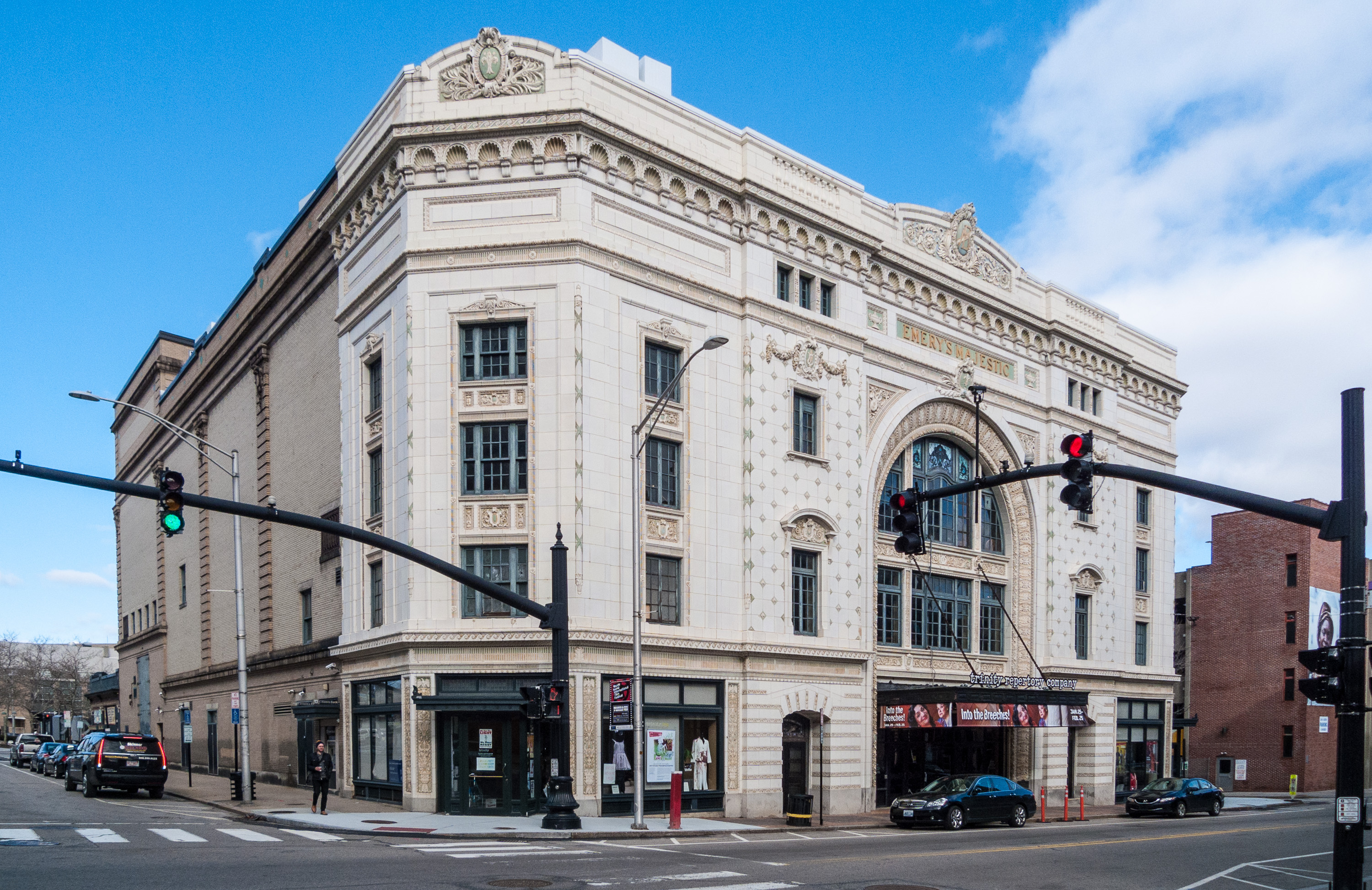

- Location within Rhode Island Location within the United States
- Former names: Emery's Majestic Theatre
- Address: 201 Washington Street
- Location: Providence, Rhode Island, US
- Coordinates: 41°49′19″N 71°25′1″W
- Owner: The Foundation for Repertory Theater of Rhode Island, Inc.
- Capacity: Chace Theater: 500; Dowling Theater: 300
- Type: Regional theatre

Construction
- Opened: March 21, 1963

Website
- www.trinityrep.com
- Trinity Square Repertory Theatre
- U.S. National Register of Historic Places
- U.S. Historic district – Contributing property
- Built: 1917
- Architect: William R. Walker & Son
- Architectural style: Beaux Arts
- Part of: Downtown Providence Historic District (ID84001967)
- NRHP reference No.: 72000004

Significant dates
- Added to NRHP: June 5, 1972
- Designated CP: February 10, 1984

Trinity Repertory Company (commonly abbreviated as Trinity Rep) is a non-profit regional theater located at 201 Washington Street in Providence, Rhode Island. The theater is a member of the League of Resident Theatres. Founded in 1963, the theater is "one of the most respected regional theatres in the country". Featuring the last longstanding Resident Acting Company in the U.S., Trinity Rep presents a balance of world premiere, contemporary, and classic works, including an annual production of A Christmas Carol, for an estimated annual audience of 110,000. In its 52-year history, the theater has produced nearly 67 world premieres, mounted national and international tours and, through its MFA program, trained hundreds of new actors and directors. Project Discovery, Trinity Rep's pioneering educational outreach program launched in 1966, annually introduces over 15,000 Rhode Island, Massachusetts, and Connecticut high school students to live theater through matinees as well as in-school residencies and workshops (See: YASI). As of 2016, Trinity Rep's educational programs serve students in around 60% of Rhode Island schools, and it has a 9 million USD annual budget.

== History ==
Trinity Rep was founded when a small group of Rhode Island citizens sought to create a professional resident theater company in Providence. Incorporated as "The Foundation for Repertory Theater of Rhode Island, Inc." on March 21, 1963, the group hired Adrian Hall, a New York-based director originally from Texas. At Trinity United Methodist Church, located in Trinity Square, the first production The Hostage by Brendan Behan, opened on March 14, 1964. In 1968, Trinity Rep performed at the Edinburgh International Festival in Scotland, the first American theater company to do so. The company received the Tony Award for Outstanding Regional Theater Company in 1981, produced four television productions for PBS, toured India and Syria, and has a strong commitment to the development of new works.

The Trinity Rep Conservatory opened in 1977, serving as a training ground for actors. A partnership in 2001 between Trinity Rep and Brown University created the Brown/Trinity Rep three-year MFA program for degrees in theatrical arts for actors and directors. Operating along with the MFA playwriting, it has emerged as one of the nation's best theater conservatories, continuously ranked top-five schools with NYU, Yale, Juilliard and ACT.

The conservatory pre Brown Consortium did not maintain records of graduates.

The dismantled pieces of the prefabricated ANTA Washington Square Theatre were purchased by Yale University for the Trinity Repertory Company, one which artistic director Adrian Hall later called a "bold, silly move". It was done a way to save costs on construction, but it never materialized.

From its roots in Providence's Trinity United Methodist Church, Trinity Repertory Company moved in 1973 to its present home the Lederer Theater Center in downtown Providence. Formerly a historical vaudeville performance house known as the Emery Majestic Theatre, the historic building houses two performance spaces: the 500-plus seat Chace Theater and the 300-seat Dowling Theater, as well as offices, production shops, and rehearsal halls. The building is listed on the National Register of Historic Places.

== Artistic directors ==
- Adrian Hall (1963–1989)
- Anne Bogart (1989–1990)
- Richard Jenkins (1990–1994)
- Oskar Eustis (1994–2005)
- Amanda Dehnert (2005–2006, Acting Artistic Director)
- Curt Columbus (January 2006 – present)

== Pell Awards ==
Trinity Repertory has held the Pell Awards since 1997. The awards are named for Rhode Island Senator Claiborne Pell, a patron of the arts who was instrumental in the founding of the National Endowment for the Arts. Awards are given for lifetime achievement, distinguished achievement in the arts, New England excellence in the arts, and leadership in the arts. The event also serves as a fundraiser for the theater.

Winners of the Pell Awards have included Ruby Dee, Ossie Davis, Viola Davis, Robert Redford, John Krasinski, and Debra Messing; Rhode Island award winners have included Richard Jenkins, Rose Weaver, Umberto Crenca, John Chan and Len Cabral.

== See also ==
- National Register of Historic Places listings in Providence, Rhode Island
