= Van Independent School District =

School district in Texas

Location
- Van, Texas United States

District information
- Type: Public School
- Grades: PK-12
- Superintendent: Don Dunn

Students and staff
- Athletic conference: UIL Class 4A
- District mascot: Vandals
- Colors: Red & White

Other information
- Website: www.vanisd.org

Van Independent School District is a public school district based in Van, Texas (USA).

In addition to Van, the district serves the city of Edom and the unincorporated community of Ben Wheeler. The district also serves a portion of western Smith County and extends into a small part of Henderson County.

For the 2022–23 school year, the district was rated by the Texas Education Agency as follows: 78 (C) overall, 79 (C) for Student Achievement, 80 (B) for School Progress, and 73 (C) for Closing the Gaps.

== Schools ==
- Van High School (Grades 9-12)
- Van Junior High (Grades 6-8)
- Van Middle (Grades 4-6)
- J.E. Rhodes Elementary North & South campuses (Grades PK-3)
