= Todd Fowler =

American football player (born 1962)

No. 46
- Position: Fullback / Tight end

Personal information
- Born: June 9, 1962 (age 64); Van, Texas, U.S.
- Listed height: 6 ft 3 in (1.91 m)
- Listed weight: 222 lb (101 kg)

Career information
- High school: Van
- College: Stephen F. Austin
- Supplemental draft: 1984: 1st round, 25th overall pick

Career history
- Houston Gamblers (1984−1985); Dallas Cowboys (1985−1988)

Awards and highlights
- USFL All-Rookie Team (1984); Second-team All-LSC (1982)

Career NFL statistics
- Games played: 52
- Stats at Pro Football Reference

Todd Fowler (born June 9, 1962) is an American former professional football player who was a tight end in the National Football League (NFL) for the Dallas Cowboys. He also was a member of the Houston Gamblers in the United States Football League (USFL). He played college football for the Stephen F. Austin State Lumberjacks.

== Early life ==
Fowler attended Van High School. He was a two-way football player under his father Mal. As a senior, he helped his team win the Class 3A state championship and received second-team All-state honors at tight end. He also practiced track.

After high school, he moved on to Henderson County Junior College where he was a two-year starter at strong safety and tight end.

He transferred to Stephen F. Austin State University after his sophomore season and became a starter at tight end. In 1982, he registered 26 receptions for 260 yards (third on the team). In his last year, he finished with 22 receptions for 209 yards (third on the team) and one touchdown.

In 2016, he was inducted into the Trinity Valley Community College Hall of Fame. He was named to the All-East Texas All-decade team as a strong safety.

== Professional career ==
=== Houston Gamblers (USFL) ===
Fowler was selected by the Houston Gamblers in the 16th round (332nd overall) of the 1984 USFL draft. He was converted from tight end to fullback during training camp.

As a rookie, Fowler played in all 18 games, starting the last 10 after Sam Harrell was lost for the season with a broken leg. After registering only 17 yards in his first seven games, he finished the season with 1,003 rushing yards (5.9 avg.) and 11 touchdowns. On June 3, Fowler set a league record with 208 rushing yards in a game against the Denver Gold. He also displayed strong blocking skills.

In his second season, sharing the backfield with a healthy Harrell, Fowler registered 402 rushing yards (4.36 avg.) and three touchdowns. In head coach Mouse Davis' run and shoot offense, he became the Gamblers' all-time leading rusher, posting 262 carries for 1,405 yards and 14 touchdowns. He also had 51 receptions for 540 yards and three touchdowns.

=== Dallas Cowboys ===
The Dallas Cowboys selected Fowler in the first round (25th overall) of the 1984 NFL supplemental draft of USFL and CFL players. He signed a contract on September 24, 1984, to start playing in the NFL for the 1985 season, becoming the first USFL player to be signed away from the league.

On August 27, 1985, Fowler was placed on the injured reserve list. He was activated on October 29, before the contest against the St. Louis Cardinals. The Cowboys moved Fowler back to tight end, where he was mainly a backup to Timmy Newsome and Doug Cosbie. In 1988, he started six games while replacing an injured Newsome and finished fifth on the team in special teams tackles. On August 31, 1989, the Cowboys bought out Fowler's contract, in order to avoid placing him on the injured reserve list with a pulled hamstring.
