= Van High School (Texas) =

Location
- 985 N Maple St. Van, Texas 75790-0697; United States; 32.53578°N 95.63867°W

Information
- School type: Public High School
- School district: Van Independent School District
- Principal: Jacob Roach
- Teaching staff: 53.38 (on an FTE basis)
- Grades: 9-12
- Enrollment: 779 (2023–2024)
- Student to teacher ratio: 14.59
- Colors: Red & White
- Athletics conference: UIL Class AAAA
- Team name: Vandals
- Newspaper: The Vandal Voice
- Yearbook: Vandalite
- Website: Van High School

Van High School is a public high school located in Van, Texas, United States. It is part of the Van Independent School District located in east central Van Zandt County and classified as a 4A school by the UIL. With just over 751 students, it is the largest high school in Van Zandt County. In 2022–23, the school was rated by the Texas Education Agency as follows: 83 (B) overall, 81 (B) for Student Achievement, 81 (B) for School Progress, and 87 (B) for Closing the Gaps.

== Academics ==
The fine arts program has won state in a One Act Play -

  - 2002(3A), 2005(3A), 2007(3A), 2011(3A).

=== State Titles ===
- 3A UIL State Championships for Poetry and Prose Interpretation.
- 3A UIL Social Studies Team State Championship in 2010.
- 3A UIL Current Issues and Events State Championships in 2011 and 2012.
- 3A FFA LDE Quiz Team State Championship in 2011.
- 4A TSA Corbin Wood, State Champion in 2015

In the 2015 UIL Academic State meet, of which Van High School competes in annually, the Social Studies team placed second for team. Also, the Computer Science team placed fourth for team.

=== Theater ===
Van's theater department has appeared at the State UIL Theater Competition 12 times since 2002. Van has won the 3A UIL One-Act Play State Championship four times: In 2002 for "Godspell", 2005 for "The Caucasian Chalk Circle", 2007 for "Man of La Mancha", and 2011 for "A Midsummer Night's Dream". Van has also placed second in state three times: in 2008 for "The Elephant Man", in 2014 for "And People All Around", and in 2017 for "The Caucasian Chalk Circle" They have placed third in state 5 times: in 2004 for "Assassins", 2009 for "The Devils", 2010 for "The Caucasian Chalk Circle", 2013 for " Mrs. Packard", and in 2015 for "Don Quixote."

=== Speech and debate ===
The Van Forensics program competes locally as well as statewide and nationally. The program has had top-ten finishers at the NDCA National Tournament, The Tournament of Champions, The TFA State Tournament, and UIL State Tournament as well as having students win TFA State, UIL State, and The NCFL Grand National Tournament. Two students qualified for Nationals in Original Oratory and two qualified for Nationals in Congressional Debate.

== Athletics ==
The Van Vandals compete in these sports - Cross Country, Volleyball, Football, Basketball, Powerlifting, Golf, Tennis, Track, Softball & Baseball, and Marching Band

=== State Champions ===
- Boys Basketball -
  - 1942(1A), 2005(3A)
- Football -
  - 1979(2A)
- 3A UIL State Powerlifting Title - Clayton Kendrick in 2009.
- 3A UIL State Track & Field Pole Vault - Chris Carroll in 1988.

== Notable alumni ==
- Leon Black, former head basketball coach at the University of Texas
- Jermie Calhoun, former college football player for the Oklahoma Sooners and Angelo State Rams.
- Todd Fowler, professional football player for the Dallas Cowboys of the National Football League (NFL)
