= Summer Night Concert Schönbrunn =

Annual outdoor concert in Vienna, Austria

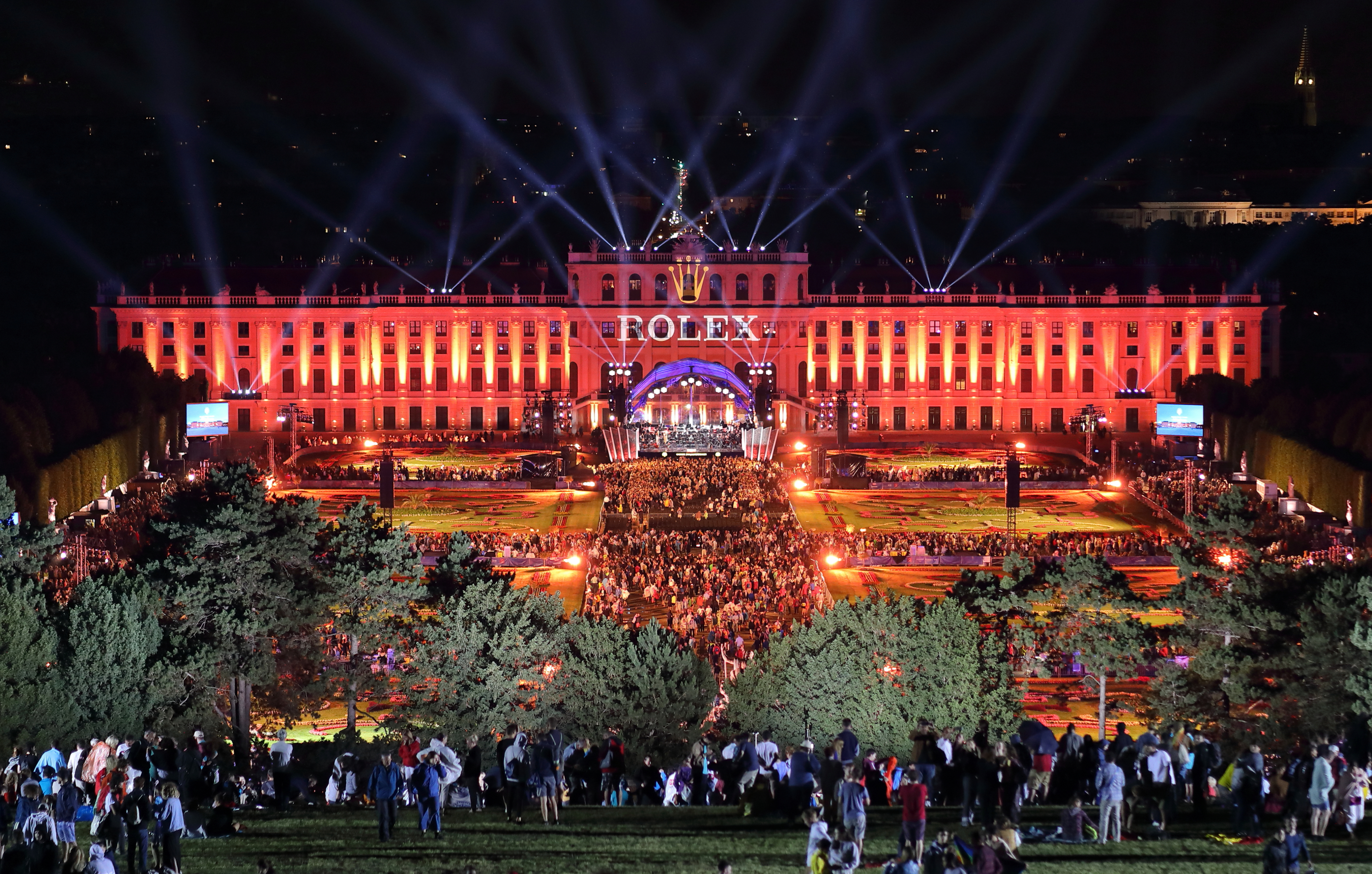
Summer Night Concert Schönbrunn 2019

Summer Night Concert Schönbrunn (German: Sommernachtskonzert) is an annual free entry outdoor concert in Vienna held by the Vienna Philharmonic. The venue for the concert is the Schönbrunn Palace. It has telecast on PBS in the United States as part of the series Great Performances.

== History ==
The concert began operations in 2004. Rolex began sponsoring it in 2009. As of around that year the concert has crowds of over 100,000.

The concert has performed works by Alexander Borodin, Claude Debussy, Manuel de Falla, Franz Liszt, Wolfgang Amadeus Mozart, Modest Mussorgsky, Niccolò Paganini, Amilcare Ponchielli, Jean Sibelius, Johann Strauss II, Richard Strauss, Pyotr Ilyich Tchaikovsky, Giuseppe Verdi, and Richard Wagner. The concert invariably ends with Wiener Blut, by Johann Strauss II.

== Conductors ==
The concert has been conducted by:

- 2026: Lorenzo Viotti
- 2025: Tugan Sokhiev
- 2024: Andris Nelsons
- 2023: Yannick Nézet-Séguin
- 2022: Andris Nelsons
- 2021: Daniel Harding
- 2020: Valery Gergiev
- 2019: Gustavo Dudamel
- 2018: Valery Gergiev
- 2017: Christoph Eschenbach
- 2016: Semyon Bychkov
- 2015: Zubin Mehta
- 2014: Christoph Eschenbach
- 2013: Lorin Maazel
- 2012: Gustavo Dudamel
- 2011: Valery Gergiev
- 2010: Franz Welser-Möst
- 2009: Daniel Barenboim
- 2008: Georges Prêtre
- 2007: Valery Gergiev
- 2006: Plácido Domingo
- 2005: Zubin Mehta
- 2004: Bobby McFerrin
