= AS220 =

Non-profit community arts center

Coordinates: 41.821816°N 71.41595°W

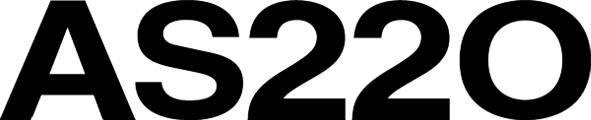
- Type: Nonprofit
- Industry: Arts
- Founded: 1985
- Founder: Umberto Crenca
- Headquarters: Providence, Rhode Island, United States
- Key people: Umberto Crenca, Susan Clausen
- Website: www.as220.org

AS220 is a non-profit community arts center located in Downtown, Providence, Rhode Island, United States. AS220 maintains four dozen artist live/work studios, around a dozen individual work studios, six rotating exhibition spaces, a main stage, a black box theater, a dance studio, a print shop, a community darkroom, a digital media lab, a fabrication lab, an organization-run bar and restaurant, a youth recording studio, and a youth program (AS220 Youth; formerly named the Broad Street Studio). AS220 is an unjuried and uncensored forum for the arts, open to all ages.

== History ==
AS220 was founded in 1985 by Umberto Crenca, alongside Susan Clausen and Scott Seabolt as a space for artists and performers to exhibit their work in an uncensored and unjuried venue. Umberto and a group of artists had been frustrated by conditions in the Rhode Island arts community which made access and success difficult for those outside the Rhode Island School of Design and initiatives backed by local government. In response, they wrote a manifesto and formed AS220 with an emphasis on openness and access.

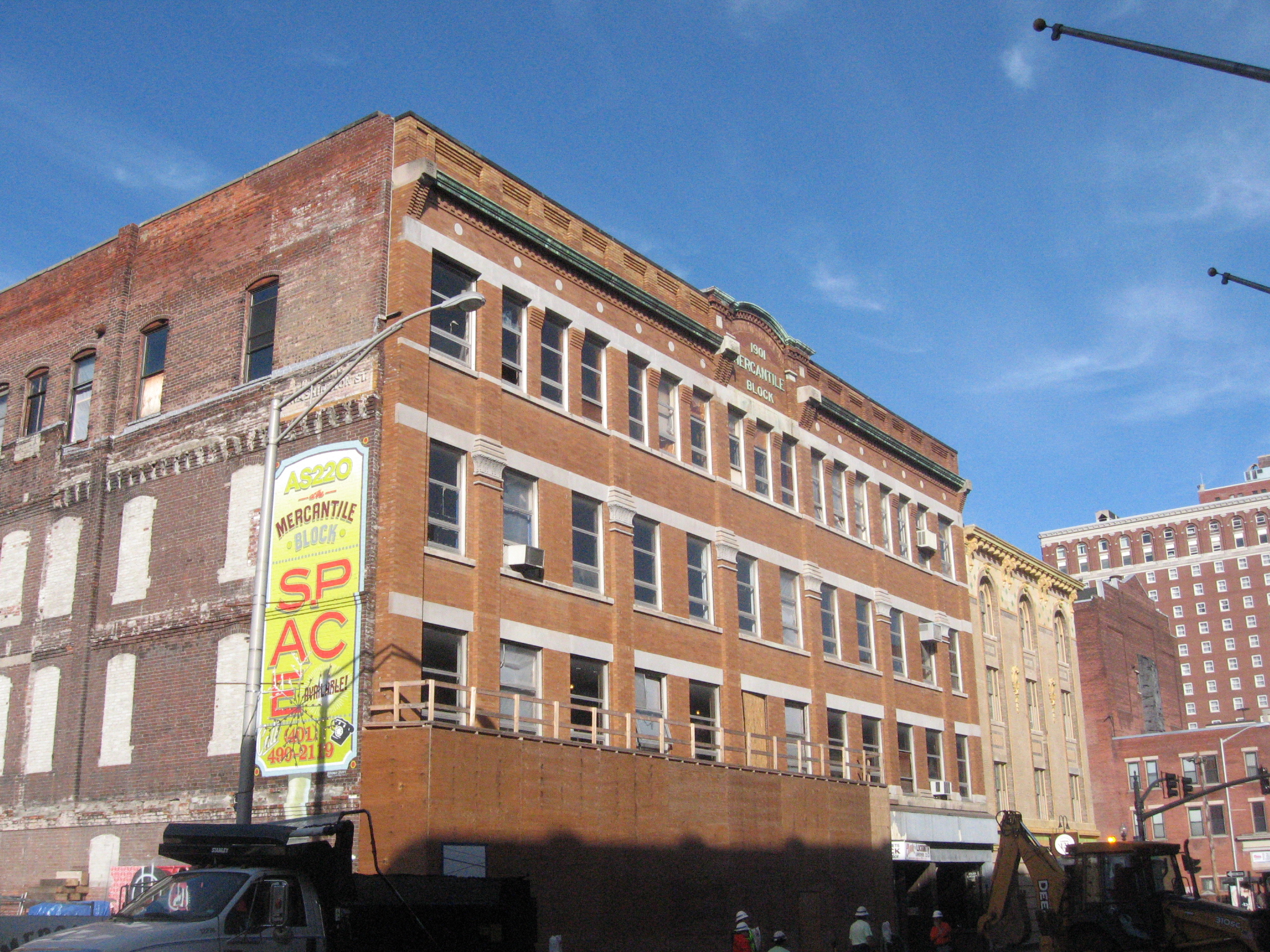
The Mercantile Block building in 2009

AS220 began as an unofficial artists' space at 220 Weybosset Street in downtown Providence, above the Providence Performing Arts Center, incorporating its address into its name. It grew to a collection of seven studios, a gallery, and a performance stage and expanded to Richmond Street.

In 1992, AS220 acquired its own 21,000-square-foot (2,000 m^{2}) building on 95-121 Empire Street, which it renovated in order to create a space for a mixed-use arts center including resident artists, a performance space and gallery, and resident companies like Groundwerx Dance Company and Perishable Theater. The development of the Empire Street facility is credited in part with the creation of an arts and entertainment District in Providence. In 2015, after serving 30 years as artistic director, Crenca transferred his leadership role to Shey Rivera Ríos .

=== Expansion ===
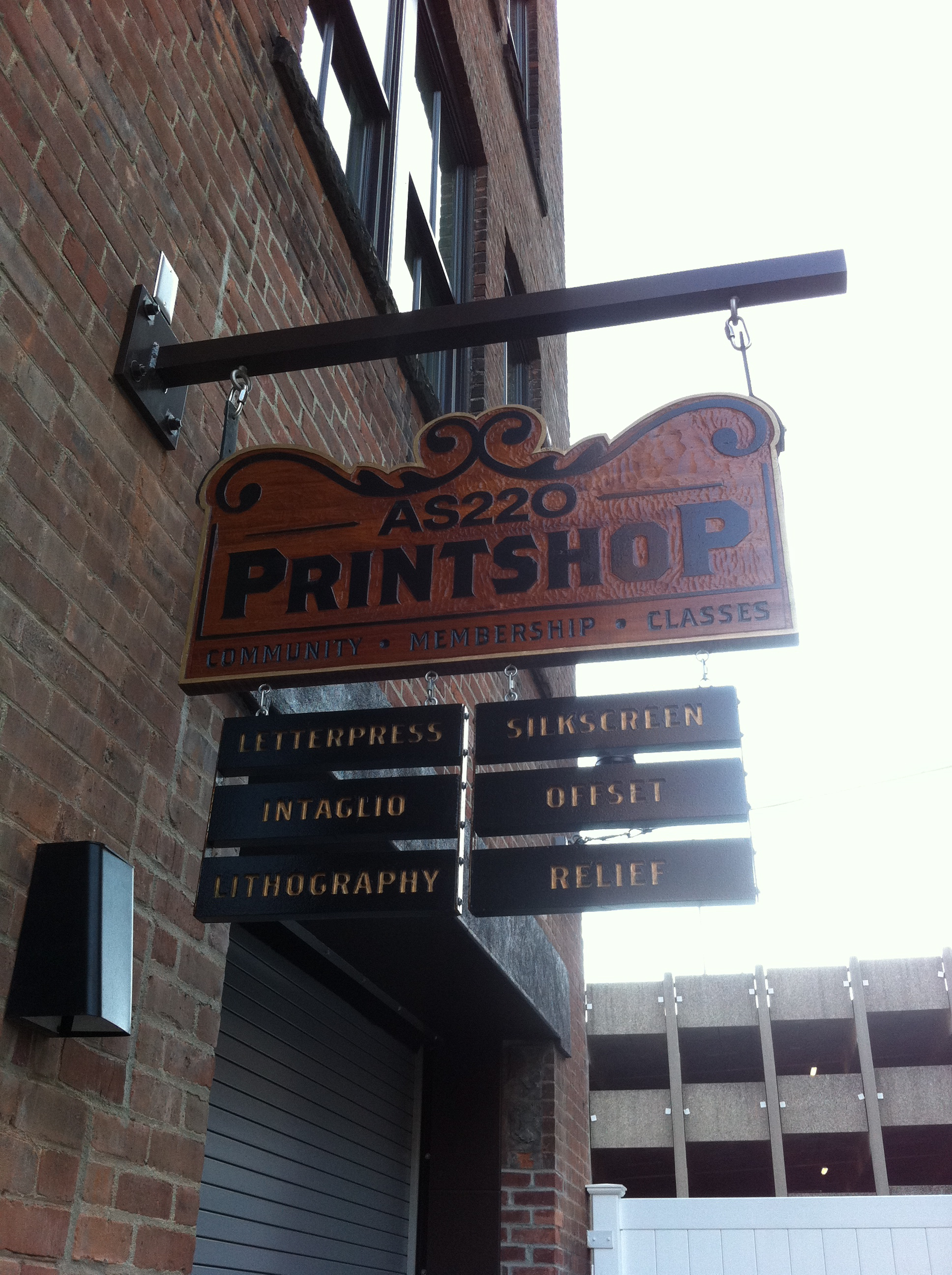
Print shop sign in 2011

In 2000, AS220 established the Broad Street Studio. Between 2003 and 2006, they launched a Capital Campaign which raised $2 million to improve the Empire Street Complex, including the creation of the AS220 Bar and Restaurant.

In 2005, AS220 purchased the Dreyfus Hotel, a 24,000-square-foot (2,200 m^{2}) building on the corner of Washington and Mathewson Streets in downtown Providence. It opened in May 2007 upon the completion of renovations and today is home to fourteen residential studios and four work rental studios, the AS220 administrative offices, and its Project Space art gallery.

In June 2011, AS220 opened its newly renovated Mercantile Block building at 131 Washington Street in Downtown Providence, which it had purchased in 2008. It houses AS220 Industries, comprising the AS220 Community Printshop, AS220 Labs, and AS220 Media Arts. It also includes live and work artist studios, office space for local non-profits, and street-level retail space for local businesses.

AS220 hosts the bi-annual professional development program Practice-Practice for arts administrators around the country and globally.

=== Creative placemaking ===
AS220 is best known as an arts organization, but has also made an impact on the city as a developer, occupying multiple buildings that it either uses for its own purposes or rents to local artists, cultural institutions, and small businesses, often below market rate or categorized as affordable housing for creative contributors. Development for the organization served to expand services but also as a sustainability strategy, securing a place for arts and artists in the city. The National Endowment of the Arts described AS220 as the organization "that anchors the downtown arts and entertainment district" and has played a key role in the city's "creative placemaking", a process defined by the NEA as happening when "partners from public, private, non-profit, and community sectors strategically shape the physical and social character of a neighborhood, town, city, or region around arts and cultural activities."

== Programs and facilities ==
=== Performance spaces ===
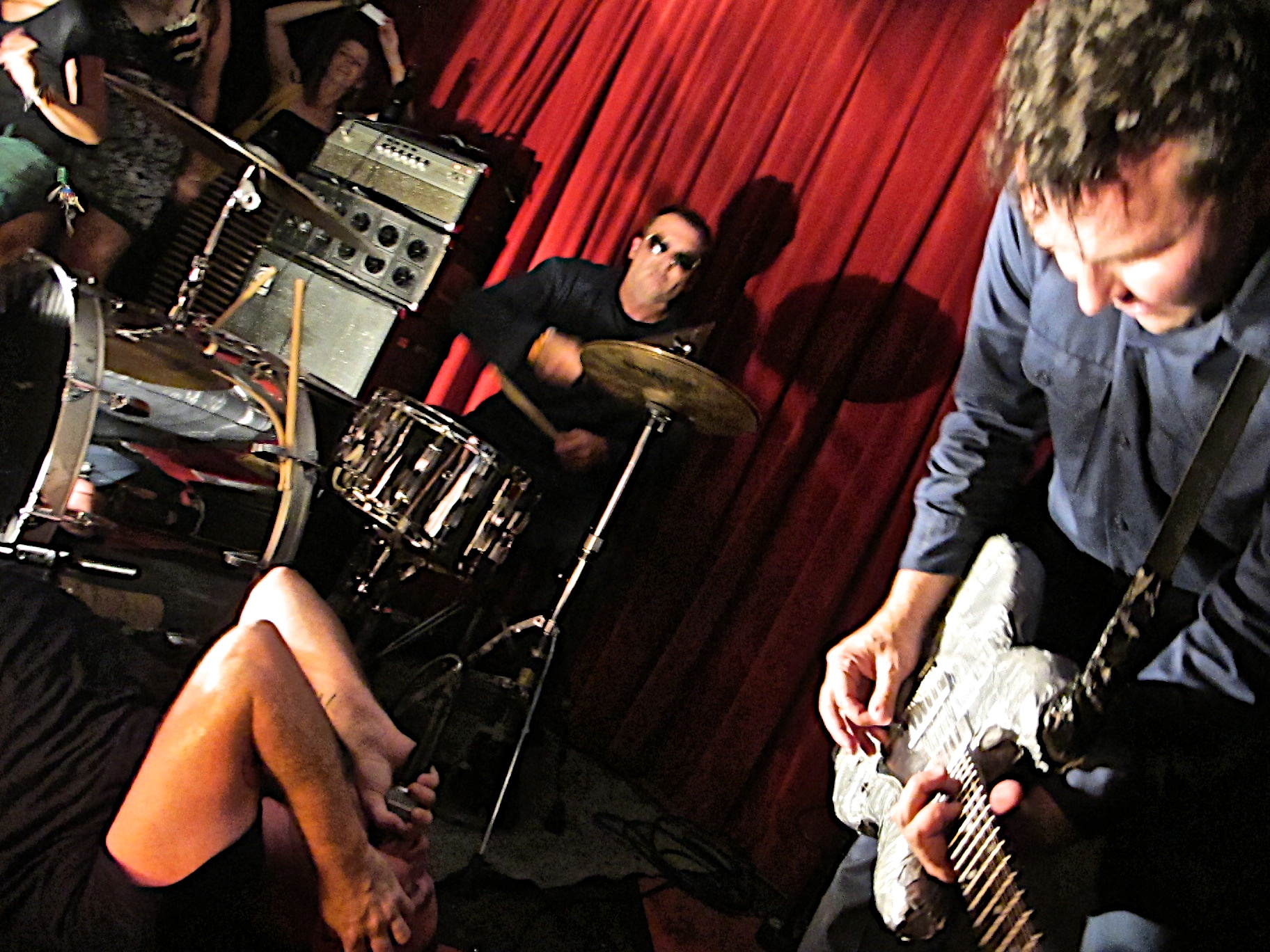
Rhode Island–based noise rock band Arab on Radar performing in 2010

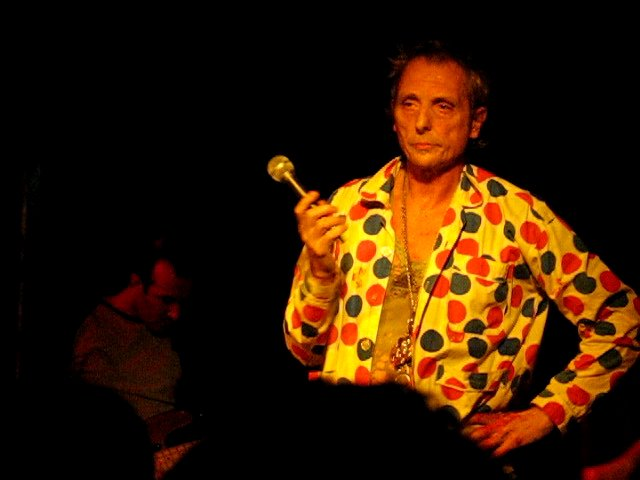
English punk musician Bruno Wizard on stage in 2008

The Main Stage at the Empire Street location showcases 8–12 events each week. It's best known as a music venue, though includes performance art, poetry slams, fashion shows, figure drawing, film screenings, and cultural performances. AS220 was founded on principles of open access, serving as a place for any local artists, creative individuals, and cultural groups. It is unusual in that it has an open booking policy to provide uncensored and unjuried space for artists. Though it frequently hosts acts from other states and countries, it prioritizes Rhode Island–based performers.

AS220 also enforces a "no covers" policy, also implemented in reaction to trends in the area which catered to either national acts or cover bands.

In addition to the main space, the Empire Street location is also home to an experimental black box theater and dance studio.

These spaces originated recurring performances such as the Luna Loba series.

=== Galleries ===
AS220 includes six gallery spaces. The Empire Street Complex houses the Youth Gallery, Open Window, and the Main Gallery, which occupies the same space as the main performance space. The Project Space gallery is located in the Dreyfus building and the Residents' Gallery and THE MOTE are in the Mercantile building.

=== AS220 Youth ===
AS220 Youth (formerly the Broad Street Studio) provides a free arts education to 14–21-year-olds, with a special focus on youth under the care of the state and in the Rhode Island Training School. The youth studio receives support from the AmeriCorps*VISTA program, the public school system, local parents, Providence Health Department, and the Department of Children, Youth, and Families. It hosts multiple free workshops each week in creative writing, dance, music, visual arts, and photography. Annually, it hosts the interdisciplinary hip-hop performance series FutureWorlds.

=== AS220 Industries ===
AS220 has a community printshop, a fabrication lab, and media arts facilities made available to artists, makers, artisans, and learners through classes, training, reserved time, and open access events.

=== Darkroom ===
The Paul Krot Darkroom was established in 1994, along with a number of photography classes and programs which later expanded to include other media arts.

=== Other media ===
In the 1990s, AS220 operated a public access TV show named TV 220.

In 1992, AS220 released an eponymous entitled compilation album, with songs mostly recorded at AS220 in order to raise money for the organization.

In 2019, AS220 began programming a radio station, WFOO-LP, which was assigned 44 percent of the airtime of the low-power FM facility on 101.1 MHz; the other occupants of the frequency are Brown Student and Community Radio's WBRU-LP and Providence Community Radio's WVVX-LP. The stations' transmitter facility, which uses the studio transmitter link tower at the WSBE-TV studios, was constructed in early 2018.

=== Foo Fest ===
Every summer, AS220 hosts an annual block party, "Foo Fest" (previously known as the "Fool's Ball"), a 12-hour event including live music from over 20 local and regional bands and a national headliner, interactive art installations, artist booths, the Rhode Island Mini Maker Fair, and Libertalia's anarchist bookfair. Local arts organizations are invited to participate and perform, with past examples including Girls Rock RI and Providence City Arts.

Notable performers at Foo Fest include Andrew W.K., Warpaint, Sun Ra, Lightning Bolt, Deerhoof, Psychic TV, Dan Deacon, Ssion, and Big Freedia.
