= Edom, Texas =

- City
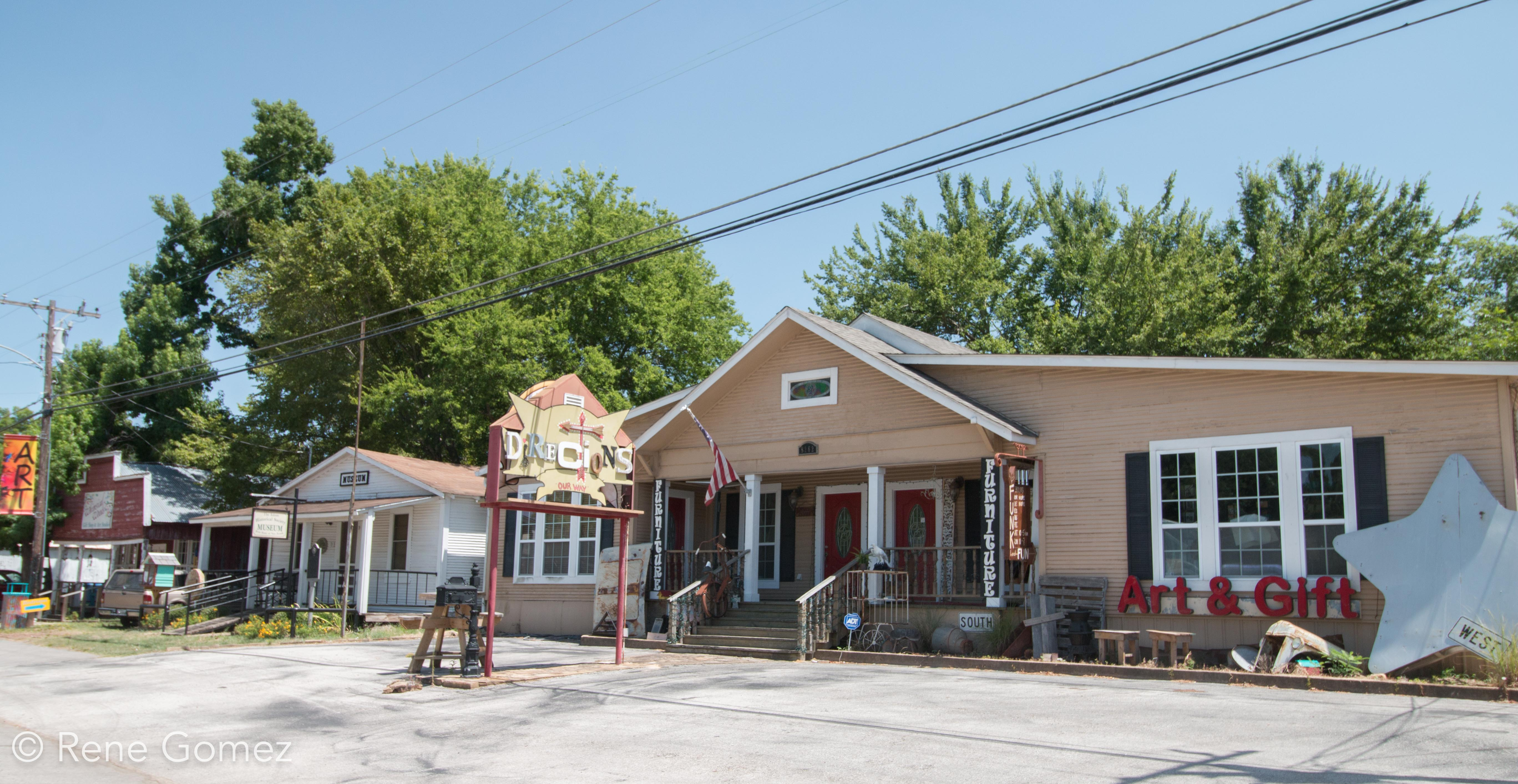
- Street in Edom

- Location of Edom, Texas
- Coordinates: 32°22′39″N 95°36′59″W
- Country: United States
- State: Texas
- County: Van Zandt

Area
  - Total: 2.55 sq mi (6.60 km^{2})
  - Land: 2.51 sq mi (6.50 km^{2})
  - Water: 0.039 sq mi (0.10 km^{2})
- Elevation: 476 ft (145 m)

Population (2020)
  - Total: 339
  - Density: 135/sq mi (52.2/km^{2})
- Time zone: UTC-6 (Central (CST))
  - Summer (DST): UTC-5 (CDT)
- ZIP code: 75754
- Area codes: 430, 903
- FIPS code: 48-22744
- GNIS feature ID: 2410405
- Website: http://www.edomtexas.com/

Edom is a city in Van Zandt County, Texas, United States. The population was 339 at the 2020 census.

== Geography ==
According to the United States Census Bureau, the city has a total area of 4.2 square miles (10.8 km^{2}), of which 4.2 square miles (10.7 km^{2}) is land and 0.04 square mile (0.1 km^{2}) (0.48%) is water.

== Demographics ==
Historical population
Census	Pop.	Note	%±
1970	201		—
1980	250		24.4%
1990	300		20.0%
2000	322		7.3%
2010	375		16.5%
2020	339		−9.6%
U.S. Decennial Census; 2020 Census

=== 2020 census ===
As of the 2020 census, Edom had a population of 339. The median age was 43.3 years. 24.5% of residents were under the age of 18 and 19.2% of residents were 65 years of age or older. For every 100 females there were 101.8 males, and for every 100 females age 18 and over there were 96.9 males age 18 and over.

0.0% of residents lived in urban areas, while 100.0% lived in rural areas.

There were 124 households in Edom, of which 42.7% had children under the age of 18 living in them. Of all households, 65.3% were married-couple households, 10.5% were households with a male householder and no spouse or partner present, and 20.2% were households with a female householder and no spouse or partner present. About 12.1% of all households were made up of individuals and 5.6% had someone living alone who was 65 years of age or older.

There were 136 housing units, of which 8.8% were vacant. The homeowner vacancy rate was 0.0% and the rental vacancy rate was 3.4%.

Racial composition as of the 2020 census
Race	Number	Percent
White	292	86.1%
Black or African American	2	0.6%
American Indian and Alaska Native	1	0.3%
Asian	0	0.0%
Native Hawaiian and Other Pacific Islander	0	0.0%
Some other race	34	10.0%
Two or more races	10	2.9%
Hispanic or Latino (of any race)	51	15.0%

=== 2000 census ===
As of the 2000 census, there were 322 people, 126 households, and 86 families residing in the city. The population density was 77.6 inhabitants per square mile (30.0/km^{2}). There were 141 housing units at an average density of 34.0 per square mile (13.1/km^{2}). The racial makeup of the city was 95.03% White, 0.31% Native American, 3.73% from other races, and 0.93% from two or more races. Hispanic or Latino of any race were 12.42% of the population.

There were 126 households, out of which 29.4% had children under the age of 18 living with them, 58.7% were married couples living together, 8.7% had a female householder with no husband present, and 31.0% were non-families. 25.4% of all households were made up of individuals, and 16.7% had someone living alone who was 65 years of age or older. The average household size was 2.56 and the average family size was 3.14.

In the city, the population was spread out, with 26.4% under the age of 18, 4.7% from 18 to 24, 28.0% from 25 to 44, 23.9% from 45 to 64, and 17.1% who were 65 years of age or older. The median age was 40 years. For every 100 females, there were 87.2 males. For every 100 females age 18 and over, there were 82.3 males.

The median income for a household in the city was $34,375, and the median income for a family was $50,714. Males had a median income of $31,875 versus $23,750 for females. The per capita income for the city was $14,343. About 10.2% of families and 12.7% of the population were below the poverty line, including 16.1% of those under age 18 and 11.9% of those age 65 or over.

== Education ==
The City of Edom is served by the Van Independent School District.
