= Umberto Crenca =

Founder of AS220

Bert Crenca
- Born: Umberto Crenca; 1950
- Education: Rhode Island College
- Spouse: Susan Clausen

Umberto "Bert" Crenca is an American artist, arts administrator, arts advisor and educator. He is known for being a founder and long-time artistic director of the non-profit arts organization, AS220, in Providence, Rhode Island. He has been credited with helping to "lay the groundwork for much of the cultural development that shaped the Providence imaginary in the 1990s and early decades of the 21st century" by scholar Micah Salkind, and in 2010 was identified as one of Rhode Island's Most Influential People by Rhode Island Monthly.

== Early life ==
Crenca was born in Rhode Island in 1950. In the 1980s, Crenca worked in the print shop of Fleet Bank. He graduated from the Rhode Island College in 1981 with a bachelor's degree in fine arts.

== AS220 ==
Following an unfavorable review of Crenca's work in The Providence Journal in 1982, a group of artists gathered to condemn harsh art critiques. Together, they created a manifesto and sought to create a new art space. This resulted in Crenca founding AS220, a non-profit art space, in 1985. AS220 grew from a small performance and studio space in 1985 to the proprietor of live/work studios, exhibition spaces, multiple performance areas, teaching spaces, a restaurant and bar. Crenca describes his work at AS220 as being "extremely blurred" with his work as an artist, and describes AS220 as a "work of art."

Crenca retired as artistic director of AS220 in 2015, and served as an adjunct advisor and spokesperson for the organization through 2019.

== Arts administration and education ==
In his capacity as artistic director of AS220 and arts administrator, Crenca acted on local boards and committees as a representative of the Rhode Island arts community, including the Arts and Entertainment District Task Force in 1992, the mayoral transition committees of Providence mayors David Cicilline (2002) and Jorge Elorza (2014), and the Providence School Board 2005–2008.

Crenca has spoken at numerous events as regarding place-making and community arts programs, including the keynote address Museums Aotearoa Conference in New Zealand in 2012, the TEDxProvidence conference in 2013, and The Cass Project's lecture series at the University at Buffalo in 2018.

Much of his work has centered around arts education and programming for youth, including the establishment of the Broad Street Studio, which evolved over time into what is now the AS220 Youth Program, and his work as an art instructor at the Rhode Island Training School and at AS220's education program for arts administrators, Practice//Practice.

== Visual art, music and performance ==
Crenca is a visual artist, musician and performer. His style was described as "propelled by a prolific, relentless, try-everything-at-once drive" and "improvisational, free-association, automatic-writing, hallucinatory" by Greg Cook of the Providence Phoenix.

In the 1990s, Crenca co-led a Fluxus-based music and performance troupe, Meatballs/Fluxus. His other musical and performance collaborations include Monkee Head, Panic Band, and the Gillen Street Ensemble.

Crenca is featured in the 2024 documentary Secret Mall Apartment.

In 2025, Crenca and the Gillen Street Ensemble premiered their musical From Here to Where at Wilbury Theatre Group in Providence in September 2025.

=== Selected exhibitions ===
- 1984 - Galleria del Corso, Latino, Italy
- 1985 - Antonio Dattorro Studio Gallery
- 2004 - Frenetic Engineering: censored/uncensored, Newport Art Museum and Blink Gallery, Newport, RI
- 2010 - You Can't Call Your Own Baby Ugly, AS220 Project Space, Providence, Rhode Island
- 2007 - Just 'N Artist/Not an Artist at Firehouse 13 Gallery
- 2014 - Puzzled, Machines with Magnets
- 2017 - Pain and Such, Providence, RI, 82 Weybossett Street)

== Awards and honors ==
- 1997 - Crenca was fellow in the Pew Civic Entrepreneur Initiative
- 2005 - Pew Civic Entrepreneur Initiative Fellow
- 2010 - Rhode Island Pell Award for Excellence in the Arts
- 2010 - Rhode Island College Charles B Willard Professional Achievement Award
- 2011 - Rhode Island Foundation Community Service Award
- 2013 - Rhode Island Arts and Culture and Tourism Making a Difference Award
- 2016 - Honorary doctorate from Brown University
- 2016 - Honorary doctorate from Roger Williams University
- 2016 - Honored by the White House as one of the Champions of Change national initiative.
- 2002 RI Foundation Fellow
- 2003 Scholarship Recipient, Harvard University Business School
