= Van, Texas =

- City
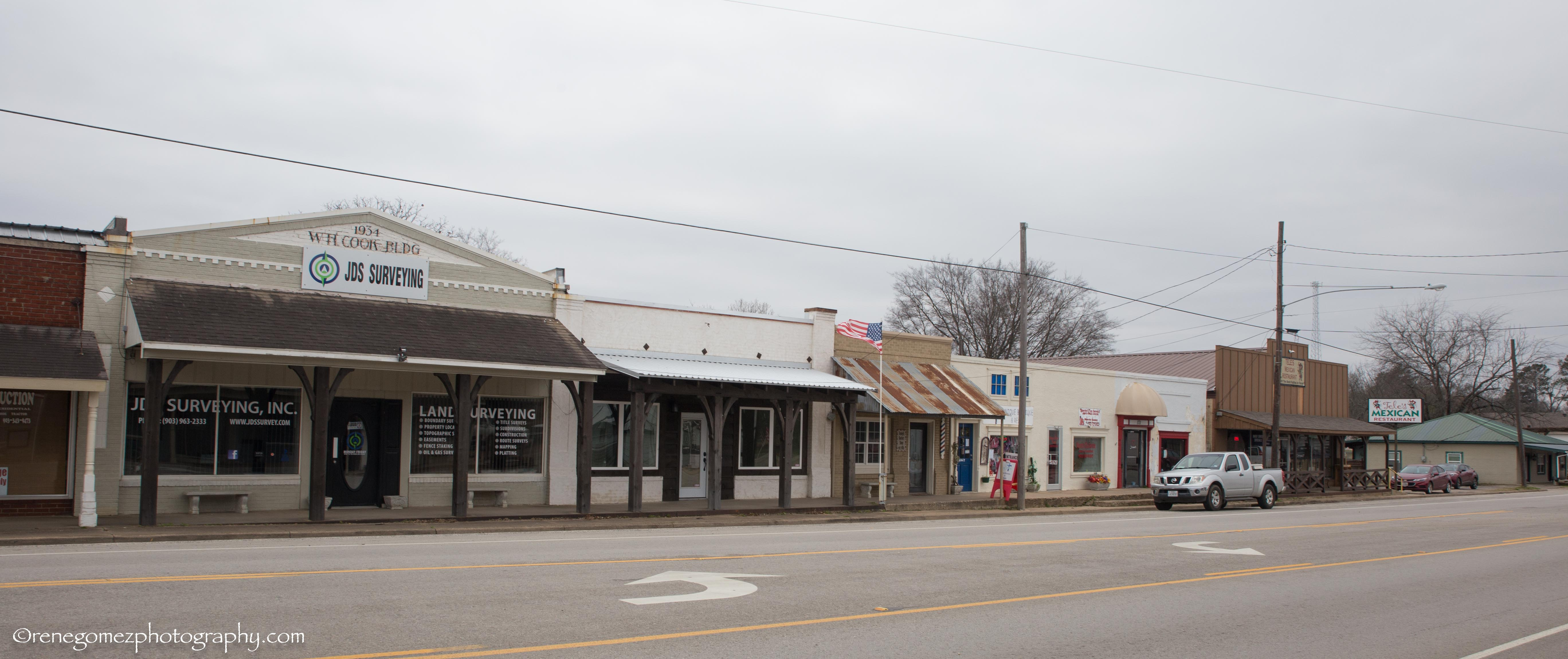
- Downtown Van, Texas

- Location within Van Zandt County and Texas
- Coordinates: 32°31′32″N 95°37′45″W
- Country: United States
- State: Texas
- County: Van Zandt

Area
  - Total: 2.99 sq mi (7.75 km^{2})
  - Land: 2.99 sq mi (7.75 km^{2})
  - Water: 0 sq mi (0.00 km^{2})
- Elevation: 486 ft (148 m)

Population (2020)
  - Total: 2,664
  - Density: 890/sq mi (344/km^{2})
- Time zone: UTC-6 (Central (CST))
  - Summer (DST): UTC-5 (CDT)
- ZIP code: 75790
- Area codes: 430, 903
- FIPS code: 48-74912
- GNIS feature ID: 2412144
- Website: www.vantexas.org

Van is a city located in southeastern Van Zandt County, Texas, United States, about 26 miles northwest of Tyler. Its population was 2,664 at the 2020 census. The town draws its name from an early settler and school teacher, Henry Vance.

== History ==
Van's first settlers in the area had arrived by the time of the Civil War. By 1874, the town was named Swindler for George Swindler, who donated land for a school west of the present business district and land north of that site in 1891 to the Methodist Church. In 1894, schoolteacher Henry Vance, the town's namesake, established a post office, and the name Van was chosen when the post office renamed the community.

A Pure Oil company survey near the town in 1927 on the land of W.T. Jarman eventually led to the discovery of oil by P.B. Garland on October 13, 1929. The Jarman no. 1 discovery well flowed 147 barrels of oil from the Woodbine Formation at a depth of 2,710 feet (830 m). Sun Oil, Shell Petroleum, the Texas Company, Pure Oil, and Humble became co-owners of the field, with Pure Oil as chief operator. By 1994, the Van Field had produced 502 million barrels of oil.

Van experienced an overnight oil boom, growing from a rural farming community with a school and post office, to an oil boomtown where 30 buildings, including hotels and stores, had been constructed in only 10 days. In 1930, the Texas Short Line Railway was extended from Grand Saline. The population numbered 894 throughout the 1930s. The population declined to 620 during World War II, as workers moved away to jobs in war-related industry, but increased steadily thereafter. Businesses in the community fluctuated from a high of 50 in 1934 to a low of 15 in 1945, but remained between 30 and 40 throughout most of the town's history. Mechanization of the oilfield occurred in the 1940s, and by the 1950s, Van had a Humble Oil refinery, five churches, and a consolidated independent school district. A total of 591 wells made up the Van field when Pure Oil became a division of Union Oil in 1965. The population of Van grew from 1,103 in 1962 to 1,820 by 1974. The population reached just over 2,600 residents in 2013.

=== May 2015 tornado ===
On May 10, 2015, shortly after sunset, Van was struck by a strong tornado during the May 5–10, 2015 tornado outbreak sequence. According to the National Weather Service and tornado chasers, a severe thunderstorm spawned a tornado that touched down in a heavily wooded thicket just south of Van Zandt County Road 4609, just west of the small community of Primrose, 10 miles south of Van. The tornado path moved in a direct line north, crossing Texas State Highway 64, picking up strength as it crossed the Neches River, and then Interstate 20 just south of the town. The tornado went straight into the heart of Van, causing heavy damage to structures in the town. It destroyed the elementary school in the city that was a historical monument and then moved due north through residential neighborhoods, destroying homes and causing massive structural damage. The tornado continued in a straight line north towards Grand Saline and dissipated 3.5 miles north of Van. Numerous homes and mobile homes were damaged or destroyed, and many trees and power lines were downed throughout Van. A nearby metal-frame industrial building was destroyed. A few well-built frame homes in the northern part of town were left with only interior walls standing. An oil pump derrick toppled to the ground, along with a large, metal, high-tension truss tower. Several barns and outbuildings were destroyed, as well. Two people were killed and 47 were injured, prompting local emergency management officials to declare a mass-casualty incident. The following day, the tornado was given a rating of EF3 from the National Weather Service office in Fort Worth.

== Geography ==
According to the United States Census Bureau, the city has a total area of 3.0 sq mi (7.7 km^{2}), all land.

== Transportation ==
Van is served by:

- Interstate 20 is south of downtown Van.
- State Highway 110 is designated as Maple Street in the city; it runs southeast toward Tyler and north to Grand Saline.
- Farm to Market Road 16 is designated as Main Street in the city limits; the road runs west to near Canton and east toward Lindale.
- Farm to Market Road 314 is marked as Oak Street; Van is the northern terminus of this road that runs south toward Brownsboro, just west of Tyler.
- Farm to Market Road 1805 runs from Van and connects to FM 1253 into nearby Smith County.

== Demographics ==
Historical population
| Census | Pop. | Note | %± |
|---|---|---|---|
| 1950 | 610 | | — |
| 1960 | 1,103 | | 80.8% |
| 1970 | 1,593 | | 44.4% |
| 1980 | 1,881 | | 18.1% |
| 1990 | 1,854 | | −1.4% |
| 2000 | 2,362 | | 27.4% |
| 2010 | 2,632 | | 11.4% |
| 2020 | 2,664 | | 1.2% |
U.S. Decennial Census

=== 2020 census ===
As of the 2020 census, there were 2,664 people, 958 households, and 710 families residing in the city. The median age was 38.2 years. 27.0% of residents were under the age of 18 and 17.5% of residents were 65 years of age or older. For every 100 females there were 89.3 males, and for every 100 females age 18 and over there were 81.2 males age 18 and over.

None of the residents lived in urban areas, while 100.0% lived in rural areas.

Of the 958 households, 37.9% had children under 18 living in them, 50.7% were married-couple households, 14.2% were households with a male householder and no spouse or partner present, and 29.7% were households with a female householder and no spouse or partner present. About 24.6% of all households were made up of individuals, and 12.8% had someone living alone who was 65 or older.

The city had 1,061 housing units, of which 9.7% were vacant. The homeowner vacancy rate was 2.9% and the rental vacancy rate was 7.5%.

Racial composition as of the 2020 census
| Race | Number | Percentage |
|---|---|---|
| White | 2,214 | 83.1% |
| Black or African American | 55 | 2.1% |
| American Indian and Alaska Native | 11 | 0.4% |
| Asian | 21 | 0.8% |
| Native Hawaiian and other Pacific Islander | 0 | 0.0% |
| Some other race | 151 | 5.7% |
| Two or more races | 212 | 8.0% |
| Hispanic or Latino (of any race) | 375 | 14.1% |

== Education ==
Van is served by the Van Independent School District and home to the Van High School Vandals. It is also in the Tyler Junior College taxing district, as many residents attend the school.

== Notable people ==
- Dan Flynn, a businessman and rancher from Van, was a former Republican member of the Texas House of Representatives
- Todd Fowler, a former professional football player
- Adrian Hall, a theatre director

== Gallery ==
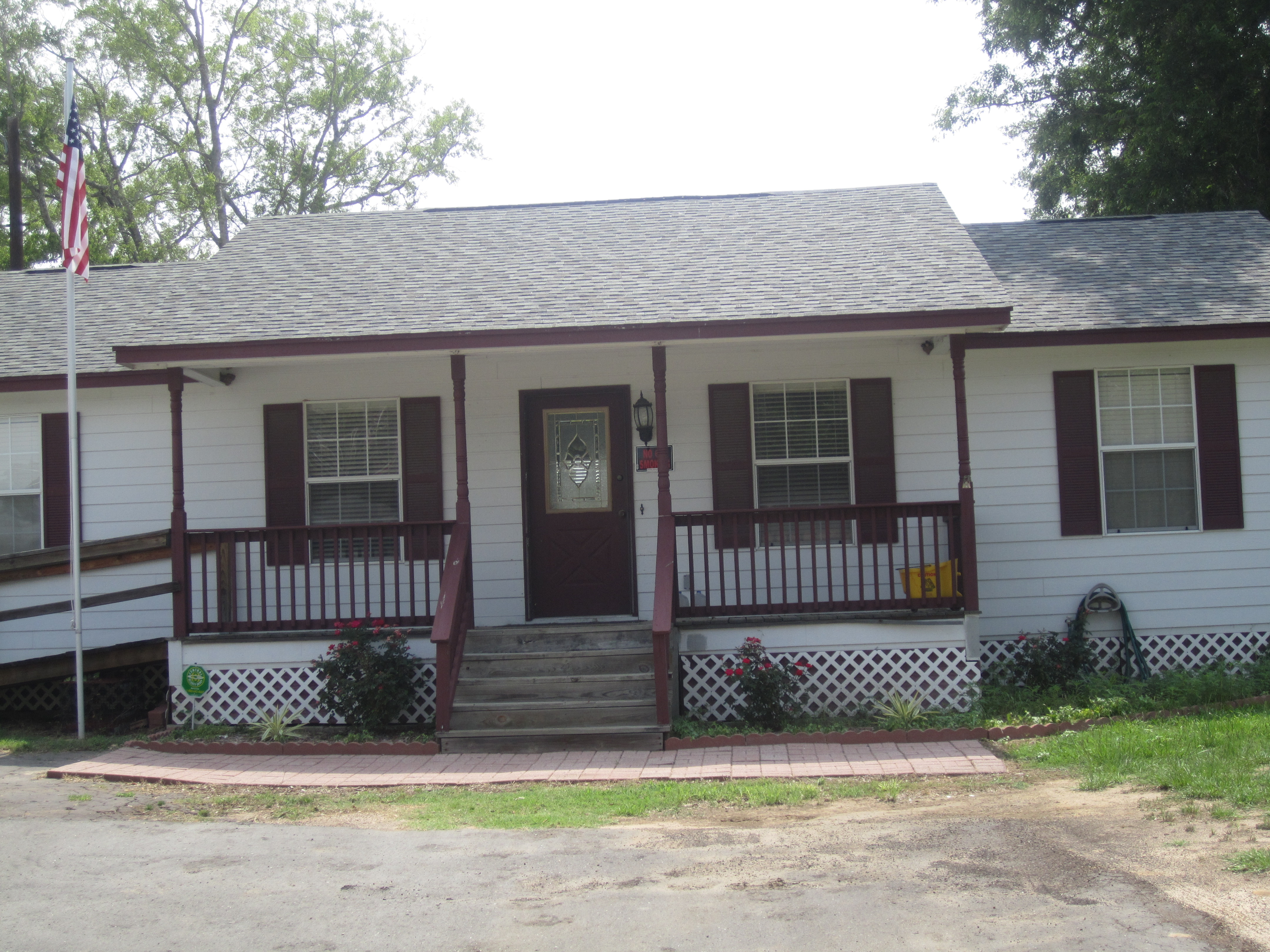
The City Hall in Van resembles a residence.

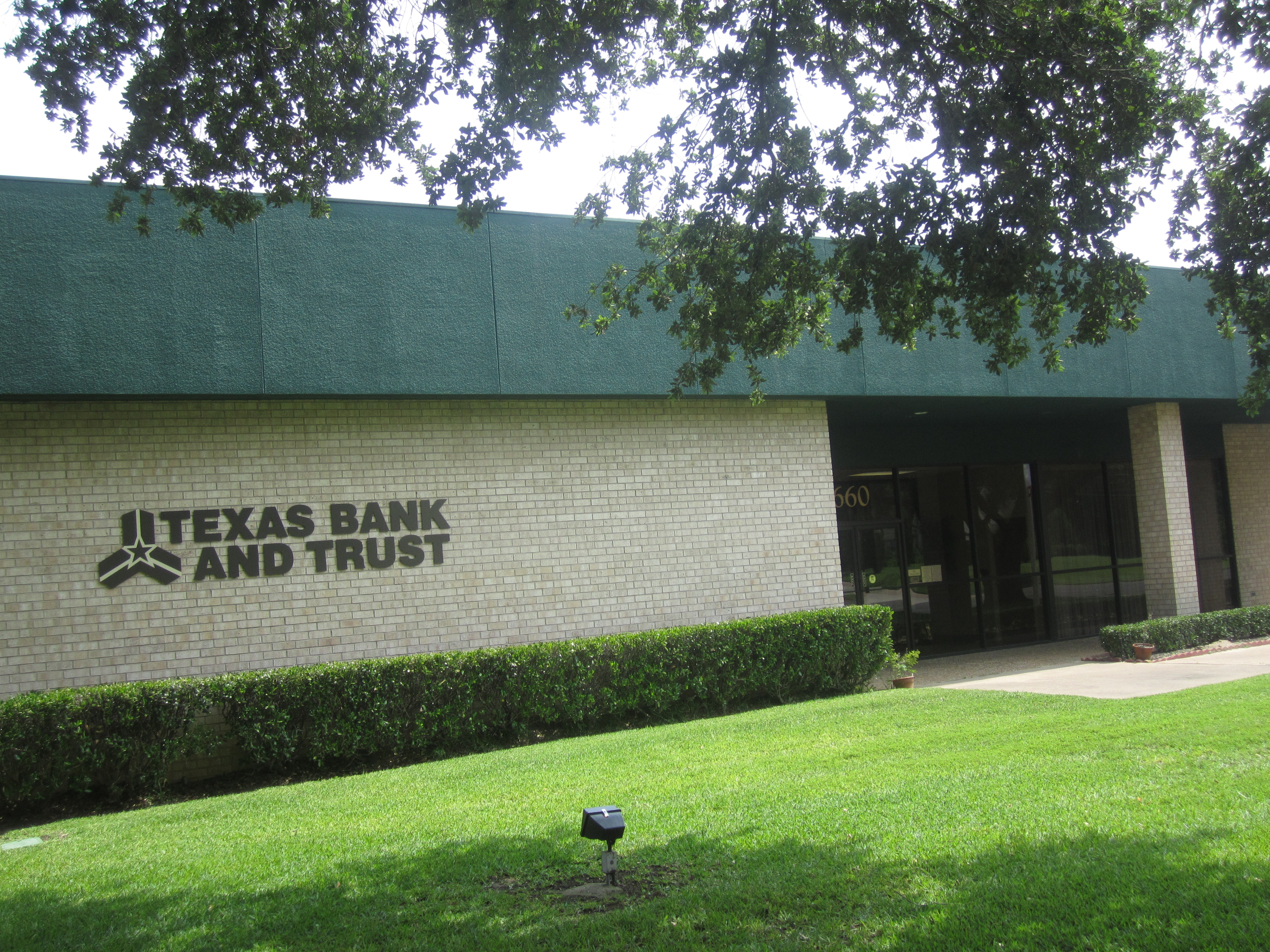
Texas Bank and Trust Co.

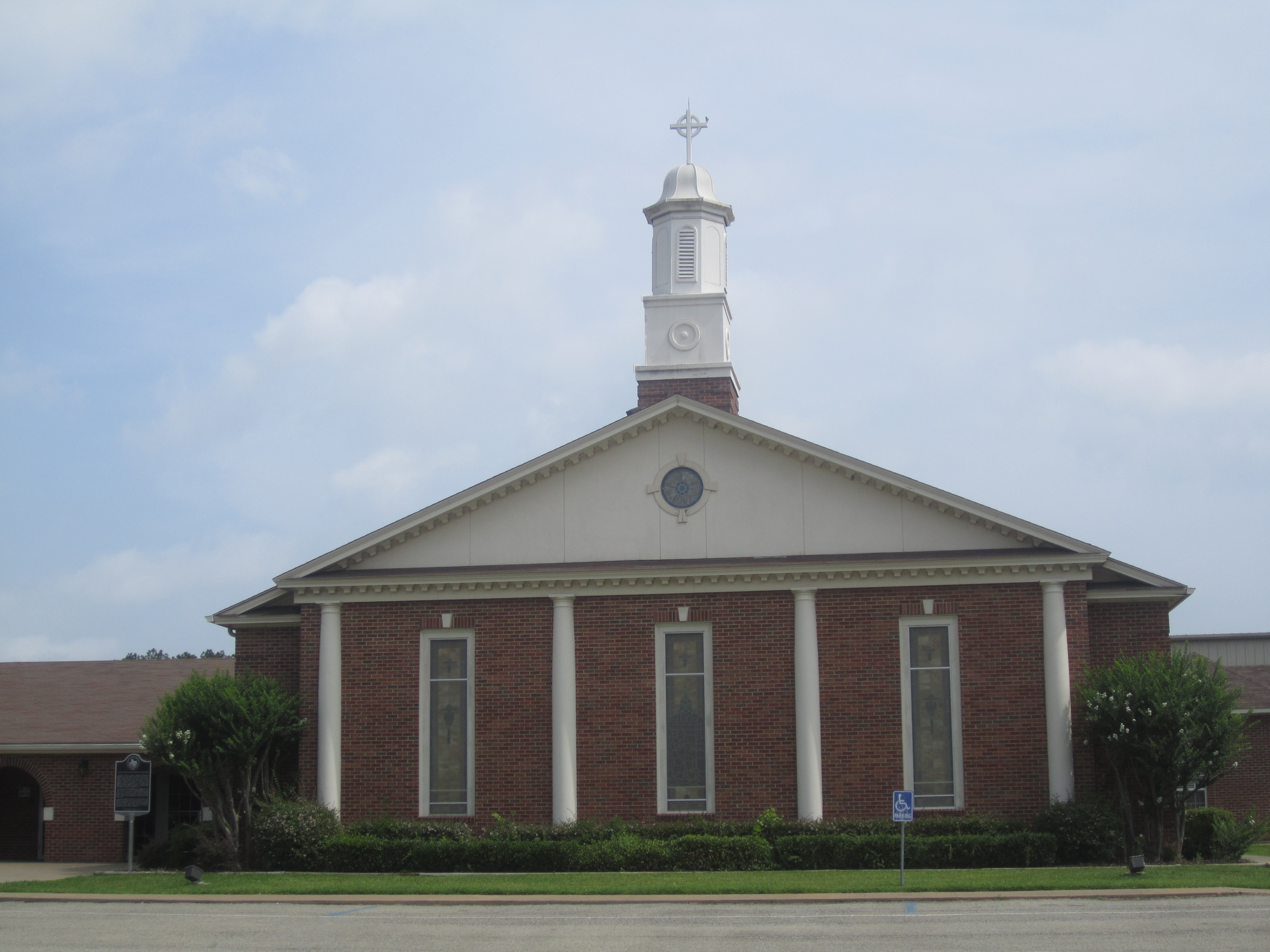
First United Methodist Church (2012)
