= Adrian Hall (director) =

American theater director (1927–2023)

- Born: December 3, 1927; Van, Texas, U.S.
- Died: February 4, 2023 (aged 95); Tyler, Texas, U.S.
- Education: East Texas State Teachers College
- Occupations: Actor, director, artistic director
- Known for: Work in regional theatre

Adrian Hall (December 3, 1927 – February 4, 2023) was an American theater director. His directing style was described as "bold" by the New York Times, and his work was considered part of the first and second generation of the regional theater movement of the 1960s and late 1980s. He was the founding Artistic Director of the Trinity Repertory Company in Providence, Rhode Island from 1963 to 1986, and the Artistic Director of Dallas Theater Center in Dallas, Texas from 1983 to 1989. He is considered to have created major and divisive change within both institutions.

== Trinity Repertory Company ==
In addition to his work producing plays at Trinity Repertory, Hall oversaw and participated in the Project Discovery program at Trinity Repertory, which introduced high school students to theater. Actress Viola Davis credits Hall's visit to her high school and the subsequent visits to the theater during Hall's tenure as what "changed her path."

Two of Hall's productions at Trinity Repertory Company were featured on the PBS series, Great Performances.

== Personal life and death ==
Hall was born in Van, Texas, in 1927, and took an interest in theatre from an early age. After graduating high school early, he enrolled at East Texas State Teachers College (now Texas A&M University–Commerce) when he was sixteen, and graduated in 1949. He also spent six months during that time studying at the Pasadena Playhouse. After serving in the U.S. Army, he worked in New York for several years before beginning at Trinity.

Hall was a resident of Van at the time of his death. He died at a hospital in nearby Tyler, Texas, on February 4, 2023, at the age of 95.
