= National Register of Historic Places listings in Van Zandt County, Texas =

Location of Van Zandt County in Texas

This is a list of the National Register of Historic Places listings in Van Zandt County, Texas.

This is intended to be a complete list of properties listed on the National Register of Historic Places in Van Zandt County, Texas. There are two properties listed on the National Register in the county. Both properties are also Recorded Texas Historic Landmarks.

This National Park Service list is complete through NPS recent listings posted March 21, 2025.

== Current listings ==
The locations of National Register properties may be seen in a mapping service provided.

	Name on the Register	Image	Date listed	Location	City or town	Description
1	William H. and Molly P. Humphries House	William H. and Molly P. Humphries House	August 20, 2004 (#04000890)	201 S. Main St. 32°41′47″N 95°53′11″W	Edgewood	Recorded Texas Historic Landmark
2	Van Zandt County Courthouse	Van Zandt County Courthouse	February 28, 2017 (#100000698)	121 E. Dallas St. 32°33′22″N 95°51′47″W	Canton	Recorded Texas Historic Landmark

== See also ==
- National Register of Historic Places listings in Texas
- Recorded Texas Historic Landmarks in Van Zandt County
