= Wentworth, Texas =

- Unincorporated community
- Location within Texas Location within the United States
- Coordinates: 32°34′23″N 95°48′21″W
- Country: United States
- State: Texas
- County: Van Zandt
- Elevation: 489 ft (149 m)
- Time zone: UTC-6 (Central (CST))
  - Summer (DST): UTC-5 (CDT)
- Area codes: 903 & 430
- GNIS feature ID: 1379252

Wentworth is an unincorporated community in Van Zandt County, Texas, United States. According to the Handbook of Texas, the community had a population of 32 in 2000. It is located within the Dallas/Fort Worth Metroplex.

== Geography ==
Wentworth is located at the intersection of Farm to Market Roads 1255 and Interstate 20, 2 mi (3.2 km) northeast of Canton in central Van Zandt County.

== Education ==
Since 1949, the community has been served by the Canton Independent School District.
