= Oakland, Van Zandt County, Texas =

- Unincorporated community
- Location within Texas Location within the United States
- Coordinates: 32°34′16″N 95°45′20″W
- Country: United States
- State: Texas
- County: Van Zandt
- Elevation: 489 ft (149 m)
- Time zone: UTC-6 (Central (CST))
  - Summer (DST): UTC-5 (CDT)
- Area codes: 903 & 430
- GNIS feature ID: 1378782

Oakland is an unincorporated community in Van Zandt County, Texas, United States. According to the Handbook of Texas, the community had a population of 26 in 2000. It is located within the Dallas/Fort Worth Metroplex.

== History ==
Oakland had two churches, one business, and 20 residents in 1939. That business, a cemetery, and several scattered houses were in the community in 1965. The population was recorded as 26 from 1974 through 2000.

== Geography ==
Oakland is located at the intersection of Farm to Market Roads 1255 and 1652, 7 mi (11 km) east of Canton in east-central Van Zandt County.

== Education ==
Oakland had its own school in 1890. It had 21 students enrolled in 1906. Today, the community is served by the Grand Saline Independent School District.
