= Canton High School (Texas) =

Public school in Texas, United States

Location
- 1110 W Hwy 243; Canton, Texas 75103-2031; United States; 32.5449°N 95.8875°W

Information
- School type: Public high school
- School district: Canton Independent School District
- Principal: Lisa Parker
- Teaching staff: 54.51 (FTE)
- Grades: 9-12
- Enrollment: 681 (2023–2024)
- Student to teacher ratio: 12.49
- Colors: Green & White
- Athletics conference: UIL Class AAAA
- Mascot: Eagles/Eaglettes
- Website: hs.cantonisd.net

Canton High School is a public high school located in Canton, Texas (USA). It is part of the Canton Independent School District located in central Van Zandt County and classified as a 4A school by the UIL. In 2022–23, the school was rated by the Texas Education Agency as follows: 89 (B) overall, 90 (A) for Student Achievement, 88 (B) for School Progress, and 87 (B) for Closing the Gaps. It also was designated with distinction in Academic Achievement in Reading/Language Arts and Academic Achievement in Science.

== Athletics ==
The Canton Eagles compete in the following sports -

Cross Country, Volleyball, Football, Basketball, Powerlifting, Golf, Tennis, Track, Softball, and Baseball.

=== State titles ===
- Boys Cross Country -
  - 1998(3A), 2000(3A)
- Girls Golf -
  - 1986(3A), 1988(3A)
- Girls Powerlifting -
  - 2010(3A), 2011(3A), 2012(3A)

== Rivals ==
- Brownsboro Bears
- Mabank Panthers
- Van Vandals
- Wills Point Tigers

== Academics ==
- UIL Spelling Champions -
  - 2007(3A)

== Band ==
- Marching Band State Champions
  - 2002(3A), 2004(3A), 2006(3A), 2018(4A)

== Notable alumni ==
- Colten Brewer, professional baseball player
- G. J. Kinne, professional football coach and former player
- Keavon Milton, former professional football player
- Ace Reese, professional baseball player in the Seattle Mariners organization.
