= Midway, Van Zandt County, Texas =

- Unincorporated community
- Location within Texas Location within the United States
- Coordinates: 32°23′40″N 95°33′35″W
- Country: United States
- State: Texas
- County: Van Zandt
- Elevation: 577 ft (176 m)
- Time zone: UTC-6 (Central (CST))
  - Summer (DST): UTC-5 (CDT)
- Area codes: 903 & 430
- GNIS feature ID: 2034663

Midway is an unincorporated community in Van Zandt County, Texas, United States. According to the Handbook of Texas, the community had a population of 31 in 2000. It is located within the Dallas/Fort Worth Metroplex.

== History ==
A 1936 county highway map showed a church and several scattered houses in Midway. It had three businesses in 1987. Its population was recorded as 31 in 1990 and 2000.

== Geography ==
Midway is located on Texas State Highway 64, 21 mi (34 km) southeast of Canton in southeastern Van Zandt County.

== Education ==
Today, Midway is served by the Canton Independent School District.
