= Walton, Texas =

- Unincorporated community
- Location within Texas Location within the United States
- Coordinates: 32°21′38″N 95°50′55″W
- Country: United States
- State: Texas
- County: Van Zandt
- Elevation: 509 ft (155 m)
- Time zone: UTC-6 (Central (CST))
  - Summer (DST): UTC-5 (CDT)
- Area codes: 430, 903
- GNIS feature ID: 2034620

Walton is an unincorporated community in Van Zandt County, Texas, United States. According to the Handbook of Texas, the community had a population of 35 in 2000. It is situated within the Dallas/Fort Worth Metroplex.

== Geography ==
Walton is located at the intersection of Farm to Market Road 1861 and Texas State Highway 19, 13 mi (21 km) south of Canton in extreme south-central Van Zandt County.

== Education ==
Walton had its own school in 1890 and had 18 students recorded in 1905. The school continued to operate in 1936. Today, Walton is served by the Athens Independent School District.
