= Silver Lake, Texas =

- Unincorporated community
- Location within Texas Location within the United States
- Coordinates: 32°40′11″N 95°35′45″W
- Country: United States
- State: Texas
- County: Van Zandt
- Elevation: 390 ft (120 m)
- Time zone: UTC-6 (Central (CST))
  - Summer (DST): UTC-5 (CDT)
- Area codes: 903 & 430
- GNIS feature ID: 1379078

Silver Lake is an unincorporated community in Van Zandt County, Texas, United States. According to the Handbook of Texas, the community had a population of 42 in 2000. It is located within the Dallas/Fort Worth Metroplex.

== Education ==
In 1952 Silver Lake joined the Grand Saline Independent School District.
