= First Monday (disambiguation) =

First Monday is a 2002 American TV series.

First Monday may also refer to:

- First Monday (journal), an online scientific journal for articles about the Internet
- First Monday Trade Days, a flea market in Canton, Texas

== See also ==
- First Monday in October, a 1978 play by Jerome Lawrence and Robert E. Lee
  - First Monday in October (film), a 1981 American film based on the play
- The First Monday in May, 2016 documentary film by Andrew Rossi
