= Wise, Texas =

- Unincorporated community
- Location within Texas Location within the United States
- Coordinates: 32°30′48″N 96°2′7″W
- Country: United States
- State: Texas
- County: Van Zandt
- Elevation: 430 ft (130 m)
- Time zone: UTC-6 (Central (CST))
  - Summer (DST): UTC-5 (CDT)
- Area codes: 903 & 430
- GNIS feature ID: 1379289

Wise is an unincorporated community in Van Zandt County, Texas, United States. According to the Handbook of Texas, the community had a population of 29 in 2000. It is located within the Dallas/Fort Worth Metroplex.

== History ==
Wise was first settled by a Norwegians in 1848 as Fourmile Prairie. In 1889, it was renamed to Wise. Its population was 29 in 1990 and 2000.

== Geography ==
Wise is located at the intersection of Farm to Market Roads 47 and 3227, 10 mi (16 km) southwest of Canton in west-central Van Zandt County near the Kaufman County line.

== Education ==
Wise School was established in 1890 and had 79 students in 1904. Since 1949, it has been served by the Mabank Independent School District.
