= Edgewood Independent School District =

Edgewood Independent School District may refer to:

- Edgewood Independent School District (Bexar County, Texas)
- Edgewood Independent School District (Van Zandt County, Texas)
