= Primrose, Van Zandt County, Texas =

Primrose, Texas
- Unincorporated community
- Location within Texas Location within the United States
- Coordinates: 32°26′0.51″N 95°36′15″W
- Country: United States
- State: Texas
- County: Van Zandt
- Elevation: 509 ft (155 m)
- Time zone: UTC-6 (Central (CST))
  - Summer (DST): UTC-5 (CDT)
- Area codes: 903 & 430
- GNIS feature ID: 2034649

Primrose is an unincorporated community in Van Zandt County, Texas, United States. According to the Handbook of Texas, the community had a population of 24 in 2000.

== Geography ==
Primrose is located on Farm to Market Road 314, 17 mi (27 km) southeast of Canton in southeastern Van Zandt County.

== Education ==
Primrose had its own school in the 1930s. Since the 1950s, Primrose has been served by the Van Independent School District.
