= Watkins, Van Zandt County, Texas =

Ghost town in Texas, US

Watkins
- Ghost town
- Location in Texas
- Coordinates: 32.5395807°N 96.0277476°W
- Country: United States
- State: Texas
- County: Van Zandt
- Elevation: 479 ft (146 m)

Watkins is a ghost town in Van Zandt County, Texas, United States.

== History ==
Watkins is situated near Farm to Market Road 47 and is south of Texas State Highway 243. Its school enrolled 75 students in 1905, and was consolidated by Canton Independent School District in 1952.
