= Grand Saline High School =

Location
- 500 Stadium Dr. Grand Saline, Texas 75140-1038; United States; 32.68556°N 95.71375°W

Information
- School type: Public high school
- Motto: Truth, Honor, Loyalty, Indian Pride!
- Established: 1925; 101 years ago
- School district: Grand Saline Independent School District
- Principal: Ricky LaPrade
- Staff: 31.08 (FTE)
- Grades: 9–12
- Enrollment: 363 (2024–2025)
- Student to teacher ratio: 11.68
- Colors: Black; Orange
- Athletics conference: UIL Class 3A
- Mascot: Indian
- Newspaper: Tomahawk Express
- Website: Grand Saline High School website

Grand Saline High School is a public high school located in Grand Saline, Texas (USA) and classified as a 3A school by the UIL. It is part of the Grand Saline Independent School District located in northeast Van Zandt County. In 2022–23, the school was rated by the Texas Education Agency as follows: 81 (B) overall, 84 (B) for Student Achievement, 82 (B) for School Progress, and 74 (C) for Closing the Gaps.

== History ==
Grand Saline's first high school was built in 1925 approximately 2 miles from its present location. It was originally part of a school building that housed over 300 total students. In the 1940s Grand Saline ISD had fully consolidated with the rural communities and built a school to house grades 1–6 and ease the crowded school. Shortly thereafter, Person's Stadium, the district's first football stadium, was built. In 1963 Grand Saline's Board of Education and the citizens approved the construction of a new high school, a new gymnasium and renovations to Person's Stadium. The new high school was finished in 1964 along with Stadium Drive, which was built for access to the new high school and Person's Stadium. Renovations would not come again until 1992, when GSISD voters approved a bond issue that built a cafetorium, a new parking lot, and additional classroom buildings to ease crowding. The bond issue also added a student commons area which would connect the gymnasium and the classroom wings and create one building. Additionally, voters approved the construction of Indian Memorial Stadium, a new football stadium with an olympic quality track and field set-up and a seating capacity of 4,500 fans, replacing the aging Person's Stadium, which became a practice field.

In late 1999, due to a steady growth in the district, school district officials sought out community and district opinion regarding building a new high school building on open pasture land next to the current high school at the time. In the Spring of 2000, voters approved the bond issue to build a new high school at the price of 7 million dollars. Construction began in Summer of 2002 and was opened for classes in Fall of 2004, with the capacity to house 550 students. The old high school became the district's middle school and a new baseball facility was constructed behind the new school and was finished a full year before the new school was. In addition to much bigger classrooms, the new school houses a gymnasium with 3 basketball courts and seating for 1,200 fans, the capacity to host basketball play-off games, a new fine arts auditorium and a library.

== Academics ==
GSHS has an agreement with nearby Tyler Junior College for college bound Juniors and Seniors to earn both high school and college credit while taking classes. Also, students who plan to major in Nursing or Pharmacy/Pharmacy Tech. programs also have pre-college classes available to them. GSHS has had higher than above average SAT and ACT scores and above average rate of college bound graduating Seniors.

== Fine Arts ==
GSHS offers students programs in Drama, Marching Band, Choir, Art and Painting Classes. Grand Saline's Theater Department presents several shows each year, including Shakespeare and musical theatre. Additionally, the theater department has a strong program in East Texas competing in numerous One Act play performances. The Indian Marching Band has achieved both Regional and State Wide honors earning UIL "Sweepstakes" awards for its Marching Band performances.

== Academic Championships ==
2016 State Championship Math Team (Coach: Carter Elliott)

2022 State Championship Lincoln-Douglas Debate (Coach: Michael Mattis)

2019, 2022 Speech Team Regional Champion Runner-up

2018, 2019, 2020, 2022 Academic District Champions

2017, 2018, 2019, 2020, 2021, 2022 CX Debate District Champions

2018, 2019, 2020, 2021, 2022 Speech District Champions

== Athletics ==
The Grand Saline Indians compete in the following sports -

Cross Country, Volleyball, Football, Basketball, Powerlifting, Soccer, Golf, Tennis, Track, Softball & Baseball.

== Grand Saline Indian Football ==
Grand Saline Football has a rich tradition in East Texas. The Indians have been competing since 1923, and have won numerous district, Bi-District and Area titles. The best teams in school history were the 1982 team, which allowed opponents only 4 points per game while averaging 37 a game, the 1990 team which lost to state power and eventual champion Groveton after posting a 12–1 record and finishing ranked 4th in the state, and the 1999 team, which lost to state power and eventual champion Celina after posting a 12–1 record. The most successful eras for Indian football were the 1940s, 1980s, 1990s and early 2000s. From 1982 to 2003, the Indian Football program amassed a win–loss–tie record of 180–75–2 (.700 winning percentage), with 18 Texas State Playoff appearances, 10 district championships, and 9 seasons of 10 wins or more. Carter Elliott is the most successful coach in the history of the program, leading the Indians to 5 regional finals berths. He was the head coach from 1978 to 1991 and from 1997 to 2000. The Indians started to downturn in 2004 by going 3–7 that season and missing the playoffs. From 2004–2014, Grand Saline had 4 head coaches and went 25–86. In 2013, GSHS alumnus and former All-State Indian Football player Mike Ridge was named athletic director and head football coach. Ridge had back to back winless seasons due to injuries, lower participation, and being realigned to Class AAA Division I. In 2015, the streak was snapped as Ridge led the Indians to a district championship, a .500 regular season, and took the Indians back to the playoffs for the first time since 2007. Ridge also led program to back to back winning seasons and playoff appearances and a bi-district championship in 2018 and 2019, respectively. The Indians are coached by Joe Drennon, who won a Texas State Championship with rival Mineola High School in 2016, before arriving in Grand Saline in 2020. Drennon's first two seasons produced a 5-14 record and one playoff appearance from 2020-2021. However, since 2022 he has led the Indians to the playoffs in 4 of 5 seasons and has posted a 40-14 record in addition to 2 district championships, 2 undefeated regular seasons, and a bi-district championship.

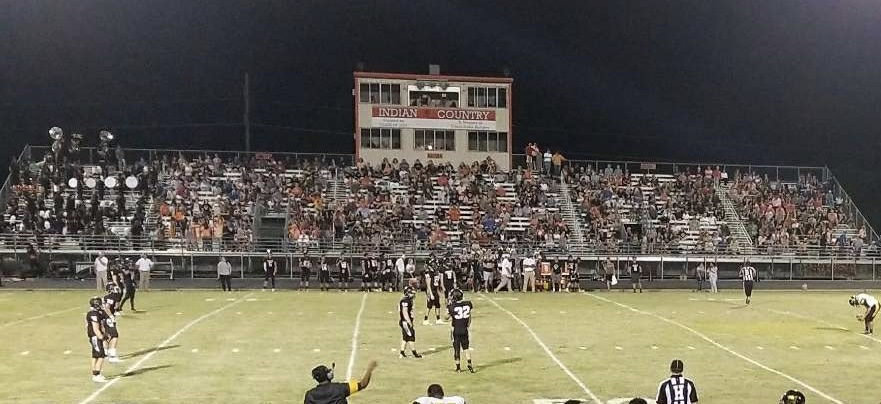
Grand Saline Indians against the Winona Wildcats at Indian Memorial Stadium in September 2016.

Grand Saline Indian Football Tradition-

- Texas State Playoffs-1933, 1940, 1941, 1949, 1982, 1983, 1984, 1985, 1986, 1987, 1988, 1989, 1990, 1991, 1994, 1995, 1996, 1997, 1998, 1999, 2002, 2003, 2005, 2007, 2015, 2018, 2019, 2020, 2022, 2024, 2025, 2026.
- District Champions-1933, 1940, 1941, 1949, 1982, 1983, 1984, 1988, 1989, 1990, 1991, 1996, 1998, 1999, 2015, 2024, 2026.
- Bi-District Champions-1940, 1949, 1982, 1983, 1984, 1985, 1987, 1988, 1990, 1991, 1994, 1995, 1996, 1997, 1998, 1999, 2018, 2024, 2026.
- Area Champions-1982, 1983, 1988, 1990, 1991, 1995, 1996, 1998, 1999.
- Regional Finalists-1949, 1982, 1983, 1988, 1990, 1998, 1999.
- State Quarterfinals-1982, 1983.

== Athletic championships ==
GSHS also has strong traditions in Baseball, Softball, Tennis, and Track and Field.

State Champions-

- Men's Tennis Doubles-1981
- Men's Tennis Singles-1983
- Men's Tennis Doubles-1984
- Men's Tennis Doubles-1992
- Men's Track & Field (Pole Vault)-2009
- Men's Track & Field (Discus Throw)-2010

State Finalists:

- Men's Basketball - 1973
- Women's Tennis Doubles-1999
- Women's Tennis Doubles-2002
- Men's Tennis Doubles-2003
- Men's Track & Field-2003
- Men's Track & Field-2004
- Men's Cross County-2004
- Men's Cross Country-2005
- Women's Cross Country-2005
- Men's Track and Field-2006
- Women's Track and Field-2006
- Men's Track and Field-2011
- Men's Cross Country-2011
  - Regional Finalists-
- Football-1982
- Football-1983
- Football-1988
- Football-1990
- Football-1998
- Football-1999
- Men's Cross Country-2001
- Men's Cross Country-2003

=== Rivalries ===
Grand Saline has rivalries with 4 schools due to its proximity to the schools. Rivals are:

Van High School Vandals - Highway 110 Rivalry. Grand Saline and Van have the third longest streak in Texas High School Football history of playing each other every year, currently at 85 straight games. The Football rivalry went defunct in 2012 due to mutual desires to play schools of similar sizes, however both still enjoy the rivalry in Basketball, Baseball, Softball, and Tennis.

Quitman High School (Texas) Bulldogs - Rivalry developed in the 1980s mainly around football, rivalry heated back up in 2002 when QHS dropped from UIL conference AAA and back to AA and has been in GSHS's conference ever since. This is currently the most heated rivalry.

Edgewood High School Bulldogs - Highway 80 rivalry. Traditionally dominated in Football by Grand Saline and in Basketball by Edgewood, the rivalry continues to thrive as the two schools compete well against each other in all sports and in academic UIL.

Mineola High School (Texas) Yellowjackets - Sabine River Rivalry. Mineola is located just across the Sabine River down US Highway 80 from Grand Saline. The two schools also have a 50-year-old rivalry in football.

== Notable alumni ==
- Chris Tomlin - Grammy Award Winning Christian Music Artist and Songwriter.
- Charles R. Moore-Prominent social activist for various progressive causes and minister in the United Methodist Church.

== Notable events ==
- In 2000, the MTV network filmed an episode for their show True Life entitled "I'm a Football Hero" at Grand Saline High School and around the town. The episode chronicled the Indian's season up to that point as they were 12–0 and at the time had the best offense in the State, and their run toward a Class AA State football championship. It also featured the Indian's playoff rival, perennial Texas Football powerhouse Celina Bobcats from Celina, Texas and the highlights of the game itself, played at Pennington Field in Bedford, Texas.
- In 2009, two federally wanted bank robbers called a bomb threat into the high school and caused the evacuation of all 3 campuses on Stadium Drive. The threat, however was a diversion, as the bank robbers took over and robbed a local bank in downtown Grand Saline as local authorities were occupied with the bomb threat on the opposite side of the city. The FBI however apprehended the suspects and they were taken into federal custody
