= Mars, Texas =

Ghost town in Van Zandt County, Texas, United States

- Ghost town
- Location within Texas Location within the United States
- Coordinates: 32°21′34″N 95°43′33″W
- Country: United States
- State: Texas
- County: Van Zandt
- Elevation: 459 ft (140 m)
- Time zone: UTC-6 (Central (CST))
  - Summer (DST): UTC-5 (CDT)
- GNIS feature ID: 2034766

Mars is a ghost town in Van Zandt County, Texas, United States.

Once a retail center for the surrounding community, all that remains of the settlement is a church.

== History ==
Mars was settled by brothers John and Henry Marrs.

The settlement was a retail trading center, and had two mercantile stores, a blacksmith shop, and a cotton gin and grist mill.

The Pleasant Ridge Church and school were established in 1871. In 1916, the school consolidated to form the Clower Common School District (Clower is located approximately 15 mi (24 km) north of Mars).

In 1891, a post office was established, originally called "Acme". The name was changed to "Mars" seven years later. The post office closed in 1907.

The population of Mars was over 100 in 1915, and had declined to 50 in 1945.

The Pleasant Ridge Church is all that remains of the settlement.

== See also ==
- List of ghost towns in Texas
