= Van Zandt County Courthouse =

- U.S. National Register of Historic Places
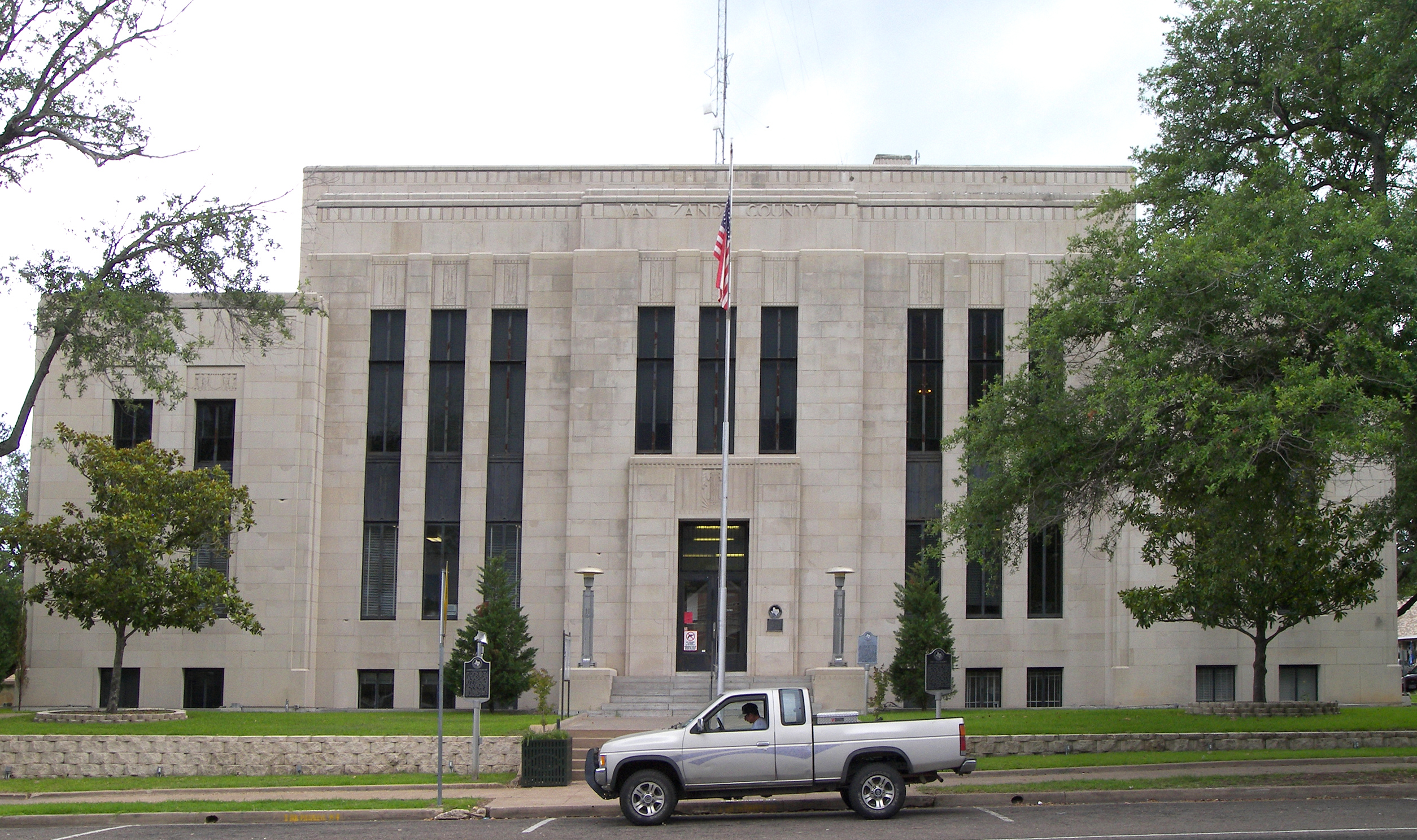

- Location within Texas Location within the United States
- Interactive map showing the location of Van Zandt County Courthouse
- Location: 121 E. Dallas St., Canton, Texas
- Coordinates: 32.556215°N 95.863074°W
- Area: less than one acre
- Built: 1937
- Architect: Voelcker & Dixon
- Architectural style: Art Deco
- NRHP reference No.: 100000698
- Added to NRHP: August 18, 1977

Van Zandt County Courthouse is a historic courthouse in Canton, Texas. It is listed on the National Register of Historic Places.

== History ==
There have been six courthouses serving Van Zandt County. The first courthouse, in Jordan's Saline, was constructed in 1848 in a Greek Revival style. The second courthouse, constructed in 1850, was a log cabin in Canton. The third courthouse was a brick structure built in 1859, also in Canton. The fourth courthouse was a two-story structure built in 1873 in Canton. The fifth courthouse was a brick building constructed in a Richardsonian Romanesque style in 1896 in Canton. It was razed to make room for a new courthouse in 1925.

The sixth and current Van Zandt County Courthouse was built from 1936 to 1937 using special county funds and a grant from the federal Public Works Administration. The building was designed by Voelcker & Dixon in an Art Deco style.

The building was listed on the National Register of Historic Places in 2017.
