= Van Zandt County, Texas =

County in Texas, United States

- County
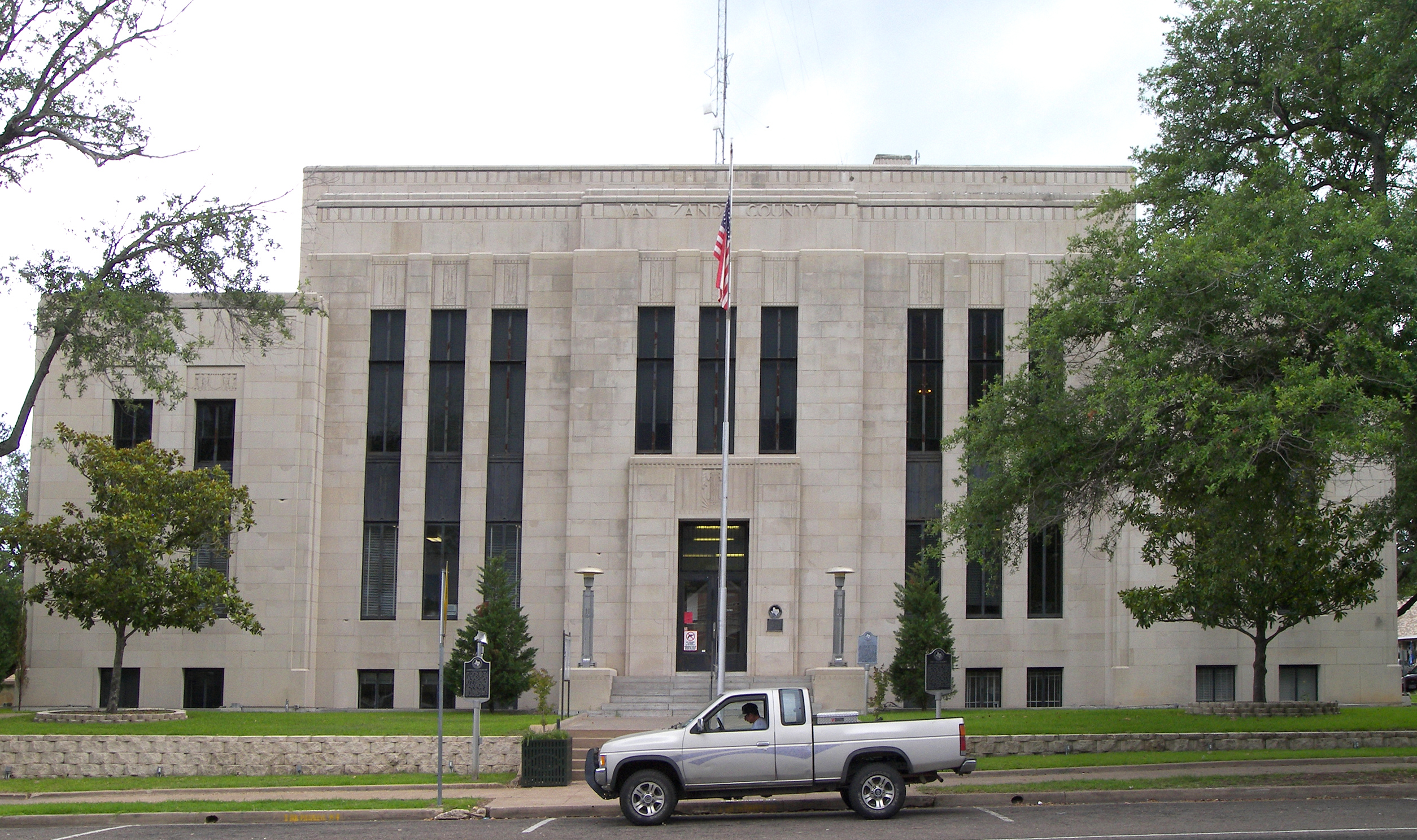
- The Van Zandt County Courthouse in Canton

- Location within the U.S. state of Texas
- Coordinates: 32°34′N 95°50′W
- Country: United States
- State: Texas
- Founded: 1848
- Named for: Isaac Van Zandt
- Seat: Canton
- Largest city: Canton

Area
  - Total: 860 sq mi (2,200 km^{2})
  - Land: 843 sq mi (2,180 km^{2})
  - Water: 17 sq mi (44 km^{2}) 2.0%

Population (2020)
  - Total: 59,541
  - Estimate (2025): 66,130 ▲
  - Density: 70.6/sq mi (27.3/km^{2})
- Time zone: UTC−6 (Central)
  - Summer (DST): UTC−5 (CDT)
- Congressional district: 5th
- Website: www.vanzandtcounty.org

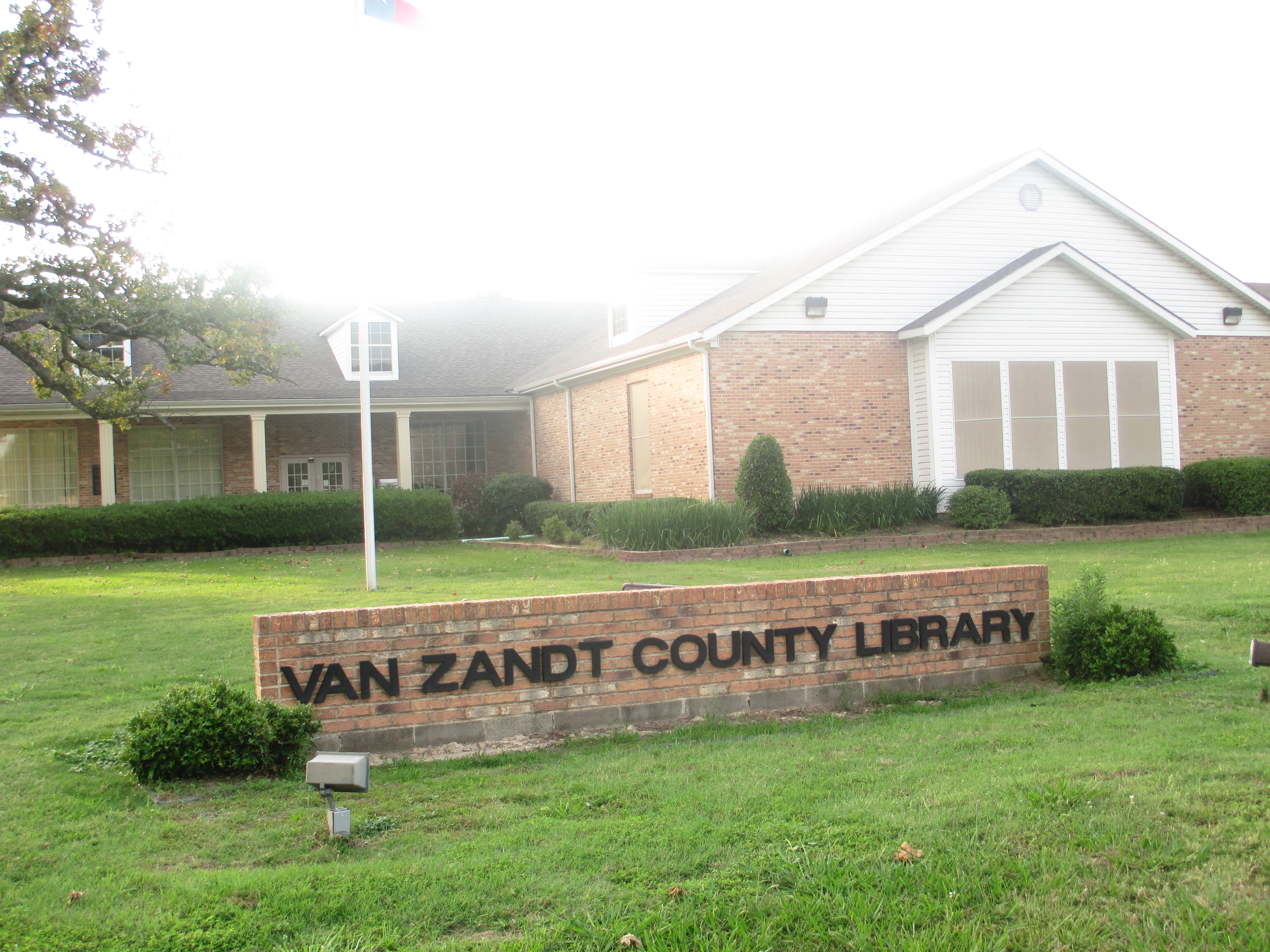
The Van Zandt County Library is located next to the Blackwell House Museum in Canton, Texas.

Van Zandt County is a county located in the U.S. state of Texas, in the northeastern part of the state. As of the 2020 census, its population was 59,541. Its county seat is Canton. The county is named for Isaac Van Zandt (1813–1847), a member of the Congress of the Republic of Texas.

== History ==
Van Zandt County is commonly known as the Free State of Van Zandt. The title was particularly prevalent through the Reconstruction Era, but is still in use today. Many versions of the county's history may account for this moniker, and historians, even within the county and throughout its existence, do not agree how exactly it became known as the Free State.

One story of how the Free State of Van Zandt came to be originates with the county's formation. In 1848, Henderson County was split into three counties: Kaufman, Van Zandt, and what remained as Henderson County. Henderson County had been deeply in debt, yet the new Van Zandt County was founded without any obligations. Many believed that this was a mistake on the state's part, and bitter citizens and politicians from Henderson County referred to the new county as the Free State.

Van Zandt County tried on two distinct occasions to separate itself from Texas. The first was in 1861 when Texas seceded from the United States. About 350 citizens of Van Zandt County met to protest the secession. The practice of slavery was infrequent in the county. Slave owners, worried about losing their slaves in the Civil War, refused to bring their slaves to Van Zandt, because slavery was so uncommon there. The majority of Van Zandt wanted to stay with the Union, and reasoned that if Texas could secede from the United States, they could secede from Texas, and began organizing a government until they were threatened with military intervention. Although the secession was unsuccessful, the title of "Free State" stuck.

After Texas re-entered the Union after the Civil War, Van Zandt County again tried to secede from Texas, the Confederate States of America, and the United States. A convention was held in 1867 in which the citizens elected delegates, and the delegates voted for secession, and penned a Declaration of Independence modeled after the United States Declaration of Independence. The event was seen as a rebellion by the nation, and when word reached General Sheridan, he dispatched a cavalry unit to quell it. The citizens of Van Zandt called an emergency meeting that ended with the delegates declaring war on the United States. The wooded landscape at the time made moving difficult for horses, so the citizens of Van Zandt, familiar with the area, were able to ambush the unit, until they retreated. The citizens, elated with their victory, celebrated with an excess of alcohol. During their celebration, they were surrounded by Sheridan's troops, and were put in anklets and in a makeshift jail of wooden posts. Two ex-Confederate soldiers, W.A. Allen and Hardy Allen, were in the group, and W.A. Allen used a hidden knife to wear down the anklets. A combination of the beginning of the rainy season and a decreasing of the guard to one man allowed the prisoners to easily escape. After that, not much action on the part of the United States was taken in the issue. Arrest warrants were sent, but none were carried out, and none of the rebels went to trial.

== Geography ==
According to the U.S. Census Bureau, the county has a total area of 860 sq mi (2,200 km^{2}), of which 17 square miles (44 km^{2}) (2.0%) are covered by water. Van Zandt County is unique in topography. The western and northwestern parts of the county are in the eastern edge of the Texas Blackland Prairies, the central part of the county is located in the post oak belt of Northeast Texas, and the eastern part of the county stretches into the East Texas Piney Woods. Two major rivers, the Neches and the Sabine, flow through Van Zandt County. Van Zandt County is referred to as the "Gateway to East Texas" due to its diverse topography.

=== Major highways ===
- Interstate 20
- U.S. Highway 80
- State Highway 19
- State Highway 64
- State Highway 110
- State Highway 198
- State Highway 243

=== Adjacent counties ===
- Rains County (north)
- Wood County (northeast)
- Smith County (east)
- Henderson County (south)
- Kaufman County (west)
- Hunt County (northwest)

== Communities ==
=== Cities ===
- Canton (county seat)
- Edgewood
- Edom
- Fruitvale
- Grand Saline
- Van
- Wills Point

=== Census-designated places ===
- Ben Wheeler
- Callender Lake
- Myrtle Springs

=== Other unincorporated communities ===
- Alsa
- Colfax
- Martin's Mill
- Midway
- Oakland
- Phalba
- Primrose
- Silver Lake
- Tundra
- Walton
- Wentworth
- Wise

=== Ghost towns ===
- Cana
- Clifton
- Clower
- Corinth
- Denman Crossroads
- Elwood
- Four Mile Prairie
- Holly Springs
- Jackson
- Jones
- Lawrence Springs
- Mars
- Odom
- Owlet Green
- Pruitt
- Redland
- Roddy
- Sand Flat
- Scott
- Small
- Wallace
- Watkins
- Whitton

== Demographics ==
Historical population
Census	Pop.	Note	%±
1850	1,348		—
1860	3,777		180.2%
1870	6,494		71.9%
1880	12,619		94.3%
1890	16,225		28.6%
1900	25,481		57.0%
1910	25,651		0.7%
1920	30,784		20.0%
1930	32,315		5.0%
1940	31,155		−3.6%
1950	22,593		−27.5%
1960	19,091		−15.5%
1970	22,155		16.0%
1980	31,426		41.8%
1990	37,944		20.7%
2000	48,140		26.9%
2010	52,579		9.2%
2020	59,541		13.2%
2025 (est.)	66,130	▲	11.1%
U.S. Decennial Census; 1850–2010 2010 2020

=== Racial and ethnic composition ===
Van Zandt County, Texas – Racial and ethnic composition Note: the US Census treats Hispanic/Latino as an ethnic category. This table excludes Latinos from the racial categories and assigns them to a separate category. Hispanics/Latinos may be of any race.
Race / Ethnicity (NH = Non-Hispanic)	Pop 1980	Pop 1990	Pop 2000	Pop 2010	Pop 2020	% 1980	% 1990	% 2000	% 2010	% 2020
White alone (NH)	29,503	34,786	42,619	45,087	47,986	93.88%	91.68%	88.53%	85.75%	80.59%
Black or African American alone (NH)	1,282	1,451	1,390	1,403	1,517	4.08%	3.82%	2.89%	2.67%	2.55%
Native American or Alaska Native alone (NH)	48	148	231	371	328	0.15%	0.39%	0.48%	0.71%	0.55%
Asian alone (NH)	20	41	84	168	272	0.06%	0.11%	0.17%	0.32%	0.46%
Native Hawaiian or Pacific Islander alone (NH)	x	x	10	32	30	x	x	0.02%	0.06%	0.05%
Other race alone (NH)	15	3	5	15	133	0.05%	0.01%	0.01%	0.03%	0.22%
Mixed race or Multiracial (NH)	x	x	600	656	2,204	x	x	1.25%	1.25%	3.70%
Hispanic or Latino (any race)	558	1,515	3,201	4,847	7,071	1.78%	3.99%	6.65%	9.22%	11.88%
Total	31,426	37,944	48,140	52,579	59,541	100.00%	100.00%	100.00%	100.00%	100.00%

=== 2020 census ===
As of the 2020 census, the county had a population of 59,541. The median age was 43.4 years. 22.8% of residents were under the age of 18 and 21.2% of residents were 65 years of age or older. For every 100 females there were 97.1 males, and for every 100 females age 18 and over, there were 95.3 males age 18 and over.

The racial makeup of the county was 83.8% White, 2.6% Black or African American, 0.8% American Indian and Alaska Native, 0.5% Asian, 0.1% Native Hawaiian and Pacific Islander, 4.3% from some other race, and 8.0% from two or more races. Hispanic or Latino residents of any race comprised 11.9% of the population.

<0.1% of residents lived in urban areas, while 100.0% lived in rural areas.

There were 22,815 households in the county, of which 30.5% had children under the age of 18 living in them. Of all households, 54.1% were married-couple households, 17.3% were households with a male householder and no spouse or partner present, and 23.5% were households with a female householder and no spouse or partner present. About 25.2% of all households were made up of individuals and 12.9% had someone living alone who was 65 years of age or older.

There were 25,537 housing units, of which 10.7% were vacant. Among occupied housing units, 76.7% were owner-occupied and 23.3% were renter-occupied. The homeowner vacancy rate was 1.6% and the rental vacancy rate was 6.1%.

=== 2000 census ===
As of the census of 2000, 48,140 people, 18,195 households, and 13,664 families resided in the county. The population density was 57 people per square mile (22 people/km^{2}). The 20,896 housing units averaged 25 units per square mile (9.7 units/km^{2}). The racial makeup of the county was 91.96% White, 2.94% African American, 0.62% Native American, 0.18% Asian, 2.74% from other races, and 1.56% from two or more races. About 6.65% of the population was Hispanic or Latino of any race.

Of the 18,195 households, 31.80% had children under the age of 18 living with them, 62.60% were married couples living together, 8.70% had a female householder with no husband present, and 24.90% were not families. Around 22.00% of all households were made up of individuals, and 11.60% had someone living alone who was 65 years of age or older. The average household size was 2.59 and the average family size was 3.01.

In the county, the population was distributed as 25.50% under the age of 18, 7.30% from 18 to 24, 25.20% from 25 to 44, 24.90% from 45 to 64, and 17.00% who were 65 years of age or older. The median age was 40 years. For every 100 females, there were 97.00 males. For every 100 females age 18 and over, there were 93.70 males.

The median income for a household in the county was $35,029, and for a family was $41,175. Males had a median income of $31,887 versus $21,344 for females. The per capita income for the county was $16,930. About 10.30% of families and 13.30% of the population were below the poverty line, including 15.90% of those under age 18 and 12.10% of those age 65 or over.

== Education ==
These school districts serve Van Zandt County:

- Canton ISD
- Edgewood ISD
- Fruitvale ISD
- Grand Saline ISD
- Martin's Mill ISD
- Van ISD
- Wills Point ISD

== Media ==
The only radio station licensed to Van Zandt County is KWJB, broadcasting on 1510 AM and 95.1 FM. Van Zandt County receives outlying signals on the outer signal edges of Dallas/Fort Worth DMA. Local media outlets are KDFW-TV, KXAS-TV, WFAA-TV, KTVT-TV, KERA-TV, KTXA-TV, KDFI-TV, KDAF-TV, and KFWD-TV. Other nearby stations that provide coverage for Van Zandt County come from the Tyler/Longview/Jacksonville market, and include KLTV, KYTX-TV, KFXK-TV, KCEB-TV, and KETK-TV.

=== Newspapers and publications ===
- Canton Guide
- Canton Herald
- East Texas Homes and Farms
- Grand Saline Sun
- Van Zandt County News
- Wills Point Chronicle

== Government and politics ==
Van Zandt County is located within District 2 of the Texas House of Representatives. Van Zandt County is located within District 2 of the Texas Senate.

=== County commissioners ===
Office	Name	Party
County judge	Andy Reese	Republican
Commissioner, precinct 1	Mitch Curtis	Republican
Commissioner, precinct 2	Cliff Williams	Republican
Commissioner, precinct 3	Bobby Phillips	Republican
Commissioner, precinct 4	Brandon Barton	Republican

=== County officials ===
Office	Name	Party
County clerk	Susan Strickland	Republican
Sheriff	Kevin Bridger	Republican
Tax assessor-collector	Misty Stanberry	Republican
Treasurer	Kenny Edwards	Republican

United States presidential election results for Van Zandt County, Texas
Year	Republican		Democratic		Third party(ies)	
Year	No.	%	No.	%	No.	%
1912	110	3.87%	1,790	62.90%	946	33.24%
1916	232	7.92%	2,040	69.60%	659	22.48%
1920	728	22.71%	1,958	61.07%	520	16.22%
1924	0	0.00%	3,957	100.00%	0	0.00%
1928	1,502	45.35%	1,789	54.02%	21	0.63%
1932	190	4.29%	4,203	94.92%	35	0.79%
1936	245	6.94%	3,257	92.24%	29	0.82%
1940	721	12.62%	4,975	87.05%	19	0.33%
1944	503	11.96%	3,139	74.65%	563	13.39%
1948	578	13.29%	3,264	75.03%	508	11.68%
1952	2,279	36.74%	3,911	63.05%	13	0.21%
1956	2,142	42.25%	2,919	57.57%	9	0.18%
1960	2,120	42.68%	2,825	56.88%	22	0.44%
1964	1,614	28.44%	4,047	71.30%	15	0.26%
1968	1,954	28.94%	2,706	40.08%	2,091	30.97%
1972	4,839	71.33%	1,939	28.58%	6	0.09%
1976	3,385	34.20%	6,449	65.15%	64	0.65%
1980	5,495	48.46%	5,707	50.33%	138	1.22%
1984	8,474	65.17%	4,506	34.65%	23	0.18%
1988	7,371	54.36%	6,153	45.38%	35	0.26%
1992	5,810	35.44%	5,310	32.39%	5,276	32.18%
1996	7,453	49.60%	5,752	38.28%	1,821	12.12%
2000	12,383	69.21%	5,245	29.32%	263	1.47%
2004	14,976	75.42%	4,822	24.28%	58	0.29%
2008	15,734	77.15%	4,505	22.09%	156	0.76%
2012	15,794	82.69%	3,084	16.15%	222	1.16%
2016	18,473	84.39%	2,799	12.79%	618	2.82%
2020	22,270	85.56%	3,516	13.51%	243	0.93%
2024	24,351	87.12%	3,450	12.34%	149	0.53%

United States Senate election results for Van Zandt County, Texas1
Year	Republican		Democratic		Third party(ies)	
Year	No.	%	No.	%	No.	%
2024	23,626	84.60%	3,838	13.74%	463	1.66%

United States Senate election results for Val Zandt County, Texas2
Year	Republican		Democratic		Third party(ies)	
Year	No.	%	No.	%	No.	%
2020	22,010	85.37%	3,374	13.09%	398	1.54%
2026	17,551	79.23%	4,051	18.29%	551	2.49%

Texas Gubernatorial election results for Val Zandt County
Year	Republican		Democratic		Third party(ies)	
Year	No.	%	No.	%	No.	%
2022	17,773	87.21%	2,414	11.85%	192	0.94%
2026	17,973	80.83%	3,888	17.49%	375	1.69%

== Transportation ==
=== Airports ===
- Van Zandt County Regional Airport (Wills Point)
- Canton-Hackney Airport (Canton)

== See also ==
- National Register of Historic Places listings in Van Zandt County, Texas
- Recorded Texas Historic Landmarks in Van Zandt County
- Bob Hall, member of the Texas State Senate from Van Zandt County

== Sources ==
- Clausen, C. A. ed., The Lady with the Pen: Elise Wærenskjold in Texas (Northfield, Minnesota: Norwegian-American Historical Association, 1961)
- Hall, Margaret Elizabeth A History of Van Zandt County (Austin, Texas: Jenkins, 1976)
