= Colten Brewer =

American baseball player (born 1992)

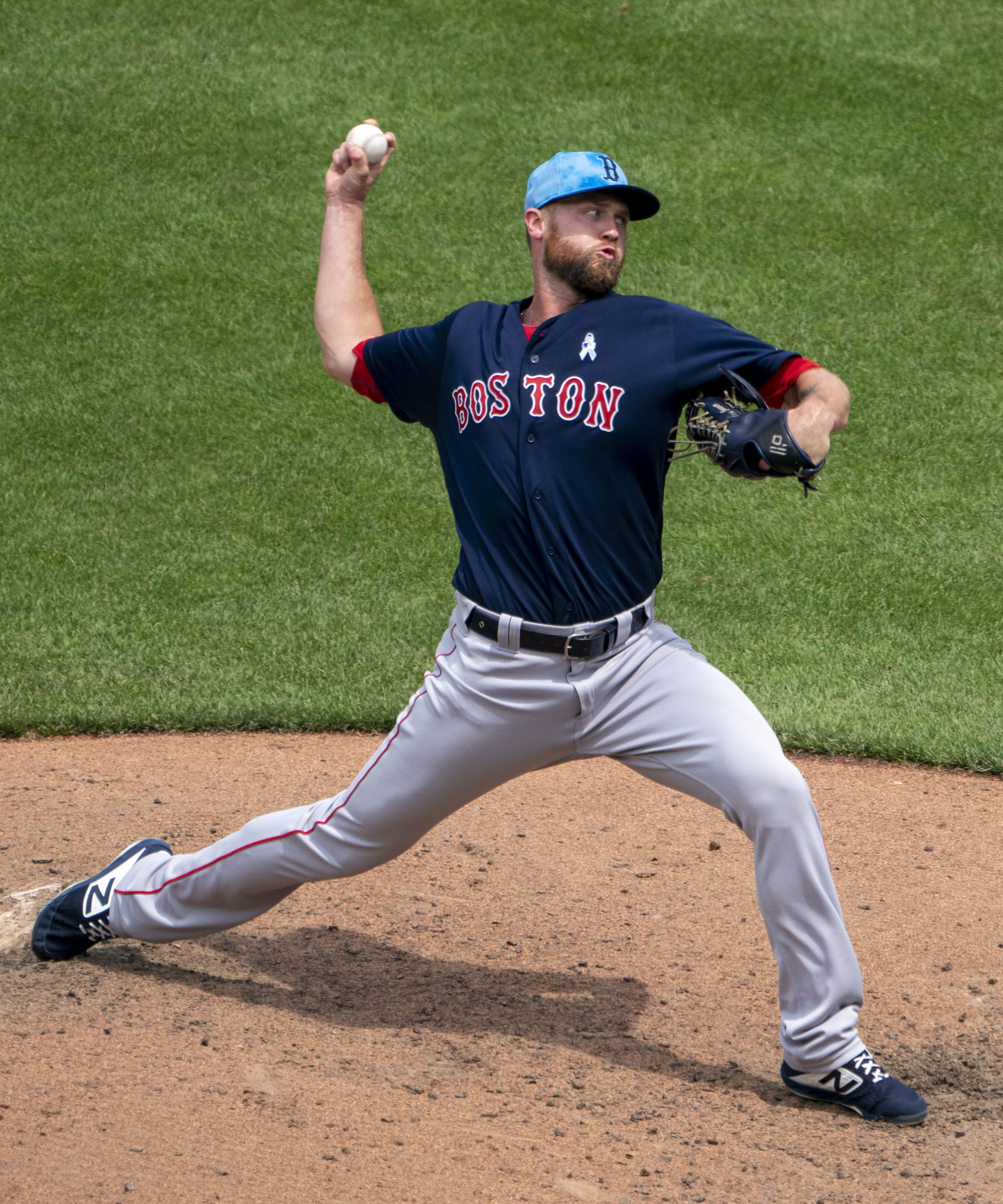
- Brewer with the Boston Red Sox in 2019

Acereros de Monclova – No. 57
- Pitcher
- Born: October 29, 1992 (age 34); Dallas, Texas, U.S.
- Bats: Right Throws: Right

Professional debut
- MLB: April 12, 2018, for the San Diego Padres
- NPB: August 15, 2023, for the Hanshin Tigers

MLB statistics (through 2024 season)
- Win–loss record: 2–5
- Earned run average: 5.10
- Strikeouts: 114

NPB statistics (through 2023 season)
- Win–loss record: 0–1
- Earned run average: 2.38
- Strikeouts: 14
- Stats at Baseball Reference

Teams
- San Diego Padres (2018); Boston Red Sox (2019–2021); New York Yankees (2023); Hanshin Tigers (2023); Chicago Cubs (2024)

Career highlights and awards
- NPB: Japan Series champion (2023)

Colten Bradley Brewer (born October 29, 1992) is an American professional baseball pitcher for the Acereros de Monclova of the Mexican League. He has previously played in Major League Baseball (MLB) for the Boston Red Sox, New York Yankees, San Diego Padres, and Chicago Cubs. He has also played in Nippon Professional Baseball (NPB) for the Hanshin Tigers. Listed at 230 pounds (100 kg) and 6 feet 4 inches (1.93 m), Brewer both throws and bats right-handed.

== Career ==
=== Pittsburgh Pirates ===
Brewer attended Canton High School in Canton, Texas. The Pittsburgh Pirates selected Brewer in the fourth round of the 2011 Major League Baseball draft, and he signed. Brewer made his professional debut in 2012 with the rookie–level Gulf Coast League Pirates, where he had a 1–3 win–loss record with a 3.24 earned run average (ERA) in eight games played (six games started). He began 2013 with the Low–A Jamestown Jammers, but played in only three games due to injury, and subsequently missed all of the 2014 season. In 2015, Brewer pitched for the Single–A West Virginia Power where he was 5–9 with a 4.90 ERA in 22 starts. In 2016, he played with the High–A Bradenton Marauders where he pitched to a 3–7 record with a 4.09 ERA in 18 games (13 starts).

=== New York Yankees ===
On December 6, 2016, the New York Yankees selected Brewer from the Pirates in the minor league phase of the Rule 5 draft. He split the 2017 season between the High–A Tampa Yankees, Double–A Trenton Thunder, and Triple–A Scranton/Wilkes-Barre RailRiders. In 41 relief appearances between the three affiliates, Brewer was 3–1 with a 2.82 ERA and 69 strikeouts in 62 2/3 innings pitched. He elected free agency following the season on November 6, 2017.

=== San Diego Padres ===
On November 22, 2017, Brewer signed a major league contract with the San Diego Padres. He began 2018 with the Triple-A El Paso Chihuahuas. San Diego called up Brewer to the major leagues on April 12, 2018, and he made his debut that same night at AT&T Park against the San Francisco Giants. He was optioned back to El Paso the next day, and made additional appearances with the Padres during the latter half of the season.

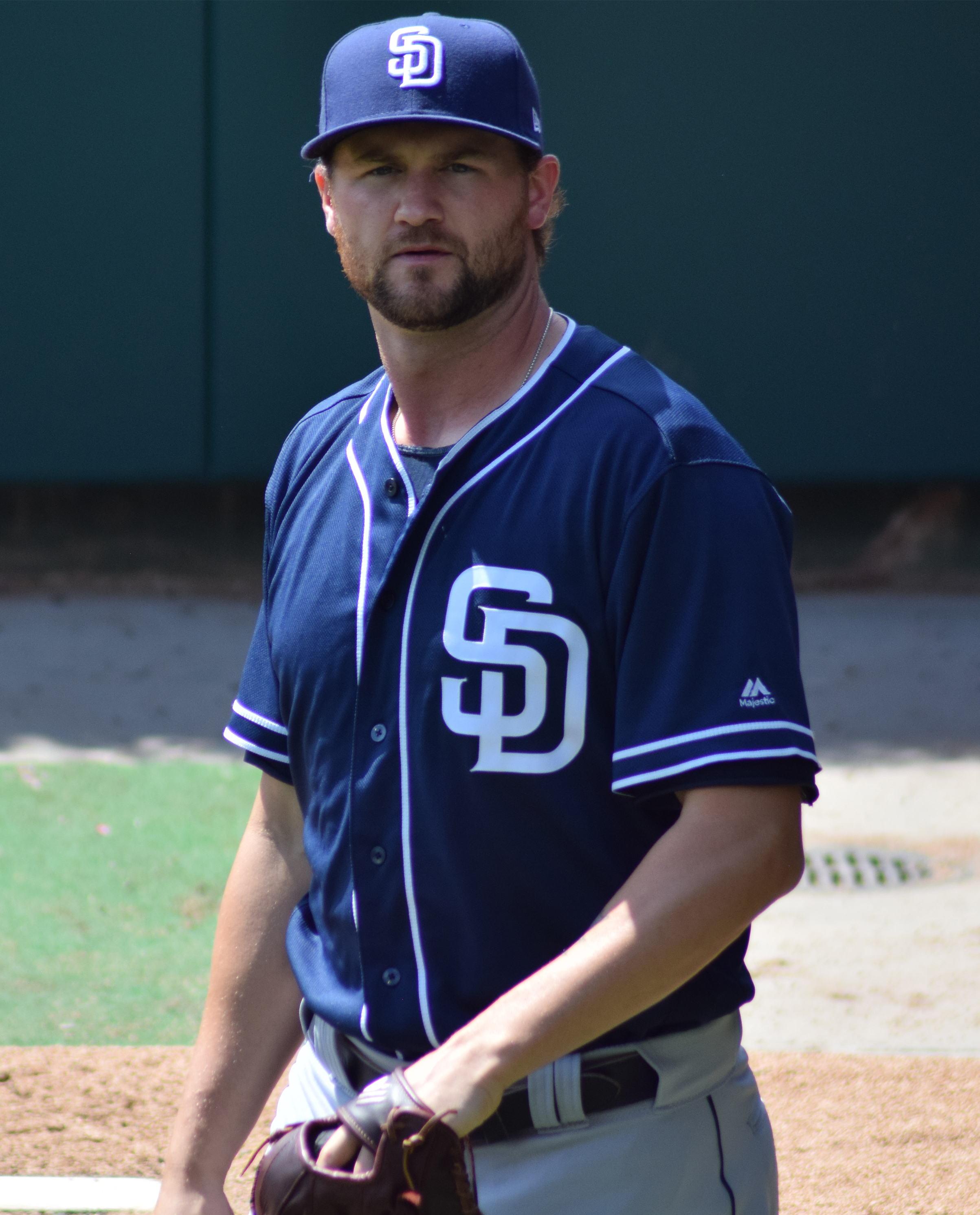
Brewer with the San Diego Padres in 2018

Overall, Brewer made 11 relief appearances for San Diego, recording a 1–0 record with 5.59 ERA and 10 strikeouts in 9 2/3 innings.

=== Boston Red Sox ===
On November 20, 2018, the Padres traded Brewer to the Boston Red Sox for Esteban Quiroz. Brewer was included on Boston's Opening Day roster to start the 2019 season. On May 26, Brewer was optioned to the Triple-A Pawtucket Red Sox; to that point in the season, he had made 20 relief appearances, recording a 5.32 ERA and 0–2 record with 21 strikeouts in 22 innings. He was recalled to Boston on May 29, spending all of June and July with the Red Sox, until being optioned back to Pawtucket on August 4. Brewer was recalled to Boston on September 4, following the end of the Triple-A season. Overall with the 2019 Red Sox, Brewer appeared in 58 games, compiling a 1–2 record with 4.12 ERA and 52 strikeouts in 54 2/3 innings.

On March 26, 2020, the team optioned Brewer to the Double-A Portland Sea Dogs. He was recalled to Boston on July 23, in advance of the delayed start of the 2020 season. Brewer was placed on the 10-day injured list on September 3; he was transferred to the 45-day injured list on September 11. With the 2020 Red Sox, Brewer appeared in 11 games (four starts), compiling an 0–3 record with 5.61 ERA while striking out 25 batters in 25 2/3 innings.

In March 2021, Brewer was optioned to Boston's alternate training site near the end of spring training. After opening the season in Triple-A with the Worcester Red Sox, he was added to Boston's active roster on May 28. In one appearance with Boston, Brewer allowed four runs in one inning pitched. On June 3, he was designated for assignment to make room on the active roster for Brandon Workman. Brewer was outrighted to Triple-A Worcester on June 7. In 11 relief appearances with Worcester, he had a 4.00 ERA while striking out 18 batters in 18 innings. Brewer became a free agent following the season.

=== Kansas City Royals ===
On January 24, 2022, Brewer signed a minor league contract with the Kansas City Royals. He was released on August 3, 2022.

=== New York Yankees (second stint) ===
On December 15, 2022, Brewer signed a minor league contract with the Tampa Bay Rays organization.

The New York Yankees acquired Brewer from the Rays for cash considerations on March 30, 2023, and added him to the active roster on April 1. He made 3 appearances for New York, allowing 4 runs on 6 hits with 4 strikeouts in 8 1/3 innings pitched. The Yankees designated Brewer for assignment on April 14. He cleared waivers and was sent outright to the Triple-A Scranton/Wilkes-Barre RailRiders on April 17. In 15 games for Scranton, he logged a 1.35 ERA with 23 strikeouts in 20 innings pitched. Brewer was released by the Yankees organization on July 7, so he could sign with a team in Japan.

=== Hanshin Tigers ===
On July 9, 2023, Brewer signed with the Hanshin Tigers of Nippon Professional Baseball. In 13 games for Hanshin, Brewer pitched to a 2.38 ERA with 14 strikeouts across 11 1/3 innings of work.

=== Chicago Cubs ===
On December 31, 2023, Brewer signed a contract with the Chicago Cubs. He was assigned to the Triple–A Iowa Cubs, for whom he posted a 1.17 ERA in 6 games. On April 17, 2024, the Cubs added Brewer to their major league roster. In 16 games, he logged a 5.66 ERA with 22 strikeouts. He punched the dugout wall in frustration and suffered a left hand fracture after allowing three runs (one earned), two hits, two walks and a hit batter in a 2/3-inning relief outing in a 7–0 home loss to the Los Angeles Angels on July 6. He was placed on the 60–day injured list the following day. On November 4, Brewer was removed from the 40–man roster and sent outright to Iowa, but he rejected the assignment and elected free agency.

=== New York Yankees (third stint) ===
On December 17, 2024 the New York Yankees signed Brewer to a minor league contract. In 22 appearances for the Triple-A Scranton/Wilkes-Barre RailRiders, he posted a 1-1 record and 3.94 ERA with 32 strikeouts and five saves across 29 2/3 innings pitched. Brewer was released by the Yankees organization after triggering an opt-out clause on July 2, 2025.

=== Leones de Yucatán ===
On January 3, 2026, Brewer signed with the Leones de Yucatán of the Mexican League. In 31 appearances for Yucatán, he registered a 2–1 record with a 3.86 ERA, 22 strikeouts, 10 walks, and eight saves.

=== Acereros de Monclova ===
On July 17, 2026, Brewer was traded to the Acereros de Monclova of the Mexican League in exchange for P Carlos Romero.

== Personal life ==
On December 11, 2020, Brewer married Theresa. On March 14, 2022, Brewer's son Case Bradley was born. On June 26, 2023, Brewer's son Beaux Hoss was born.

== See also ==
- Rule 5 draft results
