= Keavon Milton =

American football player (born 1990)

No. 83, 66
- Position: Offensive tackle

Personal information
- Born: June 23, 1990 (age 36); Canton, Texas, U.S.
- Listed height: 6 ft 4 in (1.93 m)
- Listed weight: 293 lb (133 kg)

Career information
- High school: Canton (TX)
- College: Louisiana–Monroe
- NFL draft: 2013: undrafted

Career history
- New Orleans Saints (2013)*; Cleveland Browns (2013); Seattle Seahawks (2014); New England Patriots (2015–2016)*; Dallas Cowboys (2016)*; Pittsburgh Steelers (2016–2017)*; BC Lions (2017)*
- * Offseason or practice squad member only

Career NFL statistics
- Games played: 9
- Stats at Pro Football Reference

Keavon Milton (born June 23, 1990) is an American former professional football player who was an offensive tackle in the National Football League (NFL). He played college football for the Louisiana–Monroe Warhawks.

Milton was a member of the NFL's New Orleans Saints, Cleveland Browns, Seattle Seahawks, New England Patriots, Dallas Cowboys, and Pittsburgh Steelers, and the BC Lions of the Canadian Football League (CFL).

== Professional career ==
=== New Orleans Saints ===
On April 28, 2013, Milton signed with the New Orleans Saints as an undrafted free agent. On August 31, 2013, he was released.

=== Cleveland Browns ===
On September 1, 2013, Milton was claimed off waivers by the Cleveland Browns. The Browns released Milton on August 25, 2014.

=== Seattle Seahawks ===
After being cut by the Browns, Milton signed with the Seattle Seahawks. They made the playoffs with a 12-4 record, defeating the Carolina Panthers and Green Bay Packers, rolling into Super Bowl XLIX, where the Seahawks lost 28–24 to the New England Patriots.

He was released by the Seahawks on September 5, 2015.

=== New England Patriots ===
Milton was signed to the New England Patriots practice squad on November 10, 2015. On January 26, 2016, Milton signed a futures contract with the New England Patriots. On August 30, 2016, Milton was released by the Patriots.

=== Dallas Cowboys ===
On September 6, 2016, Milton was signed to the Cowboys' practice squad. He was released on October 21, 2016.

=== Pittsburgh Steelers ===
On October 25, 2016, Milton was signed to the Steelers' practice squad. He signed a reserve/future contract with the Steelers on January 24, 2017.

On September 2, 2017, Milton was waived by the Steelers.
