= Whitton, Texas =

- Unincorporated Community
- Interactive map of Whitton, Texas
- Coordinates: 32°28′57″N 95°59′42″W
- Country: United States
- State: Texas
- Counties: Van Zandt
- Elevation: 449 ft (137 m)
- Time zone: UTC-6 (Central (CST))
  - Summer (DST): UTC-5 (CDT)
- ZIP code: 75103
- Area codes: 903, 430
- FIPS code: 78712
- GNIS feature ID: 1379271

Whitton is an unincorporated community in the U.S. state of Texas, located in Van Zandt County.

== History ==
Whitton is located approximately eight miles southwest of Canton in Van Zandt County along Farm-to-Market Road 1651. The community was named for Elijah Whitton, an early settler from Alabama who built a log house that was still standing in the community in the 1990s. The community was sometimes listed as "Whiton," or "Whitten."

Whitton deeded land for a school in 1886. The Whitton, or Greenwood School, as it was later known, was consolidated with Canton Independent School District in 1949.

In 1978 the former school building was converted into a community center.
