= Cana, Texas =

Ghost town in Texas, US

Cana
- Ghost town
- Location in Texas
- Coordinates: 32.5745792°N 96.0146914°W
- Country: United States
- State: Texas
- County: Van Zandt
- Elevation: 443 ft (135 m)

Cana is a ghost town in Van Zandt County, Texas, United States.

== History ==
Cana was settled around 1860 approximately eight miles west of Canton and 10 miles south of Wills Point. By 1987, the community was no longer shown on maps. Cana Baptist Church and the Cana Cemetery remain.
