= Callender Lake, Texas =

- CDP
- Interactive map of Callender Lake, Texas
- Coordinates: 32°22′23″N 95°41′38″W
- Country: United States
- State: Texas
- County: Van Zandt

Area
  - Total: 4.6 sq mi (11.9 km^{2})
  - Land: 4.1 sq mi (10.6 km^{2})
  - Water: 0.50 sq mi (1.3 km^{2})
- Elevation: 423 ft (129 m)

Population (2010)
  - Total: 1,039
  - Density: 254/sq mi (98.0/km^{2})
- Time zone: UTC-6 (Central (CST))
  - Summer (DST): UTC-5 (CDT)
- Zip Code: 75778
- FIPS code: 48-11940
- GNIS feature ID: 2586914

Callender Lake is a census-designated place (CDP) in Van Zandt County, Texas, United States. This was a new CDP for the 2010 census. As of the 2020 census, Callender Lake had a population of 1,090.

== Geography ==
Callender Lake has a total area of 4.6 square miles (12 km^{2}), of which 4.1 square miles (11 km^{2}) is land and 0.5 square miles (1.3 km^{2}) is water.

== Demographics ==
Historical population
| Census | Pop. | Note | %± |
|---|---|---|---|
| 2010 | 1,039 | | — |
| 2020 | 1,090 | | 4.9% |
U.S. Decennial Census; 1850–1900 1910; 1920 1930 1940; 1950 1960 1970; 1980 1990 2000; 2010

Callender Lake first appeared as a census designated place in the 2010 U.S. census.

=== 2020 census ===
Callender Lake CDP, Texas – Racial and ethnic composition Note: the US Census treats Hispanic/Latino as an ethnic category. This table excludes Latinos from the racial categories and assigns them to a separate category. Hispanics/Latinos may be of any race.
| Race / Ethnicity (NH = Non-Hispanic) | Pop 2010 | Pop 2020 | % 2010 | % 2020 |
|---|---|---|---|---|
| White alone (NH) | 944 | 932 | 90.86% | 85.50% |
| Black or African American alone (NH) | 14 | 28 | 1.35% | 2.57% |
| Native American or Alaska Native alone (NH) | 6 | 1 | 0.58% | 0.09% |
| Asian alone (NH) | 0 | 1 | 0.00% | 0.09% |
| Native Hawaiian or Pacific Islander alone (NH) | 5 | 0 | 0.48% | 0.00% |
| Other race alone (NH) | 0 | 0 | 0.00% | 0.00% |
| Mixed race or Multiracial (NH) | 14 | 49 | 1.35% | 4.50% |
| Hispanic or Latino (any race) | 56 | 79 | 5.39% | 7.25% |
| Total | 1,039 | 1,090 | 100.00% | 100.00% |
