= Alsa, Texas =

Unincorporated community in Van Zandt County, Texas, US

- Unincorporated community
- Location within Texas Location within the United States
- Coordinates: 32°49′06″N 96°02′02″W
- Country: United States
- State: Texas
- County: Van Zandt
- Elevation: 538 ft (164 m)
- Time zone: UTC-6 (Central (CST))
  - Summer (DST): UTC-5 (CDT)
- Area codes: 903, 430
- GNIS feature ID: 1377928

Alsa is an unincorporated community in Van Zandt County, Texas, United States. According to the Handbook of Texas, the community had a population of 30 in 2000.

Alsa, a farming community eight miles north of Wills Point in northwestern Van Zandt County, had a post office from 1894 to 1907. According to one source the town was established by Bill Starnes, a Confederate veteran who opened a store shortly after the Civil War and named the settlement for his boyhood sweetheart. Alsa school, established after 1890, joined the Wills Point Independent School District in the early 1950s.
