= First Monday Trade Days =

Flea market in Canton, Texas

Coordinates: 32°33′13″N 95°52′00″W

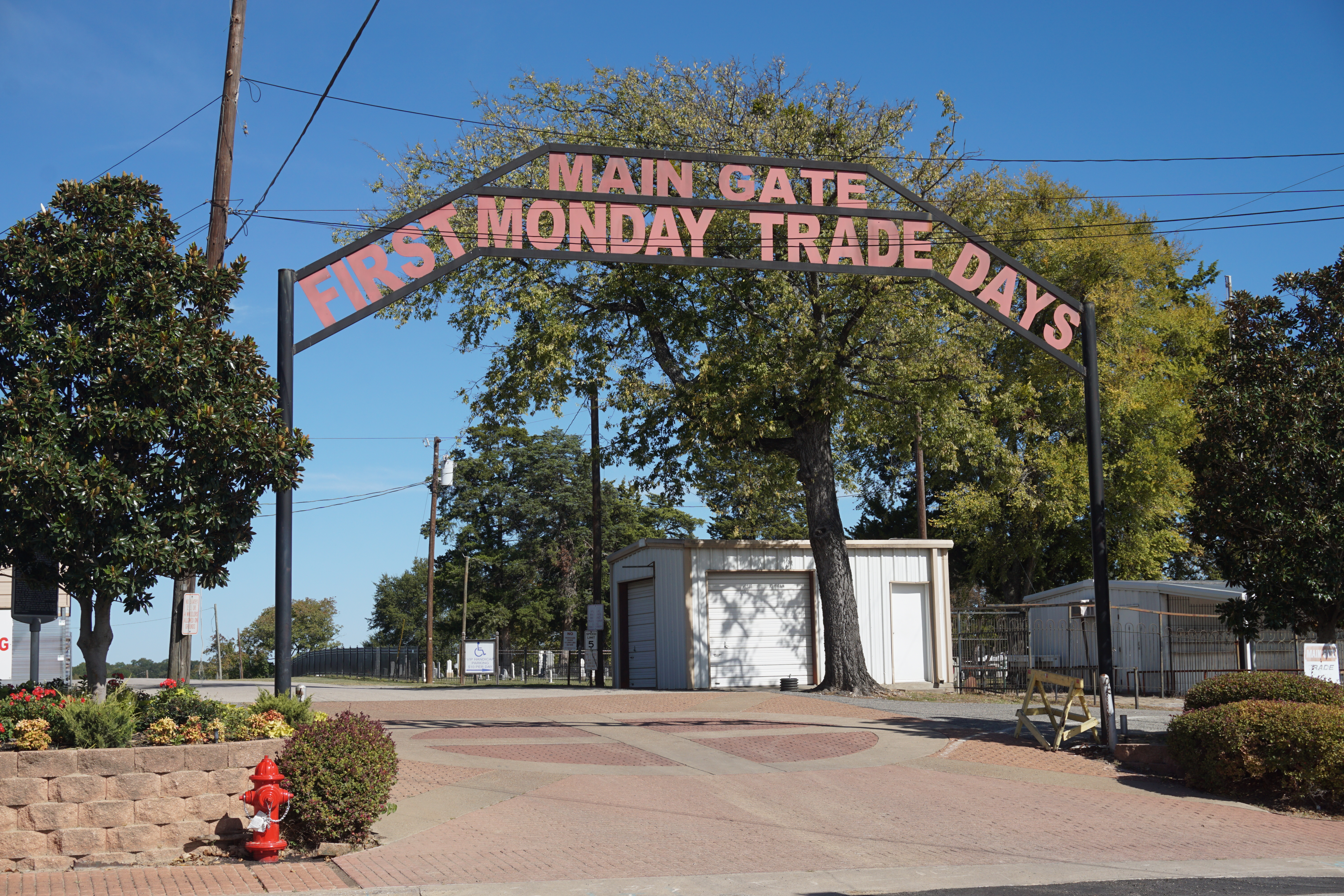
First Monday Trade Days Main Gate

First Monday Trade Days is a monthly flea market held in Canton, Texas. The market is actually held on the Thursday through Sunday preceding the first Monday of each month. It purports to be the largest and oldest continually operated flea market in the United States, and is a highly popular event in the area. Depending on the time of year, up to 100,000 shoppers frequent the fair in a weekend.

== History ==
First Monday Trade Days began sometime in the 1850s. As was common in those days, the circuit judge would stop in certain counties on specific days to hold court sessions. People came to town on those days to see the court proceedings and to conduct business. Canton (the county seat for Van Zandt County) had its designated day on the first Monday of each month, hence the origin of the name. Since most of Van Zandt County was open range at that time, a state law required that all stray horses be brought into Canton and auctioned to the highest bidder. These horses had been picked up on the range and boarded by the farmers until the day of the auction. People came from all around to participate, and this became known as "First Monday Trades Day", sometimes called "Horse Monday". Soon the people were bringing their own horses to sell or trade, and as the years passed, they began to bring their excess crops, such as fresh produce, grain, and sugar cane syrup.

Some dispute those claims and rely on the legend claiming that during middle nineteenth century, this trades day became an important custom to the rural people. With poor means of communication, people would wait until "First Monday" to come to Canton to see their relatives and friends, to make business arrangements, and to get the local news. During the election years, the politicians would center their campaigns around "First Monday". This event would accumulate more people of the county together at one time than any other function of its time. As the years passed and the population of Canton increased, the crowds at "First Monday" increased too—all without any planning or organization—just naturally. The trading area was on the streets. People would stroll up and down, trading, visiting and transacting their business. The townspeople began to look on the event with disdain, dreading the filth and confusion that cluttered their city. They finally passed a city ordinance prohibiting trade in the streets, but to no avail; the law could not be enforced. The crowds were too large for the small city to disperse. The only hope the city had was hopefully the custom would finally "play out" as had most of the other trades days in Texas. This did not come about.

In the 1930s when the importance of the horse began to decline, it was thought that "First Monday" would vanish. There appeared about a ten-year void in Texas between the horse-raising era and the tractor era, and out of state horse traders began to bring in horses to supply this void. Horse buyers from all over the state began to attend "First Monday" and the crowds got larger and larger. It became known statewide as the place to buy a good "bronc".

Then, in the 1940s, as the tractor came in and horses declined, hog trading took its place. Feeder pigs were raised locally, and soon they gained the reputation of being the cleanest and finest pigs sold anywhere --- cholera free. Buyers came in from all over Texas, Oklahoma, and Arkansas to buy these fine pigs.

Dogs were also a commodity. At first, farmers would bring in strays and unwanted offspring; then the hunters started bringing their hound dogs. Soon the whole town was saturated with hound dogs, some selling for as much as $500. "First Monday" now became known all over the Southwest to dog fanciers as "Dog Monday". One could see anything from a Russian Setter to two types of specialized squirrel dogs (one to hunt gray squirrels and one to hunt fox squirrels). After the event, many of the worthless dogs were released, and Canton found itself flooded with stray dogs; it was soon necessary to hire a dog catcher.

By 1950 the crowds were approaching the 5,000 mark, and space became a problem. One homeowner, a woman who owned a double lot, began patrolling her property with a broom to keep the people off. Finally, one trader offered to rent space from her. Then she started renting her entire area. Soon she was making $75 to $100 every "First Monday". Eventually other homeowners did the same. One widow was offered twenty-five cents for the use of her bathroom, and soon this was a big business too. As space became a premium, the traders began to arrive on Sunday in order to get the best space first. This created more serious problems. The churches began to complain about the congestion and activity on the Lord's Day. Sanitation became a big factor. These people had to stay over night in their cars and trucks because there were not adequate facilities in the small town. It was soon apparent that a city police force was needed to control and maintain order among these visitors.

In the early 1960s, a man was bitten by a dog and died of rabies. A city ordinance was passed prohibiting dogs. The townspeople thought this might stop the trades day. It didn't. An individual bought 3 acres (12,000 m^{2}) of land and began to have the dog trade there on his property. The city did require that they all be vaccinated and kept leashed or penned.

The dog trade flourished, and so did the rest of trades day. With the crowds growing larger and people coming in on Sunday, the Mayor and the City Council decided something had to be done. Rules and regulations had to be enacted, a place found, and some kind of order established. Canton had not encouraged "First Monday" --- actually it had discouraged it --- but the custom had become entrenched into the culture of the people for over 100 years, and it looked as though it was there to stay. It had gained national recognition by this time. Feature stories had appeared in Life, Look, and The Saturday Evening Post. Texas newspapers periodically acclaimed its appeal and uniqueness.

In 1965, the City of Canton began a plan of action. The City did not have the funds to move the trading area so Angus Travis, and Joe Hackney partnered and purchased six and a half acres of land north of the square and designated it as a trading area. The City leased the land from H & T Parking and the area was divided into spaces, and each space was rented for a nominal fee, depending upon the type of merchandise offered for sale or trade. This was a new beginning for an old tradition, with a plan for the future. In a short time, this area became filled to overflowing. As more land could be secured by the city, adjoining the original site, it was bought and developed for use. Today, the City of Canton has over 100 acres (0.4 km^{2}), which can accommodate over 3,000 dealers.

Despite numerous and repeated attempts by early city officials to discourage traders from doing business on the streets of the city, First Monday Trade Days continued and flourished. Eventually Canton realized that it could benefit from the popularity of the market, and purchased a site dedicated to it.

== Trade days today ==
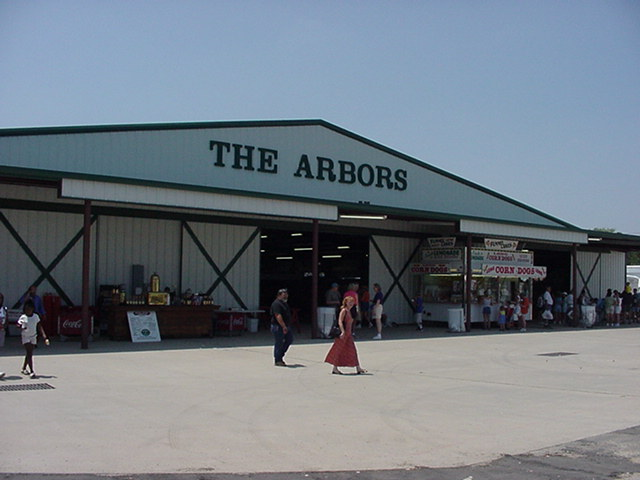
The Arbors building

First Monday Trade Days covers over 100 acres (0.4 km2) and accommodates 6,000 vendors. The Original Pavilion I was constructed by Henry Lewis in 1988 to provide shoppers with a covered area for shopping regardless of weather conditions. Subsequent additions include the Original Pavilion II in 1989, Original Pavilion III, the Porch, and Walkway by the Creek in 1990. The site currently features various designated buildings and areas such as the Lewis Original Pavilions and Walkway By The Creek, Civic Center and Trade Centers (I, II, III, and IV), Canton Marketplace, Old Mill Marketplace, The Village, The Mountain, The Arbors, and The Dog Alley. Adjacent to the First Monday Trade Days facility, there is an area known as ‘the Lewis side’, operated by Henry Lewis, who purchased The Arbors in 2009.

The pavilions serve as spaces for established and regular vendors, who have reserved them for the entire year. These vendors, often referred to as "regulars," offer a wide variety of merchandise, including new items, handcrafted items, and more. Many of these vendors have been setting up at Canton Trade Days for over 20 years.

Located at the beginning of the Trade Days market area on Highway 19, Canton Marketplace is a climate-controlled indoor pavilion housing over 300 vendors, most of whom are year-round regulars. Offering slightly more upscale items than the rest of the grounds, this pavilion includes a food court. Despite its upscale atmosphere, shoppers can still find excellent bargains on unique items. Occasionally, there are concerts or other free events during Trade Days weekends. The restrooms at Canton Marketplace are considered the best on the grounds, and there is a winery offering taste testing. The marketplace provides convenient onsite parking, an RV Park, and free trolley transportation to other First Monday areas. As of Spring 2014, a 10' x 20' or 14' x 14' booth inside one of the main (buildings 2, 3 and 4) costs approx $200 per weekend (Wednesday afternoon/Thursday morning setup to end-of-show Sunday).

The unreserved areas of the market are particularly intriguing, often yielding unexpected treasures. It's a first-come-first-served setup in these sections, with vendors arriving early to secure choice shady spots. These areas have a garage sale vibe but with a focus on collectibles. While the majority of items are old, there are bargains to be found in current categories like computer and office supplies, tools, yard art, furniture, and toys. These sections are a treasure trove of surprises, and valuable items can still be discovered. However, finding such gems has become somewhat more challenging due to the rise of online platforms like eBay and the increased knowledge of collectors and sellers.

Despite the large size of the facility, people with disabilities can still access the event by renting scooters to get around the market area. However, extremely hot weather may affect patrons' ability.

Because of the income the city receives from operating the facility, until 2006 a city property tax was not required from Canton's residents.

Many residents have also turned struggling farms into support businesses. One such farm located across the main highway turned its land into parking spaces. They now make more from charging drivers to park on their lot for the 4 days of the event than they ever did from farming the same land. By the way, parking as of early 2007 is $5/car almost everywhere. No free parking on city streets is available.

Incidents

On three separate occasions, a tornado has hit the Canton area on days just before First Monday Trade Days: May 2, 2008, April 29, 2017, and May 29, 2019.

In March 2020, for the first time in Trade Days history the Trade Days were canceled for the upcoming April Trade Days, due to the 2019-20 coronavirus pandemic.

== Notoriety ==
Featured in the PBS documentary A Flea Market Documentary produced by WQED, Pittsburgh, Pennsylvania.
