= Edgewood, Texas =

- City
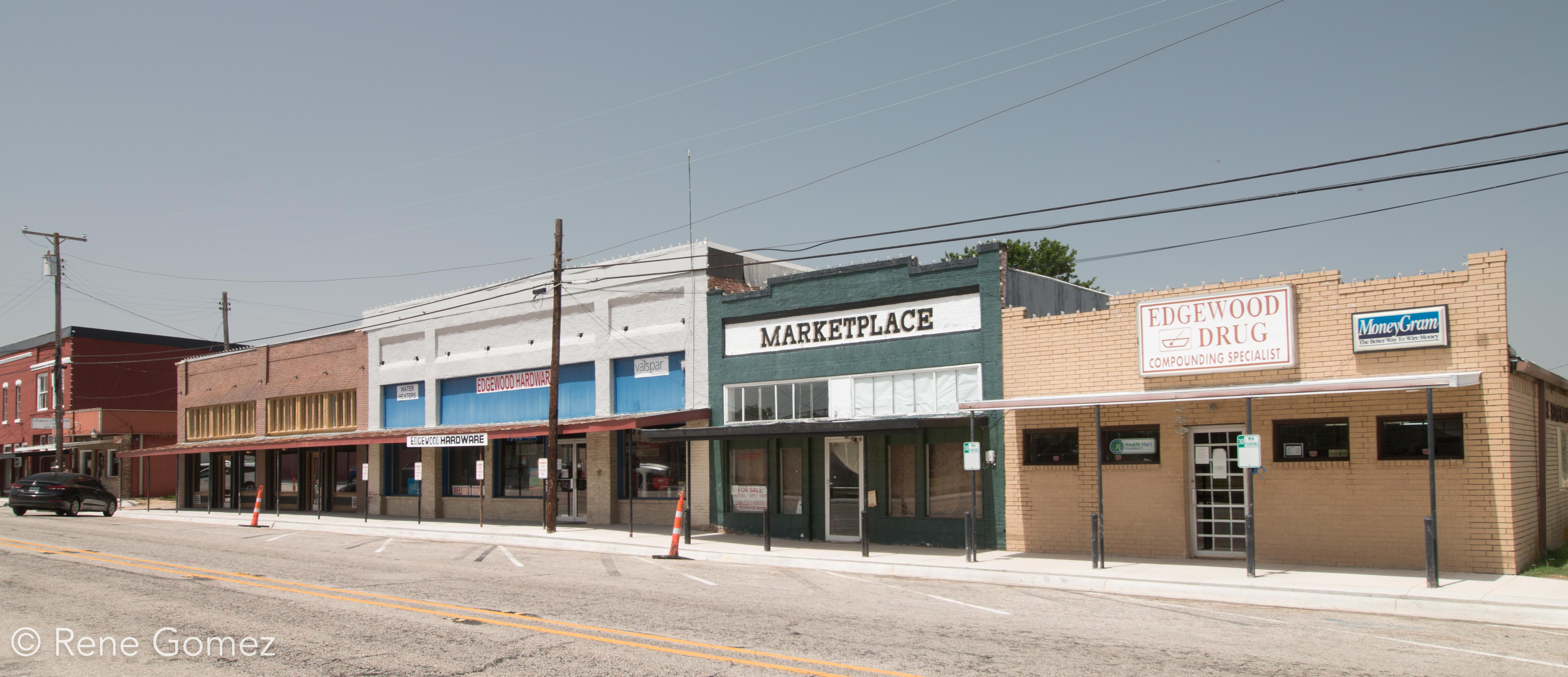
- Downtown Edgewood

- Location of Edgewood, Texas
- Coordinates: 32°41′35″N 95°52′46″W
- Country: United States
- State: Texas
- County: Van Zandt

Area
  - Total: 1.37 sq mi (3.56 km^{2})
  - Land: 1.36 sq mi (3.52 km^{2})
  - Water: 0.019 sq mi (0.05 km^{2})
- Elevation: 476 ft (145 m)

Population (2020)
  - Total: 1,530
  - Density: 1,130/sq mi (435/km^{2})
- Time zone: UTC-6 (Central (CST))
  - Summer (DST): UTC-5 (CDT)
- ZIP code: 75117
- Area codes: 430, 903
- FIPS code: 48-22612
- GNIS feature ID: 2412468
- Website: edgewoodtexas.org

Edgewood is a city in Van Zandt County, Texas, United States. The population was 1,530 at the 2020 census. The town draws its name from its location on the far western edge of the East Texas timberline on U.S. Highway 80, approximately 60 miles east of Dallas.

== Geography ==
According to the United States Census Bureau, the town has a total area of 1.4 square miles (3.5 km^{2}), all of it land.

== Demographics ==
Historical population
Census	Pop.	Note	%±
1880	83		—
1920	820		—
1930	761		−7.2%
1940	738		−3.0%
1950	834		13.0%
1960	887		6.4%
1970	1,176		32.6%
1980	1,413		20.2%
1990	1,284		−9.1%
2000	1,348		5.0%
2010	1,441		6.9%
2020	1,530		6.2%
U.S. Decennial Census

Edgewood racial composition as of 2020 (NH = Non-Hispanic) (Note: Note: the US Census treats Hispanic/Latino as an ethnic category. This table excludes Latinos from the racial categories and assigns them to a separate category. Hispanics/Latinos can be of any race.)
Race	Number	Percentage
White (NH)	1,162	75.95%
Black or African American (NH)	109	7.12%
Native American or Alaska Native (NH)	13	0.85%
Asian (NH)	7	0.46%
Pacific Islander (NH)	1	0.07%
Some other race (NH)	3	0.2%
Mixed/multi-racial (NH)	51	3.33%
Hispanic or Latino	184	12.03%
Total	1,530	

As of the 2020 United States census, there were 1,530 people, 558 households, and 439 families residing in the town.

== Politics ==
The city of Edgewood is a Republican stronghold, like the rest of Van Zandt County. The city of Edgewood's limits are coterminous with Van Zandt County voter precinct 1E.

Edgewood city vote by party in presidential elections
Year	Democratic	Republican	Third parties
2020	20.00% 121	79.17% 479	0.83% 5
2016	20.37% 109	77.38% 414	2.24% 12
2012	25.55% 139	73.35% 399	1.10% 6

== Education ==
The Town of Edgewood is served by the Edgewood Independent School District.

== Notable people ==
- Cameron McCasland, Emmy-nominated film and television producer
- Chad Morris, college football coach

== Newspapers and publications ==
- Edgewood Enterprise
- Van Zandt County News
