= Edgewood Independent School District (Van Zandt County, Texas) =

School district in Texas

Coordinates: 32.6984°N 95.8860°W

Location
- Edgewood, Texas United States

District information
- Type: Public School
- Grades: PK-12
- Superintendent: Kristin Prater

Students and staff
- Athletic conference: UIL Class 3A
- District mascot: Bulldogs
- Colors: Purple and Gold

Edgewood Independent School District is a public school district based in Edgewood, Texas, United States.

For the 2022–23 school year, the district was rated by the Texas Education Agency as follows: 84 (B) overall, 84 (B) for Student Achievement, 82 (B) for School Progress, and 83 (B) for Closing the Gaps.

== School information ==
- Colors: Purple, Gold and White
- Mascot: The Bulldog
- Yearbook title: The Kennel
- Football stadium: I. T. James Memorial Stadium

== Campus ==
There are four schools in Edgewood ISD, all located on one campus at 804 East Pine Street in Edgewood.

- Edgewood High School (grades 9-12)
- Edgewood Middle School (grades 6-8)
- Edgewood Intermediate School (grades 3-5)
- Edgewood Elementary School (grades PK-2)
