= Grand Saline Independent School District =

School district in Texas

Coordinates: 32.6842°N 95.7124°W

Address
- 400 Stadium Dr. Grand Saline, Van Zandt County, Texas, 75140-1038; United States

District information
- Type: Public
- Motto: "Changing the World, One Student at a Time"
- Grades: Pre-Kindergarten–12
- Superintendent: Micah Lewis

Students and staff
- Enrollment: Approximately 1,111 students (2013)
- District mascot: Indians/Lady Indians
- Colors: Black & Orange

Other information
- Website: www.grandsalineisd.net

Grand Saline Independent School District is a public school district based in Grand Saline, Texas, United States. The district encompasses roughly all of northeastern Van Zandt County and has a very small portion in extreme northwestern Smith County in East Texas . The district operates four campuses in five buildings and also has various other buildings on former school district property. For the 2022–23 school year, the district was rated by the Texas Education Agency as: 75 (C) overall, 77 (C) for Student Achievement, 76 (C) for School Progress, and 71 (C) for Closing the Gaps.

== Administration ==
- Superintendent - Mr. Micah Lewis
- Assistant Superintendent - Mr. Ricky LaPrade
- High School Principal - Mr. Jim Lamb
- Middle School Principal - Mr. Michael Mize
- Intermediate School Principal - Mrs. Tina Core
- Elementary School Principal - Mrs. Laurie Hooten
- Director of Athletics - Coach Joe Drennon
- Board of Education -
  - Mr. Micah Lowe, President
  - Mr. Phillip "Bear" Brown, Vice President
  - Mr. Kyle Thompson, Secretary
  - Mr. Matt Strickland, Member
  - Mr. Dustin Mason, Member
  - Mr. Nick Haley, Member
  - Mr. Michael Martin, Member

== School District History ==
Grand Saline's first school was started in 1849, as Grand Saline School, with a total population of 378 students on Saline Creek, a Sabine River tributary. Around 1920, all of the local communities consolidated to form Grand Saline Independent School District, and the first school opened around 1920 and moved into the city itself at the corner of High and Green Streets. Shortly thereafter, the first brick gymnasium in Van Zandt County was built on the same plot of land as the high school. In the 1940s, as the population of the school began to expand due Grand Saline's economic development, the school district built an elementary school for students in grades 1-6 on the opposite side of the city on Oleander Street and also built the district's first football stadium, Person's Stadium, in honor of A.E. Persons, a wealthy citizen who was an oilman and contributed financially to the district and town. In 1962, Grand Saline's Board of Education and the citizens approved the construction of a new high school, new gymnasium, and additions to Person's Stadium. The new high school was finished in 1965. The city of Grand Saline constructed Stadium Drive, which was built for access to the new high school. A separate middle school building for grades 7–8 was built in 1980 next door to the high school, and across the street, a weight training facility, track and field set-up, and fieldhouse were built. Renovations did not occur again until 1993, when district voters approved a bond issue that built a cafetorium and added a student commons area in the high school, which would connect the gymnasium and the classroom wings and create one building. Additionally, voters approved the construction of Indian Memorial Stadium, a new football stadium with an Olympic-quality track and field facility and a seating capacity of 4,500 fans, replacing the old Person's Stadium, which became a practice field. In 1996, the district constructed a brand new intermediate school to house grades 4-6. In late 1999, due to a steady growth in the district, officials proposed the idea of building a new, $7 million, state-of-the-art high school next to the current facility. In the spring of 2000, voters approved the bond issue, and construction began in summer of 2002; the school opened for classes in the fall of 2004, with the capacity for 550 students. In addition to much bigger classrooms, the new school has a gymnasium with three basketball courts and seating for 1,200 fans, a new baseball field directly behind the new high school, and a new fine arts auditorium. In 2011, Grand Saline replaced the oldest campus, the elementary school, built directly on the former Person's Stadium and directly across the street from the other three campuses. The same year, the district opened a softball complex, replacing the former softball field that was behind the old elementary school.

In March 2022, the district began permitting employees to have weapons if they are concealed.

== District schools and facilities ==
The district currently operates four schools in five buildings, with a total district enrollment of roughly 1,200 students.

| School | Address | Grades | Enrollment | Notes |
|---|---|---|---|---|
| Grand Saline High School | 500 Stadium Drive | 9–12 | 350 | New building opened in fall 2004 |
| Grand Saline Middle School | 400 Stadium Drive | 7–8 | 190 | |
| Grand Saline Intermediate School | 200 Stadium Drive | 4–6 | 250 | |
| Grand Saline Elementary School | 450 Stadium Drive | Prekindergarten-grade 3 | 410 | Distinguished Elementary School, new building opened in 2011 |

In addition to the campuses, GSISD also owns and operates various facilities for athletic and community purposes. The district still owns the original plot of land where the first in-city school was built. The land has the first school replica and the first gymnasium ever built by the district. Both are still used by the community. The old school was a project of the community group Friends of the Old School. The group was dealt a terrible setback in 2009 when a fire almost destroyed the school, but it was rebuilt due to generous donations by the community members.

=== Other facilities ===
Indian Memorial Stadium, the football stadium for the middle school and high school football teams and track and field teams, was built in 1994; it seats 4,500 fans at capacity and is one of the top 3A and under grass stadiums in East Texas.

Shirely F. Anderson Tennis Complex, built in honor of the former Grand Saline and Texas Christian University football and tennis standout and graduate, is currently under renovation.

Indian Baseball Diamond, constructed in 2003, is the home field for Grand Saline High School baseball, one of the premier East Texas programs; it also hosts the I-20 classic, along with nearby Van and Canton High Schools.

Lady Indian Softball Facility, built in 2012, is a venue for Grand Saline Lady Indian softball.

The old elementary school is still used, as well, for Head Start and other primary school-aged activities despite its age. The current middle school (which is the former high school) is under renovation to correct issues with the aging of the building.

The Grand Saline High School Theater contains a full-sized proscenium stage, technical work room, tool room, costume storage, prop storage loft, and two dressing rooms. The multilevel cafeteria seating holds 500.

== Recognition ==
As of the 2013 school year, Grand Saline ISD was awarded the highest possible rating by the Texas Education Agency's new ranking system, at "met standards" on the "core four" categories of Student Achievement, Student Progress, Closing Performance Gaps, and College or Post-secondary Readiness. State target percentages for school districts in Texas to for "met standards" for the categories are, respectively, 50, 21, 55, and 75. GSISD surpassed them all with numbers of 77, 34, 75, and 83, giving the district its best ranking since the 2005–06 school year.

Traditionally, Grand Saline has been between "academically recognized" and "exemplary" according to former TEA TAKS/TAAS standards. The district dipped to a low of "acceptable" during the 2007–08 school year, but rebounded to "recognized" in 2009–10.

Grand Saline High School and Grand Saline Middle School both were Exemplary Texas Schools from 1998 to 2004.
