= Canton Independent School District =

School district in Texas, United States

Location
- Canton, TX ESC Region 10 USA

District information
- Type: Public
- Grades: Pre-K through 12
- Superintendent: Dr. Brian Nichols

Students and staff
- Students: 1,904
- Teachers: 132
- Staff: 116
- Athletic conference: UIL Class 4A
- Colors: Green & White

Other information
- Mascot: Eagle
- Website: www.cantonisd.net

Canton Independent School District is a public school district based in Canton, Texas (USA).

== Schools ==
There are four campuses in Canton ISD -

- Canton High School (Grades 9-12)
- Canton Jr. High School (Grades 6-8)
- Canton Intermediate School (Grades 3-5)
- Canton Elementary School (Grades PK-2)

For the 2022–23 school year, the district was rated by the Texas Education Agency as follows: 86 (B) overall, 87 (B) for Student Achievement, 85 (B) for School Progress, and 85 (B) for Closing the Gaps.

== Statistics (per 2006) ==
The attendance rate for students in the district is 97%, compared with a state average of 96%. 32% of the students in the district are economically disadvantaged, 10% enroll in special education, 5% enroll in gifted and talent programs, 22% are enrolled in career and technology programs, and 3% are considered "limited English proficient."

The ethnic makeup of the district is 87% White, non-Hispanic, 8% Hispanic, 3% African American, 1% Asian/Pacific Islander, and 1% Native American.

Teachers in the district carry, on average, 15 years of teaching experience and 4% of the teachers on staff are first-year teachers. 83% of the teachers hold bachelors, 16% hold master's, and less than 1% hold doctorates.

72% of students in the district took SAT/ACT standardized examinations with an average score of 1026 and 21, respectively. 20% of students took an AP and/or IB examination.

== See also ==
- List of school districts in Texas
- Canton, TX
