= Canton, Texas =

- City
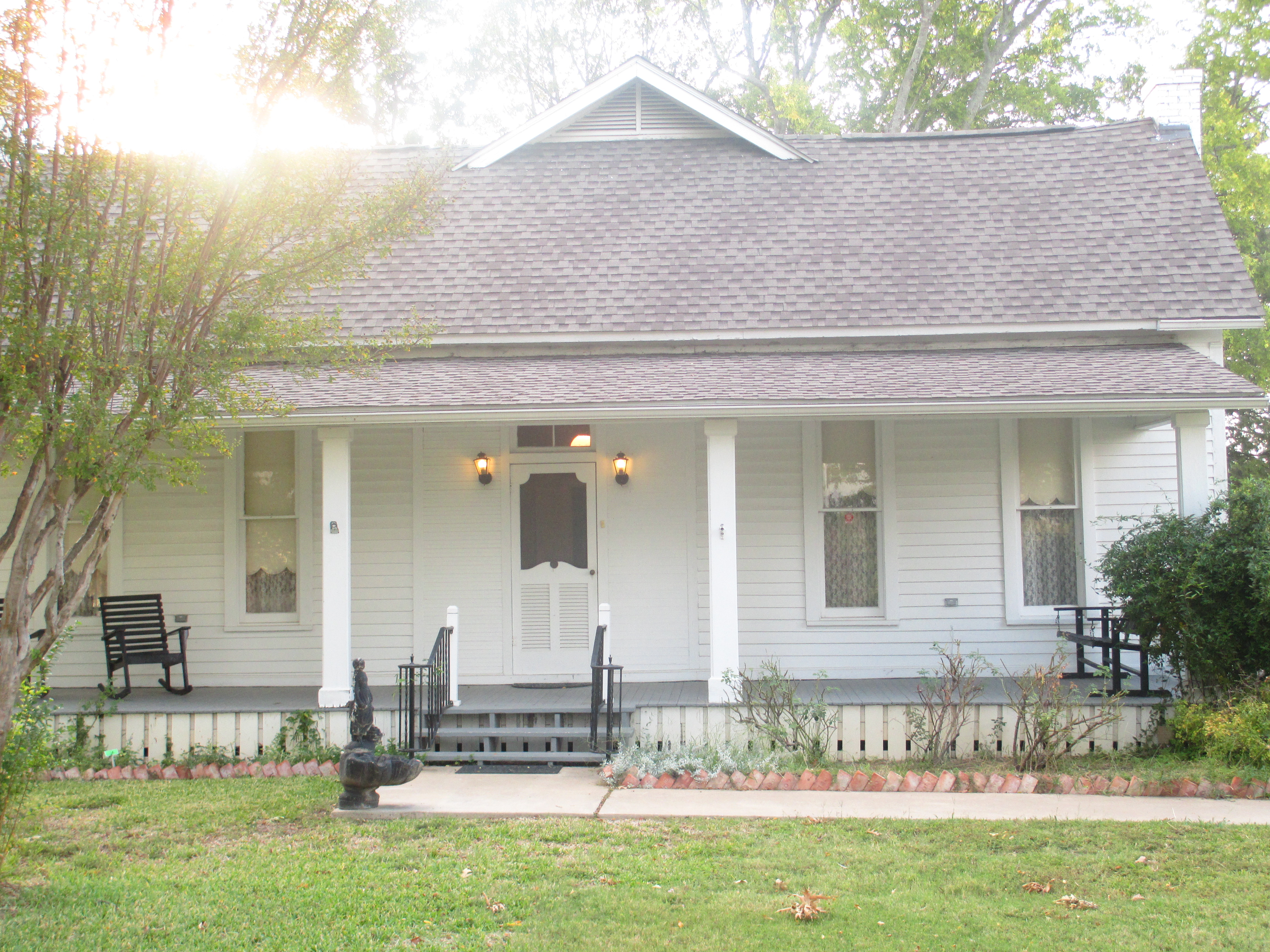
- The Blackwell House Museum in Canton was built in 1886, but occupied as a residence until 1975.

- Location of Canton, Texas
- Coordinates: 32°33′23″N 95°52′20″W
- Country: United States
- State: Texas
- County: Van Zandt

Area
  - Total: 6.51 sq mi (16.87 km^{2})
  - Land: 6.05 sq mi (15.66 km^{2})
  - Water: 0.47 sq mi (1.21 km^{2})
- Elevation: 502 ft (153 m)

Population (2024)
  - Total: 4,229
  - Density: 638.7/sq mi (246.59/km^{2})
- Time zone: UTC-6 (Central (CST))
  - Summer (DST): UTC-5 (CDT)
- ZIP code: 75103
- Area codes: 903, 430
- FIPS code: 48-12496
- GNIS feature ID: 2409977
- Website: www.cantontx.gov/index.php

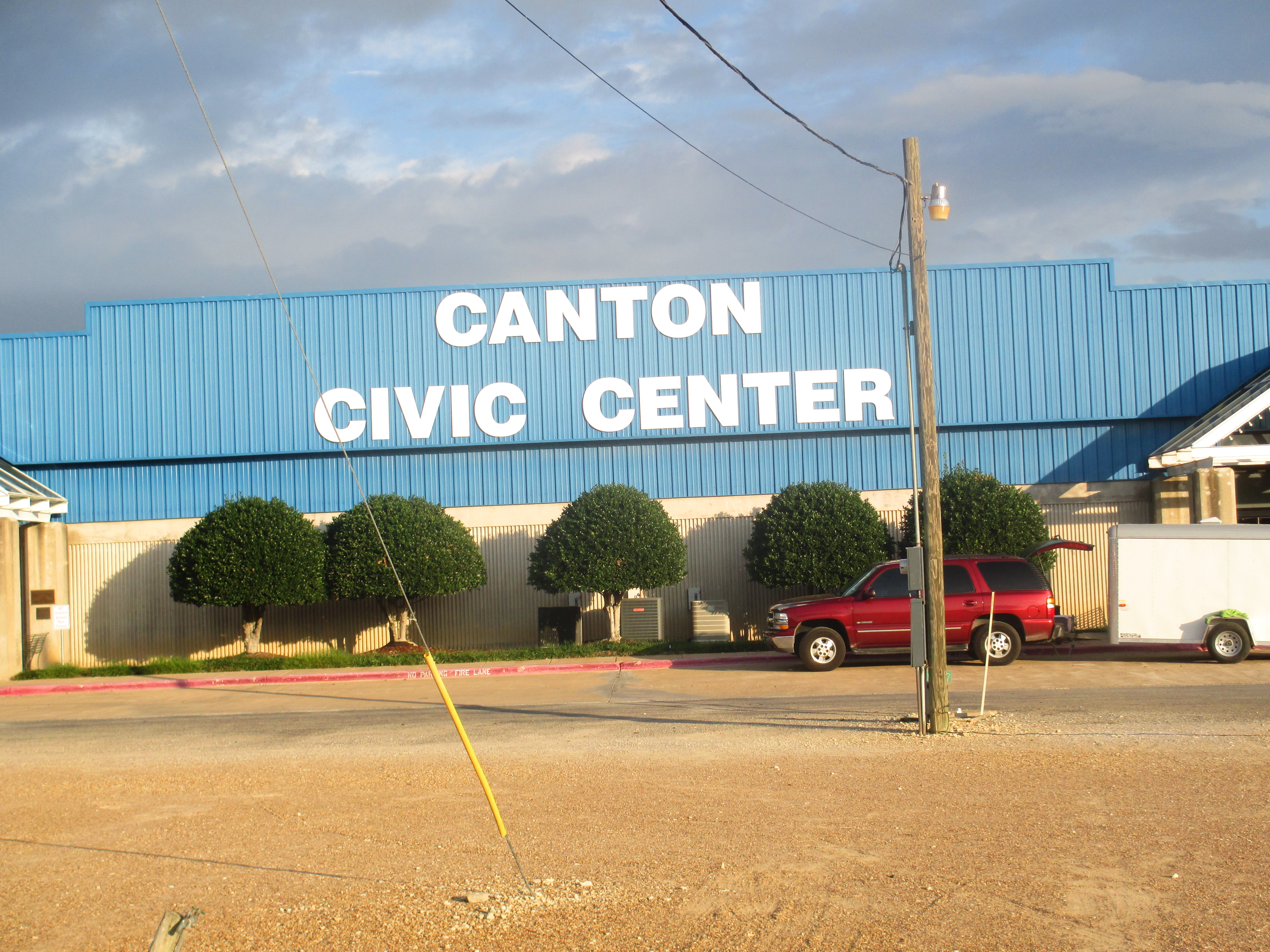
Canton Civic Center at 800 Flea Market Road hosts the First Monday Trade Days.

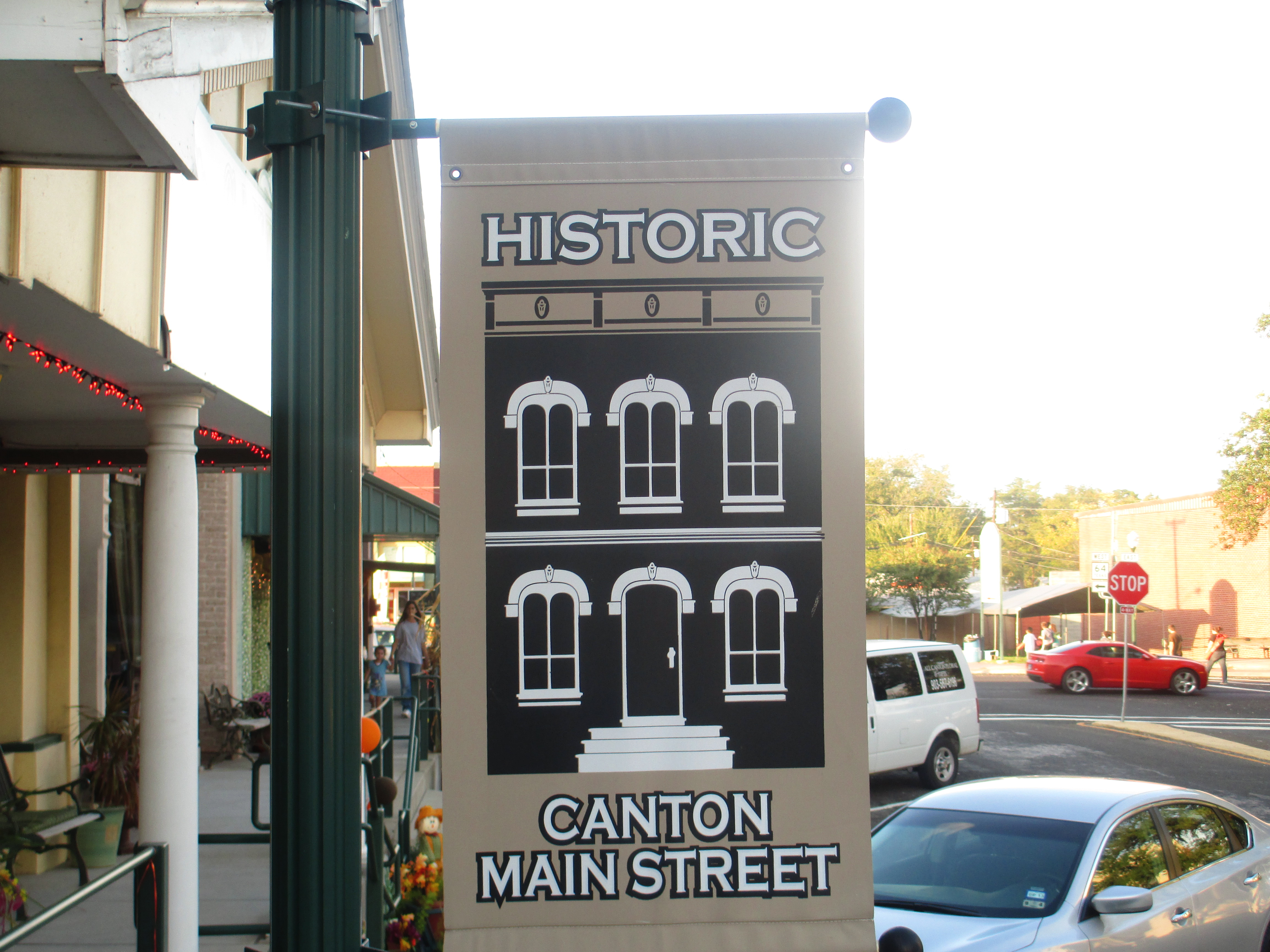
Historic Canton Main Street banner

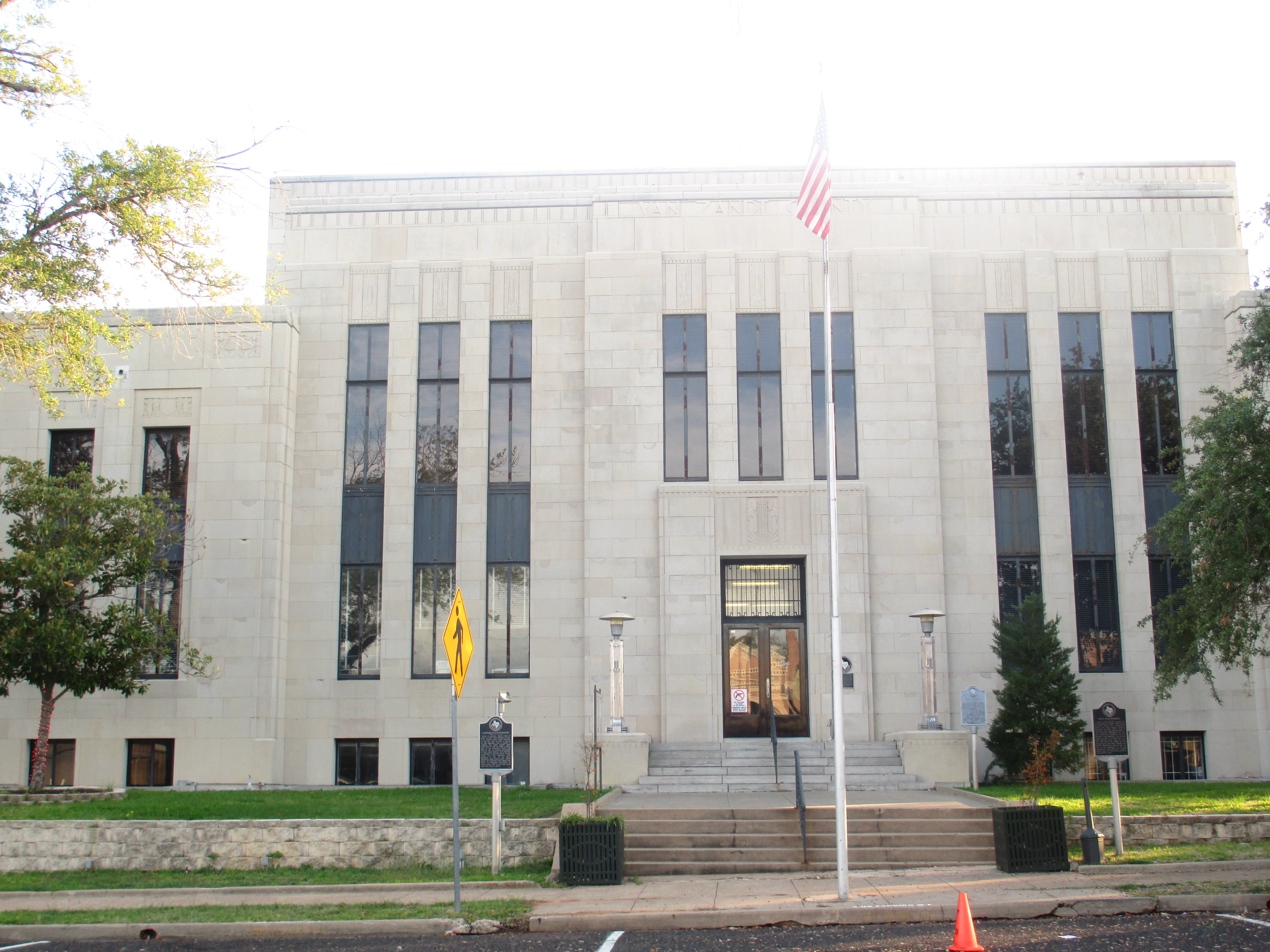
Canton is the location of the Van Zandt County courthouse.

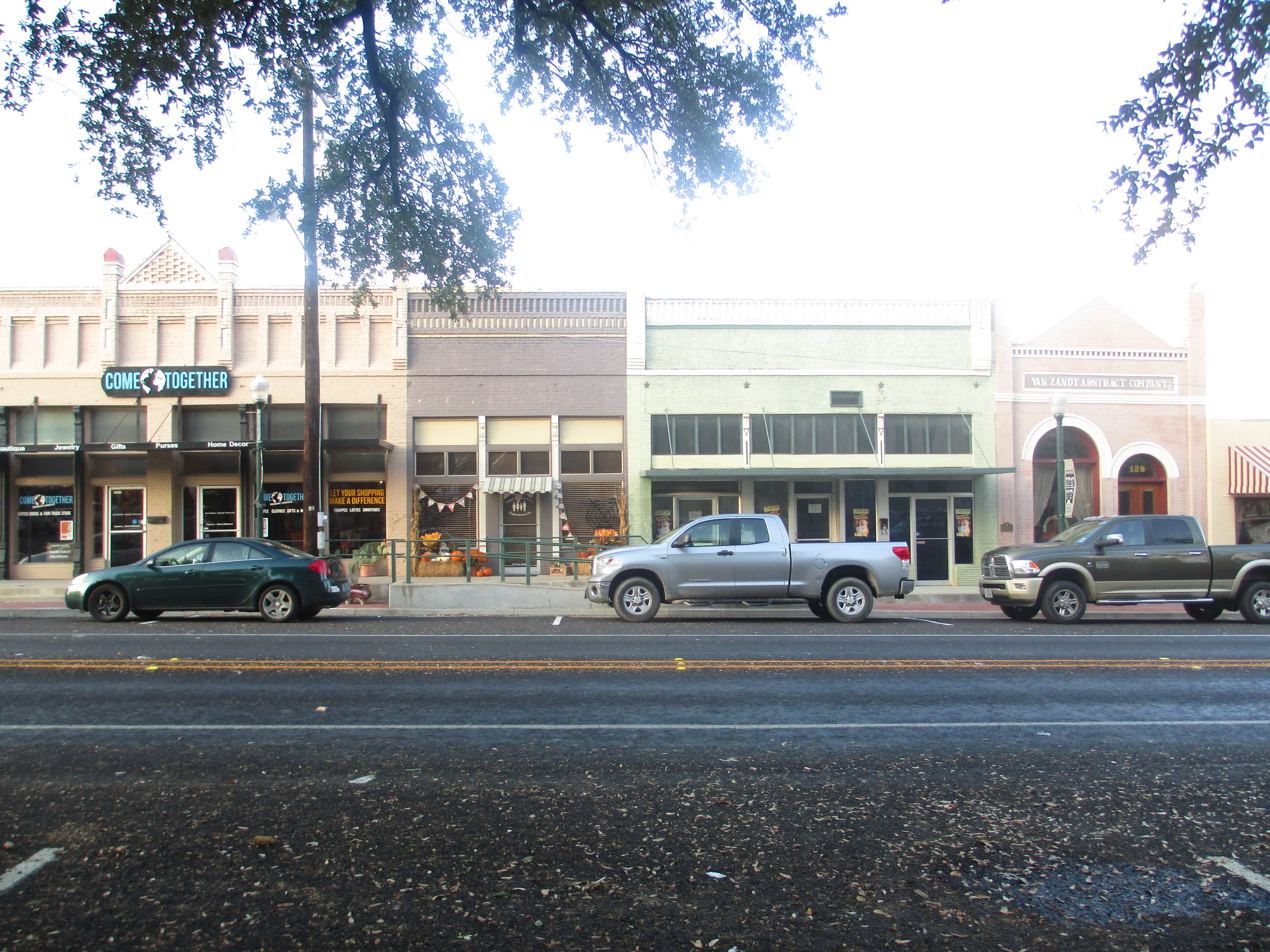
A glimpse of Canton across the street from the courthouse

Canton is a city in and the county seat of Van Zandt County in East Texas, United States. It is located about 40 miles west of Tyler. As of the 2020 census, the city had a population of 4,229.

The city sustained severe damage on April 29, 2017, from several tornadoes, and two years later from another tornado that struck downtown on May 29, 2019, both of which occurred just before First Monday Trade Days, the popular flea market which draws thousands to the city each month.

== History ==
Canton was surveyed as early as 1840 by a company of men under Dr. W. P. King. The community stands on the original survey of Jesse Stockwell, an early settler in the area. No settlement was made until 1850, when the town was laid out and named by settlers moving from Old Canton in Smith County, Texas. The first district courthouse at Canton opened in 1850, and a post office, the county's fourth, was established in that year.

When the Texas and Pacific Railway was built across the county in 1872, it missed Canton by 10 miles (16 km), and the citizens of Wills Point persuaded county officials to move the county seat there. In the resulting dispute in 1877, armed residents of Canton went to Wills Point to recover the records, and the county judge wired Governor Richard B. Hubbard for aid. The Texas Supreme Court finally decided in favor of Canton. Unwilling to use the railroad at Wills Point, Canton businessmen established Edgewood, 10 mi (16 km) to the northwest of town, and built an extension to the railroad at a siding formerly called Stevenson.

Property for the town's first school, the Canton Academy, was acquired in 1853. Sid S. Johnson began publication of the Canton Weekly Times, the county's first newspaper, in 1860. A Grange was founded in 1876. By 1890, Canton had a population of 421, flour mills, sawmills, cotton gins, and a bank. Brick buildings were under construction by 1892, and a new brick courthouse was completed in 1894. Iron ore and anthracite coal were discovered in 1887 and 1891. By 1896, the town reached a population high of 800 and had several churches, a steam gristmill and gin, two weekly newspapers, three general stores, and two hotels, but the population had fallen back to 421 by 1904.

Canton was incorporated in 1919, and elected a mayor and aldermen. Despite the Great Depression, development of the Van oilfield after 1929 brought further expansion. A Public Works Administration project in the 1930s had the completion of a new courthouse. In 1933, area schools registered 500 white and 28 black students. The population reached 715 in 1940, but dwindled again after 1949. In the 1950s, local business included a sweet-potato curing plant, an ice factory, a concrete-tile factory, lumberyards, and a cotton gin. Expansion of the Canton city limits doubled its territory in the 1960s. In 1970, the community had a municipal lake with recreational facilities, seven churches, a school, a bank, a library, a newspaper, and 86 businesses. The population doubled between 1960 and 1970 from roughly 1,000 to 2,000, and reached nearly 3,000 by 1990. The population was 3,292 in 2000. However, when the city council decided to recount the population, they found that the town had 5,100 residents instead of the previous census total of 3,292.

Canton is known for its First Monday Trade Days. According to various sources, the tradition began with district court meetings held on the first Monday of each month, or with the monthly visit of neighbors during the days of the Confederate States of America. The custom began with the swapping of surplus stock by barter and grew to include casual bargaining for or swapping of dogs, antiques, junk, and donkeys on a 30-acre (120,000 m^{2}) grounds. It is so popular that Canton goes from a town of 5,100 to a town of over 30,000 during each First Monday weekend, making it the largest flea market in the world. In the past, due to the success of First Monday, the city of Canton had no property tax. However, as of 2006, that is no longer the case.

Canton also holds the Van Zandt County Fair and Rodeo and an Annual Bluegrass Festival, which takes place in August. Between 2003 and 2007, Canton was the host community for the United States Equestrian Drill Championship (Super Ride), which showcases top color guard and mounted drill teams from throughout the country.

On April 29, 2017, the city and county sustained severe damage from four tornadoes. One of these tornadoes was rated EF4, making it one of the two strongest tornadoes of the year. Reports of four fatalities and dozens of injured prompted opening of displacement shelters as a disaster declaration was made for Van Zandt County. Texas Governor Greg Abbott ordered state resources to the area to offer assistance to local officials.

On May 29, 2019, the city and county sustained extensive damage from a tornado that struck the downtown area, near First Monday Trade Days. No deaths or injuries occurred, but several houses and local businesses were severely damaged or destroyed. The tornado struck the intersection of Texas State Highways 19 and 64.

== Geography ==
According to the United States Census Bureau, the city has a total area of 5.6 square miles (14.6 km^{2}), of which 5.2 square miles (13.4 km^{2}) are land and 0.4 square mile (1.1 km^{2}) is water (7.80%).

== Transportation ==
Canton was previously served by the Canton-Hackney Airport, The airport appears to have closed in 2022.

== Demographics ==
Historical population
Census	Pop.	Note	%±
1870	183		—
1880	331		80.9%
1890	421		27.2%
1920	583		—
1930	704		20.8%
1940	715		1.6%
1950	881		23.2%
1960	1,114		26.4%
1970	2,283		104.9%
1980	2,845		24.6%
1990	2,949		3.7%
2000	3,292		11.6%
2010	3,581		8.8%
2020	4,229		18.1%
U.S. Decennial Census

=== 2020 census ===
As of the 2020 census, Canton had a population of 4,229, 1,593 households, and 922 families residing in the city. The median age was 38.5 years; 24.9% of residents were under the age of 18 and 20.7% were 65 years of age or older. For every 100 females there were 91.8 males, and for every 100 females age 18 and over there were 88.3 males age 18 and over.

There were 1,593 households in Canton, of which 35.1% had children under the age of 18 living in them. Of all households, 44.9% were married-couple households, 15.3% were households with a male householder and no spouse or partner present, and 33.8% were households with a female householder and no spouse or partner present. About 30.5% of all households were made up of individuals and 17.6% had someone living alone who was 65 years of age or older.

There were 1,718 housing units, of which 7.3% were vacant. Among occupied housing units, 55.4% were owner-occupied and 44.6% were renter-occupied. The homeowner vacancy rate was 1.4% and the rental vacancy rate was 4.7%.

0% of residents lived in urban areas, while 100.0% lived in rural areas.

Racial composition as of the 2020 census
Race	Percent
White	86.0%
Black or African American	3.1%
American Indian and Alaska Native	0.8%
Asian	1.3%
Native Hawaiian and Other Pacific Islander	0.1%
Some other race	1.7%
Two or more races	7.1%
Hispanic or Latino (of any race)	9.4%

== Notable people ==
- Colten Brewer, professional baseball player
- Calvin Graham was the youngest U.S. serviceman in WWII enlisting at the age of 12.
- James S. Hogg, district attorney in Van Zandt County, was elected governor in 1890
- Jerry Hunt, composer, established IRIDA Records there in 1979
- G. J. Kinne, professional football coach and former player
- Keavon Milton, former professional football player
- Deion Sanders, coach of the Colorado Buffaloes football and former professional football player.

== Popular culture ==
On July 21, 2008, Stephen Colbert made a comment on The Colbert Report about John McCain making a campaign stop in Canton, Ohio, and "not the crappy Canton in Georgia." The comment resulted in a local uproar, which prompted Colbert to apologize for the story during his July 30, 2008, show.
