= Tornadoes of 2022 =

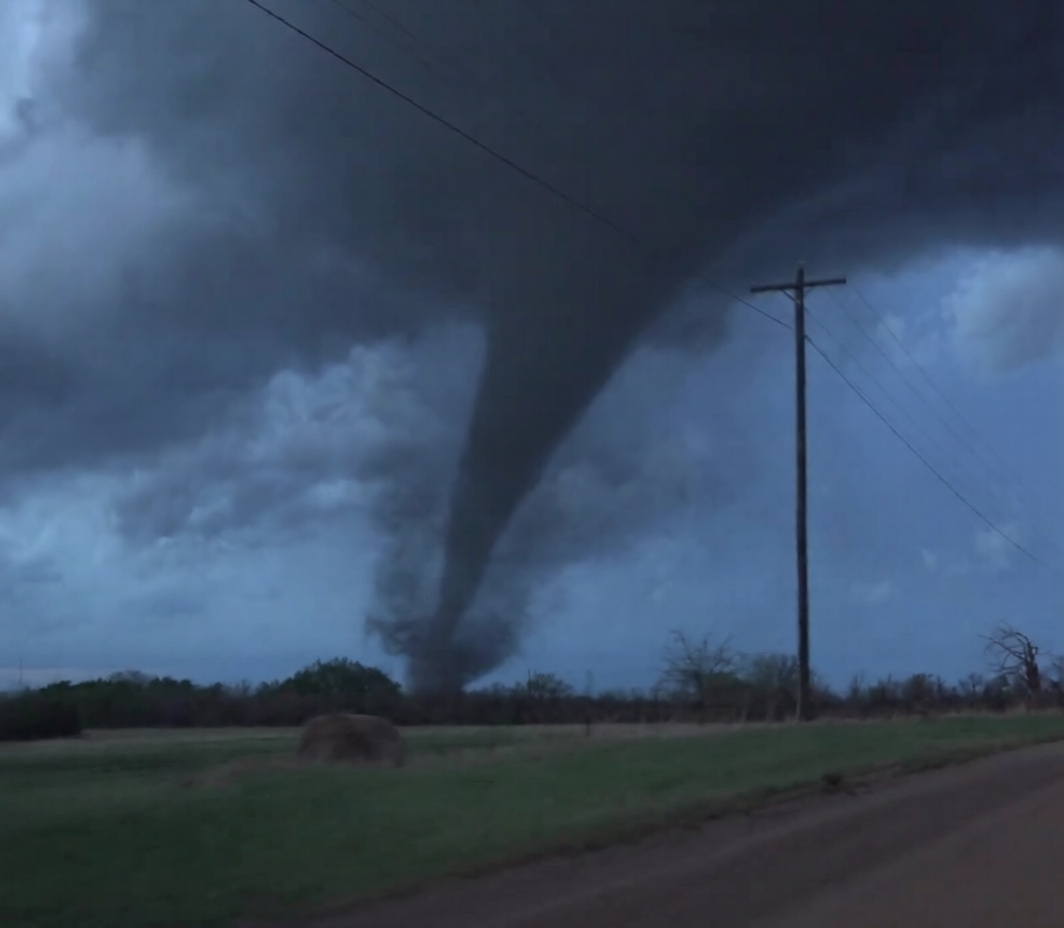
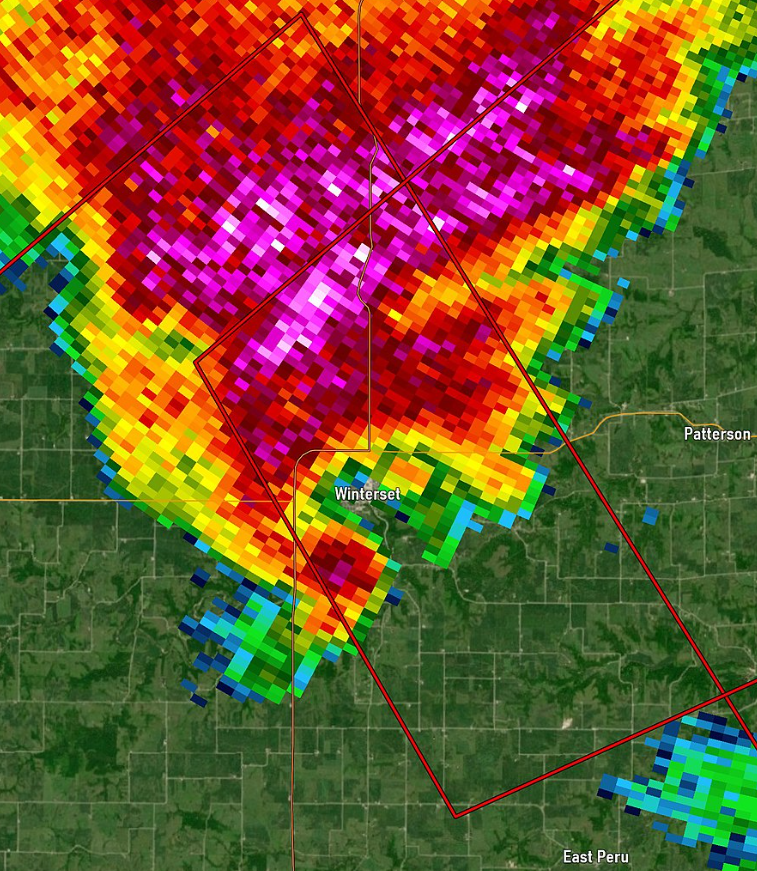
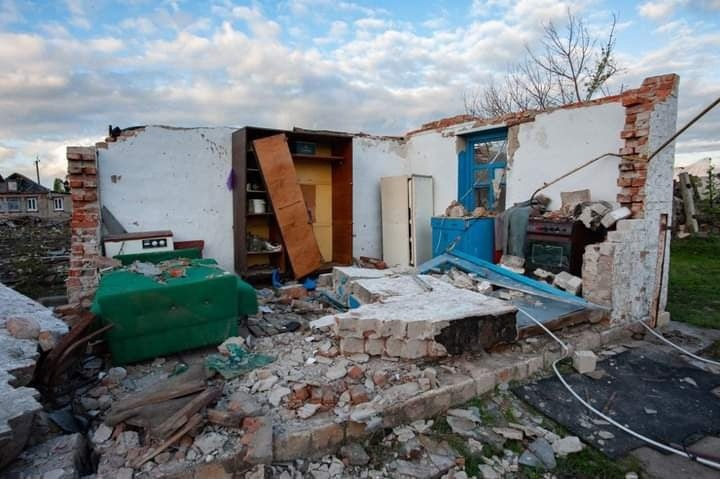
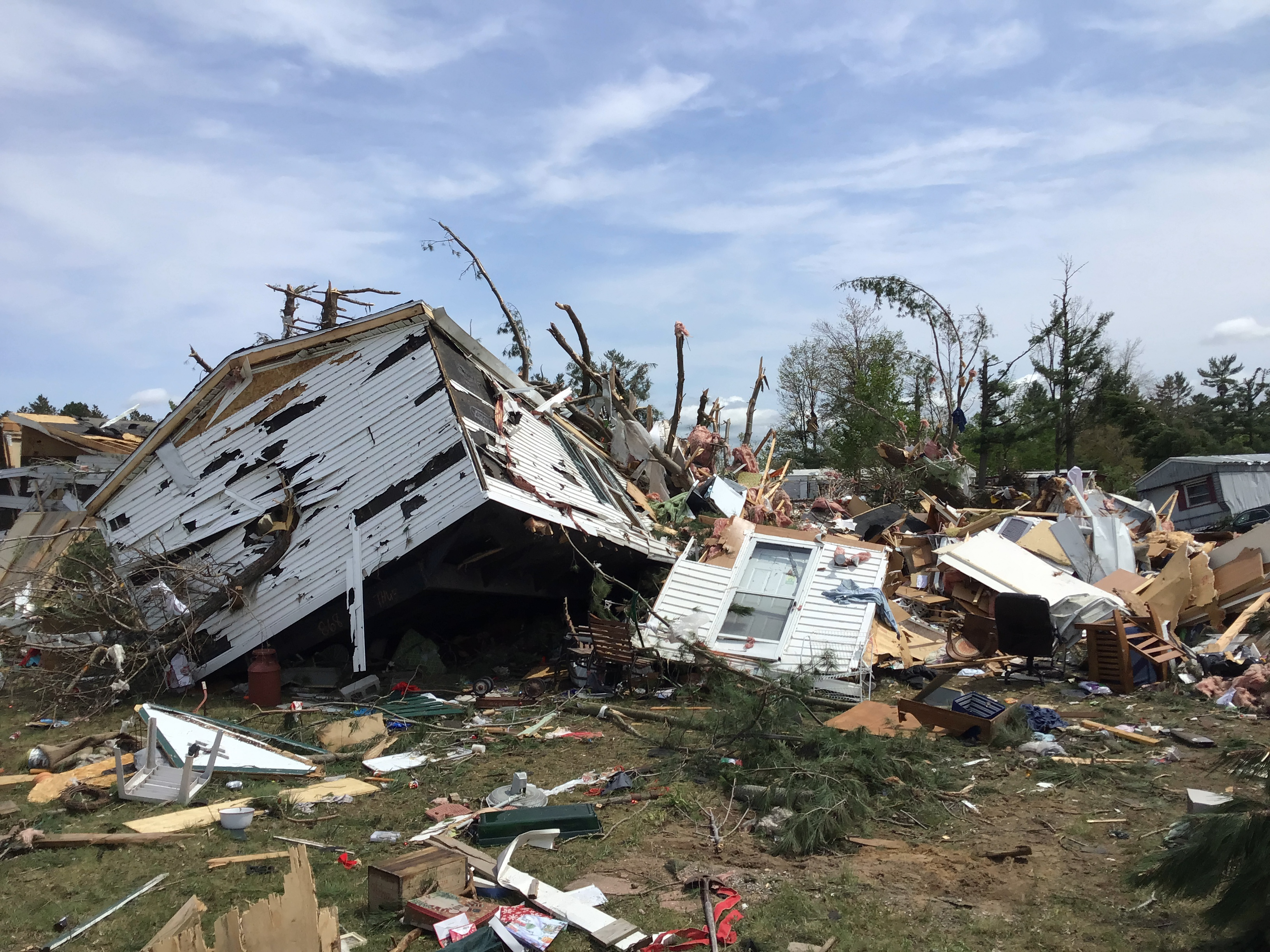
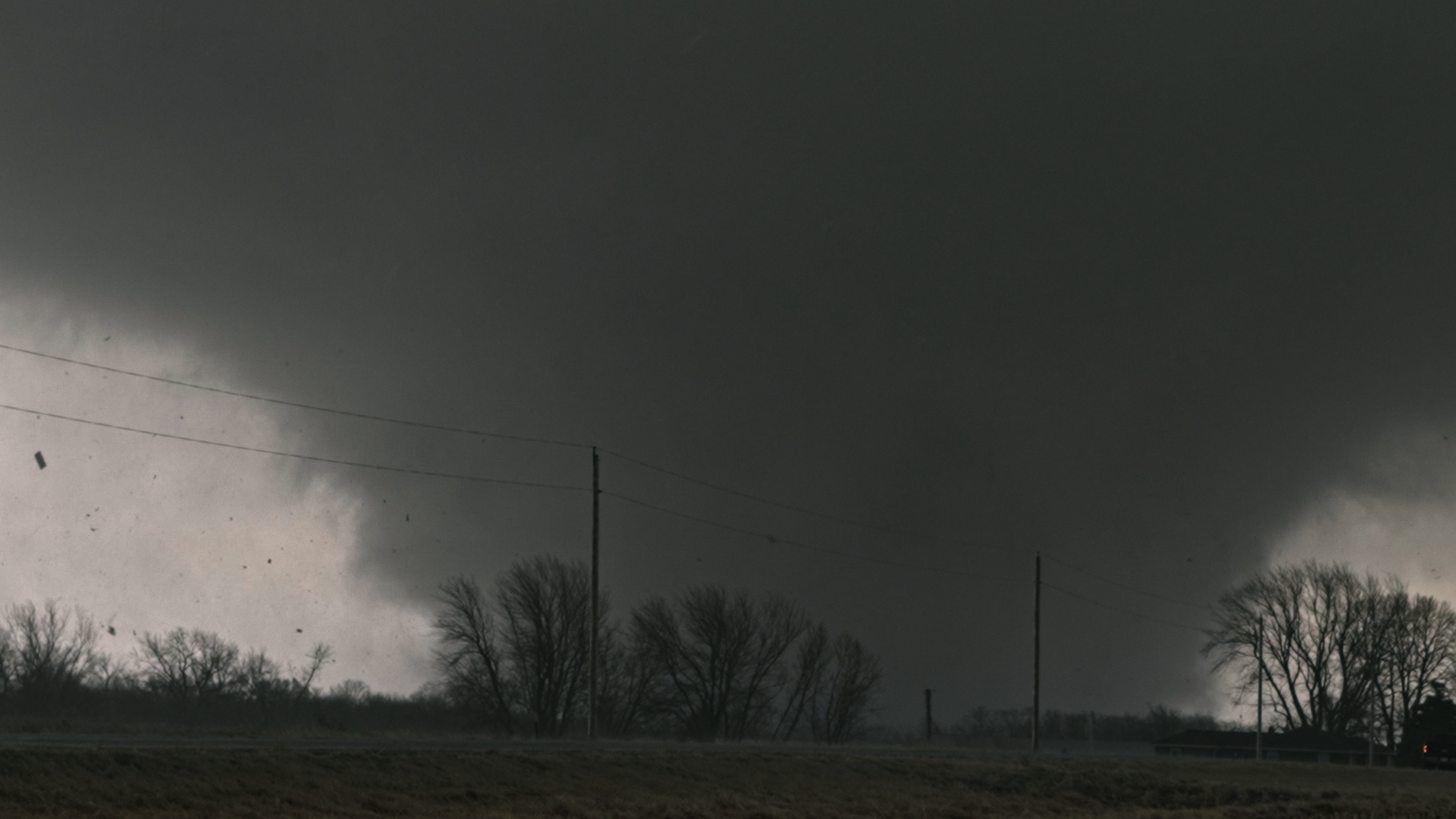
- Clockwise from top: A photo of the EF3 tornado that occurred in Andover, Kansas on April 29; Doppler Radar imagery of the Winterset, Iowa EF4 tornado on March 5 at peak strength, showing a debris ball on reflectivity and a strong velocity couplet; Devastating damage to a mobile home park following an EF3 tornado in Gaylord, Michigan, on May 20; A large EF4 tornado near Winterset, Iowa on March 5; Intense damage done to a home near Buryn, Ukraine; Visible satellite loop of a tornado outbreak on November 4.
- Timespan: January 1 – December 29
- Maximum rated tornado: EF4 tornado: Winterset, Iowa on March 5; Black Creek, Georgia on April 5; Caviness, Texas on November 4; Clarksville, Texas on November 4
- Tornadoes in U.S.: 1,176
- Damage (U.S.): >$479.288 million
- Fatalities (U.S.): 23 (Note: The National Centers for Environmental Information documents 24 tornadic fatalities in the US, however, the National Weather Service of State College confirmed a fatality marked in Lairdsville, Pennsylvania is a mistake.)
- Fatalities (worldwide): 32

This page documents notable tornadoes and tornado outbreaks worldwide in 2022. Strong and destructive tornadoes form most frequently in the United States, Argentina, Brazil, Bangladesh, and Eastern India, but can occur almost anywhere under the right conditions. Tornadoes also develop occasionally in southern Canada during the Northern Hemisphere's summer and somewhat regularly at other times of the year across Europe, Asia, Argentina, Australia and New Zealand. Tornadic events are often accompanied by other forms of severe weather, including strong thunderstorms, strong winds, and hail. Worldwide, 32 tornado-related deaths were confirmed: 23 in the United States, three in China, two each in Poland and Russia, and one each in the Netherlands and Ukraine.

Despite an extremely active beginning to the season, which included the second most active March ever recorded, tornado activity in the United States slowed significantly in the later part of spring and into the summer, bringing the season's total below average despite November and December being above average, much like 2016 and 2020, which also saw below average tornado activity. In fact, the summer was the second least active on record since 1964.

== Events ==
=== United States ===
There were 1,331 preliminary filtered reported tornadoes, and 1,176 confirmed tornadoes in the United States in 2022.

Confirmed tornadoes by Enhanced Fujita rating
EFU	EF0	EF1	EF2	EF3	EF4	EF5	Total
157	406	466	123	20	4	0	1,176

A map of 2022 United States tornado paths from the results of storm surveys

A chart of the 2022 United States tornado count estimated from the number of preliminary reports

Fatal United States tornadoes in 2022
- Approximate touchdown location of killer tornadoes in 2022 Summary of tornadoes: February 3 – Alabama (1 death); March 5 – Iowa (6 deaths); March 5 – Iowa (1 death); March 21 – Texas, Oklahoma (1 death); March 21 – Texas (1 death); March 22 – Louisiana (1 death); March 31 – Florida (2 deaths); April 5 – Georgia (1 death); May 20 – Michigan (2 deaths); November 4 – Oklahoma (1 death); November 4 – Texas (1 death); November 30 – Alabama (2 deaths); December 13 – Louisiana (2 deaths); December 14 – Louisiana (1 death); Total fatalities: 23

== January ==
=== January 1–3 (United States) ===
EFU	EF0	EF1	EF2	EF3	EF4	EF5
0	10	8	1	0	0	0

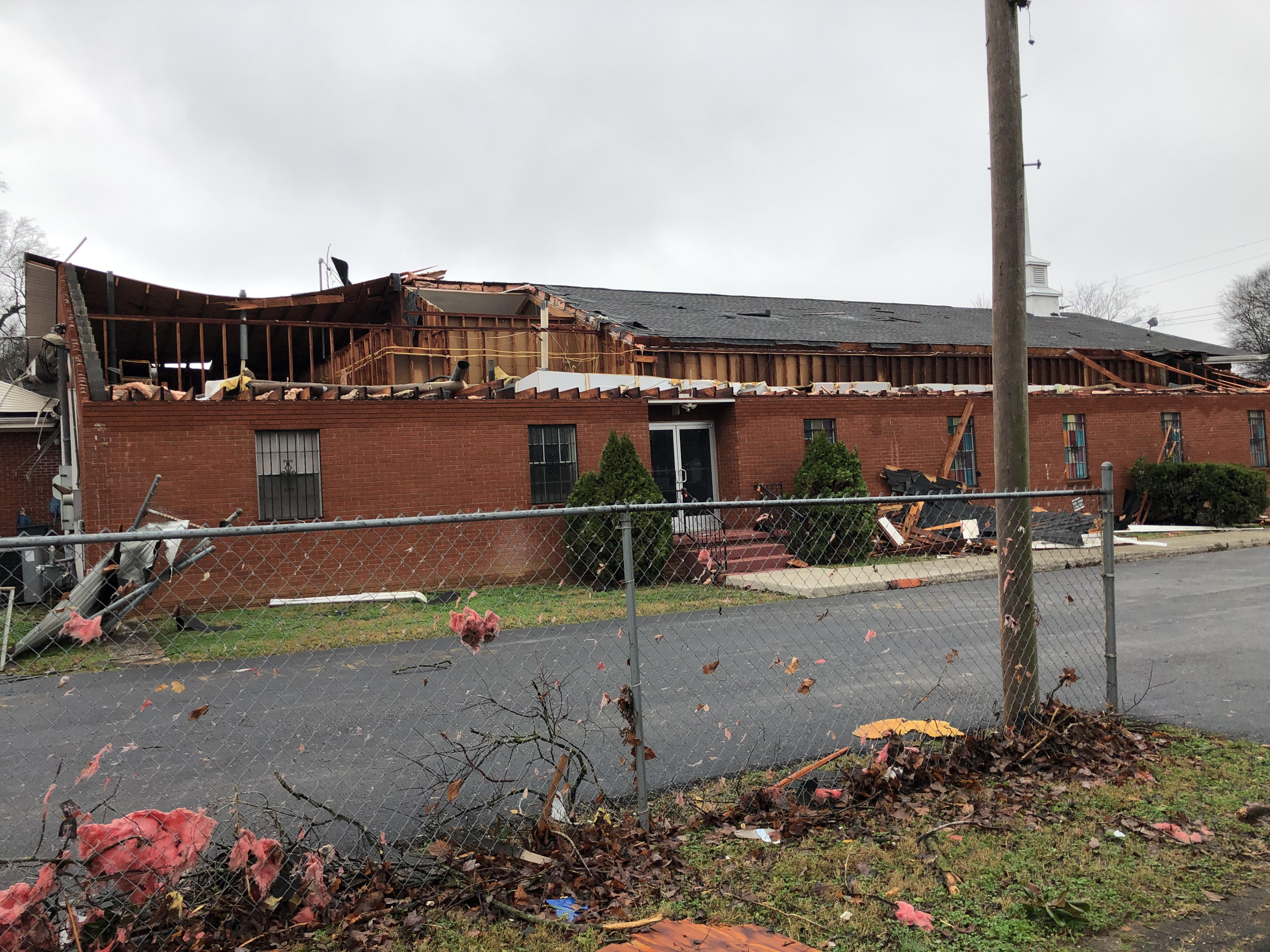
EF2 damage to a church in Hopkinsville, Kentucky.

A small outbreak of mostly weak tornadoes impacted the Southeastern United States starting with 13 confirmed tornadoes on New Year's Day. One strong tornado, rated EF2, moved through Hopkinsville, Kentucky, damaging several businesses, homes, warehouses, a church, and a gas station. A weak EF0 tornado embedded within larger area straight-line winds also caused minor damage in Bowling Green, an area previously impacted by two strong tornadoes during the previous month, which killed 16 people and injured 63 others. An EF1 tornado damaged a few homes, destroyed barns, downed trees, and knocked over gravestones at a cemetery in the Hiseville, Kentucky area. Another brief EF1 tornado caused damage to a few metal buildings and garages at the east edge Lebanon, Kentucky. Near Hazel Green, Alabama, a high-end EF0 tornado damaged several businesses, snapped tree branches, and ripped the roof off a mobile home. One person was injured, the only injury of the outbreak. Three weak, brief EF0 tornadoes touched down in Georgia and Florida on January 2. Two weak tornadoes also touched down in North Carolina during the morning of January 3 before the outbreak ended, one of which caused EF1 damage to some hog barns near Newton Grove. In all, 19 tornadoes touched down, with only one injury reported.

=== January 8–9 (United States) ===
EFU	EF0	EF1	EF2	EF3	EF4	EF5
0	5	5	1	0	0	0

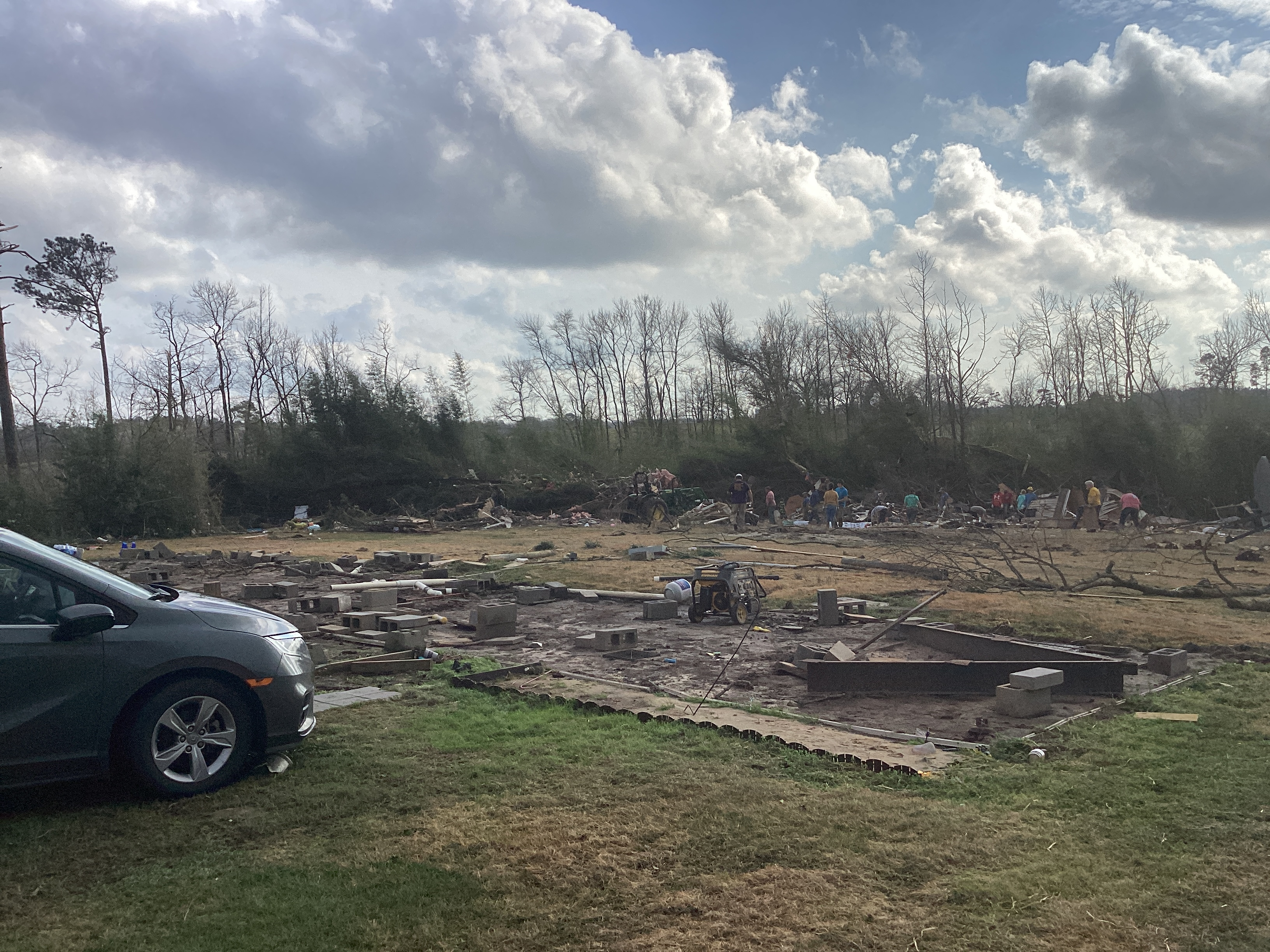
EF2 damage to a mobile home in Peason, Louisiana.

On the evening of January 8, a few weak tornadoes touched down in the area in Southeast Texas, including within the Greater Houston area, the strongest of which was an EF1 tornado that caused moderate damage to an office building and some homes near Hedwig Village. An EF0 tornado caused minor tree and structural damage near George Bush Intercontinental Airport, and another EF0 tornado also caused minor damage to a restaurant and a few other buildings in Montgomery. The following day, two EF1 tornadoes caused damage to homes, businesses, trees, vehicles, and a post office in the Humble, Texas area. Later that day, a strong EF2 tornado struck the community of Peason, Louisiana, impacting at least 30 homes and injuring six people, some critically. One mobile home was completely destroyed and swept away by the tornado, and many trees were snapped or uprooted along the path. Near Hornbeck, an EF1 tornado downed trees and caused shingle damage to a home. Two EF0 tornadoes and one EF1 tornado caused minor damage in southern Alabama as well. Overall, 11 tornadoes were confirmed.

=== January 16 (Florida) ===
EFU	EF0	EF1	EF2	EF3	EF4	EF5
0	3	3	1	0	0	0

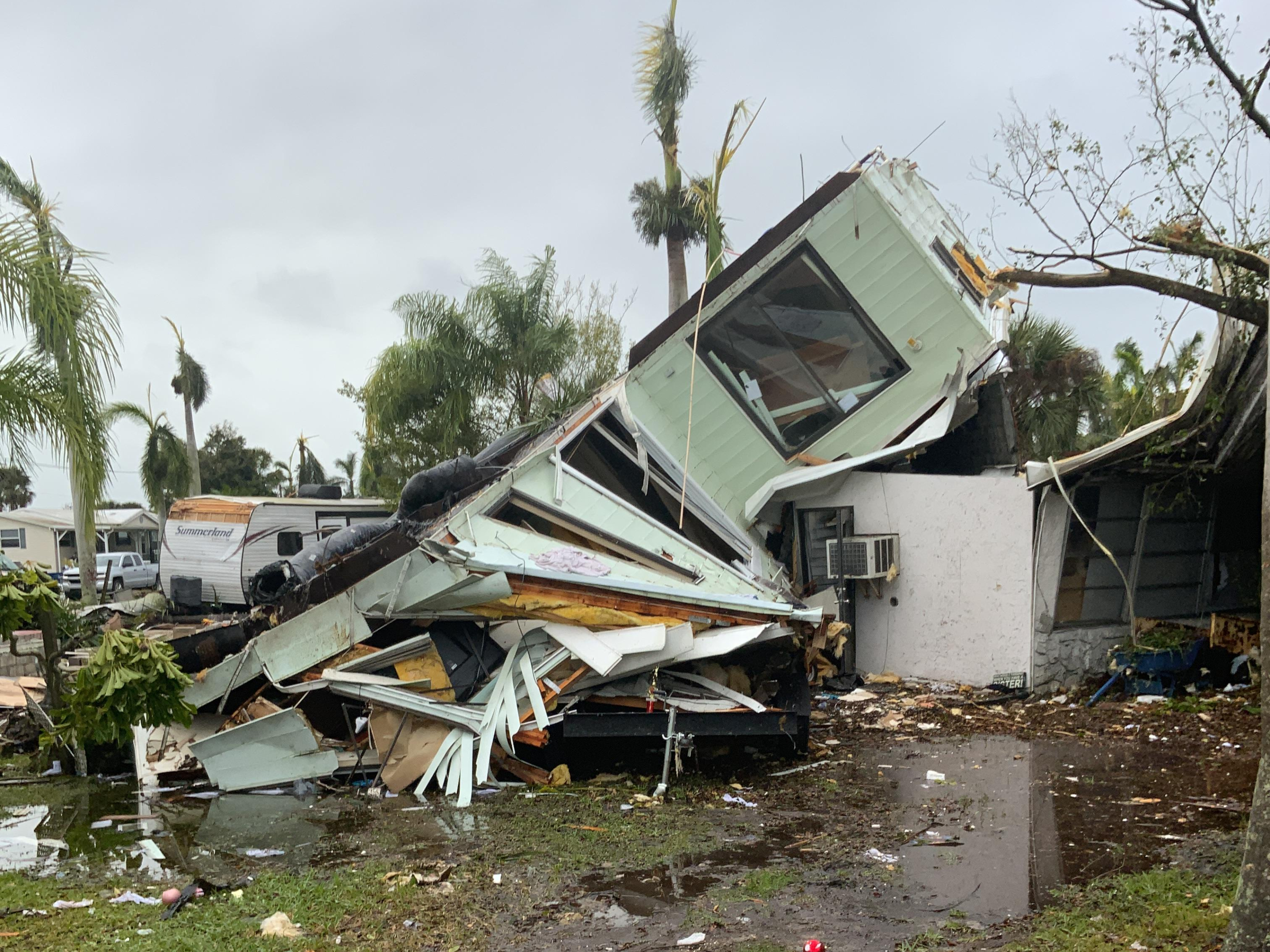
Low-end EF2 damage to a mobile home in Iona, Florida.

Several tornadoes occurred over coastal areas of Florida during the morning of January 16, most of which were the result of tornadic waterspouts moving onshore. A strong EF2 tornado caused major damage to three mobile home parks in the Fort Myers suburb of Iona. 108 mobile homes were impacted, 30 of which were destroyed and 51 of which sustained major damage. The tornado, which injured three, was caught on video by many people living in the surrounding areas. An EF1 tornado also struck a manufactured home community in Placida, damaging 35 residences at that location, and damaging several boats as well. Another EF1 tornado touched down near Port Charlotte and damaged multiple homes, a few heavily. An EF0 tornado in Collier County overturned a semi-truck and injured the driver. In all, a total of seven tornadoes were confirmed, along with four injuries.

=== January 30 (Malaysia) ===
On January 30, a damaging tornado moved through several neighborhoods in Ipoh, Malaysia, where roughly 300 homes were damaged, and many trees and power poles were downed. Some homes and businesses had their roofs torn off, signs were destroyed, and sheet metal debris was scattered throughout the damage path. No serious injuries occurred as a result of the tornado.

== February ==
=== February 3 (Alabama) ===
EFU	EF0	EF1	EF2	EF3	EF4	EF5
0	2	0	3	0	0	0

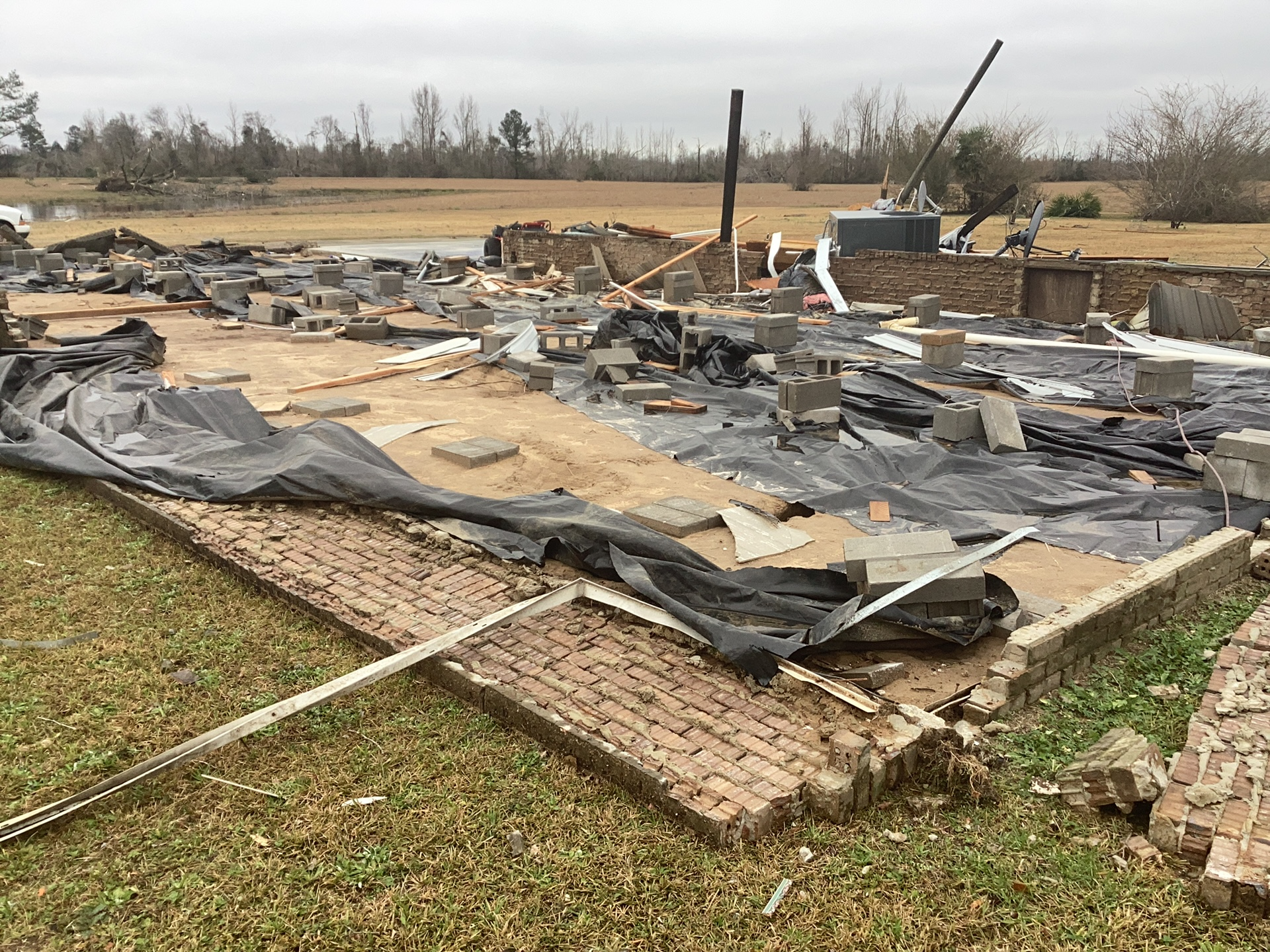
A mobile home that was completely destroyed at EF2 intensity to the northeast of Sawyerville, Alabama.

On February 3, the SPC issued a slight risk for parts of southern Mississippi and much of Alabama, including a 5% risk of tornadoes. Three strong EF2 tornadoes were spawned by an isolated supercell that moved through in west-central Alabama later that evening. The first of these tornadoes inflicted major damage to a house near Duncanville. The second one reached high-end EF2 strength and destroyed multiple mobile homes, downed many trees, and tossed two pickup trucks near Sawyerville, resulting in one fatality and eight injuries. The final EF2 tornado snapped or uprooted countless large trees in the Talladega National Forest. Two EF0 tornadoes were also confirmed, one of which downed trees and damaged carports near Deatsville, while the other caused tree, roof, and outbuilding damage near Martin Dam. A total of five tornadoes were confirmed, along with one fatality and eight injuries.

=== February 17 (Europe) ===
FU	F0	F1	F2	F3	F4	F5
4	0	7	13	0	0	0

As European Windstorm Dudley moved across Europe, it produced a significant outbreak of 24 tornadoes, 23 of which occurred in central Poland. More than half of the tornadoes were strong, producing F2 damage, and all were produced by embedded circulations and mesovortices within a squall line. The first tornado of the day was rated high-end F1 and hit the village of Casekow in eastern Germany, snapping trees, destroying horse stables, and causing substantial roof damage to several residences in town. Some large farmhouses sustained considerable damage outside of Casekow as well. In Poland, an F1 tornado damaged trees, roofs, and outbuildings in Skwierzyna. Pieces of wood were speared into the exterior wall of one structure in the village as well. An F2 tornado passed near Sucharzewo, causing significant damage to brick homes and outbuildings, including a brick cow shed that collapsed, killing a bull. Swaths of trees were mowed down in rural areas near Sucharzewo, and some debarking occurred. In Krzykosy, an unrated tornado downed trees and power lines, and damaged the roofs of several residences, including one that was completely unroofed. An F2 tornado struck Młodzikowice and another impacted Grzywna Szlachecka, largely destroying several masonry outbuildings, snapping many trees, damaging vehicles, and causing roof and window damage to homes in and around both villages. A church and some homes in the Stara Ciświca area had roofing torn off as a result of an F2 tornado, and major tree and outbuilding damage occurred as well. A duck farm near the village was significantly damaged, and several ducks were killed at that location. A tornado of unknown intensity downed trees in the town of Turek, and an F1 tornado tore the sheet metal roof off a house near Żurawin. Four other F1 tornadoes also caused considerable tree and structural damage in and around the small villages and towns of Łaski, Łęka, Lipicze Górne, and Aleksandria. To the northeast of Kalisz, an F2 tornado inflicted severe roof damage to homes, destroyed outbuildings, damaged a soccer field, and scattered debris across fields and passed through or near multiple villages. Another strong F2 tornado struck Dobrzyca, where multiple homes had their roofs and second-floor exterior walls ripped off, and streets were littered with debris. Power lines were downed, and large trees were snapped in a wooded area as well. Yet another F2 tornado caused heavy damage to buildings in Lgów, scattering debris throughout the small community. Homes had their roofs torn off, outbuildings were destroyed, debris was strewn across fields, cars were damaged, and numerous trees were snapped in a forest.

A strong F2 tornado ripped the roofs off of homes, destroyed large brick outbuildings, damaged a greenhouse, and injured two people as it impacted Wójcice and Smaszków, while another F2 tornado flipped a car and destroyed a summer home near Słomków Kościelny. In the city of Kraków, a short-lived tornado of unknown intensity caused a construction crane to collapse, resulting in two deaths and two injuries. A few buildings in Kraków had roofing blown off, and cars were damaged by flying debris. Another damaging but unrated tornado struck Sierosław, where every building in town sustained some degree of damage, a few of which had their roofs torn off and sustained some damage to their brick exterior walls. Farms sustained severe damage outside of town, metal truss transmission towers were blown over, and two semi-trucks were overturned, injuring one of the drivers. A tornado produced F2 damage to trees and structures in the Różyce Grochowe and Sulimy areas, and two additional F2 tornadoes mowed down countless trees as they moved through remote forested areas near Izdebno and Nowe Miasto nad Wartą. A brief tornado also produced F2 damage along the shore of Lake Powidzkie near Kosewo, snapping large trees, tossing boats, and damaging a residential building. In total, two people were killed and five others were injured by the tornadoes, with all injuries and fatalities occurring in Poland.

== March ==
=== March 5–7 (United States) ===
EFU	EF0	EF1	EF2	EF3	EF4	EF5
3	12	10	5	1	1	0

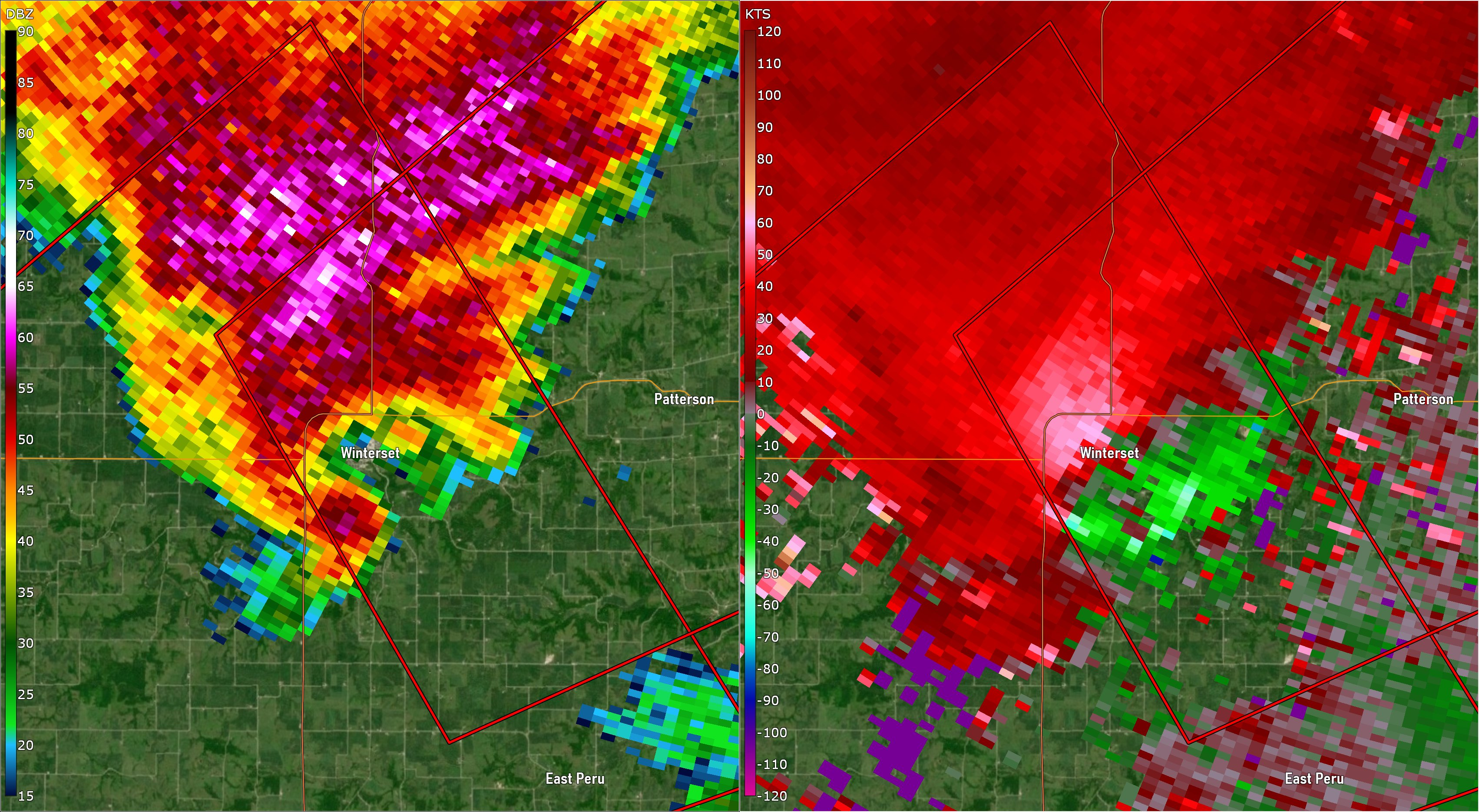
NEXRAD radar data of the EF4 tornado just south of Winterset, Iowa at peak intensity.

A tornado outbreak, spawned from a strong, negatively tilted shortwave trough, struck the Midwestern United States beginning on March 5. The state of Iowa was particularly affected. Six people were killed by a violent, Very long-tracked EF4 tornado near Winterset that completely destroyed multiple homes, a few of which were leveled or swept away. The tornado also caused severe damage as it impacted the outskirts of Norwalk and Pleasant Hill before dissipating near Newton, after nearly 70 mi (110 km) miles on the ground. An EF3 tornado near Chariton tore through a campground at Red Haw State Park, killing one person there. The same tornado also downed numerous trees, and badly damaged or destroyed multiple homes and other structures along its path. A strong EF2 tornado caused significant damage to trees, power poles, a baseball field, and a manufactured home as it clipped the outskirts of Allerton, while an EF1 tornado caused moderate damage in the town of Vinton. Near Garden Grove, outbuildings were destroyed, power poles were snapped, and a house had its roof torn off as a result of an EF2 tornado. Two other EF2 tornadoes caused damage to homes, trees, and outbuildings as they passed near the towns of Kellogg and Tama.

The storms then congealed into a squall line, producing damaging straight-line winds and isolated weak tornadoes eastward into Ohio before weakening and dissipating. Additional severe thunderstorms formed in Arkansas and Missouri the next day, with several tornadoes touching down. One intense long-tracked supercell moved from southeast Arkansas northeastward across the entire state, producing four tornadoes. The strongest was a low-end EF2 tornado that struck Sage, Arkansas and injured six people, including one seriously. Homes and outbuildings were damaged or destroyed in the Sage area, and many large trees were snapped or uprooted. Other severe storms formed that evening and produced more damaging winds and isolated weak tornadoes before weakening the next morning on March 7. One non-tornadic fatality occurred early that morning when a semi-truck carrying logs was blown over on U.S. 641 near Hazel, Kentucky, ejecting and killing the passenger. A large squall line produced widespread wind damage in Northeastern United States that afternoon, but no tornadoes touched down. A total of 32 tornadoes were confirmed, with seven tornadic fatalities, one non-tornadic fatality, and at least 12 injuries.

=== March 21–23 (United States) ===
EFU	EF0	EF1	EF2	EF3	EF4	EF5
2	29	38	13	3	0	0

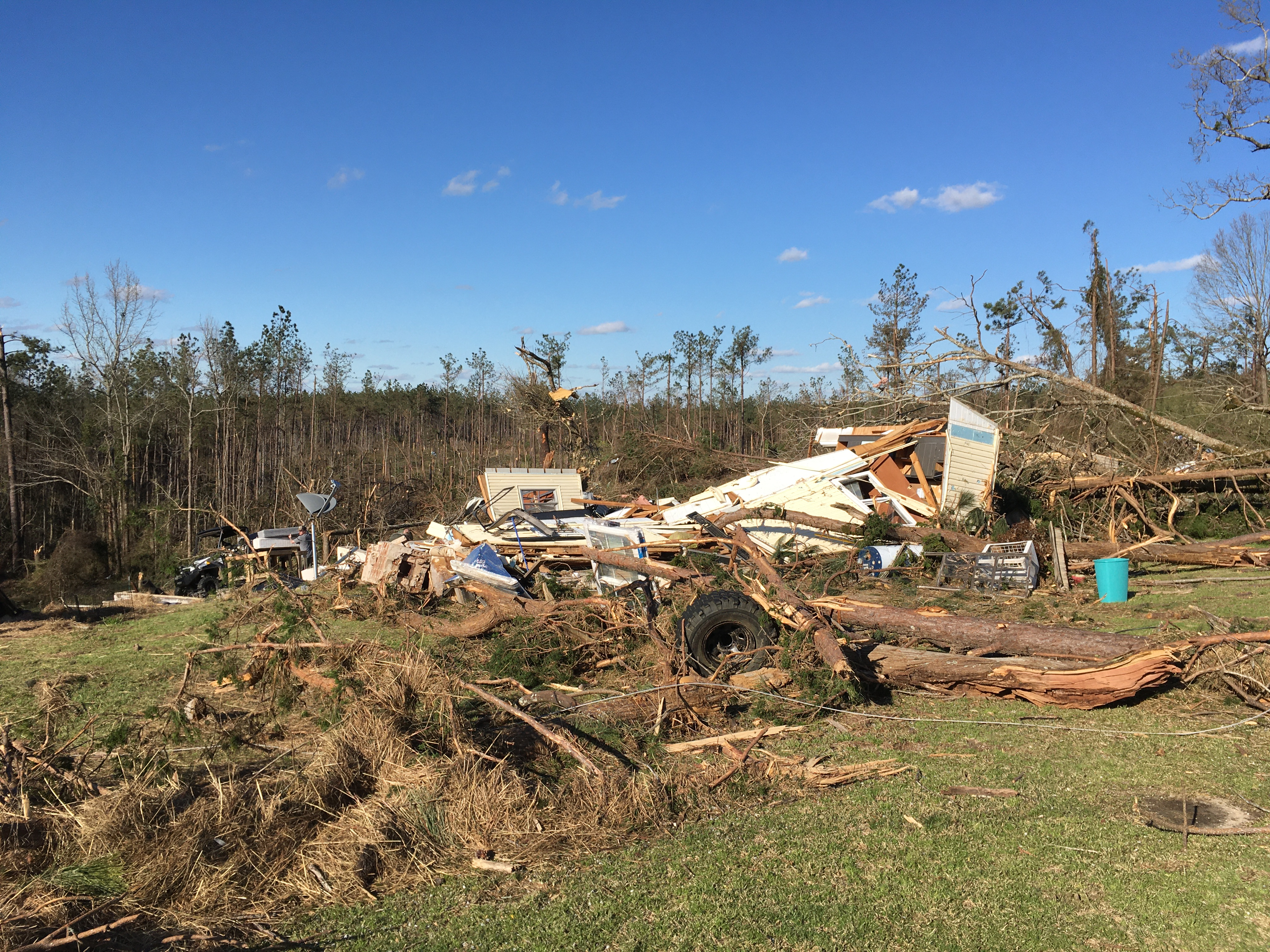
EF3 damage to a house in the rural community of Damascus, Mississippi.

A three-day tornado outbreak unfolded across the Southern and Eastern United States, beginning on March 21. That morning, the Storm Prediction Center issued a moderate risk in anticipation for the event, as favorable conditions for severe weather developed over east-central Texas, where a 15%, hatched area for tornadoes, indicating the possibility of strong tornadoes, was introduced. Multiple supercell thunderstorms formed over the area on March 21, prompting the issuance of numerous tornado warnings in Texas and southern Oklahoma, including several PDS tornado warnings. An EF3 tornado caused major damage to homes and school buildings in the city of Jacksboro, Texas, and destroyed some wind turbines and metal truss towers outside of town, injuring nine people. The same supercell produced an EF2 tornado in Sherwood Shores, Texas, that caused major damage to homes, destroyed mobile homes, killed one person, and injured 11 others before crossing the state line and causing severe damage at the Buncombe Creek Marina near Kingston, Oklahoma. Two EF1 tornadoes caused considerable damage near Bowie, Texas, and injured three people, while a high-end EF2 tornado flipped cars and caused major damage to homes and businesses in the Austin suburb of Round Rock, as well as areas to the northeast, injuring 16 others. Later that evening, numerous additional strong tornadoes touched down across eastern Texas, including an EF2 tornado that killed one person and injured 10 others in and around Crockett, where multiple homes and a convenience store suffered major structural damage.

Another strong supercell produced high-end EF2 damage near Ore City, destroying homes and mobile homes and injuring seven people. Other strong EF2 tornadoes occurred near the towns of Kingsbury, Elgin and Cushing. Tornadic activity continued into March 22 as the system moved eastward into Louisiana and Mississippi where another moderate risk, including a 15% hatched risk area for tornadoes, was issued. Numerous tornadoes reported in both states as well as Alabama, including an EF3 tornado struck rural Kemper County, Mississippi in the Damascus area, producing severe tree damage and destroying a couple of homes. Later that evening, a strong multiple-vortex EF3 tornado was broadcast live on television as it caused major damage in the New Orleans metropolitan area, with the most severe damage occurring in the inner suburb of Arabi. Many homes were destroyed and vehicles were tossed in Arabi, where one person was killed, and two more were injured. On March 23, more tornadoes were confirmed in states farther to the east, including two EF2 tornadoes that caused significant damage near Pickens, South Carolina, and Gladesboro, Virginia. A few weak EF0 tornadoes were confirmed as far north as Ohio. A total of 85 tornadoes occurred as a result of this outbreak, which resulted in three tornadic fatalities, three non-tornadic fatalities, and at least 67 injuries.

=== March 29–31 (United States) ===
EFU	EF0	EF1	EF2	EF3	EF4	EF5
0	21	57	9	3	0	0

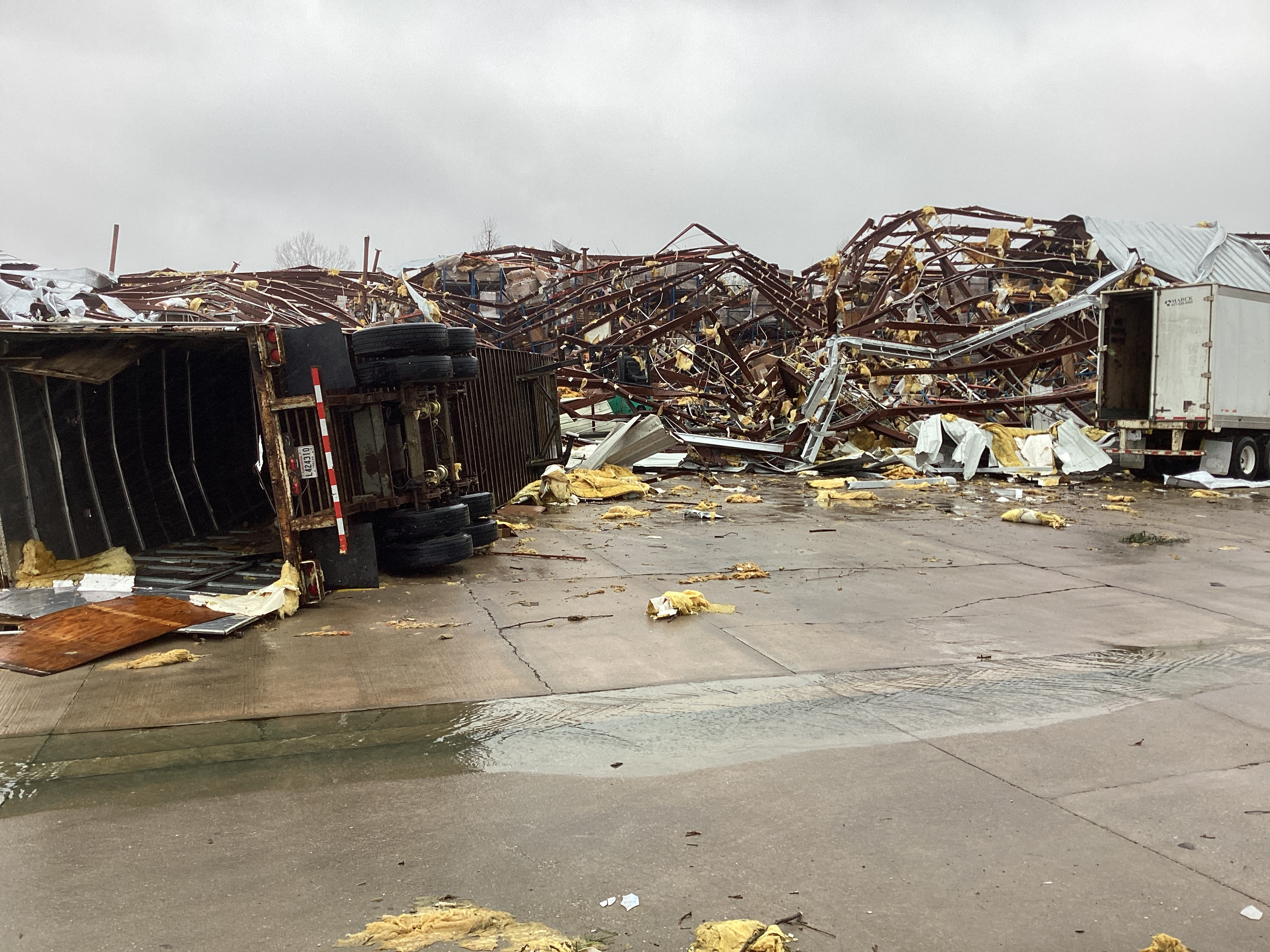
A large distribution warehouse destroyed by an EF3 tornado in Springdale, Arkansas.

Another significant tornado outbreak struck the Southern and Eastern United States at the end of March. The outbreak began on March 29, with two EF1 tornadoes, one of which caused considerable damage a home and a school in St. Joseph, Missouri, and the other causing damage to outbuildings and farm equipment near Valley Falls, Kansas. On March 30, the SPC issued a moderate risk of severe weather for much of the Deep South, including a 15% hatched risk of tornadoes. Early that morning, an EF3 tornado in Springdale, Arkansas, caused extensive structural damage to homes, businesses, and a school, and injured seven people. Later that day, an EF1 tornado was broadcast live television by local news networks as it moved through Jackson, Mississippi, causing minor to moderate tree and structural damage. An EF2 tornado ripped much of the roof off of a school in Tallulah, Louisiana, while another EF2 tornado struck McLain, Mississippi, where it inflicted severe damage to an apartment building, destroyed chicken houses, and snapped or uprooted numerous large trees. An EF3 tornado in Bibb and Shelby counties in Alabama injured two people, snapped and debarked countless trees in remote forested areas, and destroyed some RV campers at a hunting club. It caused roof damage to dormitory buildings at the University of Montevallo in Montevallo, Alabama, near the end of its damage path. Significant tornado activity continued into the early morning of March 31, and an EF3 tornado completely destroyed multiple homes and mobile homes near Alford, Florida, killing two people and injuring three others. A multiple-vortex EF2 tornado destroyed two barns and snapped hundreds of large trees in Wayne Township, Pennsylvania later that day, and another EF2 tornado severely damaged a house and a chicken farm near Norwood, North Carolina. An EF1 tornado in Lairdsville, Pennsylvania, destroyed multiple barns, damaged homes and businesses, and downed trees. In addition to the tornadoes, a fast-moving squall line of severe thunderstorms produced damaging 70 mile-per-hour (110 km/h) straight-line winds across the threat area. This outbreak produced a total of 90 tornadoes, making it the largest tornado outbreak of 2022. Two fatalities and 17 injuries were confirmed.

== April ==
=== April 4–7 (United States) ===
EFU	EF0	EF1	EF2	EF3	EF4	EF5
2	26	47	10	3	1	0

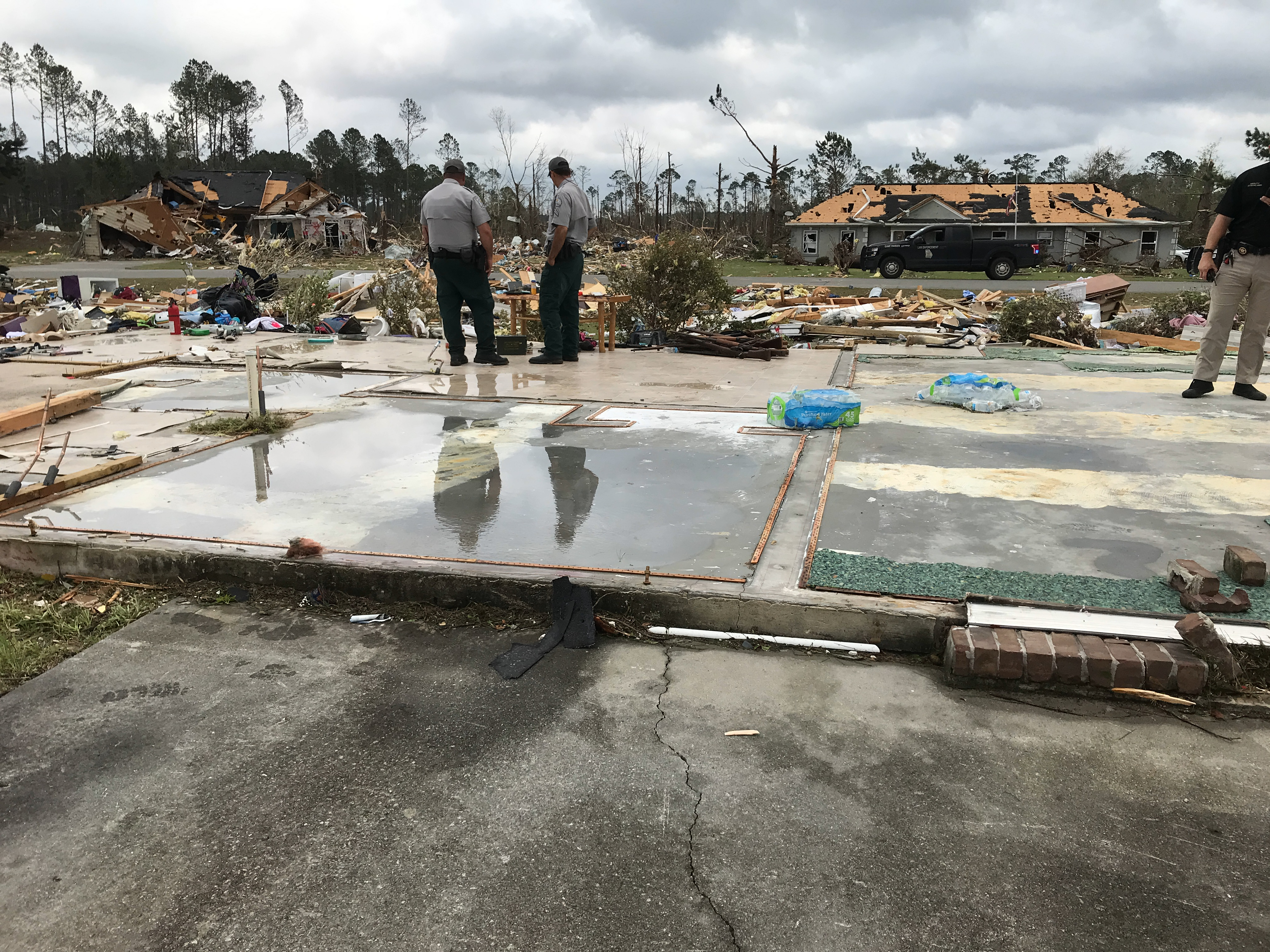
A home swept off its foundation at EF4 intensity in Black Creek, Georgia.

On April 4, an enhanced risk for severe thunderstorms was issued from Texas to Mississippi. Scattered severe thunderstorms over Texas during the afternoon congealed into a severe squall line that moved east over the Southern United States. Several tornadoes were confirmed around the Dallas–Fort Worth metroplex late on April 4, including an EF2 tornado that damaged multiple homes and injured one person near Egan. As the line progressed eastward, numerous tornadoes occurred across Mississippi, Alabama, Georgia, and South Carolina spawned by embedded circulations and supercell thunderstorms that formed within the squall line. A high-end EF3 tornado within the line significantly damaged or destroyed multiple homes and caused several minor injuries in Bonaire, Georgia. Discrete supercells also formed ahead of the squall line in Georgia and South Carolina and quickly became tornadic, spawning multiple powerful, long-tracked tornadoes. A large low-end EF3 tornado prompted a tornado emergency for Allendale and Sycamore, South Carolina, as it destroyed mobile homes and heavily damaged other buildings, trees, and power lines, injuring one person. Numerous other tornadoes were confirmed elsewhere in South Carolina and in Georgia. One death and 12 injuries were confirmed after an EF4 tornado heavily damaged or destroyed several homes and other structures in Pembroke and Black Creek, Georgia, including a few homes that were leveled or swept clean from their foundations. An intense high-end EF3 tornado knocked down a large swath of trees northeast of Ulmer, South Carolina, and a low-end EF2 tornado caused heavy damage to homes, businesses, trees, and power lines in Manning, South Carolina. Severe storms refired across large portion of the Southeast on April 6–7, with more tornadoes being reported in Florida, southern and central Georgia and southeastern South Carolina, although they were all weak. This included an EF1 tornado that caused moderate damage to numerous homes and structures in the town of Kite, Georgia. In all, 89 tornadoes were confirmed as a result of this outbreak, along with one tornadic fatality, two non-tornadic fatalities, and at least 16 injuries.

=== April 11–13 (United States) ===
EFU	EF0	EF1	EF2	EF3	EF4	EF5
4	26	38	5	1	0	0

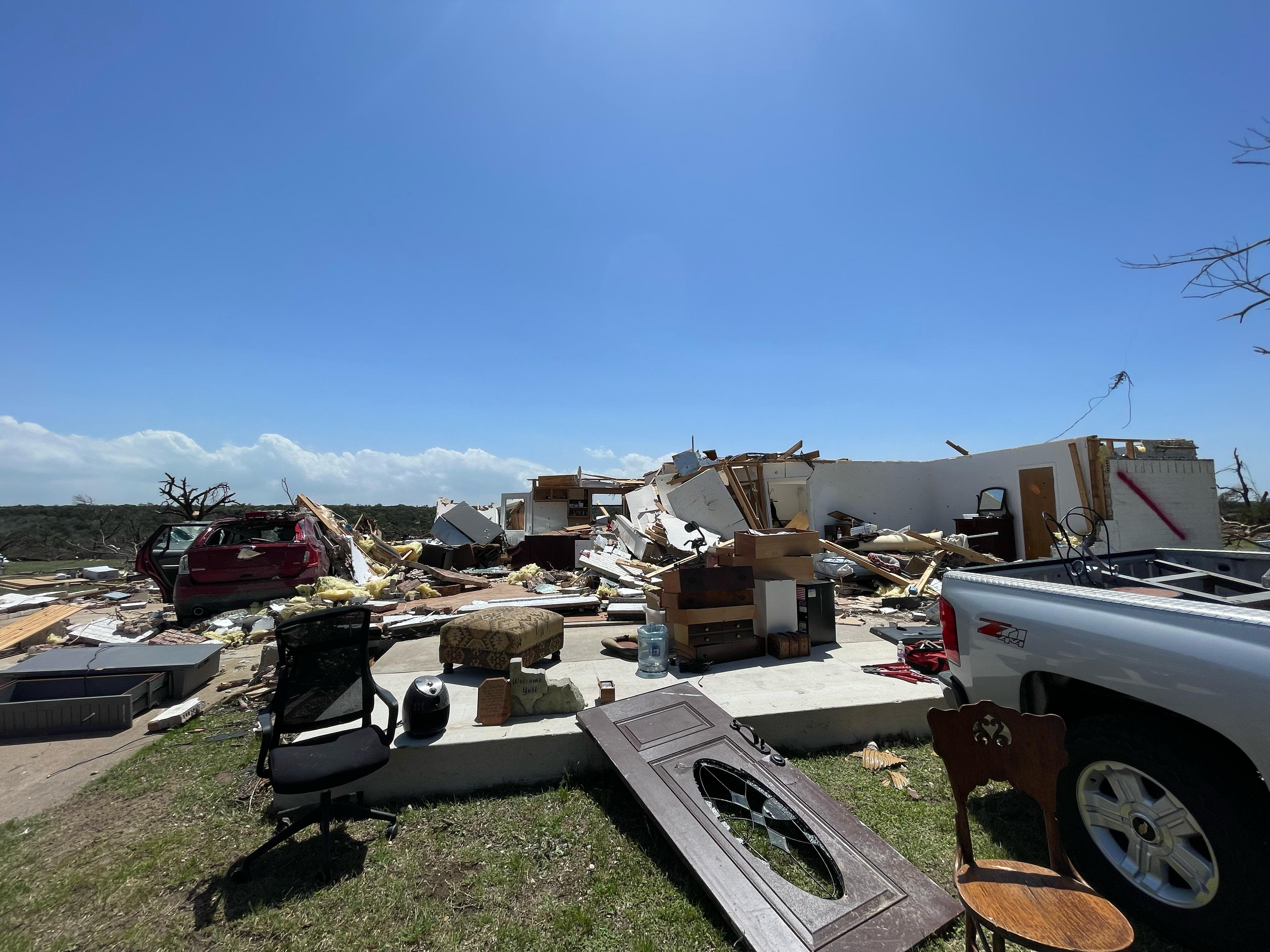
High-end EF3 damage to a home west-southwest of Salado, Texas.

Another tornado outbreak occurred across the Great Plains, Midwest, and Southern United States in mid-April. The outbreak began on April 11, when four EF1 tornadoes touched down across Arkansas, one of which prompted a tornado emergency for areas to the north of Little Rock. An EFU tornado also touched down in Oklahoma as well. The next day, the SPC issued a moderate risk for much of Iowa, with a 15% hatched risk for strong tornadoes outlined. Later that day, a strong EF2 tornado caused major damage to homes, destroyed barns and outbuildings, and injured one person near Gilmore City, Iowa. Another EF2 tornado caused significant damage to structures near Rutland. Additional tornadic storms formed in Texas, as well as Kansas as far north as southern Minnesota. Multiple tornadoes were reported in Texas, including a destructive high-end EF3 tornado that caused severe damage near Florence and Salado. Twenty-three injuries occurred near Salado as several homes and two churches were destroyed, and severe damage to trees and vehicles occurred as well. Later that night, a damaging EF2 tornado struck the small town of Taopi, Minnesota, inflicting major damage to homes, flipping cars, and injuring two people. Severe and tornadic weather continued into overnight and increased again the next day, and the SPC issued another moderate risk with a 15% hatched risk area for tornadoes and a 45% hatched risk area for damaging winds across several states in the Deep South on the morning of April 13. Numerous tornadoes touched down that day, though most were weak. A large and long-tracked EF2 tornado passed south of Meridian, Mississippi, and moved through the community of Clarkdale, where many trees, homes, and a school building sustained significant damage. Another EF2 tornado caused severe tree damage near Sikes, Louisiana. Widespread wind damage also occurred that day. In Rison, Arkansas, several trees were blown down by straight-line winds, including one that fell on a mobile home, resulting in a fatality. Overall, this outbreak produced a total of 74 tornadoes, none of which resulted in any fatalities, though at least 28 injuries occurred along with two non-tornadic deaths.

=== April 29–30 (United States) ===
EFU	EF0	EF1	EF2	EF3	EF4	EF5
7	10	11	0	1	0	0

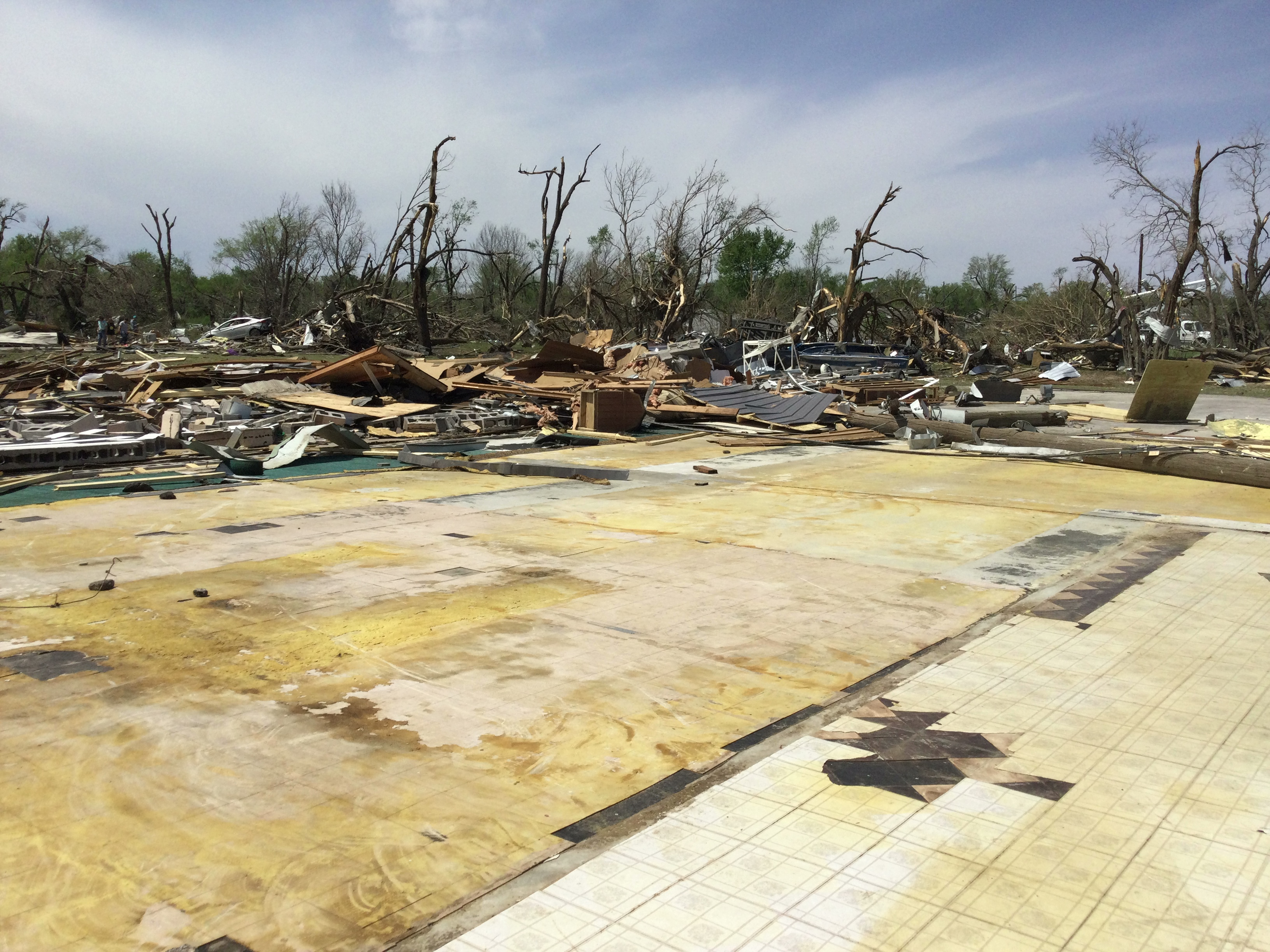
A pet supplies shop in Andover, Kansas that was completely swept from its foundation at EF3 intensity.

On April 29, a moderate risk for severe weather was issued for portions of eastern Kansas and southern Nebraska, including a 15% risk of tornadoes. Later that evening, several tornadoes struck the central Great Plains, most of which were weak. This included an EF1 tornado near St. George, Kansas that caused roof damage to a house and an outbuilding, destroyed a windmill and a carport, flipped irrigation pivots, and snapped trees. Another EF1 tornado passed near Herington, damaging the roofs of homes, destroying silos and outbuildings, and snapping trees in the town of Parkerville before dissipating. The most significant tornado of the event was a well-documented and destructive EF3 tornado that tore through Andover, Kansas, causing major structural damage to a YMCA branch, tossing vehicles, and destroying numerous homes. An elementary school in Andover was also damaged, a pet supplies shop was obliterated, and many trees were snapped or debarked. Three people were injured and 1,074 buildings were damaged in and around Andover, 321 of which were destroyed. There were also three indirect injuries and total damage was $41.5 million. On October 26, 2022, at the AMS 30th Conference on Severe Local Storms, the European Severe Storms Laboratory presented evidence that this EF3 tornado potentially had winds of at least 118.0 metres per second (264 mph) using photogrammetry. At the conference, they also showed a graphic of the measured instantaneous wind gust matching within the range of IF4 and IF5 on the International Fujita scale, which does have a wind speed measurement damage indicator. A multiple-vortex EF1 tornado also destroyed barns and outbuildings near Rosalia, east of El Dorado, and caused minor damage within the town of Rosalia itself before dissipating. Farther north, a few weak tornadoes also touched down in Nebraska, and severe storms impacted Iowa and Missouri as well, where reports of hail and damaging straight-line winds were received. Farther south, a brief EF0 tornado struck near Fort Myers, Florida, as well, causing minor roof, carport, and fence damage. A few weak tornadoes touched down in Missouri, Illinois, and Arkansas the next day, none of which exceeded EF0 intensity. This included an EF0 tornado that damaged or destroyed machine sheds and damaged a couple of houses near Perryville, Missouri. A total of 29 tornadoes were confirmed as a result of this outbreak; and with the exception of the Andover tornado, all of them were weak.

Three indirect fatalities occurred as a result of the severe weather; three meteorology students from the University of Oklahoma were killed in a motor vehicle accident on I-35 near Tonkawa, Oklahoma, while returning from storm chasing late on April 29. Their car hydroplaned off the road and was struck by another vehicle. The event received an outpouring of grief and support from students, meteorologists and the University of Oklahoma.

== May ==
=== May 4–6 (United States) ===
EFU	EF0	EF1	EF2	EF3	EF4	EF5
3	4	16	4	1	0	0

Radar loop from the NWS Norman radar showing multiple supercells on May 4, 2022.

On May 4, a moderate risk was issued for an area from Central Oklahoma southward into North Texas, including a 15% risk of tornadoes. Multiple tornadic supercells formed that afternoon and evening, spawning several tornadoes that tore through the area, including a few that were strong. This included a mile-wide EF2 multiple-vortex tornado that caused extensive damage in the town of Seminole, Oklahoma, where multiple homes, businesses, and other buildings were heavily damaged, and some had their roofs torn off. Numerous trees and power poles were snapped throughout the town, and several garages and older brick buildings were destroyed. An EF0 tornado struck a cannabis farm near the town of Maud, where multiple greenhouses and trailers were destroyed. An EF1 tornado damaged homes, power poles, and trees in Cromwell, while another EF2 tornado caused significant damage to a business, homes, outbuildings, and trees along an unusual looping path as it clipped the east edge of Earlsboro.

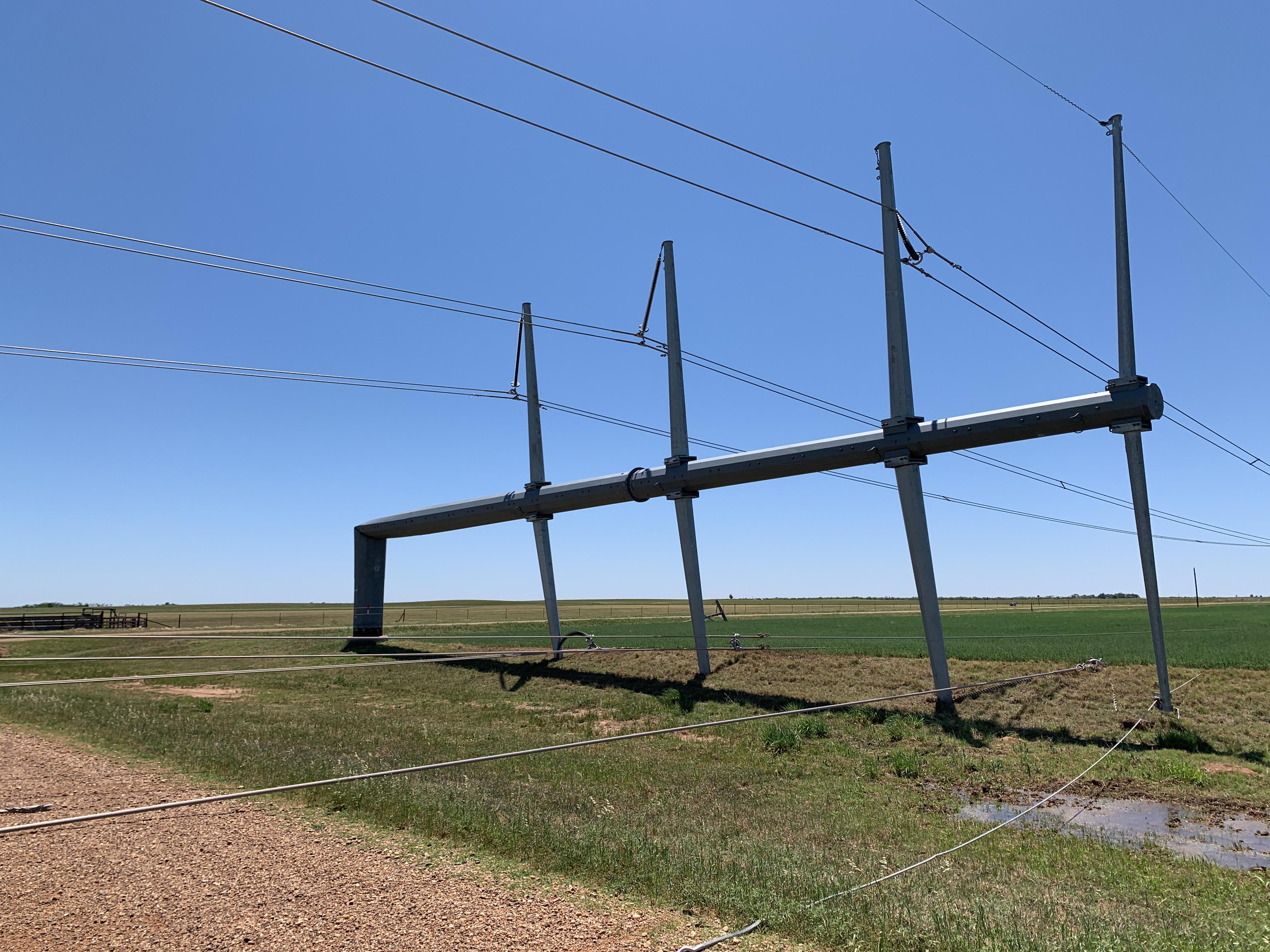
Low-end EF3 damage to a large metal power pole near Lockett, Texas.

Farther to the south, a large EF3 tornado touched down near Lockett, Texas, bending large steel power poles to the ground in a rural area and scouring topsoil before striking the town, where metal buildings were destroyed, sheet metal was wrapped around trees, one storm shelter lost its door, homes and other structures had their roofs torn off, and multiple vehicles were moved and damaged, including a storm chasing tour van that was blown off the road, resulting in a few minor injuries. More severe weather was expected the next day and an enhanced risk for severe weather was issued from Central Texas northeastward into much of Arkansas. Damaging winds were expected to be the main hazards, but a few tornadoes were expected. Five tornadoes touched down that afternoon in Oklahoma, Texas, and Arkansas. This included an EF2 tornado that destroyed barns, shifted a house off its foundation, damaged mobile homes, and snapped numerous trees near Henderson, Texas, injuring one person. Another EF2 tornado touched down near Almyra, Arkansas, destroying a pole barn and toppling several metal truss transmission towers, one of which had a metal shipping container thrown into its base. The severe weather risk shifted eastward on May 6 and another enhanced risk was issued from Central Alabama northeastward into Southern Virginia, with both damaging winds and tornadoes expected to be the primary hazards. Several tornadoes touched down that afternoon, though all were weak. This included an EF1 tornado that snapped trees, destroyed outbuildings, damaged the Lake Cumberland Speedway, and rolled two manufactured homes near Bronston, Kentucky, injuring two people. In Mobile, Alabama, a high-end EF1 tornado destroyed a poorly built Family Dollar store, and caused less severe damage to some other buildings and trees. An EF0 tornado touched down in Perry, Florida, as well, peeling back the metal roof of a tavern in town and causing minor tree, fence, and house damage. Severe weather on May 6 forced the MLB to postpone six baseball games, the most in a single day since April 15, 2018. In all, 28 tornadoes touched down, causing at least three injuries.

=== May 12 (United States) ===
EFU	EF0	EF1	EF2	EF3	EF4	EF5
1	9	17	5	0	0	0

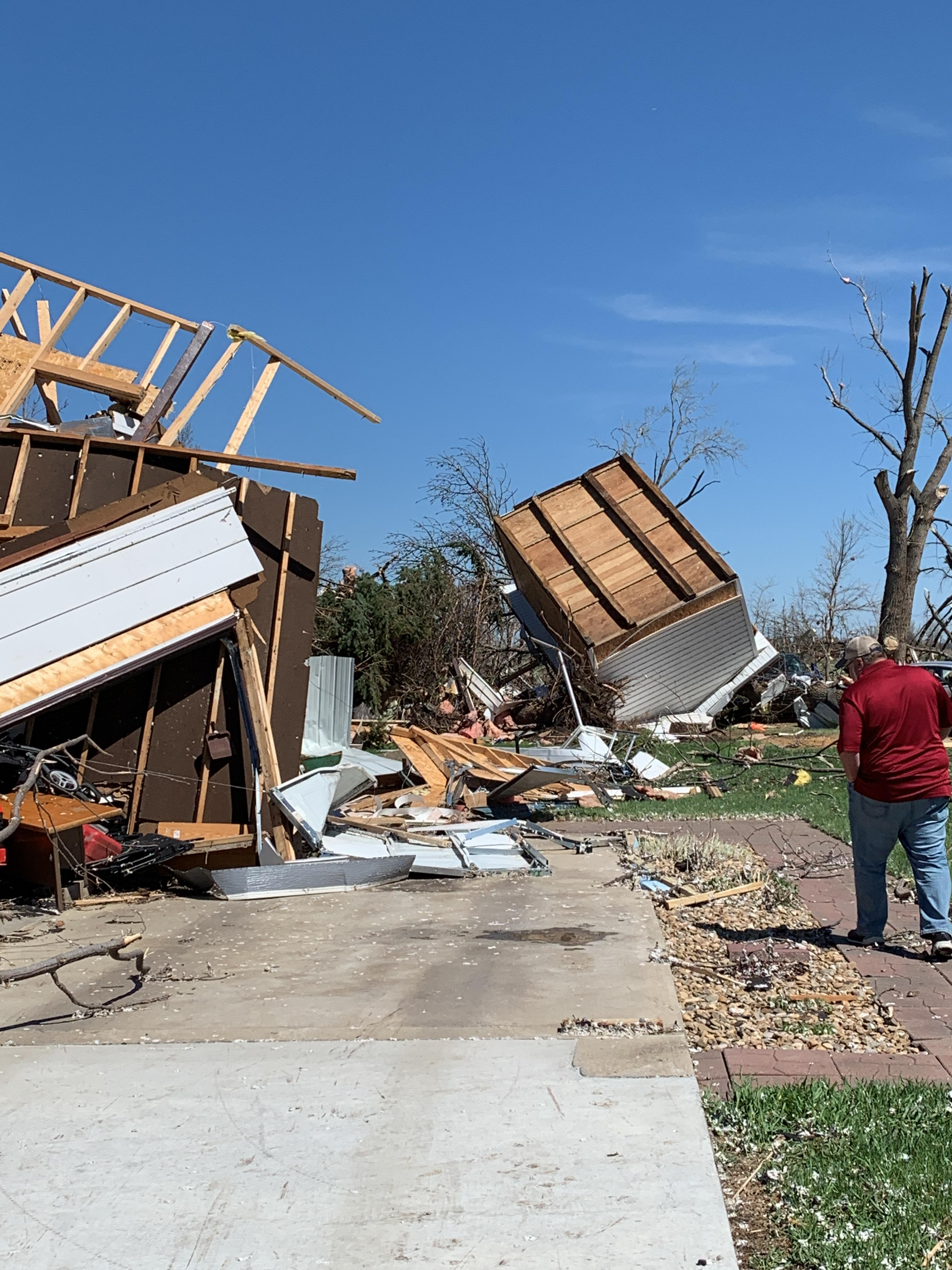
EF2 damage to a home and an overturned shed in Castlewood, South Dakota.

On May 12, the SPC issued a moderate risk for the Upper Midwest, from western Minnesota and southeastern North Dakota to northeastern Nebraska and extreme northwestern Iowa, including eastern South Dakota. Conditions were favorable for a significant straight-line wind event, though a secondary threat of strong tornadoes was also present, and a 10% hatched tornado risk area was outlined as well. Two tornado watches were issued later that day, but the main watch was a PDS severe thunderstorm watch that was issued across the area as well, indicating the possibility of tornadoes and severe wind gusts to 105 miles per hour (169 km/h). A strong derecho developed over Nebraska and moved northeast, affecting parts of Iowa, Minnesota, and the Dakotas with destructive straight-line winds that exceeded 100 miles per hour (160 km/h) in some areas, causing widespread damage to trees, power lines, buildings, and agriculture. Circulations embedded within and along the leading edge of the derecho produced numerous tornadoes, a few of which were strong. A high-end EF2 tornado caused major damage to a farm south of Gary, South Dakota, ripping the roof and exterior walls off a house and injuring one person. A strong EF2 rope tornado hit Castlewood, where homes sustained severe damage, a school building had much of its roof torn off, sheds and garages were destroyed, many trees and power poles were snapped, and one person was injured. Another EF2 tornado destroyed outbuildings and inflicted significant damage to a dairy farm near Estelline, while an EF1 tornado damaged homes, trees, and a baseball field in Madison, Minnesota. A low-end EF2 tornado snapped many trees and power poles in and around Campbell, and heavily damaged large grain bins at a grain elevator in town. Another EF2 tornado caused damage to metal buildings and impacted Verndale and Blue Grass, where numerous trees and power poles were snapped, some of which landed on homes and vehicles. A high-end EF1 tornado also touched down in Alexandria, where many trees were downed and homes sustained varying degrees of roof damage, a couple of which suffered partial to total roof loss. No tornado-related fatalities occurred, though at least three people were killed by straight-line winds. Overall, a total of 32 tornadoes were confirmed.

=== May 18–21 (United States and Canada) ===
EFU	EF0	EF1	EF2	EF3	EF4	EF5
1	13	7	3	1	0	0

A period of sporadic tornadic activity affected the Great Lakes, Upper Mississippi Valley, and the Mid-Atlantic beginning on May 18, when an EF0 tornado caused tree damage near Rice Lake, Minnesota. On May 19, a long-tracked EF2 tornado touched down near Keensburg, Illinois, before moving across the southeast side of Mount Carmel, then crossing into Indiana and striking Decker. Countless large trees were snapped or uprooted along the path, many or which landed on structures, and power poles were also snapped. Barns were destroyed and pivot irrigation sprinklers were flipped in rural areas, and the tornado ended up crossing the White River seven times before dissipating. An EF1 tornado downed trees in and around Greenville, Illinois, destroying barns and damaging a few homes in areas outside of town as well. A few weak EF0 tornadoes also touched down in parts of the St. Louis, Missouri metropolitan area, causing minor tree damage. On May 20, a destructive EF3 tornado swept through the city of Gaylord, Michigan, killing two people and injuring 44 others. Many homes and businesses in Gaylord were severely damaged or destroyed, cars were tossed in parking lots, and RVs were thrown and demolished at a dealership. The two fatalities occurred at a mobile home park in town, where multiple mobile homes were completely destroyed. This tornado was the first to be rated EF3 in Michigan since 2012, and caused over 6,000 people to lose power. The Gaylord tornado caused $50 million in damage. Farther east, an EF0 tornado briefly touched down in Aberdeen, New Jersey, downing trees and causing minor damage to some homes. On May 21, isolated weak tornadoes occurred across parts of Indiana and Arkansas, resulting in marginal damage. Severe weather at Wrigley Field postponed a game between the Chicago Cubs and Arizona Diamondbacks.

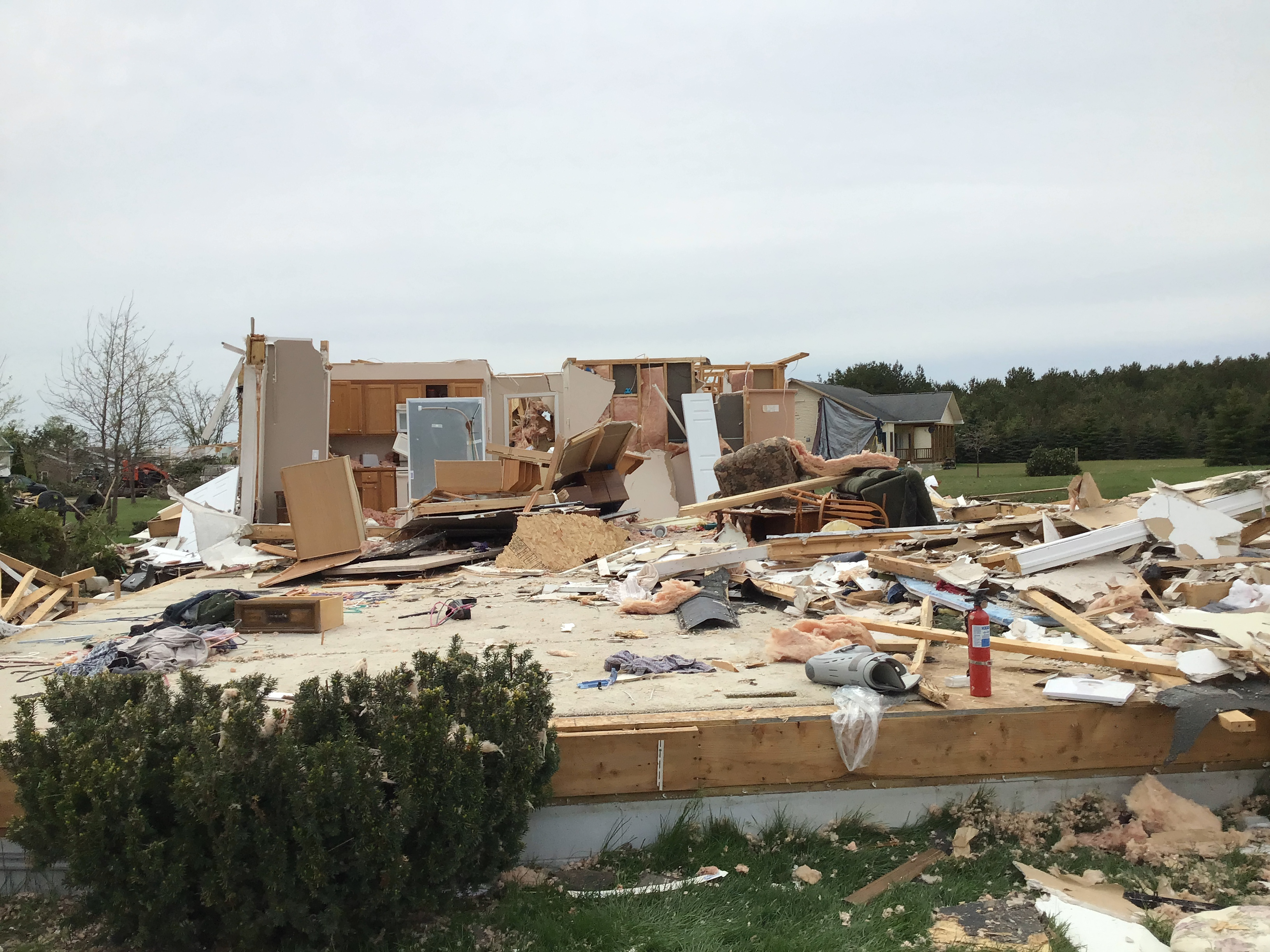
EF3 damage to a house in Gaylord, Michigan.

However, a more significant severe weather event unfolded on May 21 farther north in Canada, as a powerful and deadly derecho with wind gusts of up to 118 mph (190 km/h; 53 m/s) caused extensive damage across large areas of Ontario and Quebec, resulting in 11 fatalities from straight-line winds. The London, Ottawa, Toronto, Montreal, and Quebec City metro areas all sustained significant impacts from the derecho, along with many other smaller cities and towns. The intense winds toppled many trees and power lines, damaged buildings, shattered windows, and caused massive power outages. The derecho produced four embedded QLCS tornadoes, including two EF1 tornadoes that moved through parts of London, Ontario, one of which touched down in the Huron Heights section of the city, snapping and uprooting trees, damaging the roof of an apartment building, and damaging hangars and small planes at an airport. The other EF1 tornado struck the Wilton Grove neighborhood, badly damaging a warehouse, bending a power pole, and downing trees. The third tornado spawned by the derecho was strong, producing EF2 damage in Uxbridge, Ontario, where a brewery and a three-story apartment building were unroofed, cars were flipped, and many large trees were snapped or uprooted, some of which landed on structures and vehicles. Other apartment buildings, homes, and a church in town had large portions of their roofs ripped off, a train station was damaged, and many power lines were also downed. Another embedded EF2 tornado touched down east of Lake Scugog and passed near the rural communities of Janetville and Yelverton, damaging or destroying multiple outbuildings, barns, and machine sheds. Numerous trees were snapped as the tornado impacted wooded areas. About 950,000 people in Canada lost power due to the derecho. Overall, a total of 25 tornadoes occurred. The severe weather resulted in two tornado-related fatalities, and an 11 additional fatalities from the derecho. Numerous injuries also occurred.

=== May 20 (Europe) ===
FU	F0	F1	F2	F3	F4	F5
0	1	6	3	0	0	0

A small tornado outbreak produced several tornadoes in multiple countries in Europe on May 20, including three strong F2 tornadoes that caused significant damage and numerous injuries in Germany. In Russia, a brief F0 tornado caused minor roof damage in Ilovlya. In the Netherlands, an F1 tornado struck Beek, where homes sustained severe roof damage and garden sheds were destroyed. In Germany, one long-tracked supercell produced at least five tornadoes. The first was a strong F2 wedge tornado which touched down to the west of Lippstadt in the German state of North Rhine-Westphalia, first causing damage in the villages of Eickelborn and Benninghausen, where two medical clinic buildings were partially unroofed, a supermarket sustained roof damage, and trees were downed. Continuing to the east, the tornado reached peak intensity as it moved through a rural area, where a brick farm home had much of its roofing removed, and a large and well-built brick farm building was partially destroyed. A smaller outbuilding was completely destroyed, many large trees were snapped and uprooted, and a large masonry-construction church had its steeple torn off in this area as well. Continuing directly into Lippstadt, the tornado weakened, but caused roof damage to many homes, businesses, and a school, and downed numerous trees in the city before dissipating. Some large trees landed on vehicles and buildings, causing considerable damage. The Lippstadt tornado had a path length of 13.4 kilometers (8.3 mi), and did not result in any serious injuries. The second F2 tornado caused major damage as it tore directly through Paderborn. Homes, churches, schools, businesses, and apartment buildings in the city sustained partial to total roof loss, including an apartment building that was unroofed and sustained partial failure of its top-floor exterior walls. An office building, a large furniture store, and a used car business were significantly damaged and had their roofs ripped off, and warehouses were also heavily damaged. Metal light poles were bent to the ground, while cars, trucks, and vehicle trailers were tossed and severely damaged, and other vehicles were damaged by flying debris. Numerous large trees were snapped or uprooted in Paderborn, and streets were left strewn with debris. The Paderborn tornado injured 43 people along its 21.5-kilometer (13.4 mi) long path, including 13 serious injuries.

The third tornado from the supercell, rated high-end F1, struck the towns of Ovenhausen and Lütmarsen, damaging dozens of trees and roofs along its 8.0-kilometer-long (5.0-mile) path, and injuring two people. Many homes sustained heavy roof damage, a soccer field was damaged, and a large industrial building had its roof blown off. Trees were snapped, and outbuildings were damaged or destroyed in rural areas as well. A fourth tornado produced by the supercell, which was rated F2, touched down in a densely forested area near Merxhausen, flattening large swaths of trees, with every tree in the direct path being snapped or uprooted in the most severely affected areas. The strong tornado then struck Merxhausen, where a large house and a masonry building had their roof structures completely destroyed, and a small summer home was also destroyed. Multiple other homes and buildings in town suffered major roof damage, including a few that had significant portions of their roofs torn off. The Merxhausen tornado remained on the ground for 11.2 kilometers (7.0 miles) and reached a peak width of up to 750 meters (820 yards), resulting in one injury. The fifth and final tornado from this supercell received a low-end F1 rating after hitting the town of Langelsheim. Along a 0.8 km (0.50 mi) long path, it caused roof damage to homes and uprooted or snapped trees. A frail brick-built garage partly collapsed as well. Another brief low-end F1 tornado also hit a suburban area in southwestern Herford, causing roof and tree damage along its 0.65 kilomter (0.4 mi) long path. An F1 tornado downed numerous trees in wooded areas near Abtsgmünd, and another rain-wrapped F1 tornado downed additional trees and caused slight roof damage in Hillscheid. A total of 10 tornadoes were confirmed as a result of this outbreak, which resulted in 46 injuries.

=== May 26–27 (Eastern United States) ===
EFU	EF0	EF1	EF2	EF3	EF4	EF5
2	8	8	2	0	0	0

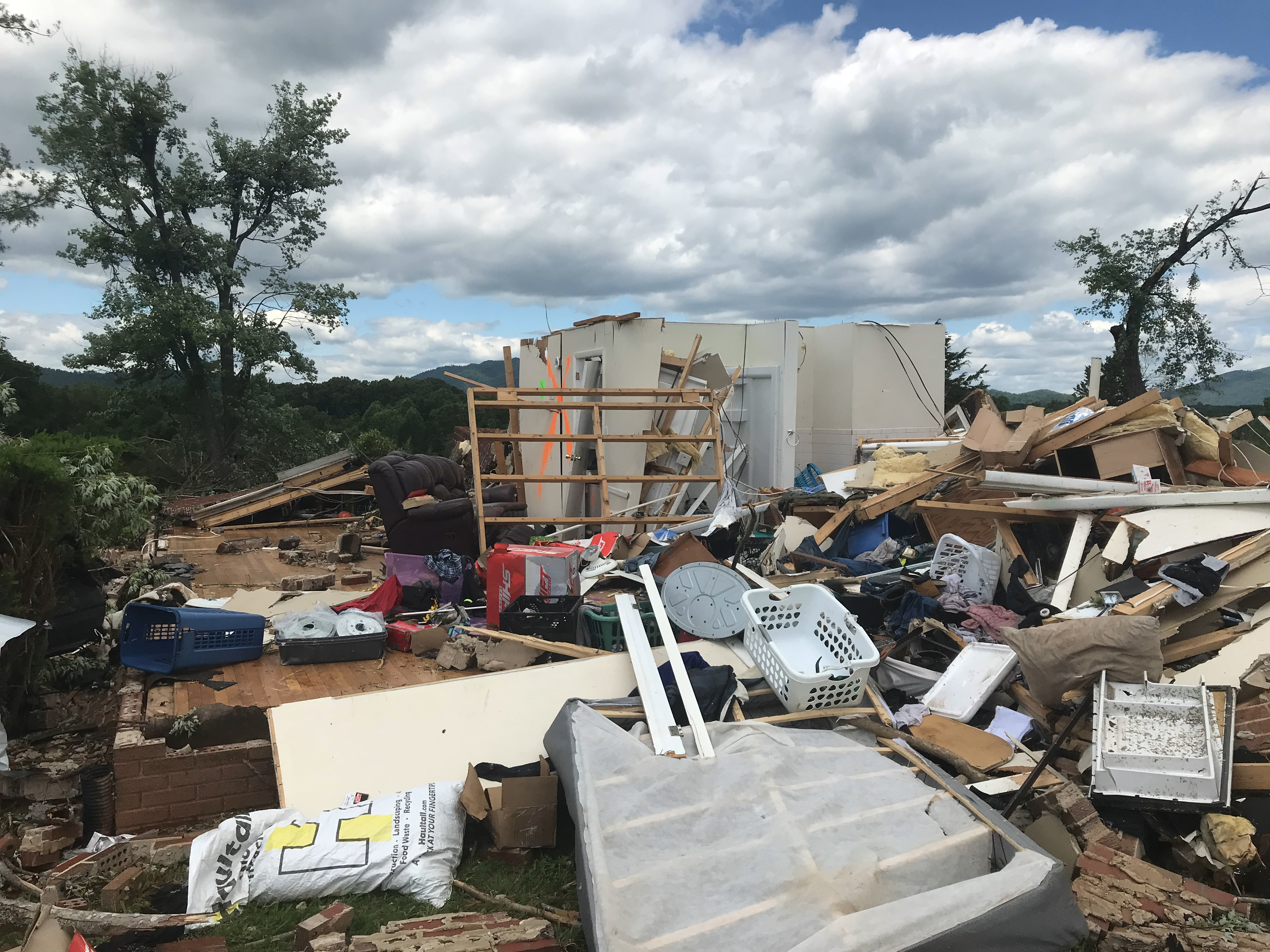
A home that was destroyed at high-end EF2 intensity in Norwood, Virginia.

On May 26, scattered tornadoes occurred in various states across the Eastern United States, most of which were weak. However, a low-end EF2 tornado snapped or uprooted numerous trees near Union Grove, North Carolina, and caused roof damage to a few structures. An EF1 tornado near Greenup, Kentucky, tore a section of roof off a house and destroyed its adjacent garage. Additional tornadoes touched down along the East Coast the following day, including a high-end EF2 tornado that caused significant damage near Norwood, Virginia in Bedford County, destroying a site-built house, two mobile homes, and several outbuildings. The tornado snapped or uprooted numerous trees, and two people were injured. An EF1 tornado touched down in Kirkwood, Pennsylvania, and moved into rural areas outside of town, damaging a house, destroying barns and outbuildings, downing trees, and injuring three people. Another EF1 tornado struck areas in and around Charlotte Hall, Maryland and downed dozens of trees, including some that landed on and caused damage to two homes. As one severe storm passed close to Washington D.C., a Major League Baseball game between the Colorado Rockies and Washington Nationals was postponed. EF0 tornadoes caused minor damage in Olney, Maryland, and Loris, South Carolina. A total of 20 tornadoes were confirmed, along with at least five injuries.

=== May 30 (United States and Canada) ===
EFU	EF0	EF1	EF2	EF3	EF4	EF5
1	3	16	6	1	0	0

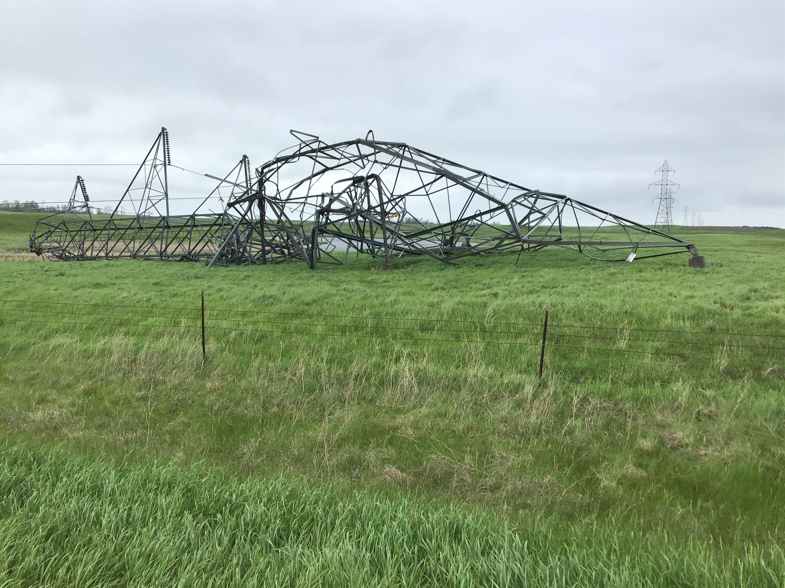
EF3 damage to a metal truss transmission tower near Altamont, South Dakota.

A moderate risk for severe weather was issued by the Storm Prediction Center for much of Minnesota as well as for southeastern North Dakota and eastern South Dakota due to the possibility of intense, long-tracked tornadoes and damaging wind gusts of up to 80 mph (130 km/h). The outlined risk area included a 15% hatched risk for tornadoes. Severe storms were also possible in parts of Kansas, Nebraska, Iowa, and Wisconsin. Early that morning, a severe squall line moved through the Sioux Falls, South Dakota metropolitan area and points east, producing widespread wind damage and five weak tornadoes. One EF1 tornado struck the southern part of Sioux Falls, uprooting trees and causing minor damage to homes. That afternoon, clusters of supercells, multicells, and bowing segments formed and moved northeastward, producing numerous tornadoes. An EF2 tornado near Clear Lake, South Dakota, snapped trees and power poles, destroyed silos and outbuildings, damaged the roof of a house, and tossed grain bins and farm implements.

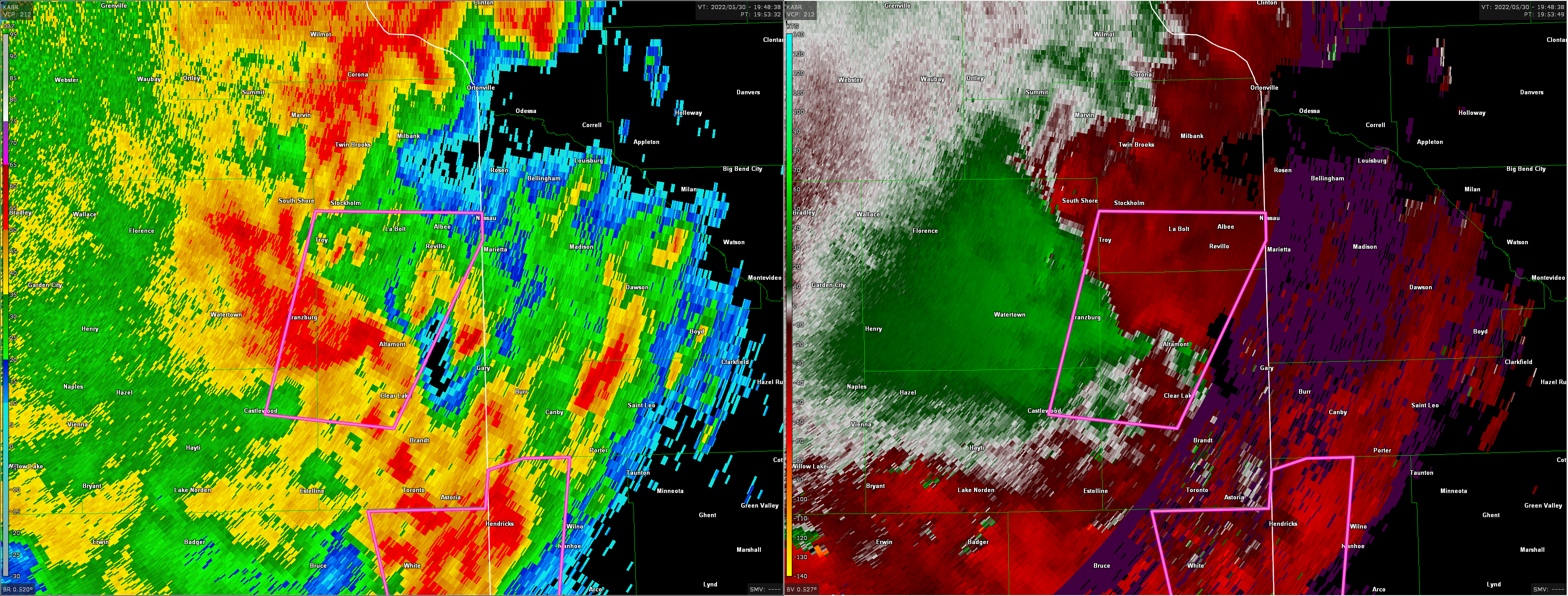
NEXRAD radar image of the Altamont, South Dakota EF3 tornado as it was near peak intensity.

Just to the northwest, an EF3 tornado near Altamont destroyed outbuildings threw a grain bin 1 mi (1.6 km) from where it originated. The strong tornado also toppled and mangled metal truss transmission towers and ripped the roof off a house. Two other EF2 tornadoes passed near Elbow Lake, Minnesota, snapping wooden power poles and trees, and damaging or destroying grain bins and outbuildings. A strong multi-vortex EF2 tornado caused major damage to homes in Forada, some of which had roofs and exterior walls ripped off. Vehicles were tossed, and numerous large trees were snapped in town before the tornado weakened and hit Nelson, causing less severe damage to trees and structures there. Another EF2 tornado that touched down near Aldrich ripped the roof off a cabin and collapsed one of its exterior walls, snapped trees and power poles, and flipped pivot irrigation systems. Numerous other weaker tornadoes also touched down across South Dakota and Minnesota that afternoon and evening as well, including an EF1 tornado that damaged businesses and a baseball field in Deer River. Farther north in Canada, an (C)EF2 (Note: Canada uses a different version of the Enhanced Fujita scale, which is still commonly called the "EF-scale". The Canadian version of the scale is officially known as the "Canadian Enhanced Fujita scale" or "CEF-scale".) tornado moved through remote forested areas near Boffin Lake in southwestern Ontario, snapping and uprooting numerous trees along its path. Large hail and straight-line winds from the severe storms also caused considerable damage. In all, 27 tornadoes were confirmed, none of which resulted in any fatalities.

== June ==
=== June 10–11 (China) ===
EFU	EF0	EF1	EF2	EF3	EF4	EF5
2	0	0	0	0	0	0

A significant cone-shaped tornado touched down in rural Inner Mongolia, inflicting major structural damage to multiple brick homes. Trees were also snapped, some of which sustained low-end debarking, and concrete telephone poles were downed. A narrow rope tornado was also photographed in the area as well and caused no known damage. Neither tornado was officially rated.

=== June 14–15 (United States) ===
EFU	EF0	EF1	EF2	EF3	EF4	EF5
0	3	11	3	0	0	0

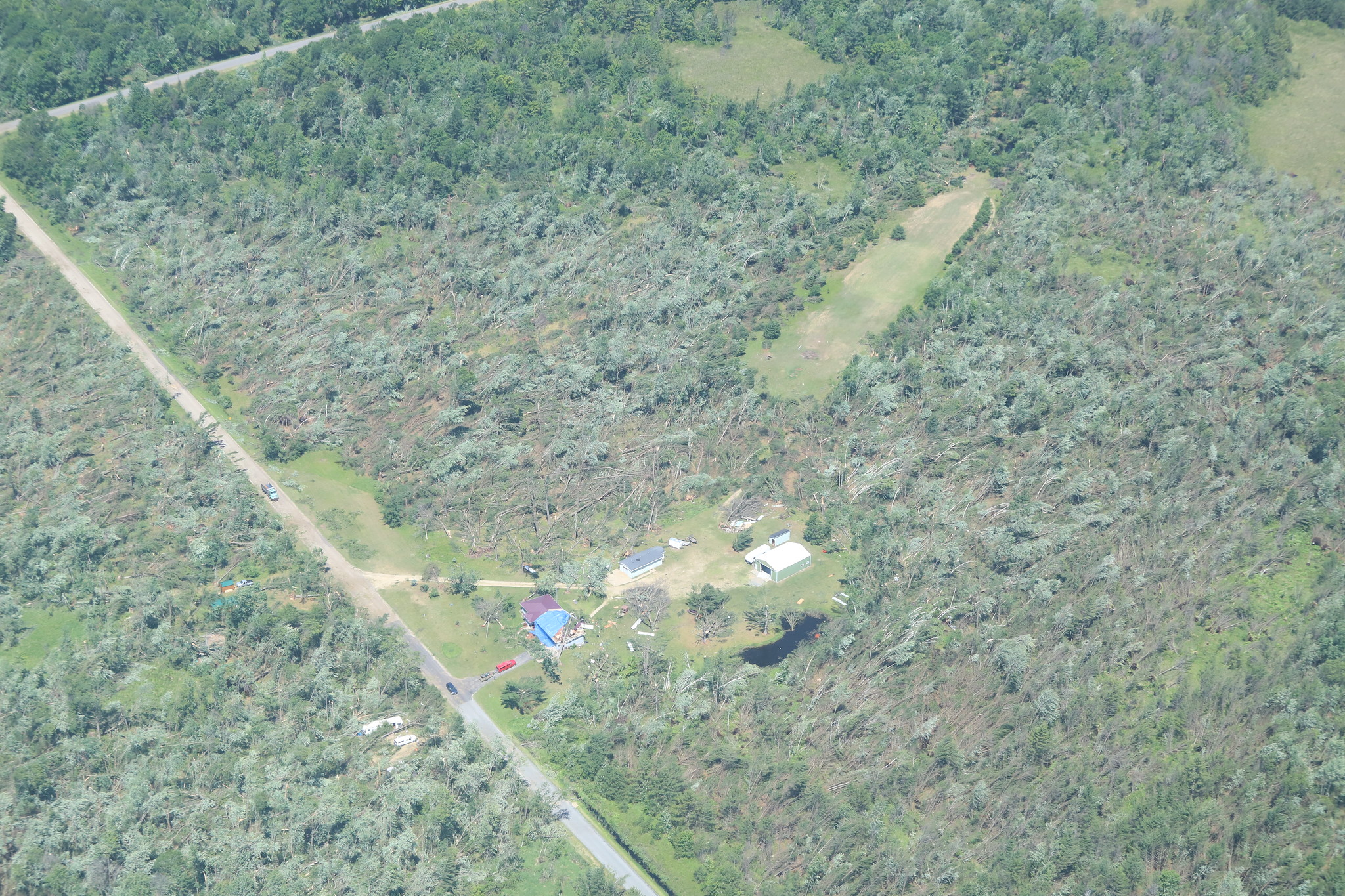
Trees flattened by a low-end EF2 tornado near Silver Cliff, Wisconsin.

On June 14, widespread severe thunderstorms affected the northern Great Plains, producing hail and damaging winds, along with a few tornadoes. An EF1 tornado caused damage to a house, a church, grain bins, and some power poles near Murdock, Nebraska. Near Treynor, Iowa, an EF0 tornado struck and destroyed a frail event center building at a winery. The city of York and the village of Waco in Nebraska, sustained $90 million in damage from a hailstorm caused by the storm system. Early morning on June 15, an EF2 tornado struck Lushton, Nebraska, causing extensive tree damage and destroying grain bins in and around town. A house had its garage ripped off outside of town, and multiple outbuildings were also destroyed. Two people were injured. Later that day, the Storm Prediction Center issued a moderate risk for severe weather for much of southern Wisconsin, including a 15% hatched risk area for tornadoes. Large hail and straight-line winds were expected as well, and multiple clusters of severe thunderstorms grew upscale into a large MCS with multiple embedded supercells and circulations. A strong EF2 tornado passed near Wyeville and Oakdale, snapping thousands of trees and many power poles, destroying a modular home and some outbuildings, and tearing the roof off a manufactured home, injuring two people. Another low-end EF2 tornado flattened a large swath of trees in Silver Cliff, where the local fire station was severely damaged and multiple outbuildings were destroyed. In Mauston, an EF1 tornado inflicted considerable roof damage to a restaurant and an apartment building, and downed power lines and trees in town. Another EF0 tornado downed trees and power poles, damaged or destroyed barns, outbuildings, and silos, and also clipped the south edge of Seymour, where an apartment complex had roof damage. An EF0 tornado also caused minor tree, fence, and structure damage in Madison, Kansas. A total of 20 tornadoes were confirmed.

=== June 16 (China) ===
An EF2 tornado struck the large city of Guangzhou, China on the evening of June 16. Businesses and residential structures sustained considerable damage to their windows, roofs, and exteriors, and trees and power lines were downed. Vehicles were moved and damaged, and some metal buildings were severely damaged or destroyed, with sheet metal wrapped around power lines. The tornado caused major power outages and knocked out power to the city's subway lines. No serious injuries or fatalities occurred.

=== June 19 (Utah) ===
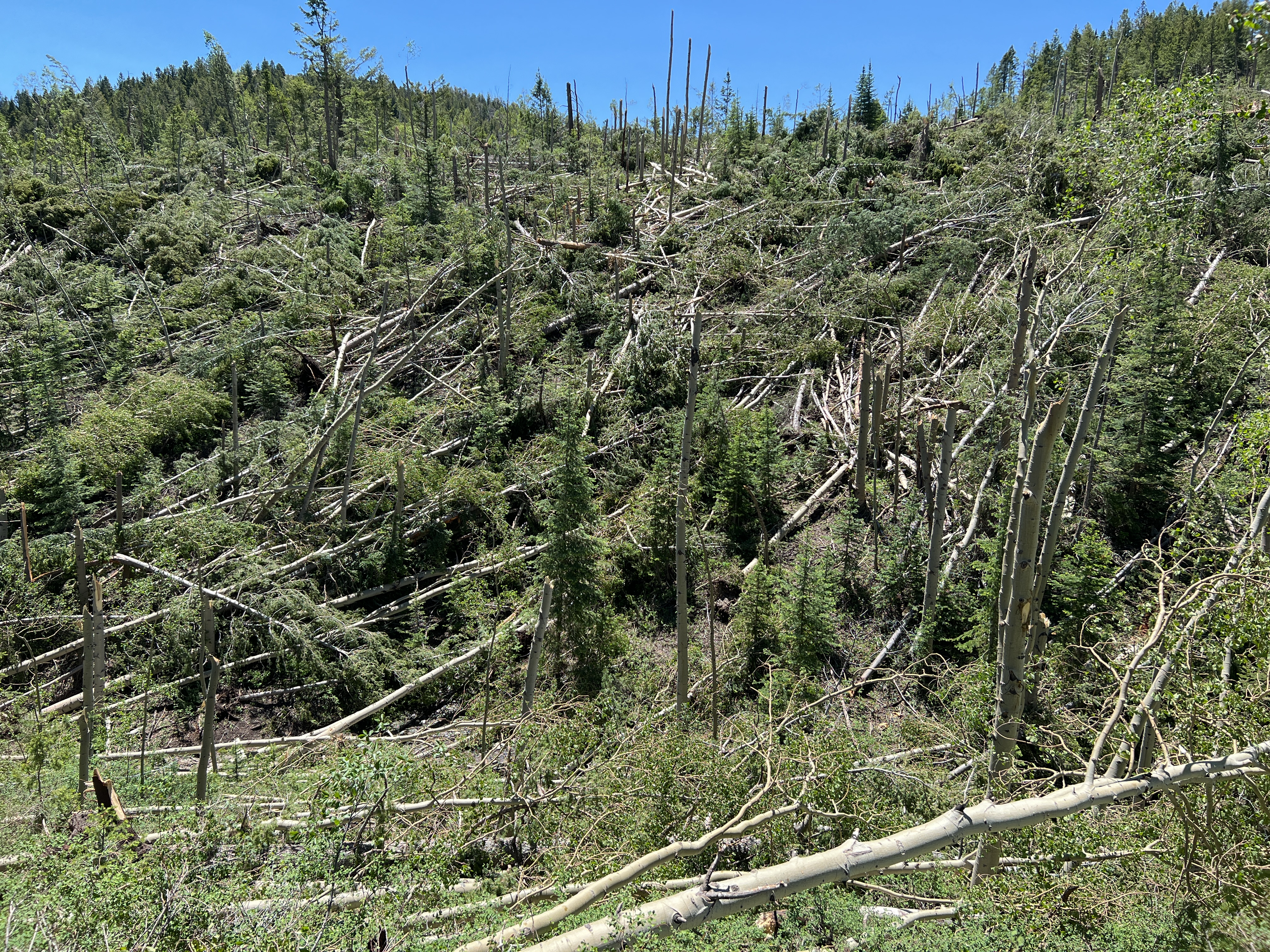
EF2 damage to trees in Indian Canyon.

An extremely rare EF2 tornado struck remote southwestern Duchesne County, Utah, causing damage primarily to trees during the late morning of June 19, developing near U.S. Route 191 north of the ghost town of Castle Gate. The tornado reached an estimated maximum path width of approximately 0.5 miles (0.80 km) and produced its most significant damage in Indian Canyon, where extensive tree damage occurred with peak winds estimated at 125 mph (201 km/h). Almost all trees along a large hillside were downed, and additional severe tree damage was observed immediately north of U.S. Route 191, where numerous trees were snapped or uprooted. The tornado was on the ground for 4 minutes, traveling 2.08 miles (3.34 km). This was the first F/EF2 tornado documented in Utah in nearly 20 years. No injuries or fatalities were confirmed.

=== June 27 (Netherlands) ===
A fatal IF1/F1/T2 tornado touched down and caused considerable damage in the town of Zierikzee in the Netherlands. Homes sustained roof damage, and several adjoining townhomes were unroofed entirely. Trees and fences were toppled to the ground, and cars were damaged by flying debris. The fatality occurred when an elderly woman who was caught outside during the tornado was struck by flying debris. Nine other people were injured in Zierikzee.

== July ==
=== July 6 (Ohio) ===
EFU	EF0	EF1	EF2	EF3	EF4	EF5
0	0	2	1	0	0	0

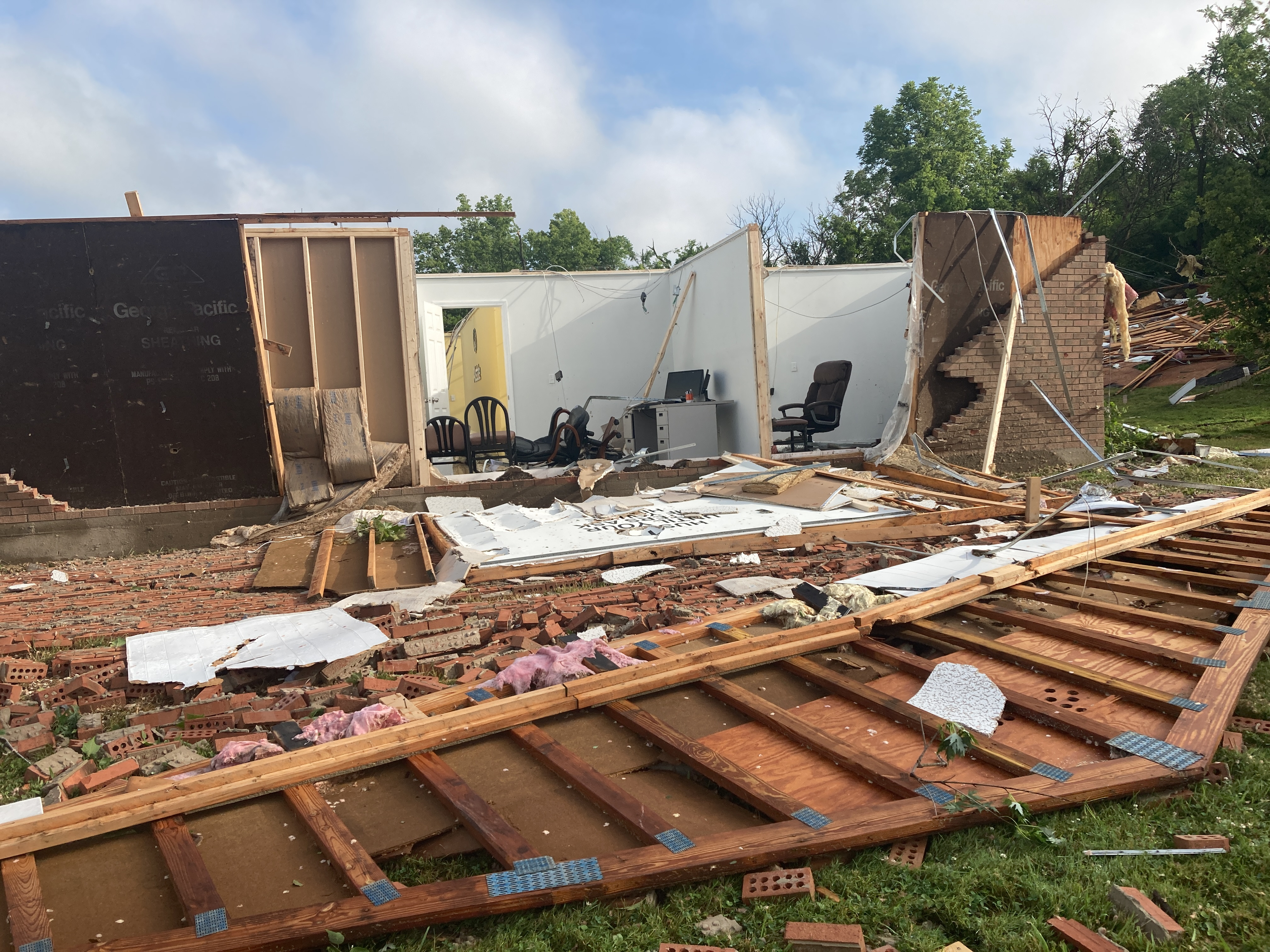
High-end EF2 damage to an insurance business in Goshen, Ohio.

On the afternoon of July 6, a damaging high-end EF2 tornado struck the town of Goshen, Ohio, and caused significant damage to structures, injuring two people. Numerous homes were damaged in town, and several had their roofs torn off. An insurance business and an office building sustained total roof loss and collapse of their exterior walls, the local fire station was significantly damaged, and vehicles were damaged by flying debris. Many large trees and several power poles were snapped, and outbuildings were destroyed in and around Goshen as well. An EF1 tornado also struck Loveland, where many trees were downed, and damage to roofs, siding, and fences occurred. Another EF1 tornado damaged some homes and snapped or uprooted trees near Fayetteville and Edenton, including a few trees that landed on houses and vehicles. The tornadoes were produced by a thunderstorm interacting with an outflow boundary and were largely unexpected, forming in an area where no tornado risk had been outlined by the Storm Prediction Center. This tornado family caused $3.6 million (2022 USD) in damage according to the National Centers for Environmental Information.

=== July 7–8 (Canada) ===
EFU	EF0	EF1	EF2	EF3	EF4	EF5
0	2	0	3	0	0	0

On July 7, a strong EF2 tornado passed through rural areas between Bergen and Sundre, Alberta, injuring one person. A few homes sustained significant damage, and several barns, garages, and outbuildings were destroyed, with debris scattered across the ground. Numerous large trees were snapped or uprooted as the tornado moved through wooded areas, an RV and some vehicle trailers were tossed, and power poles were also snapped. Two additional EF2 tornadoes occurred in Saskatchewan on the following day, one of which caused major tree damage near Paynton, while the other destroyed outbuildings, snapped trees, and knocked over or threw grain bins near Blaine Lake. Two EF0 tornadoes also briefly touched down near Bresaylor, neither of which caused any damage. A total of 5 tornadoes were confirmed.

=== July 18 (United States and Canada) ===
EFU	EF0	EF1	EF2	EF3	EF4	EF5
1	1	2	2	0	0	0

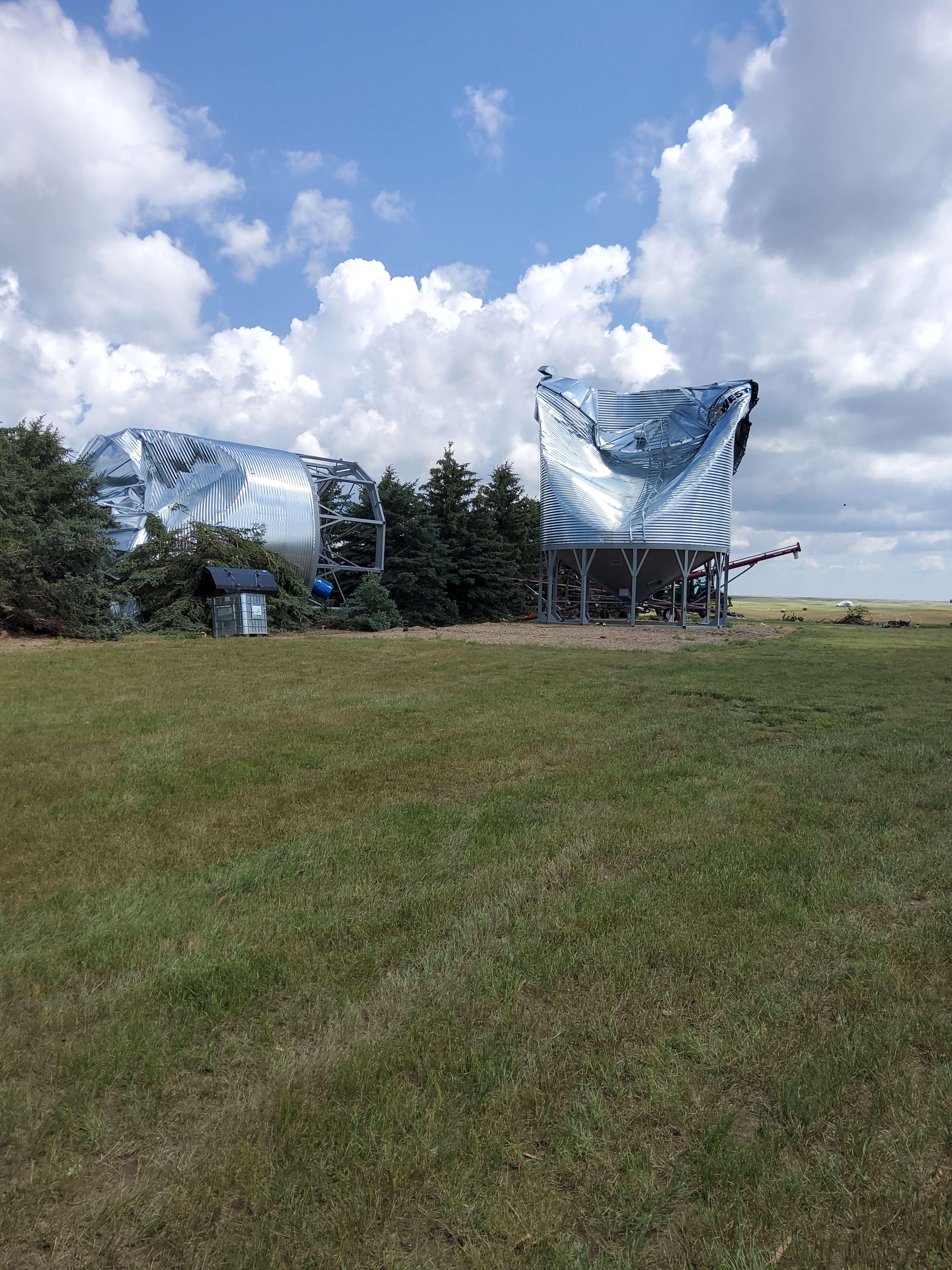
Heavily damaged or destroyed grain bins in Glentana, Montana due to an EF2 tornado.

An EF2 tornado struck the small town of Glentana, Montana, resulting in extensive damage. A house and another structure sustained roof loss, while storage buildings, garages, pole barns, and grain bins were destroyed. A large truck and some storage tanks were knocked over, farming equipment was damaged, power poles were snapped, and trees were downed as well. In Canada, another EF2 tornado hit areas in and around Redcliff, Alberta, located to the west of Medicine Hat. The most significant damage was inflicted to farmsteads and homes outside of town, where a house had its roof torn off, another house had its attached garage destroyed, and multiple other homes suffered extensive roof and window damage. Barns, farm buildings, garages, metal grain silos, and sheds were completely destroyed as well, with debris scattered long distances across fields. Farm animals were killed, RV campers and several semi-trailers were rolled, while farming equipment and irrigation pivots were damaged. The tornado weakened as it struck Redcliff before dissipating, where homes sustained minor damage, a metal building had its roof peeled back, the fabric covering of a salt storage facility was torn, and signs and fences were downed. Numerous trees and power poles were snapped along the path.

Farther east, conditions favored development of supercells over the Northeastern United States. One storm produced a very brief, but well-documented EFU tornado on the Hudson River near Port Ewen, New York. Another storm produced a brief EF1 tornado that snapped trees and collapsed a barn in Addison, Vermont. The same storm also dropped a brief EF0 tornado that caused minor tree damage southwest of Vergennes. Another storm produced a brief EF1 tornado that snapped trees and destroyed some outbuildings near Chesterfield, New Hampshire. The storms that produced the northeast tornadoes also produced torrential rainfall in the New York Metropolitan Area, triggering sinkholes, and the rainfall total in Tarrytown, New York, was 4.79 inches (122 mm). New York City set a daily record for precipitation, at 1.85 inches (47 mm). Several people had to be rescued from their cars due to flooding in the parking lot of the Garden State Plaza. In addition, parts of the New York City Subway shut down due to flooding. Overall, a total of six tornadoes were confirmed.

=== July 20 (China) ===
EFU	EF0	EF1	EF2	EF3	EF4	EF5
0	0	2	1	1	0	0

On the afternoon of July 20, multiple supercell thunderstorms developed in Jiangsu Province, resulting in multiple destructive tornadoes, numerous injuries, and three fatalities. One tornado caused damage in Huaiyin, and was rated EF1. A strong EF2 wedge tornado impacted Guanyun County, where numerous brick homes were damaged or destroyed in and around the Tangqiao and Xiaomao areas. Significant damage to trees and crops occurred, and numerous parked motorcycles were thrown and scattered long distances across a field, one of which was found mangled and completely wrapped around the trunk of a tree. Two people were killed and at least 649 homes were either damaged or destroyed by the Guanyun County tornado. The strongest tornado of the day was rated EF3 and moved through areas near Lianyungang in Xiangshui County, damaging or destroying brick homes and other buildings, toppling several metal truss electrical transmission towers to the ground, killing one person, and injuring multiple others. An EF1 tornado also struck Suqian in Shuyang County, resulting in considerable damage to industrial buildings and homes. A total of four tornadoes were confirmed. In addition to the three fatalities, at least 26 people were injured.

=== July 22–23 (China) ===
EFU	EF0	EF1	EF2	EF3	EF4	EF5
1	0	0	0	1	0	0

A rain-wrapped EF3 tornado struck the city of Shangqiu, Henan Province, China on the afternoon of July 22, heavily damaging factories, tossing vehicles, and downing trees and power lines. Numerous homes and large brick residential structures were damaged, some had their roofs torn off, and a few sustained collapse of their top floor exterior walls. Crops were damaged in fields, metal truss transmission towers were blown over, and several people were injured. The next day, a tornado was successfully chased and recorded for the first time by Chinese native storm chasers and severe weather researchers near Bayannur, Northern China. The researchers were able to collect valuable scientific data while the tornado was on the ground. The tornado occurred in a remote, unpopulated area, and no known damage occurred. However, official reports did not include this tornado.

=== July 23–24 (Canada) ===
EFU	EF0	EF1	EF2	EF3	EF4	EF5
0	1	2	2	0	0	0

At around 6 pm EST on the evening of July 23, an EF2 tornado passed through sections of the municipalities of St.Adolphe-d'Howard and St-Agathe-des-Monts, in the Laurentides region of Quebec. Countless large trees were snapped or uprooted as the tornado moved through densely forested areas, power poles were snapped, garages were damaged or destroyed, and multiple homes suffered heavy roof damage. One house had its roof removed entirely, also sustaining partial exterior wall failure. Two other tornadoes, which were rated EF1 and EF0, were also confirmed in the area, both of which caused relatively minor tree damage. The next day, another EF2 tornado caused significant tree and structural damage in central-eastern Ontario along the Highway 7 corridor. The tornado passed near Madoc and Tweed before striking the small community of Actinolite, where multiple homes had extensive roof and siding damage, and one house had most of its roof torn off. A church in town had its steeple blown off, while some small cabins and sheds were destroyed. Wide swaths of trees were flattened as the tornado moved through remote forested areas elsewhere along the path, and large barns and outbuildings were completely destroyed. An RV trailer was overturned, and a pickup truck was thrown 25 meters (82 feet), resulting in multiple injuries. Maximum wind speeds from this tornado were estimated at 190 km/h. An EF1 tornado that caused tree damage occurred near Parham as well. A total of five tornadoes were confirmed.

== August ==
=== August 17 (Paraguay) ===
A damaging stovepipe tornado was caught on video from multiple angles as it caused severe damage in the San Joaquín, Paraguay area on August 17. Homes were damaged by the tornado, and a few were largely destroyed, sustaining total roof loss and collapse of their exterior walls. Crop damage occurred, trees were downed, and outbuildings were destroyed as well. Numerous farm animals, including cows, pigs, and chickens were killed by the tornado. At least 5 people were injured.

== September ==
=== September 17 (Italy) ===
FU	F0	F1	F2	F3	F4	F5
0	3	1	0	0	0	0

On September 17, a small tornado/waterspout outbreak affected Italy. An F0 tornado touched down in Fano around 9:25 UTC, causing minor tree damage and overturning a truck. Two people were injured by this tornado. Over the next hour, three waterspouts occurred. Around 12:25 UTC, a waterspout came ashore in Tortora, causing F0 damage to a beach facility. Minutes later, around 12:35 UTC, another waterspout came ashore in Tortora, destroying another beach facility at F1 intensity. The same tornado also damaged and moved cars, snapped or uprooted trees, destroyed benches, and caused roof damage to structures. Ten minutes after the F1 tornado, another waterspout came ashore in Praia a Mare and caused F0 level damage to beach signs and a beach facility, as well as downing a tree and damaging a roof. A total of four tornadoes were confirmed.

=== September 18–19 (Ukraine and Russia) ===
FU	F0	F1	F2	F3	F4	F5
1	0	3	3	1	0	0

On September 18, severe supercell thunderstorms produced a small outbreak of strong tornadoes in Ukraine and Russia, resulting in significant damage and multiple fatalities. The first and strongest tornado of the event produced F3 damage as it tore through Buryn', Ukraine. Numerous houses and apartment buildings in town sustained major structural damage, some of which sustained total loss of their roofs and exterior walls. Many trees in Buryn' were snapped and denuded, cars were tossed, and metal railroad pylons were blown over. One person was killed in Buryn', and eight others were injured. An F2 tornado unroofed homes in and around the small village of Zinovo, Ukraine, snapped numerous large trees, and damaged power line pylons. An F1 tornado struck Shurovo, Ukraine and another F1 tornado impacted Ol'govka, Russia. Both tornadoes caused severe damage to poorly built homes and downed many trees and power lines. Another tornado damaged or destroyed roughly 200 structures in the L'gov area, and was rated F2. Later that evening, an F1 tornado struck Kursk, tearing roofs off of dormitory buildings at a local college, scattering debris, and downing trees. A student inside one dormitory was killed by flying debris, and another fatality occurred as a result of a falling tree. On September 19, an F2 tornado moved through a forest near Svecha, flattening a large swath of trees. At least eight tornadoes and three fatalities occurred as a result of this outbreak, though additional tornadoes are suspected to have occurred, but were never confirmed.

=== September 27–30 (Hurricane Ian) ===
EFU	EF0	EF1	EF2	EF3	EF4	EF5
4	8	3	1	0	0	0

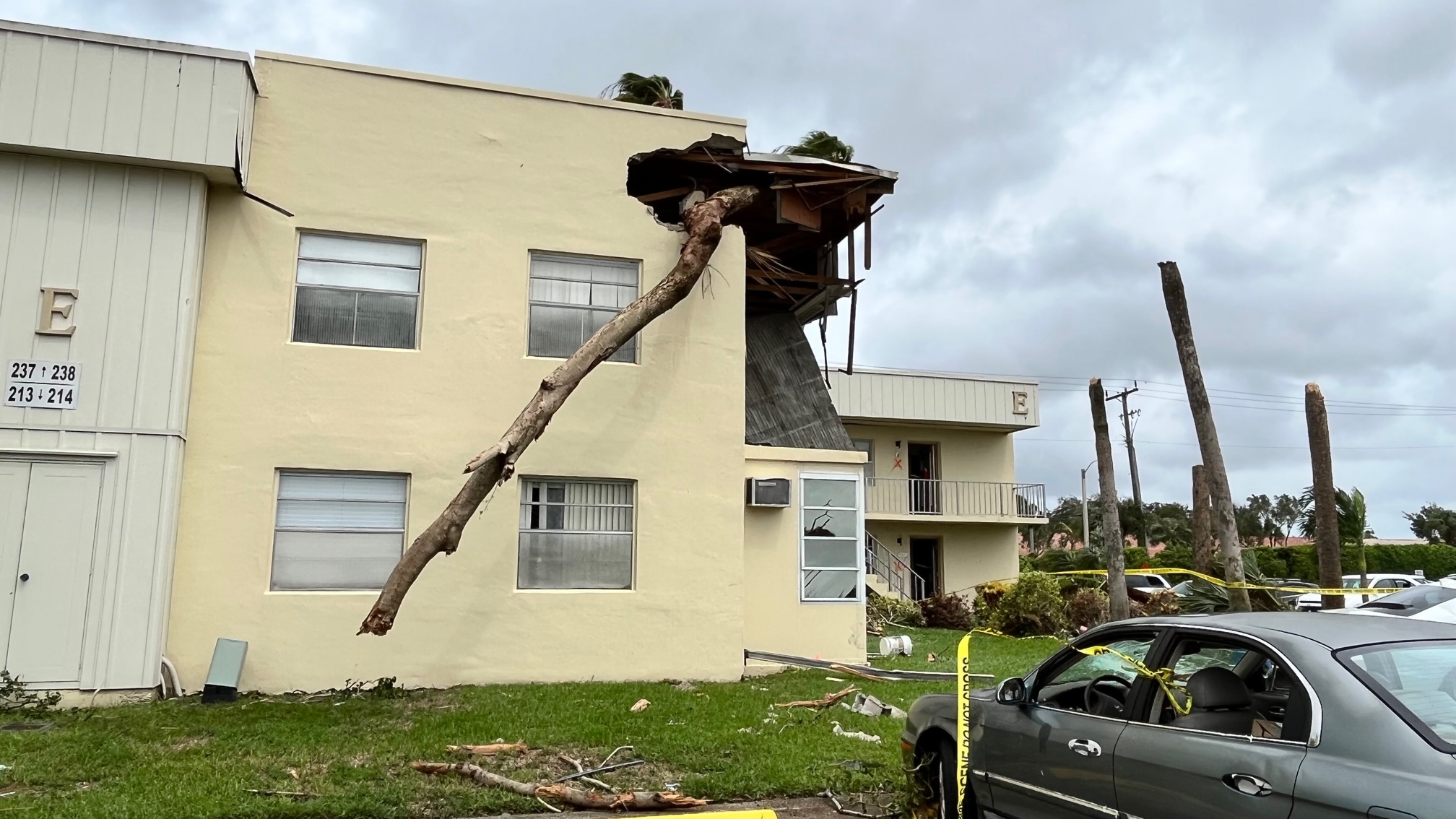
High-end EF2 damage to an apartment building and trees in Kings Point, Florida.

Several tornadoes spawned by Hurricane Ian caused damage across Florida in late September. A high-end EF2 tornado impacted Florida Atlantic University in Boca Raton, where buildings had siding damage. The most intense damage occurred farther along the path in Kings Point, where apartment buildings had their roofs torn off, homes sustained roof damage and shattered windows, palm trees were snapped, and cars were flipped and severely damaged. Two people were injured in Kings Point when the tornado collapsed a roof. In Pembroke Pines, an EF1 tornado hit North Perry Airport, causing significant damage to airplanes and hangars. Another EF1 tornado caused damage to roofs and downed tree branches at a golf course in the Wellington area. An EF0 tornado inflicted minor roof and siding damage to homes in Holden Beach, North Carolina, as well. A total of 16 tornadoes were confirmed.

== October ==
=== October 23 (Europe) ===
IFU	IF0	IF0.5	IF1	IF1.5	IF2	IF2.5	IF3	IF4	IF5	Total
0	0	2	4	4	2	1	1	0	0	14

As severe thunderstorms and supercells spawned by Storm Beatrice moved across Northern France and Southern England, a total of 11 tornadoes were produced, a few of which were strong and caused major damage. In England, a low-end F2 tornado impacted the New Milton area, damaging the roofs of homes and snapping large tree trunks. An F1 tornado in Colden Common came close to the Marwell Zoo, downing trees and signs in the zoo's car park, and destroying some outbuildings. An F1 tornado also downed trees and damaged the roofs of homes in Welling, while two other F1 tornadoes were confirmed in Hurstbourne Priors and Up Somebourne. Six tornadoes touched down in France, including an F2 tornado that struck Beuzeville, where severe damage to homes occurred and semi-trucks were thrown into a pile. Another F2 tornado impacted Songeons, damaging industrial buildings, tearing roofing from homes and businesses, and destroying large outbuilding structures. The most significant event of the outbreak was a very long-tracked EF3/F3/T6/IF3 tornado, which became the longest-tracked tornado in the history of France, remaining on the ground for 206 km (128 mi). The tornado caused severe damage in multiple towns, with the most intense damage occurring in Bihucourt, where well-built brick homes and other buildings sustained total loss of their roofs and exterior walls, cars were tossed, and debris was scattered throughout the community. The tornado eventually crossed into Belgium, causing tree and roof damage in a few villages before dissipating. A few F1 tornadoes also caused considerable damage in the towns of Ferrières-en-Bray, Gaudechart, and Beaudéduit.

== November ==
=== November 4–5 (United States) ===
EFU	EF0	EF1	EF2	EF3	EF4	EF5
1	4	15	7	2	2	0

A radar image of tornadic supercells on November 4.

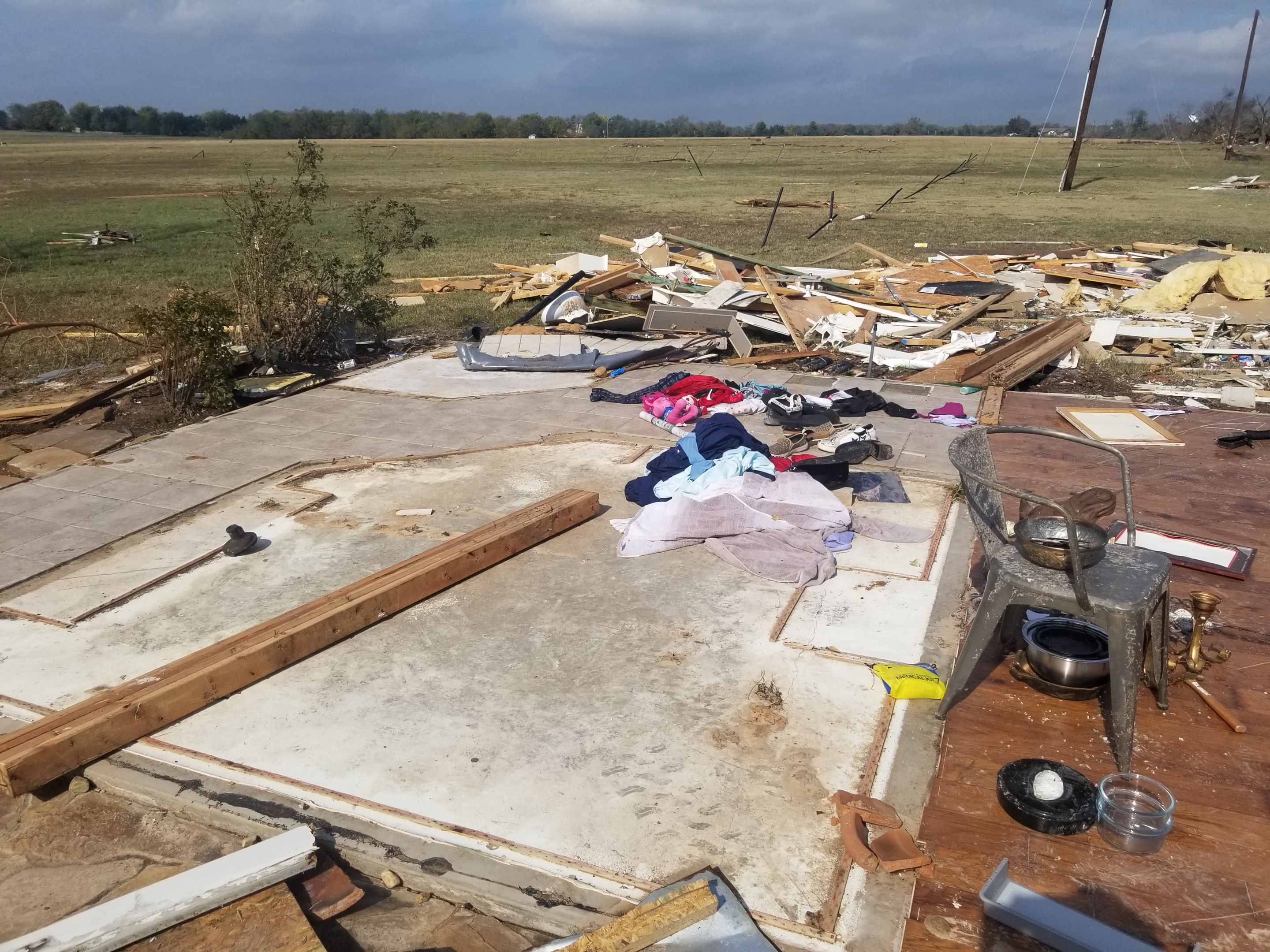
Low-end EF4 damage to a home in Caviness, Texas.

On November 4, an outbreak of strong to violent tornadoes took place in Northeast Texas, southwestern Arkansas, southeastern Oklahoma, and northwestern Louisiana, with multiple large and destructive tornadoes being confirmed. The outbreak was spawned by a potent upper-level trough, which interacted with a highly unstable and moist environment in place across the ArkLaTex region. The Storm Prediction Center forecasted an environment that would be favorable for long-lived supercells and tornadoes, with the potential for strong tornadoes noted. That afternoon, a moderate risk was issued for the threat area, including 15% hatched risk area for tornadoes. During the late afternoon and evening, multiple tornadic supercells formed in East Texas before they moved northeast into Oklahoma and Arkansas, producing multiple long-tracked significant tornadoes. The first tornado of day the produced EF1 damage to mobile homes, houses, and trees in and around Calera, Oklahoma. Near the town of Powderly, Texas, a nearly mile-wide EF4 wedge tornado leveled and swept homes from their foundations as it moved through the rural community of Caviness, injuring one person and destroying some additional homes in Midcity. A narrow but strong EF2 tornado caused significant damage to a couple of homes near Sulphur Springs and was documented by numerous storm chasers. A rain-wrapped EF2 tornado also struck Athens, where houses and a large metal warehouse structure were damaged, while another EF2 destroyed a chicken house and a mobile home near Pickens, Oklahoma, resulting in a fatality and an injury. A violent and long-tracked EF4 tornado debarked trees, tossed cars, and destroyed houses near Clarksville, Texas, including one that was swept clean from its foundation. The tornado crossed into Oklahoma and impacted the town of Idabel, where many homes and businesses were damaged or destroyed, and several people were injured. An EF3 tornado near Cason, Texas, killed one person, injured eight others, completely destroyed multiple homes and mobile homes, knocked over metal truss transmission towers, and caused major tree damage. Another large EF3 tornado severely damaged or destroyed a number of homes, businesses, and outbuildings as it passed near the towns of Simms and New Boston. An EF2 tornado heavily damaged homes in and around Hughes Springs, where a fire station was also damaged, and numerous large trees were snapped or uprooted in and around town. In Arkansas, a mobile home, a free-standing tower, and some outbuildings were destroyed by an EF2 tornado near Center Point, while another brief EF2 destroyed a barn and downed many trees in the Kirby area. EF1 tornadoes also caused moderate damage in the towns of Mansfield and Green Forest. Later that night, a brief but strong EF2 tornado touched down near Sardis, tearing roofs off of a few homes and causing significant tree damage. On November 5, the storm system produced numerous reports of damaging straight-line winds in southern Wisconsin and northern Illinois, and an EF0 tornado caused minor damage to trees, power lines, and a barn near Big Rock. A third non-tornadic fatality occurred in Stilwell, Oklahoma, from drowning. This marked the first time since the 1997 Central Texas tornado outbreak that more than one violent tornado (EF4-EF5) occurred in Texas on the same day. Two fatalities and a total of 31 tornadoes were confirmed as a result of this outbreak.

=== November 17 (Australia) ===
In 2024, a caver discovered on Google Earth an 11-kilometre (6.8 mile) vegetation-stripped track on the Nullarbor Plain, ranging between 160 and 250 metres (175 and 273 yards) wide; it straddles the border of South and Western Australia, about 120 km (74.5 miles) north of Eucla. Word eventually reached Dr. Matej Lipar, a physical geographer from the Slovenian Academy of Sciences and Arts, who then authored a study in the Journal of Southern Hemisphere Earth Systems Science. Evidence suggests wind speeds of faster than 100 kilometres per hour (62 miles per hour) – possibly more than 200kph (124 mph). This would put it at F2 or F3 on the six-category Fujita scale for measuring tornadoes. However, John Allen, a meteorologist at Central Michigan University who was not involved in the study, said it was a leap to assign an intensity estimate on the tornado without damage indicators, such as damage to buildings, which are more robust than desert scrub.

=== November 17 (Europe) ===
FU	F0	F1	F2	F3	F4	F5
1	0	0	1	0	0	0

At around 12:15 UTC, an unrated tornado struck the community of Suippes dans la Marne in northeastern France, causing roof damage to about 50 houses. A fire station in town was also damaged, a trampoline was thrown, and trees were downed as well. Later that day at around 13:45 UTC, a supercell thunderstorm produced an unusually strong tornado for November in northern Saarland in Germany. It remained on the ground for at least 10.9 kilometres (6.8 mi) and crossed the Autobahn 1 shortly after it touched down. The tornado first hit the village of Dirmingen, where trees and power poles were snapped, and damage patterns indicated a multiple-vortex structure. The most significant damage occurred in the neighboring town of Urexweiler, where at least 25 houses sustained damage, and a few had large sections of their roofs torn off. Trees were downed, metal power pylons were damaged, vehicles were damaged by flying debris, and carports were destroyed in town. Streets in Urexweiler were left littered with broken roof tiles, and severe tree damage occurred in forested areas outside of town, where numerous large trees were snapped. Both Thomas Sävert, a German meteorologist and tornado expert, as well as the European Severe Storms Laboratory (ESSL), rated the tornado an F2, with the ESSL also assigning it a T4 rating. No known injuries occurred as a result of the tornadoes.

=== November 29–30 (United States) ===
EFU	EF0	EF1	EF2	EF3	EF4	EF5
4	7	9	5	2	0	0

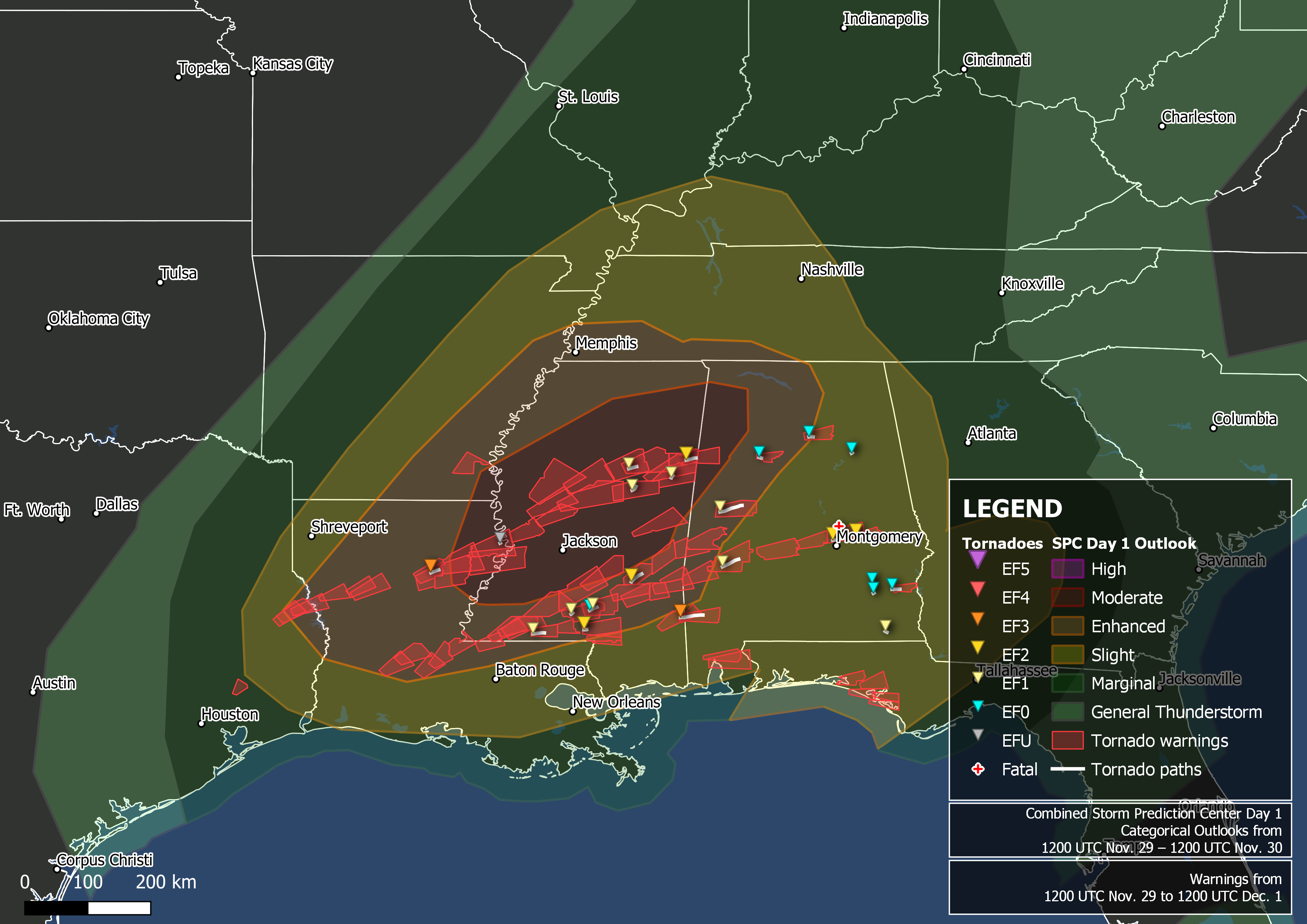
Composite of tornado warnings and confirmed tornadoes on November 29–30, 2022.

A relatively small outbreak of tornadoes, some of which were strong to intense, took place in the Dixie Alley region, with tornadoes being confirmed in Louisiana, Mississippi, and Alabama. The Storm Prediction Center forecasted an environment that would be favorable for long-tracked supercells and tornadoes, with the potential for long-tracked EF3+ tornadoes noted. A day before the event, a moderate risk was issued for the threat area for a 15% hatched risk area for tornadoes. A day later, the moderate risk was extended to include north-western Alabama, northeast Louisiana, southeast Arkansas, and most of Mississippi. The first intense tornado of the day, which was rated EF3, injured one person near Clarks, Louisiana, along with debarking trees and deeply scouring the ground. Another strong tornado caused severe damage near the community of Wells, Mississippi, earning a high-end EF2 rating. Another EF2 tornado near Stringer significantly damaged a well-built brick home, obliterated a shed, and snapped or uprooted many trees. The second intense tornado of the outbreak touched down near State Line producing weak tree damage. It crossed into Alabama, hitting the community of Fruitdale and damaging Fruitdale High School before passing near the small community of Tibbie, where low-end EF3 tree damage was observed. Soon after, another EF2 tornado touched down just north of Montgomery, Alabama, hitting the communities of Flatwood and Willow Springs, damaging or destroying mobile homes, houses, and a community center building. Two people were killed when an uprooted tree fell on a mobile home. Several other weaker tornadoes touched down across Mississippi and Alabama, earning EF0 or EF1 ratings, including a high-end EF1 tornado that caused considerable damage in Eutaw, Alabama. A total of 27 tornadoes and two fatalities occurred as a result of this outbreak.

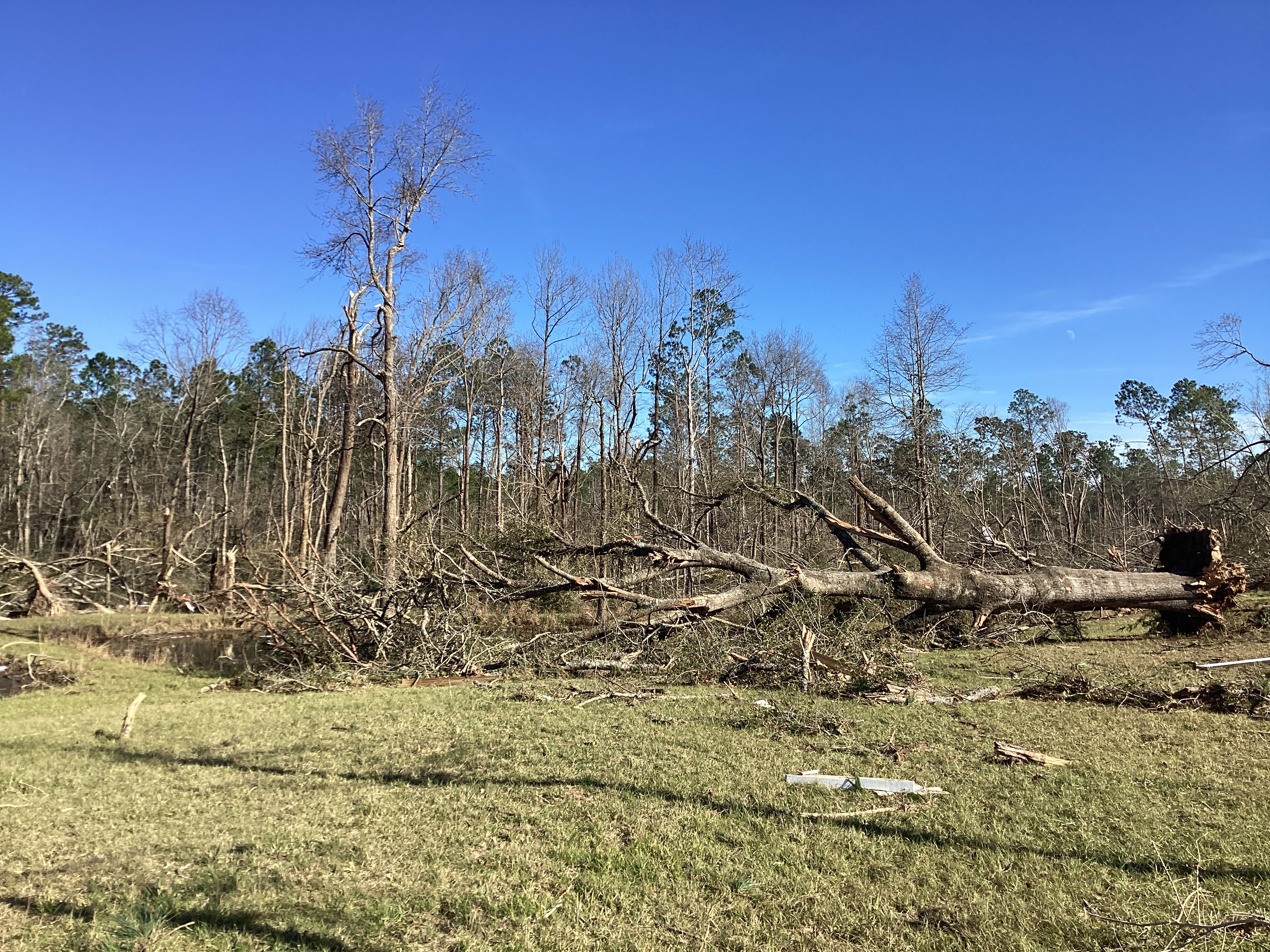
Low-end EF3 tree damage near the small community of Tibbie, Alabama.

Schools in each affected state canceled/postponed classes or closed early. Northwestern State University campuses in Louisiana also closed early and postponed or canceled classes. Multiple Mississippi school districts closed early on November 29 in anticipation of the inclement weather, including those of Claiborne, Copiah, Lawrence, and Madison counties. Shelton State Community College in Alabama closed its campus at 4:00 p.m. CST. The storm brought 18,000 power outages to Austin. Alabama recorded 35,000 power outages while Mississippi saw 6,800 power outages. Close to 5 in (130 mm) of rain fell. Minneapolis recorded their largest November snowstorm since 1991, with 8.4 in (21 cm) of snow falling in the city. In New York City, heavy rain and strong wind resulted in the Marine Park Bridge and Cross Bay Bridge being closed to pedestrians, and the FAA temporarily stopping all flights into and out of LaGuardia Airport. Wind gusts reached 63 mph (101 km/h) at Albany International Airport. Almost 73,000 customers lost power due to the storm in Maine.

== December ==
=== December 4 (Italy) ===
FU	F0	F1	F2	F3	F4	F5
1	0	0	1	0	0	0

An F2 tornado struck Isola di Capo Rizzuto, Italy and damaged numerous masonry-construction homes, some of which had their roofs torn off, including a few that had portions of their top floor exterior walls collapsed. A metal beam was impaled into the second story of one home, extensive tree and power line damage occurred in town, masonry fencing was knocked over, and cars were tossed and damaged as well. Significant damage also occurred outside of town, as large farm buildings were damaged or destroyed, farm animals were killed, farmhouses were damaged, and metal truss transmission towers were collapsed. Metal roofing debris from structures was wrapped around fences and trees, many trees were snapped or uprooted in rural areas, and numerous RV campers and small cabins were flipped and damaged at multiple campgrounds. A waterspout also came ashore in the Livorno area, briefly becoming a weak tornado and causing no damage.

=== December 12–15 (United States) ===
EFU	EF0	EF1	EF2	EF3	EF4	EF5
6	20	30	20	1	0	0

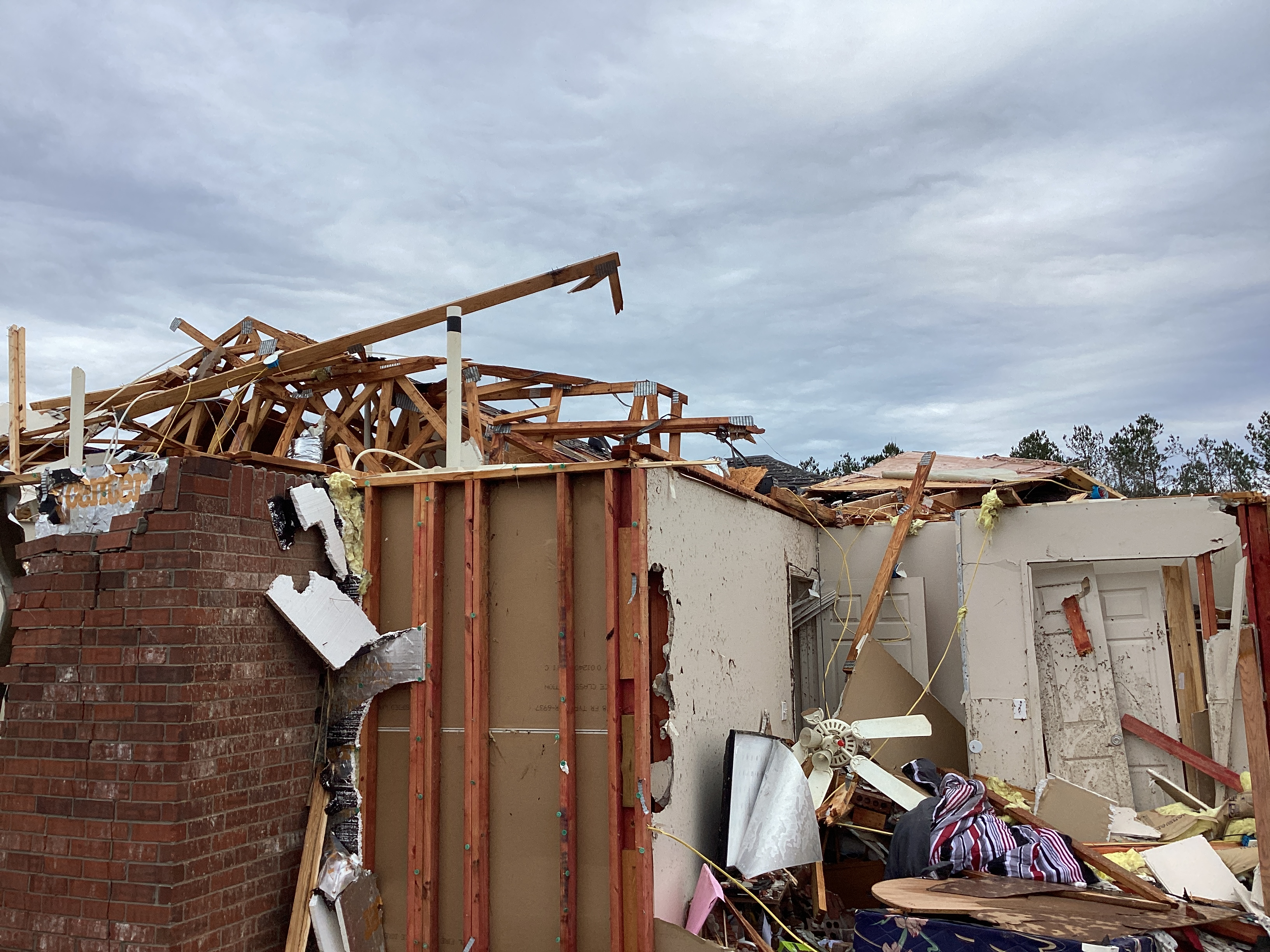
Low-end EF3 damage to a one-story apartment building in Farmerville, Louisiana.

A four-day tornado outbreak impacted the Southern United States in mid-December with tornadoes being confirmed in Oklahoma, Texas, Louisiana, Mississippi, Alabama, Georgia, and Florida. On December 12, the Storm Prediction Center issued a slight risk of severe weather for western Kansas, along with parts of the Oklahoma and Texas panhandles. A few supercell thunderstorms developed later that night, producing two weak tornadoes in Oklahoma, neither of which caused any damage. On December 13, an enhanced risk was issued farther to the southeast, including a 10% hatched risk area for tornadoes in eastern Texas, central Louisiana, and western Mississippi. Pre-dawn, supercells formed in south-central Oklahoma and significant tornadoes began touching down, including an EF2 tornado that damaged trees, roofs, and power lines in Wayne before destroying a house outside of town. Father south, several other EF2 tornadoes touched down in Texas, one of which ripped the roofs off of homes, damaged vehicles, and destroyed barns near Decatur. Later that morning, a complex of multiple semi-discrete supercells produced numerous tornadoes in and around the Dallas–Fort Worth metroplex, including two EF1 tornadoes that caused extensive damage to businesses in Grapevine, one of which was rated high-end EF1 and injured five people. An EF2 tornado damaged the athletic field at a school in Blue Ridge before it caused significant damage to homes and a water treatment plant near Leonard, injuring two people. Additional strong tornadoes touched down farther east later that evening, including a high-end EF2 tornado near Keachi, Louisiana, that obliterated several mobile homes in the small community of Four Forks, resulting in two fatalities. A low-end EF3 tornado injured 14 people as it struck the northern fringes of Farmerville, where an apartment complex sustained major structural damage, cars were flipped, and mobile homes and outbuildings were destroyed. A low-end EF2 tornado downed many trees, damaged the roofs of homes, and destroyed several mobile homes and outbuildings in the town of Anguilla, Mississippi, as well.

On December 14, an enhanced risk was issued for parts of the Gulf Coast region, and was later upgraded to a moderate risk, with a 15% hatched tornado risk area in place for parts of Louisiana, Mississippi, and Alabama. Numerous discrete supercell thunderstorms formed later that day, many of which produced tornadoes, some of which were strong. A high-end EF2 tornado was shown live on KADN-TV as it struck New Iberia, Louisiana, causing major damage to many homes, apartment buildings, a few businesses, and a hospital, injuring 16 people. In Mississippi, a long-tracked EF2 tornado snapped or uprooted countless trees as it passed through densely forested areas near Garlandville and Hickory, while a large high-end EF2 tornado damaged or destroyed a few houses and mobile homes near Shubuta. The towns of Killona and Montz, Louisiana, sustained major damage from an EF2 tornado, as many homes and mobile homes sustained major structural damage or were destroyed, and one woman in Killona was killed. Another destructive EF2 tornado was broadcast live on WDSU as it moved through the eastern part of the New Orleans metro area, following a path similar to a high-end EF3 tornado from March 22, 2022. The tornado damaged or destroyed numerous homes, businesses, and other structures, downed many trees and power lines, and injured six people. Farther east, two EF2 tornadoes caused major tree damage in remote wooded areas near Bladon Springs, Alabama, one of which caused total deforestation in one area and was rated high-end EF2. A few additional tornadoes occurred in Georgia and Florida the next day before the outbreak came to an end. In all, 73 tornadoes were confirmed, resulting in three fatalities and 64 injuries.

=== December 27 (Bolivia) ===
A rare tornado of unknown intensity struck El Alto, Bolivia, damaging at least five homes. The Bolivian Service of Meteorology said this was the first reported tornado in the area since 2019.

== Tornadic research ==
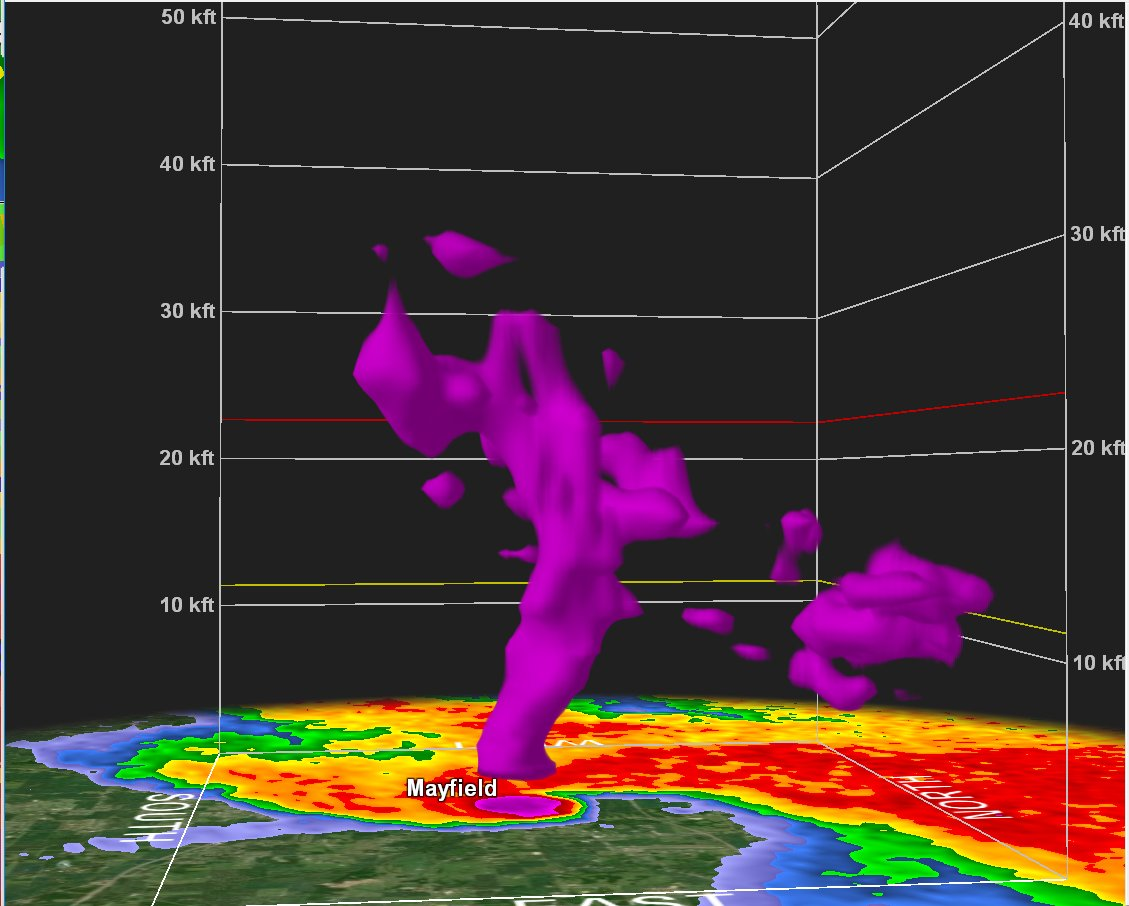
Radar 3D volume scan of the 2021 Western Kentucky tornado showing debris lofted over 30,000 feet (9.1 km) in the air as the tornado struck Mayfield, Kentucky

Throughout 2022, research studies from various government and academic institutions has taken place or was published.

Between March 2022 and April 2023, the Propagation, Evolution, and Rotation in Linear Storms (PERiLS) Project occurred. The project involved over a hundred people from sixteen organizations and was described as "the largest and most ambitious study focused on improving [the] understanding of tornadoes associated with linear storms." The PERiLS Project was funded by two grants from the National Science Foundation, three grants from the NOAA's VORTEX-USA program, and a grant from the United States Department of Commerce. Also in March 2022, the National Weather Service published a new damage survey and analysis for the 2012 Henryville EF4 tornado, where a "possible EF5 damage" location is identified and discussed.

In July, a research team, from the University of Oklahoma, National Severe Storms Laboratory, and University of Alabama in Huntsville was funded by the National Oceanic and Atmospheric Administration to investigate a stretch 8.7 miles (14 km) of the 2019 Greenwood Springs, Mississippi EF2 tornado where the National Weather Service was unable to survey. In their survey, published in Monthly Weather Review, they note that the tornado "produced forest devastation and electrical infrastructure damage up to at least EF4 intensity" and conclude by writing that "the Greenwood Springs event was a violent tornado, potentially even EF5 intensity."

Days later, Timothy Marshall, a meteorologist, structural and forensic engineer; Zachary B. Wienhoff, with Haag Engineering Company; Christine L. Wielgos, a meteorologist at the National Weather Service of Paducah; and Brian E. Smith, a meteorologist at the National Weather Service of Omaha, publish a detailed damage survey and analysis of the 2021 Western Kentucky EF4 tornado. In their conclusion, the researchers state, "the tornado damage rating might have been higher had more wind-resistant structures been encountered. Also, the fast forward speed of the tornado had little 'dwell' time of strong winds over a building, and thus, the damage likely would have been more severe if the tornado were slower."

== See also ==
- Weather of 2022
- Tornado
  - Tornadoes by year
  - Tornado records
  - Tornado climatology
  - Tornado myths
- List of tornado outbreaks
  - List of F5 and EF5 tornadoes
  - List of F4 and EF4 tornadoes
    - List of F4 and EF4 tornadoes (2020–present)
  - List of F3, EF3, and IF3 tornadoes (2020–present)
  - List of North American tornadoes and tornado outbreaks
  - List of 21st-century Canadian tornadoes and tornado outbreaks
  - List of European tornadoes and tornado outbreaks
  - List of tornadoes and tornado outbreaks in Asia
  - List of Southern Hemisphere tornadoes and tornado outbreaks
  - List of tornadoes striking downtown areas
  - List of tornadoes with confirmed satellite tornadoes
- Tornado intensity
  - Fujita scale
  - Enhanced Fujita scale
  - International Fujita scale
    - List of tornadoes rated on the International Fujita scale
  - TORRO scale
