= Point, Texas =

- City
- Seal

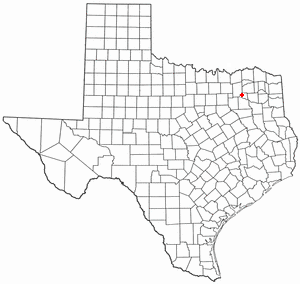
- Location of Point, Texas

- Coordinates: 32°55′46″N 95°52′25″W
- Country: United States
- State: Texas
- County: Rains

Area
  - Total: 2.78 sq mi (7.21 km^{2})
  - Land: 2.76 sq mi (7.14 km^{2})
  - Water: 0.027 sq mi (0.07 km^{2})
- Elevation: 509 ft (155 m)

Population (2020)
  - Total: 745
  - Density: 270/sq mi (104/km^{2})
- Time zone: UTC-6 (Central (CST))
  - Summer (DST): UTC-5 (CDT)
- ZIP code: 75472
- Area code: 430, 903
- FIPS code: 48-58532
- GNIS feature ID: 2411448
- Website: www.cityofpoint.org

Point is a city in Rains County, Texas, United States. Its population was 745 at the 2020 census.

== History ==
Settled circa 1880 as a flag station on a section of the Missouri–Kansas–Texas Railroad (MKT) being built from Mineola to Greenville, the name submitted for a post office was initially Rice's Point, in honor of early area settler William Rice. When that was rejected, the name Point was accepted.

By 1890, the community had an estimated population of 50, a public school, and four churches. Ten men, led by newspaperman Isaac Newton Gresham, met in Point on August 28, 1902, and signed a charter to establish the Farmers' Educational and Cooperative Union of America. The organization went national in 1905 and had a million members by 1908. In 1913, Point established the first independent school district in Rains County. The number of residents had risen to around 600 in 1914.

The Great Depression severely impacted the community, leading to a rapid decline in population and the number of businesses in Point. The paving of U.S. Route 69 in the early 1940s bolstered the population to around 420, but that figure had again declined to 350 by the end of that decade. The MKT line was abandoned in the mid-1950s. In 1957, the Iron Bridge Dam was constructed on the Sabine River to form Lake Tawakoni. When the lake reached its fullest extent in 1960, it was only 4 miles from Point. Point was incorporated as a city in 1966. Development along the shores of Lake Tawakoni eventually became a separate community, East Tawakoni, which incorporated in 1967. Point's population was 419 in 1970 and slowly grew, due to a combination of tourism and its role as a local agricultural trade center. The 1990 census reported 645 residents living in the city and 792 in 2000.

== Geography ==
Point is situated at the junction of U.S. Route 69 and Farm Roads 47 and 514 in northwestern Rains County, about 8 miles northwest of Emory and 60 miles east of Dallas.

According to the United States Census Bureau, the city has a total area of 2.78 square miles (7.2 km^{2}), of which 0.02 sq mi (0.052 km^{2}) is covered by water.

=== Climate ===
The climate in this area is characterized by hot, humid summers and generally mild to cool winters. According to the Köppen climate classification, Point has a humid subtropical climate, Cfa on climate maps.

== Demographics ==
Historical population
Census	Pop.	Note	%±
1970	419		—
1980	468		11.7%
1990	645		37.8%
2000	792		22.8%
2010	820		3.5%
2020	745		−9.1%
U.S. Decennial Census

=== 2020 census ===
As of the 2020 census, 745 people, 294 households, and 260 families were residing in the city; the median age was 37.8 years, with 26.2% of residents under 18 and 15.0% were 65 or older. For every 100 females, there were 97.6 males, and for every 100 females 18 and over, there were 93.7 males 18 and over.

None of the residents lived in urban areas, while 100.0% lived in rural areas.

Of the 294 households in Point, 37.1% had children under 18 living with them, 43.5% were married-couple households, 18.0% were households with a male householder and no spouse or partner present, and 31.3% were households with a female householder and no spouse or partner present. About 22.5% of all households were made up of individuals, and 9.2% had someone living alone who was 65 or older.

Of the 336 housing units, 12.5% were vacant. The homeowner vacancy rate was 3.9% and the rental vacancy rate was 8.0%.

Racial composition as of the 2020 census
Race	Number	Percentage
White	647	86.8%
Black or African American	7	0.9%
American Indian and Alaska Native	9	1.2%
Asian	3	0.4%
Native Hawaiian and other Pacific Islander	0	0.0%
Some other race	21	2.8%
Two or more races	58	7.8%
Hispanic or Latino (of any race)	67	9.0%

== Education ==
The City of Point is served by the Rains Independent School District.

== Police ==
Effective March 6, 2026, all of the Point Police Department, including the reserve officers and chief of police, were eliminated.
