= Camp Maxey =

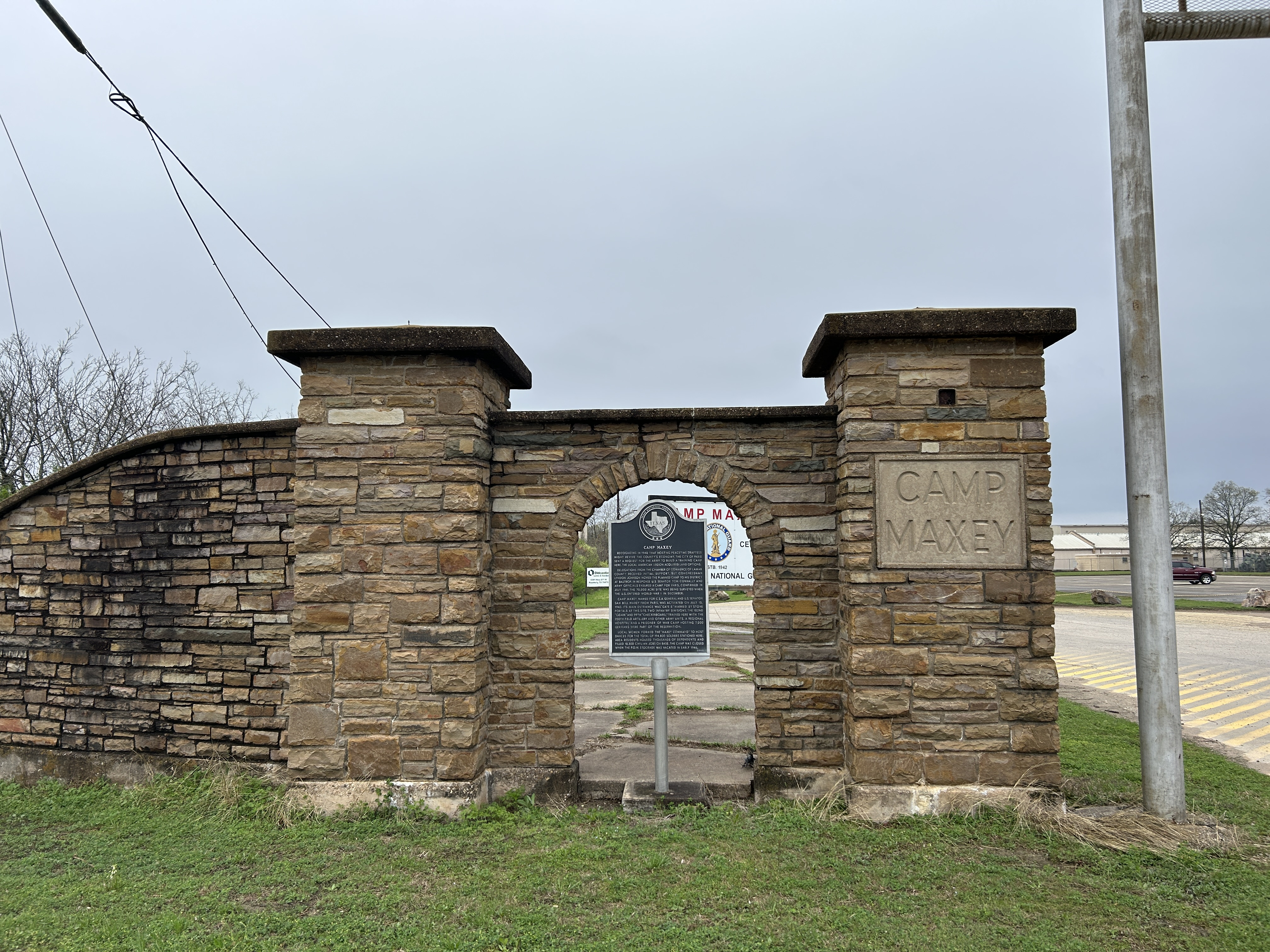
- Nickname: Camp Maxey Training Site
- Location within the state of Texas
- Coordinates: 33°46′53″N 95°32′39″W
- Country: United States
- State: Texas
- County: Lamar

Area
  - Total: 14,427 acres (5,838 ha)
  - Land: 10,144 acres (4,105 ha)
  - Water: 4,283 acres (1,733 ha)
- Time zone: UTC-6 (Central (CST))
  - Summer (DST): UTC-5 (CDT)
- ZIP codes: 75473
- Area code: 903

Camp Maxey is a Texas Military Department training facility that was originally built as a U.S. Army infantry-training camp during World War II. It was occupied from July 1942 to early 1946, and located near the community of Powderly, Texas, in the north-central portion of Lamar County. Its main entrance was located 9 miles north of Paris, Texas. Planning for the 70,000-acre military post began in 1940, soon after the National Military Draft was ordered; the planning accelerated in 1941 shortly before the United States entered World War II in December 1941.

On 1 May 1941, an engineering contract to design a $22,800,000 military camp in northwest Lamar County was awarded to a Dallas firm. On 20 January 1942, Congressman Patman announced that groundbreaking for the camp was imminent. Construction of the camp started on 27 February 1942, and on 2 April 1942, the Army issued General Orders No. 17, which included the name of the military reservation. The facility near Paris, Texas, was named Camp Maxey in honor of Confederate Brigadier General Samuel Bell Maxey. The first US Army personnel to manage the new reservation arrived on 4 July 1942. The post was activated by the US Army on 15 July 1942, under the command of Lieutenant Colonel Callie H. Palmer.

== Troops arriving ==
The first division to be trained at the camp was the 102d Infantry Division. Cadre personnel of the 102nd Infantry arrived at Camp Maxey on 1 September 1942, and the post was formally activated on 15 September 1942, under Major General John B. Anderson. The 102nd Infantry Division before the war was a National Guard infantry unit from Missouri and Kansas that formed in 1921 and was nicknamed the "Ozark Division". Nationwide military enlistment greatly expanded throughout 1942 in response to US troops departing for combat action in the Pacific and European theaters. Young men from throughout the United States filled the 102nd Infantry Division's ranked and arrived for training at Camp Maxey. Trainloads of draftees began arriving and the division began to grow to its authorized strength of 40,000.

The field training of the draftees consisted of a variety of infantry exercises spread over the reservation's 70,000 acres. The varied terrain provided facilities for working out problems of infantry training to meet modern battle conditions. An artillery range, obstacle course, infiltration course, and "German village" were included in training maneuvers. In an era before electronic targets, camp designers used an ingenious arrangement of ropes and pulleys to pop silhouette targets up in windows and doorways to add authenticity and realism to the village training area. The camp's obstacle course used challenging barbed-wire barriers and small dynamite charges to simulate artillery explosions.

In March 1943, command of Camp Maxey administration was passed to Colonel Robert O. Annin, who remained there for the duration of the war. In late 1943, the 102nd Division departed after one year at Camp Maxey, moving to Louisiana for maneuvers before being sent into action in France shortly after the Normandy Invasion. Major General Anderson remained at Camp Maxey to command Tenth Corps Headquarters.

In November 1943, the 99th Infantry Division, nicknamed the "Checkerboard Division", arrived at Camp Maxey under the command of Major General Walter E. Lauer. The 99th Infantry Division trained at Camp Maxey until September 1944 and was sent into action in the European Theatre.

In addition to training the 102nd Infantry and 99th Infantry, Camp Maxey hosted other military units from 1942 through 1945, including: 9th Headquarters, 3rd (later 4th) Army Special Troops, Army Service Forces Replacement Training Center (ROTC students from a five-state area), Tenth Corps Headquarters, 1882nd (local administration for the Eighth Service Command), Regional Hospital and Reconditioning Annex, Infantry Advance Replacement Training Center (15-week basic training for replacement troops to existing divisions after October 1944), and Regional Troops Separation Point (at the end of the war after 15 September 1945). Other nondivisional units trained at Camp Maxey including artillery (250th Field Artillery who fired the one-millionth round of World War II on 29 January 1945), and associated reconnaissance aircraft, tanks, tank destroyers, cavalry, ordinance, quartermaster, signal corps, engineers, medics, and military police (793rd Military Police Battalion was activated at Camp Maxey on 26 December 1942. The battalion stayed at Camp Maxey until February 1944, when they departed for Scotland to train for the invasion of France).

== Camp Maxey as a prisoner of war camp ==
Camp Maxey was a prisoner of war (POW) camp from October 1943 to February 1946. The POW area consisted of barracks and recreation halls inside a large, fenced stockade with watchtowers. It was located at the extreme southeast corner of the reservation along the railroad and highway. It was ordered to be constructed in 1942 and projected to hold captives from the Pacific theatre. Triumph for the Allies in North Africa in the spring of 1943, and the realization that the Japanese would not surrender in large numbers, resulted in the internment of principally German troops from the defeated Afrika Korps. Later in the war, more noncommissioned officers arrived from the German army, navy, and air force until the camp grew to 7,458 prisoners by April 1945, but stopped short of its capacity of 9,000. The last German prisoners of war left Camp Maxey in the spring of 1946.

== The closure of Camp Maxey ==
With the European war over in May 1945, and the Pacific war abruptly ending in August 1945, the principal training assignment of Camp Maxey was finished. Camp Maxey was placed on the "inactive list" on 1 October 1945, with the Regional Hospital to close 1 November. The POW camp, Separation Point, and station complement were to remain open, but their population slowly dwindled. The final issue of the camp newspaper Maxey Times on 12 October 1945 highlighted the camp's history, noted the rapidly shrinking populations of its personnel, and featured a farewell message from the Camp Commander Col. Annin.

The camp sat empty, but intact, for several years after the war. During the 1950s, the federal government began the final process of dismantling the Camp Maxey cantonment and selling off the land. More than 1,000 buildings were sold for demolition, and some were moved for relocation as public facilities. Several thousand acres were kept intact by the federal government, including the old post command buildings and vehicle shops near Gate 5 (current National Guard Camp Maxey Training Center Headquarters’ and cantonment area), and turned over to the Texas National Guard for a training facility. In the early 1960s, some 10,000 acres of the old artillery range on the north side of the former camp along Sanders Creek, conveniently without improvements or public access for the past 20 years, were transferred to the US Army Corps of Engineers for construction of the Pat Mayse Reservoir. This reduced the size of Camp Maxey to about 6,650 acres.

== The National Guard era ==
Presently, the installation serves as a training center for the Texas National Guard. Most of the original buildings were demolished or sold and removed. The base falls under the command of the Texas Army National Guard's Training Centers Command located at Camp Mabry, Austin, Texas. The camp's responsibility is to provide training facilities to units in Northeast Texas region from DFW to Marshall to Texarkana. This area involves various types of units, i.e. infantry, engineer, and other support units. Some upgrades have been completed over the last decade to include upgraded ranges and troop housing facilities, which occurred during the war on terror era. On 4 November 2022, Camp Maxey was hit by a violent EF4 tornado.

== See also ==
- Awards and decorations of the Texas Military
- List of conflicts involving the Texas Military
- List of U.S. Army installations named for Confederate soldiers
- List of World War II prisoner-of-war camps in the United States
- Texas Military Forces
