= Tornado outbreak of November 4–5, 2022 =

Late-season tornado outbreak in the Southern United States

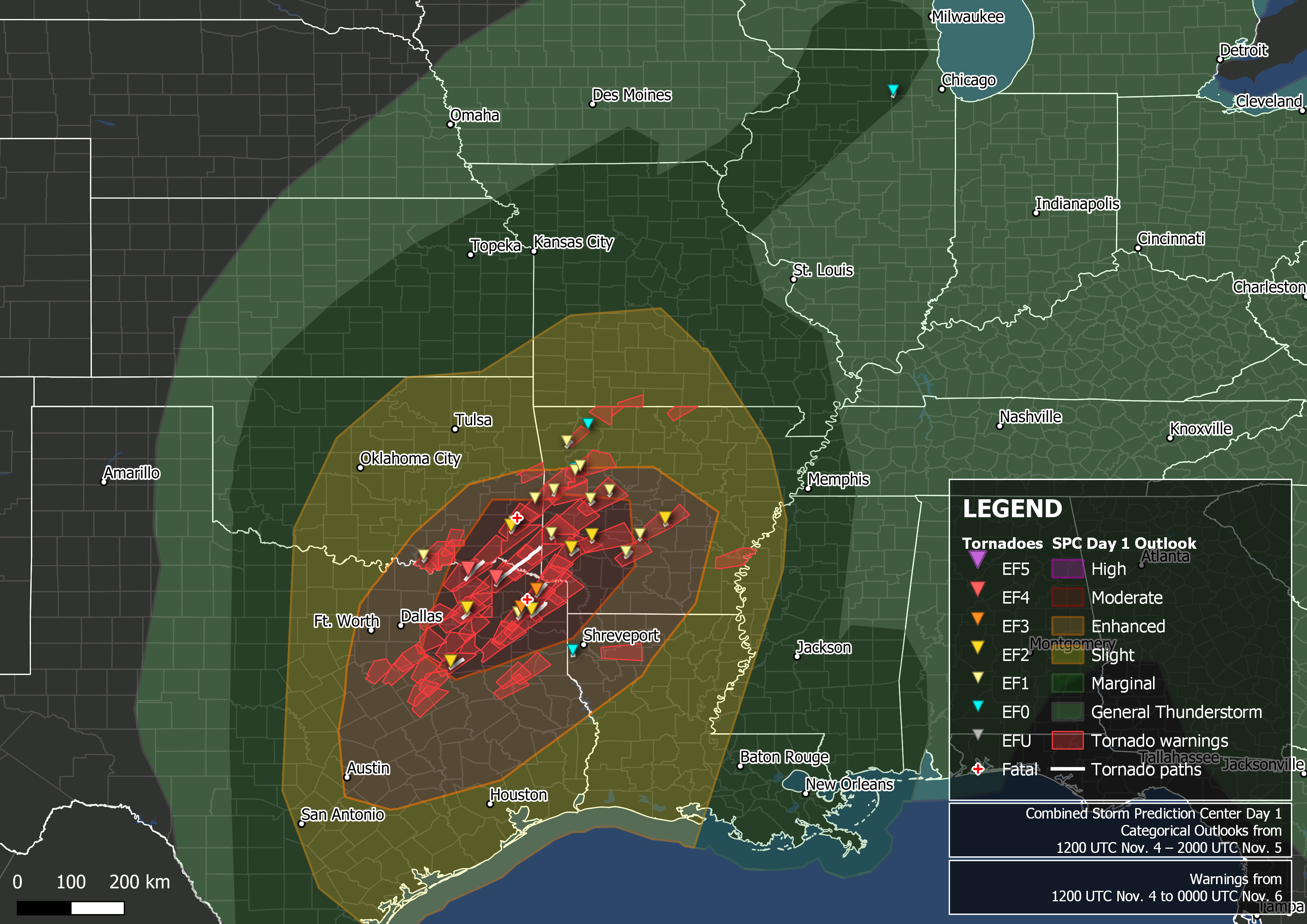
- Map of tornado warnings and confirmed tornadoes from the outbreak

Meteorological history
- Duration: November 4–5, 2022

Tornado outbreak
- Tornadoes: 31
- Max. rating: EF4 tornado
- Duration: 21 hours, 40 minutes
- Highest winds: Tornadic - 170 mph (270 km/h) (Caviness, TX and Clarksville, TX EF4 tornadoes on November 4)
- Highest gusts: Non-tornadic - 80 mph (130 km/h) (Roselle, Illinois straight-line winds on November 5)
- Largest hail: 2.75 in (7.0 cm) near East Tawakoni, Texas, on November 4
- Max. snowfall: 12 in (30 cm) in Longs Peak, Colorado, on November 3–4

Overall effects
- Fatalities: 2 (+1 non-tornadic)
- Injuries: 34+
- Areas affected: Colorado, Texas, Oklahoma, Arkansas, Louisiana, Wisconsin, Illinois
- Power outages: 88,000
- Part of the tornado outbreaks of 2022

A significant late-season tornado outbreak took place on November 4, 2022, across Northeast Texas, southwestern Arkansas, southeastern Oklahoma, and northwestern Louisiana with multiple large, destructive tornadoes occurring over a span of several hours. Major damage was reported in Sulphur Springs, Powderly, Caviness, Paris, Cason, Daingerfield, Athens, New Boston, Texas, and Idabel, Oklahoma, with the latter two communities being placed under tornado emergencies. Two fatalities occurred in Cason, Texas, and Pickens, Oklahoma, respectively. Numerous PDS tornado warnings were issued as well. An additional tornado embedded within a narrow, but intense line of showers with damaging winds was also confirmed in Illinois the following morning as the system progressed eastward. Strong winds affected most of the western Great Lakes throughout the day before moving into Canada that evening. Two fatalities and at least 34 injuries were confirmed from tornadoes, and an additional fatality occurred near Stilwell, Oklahoma, from drowning.

== Meteorological synopsis ==
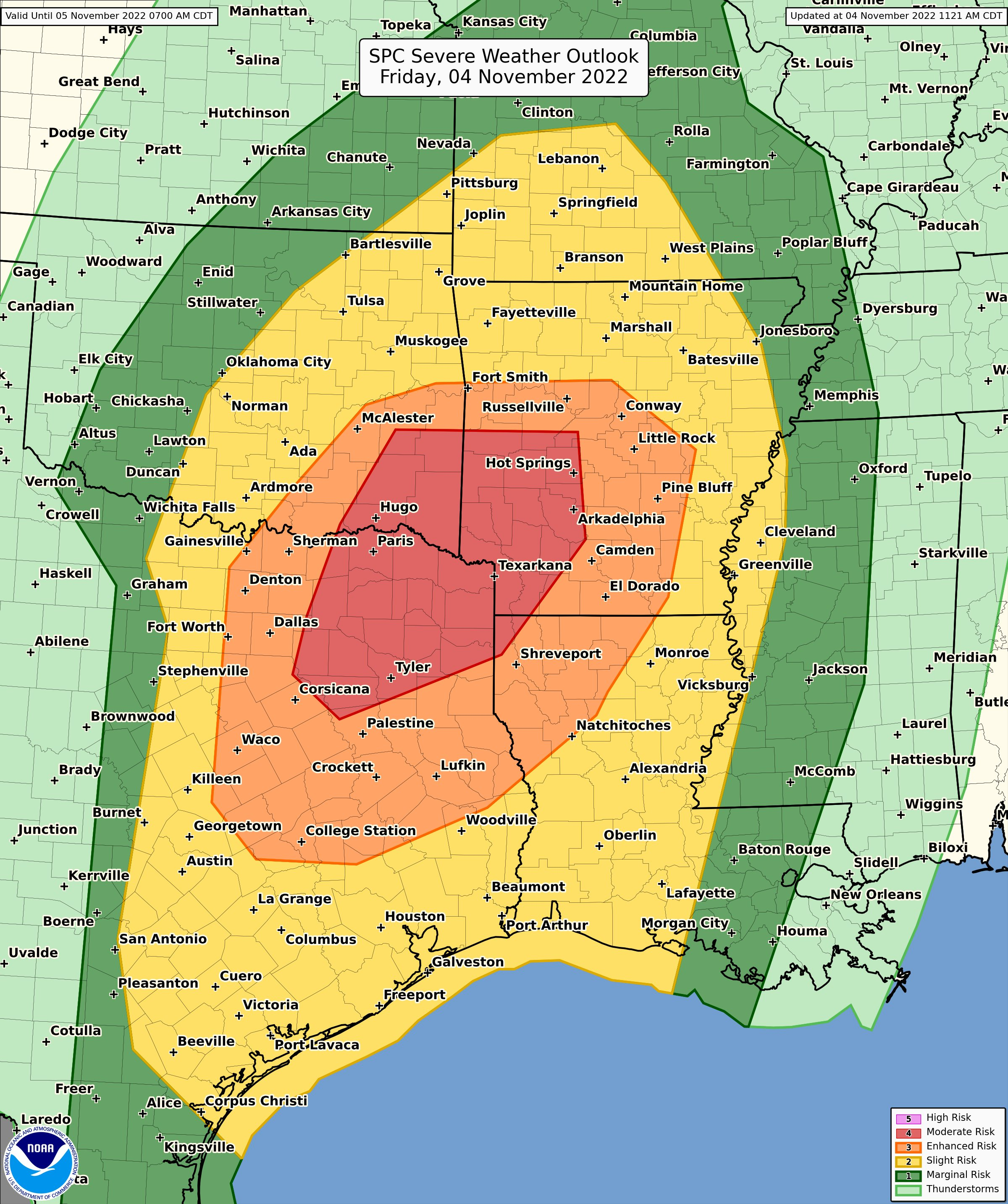
Storm Prediction Center Severe Weather Outlook for November 4.

The risk for a late-season severe weather event first became apparent on October 29 when the Storm Prediction Center (SPC) delineated a threat area across portions of the United States Southern Plains. With some time, computer weather models began to indicate the potential for a significant outbreak of severe thunderstorms farther east across portions of Northeastern Texas, Southeastern Oklahoma, and Southwestern Arkansas. On November 2, the SPC issued a Day 3 slight risk outlook, which had a rare upgrade to enhanced, highlighting a small corridor centered along northeastern Texas, extreme southeastern Oklahoma, southwestern Arkansas, and northwestern Louisiana. Elevated helicity, expected to be around 250 m^{2}/s^{2}, was expected to be coupled with a 50+ kt low-level jet in the area, providing the necessary ingredients for sustained supercells and embedded QLCS rotations, noting the possibilities for tornadoes, some significant. Tornadoes were expected to be most probable with any supercell that managed to spawn ahead of an expected cold front.

The next day, at 0600 UTC, the SPC expanded the enhanced risk area, while introducing a 10% hatched risk for tornadoes (indicating an elevated probability for strong tornadoes to occur), centered in northeastern Texas, and southeastern Oklahoma. With the newer models, more substantial destabilization was expected across the I-35 corridor, giving more favorable patterns for semi-discrete supercell structures to develop. Moisture, provided by sufficient daylight heating, was expected to mix with the predicted low-level jet, at around 500 mb (15 inHg), would further improve the conditions for supercells. For the 1700 UTC outlook, the SPC increased the overall area of risk for significant tornadoes, now including regions of southwestern Arkansas.

The SPC issued a level 4/Moderate risk of severe weather for this region on the afternoon of November 4. Water vapor imagery the morning of the event depicted a large upper-level trough moving across New Mexico, with accompanied mid-level winds upwards of 80–90 kn (90–105 mph; 150–165 km/h) entering Western Texas. At the surface, the expected, stout cold front was progressing southward across Southern Oklahoma. In the warm sector ahead of this feature, southerly low-level winds supplied the northward transport of moisture. Morning atmospheric soundings from the Dallas–Fort Worth metroplex indicated the presence of a stout capping inversion. However, the combination of that rich moisture – with dewpoints in the upper 60s to lower 70s Fahrenheit – and cooling mid-level temperatures were expected to foster modest destabilization of the atmosphere despite widespread cloud cover. Mid-level convective available potential energy values were forecast to reach 1,000–2,000 J/kg.

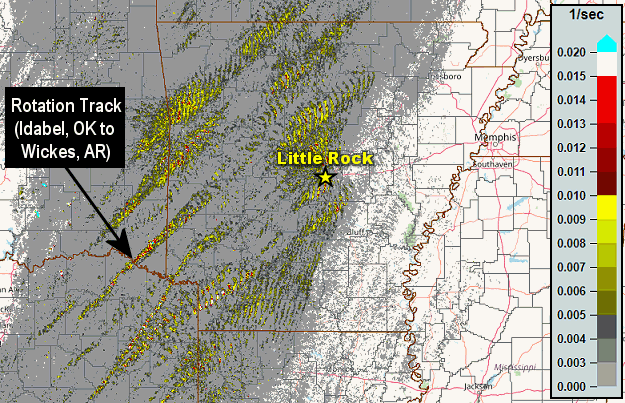
Rotational tracks of supercells moving into Arkansas

At 18:00 UTC (1:00 p.m. CDT), the SPC issued the first of several weather watches across the Southern Plains, warning of the potential for a few intense tornadoes across the level 4/Moderate risk area. As the capping inversion eroded, a band of thunderstorms began to develop south of the Dallas–Fort Worth metroplex and progress eastward. Given the favorable confluence of strong wind shear, deep moisture, and instability, this band organized into distinct and significant supercell thunderstorms across the ArkLaTex region. Numerous tornadoes were observed, some of which were large and destructive, notably in the cities of Powderly and New Boston in Texas, and Idabel, Oklahoma; rare tornado emergencies were issued for the latter two cities. While concerns about additional supercell development shifted eastward into Southern Arkansas and Northern Louisiana, forecasters warned of an increasing damaging wind threat across Western and Central Arkansas.

== Confirmed tornadoes ==
Confirmed tornadoes by Enhanced Fujita rating
EFU	EF0	EF1	EF2	EF3	EF4	EF5	Total
1	4	15	7	2	2	0	31

=== November 4 event ===
List of confirmed tornadoes – Friday, November 4, 2022 (Note: All dates are based on the local time zone where the tornado touched down; however, all times are in Coordinated Universal Time for consistency.)
EF#	Location	County / Parish	State	Start Coord.	Time (UTC)	Path length	Max width
EF1	Calera	Bryan	OK	33.912°N 96.458°W	18:30–18:34	3.4 mi (5.5 km)	40 yd (37 m)
EF1	A mobile home was overturned and destroyed, other mobile homes were damaged, and a semi-truck and trailer were thrown into the median of US 69 near the beginning of the path. Utility poles were snapped, and highway signs and billboards were damaged as well. The tornado moved northeast and through the western sections of Calera. Damage in town was primarily to trees, although two homes were significantly damaged by falling trees. Some other homes suffered shingle damage as well.						
EF4	SW of Brookston, TX to Midcity, TX to ESE of Spencerville, OK	Lamar (TX), Choctaw (OK)	TX, OK	33.5995°N 95.749°W	21:16–22:12	44.71 mi (71.95 km)	1,700 yd (1,600 m)
EF4	See section on this tornado – Eleven people were injured.						
EF1	W of Dougherty to WNW of Bonanza	Rains, Hopkins	TX	32.9545°N 95.7928°W	22:08–22:14	4.38 mi (7.05 km)	150 yd (140 m)
EF1	A carport and many large trees were damaged.						
EF2	SW of Sulphur Springs	Hopkins	TX	33.0072°N 95.7297°W	22:15–22:19	2.9 mi (4.7 km)	160 yd (150 m)
EF2	A relatively narrow but strong tornado touched down almost immediately after the previous tornado dissipated, snapping trees and causing significant damage to multiple houses in the Greenview community. One of the homes had roof and exterior wall loss, and another residence was pushed off its foundation.						
EF2	S of Malakoff to NE of Athens	Henderson	TX	32.1080°N 96.0044°W	22:35–22:58	15.05 mi (24.22 km)	150 yd (140 m)
EF2	A wedding venue was damaged south of Malakoff before this heavy rain-wrapped tornado moved towards Athens. Numerous homes and outbuildings were damaged in and around Athens, and a Dollar General store had its windows blown out. The Athens Steel Building Corporation, housed in a large metal warehouse building, had major roof damage and sustained collapse of the southern part of the structure. More structures were damaged after the tornado exited Athens before it dissipated just southwest of Murchison. Numerous trees were snapped or uprooted along the path.						
EF2	SE of Pickens to NW of Battiest	McCurtain	OK	34.3908°N 94.9909°W	22:46–22:49	2.83 mi (4.55 km)	800 yd (730 m)
EF2	1 death – Shortly after touching down, this tornado destroyed a chicken house, tore large sections of roof off a home, and snapped hardwood trees. The tornado then flipped and destroyed a tied-down double-wide mobile home, resulting in a fatality. One person was also injured at this location, and a nearby vehicle was rolled. Additional trees were snapped before the tornado dissipated.						
EF1	E of Honobia	McCurtain, LeFlore	OK	34.4578°N 94.9439°W	22:51–23:07	11.3 mi (18.2 km)	1,600 yd (1,500 m)
EF1	A nearly mile-wide tornado snapped and uprooted numerous trees. A few homes were damaged and several outbuildings were destroyed.						
EF4	SW of Bogata, TX to Idabel, OK to NE of Eagletown, OK	Red River (TX), McCurtain (OK)	TX, OK	33.5047°N 95.2418°W	23:15–00:21	60.23 mi (96.93 km)	1,056 yd (966 m)
EF4	See section on this tornado — A total of 13 people were injured.						
EF1	E of Heavener	LeFlore	OK	34.871°N 94.589°W	23:33–23:41	6.5 mi (10.5 km)	900 yd (820 m)
EF1	This tornado touched down just southeast of Heavener, where several homes were damaged, and outbuildings were destroyed. Numerous trees were snapped or uprooted as the tornado moved northeast into heavily wooded, mountainous terrain.						
EF1	ESE of Pittsburg	Camp	TX	32.9458°N 94.8712°W	23:38–23:41	2.22 mi (3.57 km)	350 yd (320 m)
EF1	Trees were uprooted by this relatively brief tornado. The same supercell would produce the Cason EF3 tornado shortly after this one dissipated.						
EF3	S of Cason to E of Naples	Morris, Cass	TX	33.0218°N 94.8157°W	23:44–00:06	16.91 mi (27.21 km)	650 yd (590 m)
EF3	1 death – See section on this tornado — Eight people were injured.						
EF1	NE of Winslow	Washington	AR	35.829°N 94.054°W	23:53–00:00	6.5 mi (10.5 km)	1,000 yd (910 m)
EF1	This tornado moved through wooded and rugged terrain, uprooting trees and snapping a few power poles before dissipating.						
EF1	SW of Mansfield to NE of Huntington	Sebastian	AR	35.019°N 94.272°W	23:58–00:07	5.8 mi (9.3 km)	1,000 yd (910 m)
EF1	This high-end EF1 tornado struck Mansfield, where tree damage occurred and 16 homes were damaged, some significantly. Trees were snapped or uprooted at the east edge of Huntington and elsewhere along the path. Several outbuildings were damaged, power poles were downed, and a house between the two towns sustained considerable roof damage.						
EF3	W of Simms to N of New Boston	Bowie	TX	33.3163°N 94.5625°W	00:17–00:38	15.65 mi (25.19 km)	800 yd (730 m)
EF3	See section on this tornado						
EF0	NE of Huntsville	Madison	AR	36.115°N 93.697°W	00:20–00:22	1.3 mi (2.1 km)	150 yd (140 m)
EF0	A poultry barn received damage to its roof, and multiple trees were uprooted.						
EFU	Fort Chaffee	Sebastian, Franklin	AR	35.228°N 94.099°W	00:22–00:28	2.5 mi (4.0 km)	150 yd (140 m)
EFU	Tree damage occurred at Fort Chaffee, though the tornado moved through an area that was inaccessible to the damage survey team, and no intensity rating was assigned.						
EF2	SW of Hughes Springs to W of Douglassville	Cass	TX	32.9829°N 94.645°W	00:37–01:00	19.67 mi (31.66 km)	700 yd (640 m)
EF2	The tornado first struck the town of Hughes Springs, inflicting considerable damage to homes, heavily damaging some outbuildings and the fire station in town, and downing trees and power poles. The tornado reached peak strength shortly after it exited town, as two homes sustained loss of their roofs, including one that had some exterior walls partially knocked over. The tornado then weakened and downed numerous trees as it continued through sparsely populated areas. However, the tornado re-intensified near Cusseta, and countless large trees were snapped and twisted in this area, while a structure was damaged to a lesser degree. The tornado then weakened again, causing additional tree damage before dissipating over SH 77.						
EF1	NW of Branch	Franklin	AR	35.340°N 93.913°W	00:38–00:42	3.3 mi (5.3 km)	350 yd (320 m)
EF1	A few homes were damaged, outbuildings were destroyed, and trees were snapped or uprooted.						
EF0	W of Etna	Franklin	AR	35.370°N 93.900°W	00:41–00:43	1.7 mi (2.7 km)	150 yd (140 m)
EF0	Outbuildings were damaged and tree branches were snapped.						
EF1	SE of Wickes	Polk	AR	34.2862°N 94.3135°W	00:43–00:45	1.8 mi (2.9 km)	200 yd (180 m)
EF1	Several chicken houses had their roof panels ripped off, and one had its walls collapsed. Tree damage occurred along US 278 before the tornado dissipated.						
EF1	Green Forest	Carroll	AR	36.307°N 93.489°W	00:43–00:51	8.5 mi (13.7 km)	1,100 yd (1,000 m)
EF1	This tornado moved directly through Green Forest, where many homes had roof damage and broken windows, and one house had its garage door pushed in. A few businesses in town sustained minor damage, while fences and light poles were bent at a baseball field. Additional damage occurred outside of town, where several outbuildings and poultry barns were damaged or destroyed, and a few homes were damaged as well. Many trees and some power poles were downed along the path.						
EF1	W of Denning	Franklin, Logan	AR	35.416°N 93.829°W	00:46–00:51	3.1 mi (5.0 km)	1,100 yd (1,000 m)
EF1	Trees were uprooted, tree branches were snapped, and large round hay bales were moved.						
EF2	SW of Center Point to N of Briar	Howard	AR	34.0178°N 93.9763°W	01:37–01:43	8.14 mi (13.10 km)	200 yd (180 m)
EF2	To the west of Center Point, some chicken houses were badly damaged, a metal outbuilding was destroyed, and other outbuildings were damaged. Carports were torn from homes as well, one of which was thrown 100 yd (91 m). The most intense damage occurred as the tornado crossed US 278, where a free-standing communications tower was toppled to the ground and a mobile home was destroyed at low-end EF2 intensity. Numerous large trees were snapped or uprooted as the tornado moved through densely forested areas before it dissipated near Briar. This tornado was very fast-moving and had an average forward speed of 81.6 miles per hour (131.3 km/h).						
EF1	SW of Bluffton	Yell	AR	34.8638°N 93.6553°W	01:49–01:53	3.7 mi (6.0 km)	600 yd (550 m)
EF1	A mobile home was damaged, a carport was destroyed, and trees were snapped or uprooted along the path.						
EF2	SE of Kirby	Pike	AR	34.2297°N 93.6332°W	02:08–02:10	1.7 mi (2.7 km)	75 yd (69 m)
EF2	A barn was completely destroyed and many trees were snapped or uprooted by this brief low-end EF2 tornado. Power lines were downed, and a metal outbuilding sustained minor roof damage.						
EF1	NW of Plainview	Yell	AR	35.0074°N 93.3366°W	02:15–02:18	2.3 mi (3.7 km)	100 yd (91 m)
EF1	Trees were snapped or uprooted, a double-wide manufactured home had its roof damaged, and an outbuilding was completely destroyed.						
EF1	NE of Gurdon to E of Gum Springs	Clark	AR	33.9722°N 93.0618°W	03:00–03:07	7.7 mi (12.4 km)	200 yd (180 m)
EF1	An old church building was shifted slightly off its block foundation, a house sustained minor damage, and numerous trees were downed.						
EF1	S of Malvern	Hot Spring	AR	34.268°N 92.8255°W	03:27–03:28	0.4 mi (0.64 km)	150 yd (140 m)
EF1	A brief tornado snapped trees and inflicted minor damage to a metal outbuilding.						
EF0	N of Spring Ridge	Caddo	LA	32.3166°N 93.9581°W	03:57–03:59	1.26 mi (2.03 km)	70 yd (64 m)
EF0	This brief tornado tore roof shingles and siding from a home and snapped numerous tree branches.						
EF2	SE of Sardis	Saline	AR	34.5138°N 92.4014°W	04:04–04:06	1.6 mi (2.6 km)	200 yd (180 m)
EF2	A brief but strong tornado damaged several homes, two of which were completely unroofed. Numerous trees were snapped or uprooted as well.						

=== November 5 event ===
List of confirmed tornadoes – Saturday, November 5, 2022
EF#	Location	County / Parish	State	Start Coord.	Time (UTC)	Path length	Max width
EF0	SW of Big Rock	Kendall, Kane	IL	41.7172°N 88.5733°W	16:06–16:10	3.7 mi (6.0 km)	100 yd (91 m)
EF0	Trees and power lines were downed sporadically, and a barn sustained roof damage.						

=== Brookston–Caviness–Midcity–Arthur City, Texas/Sawyer, Oklahoma ===
Brookston–Caviness–Midcity—Arthur City, Texas/Sawyer, Oklahoma
- The wedge tornado as seen near Caviness, Texas

Meteorological history
- Formed: November 4, 2022, 4:16 p.m. CDT (UTC−05:00)
- Dissipated: November 4, 2022, 5:12 p.m. CDT
- Duration: 56 minutes

EF4 tornado
- on the Enhanced Fujita scale
- Highest winds: 170 mph (270 km/h)

Overall effects
- Fatalities: 0
- Injuries: 11
- Damage: $5.9 million (2022 USD)

This violent, long-tracked, nearly mile-wide wedge tornado produced severe damage along its path of 44.7 miles (71.9 km). The tornado touched down at EF1 strength southwest of Brookston in Lamar County, Texas, and moved to the northeast. To the west-northwest of Brookston, it intensified to low-end EF2 strength as it collapsed several metal truss transmission towers. As the tornado crossed US 82, it weakened back to high-end EF1 strength as it snapped some wooden power poles. Shortly after crossing the highway, the tornado produced more high-end EF1 damage as it snapped multiple hardwood trees. EF1 damage to trees and structures continued as the tornado moved through rural areas to the northeast, passing east of Sumner. About 7 miles (11 km) southwest of Powderly, the tornado rapidly widened and intensified as it moved across County Road 32500, where a house was destroyed at EF3 strength and left with only a few walls standing. This location received a rating of mid-range EF3 with wind speeds estimated at 150 mph (240 km/h). Next to that residence, two other homes were heavily damaged and had their roofs torn off, and damage to those two houses was rated high-end EF2. Vehicles were flipped and tossed in this area, and large trees were snapped and stripped of their branches. Another house that was farther from the center of the damage path had its roof heavily damaged, with the damage to that home being rated mid-range EF1. The tornado continued to intensify and grew to 0.8 miles (1.3 km) in width as it entered the rural community of Caviness. In Caviness, the tornado reached its peak strength and crossed County Road 33620, where a well-constructed, anchor-bolted home was completely leveled and swept off its foundation. This location received a rating of EF4 with wind speeds estimated at 170 mph (270 km/h). Next to the EF4 damage, trees were denuded and partially debarked, and two other homes were also leveled and swept away. However, both homes were poorly anchored to their foundations, and a high-end EF3 rating with winds estimated at 160 mph (260 km/h) was applied to these residences. Additional homes in this area had their roofs and some exterior walls torn off at high-end EF2 strength.

The tornado rapidly weakened back down to EF1 strength and downed many trees as it passed through Camp Maxey. Past Camp Maxey, it rapidly re-intensified again to low-end EF3 strength as it directly impacted the small community of Midcity, where major damage occurred. In Midcity, two homes were destroyed at low-end EF3 strength, sustaining total roof loss and collapse of their exterior walls. Several other homes in town sustained high-end EF2 damage, and numerous trees and power poles were snapped in this area as well. Exiting Midcity and continuing to the northeast, the tornado weakened and narrowed as it crossed US 271, passing east of Arthur City. Structures and trees sustained EF1 damage as it moved towards the Red River and the Oklahoma state line. It then crossed into Choctaw County, Oklahoma and reintensified to EF2 strength, snapping numerous large hardwood trees in a wooded area near the intersection of North 4258 Road and East 2150 Road. The tornado began to rapidly widen once again, reaching its peak width of 0.9 miles (1.4 km), but weakened back to high-end EF1 strength in the process. An outbuilding was damaged, and many hardwood trees were snapped or uprooted in this unpopulated area. EF1 tree damage continued as it passed east of Sawyer and crossed over US-70 before the tornado dissipated east-southeast of Spencerville. Despite the severity of the damage, no fatalities occurred as a result of this tornado, though 11 people were injured.

=== Bogota–Clarksville–Acworth, Texas/Idabel–Broken Bow–Eagletown, Oklahoma ===
Bogota–Clarksville–Acworth, Texas/Idabel–Broken Bow–Eagletown, Oklahoma
- The tornado as it tracked near Clarksville, Texas.

Meteorological history
- Formed: November 4, 2022, 6:15 p.m. CDT (UTC−05:00)
- Dissipated: November 4, 2022, 7:21 p.m. CDT
- Duration: 1 hour, 6 minutes

EF4 tornado
- on the Enhanced Fujita scale
- Highest winds: 170 mph (270 km/h)

Overall effects
- Fatalities: 0
- Injuries: 13
- Damage: $37 million (2022 USD)

This long-tracked and violent wedge tornado, the longest-tracked of the outbreak, caused major damage along its path of 60.88 miles (97.98 km) through northeast Texas and southeast Oklahoma. The tornado touched down northwest of Bogata in Red River County, Texas, producing EF1 damage as it tore tin metal roofing off a large chicken house. Moving to the northeast, the tornado reached mid-range EF3 strength as it crossed FM 411 to the east of the small community of Fulbright. A house in this area collapsed and was pushed off its foundation, and a nearby home was left with only interior walls standing. A metal outbuilding was also obliterated, with damage to that structure being rated EF2. The tornado then weakened slightly but remained strong as it moved through wooded areas near County Road 1275, inflicting low-end EF3 damage to numerous large softwood and hardwood trees, a few of which sustained debarking. It then weakened to EF2 strength and crossed US 82, snapping and uprooting trees near the highway. EF2 damage continued northwest of Clarksville, and multiple homes and outbuildings were damaged or destroyed along this segment of the path. To the north of Clarksville, a house along SH 37 had much of its roof blown off, trees were snapped, and damage in this area was rated high-end EF1. Just beyond this point, the tornado abruptly intensified, reaching EF4 strength along County Road 3105. A large one-story home was swept clean from its foundation in this area, with structural debris scattered up to 200 yards (180 m) to the northeast. The house was not bolted to its foundation, however, it was extensively anchored with numerous heavy-duty nails, earning a low-end EF4 rating with wind speeds estimated to be at 170 mph (270 km/h). Ten people on the property of the home took shelter in an oil drain inside of a nearby metal outbuilding that was destroyed, and were left uninjured. Surrounding the EF4-rated home, widespread tree damage occurred, as large trees were snapped and debarked. Some trees were ripped out of the ground, a car was thrown into a field, and outbuildings were destroyed as well.

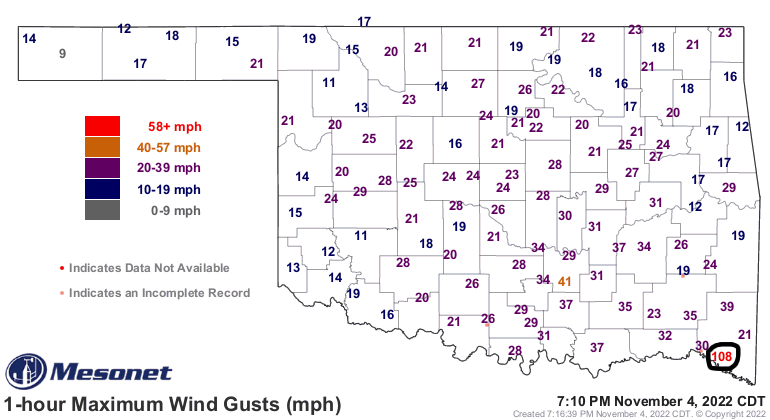
Oklahoma Mesonet station recording 108 mph winds from the Idabel tornado.

To the northeast of Clarksville, the tornado weakened again as it moved through remote forested areas, producing a large swath of EF3-level tree damage. It then impacted the rural community of Acworth at high-end EF3 strength, debarking trees and destroying multiple structures. The Mount Olive Church and a house were both completely leveled by the tornado. A double-wide manufactured home in Acworth was lifted off the ground and tossed 50 yards (46 m). The manufactured home had three dogs inside, all three of which survived. Just before crossing the Red River into Oklahoma, the tornado grew to its peak width of 0.6 mi (0.97 km). After entering Oklahoma, the tornado inflicted mid-range EF2 damage to several single-family homes as it moved through rural areas towards Idabel. A couple of the homes along this segment of the path sustained roof and exterior wall loss, outbuildings were destroyed, and trees were snapped or uprooted. Before reaching Idabel, the tornado missed the Oklahoma Mesonet Idabel observing platform along Ravens Nest Road by approximately 150 yards (140 m). At the platform, a measured gust of 108 mph (174 km/h) was recorded. Based on the damage observed in this area, it was determined that this gust was actually from the powerful rear flank downdraft of the supercell rather than the tornado itself.

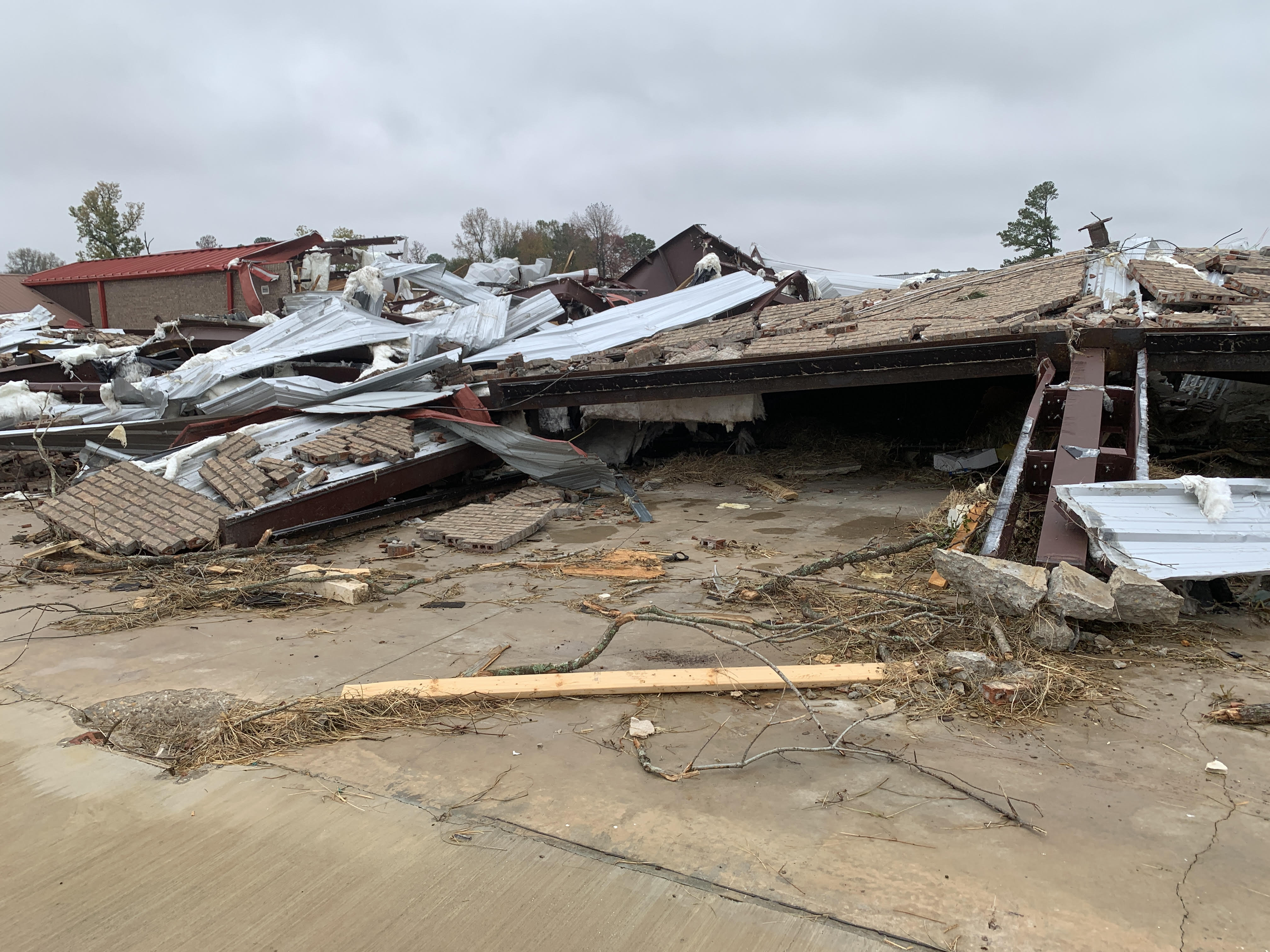
Mid-range EF3 damage to the Trinity Baptist Church in Idabel, Oklahoma.

The tornado narrowed and re-intensified again as it moved into Idabel, producing EF3 damage and injuring several people as it impacted the town. Major structural damage occurred in southeastern Idabel, as homes had their roofs torn off, some sustained collapse of their exterior walls, and one home along Leesa Drive was left with only a few walls standing. A two-story home had much of its second floor torn off and destroyed, and some businesses were damaged in this area as well. At the Idabel Country Club, numerous trees were snapped at EF2 strength, while one grove of hardwood trees at this location were snapped, stripped of their branches, and sustained debarking, earning a low-end EF3 rating. Multiple homes at the Idabel Country Club were damaged by a combination of tornadic winds and falling trees. The nearby Kiamichi Family Medical Center had severe structural damage, sustaining roof and exterior wall loss, with metal beams twisted and the façade torn off. Insulation from the building was strewn throughout the area, and damage to the structure was rated EF2. Continuing through eastern Idabel at EF3 strength, the tornado then crossed Southeast Lincoln Road, where it completely leveled the Donut Crossing donut shop and a nearby tire shop. After crossing East Washington Street (SH-3), the tornado narrowed down to 0.14 miles (0.23 km) in width, but continued to produce EF3 damage as it completely flattened the Trinity Baptist Church, which was housed in a large metal-framed building with brick façade. Concrete anchors were pulled out of the ground at this location, and a nearby doctor's office and a local bank were completely destroyed as well. Debris was scattered throughout this area, a McDonald's sign was damaged, and a few other businesses were damaged to a lesser degree.

As the tornado moved into the northeastern fringes of Idabel and exited the town, it weakened and grew to 0.4 miles (0.64 km) wide as it caused mainly EF1 damage, with a narrower swath of EF2 damage being observed within the larger area of EF1 damage. This narrow path of EF2 damage was likely caused by sub-vortices moving around within the larger circulation of the tornado. Trees were damaged, and a house at Meadow Lane had a large portion of its roof ripped off. Past Idabel, the tornado maintained its strength as it moved through unpopulated wooded areas, downing numerous trees and destroying some chicken houses. A small break in the damage path was noted as the tornado briefly lifted near the Little River with the rotation remaining aloft, though it quickly touched down again and reached high-end EF2 strength as it continued to the northeast, passing between Broken Bow and Eagletown. Significant damage was observed at the intersection of Craig Road and Red Arrow Road, where a double-wide mobile home was destroyed, with its metal undercarriage separated from the floor and bent. An elevator structure was blown off the top of a large silo, while many trees and power poles were snapped at this location as well. Farther along the path, mid-range EF2 damage occurred as the tornado crossed US-70, snapping additional power poles and downing numerous trees. The tornado then began to weaken significantly after it crossed US-70 and passed north of Eagletown, snapping and knocking down small trees at EF0 strength before dissipating after crossing Old Winship Road. 13 people were injured by this tornado.

=== Cason–Naples, Texas ===
Cason–Naples, Texas
- The tornado over open fields near Naples, Texas.

Meteorological history
- Formed: November 4, 2022, 6:44 p.m. CDT (UTC−05:00)
- Dissipated: November 4, 2022, 7:06 p.m. CDT
- Duration: 22 minutes

EF3 tornado
- on the Enhanced Fujita scale
- Highest winds: 155 mph (249 km/h)

Overall effects
- Fatalities: 1
- Injuries: 8
- Damage: ≥$5 million (2022 USD)

This intense wedge tornado touched down in Morris County, Texas, to the south of Cason along FM 144, and rapidly intensified to low-end EF2 strength almost immediately after it formed. Two manufactured homes were destroyed, two frame homes were damaged to a lesser degree, a boat was tossed, a small trailer was flipped, and trees were uprooted. Continuing to the northeast, the tornado continued to produce EF2 damage as it crossed County Road 1202, where another manufactured home was destroyed, and debris from the structure was scattered into a wooded area. A small outbuilding was also destroyed, and many trees were snapped. Just past this area, it quickly reached its peak strength of mid-range EF3 at County Road 1203, where a house was completely swept away and debris from the residence was scattered into a field. While the house was reduced to a bare foundation slab, it was poorly anchored, and winds at this location were estimated at 155 mph (249 km/h). Another house in this area was unroofed and sustained some loss of exterior walls, and damage to that home was rated EF2. The tornado then weakened to EF1 strength as it approached and then crossed over SH 11, where an RV was overturned, a frail home suffered extensive damage, and trees were downed. Additional EF1 damage to trees and an outbuilding occurred farther to the northeast. As the tornado began crossing SH 49 northwest of Daingerfield, it intensified to mid-range EF2 strength as it snapped power poles and completely destroyed two poorly constructed pier-foundation homes, both of which were leveled and swept away. Intensifying further and reaching a width of 0.5 mi (0.80 km), the tornado reached low-end EF3 strength as it moved through a nearby grove of trees. Trees in this area were snapped and denuded, several of which sustained some debarking.

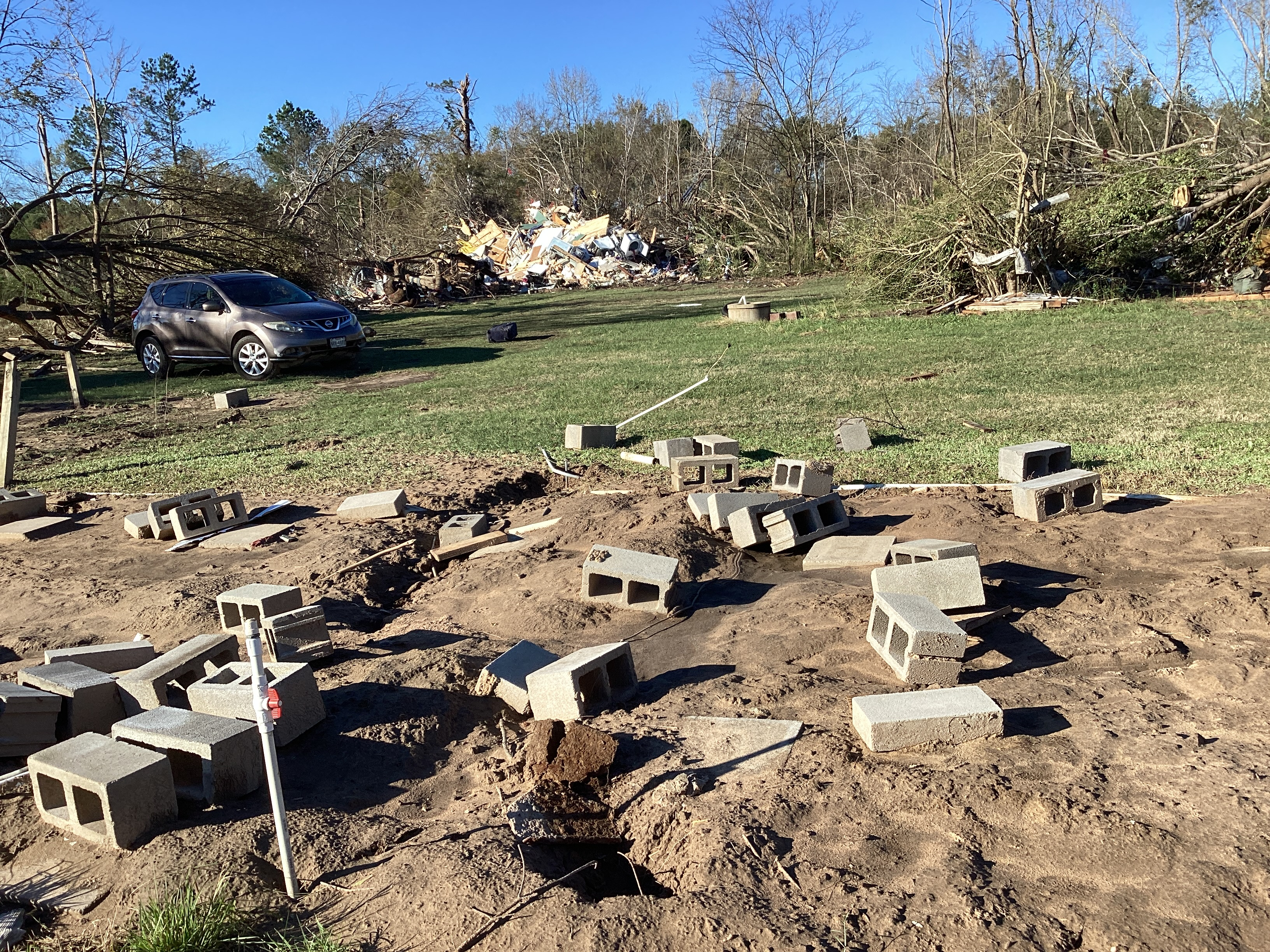
EF2 damage to a mobile home, where one fatality occurred.

As the tornado continued to the northeast, it weakened slightly to high-end EF2 strength as it crossed County Road 3201, where an anchored mobile home was completely destroyed, killing one occupant. Debris from the mobile home was thrown 200 ft (61 m) away. Hardwood trees were snapped next to this residence, and another mobile home was also destroyed at mid-range EF2 strength nearby. The tornado then weakened and produced mainly EF1 damage as it approached and crossed US 259, though a small pocket of EF2 damage was noted near County Road 3207, where a couple of metal truss electrical transmission towers were blown over. Numerous trees were downed, a mobile home was pushed off its foundation, and other homes and outbuildings sustained minor damage along this segment of the path. After it crossed over US 259, a final area of significant damage occurred just to the east of the Greater Morris County Airport, as multiple large trees were snapped at low-end EF2 strength along SH 338. A one-story home and a metal garage structure within the vicinity sustained EF1 damage. The tornado then caused additional EF0 to EF1 tree damage as it passed southeast of Naples and moved into Cass County. More EF0 to EF1 tree damage was observed to the east of Naples before the tornado dissipated immediately after moving across SH 77.

The tornado was on the ground for 16.95 mi (27.28 km) and had a peak width was estimated at 650 yd (590 m). In addition to the fatality, eight other people were injured. The supercell produced another EF3 tornado shortly after this one dissipated.

=== Simms–New Boston, Texas ===
Simms–New Boston, Texas
- The tornado as it approached Simms, Texas.

Meteorological history
- Formed: November 4, 2022, 7:21 p.m. CDT (UTC−05:00)
- Dissipated: November 4, 2022, 7:38 p.m. CDT
- Duration: 21 minutes

EF3 tornado
- on the Enhanced Fujita scale
- Highest winds: 140 mph (230 km/h)

Overall effects
- Fatalities: 0
- Injuries: 0
- Damage: $7 million (2022 USD)

Shortly after the dissipation of the Cason–Naples, Texas EF3 tornado listed above, the same supercell produced another strong wedge tornado southwest of Simms that inflicted significant damage along a 15.68 mi (25.23 km) path. As the tornado touched down along US 67 and tracked northeastward, it snapped numerous trees and tree branches. An outbuilding was damaged, a power pole was snapped, and damage along this initial segment of the path was rated EF0 to EF1. About 2.3 miles (3.7 km) to the northeast, the tornado intensified into a low-end EF2 as it crossed County Road 4213 to the west of Simms. Around this area, multiple trees and wooden power poles were snapped, a small outbuilding was completely destroyed, while an RV trailer and a metal storage container were rolled 50 ft (15 m). A couple of homes suffered roof and window damage as well. While tracking northeastward, the tornado crossed County Road 4121 and intensified to mid-range EF2 strength, completely destroying a double-wide manufactured home. A small outbuilding was destroyed nearby, and damage to that structure was rated low-end EF2. The tornado intensified further and continued moving to the northeast, causing low-end EF3 damage at the intersection of FM 561 and County Road 4120 to the north-northwest of Simms. A one-story home sustained total roof loss and collapse of exterior walls, and a small section of asphalt was scoured from FM 561 and thrown into the house. Winds in the area were estimated at 140 mph (230 km/h). Widespread EF2 damage occurred surrounding this smaller area of EF3 damage, as a well-built brick home had its roof torn off, another house was partially unroofed, while a horse stable and a metal outbuilding were destroyed. A double-wide manufactured home in this area was shifted off its foundation by several feet, and a tree falling on the home saved it from being blown away, leaving the occupants without serious injuries. As the tornado continued northeast of the intersection, it destroyed another outbuilding at low-end EF2 strength before weakening considerably.

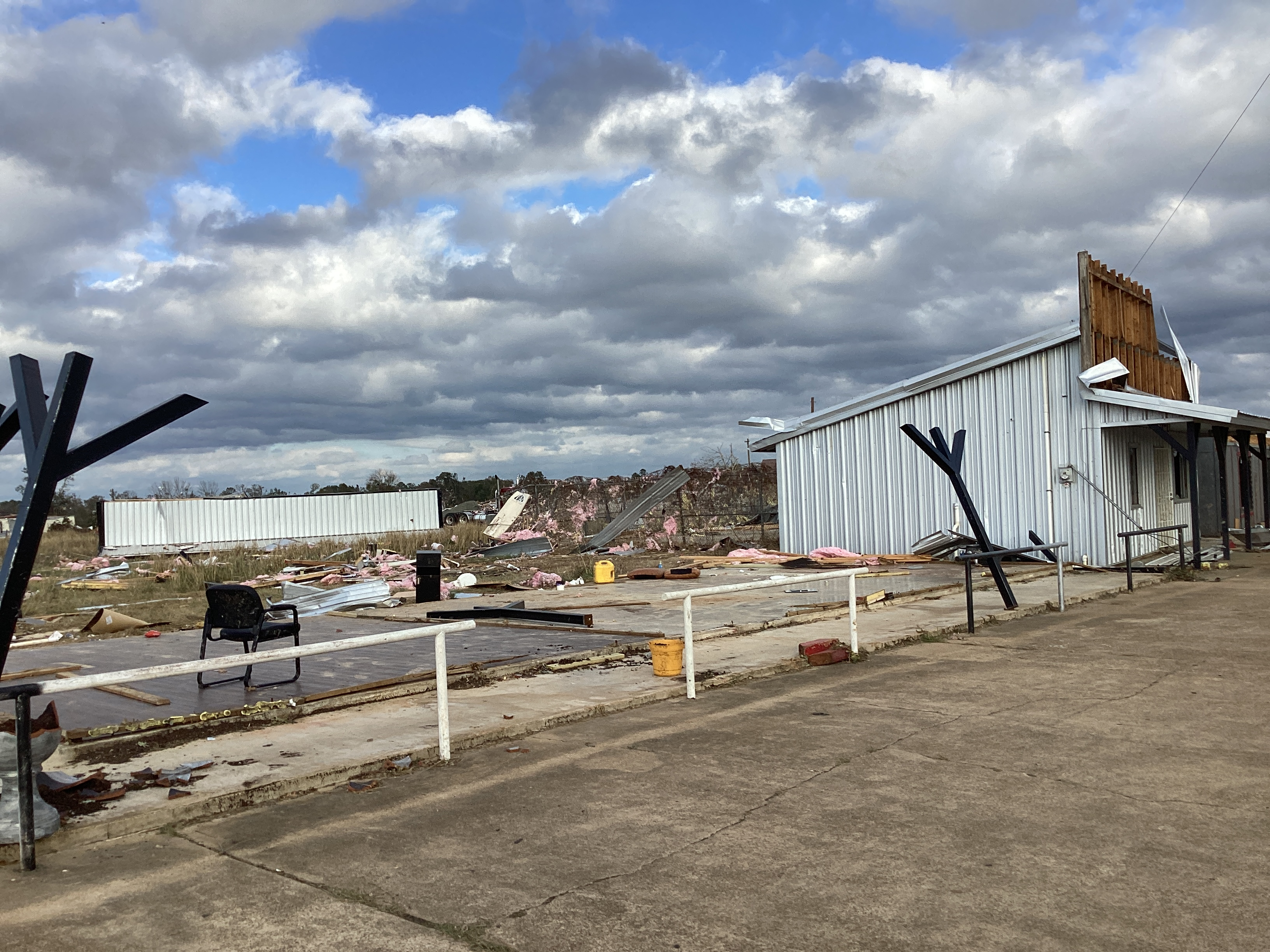
Low-end EF3 damage to a small business near New Boston, Texas.

Following SH 98 to the north-northeast, the tornado produced EF0 to EF1 tree damage near the Barry Telford Unit. It then rapidly intensified to low-end EF3 strength for a second time as it moved through the intersection of SH 98 and FM 1840, where a small business was obliterated and swept from its foundation, with winds at this location estimated at 140 mph (230 km/h). The tornado inflicted mainly EF2 damage elsewhere at the intersection as a gun shop and some homes were unroofed, one house was shifted off its foundation and left with only interior walls standing, some metal buildings were heavily damaged, while outbuildings and large garages were completely destroyed. A church and some other houses had partial roof loss within this vicinity as well, and a mobile home was pushed off its blocks and heavily damaged. The tornado weakened down to EF1 strength as it moved to the northeast, causing widespread tree damage and damaging a couple of houses, one of which suffered extensive damage to its roof structure. Around County Road 4001 and Deerfield Lane, the tornado became strong again and inflicted mid-range EF2 damage to a house, which had much of its roof removed and sustained some collapse of exterior walls. It then weakened to an EF1 again and clipped the western outskirts of New Boston, crossing US 82 and I-30 in the process. A few homes in this area sustained considerable roof damage, and many trees were snapped or uprooted. North of I-30, the tornado briefly became strong one final time as it completely destroyed a shop building at mid-range EF2 strength while inflicting EF1 damage to a nearby home. The tornado quickly weakened back to EF1 strength and continued a little further northeast near New Boston Middle School, crossing County Road 3009 and snapping some trees before dissipating. The tornado maintained a large width for the majority of its lifespan, with its peak width reaching 800 yards (730 m). No serious injuries or fatalities occurred as a result of this tornado.

== Non-tornadic effects ==
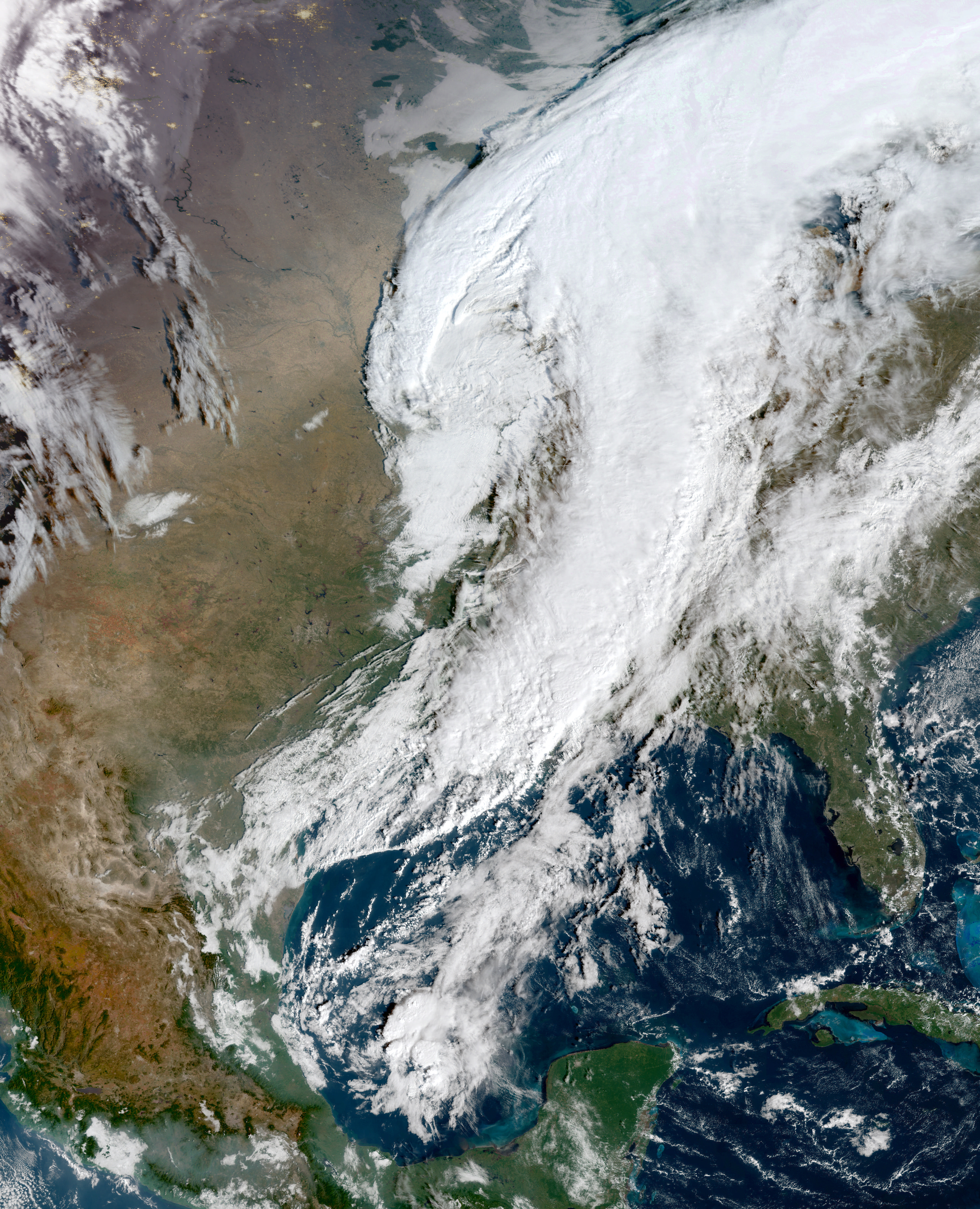
The extratropical cyclone was responsible for a severe weather outbreak in the states of Texas, Oklahoma, Arkansas, and Louisiana on November 4. The remnants of Hurricane Lisa can be seen to the south.

The same storm that produced the tornadoes also produced a winter storm on the backend. In Denver, a 100-car pileup relating to the first snow of the season forced 6th Avenue to close. The crash led to 13 injuries, one of which was serious. The snowstorm also resulted in Interstate 70 shutting down near Vail. The peak amount of snow fell in Longs Peak, at 12 in (30 cm). In Amarillo, Texas, the temperature dropped to 35 °F (2 °C), allowing for rare early-season snowflakes. Near Stilwell, Oklahoma, flooding resulted in a fatality from drowning after a person was swept off a road. Heavy rain in Kansas City accumulated to at least 2.82 in (72 mm), with 2.43 in (62 mm) falling on November 4 alone, making it the 5th wettest November day on record in the city. Des Moines, Iowa also set a daily rainfall record at 1.65 in (42 mm). Further east, in Wisconsin, hail of up to 0.75 inches (1.9 cm) fell, while in Illinois a strongly forced line of showers along the cold front produced wind gusts reaching 80 miles per hour (130 km/h).

== Impact ==
Over 600 flights were cancelled. 55,000 customers lost power in Texas, in addition to 21,000 outages in Louisiana and 12,000 outages in Arkansas. Amtrak's northbound Texas Eagle was forced to stop north of McGregor, Texas due to severe warnings along its route on November 4. The train was delayed for four hours before it was allowed to continue northward. An Oklahoma Mesonet station near Idabel was narrowly missed by the EF4 tornado that passed through the town, while detecting a drop in pressure that directly coincided with a 108 mph (174 km/h) wind gust.

== See also ==
- Weather of 2022
- List of North American tornadoes and tornado outbreaks
- List of F4 and EF4 tornadoes
  - List of F4 and EF4 tornadoes (2020–present)
