= Bright Star, Rains County, Texas =

Bright Star
- Unincorporated community
- Bright Star
- Interactive map of Bright Star
- Location within Texas Bright Star (the United States)
- Country: United States
- State: Texas
- County: Rains County

Bright Star is a populated, unincorporated rural place located in Farm Road 2795, Rains County, Texas, United States, 6 miles (9.7 kilometers) southeast from Emory.

== History ==
Previously known with the name "Locust Prairie", Bright Star was founded during the Civil War. During the 1930s it had a population of 50 alongside a church, a school, and two businesses, but both the school and businesses would shut down after World War II. The population increased to 75 in 1990, and exponentially grew to 592 in 2000.
