= November 2022 tornado outbreak =

November 2022 tornado outbreak may refer to:

- Tornado outbreak of November 4–5, 2022
- Tornado outbreak of November 29–30, 2022
