= National Register of Historic Places listings in Rains County, Texas =

Location of Rains County in Texas

This is a list of the National Register of Historic Places listings in Rains County, Texas.

This is intended to be a complete list of properties listed on the National Register of Historic Places in Rains County, Texas. There are four properties listed on the National Register in the county including one site that is both a State Antiquities Landmark and a Recorded Texas Historic Landmark.

This National Park Service list is complete through NPS recent listings posted March 21, 2025.

== Current listings ==
The publicly disclosed locations of National Register properties may be seen in a mapping service provided.

	Name on the Register	Image	Date listed	Location	City or town	Description
1	Gilbert Site	Gilbert Site	April 13, 1977 (#77001469)	Address restricted	Emory	
2	Koons Site	Koons Site	April 13, 1977 (#77001470)	Address restricted	Emory	
3	Rains County Courthouse	Rains County Courthouse	May 1, 2003 (#03000333)	100 E Quitman St. 32°52′28″N 95°45′53″W	Emory	State Antiquities Landmark, Recorded Texas Historic Landmark
4	Yandell Site	Yandell Site	April 13, 1977 (#77001471)	Address restricted	Emory	

== See also ==
- National Register of Historic Places listings in Texas
- Recorded Texas Historic Landmarks in Rains County
