= Caviness, Texas =

Unincorporated community in Lamar County, Texas

Coordinates: 33°45′28″N 95°36′48″W

Caviness is an unincorporated community in Lamar County, Texas, United States. In the 1990s, the population of the community was 80 and a town hall was built. In 2009, the population of the community was 90. On November 4, 2022, Caviness was devastated by a violent EF4 tornado with winds reaching 170 miles per hour (270 km/h). Numerous structures were completely destroyed, and some were completely swept away.
