= Greenville Club Lake =

Lake in Texas, United States

Lake Waxahachie
- Location within Texas Location within the United States
- Interactive map of Lake Waxahachie
- Location: Hunt County, Texas
- Coordinates: 33°01′25.1″N 96°01′56.3″W
- Type: Reservoir
- Primary inflows: Cedar Creek
- Basin countries: United States
- Managing agency: City of Greenville
- First flooded: 1922
- Surface area: 305 acres (123 ha)
- Surface elevation: 535 feet (163 m)
- Settlements: Greenville, Texas
- References: U.S. Geological Survey Geographic Names Information System: Greenville Club Lake

Greenville Club Lake is a lake located south of Greenville, Texas, and north of Lake Tawakoni in Texas.
