= Rains Independent School District =

Public school in Texas, USA

Location
- Emory, Texas United States

District information
- Type: Public School
- Grades: PK-12
- Superintendent: Joe Nicks

Students and staff
- Athletic conference: UIL Class 3A
- District mascot: Wildcats
- Colors: Blue & White

Rains Independent School District is a public school district based in Emory, Texas, United States. In addition to Emory, the district serves most of Rains County, including the cities of Point and East Tawakoni.

In 2009, the school district was rated "recognized" by the Texas Education Agency.

== Schools ==
- Rains High School (grades 9-12)
- Rains Junior High School (grades 6-8)
- Rains Intermediate School (grades 4-5)
- Rains Elementary School (prekindergarten-grade 3)

== Athletics ==
The Rains Wildcats compete in cross-country running, volleyball, football, basketball, powerlifting, baseball, softball, track and field, tennis, and golf.

=== State titles ===
- Softball - 2019 (3A), 2021 (3A)

== See also ==
- List of school districts in Texas
