= Sanders Creek (Red River tributary) =

Coordinates: 33°52′50.38″N 95°30′22.85″W

Sanders Creek is a 23-mile-long (37 km) waterway in Lamar County, Texas, United States, near Paris, Texas. It is a tributary of the Red River.

It is the primary inflow of Pat Mayse Lake. It contains several species of catfish and gar, largemouth bass, carp, bowfin, buffalo, pickerel and various other local species of freshwater fish. It is also the primary outflow (locally termed spillway) of Pat Mayse Lake. The outflow section of the creek contains species of fish such as gar, buffalo, catfish, paddlefish, striped bass, which make their way to this point via the Red River, and several other species of local freshwater fish. Sanders Creek is also one of only two creeks in Texas which contains the Ouachita rock pocketbook, a federally endangered freshwater mussel.

== See also ==
- List of rivers of Texas
