= Midcity, Texas =

Unincorporated community in Texas, US

Coordinates: 33°50′32″N 95°30′52″W

Midcity is an unincorporated community in Lamar County, Texas, United States. According to the Handbook of Texas, the community had an estimated population of 50 in 2000. On November 4, 2022, Midcity was hit by a violent EF4 tornado (albeit at EF3 strength).

Public education in the community of Midcity is provided by the North Lamar Independent School District.
