= Emory Rains =

Lawyer, judge, and political leader in the Republic of Texas

Emory Rains (May 4, 1800 – March 4, 1878) was a lawyer, judge and political leader in the Republic of Texas and thereafter in the State of Texas.

Rains was born in Warren County, Tennessee, and moved to Texas in 1817. Rains held many public offices and his life was devoted to public service. Rains was a Member of Texas Republic Senate from the District of Shelby and Sabine (1837–1839); a delegate to the Texas state constitutional convention (1845); a member of the Texas state house of representatives (1847–1848, 1851–1854); a member of the Texas state senate (1859). In 1839, Rains was a prime supporter of the historic law creating a Homestead exemption in Texas. In 1861, he stood with Sam Houston in opposition to secession from the union. In 1866, Emory Rains rode a mule to Austin, Texas, for the purpose of getting a bill introduced to create Rains County, Texas.

Rains died on March 4, 1878, of an apparent stroke, and is buried in the City Cemetery in Emory, Texas.

Both Emory, Texas, and Rains County, Texas are named for him. His brother, James S. Rains, would later become involved with the Greenback Party and run for Texas lieutenant governor.

Texas Senate
Preceded by Jonathan Russell	Texas State Senator from District 6; 1859–1861	Succeeded by Matthew Fielding Locke
