= Acworth, Texas =

Unincorporated community in Texas, US

Acworth
- Unincorporated community
- Location within Texas
- Coordinates: 33.7742750°N 94.9496656°W
- Country: United States
- State: Texas
- County: Red River
- Named for: Acworth, Georgia
- Elevation: 390 ft (120 m)

Acworth is an unincorporated community in Red River County, Texas, United States. It was settled in 1902, by J. H. Cox, who named the community after his old home of Acworth, Georgia. A post office operated there from 1902 to 1956. Its population in 1910 was 10, and the population stayed at 20 from 1940 to 1986. In 2000, it rose to 52.
