= Powderly, Texas =

Census-designated place in Lamar County, Texas, United States

- Census-designated place
- Location in Texas Location in the United States
- Coordinates: 33°48′40″N 95°29′38″W
- Country: United States
- State: Texas
- County: Lamar

Area
  - Total: 7.44 sq mi (19.27 km^{2})
  - Land: 7.25 sq mi (18.79 km^{2})
  - Water: 0.19 sq mi (0.48 km^{2})
- Elevation: 509 ft (155 m)

Population (2010)
  - Total: 1,178
  - Density: 162/sq mi (62.7/km^{2})
- Time zone: UTC-6 (Central (CST))
  - Summer (DST): UTC-5 (CDT)
- Area codes: 903, 430
- FIPS code: 48-59156
- GNIS feature ID: 2586974

Powderly is a census-designated place (CDP) in Lamar County, Texas, United States. As of the 2020 census, Powderly had a population of 1,261.

== History ==
Powderly was settled around the time of the Civil War and was originally known as "Lenoir". When the St. Louis-San Francisco Railway was built through the area in the 1880s, the community was renamed "Powderly" in honor of Terence V. Powderly, a labor leader and later a commissioner of immigration in the McKinley administration.

A post office was established in 1888, and by 1890, the town had a general store, two cotton gins, a gristmill, a sawmill, a blacksmith, and an estimated population of 30. In 1914, the town's population was 100. During the 1920s, however, the community declined; in the early 1930s, Powderly had a church, a school, six rated businesses, and a reported 63 residents. Since that time, the population has increased, reaching 120 in 1950 and 150 in 1965. In 1964, the Powderly Volunteer Fire Department was established, which has served the community with excellence and continues to serve the community to this day. In 1990, Powderly had a church, a school, a number of houses, and an estimated population of 185. The population remained the same in 2000. In 2010, the Powderly census-designated place included land east of the traditional townsite and reported a much larger population, at 1,178. On November 4, 2022, Powderly was hit by a violent EF4 tornado.

== Geography ==
Powderly is located on U.S. Highway 271, 10 miles (16 km) north of Paris in north-central Lamar County. It is 5 miles (8 km) south of Highway 271's crossing of the Red River at the Oklahoma border.

According to the U.S. Census Bureau, the Powderly CDP has a total area of 7.5 square miles (19.3 km^{2}), of which 0.2 square miles (0.5 km^{2}), or 2.49%, is covered by water. The center of town is on a low ridge, draining west to Pat Mayse Lake and east to Pine Creek, a tributary of the Red River.

== Demographics ==
Historical population
Census	Pop.	Note	%±
2010	1,178		—
2020	1,261		7.0%
U.S. Decennial Census; 1850–1900 1910; 1920 1930 1940; 1950 1960 1970; 1980 1990 2000; 2010 2020

Powderly first appeared as a census-designated place in the 2010 U.S. census.

Powderly CDP, Texas – Racial and ethnic composition Note: the US Census treats Hispanic/Latino as an ethnic category. This table excludes Latinos from the racial categories and assigns them to a separate category. Hispanics/Latinos may be of any race.
Race / Ethnicity (NH = Non-Hispanic)	Pop 2010	Pop 2020	% 2010	% 2020
White alone (NH)	1,091	1,059	92.61%	83.98%
Black or African American alone (NH)	17	47	1.44%	3.73%
Native American or Alaska Native alone (NH)	24	23	2.04%	1.82%
Asian alone (NH)	1	0	0.08%	0.00%
Native Hawaiian or Pacific Islander alone (NH)	0	0	0.00%	0.00%
Other race alone (NH)	0	0	0.00%	0.00%
Mixed race or multiracial (NH)	19	77	1.61%	6.11%
Hispanic or Latino (any race)	26	55	2.21%	4.36%
Total	1,178	1,261	100.00%	100.00%

== Camp Maxey ==
Camp Maxey Texas Army National Guard training facility, 8 miles (13 km) north of Paris, is located in north-central Lamar County, along the southwest side of Powderly. The installation serves as a training center for the Texas National Guard, and most of the original buildings were demolished or sold and removed; in 1990, the camp's sewage treatment plant was used by the city of Paris.

Camp Maxey, originally a World War II infantry-training camp, was named in honor of Samuel Bell Maxey, a brigadier general in the Confederate States Army. It was activated on July 15, 1942, under the command of Col. C. H. Palmer. The first division to be trained at the camp, the 102d Infantry Division, was organized and activated on September 15, 1942, under Gen. John B. Anderson. Col. Robert C. Annin succeeded Palmer as commander on March 25, 1943. In addition to the army ground forces trained at Camp Maxey, army service forces and army air forces played a role in the development of camp activities. The varied terrain provided facilities for working out problems of infantry training to meet modern battle conditions. An artillery range, obstacle course, infiltration course, and "German village" were included in training maneuvers. Troop capacity was 44,931. The camp was put on an inactive status on October 1, 1945.

Most of Camp Maxey is centered on the Pat Mayse Lake Project, a popular recreational facility with activities such as swimming, boating, fishing and camping. When Pat Mayse Lake was constructed, parts of the northern edge of the base were inundated. The damsite is on Sanders Creek (a tributary of the Red River) approximately one mile south of the town of Chicota, 4 miles (6 km) northwest of Powderly and 13 miles (21 km) north of Paris. Pat Mayse Lake is a 6,000-acre (24 km^{2}) reservoir built and maintained by the US Army Corps of Engineers. Surrounded by 15,000 acres (61 km^{2}) of wooded land, it offers campgrounds with 200 sites providing water and electricity. The Army Corps of Engineers operates four recreational areas at the lake. Facilities in these areas include boat ramps, campsites, restrooms, swimming beaches, and trailer dump stations. Shorebank access is also available in the reservoir's tailrace area. A large number of personnel frequent the lake yearly.

Pat Mayse Lake provides excellent opportunities for fishing and hunting. Sport fish species in the lake include largemouth bass, white crappie, sunfish, striped bass, channel and flathead catfish, and other common fish species. These lands are managed for upland game and whitetail deer and are open as a public hunting area. The game species present include deer, fox squirrel, gray squirrel, bobwhite quail, mourning dove, cottontail rabbit, raccoon, turkey and fox.

During the ordnance and explosives removal activities at the former Camp Maxey, extreme measures were taken to inform the public of the UXO removal operations in progress. A safety exclusion zone was established at 450 feet (140 m) around both areas. The exclusion zone was controlled during this removal action by the use of road barriers and signs. Pat Mayse Lake staff was notified on a daily basis whenever barriers would block roads or road accesses. Numerous times, unauthorized personnel ignored the road barriers and entered the exclusion zone. Removal operations would cease for safety considerations to clear the exclusion zone.

== Education ==
The North Lamar Independent School District serves area students.

The Texas Education Code specifies that all of Lamar County is in the service area of Paris Junior College.

== Gallery ==
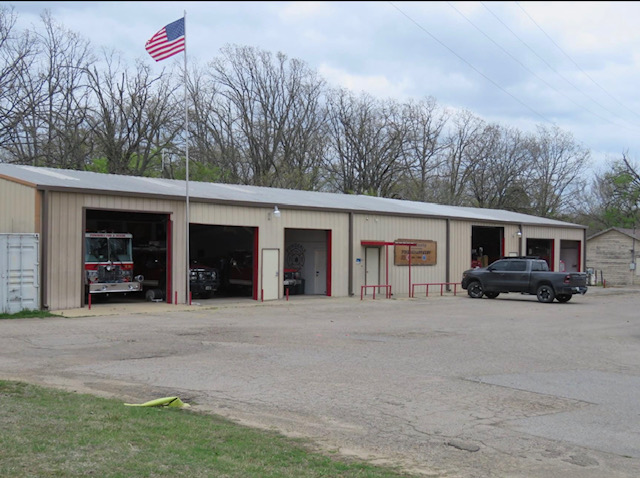
Powderly Fire Department

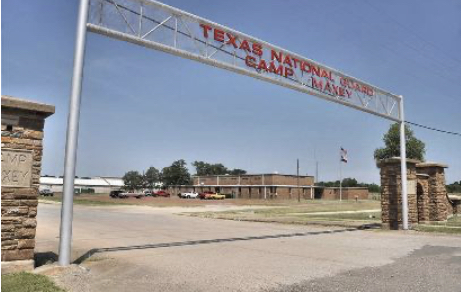
Texas National Guard

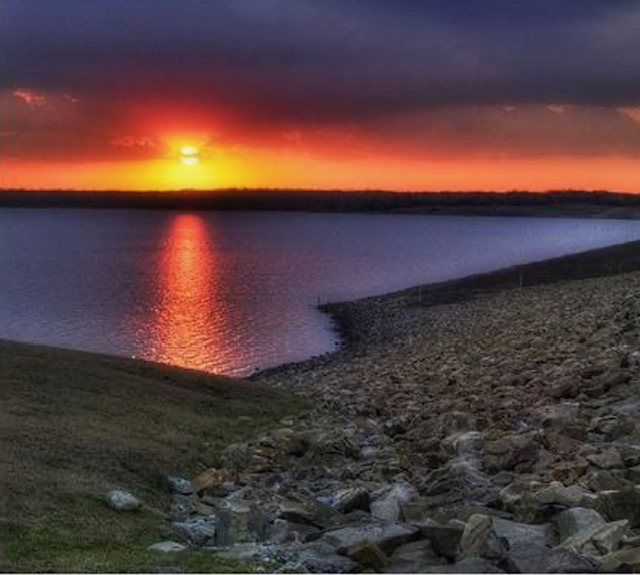
Pat Mayse Lake Dam

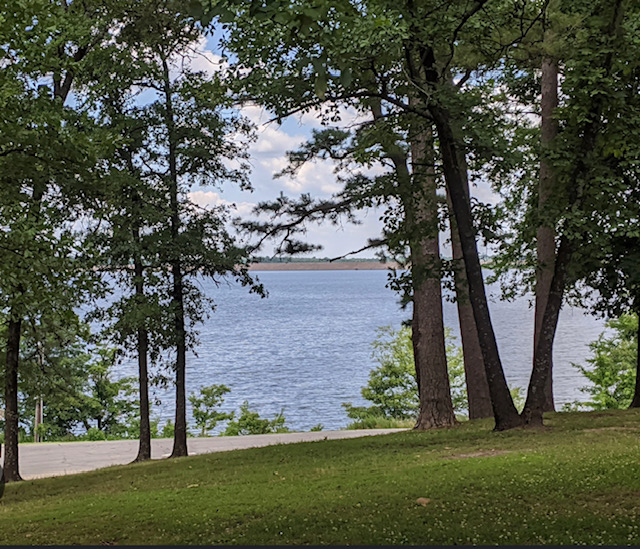
Pat Mayse Lake

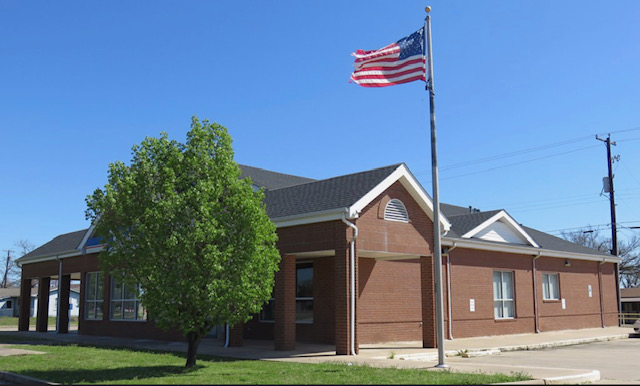
Powderly Post Office

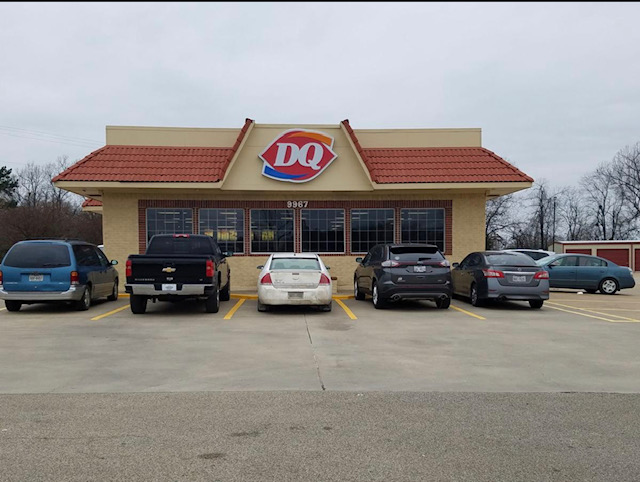
Dairy Queen

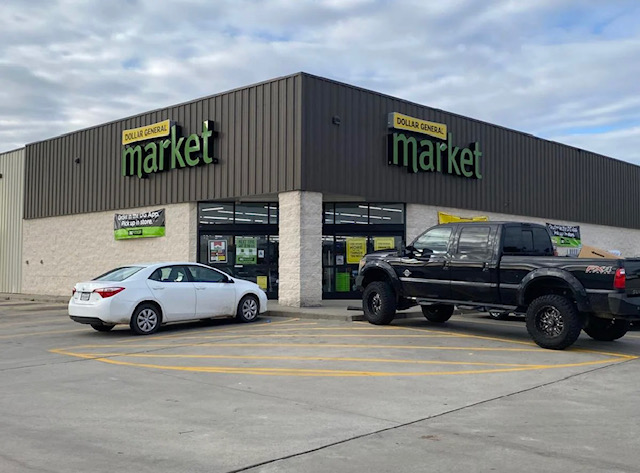
Dollar General Market

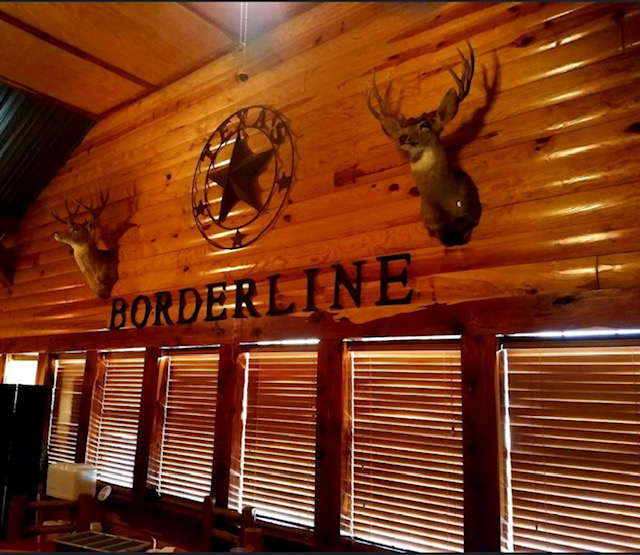
Borderline Steakhouse

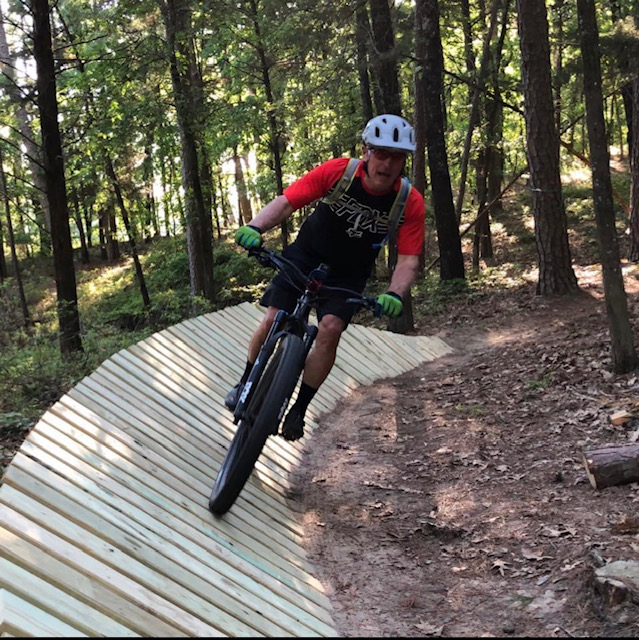
Barber Hills Mountain Bike and Hiking Trails

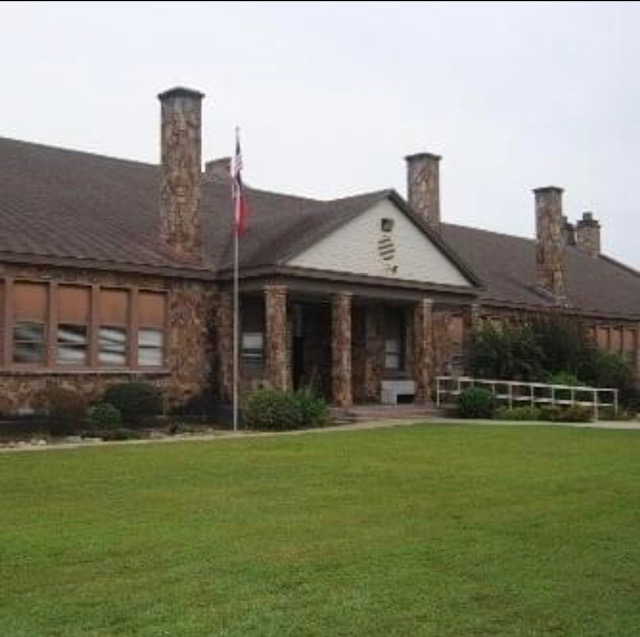
Arron Parker Elementary School

== See also ==
- List of census-designated places in Texas
