= East Tawakoni, Texas =

- City
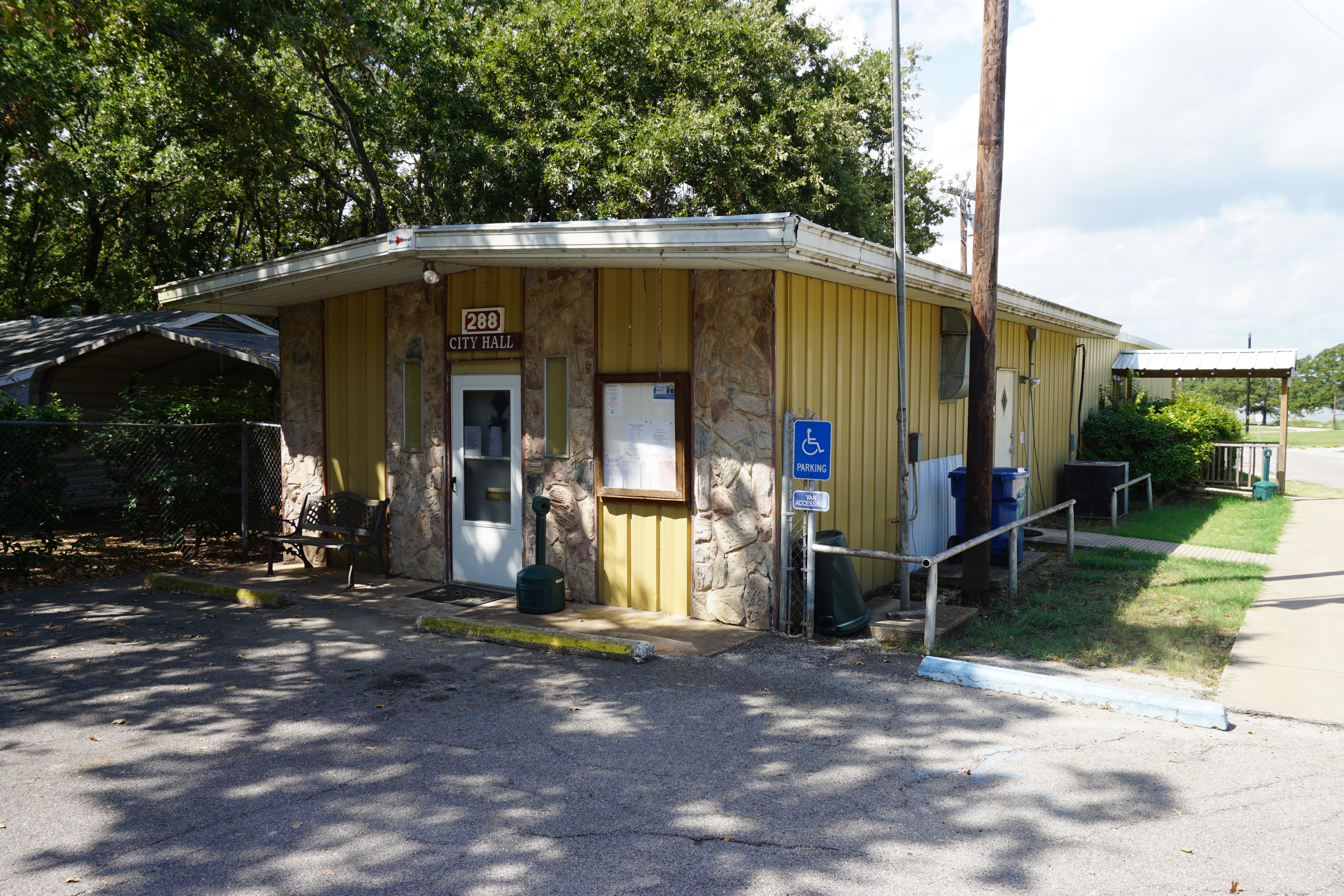
- East Tawakoni City Hall and Civic Center

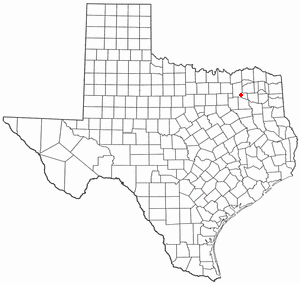
- Location of East Tawakoni, Texas

- Coordinates: 32°53′05″N 95°56′03″W
- Country: United States
- State: Texas
- County: Rains

Area
  - Total: 1.83 sq mi (4.75 km^{2})
  - Land: 1.78 sq mi (4.62 km^{2})
  - Water: 0.050 sq mi (0.13 km^{2})
- Elevation: 466 ft (142 m)

Population (2020)
  - Total: 824
  - Density: 462/sq mi (178/km^{2})
- Time zone: UTC-6 (Central (CST))
  - Summer (DST): UTC-5 (CDT)
- FIPS code: 48-22276
- GNIS feature ID: 2410390
- Website: http://cityofeasttawakoni.com/

East Tawakoni (/təˈwɑːkəni/ tə-WAH-kə-nee) is a city in Rains County, Texas, United States. The population was 824 at the 2020 census. East Tawakoni is located on the east side of Lake Tawakoni, while its twin city West Tawakoni is located on the west side of the lake.

== History ==
Marketed as a relaxed rural community with easy access to Dallas, East Tawakoni was established on June 6, 1967, after an election in which 30 of 45 residents voted in favor of incorporation. A mayor (Grady A. Whitehead) and five aldermen (Raymond Briggs, A.L. Williams, D.A. "Doc" Vincent, A.O. Murphrey, and T.E. Bell) were elected on June 27, 1967. In a local option election held on February 6, 1968, residents voted 38–32 (54.3%–45.7%) in favor of selling alcoholic beverages. The move ended more than 60 years of Rains County being wholly "dry". East Tawakoni had a population of 278 in 1970. That same year, a fire destroyed the city hall building and all of its records. City officials met in the garage of a local resident until a new building was constructed. The annexation of the Blue Heron Cove subdivision in 1986 doubled the size of East Tawakoni. By 1990, the city was home to 542 people. The population grew to 775 in 2000, a 43 percent increase over the 1990 figure.

== Geography ==
East Tawakoni is located along State Highway 276 in western Rains County. It is situated on the eastern shore of Lake Tawakoni, nine miles west of Emory.

According to the United States Census Bureau, the city has a total area of 1.9 square miles (4.9 km^{2}), of which 1.8 square miles (4.7 km^{2}) is land and 0.04 square miles (0.10 km^{2}) (2.16%) is water.

== Demographics ==
Historical population
Census	Pop.	Note	%±
1970	278		—
1980	404		45.3%
1990	642		58.9%
2000	775		20.7%
2010	883		13.9%
2020	824		−6.7%
U.S. Decennial Census

=== 2020 census ===
As of the 2020 census, East Tawakoni had a population of 824, 365 households, and 183 families residing in the city. The median age was 49.2 years, with 19.5% of residents under the age of 18 and 22.0% aged 65 or older. For every 100 females there were 103.5 males, and for every 100 females age 18 and over there were 100.9 males age 18 and over.

0.0% of residents lived in urban areas, while 100.0% lived in rural areas.

There were 365 households in East Tawakoni, of which 23.3% had children under the age of 18 living in them. Of all households, 47.7% were married-couple households, 22.7% were households with a male householder and no spouse or partner present, and 19.2% were households with a female householder and no spouse or partner present. About 27.1% of all households were made up of individuals and 12.1% had someone living alone who was 65 years of age or older.

There were 438 housing units, of which 16.7% were vacant. The homeowner vacancy rate was 2.0% and the rental vacancy rate was 1.4%.

Racial composition as of the 2020 census
Race	Number	Percent
White	725	88.0%
Black or African American	7	0.8%
American Indian and Alaska Native	13	1.6%
Asian	15	1.8%
Native Hawaiian and Other Pacific Islander	1	0.1%
Some other race	16	1.9%
Two or more races	47	5.7%
Hispanic or Latino (of any race)	50	6.1%

== Education ==
The City of East Tawakoni is served by the Rains Independent School District.
