= Pat Mayse Lake =

- Location within Texas Location within the United States
- Location: Lamar County, Texas
- Coordinates: 33°51′13″N 95°33′11″W
- Type: reservoir
- Primary inflows: Sanders Creek
- Primary outflows: Sanders Creek
- Basin countries: United States
- Surface elevation: 451 ft (137 m)

Pat Mayse Lake is a reservoir in the Prairies and Lakes region of Texas, United States. It is in Lamar County near the towns of Chicota and Powderly. Paris, Texas is the nearest major city.

The lake is managed by the United States Army Corps of Engineers. It is stocked with largemouth bass, white crappie, sunfish, striped bass, channel and flathead catfish, and other common fish species. Nearby hunting areas are also managed for upland game and whitetail deer and are open to the public. The game species present include deer, fox squirrel, gray squirrel, bobwhite quail, morning dove, cottontail rabbit, raccoon, turkey, and fox. Furbearers such as opossum, beaver, mink, skunk, and nutria are also present.

Pat Mayse is the site of the "2 of Us - North Region" fishing tournament held annually in early June. It is also the location for the annual "Uncle Jesse's Big Bass" tournament.
