= Lake Tawakoni =

Lake in Texas, United States

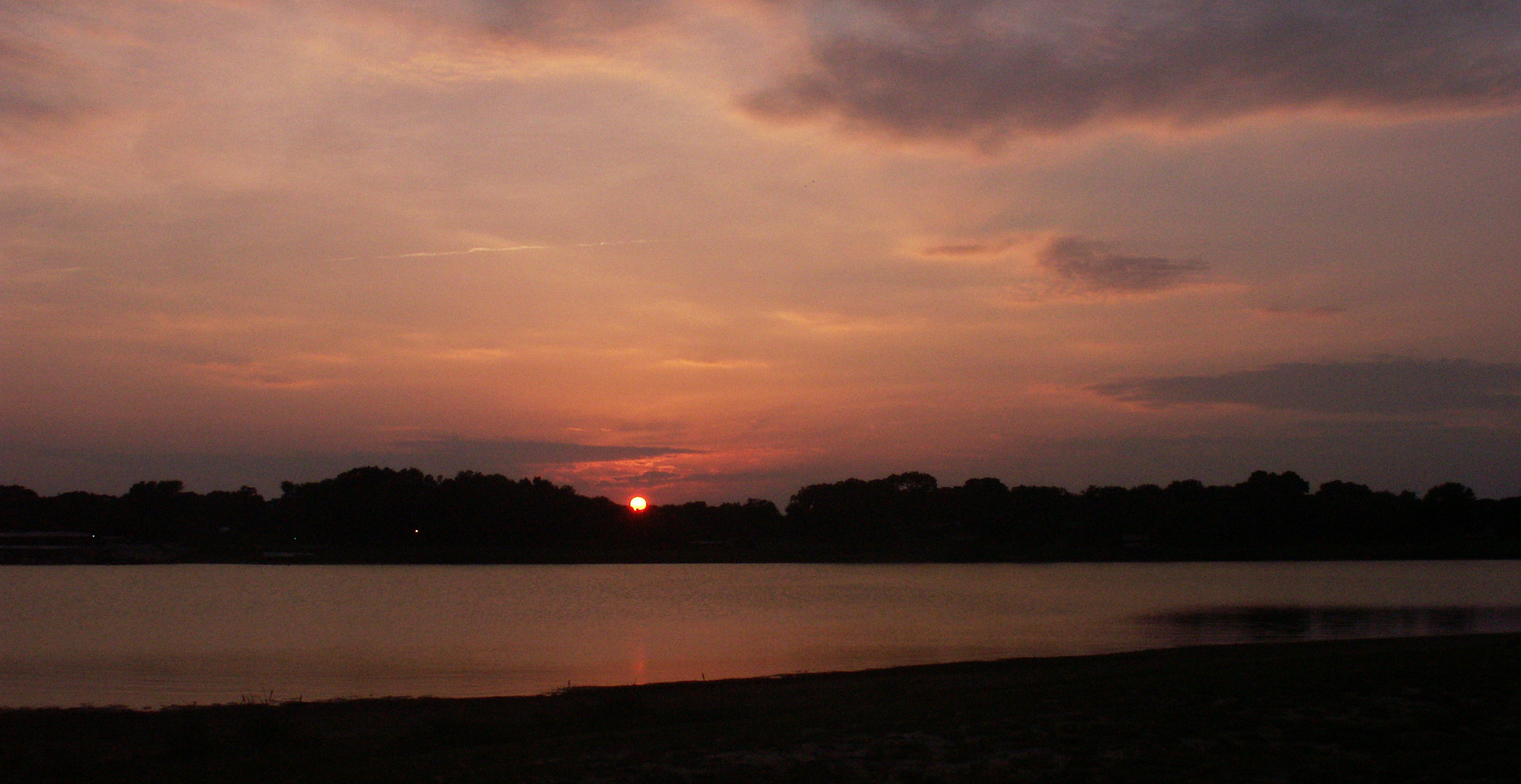
- Sunset over Duck Cove

- Location within Texas Location within the United States
- Location: Hunt / Rains / Van Zandt Counties, Texas
- Coordinates: 32°50′45″N 95°56′36″W
- Type: reservoir
- Basin countries: United States
- Managing agency: Sabine River Authority of Texas
- First flooded: October 1960
- Surface area: 37,879 acres (15,329 ha)
- Water volume: 926,000 acre⋅ft (1.142×10^{9} m^{3})
- Shore length^{1}: 200 mi (320 km)
- Surface elevation: 437.5 ft (133.4 m)
- ^{1} Shore length is not a well-defined measure.

Lake Tawakoni (/təˈwɑːkəni/ tə-WAH-kə-nee) is a 37,879-acre (15,329 ha) reservoir located in Northeast Texas, about 48 miles (77 km) east of Dallas. It lies within three Texas counties, Hunt, Rains, and Van Zandt. It is used for water supply and recreation. It is under the Sabine River Authority of Texas and the original headwaters of the Sabine are converged under the lake surface.

== Etymology ==
The lake was named for the Tawakoni Native American peoples, who were a larger part of the Caddo Nation. The Caddos inhabited a large swath of North and East Texas, including where the lake is located.

== History ==
The reservoir was constructed in 1960 with the Iron Bridge Dam. The area was chosen due to its location to the growing Dallas area and the growth east of the city and its respective suburbs. The South Fork, Cowleech Fork, and Caddo Forks that all formed the Sabine River headwaters are now submerged under the lake and the lake now serves as the headwaters of the Sabine. It covers 37,879 acres (15,329 ha) and has a storage capacity of 926,000 acre-feet (1.142×10^{9} m^{3}) at conservation pool level. It is owned by the Sabine River Authority of Texas.

== Flora and fauna ==
The lake has a diverse array of wildlife. It features deer, feral hogs, snakes, raccoons, bobcats, and over 200 species of birds. Sightings of the American alligator in certain areas of the lake have not been uncommon. The lake mainly has post oak hardwood timber and plants native to the Texas Blackland Prairies. In the summer of 2007, Lake Tawakoni State Park was the site of a large, rare spider web. The web stretched over a 200-yard path and attracted considerable attention from entomologists. The smaller Greenville Club Lake is situated north of the lake.

== Gallery ==
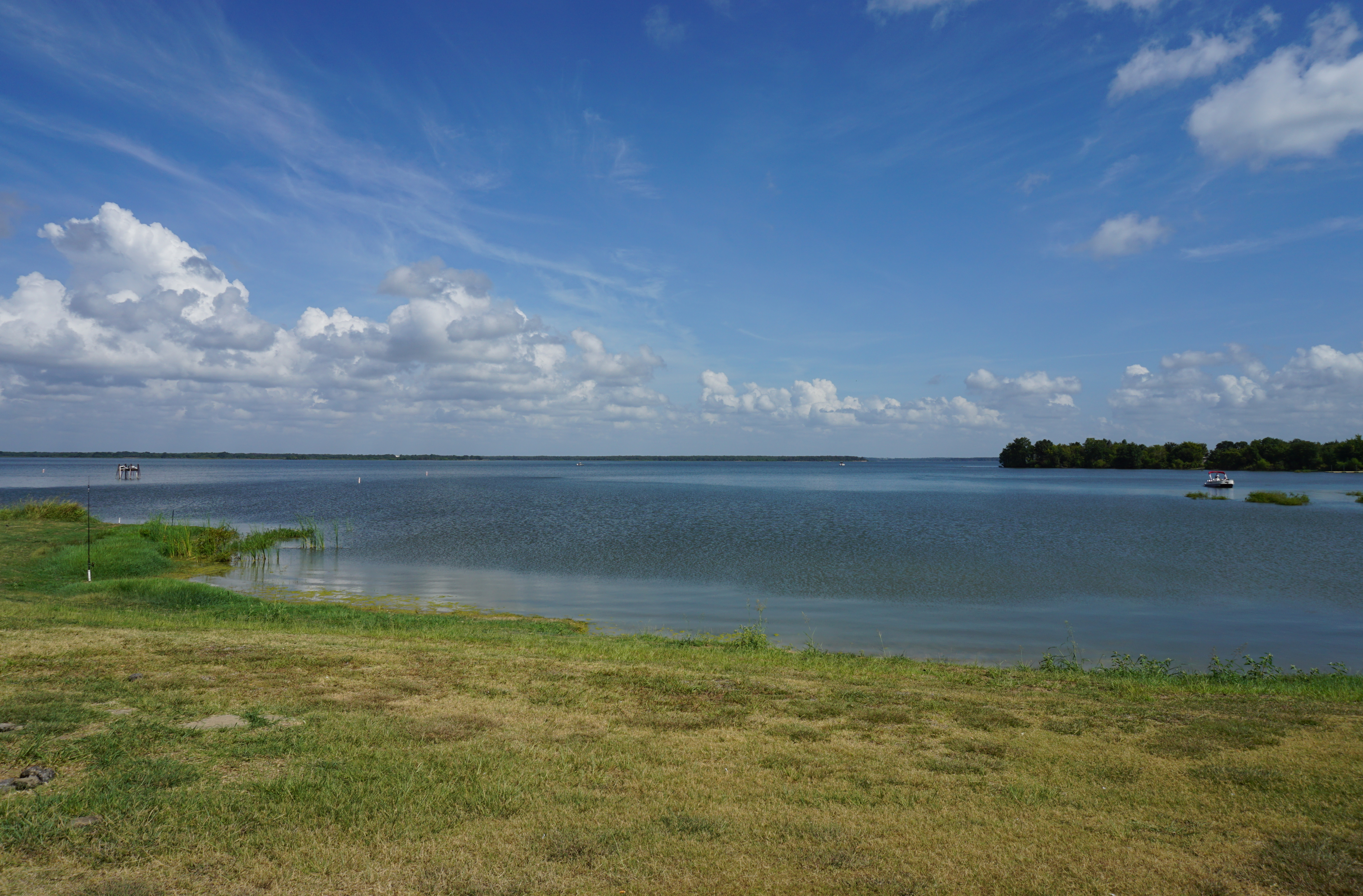
As viewed from West Tawakoni City Park in West Tawakoni, Texas

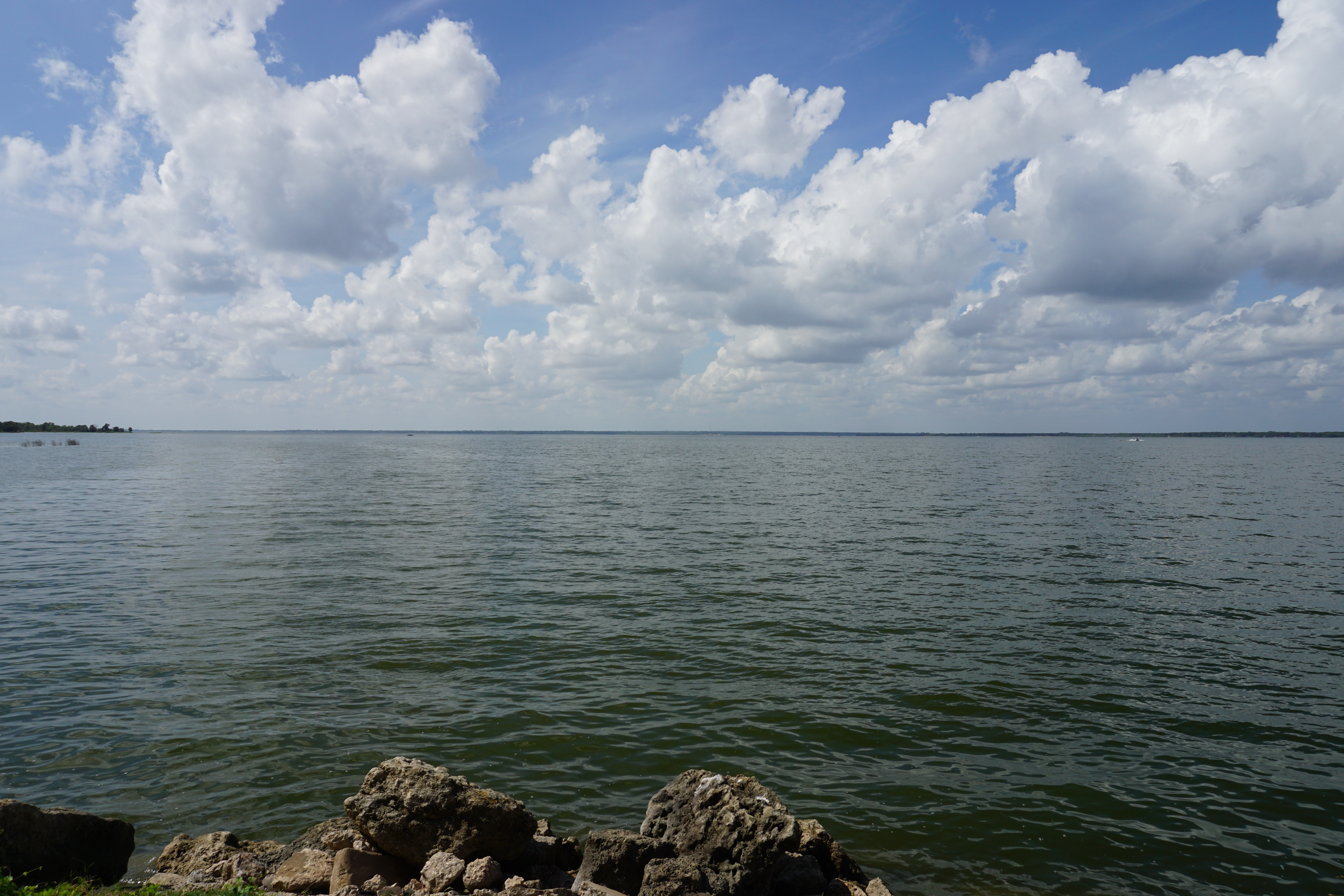
As viewed from East Tawakoni, Texas

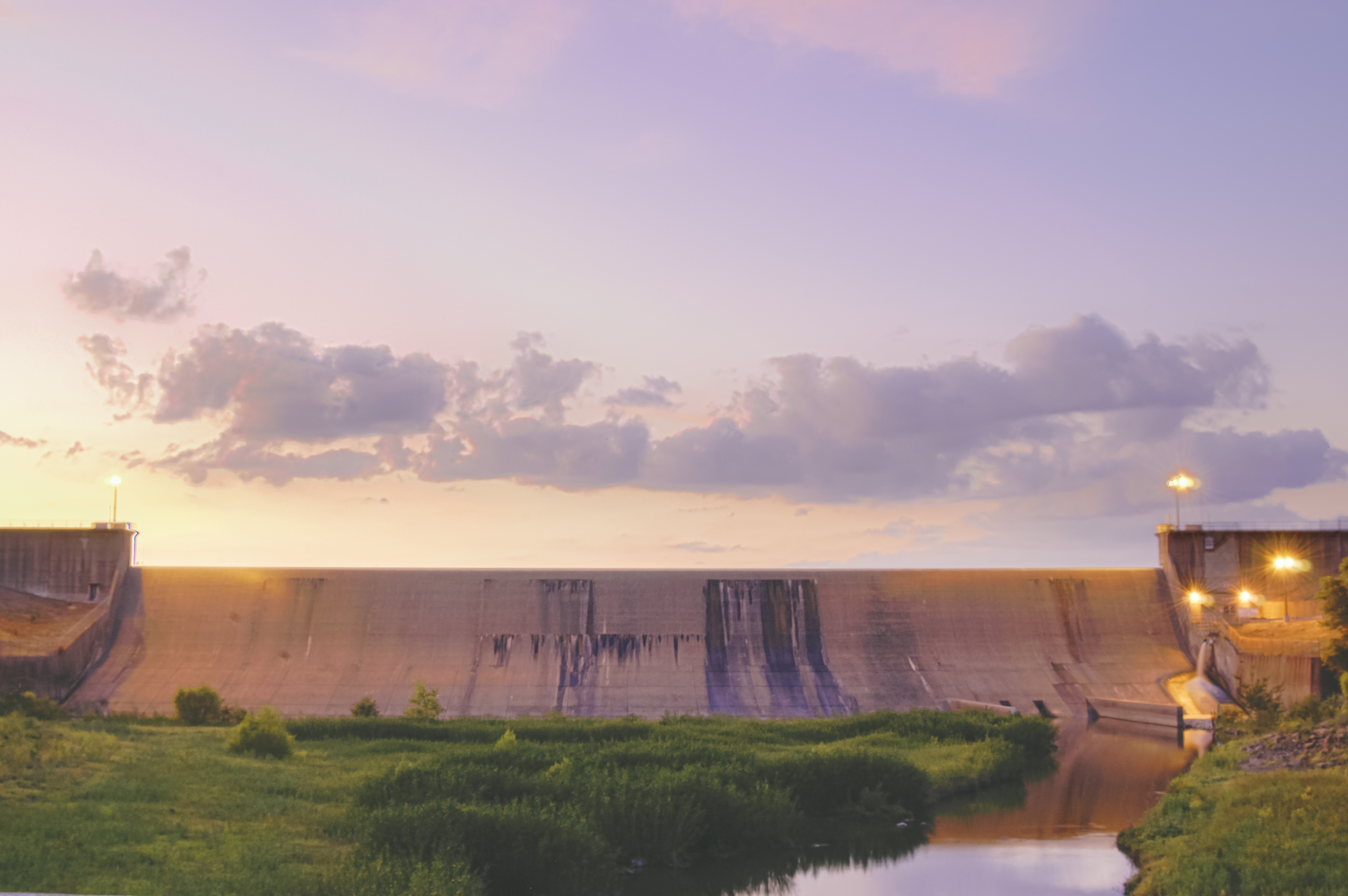
Lake Tawakoni Iron Bridge Dam in East Texas
