= Rains County, Texas =

County in Texas, United States

- County
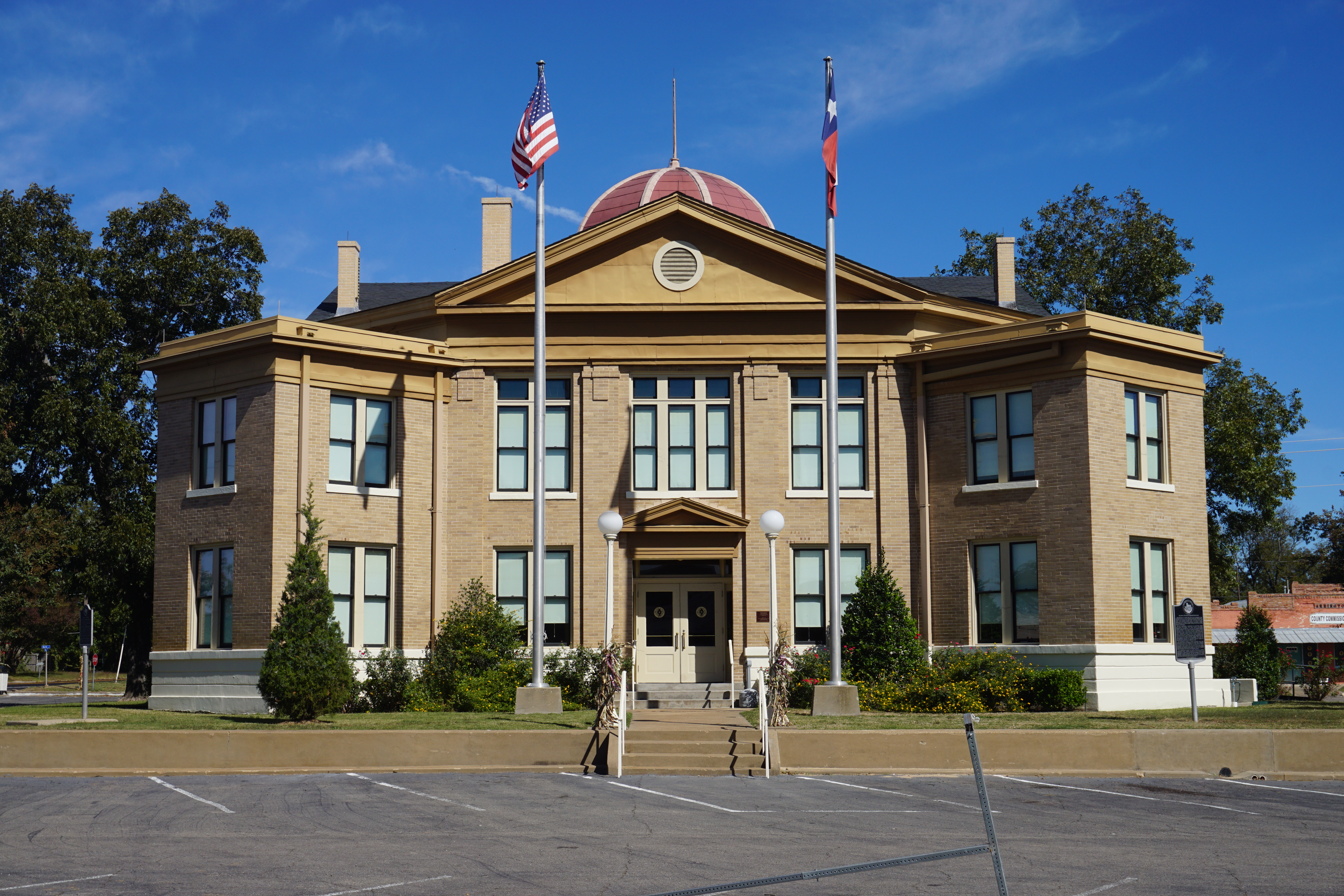
- The Rains County Courthouse in Emory

- Location within the U.S. state of Texas
- Coordinates: 32°52′N 95°48′W
- Country: United States
- State: Texas
- Founded: June 9, 1870
- Named for: Emory Rains
- Seat: Emory
- Largest city: Emory

Area
  - Total: 259 sq mi (670 km^{2})
  - Land: 229 sq mi (590 km^{2})
  - Water: 29 sq mi (75 km^{2}) 11%

Population (2020)
  - Total: 12,164
  - Estimate (2026): 13,761 ▲
  - Density: 53.1/sq mi (20.5/km^{2})
- Time zone: UTC−6 (Central)
  - Summer (DST): UTC−5 (CDT)
- Congressional district: 4th
- Website: www.co.rains.tx.us

Rains County is a county located in the U.S. state of Texas. As of the 2020 census, its population was 12,164. Its seat is Emory. The county and the county seat are both named for Emory Rains, a Texas state legislator notable for creating the state's homestead exemption law, one of the most generous (in terms of protected acreage) among the states.

In 1970, Recorded Texas Historic Landmark Number 10860 was placed in the county courthouse lawn.

== Geography ==
According to the U.S. Census Bureau, the county has a total area of 259 square miles (670 km^{2}), of which 29 square miles (75 km^{2}) (11%) are covered by water; two of Texas' most popular lakes are partially located in the county: Lake Tawakoni on the west and Lake Fork Reservoir on the east. It is the fourth-smallest county in Texas by land area and fifth-smallest by total area.

=== Major highways ===
- U.S. Highway 69
- State Highway 19
- State Highway 276
- Spur 161

=== Minor highways ===
- Farm to Market Road 47
- Farm to Market Road 275
- Farm to Market Road 513
- Farm to Market Road 514
- Farm to Market Road 515
- Farm to Market Road 779
- Farm to Market Road 2081
- Farm to Market Road 2324
- Farm to Market Road 2737
- Farm to Market Road 2795
- Farm to Market Road 2946
- Farm to Market Road 3274
- Farm to Market Road 3299

=== Adjacent counties ===
- Hopkins County (north)
- Wood County (east)
- Van Zandt County (southwest)
- Hunt County (northwest)

== Communities ==
=== Cities ===
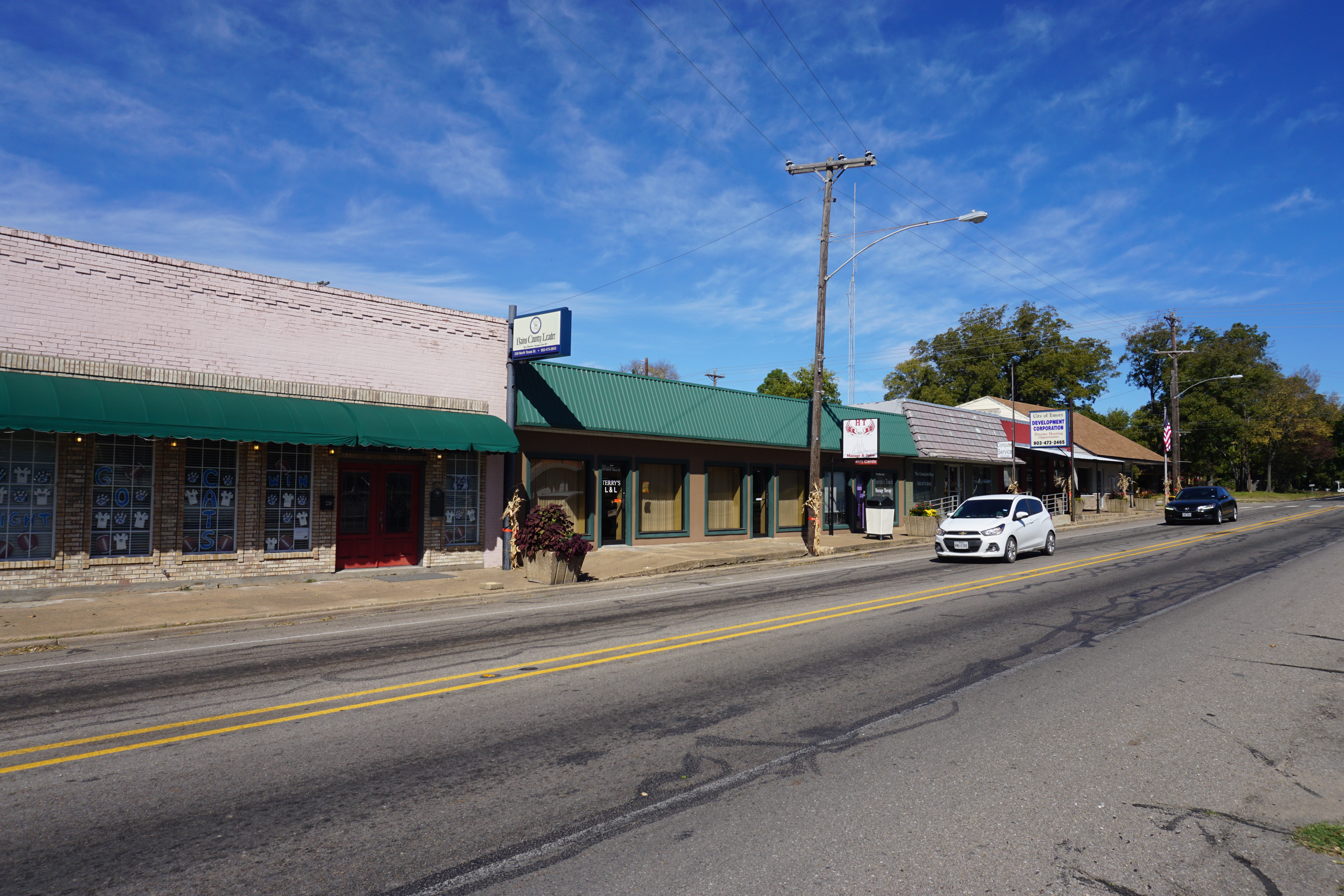
State Highway 19 in Emory

- East Tawakoni
- Emory (county seat)
- Point

=== Towns ===
- Alba (mostly in Wood County)

=== Unincorporated community ===
- Dougherty
- Hogansville

== Demographics ==
Historical population
Census	Pop.	Note	%±
1880	3,035		—
1890	3,909		28.8%
1900	6,127		56.7%
1910	6,787		10.8%
1920	8,099		19.3%
1930	7,114		−12.2%
1940	7,334		3.1%
1950	4,266		−41.8%
1960	2,993		−29.8%
1970	3,752		25.4%
1980	4,839		29.0%
1990	6,715		38.8%
2000	9,139		36.1%
2010	10,914		19.4%
2020	12,164		11.5%
2026 (est.)	13,761	▲	13.1%
U.S. Decennial Census; 1850–2010 2010–2020

=== Racial and ethnic composition ===
Rains County, Texas – Racial and ethnic composition Note: the US Census treats Hispanic/Latino as an ethnic category. This table excludes Latinos from the racial categories and assigns them to a separate category. Hispanics/Latinos may be of any race.
Race / Ethnicity (NH = Non-Hispanic)	Pop 1980	Pop 1990	Pop 2000	Pop 2010	Pop 2020	% 1980	% 1990	% 2000	% 2010	% 2020
White alone (NH)	4,491	6,234	8,183	9,553	10,130	92.81%	92.84%	89.54%	87.53%	83.28%
Black or African American alone (NH)	268	284	263	249	264	5.54%	4.23%	2.88%	2.28%	2.17%
Native American or Alaska Native alone (NH)	19	28	67	95	85	0.39%	0.42%	0.73%	0.87%	0.70%
Asian alone (NH)	1	8	30	55	55	0.02%	0.12%	0.33%	0.50%	0.45%
Native Hawaiian or Pacific Islander alone (NH)	x	x	1	1	1	x	x	0.01%	0.01%	0.01%
Other race alone (NH)	2	3	6	0	33	0.04%	0.04%	0.07%	0.00%	0.27%
Mixed race or Multiracial (NH)	x	x	84	122	487	x	x	0.92%	1.12%	4.00%
Hispanic or Latino (any race)	58	158	505	839	1,109	1.20%	2.35%	5.53%	7.69%	9.12%
Total	4,839	6,715	9,139	10,914	12,164	100.00%	100.00%	100.00%	100.00%	100.00%

=== 2020 census ===
As of the 2020 census, the county had a population of 12,164 and a median age of 47.6 years; 20.7% of residents were under 18 and 24.5% were 65 or older. For every 100 females, there were 100.9 males, and for every 100 females 18 and over, there were 97.1 males 18 and over.

The racial makeup of the county was 85.4% White, 2.2% Black or African American, 0.9% American Indian and Alaska Native, 0.5% Asian, <0.1% Native Hawaiian or Pacific Islander, 4.2% from some other race, and 6.7% from two or more races. Hispanic or Latino residents of any race were 9.1% of the population.

None of the residents lived in urban areas, while 100.0% lived in rural areas.

Of the 4,911 households in the county, 27.7% had children under 18 living in them, 54.7% were married-couple households, 18.0% were households with a male householder and no spouse or partner present, and 21.1% were households with a female householder and no spouse or partner present. About 24.6% of all households were made up of individuals, and 12.4% had someone living alone who was 65 or older.

The county had 5,816 housing units, of which 15.6% were vacant. Among occupied housing units, 80.5% were owner-occupied and 19.5% were renter-occupied. The homeowner vacancy rate was 2.5% and the rental vacancy rate was 10.6%.

=== 2000 census ===
Per the 2000 census, the racial makeup of the county was 93.6% White, 2.6% Black, 1.1% Native American, 1.1% Asian, 0.06% Pacific Islander, and 1.6% from two or more races; 9.2% of the population were Hispanic or Latino of any race.

Of the 4,333 households, 28.8% had children under 18 living with them, 61.9% were married couples living together, 9.1% had a female householder with no husband present, and 25.9% were not families. About 22.3% of all households were made up of individuals, and 11.2% had someone living alone who was 65 or older. The average household size was 2.60, and the average family size was 2.92.

In the county, the age distribution was 23.8% under 18, 7.4% from 18 to 24, 25.1% from 25 to 44, 27.7% from 45 to 64, and 16.1% who were 65 or older. The median age was 41 years. For every 100 females, there were 99.8 males. For every 100 females 18 and over, there were 96.4 males.

The median income in the county for a household was $48,308 and for a family was $40,329. Males had a median income of $31,983 versus $21,594 for females. The per capita income for the county was $23,936. About 11.4% of families and 17.0% of the population were below the poverty line, including 17.5% of those under 18 and 14.1% of those 65 or over.

== Media ==
Rains County is part of the Dallas/Fort Worth DMA. Local media outlets are: KDFW-TV, KXAS-TV, WFAA-TV, KTVT-TV, KERA-TV, KTXA-TV, KDFI-TV, KDAF-TV, and KFWD-TV. Other nearby stations that provide coverage for Rains County come from the Tyler/Longview/Jacksonville market and they include: KLTV, KYTX-TV, KFXK-TV, KCEB-TV, and KETK-TV.

== Education ==
The majority of the county is served by the Rains Independent School District located in Emory.

The far southeastern portion of the county is served by the Alba-Golden Independent School District. The far northwestern corner of the county is served by the Lone Oak Independent School District. A portion of north-central Rains County is served by the Miller Grove Independent School District.

== Politics ==
In the United States House of Representatives, Rains County is within Texas's 4th congressional district and is represented by Republican Pat Fallon.

In the Texas Legislature, Rains County is within Texas House District 5, represented by Republican Cole Hefner, and within Texas Senate District 8, represented by Republican Angela Paxton.

United States presidential election results for Rains County, Texas
Year	Republican		Democratic		Third party(ies)	
Year	No.	%	No.	%	No.	%
1912	67	8.72%	444	57.81%	257	33.46%
1916	71	8.17%	509	58.57%	289	33.26%
1920	189	23.95%	462	58.56%	138	17.49%
1924	151	13.75%	899	81.88%	48	4.37%
1928	202	26.90%	544	72.44%	5	0.67%
1932	41	4.16%	937	95.13%	7	0.71%
1936	63	8.50%	676	91.23%	2	0.27%
1940	251	18.83%	1,080	81.02%	2	0.15%
1944	137	14.96%	628	68.56%	151	16.48%
1948	111	11.76%	739	78.28%	94	9.96%
1952	500	45.96%	588	54.04%	0	0.00%
1956	427	44.85%	524	55.04%	1	0.11%
1960	401	37.10%	680	62.90%	0	0.00%
1964	272	23.29%	893	76.46%	3	0.26%
1968	340	28.24%	558	46.35%	306	25.42%
1972	865	61.61%	532	37.89%	7	0.50%
1976	510	27.49%	1,339	72.18%	6	0.32%
1980	813	40.21%	1,174	58.06%	35	1.73%
1984	1,560	60.21%	1,027	39.64%	4	0.15%
1988	1,281	46.82%	1,448	52.92%	7	0.26%
1992	975	32.69%	1,108	37.14%	900	30.17%
1996	1,123	41.09%	1,265	46.29%	345	12.62%
2000	2,049	61.48%	1,225	36.75%	59	1.77%
2004	2,998	70.89%	1,213	28.68%	18	0.43%
2008	3,146	74.27%	1,048	24.74%	42	0.99%
2012	3,279	80.23%	761	18.62%	47	1.15%
2016	3,968	84.41%	628	13.36%	105	2.23%
2020	5,155	85.16%	842	13.91%	56	0.93%
2024	5,649	86.17%	869	13.26%	38	0.58%

United States Senate election results for Rains County, Texas1
Year	Republican		Democratic		Third party(ies)	
Year	No.	%	No.	%	No.	%
2024	5,450	83.49%	951	14.57%	127	1.95%

United States Senate election results for Rains County, Texas2
Year	Republican		Democratic		Third party(ies)	
Year	No.	%	No.	%	No.	%
2020	5,060	84.96%	789	13.25%	107	1.80%

Texas Gubernatorial election results for Rains County
Year	Republican		Democratic		Third party(ies)	
Year	No.	%	No.	%	No.	%
2022	4,339	87.01%	596	11.95%	52	1.04%

== See also ==
- National Register of Historic Places listings in Rains County, Texas
- Recorded Texas Historic Landmarks in Rains County
