= Emory, Texas =

- City
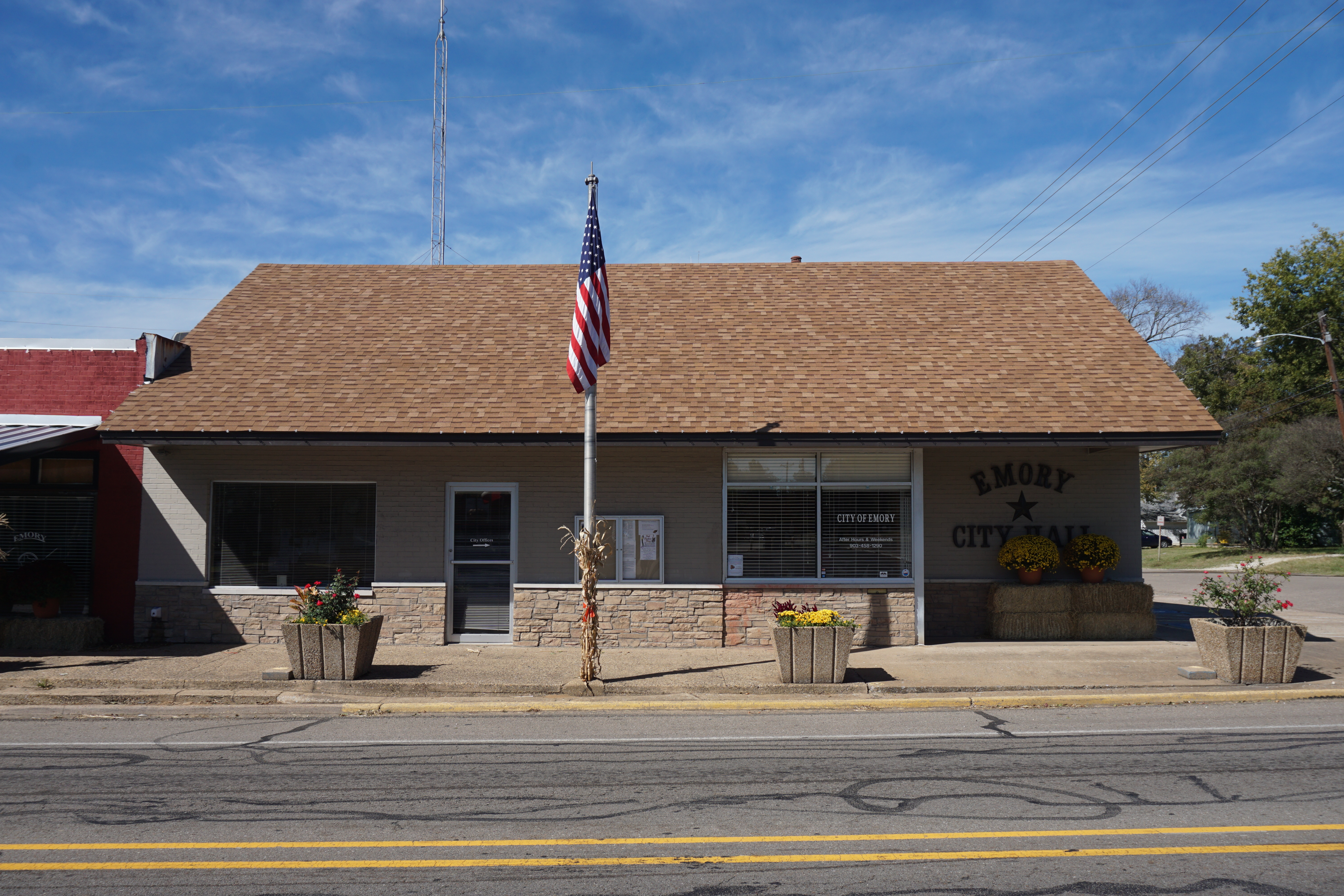
- Emory City Hall

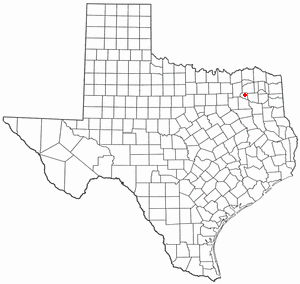
- Location of Emory, Texas

- Coordinates: 32°52′10″N 95°45′30″W
- Country: United States
- State: Texas
- County: Rains

Area
  - Total: 1.98 sq mi (5.12 km^{2})
  - Land: 1.96 sq mi (5.08 km^{2})
  - Water: 0.015 sq mi (0.04 km^{2})
- Elevation: 459 ft (140 m)

Population (2020)
  - Total: 1,251
  - Density: 710/sq mi (274.2/km^{2})
- Time zone: UTC-6 (Central (CST))
  - Summer (DST): UTC-5 (CDT)
- ZIP code: 75440
- Area code: 903, 430
- FIPS code: 48-24216
- GNIS feature ID: 2410438
- Website: https://www.cityofemory.com/

Emory is a city in Rains County, Texas, United States. As of the 2020 census, Emory had a population of 1,251. It is the county seat of Rains County. Previously known as Springville, the city and county are named after Emory Rains, who was a legislator from the area. Rains was the author of the Homestead Law of Texas, which was later used as a model for the protection of homesteads throughout the United States. Special legislation passed to create Rains County called for the citizens to vote on the location of the county seat and for that selected town to be named Emory.

== Geography ==
According to the United States Census Bureau, the city has a total area of 1.98 sq mi (5.1 km^{2}), of which 0.02 sq mi is covered by water.

Emory is located between two of Texas' most popular lakes: Lake Tawakoni to its west and Lake Fork Reservoir to its east.

The climate in this area is characterized by hot, humid summers and generally mild to cool winters. According to the Köppen climate classification, Emory has a humid subtropical climate, Cfa on climate maps.

=== Climate ===
Climate data for Emory, Texas (1991–2020)
Month	Jan	Feb	Mar	Apr	May	Jun	Jul	Aug	Sep	Oct	Nov	Dec	Year
Mean daily maximum °F (°C)	55.4 (13.0)	58.8 (14.9)	66.7 (19.3)	73.6 (23.1)	81.0 (27.2)	88.1 (31.2)	91.7 (33.2)	92.0 (33.3)	87.1 (30.6)	76.8 (24.9)	65.5 (18.6)	57.1 (13.9)	74.5 (23.6)
Daily mean °F (°C)	44.2 (6.8)	47.3 (8.5)	55.3 (12.9)	62.4 (16.9)	70.7 (21.5)	78.2 (25.7)	81.6 (27.6)	81.1 (27.3)	75.3 (24.1)	64.6 (18.1)	54.3 (12.4)	45.8 (7.7)	63.4 (17.5)
Mean daily minimum °F (°C)	33.0 (0.6)	35.7 (2.1)	43.9 (6.6)	51.2 (10.7)	60.4 (15.8)	68.4 (20.2)	71.5 (21.9)	70.2 (21.2)	63.6 (17.6)	52.5 (11.4)	43.1 (6.2)	34.6 (1.4)	52.3 (11.3)
Average precipitation inches (mm)	3.10 (79)	3.46 (88)	4.56 (116)	4.11 (104)	4.64 (118)	4.05 (103)	3.05 (77)	2.77 (70)	3.28 (83)	4.84 (123)	3.37 (86)	4.21 (107)	45.44 (1,154)
Average snowfall inches (cm)	0.4 (1.0)	0.9 (2.3)	0.0 (0.0)	0.0 (0.0)	0.0 (0.0)	0.0 (0.0)	0.0 (0.0)	0.0 (0.0)	0.0 (0.0)	0.0 (0.0)	0.0 (0.0)	0.0 (0.0)	1.3 (3.3)
Source: NOAA

== Demographics ==
Historical population
Census	Pop.	Note	%±
1890	353		—
1900	426		20.7%
1920	800		—
1930	750		−6.2%
1940	700		−6.7%
1950	648		−7.4%
1960	570		−12.0%
1970	693		21.6%
1980	813		17.3%
1990	963		18.5%
2000	1,021		6.0%
2010	1,239		21.4%
2020	1,251		1.0%
2024 (est.)	1,404		12.2%
U.S. Decennial Census

=== 2020 census ===
As of the 2020 census, Emory had 1,251, 472 households and 305 families residing in the city. The median age was 35.8 years; 25.7% of residents were under 18 and 20.4% were 65 or older. For every 100 females, there were 94.9 males, and for every 100 females 18 and over, there were 87.1 males 18 and over.

None of residents lived in urban areas, while 100.0% lived in rural areas.

Of the 472 households in Emory, 36.2% had children under 18 living with them, 39.6% were married-couple households, 18.6% were households with a male householder and no spouse or partner present, and 35.4% were households with a female householder and no spouse or partner present. About 31.3% of all households were made up of individuals, and 15.9% had someone living alone who was 65 or older.

Of the 559 housing units, 15.6% were vacant. The homeowner vacancy rate was 6.9% and the rental vacancy rate was 16.0%.

Racial composition as of the 2020 census
Race	Number	Percentage
White	983	78.6%
Black or African American	61	4.9%
American Indian and Alaska Native	16	1.3%
Asian	8	0.6%
Native Hawaiian and other Pacific Islander	1	0.1%
Some other race	64	5.1%
Two or more races	118	9.4%
Hispanic or Latino (of any race)	143	11.4%

=== 2019 estimates ===
As of 2019 estimates for the city, the median income was $55,912 for a household and for a family was $67,834. Males had a median income of $34,076 versus $24,722 for females. The per capita income was $15,107. About 16.15% of the population were below the poverty line, including 10.2% of those under 18 and 21.7% of those 65 or over.

== Education ==
The City of Emory is served by the Rains Independent School District. On May 30, 2019, the Rains LadyCats softball team won their first state title by defeating the Hallettsville High School Lady Brahmas by a score of 6-2 at McCombs Field on the campus of UT Austin.
