= List of Farm to Market Roads in Texas (500–599) =

- Texas Farm to Market Road and Ranch to Market Road markers

Highway names
- Interstates: Interstate Highway X (IH-X, I-X)
- US Highways: U.S. Highway X (US X)
- State: State Highway X (SH X)
- Loops: Loop X
- Spurs: Spur X
- Recreational: Recreational Road X (RE X)
- Farm or Ranch to Market Roads: Farm to Market Road X (FM X); Ranch to Market Road X (RM X)
- Park Roads: Park Road X (PR X)

System links
- Highways in Texas; Interstate; US; State; Former; Toll; Loops; Spurs; FM/RM; Park; Rec

Farm to Market Roads in Texas are owned and maintained by the Texas Department of Transportation (TxDOT).

== FM 500 ==
Farm to Market Road 500
- Location: San Saba County
- Length: 22.279 mi (35.855 km)
- Existed: July 13, 1945–present

Farm to Market Road 500 (FM 500) is located in San Saba County. It runs from SH 16 north of San Saba to FM 45 north of Richland Springs.

FM 500 was designated on July 13, 1945, from SH 16 northwestward 6.5 miles (10.5 km) to Fairview. It was extended northwest twice: a 4.4-mile (7.1 km) extension on November 23, 1948, and a 4-mile (6.4 km) extension on September 29, 1954. On September 28, 1955 (connecting section designated August 24), it was extended to the west to FM 45, replacing FM 1479.

== RM 501 ==
Ranch to Market Road 501
- Location: Mason and San Saba counties
- Length: 35.604 mi (57.299 km)
- Existed: July 13, 1945 (Note: RM 501 was previously designated as FM 501 from 1945 to 1957.)–present

Ranch to Market Road 501 (RM 501) is located in Mason and San Saba counties. Its western terminus is at SH 71 in Pontotoc. It travels to the north before turning to the east toward Cherokee, where it crosses SH 16. It then travels eastward and then northeastward before reaching its eastern terminus at FM 580 southwest of Bend, for a total length of 35.6 miles (57.3 km).

RM 501 was authorized on July 13, 1945, as Farm to Market Road 501 (FM 501), a 3.4-mile (5.5 km) road between SH 16 in Cherokee and the Salt Branch Road in San Saba County. On November 29, 1957, FM 501 was extended west to Pontotoc, replacing FM 1648; at this time, the designation was changed from FM 501 to RM 501. On October 31, 1958, RM 501 was extended eastward 6 miles (9.7 km). On September 27, 1960, it was extended to its junction with FM 580.

== FM 502 ==
Farm to Market Road 502
- Location: McCulloch and San Saba counties
- Length: 16.013 mi (25.770 km)
- Existed: July 14, 1945–present

Farm to Market Road 502 (FM 502) is located in McCulloch and San Saba counties.

FM 502 was designated on July 14, 1945, from US 377 southeast and east 4 miles (6.4 km) via Mercury to the Milburn Road. On August 24, 1954, FM 502 was extended east to the McCulloch–San Saba county line. On September 23, 1954, the route was extended southeast to FM 45, replacing FM 2048.

== FM 503 ==
Farm to Market Road 503
- Location: McCulloch and Coleman counties
- Length: 48.023 mi (77.286 km)
- Existed: July 14, 1945–present

Farm to Market Road 503 (FM 503) is located in McCulloch and Coleman counties. It runs from US 87 northwest of Melvin to a point north of SH 153 northwest of Coleman.

FM 503 was designated on July 14, 1945, from a point on US 87 2.5 miles (4.0 km) northwest of Melvin, northward 7.4 miles (11.9 km) miles to Salt Gap. On November 23, 1948, the FM 503 designation was extended 6.2 miles (10.0 km) miles to the north, to Doole. On November 21, 1956, the route was extended northward 6 miles (9.7 km) to Stacy. On September 27, 1960, the road was extended north to US 67, replacing FM 566. On May 6, 1964, FM 503 was extended north to FM 53 (now SH 153). On May 7, 1974, FM 503 was extended north 2.4 miles (3.9 km) to its current terminus.

== FM 504 ==
Farm to Market Road 504
- Location: McCulloch County
- Length: 14.458 mi (23.268 km)
- Existed: July 14, 1945–present

Farm to Market Road 504 (FM 504) is located in McCulloch County.

FM 504 was designated on July 14, 1945, from US 283 west and south 3.5 miles (5.6 km) through Lohn to a point 5 miles (8.0 km) east of Pear Valley. On July 21, 1949, FM 504 was extended west 2.8 miles (4.5 km). On May 23, 1951, FM 504 was extended west 3.2 miles (5.1 km) through Pear Valley to a road intersection. On November 20, 1951, FM 504 was extended west 3.1 miles (5.0 km). On December 17, 1952, FM 504 was extended west 2 miles (3.2 km) miles to FM 503.

== RM 505 ==
Ranch to Market Road 505
- Location: Jeff Davis County
- Length: 8.827 mi (14.206 km)
- Existed: July 9, 1945 (Note: RM 505 was previously designated as FM 505 from 1945 to 1959.)–present

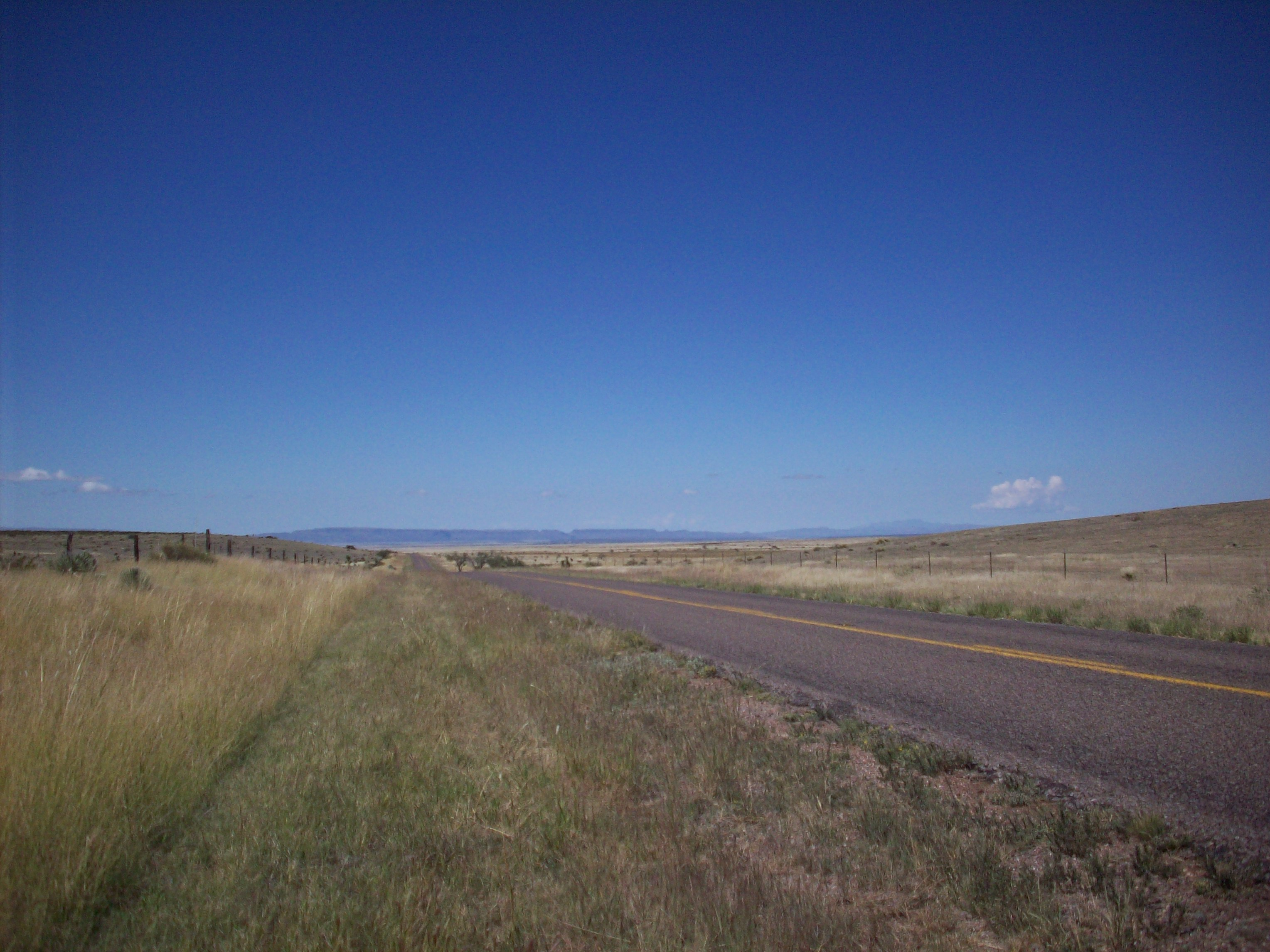
West on RM 505, with Valentine in the distance, September 2009

Ranch to Market Road 505 (RM 505) lies entirely within Jeff Davis County in the Trans-Pecos region of far West Texas. Intended to provide a link between the county's only two incorporated areas, Valentine and Fort Davis, RM 505 begins at a junction with US 90 south of Valentine and travels about 8.8 miles (14.2 km) east to an intersection with SH 166 approximately 22 miles (35 km) west of Fort Davis.

RM 505 was designated on July 19, 1945 on the current route, as Farm to Market Road 505 (FM 505). The designation was changed to RM 505 on October 27, 1959.

== FM 506 ==
Farm to Market Road 506
- Location: Willacy and Cameron counties
- Length: 19.763 mi (31.805 km)
- Existed: July 3, 1945–present

Farm to Market Road 506 (FM 506) is located in Willacy and Cameron counties. It runs from US 281 in Bluetown to Bus. US 77 in Sebastian, and also serves the towns of La Feria, where the highway intersects I-2/US 83, and Santa Rosa, where it runs concurrent with SH 107.

FM 506 was designated on July 3, 1945, from Santa Rosa to a point 3.2 miles (5.1 km) north. On November 23, 1948, the road was extended to US 77 (later Loop 448, now Bus. US 77) in Sebastian. On October 26, 1954, a 12.1-mile (19.5 km) section from SH 107 in Santa Rosa to US 281 was added, creating a concurrency with SH 107.

Junction list

County	Location	mi	km	Destinations	Notes
Cameron	Bluetown	0.0	0.0	US 281	Southern terminus
Cameron		2.9	4.7	FM 3067 east	
Cameron	La Feria	5.9	9.5	Bus. US 83	
Cameron	La Feria	6.3	10.1	I-2 / US 83	I-2 exit 169
Cameron	Santa Rosa	12.0	19.3	SH 107 east – Combes	South end of SH 107 overlap
Cameron	Santa Rosa	12.6	20.3	SH 107 west – Edcouch, Edinburg	North end of SH 107 overlap
Willacy		18.6	29.9	FM 2629 west	
Willacy	Sebastian	20.4	32.8	Bus. US 77 / Spur 413 east	Northern terminus; roadway continues as Spur 413
1.000 mi = 1.609 km; 1.000 km = 0.621 mi: Concurrency terminus

== FM 507 ==
Farm to Market Road 507
- Location: Cameron and Willacy counties
- Length: 14.451 mi (23.257 km)
- Existed: July 3, 1945–present

Farm to Market Road 507 (FM 507) is located in Cameron and Willacy counties. It runs from Bus. US 77 to FM 498.

FM 507 was designated on July 3, 1945, from FM 106 northeast of Harlingen north 2.7 miles (4.3 km) to the Combes/Rio Hondo Road (later FM 508). On July 12, 1949, the road was extended 3.2 miles (5.1 km) north and east to a road intersection (later FM 498). On December 29, 1949, the road was extended 2.5 miles (4.0 km) east, but this section was reassigned to FM 1599 on June 18, 1950. On February 6, 1953, a break was added at FM 508. On October 31, 1957, the road was extended north 5.0 miles (8.0 km) to FM 1018. On August 28, 1958, the northern terminus was moved to FM 498, forming a continuous route with FM 2374; FM 508 was extended over FM 2374 on September 12, 1958, replacing it. On July 1, 1959, the road was extended south 1.3 miles (2.1 km) over former FM 106 to US 77 (later Loop 448, now Bus. US 77). On June 27, 1995, the section from FM 508 to Bus. US 77 was transferred to Urban Road 507 (UR 507) The designation reverted to FM 507 with the elimination of the Urban Road system on November 15, 2018.

== FM 508 ==
Farm to Market Road 508
- Location: Cameron County
- Length: 9.054 mi (14.571 km)
- Existed: July 3, 1945–present

Farm to Market Road 508 (FM 508) is located in Cameron County. It runs from I-69E/US 77 at Combes to FM 106 west of Rio Hondo.

FM 508 was designated on July 3, 1945, from a point 6.5 miles (10.5 km) east of Combes to FM 106 west of Rio Hondo. On December 17, 1952, the road was extended 6.2 miles (10.0 km) west to US 77, creating a concurrency with FM 507. This concurrency was removed on February 6, 1953, when this section was transferred to FM 508. On May 21, 1979, a 0.3-mile (0.48 km) section from Loop 448 (now Bus. US 77) to US 77 was transferred to SH 107.

== FM 509 ==
Farm to Market Road 509
- Location: Cameron County
- Length: 17.053 mi (27.444 km)
- Existed: July 3, 1945–present

Farm to Market Road 509 (FM 509) is located in Cameron County. It runs from FM 508 to the Los Indios Texas Port of Entry near the Free Trade International Bridge along the Mexican border.

FM 509 was designated on July 3, 1945, from US 83 south of Harlingen to Rangerville and southeast to Sam Houston Boulevard, but the route was corrected to end at FM 675. On April 26, 1989, the road was extended south 3.0 miles (4.8 km) to the GSA complex at the Los Indios International Bridge, although this section was not officially designated until April 5, 1992, replacing FM 3380. On December 21, 1994, the road was extended north to FM 508, replacing Loop 590 and creating a concurrency with FM 1595. On June 27, 1995, the section from FM 1595 to US 77 was transferred to Urban Road 509 (UR 509). On November 20, 2014, the road was extended east 0.4 miles (0.64 km) to a then-proposed Border State Inspection Facility. The designation of the section previously transferred to UR 509 reverted to FM 509 with the elimination of the Urban Road system on November 15, 2018.

== FM 510 ==
Farm to Market Road 510
- Location: Cameron County
- Length: 22.284 mi (35.863 km)
- Existed: July 3, 1945–present

Farm to Market Road 510 (FM 510) is located in Cameron County. It runs from Bus. US 77 and FM 732 in San Benito to SH 100 near Laguna Vista.

FM 510 was designated on July 3, 1945, from SH 100 near Laguna Vista to Abney. On October 26, 1954, the road was extended 17.2 miles (27.7 km) to US 83 (now East Stenger Street) southeast of San Benito, replacing a section of FM 732. On December 16, 2004, the 0.3-mile (0.48 km) section from Bus. US 77 to Iowa Gardens Road was transferred to FM 732.

== FM 511 ==
Farm to Market Road 511
- Location: Cameron County
- Length: 9.223 mi (14.843 km)
- Existed: July 3, 1945–present

Farm to Market Road 511 (FM 511) is located in Cameron County. It runs from FM 3248 on the northeast side of Brownsville southeast and southward to the city's southern sections. The highway forms an outer loop/bypass of the main portion of Brownsville. It is known locally and is signed as the Senator Eddie Lucio Jr. Highway.

FM 511 was originally designated on July 3, 1945, from US 83 in Olmito to SH 4 near the Port of Brownsville. On September 9, 1947, it was extended on the north side to include a 5-mile (8.0 km) section to US 281 near Olmito, and on the south side to extend southward and westward 4 miles (6.4 km) into Brownsville. On November 23, 1948, it was extended to SH 4 in Brownsville. On October 7, 1949, the section south of FM 1419 was transferred to FM 1419. On January 29, 1957, this section west of Olmito was renumbered FM 1732. On August 26, 1969, FM 511 was relocated at Port of Brownsville.

The highway formerly extended northwest to I-69E and US 77/US 83 at Olmito, but this portion was expanded starting in 2008 and was transferred to SH 550. The section from FM 3248 south to SH 48 was a part of this expansion, becoming a four-lane highway with center turning lane. This project began in January 2008 and was completed late in 2010.

On June 27, 1995, the section from FM 3248 to FM 1419 was designated Urban Road 511 (UR 511). The designation reverted to FM 511 with the elimination of the Urban Road system on November 15, 2018.

== FM 512 ==
Farm to Market Road 512
- Location: Hunt County
- Length: 13.040 mi (20.986 km)
- Existed: June 25, 1945–present

Farm to Market Road 512 (FM 512) is located in Hunt County. It runs from FM 2874 west of Commerce to SH 34 in Wolfe City.

FM 512 was designated on June 25, 1945, from SH 24 (now FM 2874), 2.7 miles (4.3 km) west of Commerce, to Aberfoyle. On November 30, 1949, the road was extended northwest 6.3 miles (10.1 km) to SH 34 in Wolfe City.

== FM 513 ==
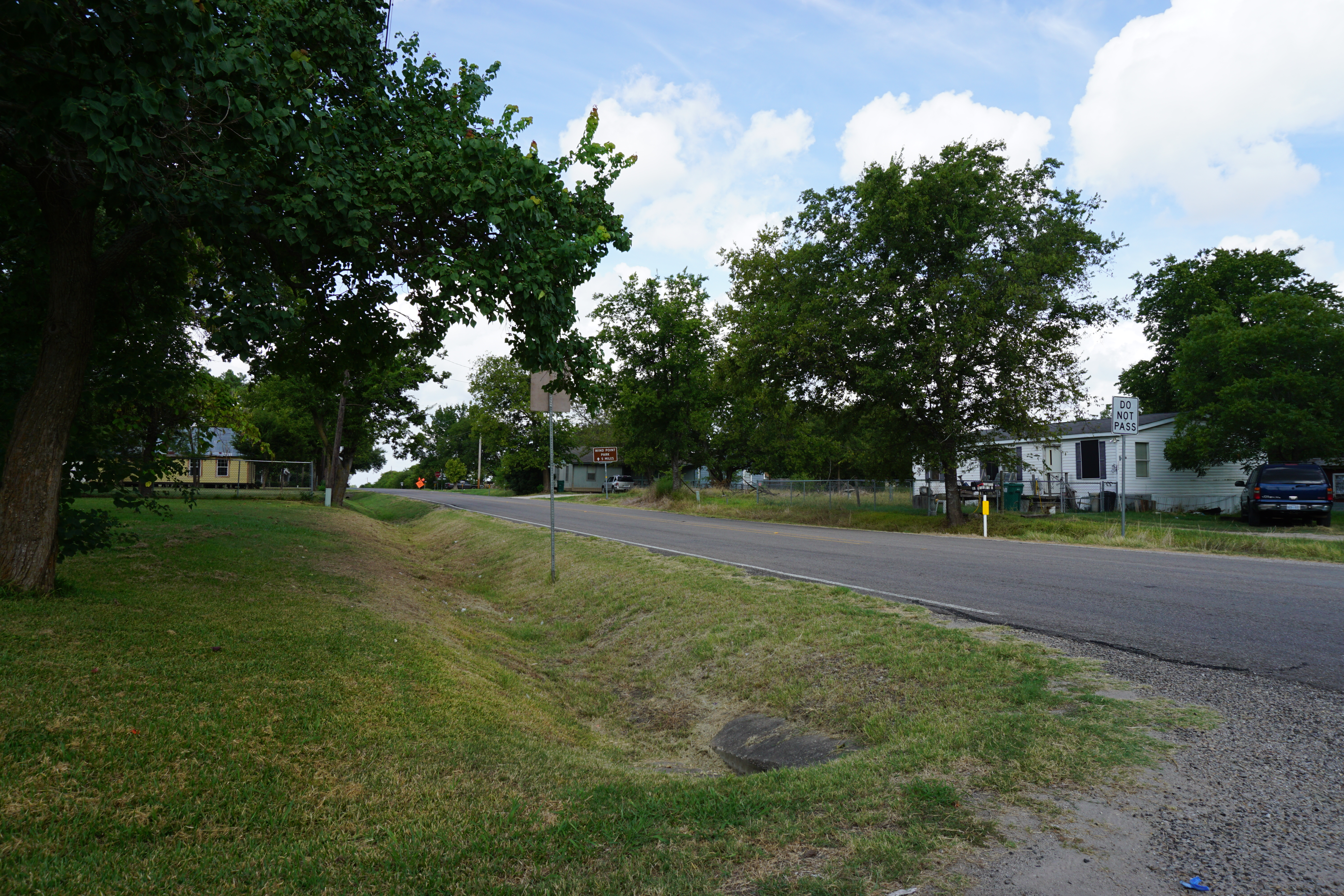
FM 513 in Lone Oak

Farm to Market Road 513
- Location: Hunt and Rains counties
- Length: 18.056 mi (29.058 km)
- Existed: June 25, 1945–present

Farm to Market Road 513 (FM 513) is located in Hunt and Rains counties. It runs from SH 50 to SH 276.

FM 513 was designated on June 25, 1945, from SH 24 (now SH 224) in Commerce via Campbell to US 69 in Lone Oak. On November 23, 1948, FM 513 was extended south 5.8 miles (9.3 km) to a road intersection. On December 15, 1954, FM 513 was extended south to FM 35 (now SH 276), replacing FM 1974. On August 28, 1958, the section from old SH 24 to old SH 11 Alt. was transferred to Spur 178. On May 1, 1965, the section from FM 819 to Spur 178 was transferred to the new SH 50, as well as FM 819 itself.

== FM 514 ==
Farm to Market Road 514
- Location: Rains and Wood counties
- Length: 17.504 mi (28.170 km)
- Existed: June 11, 1945–present

Farm to Market Road 514 (FM 514) is located in Rains and Wood counties. It runs from US 69 in Point to FM 17. The route has overlaps with FM 275 in Dougherty and SH 19 in Freedom. A spur connection, FM Spur 514, connects to Lake Fork Reservoir.

FM 514 was designated on June 11, 1945, from Point to a point 7 miles (11 km) south. On July 14, 1949, the road was extended northeast 5 miles (8.0 km) to Wattsville. It was extended northeast 3.3 miles (5.3 km) to FM 275 and south to Flats on May 23, 1951. On November 27, 1953, a 6.8-mile (10.9 km) section (the extension to Flats) was transferred to FM 47. On December 21, 1959, the road was extended to FM 17, replacing a section of FM 275 and all of FM 1767, creating concurrencies with FM 275 and SH 19. A portion of what was previously FM 1767 was once FM 2089. The spur connection was added on October 6, 1980; this was formerly a portion of FM 17 before it was rerouted due to construction of the reservoir.

== FM 515 ==
Farm to Market Road 515
- Location: Rains and Wood counties
- Length: 30.022 mi (48.316 km)
- Existed: June 11, 1945–present

Farm to Market Road 515 (FM 515) is located in Rains and Wood counties. It runs from FM 2795 to SH 11 east of Winnsboro. The route has an overlap with FM 69 in Coke.

FM 515 was designated on June 11, 1945, from US 69 (now FM 2795), 5 miles (8.0 km) southeast of Emory, to a point 3.7 miles (6.0 km) northeast. On October 29, 1953, the road was extended east 8.5 miles (13.7 km) to FM 1483. On December 21, 1959, the road was extended 17.3 miles (27.8 km) to SH 11 east of Winnsboro, replacing sections of FM 1483 and FM 69 and creating a concurrency with FM 69. On July 11, 1968, the road was routed on a new route to FM 2795; the old route was transferred to FM 2946.

== FM 516 ==
Farm to Market Road 516
- Location: Ward County
- Length: 11.095 mi (17.856 km)
- Existed: June 11, 1945 (Note: FM 516 was previously designated as RM 516 from 1945 to 1946.)–present

Farm to Market Road 516 (FM 516) is located in Ward County. It runs from CR 160 northwest of Barstow to CR 460 southeast of Barstow. It crosses I-20 at the freeway's exit 49.

FM 516 was designated on June 11, 1945, as Ranch to Market Road 516 (RM 516), running from Barstow to a point 8.7 miles (14.0 km) northwest. The route was redesignated FM 516 on May 25, 1946. On January 22, 1949, it was extended 2.4 miles (3.9 km) southeast of Barstow, replacing a section of FM 873.

== FM 517 ==
Farm to Market Road 517
- Location: Brazoria and Galveston counties
- Length: 21.079 mi (33.923 km)
- Existed: July 9, 1945–present

Farm to Market Road 517 (FM 517) is located in Brazoria and Galveston counties. It runs from SH 6 in Alvin to SH 146.

FM 517 was designated on July 9, 1945, from US 75 at Dickinson east to SH 146 at San Leon, and US 75 at Dickinson west to the Brazoria County line. the Dickinson–Brazoria county line portion was cancelled on January 18, 1946 (to free up funds for construction of remaining FM roads in the county), and the road was extended west and south to Alta Loma on July 20, 1948. On December 17, 1952, the road was extended west to SH 6, and a 4.8-mile section of FM 517 was transferred to FM 646 (this portion was originally planned as FM 520). On October 28, 1953, the road was extended northeast to Edwards Point. On September 21, 1955, the road was extended west from Edwards Point to SH 146, and then west and south via Bacliff to FM 517 on May 2, 1962, creating a loop route. The Edwards Point-FM 517 portion was renumbered FM 3436 (partially now FM 646) on January 28, 1982. On June 27, 1995, the section between FM 646 and San Leon was transferred to Urban Road 517 (UR 517). The designation of this segment reverted to FM 517 with the elimination of the Urban Road system on November 15, 2018.

== FM 518 ==
Farm to Market Road 518
- Location: Brazoria and Galveston counties
- Length: 25.568 mi (41.148 km)
- Existed: June 21, 1945–present

Farm to Market Road 518 (FM 518) is located in Brazoria and Galveston counties. It runs from SH 288 to SH 146/future SH 99.

FM 518 was designated on June 21, 1945, from US 59 (now US 90 Alt.) on the south side of Houston south to the Brazoria County line. On July 9, 1945, the road was extended south and east to Kemah via Pearland and League City, but the US 75-Brazoria County line portion was cancelled on January 18, 1946 (to free up funds for construction of remaining FM roads in the county), creating a gap. This gap was closed on January 27, 1949, when the section from League City to the Brazoria County line was restored. On January 16, 1968, the eastern terminus was relocated and FM 518 was rerouted, replacing a portion of FM 1266. The old route was renumbered FM 2094. On September 13, 1984, the US 90 Alt.-FM 518 portion was transferred to FM 865 and FM 518 was rerouted over FM 3344, which was cancelled. On June 30, 1995, the entire route was transferred to Urban Road 518 (UR 518). The designation reverted to FM 518 with the elimination of the Urban Road system on November 15, 2018.

== FM 519 ==
Farm to Market Road 519
- Location: Galveston County
- Length: 6.421 mi (10.334 km)
- Existed: July 9, 1945–present

Farm to Market Road 519 (FM 519) is located in Galveston County. It runs from SH 6 in Hitchcock to Spur 197 in Texas City.

FM 519 was designated on July 9, 1945, from Hitchcock to US 75 near La Marque. On November 29, 1990, the road was extended east to Loop 197 (now Spur 197), replacing SH 341. On June 17, 1995, the entire route was transferred to Urban Road 519 (UR 519). The designation reverted to FM 519 with the elimination of the Urban Road system on November 15, 2018.

== FM 520 ==
Farm to Market Road 520
- Location: Hansford and Sherman counties
- Length: 22.531 mi (36.260 km)
- Existed: May 23, 1951–present

Farm to Market Road 520 (FM 520) is located in Hansford and Sherman counties. It runs from SH 207 near Spearman to FM 1060.

FM 520 was designated on May 23, 1951, from SH 117 (later SH 15, now SH 207) west to McKibben. On September 21, 1955, FM 520 was extended west to FM 278 (now SH 136). On May 25, 1976, FM 520 was extended west to FM 1060.

=== FM 520 (1945) ===
Farm to Market Road 520
- Location: Galveston County
- Existed: July 9, 1945–January 18, 1946

A previous route numbered FM 520 was designated on July 9, 1945, from SH 6 at Alta Loma north to FM 517 between Dickinson and Alvin. The route was cancelled (along with sections of FM 517 and FM 518) on January 18, 1946, to free up funds for construction of remaining FM roads in the county. FM 517 was routed over FM 520 in 1948, and is now a portion of FM 646.

== FM 521 ==
Farm to Market Road 521
- Location: Matagorda, Brazoria, Fort Bend, and Harris counties
- Length: 94.609 mi (152.258 km)
- Existed: July 9, 1945–present

Farm to Market Road 521 (FM 521) is located in Southeast Texas. It runs from US 90 Alt. in Houston as Almeda Road to SH 35 near Palacios. At nearly 95 miles (153 km), FM 521 is one of the longest farm-to-market roads in Texas.

FM 521 was designated on July 9, 1945, from SH 36 in Brazoria to SH 35 at Bailey's Prairie. On January 16, 1953, the road was extended southwest and west to SH 60 in Wadsworth, replacing a portion of FM 524 and all of FM 1090 and FM 1469. On October 15, 1954, the road was extended to SH 35 near Palacios, replacing FM 460 and FM 1096 (the connecting section was designated on September 29). A month later the road was extended northeast to SH 288 (now BS 288-B). On September 21, 1955, the road was rerouted around Wadsworth; the old route was redesignated FM 2078. On October 24, 1956, a 1.3-mile section of FM 521 from Brazoria northeastward was transferred to SH 332. On December 14, 1981, the road was extended over a former routing of SH 288 to US 90 Alt. in Houston. On June 27, 1995, the section from FM 2234 to US 90 Alt. was transferred to Urban Road 521 (UR 521). The designation of this segment reverted to FM 521 with the elimination of the Urban Road system on November 15, 2018.

== FM 522 ==
Farm to Market Road 522
- Location: Brazoria County
- Length: 4.828 mi (7.770 km)
- Existed: July 9, 1945–present

Farm to Market Road 522 (FM 522) is located in Brazoria County. It runs from FM 1459 (west of Wild Peach Village to SH 36 in Wild Peach Village.

FM 522 was designated on July 9, 1945, from SH 36, 2 miles (3.2 km) southeast of West Columbia to Blacks Ferry. On May 2, 1962, it was extended southwest to FM 1459.

== FM 523 ==
Farm to Market Road 523
- Location: Brazoria County
- Length: 25.777 mi (41.484 km)
- Existed: July 9, 1945–present

Farm to Market Road 523 (FM 523) is located in Brazoria County. it runs from SH 288 in Freeport to FM 521. FM 523 was designated on July 9, 1945, from SH 288 in Freeport to Stratton Ridge. On July 22, 1949, FM 523 was extended to SH 35, replacing FM 1091. On December 4, 1961, the northern terminus in Angleton was relocated. On May 23, 1983, the old location of FM 523 via Downing Street was given to the city of Angleton. On September 29, 1992, FM 523 was extended to FM 521, replacing Loop 558 and FM 3507.

== FM 524 ==
Farm to Market Road 524
- Location: Brazoria County
- Length: 16.907 mi (27.209 km)
- Existed: July 9, 1945–present

Farm to Market Road 524 (FM 524) is located in Brazoria County. It runs from FM 1301 near West Columbia to FM 521.

FM 524 was designated on July 9, 1945, from Brazoria via Sweeny to SH 35. On January 16, 1953, a 6.1-mile section of FM 524 was transferred to FM 521. On June 9, 1958, a section from FM 1301 to SH 35 was added, replacing FM 1089. On April 29, 2012, the road was rerouted around the ConocoPhillips facility northwest of Sweeny due to security concerns.

== FM 525 ==
Farm to Market Road 525
- Location: Harris County
- Length: 7.057 mi (11.357 km)
- Existed: June 21, 1945–present

Farm to Market Road 525 (FM 525) is located in Harris County. It runs from I-45 west to I-69/US 59 on the north side of Houston. The road is known locally as Aldine-Bender Road.

FM 525 was designated on June 21, 1945, from US 59, 10 miles (16 km) north of Houston, west to US 75 (now I-45). On March 1, 1961, the eastern terminus was relocated south to link up with a proposed interchange at Lee Road and US 59. On June 30, 1995, the entire route was transferred to Urban Road 525 (UR 525). On May 29, 2014, FM 525 was rerouted back to its 1945 configuration (the old route following Lee Road was redesignated FM Spur 525) and extended east 0.3 miles (0.48 km) to Marine Road. The designation of the route reverted to FM 525 with the elimination of the Urban Road system on November 15, 2018.

== FM 526 ==
Farm to Market Road 526
- Location: Harris County
- Length: 4.625 mi (7.443 km)
- Existed: June 21, 1941–present

Farm to Market Road 526 (FM 526) is located in Harris County.

FM 526 begins at an interchange with I-10 in Houston, heading northwest on Federal Road, then curves north to become Maxey Road. FM 526 reaches an interchange with the US 90 freeway, where it merges into the frontage roads of that highway. FM 526 splits from US 90 by heading north on South Lake Houston Parkway. It then turns northwest before ending at Bus. US 90.

FM 526 was designated on June 21, 1941, as a spur from US 90 northeast of Houston south 6 miles (9.7 km) to the Market Street Road. On November 19, 1952, the road was rerouted to end at SH 73 (now I-10). On September 18, 1961, the northern terminus was relocated to a new alignment of US 90, replacing FM 2613. The old route is now Oates Road. On June 27, 1995, the designation was changed to Urban Road 526 (UR 526). The designation reverted to FM 526 with the elimination of the Urban Road system on November 15, 2018.

== FM 527 ==
Farm to Market Road 527
- Location: Harris County
- Existed: June 21, 1945–August 23, 1991

Farm to Market Road 527 (FM 527) was located in Harris County. There is no highway currently using the FM 527 designation.

FM 527 was designated on June 21, 1945, from US 90 northeast of Houston, west and north 6 miles (9.7 km) to a point near Dyersdale. This route followed what is now Liberty Road, Houston Road, Fields Street and Mesa Drive. On November 1, 1967, the southern terminus was relocated and FM 527 followed Mesa Drive for the entire route. By district request, FM 527 was canceled on August 23, 1991, and removed from the highway system; the portion from US 90 to the north Houston city limits was returned to the city of Houston; the remaining portion was returned to Harris County.

== FM 528 ==
Farm to Market Road 528
- Location: Brazoria, Galveston, and Harris counties
- Length: 9.941 mi (15.998 km)
- Existed: June 21, 1945–present

Farm to Market Road 528 (FM 528) is located in Harris, Galveston and Brazoria counties. It runs from Bus. SH 35 in Alvin northeast to I-45 in Webster.

FM 528 was designated on June 21, 1945, from US 75 (now I-45) east to SH 146 at Seabrook. On December 17, 1952, the road was extended west to FM 518. On January 16, 1953, the road was extended west to SH 35 (later Loop 409; now Bus. SH 35) north of Alvin, replacing FM 1461. The section from I-45 east to SH 146 was transferred to NASA Road 1 on January 27, 1965. On June 27, 1995, the entire route was redesignated Urban Road 528 (UR 528). On March 25, 2010, the designation was extended southwest to SH 6, however this section remains unbuilt. The designation of the route reverted to FM 528 with the elimination of the Urban Road system on November 15, 2018.

Junction list

County	Location	mi	km	Destinations	Notes
Brazoria	Alvin	0.0	0.0	Bus. SH 35-C (North Gordon Street)	
Brazoria	Alvin	0.6	0.97	SH 35 (North Alvin Bypass)	
Galveston	Friendswood	5.9	9.5	FM 518 (South Friendswood Drive)	
Harris	Webster	9.8	15.8	I-45 – Houston, Galveston	Continues east as NASA Parkway toward NASA Road 1
1.000 mi = 1.609 km; 1.000 km = 0.621 mi

== FM 529 ==
Farm to Market Road 529
- Location: Austin, Waller, and Harris counties
- Length: 42.011 mi (67.610 km)
- Existed: June 21, 1945–present

Farm to Market Road 529 (FM 529) is located in Austin, Waller, and Harris counties. It runs from US 290 near Houston to SH 159 in Bellville.

FM 529 was designated on June 21, 1945, from US 290, 10 miles (16 km) northwest of Houston, west 7.0 miles (11.3 km) to an oil field. On June 28, 1963, it was extended west to the Waller County line. On May 6, 1964, the road was again extended west to FM 362. On June 1, 1965, a section from FM 362 west to FM 331 was added. On April 6, 1970, the road was extended to SH 159 at Bellville, replacing a section of FM 331. On June 27, 1995, the segment from US 290 to SH 99 was transferred to Urban Road 529 (UR 529). The designation of this section reverted to FM 529 with the elimination of the Urban Road system on November 15, 2018.

Junction list

County	Location	mi	km	Destinations	Notes
Austin	Bellville	0	0.0	SH 159 – La Grange, Hempstead	Western terminus
Austin		6.9	11.1	FM 331 south – Sealy	Western end of FM 331 concurrency
Austin		7.3	11.7	FM 331 north – Raccoon Bend	Eastern end of FM 331 concurrency
Waller		14.5	23.3	FM 359 – Brookshire, Hempstead	
Waller		18.5	29.8	FM 362 north – Waller	Western end of FM 362 concurrency
Waller		21.5	34.6	FM 362 south – Brookshire	Eastern end of FM 362 concurrency
Waller		25.7	41.4	FM 2855	
Harris		33.7	54.2	SH 99 Toll (Grand Parkway)	
Harris	Houston	40.5	65.2	SH 6	Former FM 1960
Harris	Jersey Village	45.1	72.6	US 290 (Northwest Freeway) – Cypress, Houston	Eastern terminus; interchange
1.000 mi = 1.609 km; 1.000 km = 0.621 mi: Concurrency terminus; Tolled

== FM 530 ==
Farm to Market Road 530
- Location: Lavaca and Jackson counties
- Length: 42.899 mi (69.039 km)
- Existed: July 9, 1945–present

Farm to Market Road 530 (FM 530) is located in Lavaca and Jackson counties. It runs from US 90 Alt. to US 59 (future I-69) northeast of Edna.

FM 530 was designated on July 9, 1945, from SH 200 (now US 90 Alt.) in Lavaca County southeast 6.0 miles (9.7 km) toward Vienna. It has been extended southeast several times: by 4.45 miles (7.16 km) to Vienna on August 26, 1948; by 8.4 miles (13.5 km) on January 27, 1950; by 3.2 miles (5.1 km) to a road intersection on May 23, 1951; by 3.0 miles (4.8 km) to the Jackson County line on November 20, 1951; and to its current southern terminus at US 59 on January 16, 1953, replacing FM 719. On July 25, 1960, the northern terminus of FM 530 was relocated.

== FM 531 ==
Farm to Market Road 531
- Location: Lavaca County
- Length: 20.490 mi (32.975 km)
- Existed: July 9, 1945–present

Farm to Market Road 531 (FM 531) is located in Lavaca County. It runs from US 90 Alt. east of Shiner to Ezzell.

FM 531 was designated on July 9, 1945, from then-Spur 27 at Sweet Home to Koerth. On November 20, 1946, the road was extended to three miles (4.8 km) north of US 77, replacing Spur 27 and FM 534. On July 14, 1949, FM 531 was extended northwest to SH 200 (now US 90 Alt.) and east to its current end, replacing FM 959.

== FM 532 ==
Farm to Market Road 532
- Location: Gonzales, Lavaca, and Colorado counties
- Length: 43.486 mi (69.984 km)
- Existed: July 9, 1945–present

Farm to Market Road 532 (FM 532) is located in Gonzales, Lavaca, and Colorado counties. It runs from US 90 Alt. east of Gonzales to FM 155.

FM 532 was designated on July 9, 1945, from SH 95 in Moulton to a point 6 miles (9.7 km) east toward Moravia. On November 23, 1948, the road was extended west 5.2 miles (8.4 km) from Moulton, and extended east 2.2 miles (3.5 km) on July 14, 1949. On March 21, 1950, the road was extended to SH 200 (now US 90 Alt.) east of Gonzales, replacing FM 793. On December 17, 1952, the road was extended 1.9 miles (3.1 km) to FM 957, creating a concurrency with SH 95. On September 29, 1954, the road was extended east 4.2 miles (6.8 km) to US 77. On September 27, 1960, the road was extended 2.8 miles (4.5 km) northeast from US 77, creating a concurrency with US 77. On July 29, 1963 (connecting section designated June 28), the road was extended to FM 155, replacing FM 1290.

== FM 533 ==
Farm to Market Road 533
- Location: Lavaca and Gonzales counties
- Length: 8.041 mi (12.941 km)
- Existed: July 9, 1945–present

Farm to Market Road 533 (FM 533) is located in Lavaca and Gonzales counties. It runs from US 90 Alt. northwest of Shiner to FM 443.

FM 533 was designated on July 9, 1945, from SH 200 (now US 90 Alt.), 1 mile (1.6 km) northwest of Shiner, to a point 3 miles (4.8 km) southwest. On July 28, 1955, the road was extended 5.5 miles (8.9 km) west, south and west to FM 443.

== FM 534 ==
Farm to Market Road 534
- Location: Bee, Live Oak, and Jim Wells counties
- Length: 28.166 mi (45.329 km)
- Existed: May 23, 1951–present

Farm to Market Road 534 (FM 534) is located in Bee, Live Oak, and Jim Wells counties. It runs from FM 796 to SH 359 northeast of Orange Grove.

FM 534 was designated on May 23, 1951, from FM 796, 2.5 miles (4.0 km) south of Clareville, west to the Live Oak County line. The same day the road was extended southwest 5 miles (8.0 km) to SH 9 (now I-37) at Swinney. On November 20, 1951, the road was extended southwest 3.2 miles (5.1 km) to Dinero. On May 18, 1966, the road was extended 17.3 miles (27.8 km) to SH 359 northeast of Orange Grove, replacing FM 2287.

=== FM 534 (1945) ===
Farm to Market Road 534
- Location: Lavaca County
- Existed: July 9, 1945–November 20, 1946

A previous route numbered FM 534 was designated on July 9, 1945, from US 77 at Spur 27 to a point 3 miles (4.8 km) north. FM 534 was cancelled on November 20, 1946, and became a portion of FM 531.

== FM 535 ==
Farm to Market Road 535
- Location: Bastrop County
- Length: 33.425 mi (53.792 km)
- Existed: July 9, 1945–present

Farm to Market Road 535 (FM 535) is a 33.4-mile (53.8 km) route located in Bastrop County.

FM 535 begins at the Bastrop–Travis county line. From there, it proceeds southeast through the communities of Cedar Creek and Rockne to SH 304 near Rosanky. The road then takes a northeasterly turn to its terminus at SH 95 just south of Smithville.

FM 535 was designated from SH 95 at Smithville to Rosanky on July 9, 1945. On November 23, 1948, it was extended to FM 20 at Rockne. FM 535 was extended to SH 21 at Cedar Creek on September 29, 1954, and to the Bastrop County line on October 29, 1992.

Junction list

The entire route is in Bastrop County.

Location	mi	km	Destinations	Notes
Cedar Creek	5.9	9.5	SH 21	
Rockne	13.4	21.6	FM 20	
Rosanky	22.9	36.9	SH 304	
Smithville	33.4	53.8	SH 95	
1.000 mi = 1.609 km; 1.000 km = 0.621 mi

== FM 536 ==
Farm to Market Road 536
- Location: Atascosa and Wilson counties
- Length: 22.431 mi (36.099 km)
- Existed: July 9, 1945–present

Farm to Market Road 536 (FM 536) is located in Atascosa and Wilson counties. Its western terminus is at US 281 in Espey. It crosses I-37 at that route's exit 117. Its eastern terminus is at US 181 and SH 97 in Floresville.

FM 536 was designated on July 9, 1945, from SH 97 (now Loop 181) in Floresville west 6.0 miles (9.7 km) toward Fairview. On December 16, 1948, FM 536 was extended west 5.8 miles (9.3 km) to Fairview. On December 17, 1952, the road was extended west to the Atascosa County line. On January 29, 1953, FM 536 was extended west to US 281, replacing FM 1892. On October 23, 1965, FM 536 was extended east to US 181 and SH 97.

== FM 537 ==
Farm to Market Road 537
- Location: Wilson County
- Length: 13.070 mi (21.034 km)
- Existed: July 9, 1945–present

Farm to Market Road 537 (FM 537) is located in Wilson County. It runs from US 181 southeast of Floresville to SH 123 south of Stockdale.

FM 537 was designated on July 9, 1945, from US 181 south of Floresville to Sunnyside School. On October 23, 1954, the road was extended to SH 123 south of Stockdale, replacing FM 2200.

== FM 538 ==
Farm to Market Road 538
- Location: Wilson County
- Length: 3.267 mi (5.258 km)
- Existed: July 9, 1945–present

Farm to Market Road 538 (FM 538) is located in Wilson County. It runs from US 87 east of Stockdale to FM 1347 near the site of the former Lily Grove School.

FM 538 was designated on July 9, 1945, on the current route.

== FM 539 ==
Farm to Market Road 539
- Location: Wilson and Guadalupe
- Length: 19.936 mi (32.084 km)
- Existed: July 9, 1945–present

Farm to Market Road 539 (FM 539) is located in Wilson and Guadalupe counties. It runs from SH 97 northeast of Floresville to FM 467 southwest of Olmos.

FM 539 was designated on July 9, 1945, from US 87 in Old Sutherland Springs to a point 7.1 miles (11.4 km) towards Floresville. On December 18, 1951, the road was extended southwest 1.3 miles (2.1 km) to SH 97. On September 21, 1955, the road was extended 1.5 miles (2.4 km) northeast from Sutherland Springs. On October 31, 1958, the road was extended north 11 miles (18 km) to FM 467.

== FM 540 ==
Farm to Market Road 540
- Location: Jones and Fisher counties
- Length: 7.163 mi (11.528 km)
- Existed: December 13, 1956–present

Farm to Market Road 540 (FM 540) is located in Jones and Fisher counties. It runs from US 83 north of Hamlin westward and southward to SH 92.

FM 540 was designated on December 13, 1956, along the current route.

=== FM 540 (1945) ===
Farm to Market Road 540
- Location: Wilson County
- Existed: July 9, 1945–December 17, 1956

A previous route numbered FM 540 was designated in Wilson County on July 9, 1945, from SH 123 near the Guadalupe County line 3.5 miles (5.6 km) towards Swift School. FM 540 was cancelled on December 17, 1956, and became a portion of FM 1681.

== FM 541 ==
Farm to Market Road 541
- Location: Wilson County
- Length: 35.382 mi (56.942 km)
- Existed: July 9, 1945–present

Farm to Market Road 541 (FM 541) is located in Wilson County. It runs from SH 123 to US 281 southeast of Pleasanton.

FM 541 was designated on July 9, 1945, from US 181 in Poth to De Wees. On December 17, 1947, the road was extended 9.7 miles (15.6 km) toward Kosciusko. On December 16, 1948, the road was extended 3.1 miles (5.0 km) to Kosciusko and to SH 123, replacing Spur 113. On May 23, 1951, the road was extended southwest 4.9 miles (7.9 km) to a road intersection. On October 17, 1960, the road was extended southwest 13.5 miles (21.7 km) to US 281 southeast of Pleasanton, replacing FM 1335.

== FM 542 ==
Farm to Market Road 542
- Location: Leon County
- Length: 22.017 mi (35.433 km)
- Existed: July 9, 1945–present

Farm to Market Road 542 (FM 542) is located in Leon County. It runs from US 79 in Oakwood to SH 7 west of the Trinity River.

FM 542 was designated on July 9, 1945, from Oakwood south 8 miles (13 km) toward SH 7. On July 20, 1948, the road was extended south 11.8 miles (19.0 km). On November 21, 1956, the road was extended 5.6 miles (9.0 km) south to SH 7.

== FM 543 ==
Farm to Market Road 543
- Location: Collin County
- Length: 10.093 mi (16.243 km)
- Existed: July 9, 1945–present

Farm to Market Road 543 (FM 543) is located in Collin County. It runs from FM 455 at Weston to CR 206.

FM 543 was designated on July 9, 1945, from Anna to Weston and then to 1.5 miles (2.4 km) east of Roland. On January 29, 1953, an 8.6-mile (13.8 km) section was transferred to FM 455. On October 26, 1954, the road was extended south 2.7 miles (4.3 km) to US 75 (now SH 5). On December 16, 2013, a 1.5-mile (2.4 km) section from US 75 to CR 206 was removed altogether and the section from CR 206 to FM 455 was redesignated as Spur 195, but this was changed back to FM 543 on September 26, 2016, and the section from US 75 to SH 5 was redesignated as Spur 195.

== FM 544 ==
Farm to Market Road 544
- Location: Collin County
- Length: 10.920 mi (17.574 km)
- Existed: July 9, 1945–present

Farm to Market Road 544 (FM 544), known for most of its length as Parker Road, is located in Collin County. It runs from SH 121 eastward to west Plano city limits, and from east Plano city limits to SH 78. FM 544 passes through the cities of Plano, Murphy, and Wylie within Denton and Collin counties. The segment of FM 544 in Plano follows Parker Road, Plano Parkway, Charles Street, Hebron Parkway, Park Boulevard, Coit Road, 15th Street, G Avenue, and 14th Street.

FM 544 was designated on July 9, 1945, from SH 78 at Wylie to Plano. On November 23, 1948, FM 544 was extended west to SH 289 at Shepton. On November 20, 1951, FM 544 was extended west to SH 121, replacing FM 1383. On November 24, 1959, FM 544 was extended south to the Dallas County line. On January 6, 1978, the section from FM 544 from FM 3412 south to existing FM 544 was transferred to FM 1378, and the section of FM 544 from FM 1378 to SH 78 was renumbered as FM 3412. The old FM 3412 became a rerouting of FM 544. On October 28, 1987, the section of FM 544 in Plano was given to the city of Plano, creating a gap in the highway. On July 28, 1994, FM 544 was extended west from old SH 121 (now FM 2281) to current SH 121. On June 27, 1995, FM 544 was redesignated Urban Road 544 (UR 544). On August 31, 2000, the section of FM 544 from SH 78 to the Dallas County line was removed from the state highway system and given to the city of Wylie. The designation of the remaining segment reverted to FM 544 with the elimination of the Urban Road system on November 15, 2018.

Junction list

County	Location	mi	km	Destinations	Notes
Denton	Lewisville	0.00	0.00	Bus. SH 121 – Lewisville, McKinney	Western terminus
Denton	Lewisville	0.4	0.64	SH 121 (Frontage Road) / Sam Rayburn Tollway	
Denton	Lewisville	0.7	1.1	FM 2281 (Old Denton Road)	
Denton–Collin county line	Carrolton–Plano line	6.0	9.7	East end state maintenance	
Collin	Plano	7.3	11.7	Dallas North Tollway	
Collin	Plano	9.3	15.0	SH 289 (Preston Road)	
Collin	Plano	14.3	23.0	US 75 (North Central Expressway)	US 75 exit 28A northbound, exit 29 southbound
Collin	Plano–Murphy line	19.1	30.7	West end state maintenance	
Collin	Murphy	20.2	32.5	FM 2551 north (Murphy Road) – Parker	
Collin	Wylie	22.6	36.4	Country Club Road to FM 1378	
Collin	Wylie	24.1	38.8	SH 78 – Garland, Lavon	Eastern terminus; road continues as Kirby Street
1.000 mi = 1.609 km; 1.000 km = 0.621 mi: Electronic toll collection

== FM 545 ==
Farm to Market Road 545
- Location: Collin County
- Length: 11.077 mi (17.827 km)
- Existed: July 9, 1945–present

Farm to Market Road 545 (FM 545) is located in Collin County. It runs from Bus. SH 78 in Blue Ridge to SH 121.

FM 545 was designated on July 9, 1945, from SH 78 (later Loop 137, now Bus. SH 78) in Blue Ridge to US 75 (now SH 5) in Melissa. On October 29, 2009, a 0.7-mile (1.1 km) section from SH 5 to SH 121 was turned over to the city of Melissa.

== FM 546 ==
Farm to Market Road 546
- Location: Collin County
- Length: 11.182 mi (17.996 km)
- Existed: July 9, 1945–present

Farm to Market Road 546 (FM 546) is located in Collin County. It runs from SH 5 in McKinney to FM 982 east of Branch.

FM 546 was designated on July 9, 1945, from US 75 (now SH 5) in McKinney to Biggers. On September 21, 1955, the road was extended southeast 6.5 miles (10.5 km) to FM 982. The route was rerouted in McKinney on November 16, 1965, and was realigned due to an airport runway extension on May 24, 1989.

== FM 547 ==
Farm to Market Road 547
- Location: Collin County
- Length: 7.876 mi (12.675 km)
- Existed: July 9, 1945–present

Farm to Market Road 547 (FM 547) is located in Collin County.

FM 547 begins at an intersection with FM 6 in Nevada. The highway runs north along Moore Street to County Road 850 and turns to the west. FM 547 runs west until FM 1778 and turns back to the north. FM 547 ends at an intersection with US 380 just east of Farmersville.

FM 547 was designated on July 9, 1945, on its current route.

== FM 548 ==
Farm to Market Road 548
- Location: Kaufman and Rockwall counties
- Length: 23.284 mi (Note: The certified mileage given is shorter than the actual mileage as TxDOT considers FM 548 to be discontinuous at rather than concurrent with SH 205.) (37.472 km)
- Existed: July 9, 1945–present

Farm to Market Road 548 (FM 548) is located in Kaufman and Rockwall counties in the eastern portion of the Dallas–Fort Worth metroplex.

FM 548 begins at an intersection with FM 740 just south of Forney. FM 548 travels northeast for about two miles (3.2 km) before intersecting FM 741, near Forney High School. At the intersection with FM 1641, FM 548 runs in a more north–south direction, intersecting with FM 688 and US 80. The highway turns back to the northeast at Marketplace Drive, the location of a major shopping center in the town. Leaving Forney, FM 548 travels by many subdivisions before taking a more rural route.

Entering Rockwall County, the highway enters the town of McLendon-Chisholm. In the community, FM 548 shares a short overlap with SH 205. Exiting the town, the highway continues to run in a northeast direction, before making a nearly 90-degree turn to the northwest. Just south of the intersection with SH 276, FM 548 turns to the north, entering Royse City a few miles to the north. The highway intersects with I-30 before ending at SH 66 in downtown.

The first section of FM 548 ran from SH 205 near McLendon-Chisholm to US 67 (now SH 66) in downtown Royse City; this section was designated on July 9, 1945. On November 4, 1955, the section from FM 1143 west to then-FM 551 was transferred to FM 1143 (which became part of SH 276 on November 26, 1969) and the section from FM 550 to SH 205 was transferred to FM 550. FM 548 was rerouted over FM 1142 (which was cancelled as a result) from FM 1143 to SH 205. On May 25, 1962, the highway was extended further south to I-20 (now US 80) in Forney, replacing FM 2081. On January 26, 1986, the highway rerouted north of I-20. The routing between FM 740 and US 80 was transferred back to Kaufman County and the city of Forney. On October 29, 1998, FM 548 was extended southwest to FM 740 near the new route of I-20.

Junction list

County	Location	mi	km	Destinations	Notes
Kaufman		0.0	0.0	FM 740 – Seagoville, Forney	
Kaufman	Forney	2.1	3.4	FM 741 (College Avenue) – Forney, Crandall	
Kaufman	Forney	3.0	4.8	FM 1641 south – Talty	
Kaufman	Forney	3.2	5.1	FM 688 west (Broad Street)	
Kaufman	Forney	3.3	5.3	US 80 – Dallas, Terrell	Interchange
Rockwall	McLendon-Chisholm	11.1	17.9	SH 205 south – Terrell	South end of SH 205 overlap
Rockwall	McLendon-Chisholm	11.6	18.7	SH 205 north – Rockwall	North end of SH 205 overlap
Rockwall		19.0	30.6	SH 276 – Rockwall, Quinlan	
Rockwall	Royse City	23.9	38.5	I-30 (US 67) – Rockwall, Greenville	I-30 exit 77A
Rockwall	Royse City	24.4	39.3	SH 66 – Rockwall, Caddo Mills	
1.000 mi = 1.609 km; 1.000 km = 0.621 mi: Concurrency terminus

== FM 549 ==
Farm to Market Road 549
- Location: Rockwall County
- Length: 5.784 mi (Note: The certified length given is shorter than the actual mileage, as the TxDOT description of FM 549 considers it to be discontinuous at rather than concurrent with SH 205 in Rockwall.) (9.308 km)
- Existed: July 9, 1945–present

Farm to Market Road 549 (FM 549) is located in Rockwall County.

FM 549 runs from an intersection with FM 550/FM 740 in Heath to SH 205 in southern Rockwall. FM 549 has a short overlap with SH 205. The highway ends at an intersection with SH 276. In Heath the highway is known as Buffalo Way and Hubbard Road.

FM 549 was designated on July 9, 1945, from US 67 (this section was redesignated as part of FM 7 on July 16, 1957, and FM 7 was redesignated as SH 66 on November 30, 1961) to SH 205. On June 1, 1965, FM 549 was extended southwest to FM 740. On May 25, 1976, FM 549 was extended north to FM 552. On September 24, 2009, the section from I-30 to SH 276 was given to the city of Rockwall, so the section north of I-30 was renumbered FM 3549.

Junction list

The entire route is in Rockwall County.

Location	mi	km	Destinations	Notes
Heath	0.0	0.0	FM 550 south (McLendon Road) / FM 740 (Laurence Drive) – McLendon-Chisholm, Forney, Rockwall	
Heath–Rockwall line	2.4	3.9	FM 3097 north (Horizon Road)	Texas Health Presbyterian Rockwall
Rockwall	3.7	6.0	SH 205 south – Terrell	South end of SH 205 overlap
Rockwall	4.0	6.4	SH 205 north – Rockwall	North end of SH 205 overlap
Rockwall	4.4	7.1	FM 1139 east to FM 550	
Rockwall	6.2	10.0	SH 276 – Rockwall, Quinlan	
1.000 mi = 1.609 km; 1.000 km = 0.621 mi

== FM 550 ==
Farm to Market Road 550
- Location: Rockwall County
- Length: 10.151 mi (16.336 km)
- Existed: July 9, 1945–present

Farm to Market Road 550 (FM 550) is located in Rockwall County.

FM 550 begins at an intersection with FM 549/FM 740 in Heath. The highway runs east to McLendon-Chisholm where it intersects with SH 205. FM 550 runs north from SH 205 to its terminus at SH 276.

FM 550 was designated on July 9, 1945, from Rockwall, southward via Heath to SH 205. On November 4, 1955, the section north of FM 740 was transferred to FM 740, and FM 550 replaced a section of FM 548 northeast to FM 1143 (now SH 276).

Junction list

The entire route is in Rockwall County.

Location	mi	km	Destinations	Notes
Heath			FM 549 north / FM 740 – Forney	
McLendon-Chisholm			SH 205 – Rockwall, Terrell	
McLendon-Chisholm			FM 1139 west	
			SH 276 – Rockwall, Quinlan	
1.000 mi = 1.609 km; 1.000 km = 0.621 mi

== FM 551 ==
Farm to Market Road 551
- Location: Rockwall County
- Length: 3.400 mi (5.472 km)
- Existed: July 9, 1945–present

Farm to Market Road 551 (FM 551) is located in Rockwall County. It runs from SH 276 near Rockwall to SH 66 in Fate.

FM 551 was designated on July 9, 1945, from Blackland to Fate. On November 4, 1955, a 1.4-mile (2.3 km) section from FM 1143 (now SH 276) to Blackland was transferred to FM 1143. On November 26, 1969, FM 551 was extended south 0.1 miles (0.16 km) over old FM 1143 to SH 276.

== FM 552 ==
Farm to Market Road 552
- Location: Rockwall County
- Length: 5.364 mi (8.633 km)
- Existed: July 9, 1945–present

Farm to Market Road 552 (FM 552) is located in Rockwall County. It runs from SH 205 in Rockwall to SH 66 north of Fate.

FM 552 was designated on July 9, 1945, on the current route.

== FM 553 ==
Farm to Market Road 553
- Location: Freestone County
- Length: 0.772 mi (1,242 m)
- Existed: November 25, 1975–present

Farm to Market Road 553 (FM 553) is located in Freestone County. It runs from SH 179 to US 84 in eastern Teague.

FM 553 was designated on November 25, 1975, on the current route.

=== FM 553 (1945) ===
Farm to Market Road 553
- Location: Upshur County
- Existed: July 13, 1945–June 19, 1967

A previous route numbered FM 553 was designated on July 13, 1945, from SH 154, 1 mile (1.6 km) west of Gilmer, northwest to Enon. On November 23, 1948, the road was extended to Grice. On June 2, 1967, the road was extended northwest to FM 852. FM 553 was cancelled on June 19, 1967, and became a portion of FM 852, but was not signed as FM 852 until January 1, 1968.

== FM 554 ==
Farm to Market Road 554
- Location: Ector County
- Length: 7.212 mi (11.607 km)
- Existed: October 26, 1983–present

Farm to Market Road 554 (FM 554) is located in Ector County. It runs from SH 158 in Gardendale to Loop 338.

FM 554 was designated on October 26, 1983, on the current route.

=== FM 554 (1945) ===
Farm to Market Road 554
- Location: Upshur County
- Existed: July 13, 1945–August 3, 1971

A previous route numbered FM 554 was designated on July 13, 1945, from SH 154 just west of Gilmer southwest to Latch. On November 20, 1961, the road was extended to FM 1002. FM 554 was cancelled on August 3, 1971: the section from FM 49 to SH 154 was transferred to FM 49 and the section from FM 1002 to FM 49 was transferred to FM 1795.

== FM 555 ==
Farm to Market Road 555
- Location: Upshur County
- Length: 10.862 mi (17.481 km)
- Existed: July 13, 1945–present

Farm to Market Road 555 (FM 555) is located in Upshur County. It runs from SH 155 to SH 154 east of Gilmer.

FM 555 was designated on July 13, 1945, from SH 154, 2 miles (3.2 km) east of Gilmer, to Sand Hill. On August 24, 1955, the road was extended northwest 5.3 miles (8.5 km) to SH 155.

== FM 556 ==
Farm to Market Road 556
- Location: Camp and Upshur counties
- Length: 18.860 mi (30.352 km)
- Existed: July 9, 1945–present

Farm to Market Road 556 (FM 556) is located in Camp and Upshur counties. It runs from Bus. US 271 in Pittsburg to FM 852 near Enon.

FM 556 was designated on July 9, 1945, from what would later be Loop 238 (now Bus. US 271) in Pittsburg via Hickory Hill to Lilly Creek. On September 28, 1949, the road was extended 2.9 miles (4.7 km) to Martinburg at the Upshur County line. On December 17, 1952, the road was extended southwest 3.7 miles (6.0 km) to FM 852. On October 29, 1953, the road was extended 8 miles (13 km) to FM 553 (now FM 852).

== FM 557 ==
Farm to Market Road 557
- Location: Camp and Upshur counties
- Length: 16.929 mi (27.245 km)
- Existed: July 9, 1945–present

Farm to Market Road 557 (FM 557) is located in Camp and Upshur counties. It runs from SH 11 in Pittsburg to US 259.

FM 557 was designated on July 9, 1945, from Pittsburg to Ebenezer School. On September 28, 1949, the road was extended southeast 12.3 miles (19.8 km) to SH 26 (now US 259).

== FM 558 ==
Farm to Market Road 558
- Location: Bowie County
- Length: 5.883 mi (9.468 km)
- Existed: July 9, 1945–present

Farm to Market Road 558 (FM 558) is located in Bowie County. It runs from SH 93 in Texarkana southward 5.9 miles (9.5 km) along Buchanan Road before state maintenance ends.

FM 558 was designated on July 9, 1945, from SH 11 (later US 59, now SH 93) to Cross-Road. On June 27, 1995, the section from SH 93 to FM 2519 was transferred to Urban Road 558 (UR 558). The designation of that segment reverted to FM 558 with the elimination of the Urban Road system on November 15, 2018.

== FM 559 ==
Farm to Market Road 559
- Location: Bowie County
- Length: 11.214 mi (18.047 km)
- Existed: July 9, 1945–present

Farm to Market Road 559 (FM 559) is located in the Texarkana metropolitan area. It is known locally as Richmond Road.

FM 559 begins at an intersection with SH 93 (Summerhill Road) just northwest of downtown Texarkana. The highway runs northwest along Richmond Road, passing just west of Texarkana College. FM 559 intersects Interstate 30/US 59 near Central Mall, running through a heavily developed area of northern Texarkana before entering the Pleasant Grove area of the city. The highway intersects Farm to Market Road 2878 (just south of Texas A&M University–Texarkana) and Farm to Market Road 989 before leaving the city. FM 559 intersects Farm to Market Road 1397 in Wamba before taking a more rural course. FM 559 ends a few miles north of FM 2253, continuing as a county road.

FM 559 originally ran further into Texarkana along 24th Street to US 82, with the north end in Wamba; this section was designated on July 9, 1945. The highway was then extended further north to County Road 2302 on December 17, 1952, where the road ends today. On September 30, 1970, the section of FM 559 along 24th Street was returned to the city of Texarkana as US 59 was rerouted west of the city. The section of FM 559 from SH 93 to FM 989 was redesignated Urban Road 559 (UR 559) on June 27, 1995. The designation of that segment reverted to FM 559 with the elimination of the Urban Road system on November 15, 2018.

Junction list

The entire route is in Bowie County.

Location	mi	km	Destinations	Notes
Texarkana	0.0	0.0	SH 93 (Summerhill Road)	
Texarkana	1.6	2.6	I-30 / US 59 – Dallas, Little Rock	I-30 exit 220B
Texarkana	2.4	3.9	FM 1297 west (McKnight Road)	
Texarkana	2.9	4.7	FM 2240 east (Moores Lane)	
Texarkana	4.1	6.6	FM 2878 south (Pleasant Grove Road) / University Avenue – Texas A&M University–Texarkana	
Texarkana	4.3	6.9	FM 989 south (Kings Highway) – Nash	
Wamba	5.8	9.3	FM 1397 south	
	10.1	16.3	FM 2253 south – Leary	
	11.2	18.0	County Road 2302	North end of FM 559; continues north as County Road 2301
1.000 mi = 1.609 km; 1.000 km = 0.621 mi

== FM 560 ==
Farm to Market Road 560
- Location: Bowie County
- Length: 4.929 mi (7.932 km)
- Existed: July 9, 1945–present

Farm to Market Road 560 (FM 560) is located in Bowie County. It runs from US 82 in Hooks to CR 2106 north of Burns.

FM 560 was designated on July 9, 1945, along the current route.

== FM 561 ==
Farm to Market Road 561
- Location: Bowie County
- Length: 11.473 mi (18.464 km)
- Existed: July 9, 1945–present

Farm to Market Road 561 (FM 561) is located in Bowie County. It runs from US 259 to SH 98 north of Simms.

FM 561 was designated on July 9, 1945, from SH 26 (now US 259), 2 miles (3.2 km) south of De Kalb, to College Hill and beyond, then east via Siloam to Simms. On September 12, 1946, the road was extended west 4 miles (6.4 km) from SH 26, replacing FM 654 and creating a concurrency with SH 26. On May 23, 1951, the road was extended 4.6 miles (7.4 km) to FM 911 in Lydia. On February 13, 1958, the road was rerouted on a new route to SH 98, replacing FM 1996; the section from Lydia to the end of existing FM 1996 was transferred to FM 44, although this did not become effective until the 1958 Official Travel Map was released.

== FM 562 ==
Farm to Market Road 562
- Location: Chambers County
- Length: 22.564 mi (36.313 km)
- Existed: July 9, 1945–present

Farm to Market Road 562 (FM 562) is located in Chambers County. It runs from SH 61/SH 65 south 10 miles (16 km), then southwest 15.9 miles (25.6 km) to Smith Point.

FM 562 was designated on July 9, 1945, from the junction of SH 61 and SH 73T (now SH 65) south 10.0 miles (16.1 km) to 2.6 miles (4.2 km) south of Double Bayou. On January 27, 1950, it was extended southwest to Smith Point. On May 2, 1962, the road was proposed to be extended 0.9 miles (1.4 km) southwest through Smith Point, but that extension was cancelled on August 27, 1962, along with all of FM 2795, in exchange for extending FM 2354 south and west to FM 1405.

== FM 563 ==
Farm to Market Road 563
- Location: Liberty and Chambers counties
- Length: 27.545 mi (44.329 km)
- Existed: June 12, 1945–present

Farm to Market Road 563 (FM 563) is located in Liberty and Chambers counties. It runs from US 90/SH 146 in Liberty to an intersection with Crossover Road.

FM 563 was designated on June 12, 1945, from Turtle Bayou to the Liberty/Wallisville Road crossing SH 73 (now I-10) near Eminence. On September 9, 1947, the road was extended north to US 90 in Liberty and south to SH 61 in Anahuac. On September 27, 1960, the road was extended 4 miles (6.4 km) south from SH 61 (this section was originally planned as a rerouted FM 564).

== FM 564 ==
Farm to Market Road 564 (FM 564) is a designation that has been used twice. There is no highway currently using the FM 564 designation.

=== FM 564 (1945) ===
Farm to Market Road 564
- Location: Chambers County
- Existed: July 9, 1945–April 10, 1965

The first route numbered FM 564 was designated on July 9, 1945, from Anahuac south 4.1 miles (6.6 km) to Scherer. On September 27, 1960, FM 564 was to be relocated to the road from SH 61 and FM 563 southward 4.0 miles (6.4 km). Construction on the new road was completed by April 10, 1965, when FM 564 was removed from the state highway system; it is now Main Street. The new road that was to become new FM 564 became part of FM 563 instead.

=== FM 564 (1968) ===
Farm to Market Road 564
- Location: Wood County
- Length: 7.455 mi (11.998 km)
- Existed: July 11, 1968–March 25, 2010

The second route numbeed FM 564 was designated on July 11, 1968, from US 69 northwest of Mineola south to US 80. On February 1, 1973, the road was extended around the city back to its northern terminus, forming a loop. FM 564 was cancelled on March 25, 2010, and redesignated as Loop 564.

== FM 565 ==
Farm to Market Road 565
- Location: Chambers County
- Length: 15.470 mi (24.897 km)
- Existed: July 9, 1945–present

Farm to Market Road 565 (FM 565) is located in Chambers County.

The road starts at SH 146 in Baytown and travels east. It intersects FM 1405 and SH 99 Toll near the Royal Purple Raceway. Next, it intersects FM 2354 and FM 3180. In Cove, it intersects FM 3246 and Interstate 10 (I-10). In Old River-Winfree, it intersects FM 1409, and in Mont Belvieu, it intersects Loop 207 and ends at SH 146.

When it was created on July 9, 1945, it was only 2.0 miles (3.2 km) long from Mont Belvieu to Old River-Winfree. On November 23, 1948, it was extended from Old River-Winfree through Cove to Baytown at SH 146. FM 565's northern terminus was extended from Loop 207 to SH 146 in Mont Belvieu in 2019 when Loop 207 was removed.

Junction list

The entire road is in Chambers County.

Location	mi	km	Destinations	Notes
Baytown			SH 146	Southern terminus
Baytown			FM 1405	
Baytown			SH 99 Toll (Grand Parkway)	
Baytown			FM 2354 south – Beach City	
Baytown			FM 3180	
Baytown			FM 1409 north	
Cove			FM 3246 north / Gou Hole Road	
Cove			I-10 – Houston, Beaumont	I-10 exit 803
Old River-Winfree			FM 1409 – Dayton	
			SH 99 Toll (Grand Parkway)	
			SH 146	Northern terminus
1.000 mi = 1.609 km; 1.000 km = 0.621 mi: Tolled

== FM 566 ==
Farm to Market Road 566
- Location: Ellis County
- Length: 0.863 mi (1,389 m)
- Existed: May 6, 1964–present

Farm to Market Road 566 (FM 566) is located in Ellis County. It runs from US 77 in Milford to I-35E exit 381.

FM 566 was designated on May 6, 1964, along the current route.

=== FM 566 (1945) ===
Farm to Market Road 566
- Location: Coleman County
- Existed: July 18, 1945–October 14, 1960

A previous route numbered FM 566 was designated in Coleman County on July 18, 1945, from US 67 in Valera south 6.2 miles (10.0 km) to West Road 3.5 miles (5.6 km) north of Voss. On July 15, 1949, the road was extended south 3.5 miles (5.6 km) to Voss. On December 17, 1952, the road was extended south 4.3 miles (6.9 km) to a road intersection. On April 25, 1960, the northern terminus was relocated, shortening the road by 0.6 miles (0.97 km). FM 566 was cancelled on October 14, 1960, and transferred to FM 503.

== FM 567 ==
Farm to Market Road 567
- Location: Coleman County
- Length: 3.465 mi (5.576 km)
- Existed: July 18, 1945–present

Farm to Market Road 567 (FM 567) is located in Coleman County. It runs from US 84 east to Santa Anna to FM 1176.

FM 567 was designated on July 18, 1945, from US 84, 4.5 miles (7.2 km) east of Santa Anna, south 2.5 miles (4.0 km) to an east–west road 2.4 miles (3.9 km) northeast of Cleveland. On June 28, 1963, the road was extended west 1.3 miles (2.1 km) to FM 1176.

== FM 568 ==
Farm to Market Road 568
- Location: Coleman County
- Length: 12.323 mi (19.832 km)
- Existed: July 18, 1945–present

Farm to Market Road 568 (FM 568) is located in Coleman County. It runs from SH 206 in Coleman to an intersection with County Roads 127 and 134.

FM 568 was designated on July 18, 1945, from US 84, 2 miles (3.2 km) southeast of Coleman, east 4.5 miles (7.2 km) to an intersection with Echo Road. The route description was changed on August 4, 1945, to go from US 84, 3 miles (4.8 km) southeast of Coleman, east and south 4.5 miles (7.2 km). On January 27, 1948, the route was changed again, to go from US 84, 2.3 miles (3.7 km) southeast of Coleman, east 5.3 miles (8.5 km). On November 23, 1948, the road was extended south to US 67/US 84 near Santa Anna. This section was renumbered as FM 1176 on April 13, 1949. On October 16, 1951, the road was extended east and northeast 3.6 miles (5.8 km) to a road intersection, and extended northeast another 2.2 miles (3.5 km) to a second road intersection on November 20, 1951. On October 24, 1955, the road was extended to SH 206, replacing Loop 175.

== FM 569 ==
Farm to Market Road 569
- Location: Eastland County
- Length: 21.002 mi (33.799 km)
- Existed: July 23, 1945–present

Farm to Market Road 569 (FM 569) is located in Eastland County. It runs from SH 206 southwest of Cisco to SH 36 south of Pioneer.

FM 569 was designated on July 23, 1945, from US 80 (now I-20), 1 mile (1.6 km) west of Cisco, to the Nimrod Road. On July 14, 1949, the road was extended southwest 4 miles (6.4 km) to Nimrod. On October 28, 1953, the road was extended 15.2 miles (24.5 km) to SH 36. On June 27, 1963, the section from US 80 to a point 2 miles (3.2 km) south was transferred to SH 206.

== FM 570 ==
Farm to Market Road 570
- Location: Eastland
- Length: 11.395 mi (18.338 km)
- Existed: July 23, 1945–present

Farm to Market Road 570 (FM 570) is located in Eastland County. It runs from I-20 east of Eastland to FM 571 east of Cheney.

FM 570 was designated on July 23, 1945, from US 80 (now I-20), 1.5 miles (2.4 km) east of Eastland, to the Ranger/Staff Road. On December 17, 1952, the road was extended east 7.2 miles (11.6 km) to FM 571. This extension was removed altogether on February 24, 1954, due to construction of a lake, but was added back seven months later.

== FM 571 ==
Farm to Market Road 571
- Location: Eastland County
- Length: 19.202 mi (30.903 km)
- Existed: July 23, 1945–present

Farm to Market Road 571 (FM 571) is located in Eastland County. It runs from Loop 254 in Ranger to FM 8 northeast of Gorman.

FM 571 was designated on July 23, 1945, from US 80 (now Loop 254) at Ranger south to the Eastland/Chaney Road. On November 23, 1948, a 2.0-mile (3.2 km) section from north of FM 8 to FM 8 was added, creating a gap. On May 23, 1951, the road was extended 4 miles (6.4 km) from 2 miles (3.2 km) north of FM 8 to a road intersection. On November 20, 1951, the road was extended 3.4 miles (5.5 km) north to another road intersection. On December 17, 1952, the road was extended 3.2 miles (5.1 km) to close the gap.

== FM 572 ==
Farm to Market Road 572
- Location: Mills County
- Length: 17.792 mi (28.633 km)
- Existed: July 23, 1945–present

Farm to Market Road 572 (FM 572) is located in Mills County. It runs from CR 305 in Goldthwaite to FM 1047 near Moline.

FM 572 was designated on July 23, 1945, from Goldthwaite to an intersection with North/South Road. The road was extended southeast three times: 3.5 miles (5.6 km) to a road intersection on July 15, 1949; 4.5 miles (7.2 km) to another road intersection on January 21, 1956; and 3.2 miles (5.1 km) to FM 1047 on October 31, 1957.

== FM 573 ==
Farm to Market Road 573
- Location: Comanche and Mills counties
- Length: 32.796 mi (52.780 km)
- Existed: July 23, 1945–present

Farm to Market Road 573 (FM 573) is located in Comanche and Mills counties. It runs from FM 590 south of Comanche to FM 574 at Ridge. The route has an overlap with US 84/US 183 in Mullin.

FM 573 was designated on July 23, 1945, from US 84 (now US 84/US 183) at Mullin to West Road (south of Democrat). On December 17, 1952, the road was extended 4.1 miles (6.6 km) north to FM 1642 (now FM 218) at Democrat. On October 28, 1953, the road was extended 4.2 miles (6.8 km) southwest from US 84, creating a concurrency with US 84. On July 28, 1955, the road was extended north 8 miles (13 km) to a road intersection. On November 24, 1959, the road was extended 5 miles (8.0 km) north to FM 590. On September 20, 1961, the road was extended southwest 6.1 miles (9.8 km) to FM 574.

== FM 574 ==
Farm to Market Road 574
- Location: Mills County
- Length: 23.227 mi (37.380 km)
- Existed: July 23, 1945–present

Farm to Market Road 574 (FM 574) is located in Mills County. It runs from US 183/SH 16 in Goldthwaite to FM 45.

FM 574 was designated on July 23, 1945, from SH 16 and SH 284 (now US 183) to a point 5 miles (8.0 km) west. Four months later the route was extended west 4.6 miles (7.4 km). On July 15, 1949, the road was extended west 2 miles (3.2 km). On October 28, 1953, the road was extended west 3.3 miles (5.3 km) to a road intersection. On October 31, 1958, the road was extended west 11 miles (18 km) to FM 45.

== FM 575 ==
Farm to Market Road 575
- Location: Mills County
- Length: 10.933 mi (17.595 km)
- Existed: July 23, 1945–present

Farm to Market Road 575 (FM 575) is located in Mills County. It runs from FM 2005 northeast of Goldthwaithe to a point 6 miles (9.7 km) north of Caradan.

FM 575 was designated on July 23, 1945, from US 84, 1 mile (1.6 km) east of Goldthwaite, northeast to a road intersection 4 miles (6.4 km) southwest of Caradan. On November 23, 1948, the road was extended 4.4 miles (7.1 km) to Caradan. On April 13, 1959, a 4.7-mile (7.6 km) section from US 84 to then-FM 2005 was transferred to FM 2005. On June 28, 1963, the road was extended north 6 miles (9.7 km) from Caradan.

== FM 576 ==
Farm to Market Road 576
- Location: Shackelford and Stephens counties
- Length: 40.231 mi (64.746 km)
- Existed: July 21, 1945–present

Farm to Market Road 576 (FM 576) is located in Shackelford and Stephens counties. It runs from US 283 south of Albany via Moran to FM 207.

FM 576 as designated on July 21, 1945, from SH 67 (corrected to SH 6), 5.5 miles (8.9 km) south of Breckenridge, to Eolian. On May 23, 1951, the road was extended west 5.3 miles (8.5 km) from Eolian to a road intersection. On August 29, 1951, the road was extended 3.8 miles (6.1 km) east from SH 6 to a road intersection, replacing FM 1646 and creating a concurrency with SH 6. On December 18, 1951, the road was modified to end at the Shackelford/Stephens County Line, an increase of 0.3 miles (0.48 km). On January 14, 1952, the road was extended southwest 14.2 miles (22.9 km) to a road intersection, replacing FM 1232 and FM 1900. On October 29, 1953, the road was extended 4 miles (6.4 km) west. On September 29, 1954, the road was extended 2.6 miles (4.2 km) to US 283. On April 30, 1987, a 3.4-mile (5.5 km) section from FM 1852 to FM 207 was added.

== FM 577 ==
Farm to Market Road 577
- Location: Washington County
- Length: 5.221 mi (8.402 km)
- Existed: October 31, 1957–present

Farm to Market Road 577 (FM 577) is located in Washington County. It runs from SH 36 in the northwestern part of Brenham, east and southeast to US 290 in the southeastern part of the city, forming a partial loop. It is known locally as Gun and Rod Road and Blue Bell Road. Blue Bell Creameries is located on this road.

FM 577 was designated on October 31, 1957, from SH 36 (now Bus. SH 36) at Horton Street east to SH 90 (now SH 105). On June 28, 1963, the road was extended southeast to US 290. On July 25, 1993, the road was extended west to the current location of SH 36.

=== FM 577 (1945) ===
Farm to Market Road 577
- Location: Stephens County
- Existed: July 21, 1945–March 27, 1957

A previous route numbered FM 577 was designated in Stephens County on July 21, 1945, from US 180, 4 miles (6.4 km) east of Breckenridge, southeast 8.5 miles (13.7 km) to Necessity. On November 23, 1948, the road was extended southeast 2.7 miles (4.3 km), then southeast and east another 2.4 miles (3.9 km) on July 15, 1949, and east 3.6 miles (5.8 km) to FM 717 on September 15, 1955. FM 577 was cancelled on March 27, 1957, and transferred to FM 207.

== FM 578 ==
Farm to Market Road 578
- Location: Young and Stephens counties
- Length: 31.303 mi (50.377 km)
- Existed: July 21, 1945–present

Farm to Market Road 578 (FM 578) is located in Young and Stephens counties. It runs from SH 79 near the Brazos River to US 183 north of Breckenridge.

FM 578 was designated on July 21, 1945, from SH 6 (now US 183), 5.5 miles (8.9 km) north of Breckenridge, north to Crystal Falls. On December 17, 1952, the road was extended 0.9 miles (1.4 km) to a road intersection. On December 10, 1953, the road was extended 7.8 miles (12.6 km) to FM 209, replacing FM 2076. On September 29, 1954, a 9.5-mile (15.3 km) section from SH 24 (now US 380) to FM 209 was added, creating a concurrency with FM 209. On October 31, 1958, the road was extended north 7 miles (11 km) to SH 79, creating a concurrency with SH 24. On January 18, 1960, the road was extended south 2.1 miles (3.4 km) along old US 183 to US 183.

== FM 579 ==
Farm to Market Road 579
- Location: Leon and Madison counties
- Length: 3.794 mi (6.106 km)
- Existed: September 26, 1979–present

Farm to Market Road 579 (FM 579) is a designation that has been used three times. The current use dates from 1979 in Leon County.

FM 579 was designated on September 26, 1979, from FM 1119, 2.5 miles (4.0 km) southeast of FM 977, south to the Madison County line. On October 21, 1981, the road was extended south to SH OSR.

=== FM 579 (1945–1947) ===
Farm to Market Road 579
- Location: Stephens County
- Existed: July 21, 1945–August 1, 1947

The first use of the FM 579 designation was in Stephens County, from SH 67, 9 miles (14 km) south of Breckenridge, east 4.5 miles (7.2 km) to the Wayland/Necessity Road. FM 579 was cancelled on August 1, 1947, due to the creation of a new portion of FM 701.

=== FM 579 (1951–1968) ===
Farm to Market Road 579
- Location: Hale and Floyd counties
- Length: 3.794 mi (6.106 km)
- Existed: May 23, 1951–September 19, 1968

The second use of the FM 579 designation was in Floyd County on May 23, 1951, from US 62, 3 miles (4.8 km) south of Floydada, west 4.1 miles (6.6 km) to a road intersection. On November 20, 1951, the road was extended west to FM 784 (now FM 378). A portion from FM 789 east to FM 378 was added on December 21, 1959, replacing a portion of FM 784 and creating a concurrency at FM 378. A section from FM 400 east to FM 789 was added on July 11, 1968, creating a concurrency at FM 789. FM 579 was cancelled on September 19, 1968, and became a portion of FM 37.

== FM 580 ==
Farm to Market Road 580
- Location: San Saba, Lampasas, and Coryell counties
- Length: 62.240 mi (100.166 km)
- Existed: July 11, 1945–present

Farm to Market Road 580 (FM 580) is located in San Saba, Lampasas, and Coryell counties. It runs from US 190 east of San Saba to FM 116 southwest of Pidcoke.

FM 580 was designated on July 11, 1945, from US 190 in Lampasas west to Ogles Road (3 miles (4.8 km) east of Nix). On November 23, 1948, the road was extended 3.2 miles (5.1 km) to Nix. On May 23, 1951, the road was extended west 3.2 miles (5.1 km) to a road intersection. On November 20, 1951, the road was extended northwest 23 miles (37 km) to US 190, 3.5 miles (5.6 km) east of San Saba, replacing FM 499. On March 27, 1957, the road was extended northeast 16.3 miles (26.2 km) to FM 1113 at Topsey, replacing FM 582 (this did not become effective until the 1957 travel map was released). On November 24, 1959, the road was extended northeast 6 miles (9.7 km) to FM 116. On May 1, 1965, the road was rerouted in Lampasas, shortening the route by 0.5 miles (0.80 km).

== FM 581 ==
Farm to Market Road 581
- Location: Lampasas County
- Length: 31.608 mi (50.868 km)
- Existed: July 14, 1945–present

Farm to Market Road 581 (FM 581) is located in Lampasas County. It runs from FM 580 to FM 1690. The route has an overlap with US 281 in Adamsville.

FM 581 was designated on July 14, 1945, from SH 284 (now US 183) in Lometa to a point 3 miles (4.8 km) southwest of Atherton School. On April 1, 1948, the road was extended northeast 3 miles (4.8 km) to Atherton School. On December 17, 1952, the road was extended 7.6 miles (12.2 km) to US 281 near Adamsville. On July 28, 1955, the road was extended southwest 9.2 miles (14.8 km) to FM 580, replacing FM 1495. On November 21, 1956, the road was extended southeast 4.6 miles (7.4 km) to FM 1690, creating a concurrency with US 281.

== FM 582 ==
Farm to Market Road 582
- Location: Zavala County
- Length: 12.747 mi (20.514 km)
- Existed: October 31, 1958–present

Farm to Market Road 582 (FM 582) is located in Zavala County. It runs from FM 65 in Crystal City to FM 395. FM 582 is known locally as Lake Street, South 7th Avenue and Rock Quarry Road in Crystal City.

FM 582 was designated on October 31, 1958, from FM 65 at Crystal City east to FM 395 as a replacement of a section of FM 395 (which was rerouted on a new road to the south). On May 20, 1961, the road was extended east, north and west to FM 395. On August 1, 1962, when a section of FM 582 between FM 65 and FM 1433 was relocated to follow Lake Street, creating a concurrency with FM 1433.

=== FM 582 (1945) ===
Farm to Market Road 582
- Location: Lampasas and Coryell counties
- Existed: July 14, 1945–March 27, 1957

A previous route numbered FM 582 was designated on July 14, 1945, from US 190 in Lampasas northeast 8.0 miles (12.9 km) to the Copperas Cove Road. On November 23, 1948, the road was extended northeast 4.8 miles (7.7 km) to Rumley. On July 15, 1949, the road was extended northeast 5.0 miles (8.0 km) to a road intersection near the Coryell County line. On October 26, 1954, the road was extended 1.6 miles (2.6 km) northeast to FM 1113 at Topsey. FM 582 was cancelled on March 27, 1957, and transferred to FM 580, although this did not become effective until the 1957 travel map was released.

== FM 583 ==
Farm to Market Road 583
- Location: Brown and Eastland counties
- Length: 12.847 mi (20.675 km)
- Existed: July 16, 1945–present

Farm to Market Road 583 (FM 583) is located in Brown and Eastland counties. From its southern terminus at US 183 north of May, it runs west to Williams, then turns north to its northern terminus at SH 36 east of Pioneer.

FM 583 was designated on July 16, 1945, from US 283 (now US 183), 1.5 miles (2.4 km) north of May, to Williams. On May 23, 1951, the road was extended 2.1 miles (3.4 km) north and west to a road intersection. It was extended 4.5 miles (7.2 km) to SH 36 on November 20 of that year.

== RM 584 ==
Ranch to Market Road 584
- Location: Tom Green County
- Length: 13.325 mi (21.445 km)
- Existed: November 24, 1959–present

Ranch to Market Road 584 (RM 584) is located in Tom Green County.

RM 584 begins at an intersection with US 277 south of San Angelo. The highway runs west for approximately a mile before turning northwest. RM 584 passes near San Angelo Regional Airport before crossing Lake Nasworthy and entering the city limits of San Angelo. In San Angelo, RM 584 is known locally as Knickerbocker Road and runs through the city's south side. Between Lake Nasworthy and Loop 306, the highway runs by many subdivisions before passing a major retail center just north of Loop 306. North of Loop 306, RM 584 runs just south of Angelo State University before ending at an intersection with US 87/US 277.

The highway was designated on November 24, 1959, running from Loop 306 northeast to Avenue N in San Angelo. On June 28, 1963, the highway was extended southwest 4.9 miles (7.9 km). On November 26, 1969, RM 584's northern terminus was relocated from Avenue N to US 87 along Avenue Q and Knickerbocker Road. On May 25, 1976, the highway was extended southwestward and southeastward to US 277. On June 27, 1995, the section of RM 584 from County Road 225 to US 87/US 277 was transferred to Urban Road 584 (UR 584). The designation reverted to RM 584 with the elimination of the Urban Road system on November 15, 2018.

Junction list

The entire route is in Tom Green County.

Location	mi	km	Destinations	Notes
	0.0	0.0	US 277 – San Angelo, Christoval	
San Angelo	11.0	17.7	Loop 306	
San Angelo	13.5	21.7	US 87 / US 277 (Bryant Boulevard)	
1.000 mi = 1.609 km; 1.000 km = 0.621 mi

=== FM 584 (1945-1951) ===
Farm to Market Road 584
- Location: Brown County
- Existed: July 16, 1945–December 12, 1951

The original FM 584 was designated on July 16, 1945 from US 84 in Zephyr northeast 3.5 miles (5.6 km) to a road near Dry Blanket Creek in Brown County. On May 23, 1951 the road was extended northeast 4.9 miles (7.9 km) to the Comanche County line. FM 584 was cancelled on December 12, 1951 and became a portion of FM 590.

== FM 585 ==
Farm to Market Road 585
- Location: Coleman and Brown counties
- Length: 30.860 mi (49.664 km)
- Existed: July 16, 1945–present

Farm to Market Road 585 (FM 585) is located in Brown and Coleman counties.

FM 585 begins at an intersection with US 67 / US 84 approximately 1.7 miles (2.7 km) west of Bangs. The roadway travels to the north through unincorporated Brown County, intersecting FM 2492 west of Thrifty and FM 1850 west of Grosvenor. FM 585 then curves to the west and enters Coleman County before reaching its terminus at SH 206 near the community of Echo between Coleman and Burkett.

FM 585 was designated on July 16, 1945. The highway originally ran from its junction with US 84 northward approximately 6.5 miles (10.5 km) to the road connecting the communities of Thrifty and Fry (present-day FM 2492). On October 26, 1954, the roadway was extended north to the intersection with FM 1850. The route reached its current length on May 24, 1962, when it was extended northward and westward to connect with SH 206, replacing FM 2560.

Junction list

County	Location	mi	km	Destinations	Notes
Brown		0.0	0.0	US 67 / US 84 – Coleman, Bangs	Southern terminus
Brown		6.2	10.0	FM 2492	
Brown		11.0	17.7	FM 1850	
Coleman		22.6	36.4	SH 206 – Coleman, Burkett	Northern terminus
1.000 mi = 1.609 km; 1.000 km = 0.621 mi

== FM 586 ==
Farm to Market Road 586
- Location: Brown and Mills counties
- Length: 33.423 mi (53.789 km)
- Existed: July 16, 1945–present

Farm to Market Road 586 (FM 586) is located in Brown and Mills counties. It runs from US 67 in Bangs to FM 45 with a spur connection in Bangs to US 67. The route has an overlap with US 377 in Dulin.

FM 586 was designated on July 16, 1945, from US 281 (now US 377) at Dulin (16 miles (26 km) southwest of Brownwood) via Brooksmith to the East and West Road. On June 16, 1949, the road was extended to US 67/US 84 in Bangs, replacing FM 1122. On October 31, 1958, a 1.2-mile (1.9 km) spur connection in Bangs to US 67 was added. On August 1, 1963, the road was extended 12.5 miles (20.1 km) to FM 45, creating a concurrency with US 377.

== FM 587 ==
Farm to Market Road 587
- Location: Eastland and Comanche counties
- Length: 21.700 mi (34.923 km)
- Existed: July 13, 1945–present

Farm to Market Road 587 (FM 587) is located in Eastland and Comanche counties. It runs from SH 36 at Chuckville Community to SH 16 in De Leon.

FM 587 was designated on July 13, 1945, from SH 16 in De Leon to the Duster/Beattie Road near Duster. On November 23, 1948, a 6.4-mile (10.3 km) section from Sipe Springs to near Duster was added. On October 28, 1953, the road was extended west 6.2 miles (10.0 km) to FM 1027 at Chuckville. On April 23, 1958, the road was extended 0.8 miles (1.3 km) to SH 36, replacing a section of FM 1027.

== FM 588 ==
Farm to Market Road 588
- Location: Comanche County
- Length: 7.279 mi (11.714 km)
- Existed: July 13, 1945–present

Farm to Market Road 588 (FM 588) is located in Comanche County. It runs from SH 36 northwest of Comanche via Beattie to FM 2247.

FM 588 was designated on July 13, 1945, from SH 36, 8.5 miles (13.7 km) northwest of Comanche, to the southern edge of Beattie. On July 28, 1955, the road was extended east and north 7.3 miles (11.7 km) to FM 587. On November 21, 1956, the road was extended north 7.5 miles (12.1 km) to SH 6 (now FM 8) at Gorman, creating a concurrency with FM 587. On April 23, 1958, the section from FM 587 to FM 2247 was transferred to FM 2247 (this section remained signed as FM 588 until 1959) and the section from FM 587 to FM 8 was renumbered FM 679, shortening the route by more than half.

== FM 589 ==
Farm to Market Road 589
- Location: Comanche County
- Length: 4.292 mi (6.907 km)
- Existed: July 13, 1945–present

Farm to Market Road 589 (FM 589) is located in Comanche County. It runs from FM 1689 at Sidney to SH 36 northwest of Comanche.

FM 589 was designated on July 13, 1945, from SH 36, 5.5 miles (8.9 km) northwest of Comanche, to the northern edge of Sidney. On December 17, 1952, the road was extended northwest 5.2 miles (8.4 km) to a county road. On October 28, 1953, the road was extended northwest to the Brown County line, but that extension, as well as the 1952 extension, was transferred to FM 1689 on December 11 of that year.

== FM 590 ==
Farm to Market Road 590
- Location: Comanche and Brown counties
- Length: 21.025 mi (33.836 km)
- Existed: July 13, 1945–present

Farm to Market Road 590 (FM 590) is located in Comanche and Brown counties. It runs from US 84 in Zephyr to SH 16 in Comanche.

FM 590 was designated on July 13, 1945, from SH 16 near the southern edge of Comanche to Blanket Road (4.5 miles (7.2 km) north of Mercer's Store). On November 23, 1948, the road was extended southwest 4 miles (6.4 km) to Mercer's Gap. On December 18, 1951 (connecting section designated November 20), the road was extended 12.6 miles (20.3 km) to US 84 in Zephyr, replacing FM 584.

== FM 591 ==
Farm to Market Road 591
- Location: Comanche County
- Length: 4.765 mi (7.669 km)
- Existed: July 13, 1945–present

Farm to Market Road 591 (FM 591) is located in Comanche County. It runs from FM 1476 near Baggett Creek Church to FM 1702.

FM 591 was designated on July 13, 1945, from US 67 on the northern edge of Proctor to the Proctor/Wilson Road. On November 23, 1948, the road was extended south 1.7 miles (2.7 km). On December 12, 1951, the road was extended southeast 11.4 miles (18.3 km) to SH 36 east of Gustine, replacing FM 1767. On September 9, 1954, the road was extended southwest 6.5 miles (10.5 km) to Energy. On October 31, 1958, the road was extended 7.6 miles (12.2 km) to FM 218 at Indian Gap, replacing FM 2309. On January 15, 1960, the section from FM 1476 to US 67 was transferred to FM 1476 and the section from FM 1702 to FM 218 was transferred to FM 1702.

== FM 592 ==
Farm to Market Road 592
- Location: Wheeler County
- Length: 30.097 mi (48.436 km)
- Existed: July 9, 1945–present

Farm to Market Road 592 (FM 592) is located in Wheeler County. It runs from CR 15 west of Wheeler to FM 1046 near Allison.

FM 592 was designated on July 9, 1945, from US 83 at Twitty via Kelton to SH 152. On October 29, 1953, the road was extended 3 miles (4.8 km) west and north to a road intersection. On September 21, 1955, an 11.4-mile (18.3 km) section from FM 1046 to SH 152 was added.

== FM 593 ==
Farm to Market Road 593
- Location: Upshur County
- Length: 7.009 mi (11.280 km)
- Existed: July 13, 1945–present

Farm to Market Road 593 (FM 593) is located in Upshur County. It runs from US 271 at Midway via Ewell to FM 2796.

FM 593 was designated on July 13, 1945, from US 271 at Midway to a point 1.2 miles (1.9 km) east of Ewell. On July 16, 1949, the road was extended 4.6 miles (7.4 km) to Cox. On December 17, 1952, the road was extended southwest 3.9 miles (6.3 km) to SH 155. On August 6, 1965, the section from FM 2796 to SH 155 was transferred to FM 2796, but was not signed as FM 2796 until 1967.

== FM 594 ==
Farm to Market Road 594
- Location: Washington County
- Length: 2.623 mi (4.221 km)
- Existed: September 26, 1979–present

Farm to Market Road 594 (FM 594) is a designation that has been used four times. The current use is in Washington County, from FM 1948 northwest to Flat Prairie.

=== FM 594 (1945–1964) ===
Farm to Market Road 594
- Location: Hale County
- Existed: July 9, 1945–August 20, 1964

The first use of FM 594 was in Hale County on July 9, 1945, from FM 54, 8 miles (13 km) west of US 87, northward 7.5 miles (12.1 km) to Cotton Center. A portion from US 70, 2 miles (3.2 km) west of Halfway southward 9.0 miles (14.5 km) to a road intersection was added on April 4, 1949, replacing FM 1069 and creating a gap. This gap was closed on November 20, 1951. FM 594 was cancelled on August 20, 1964, and transferred to FM 179.

=== FM 594 (1968) ===
Farm to Market Road 594
- Location: Floyd County
- Existed: July 11, 1968–October 29, 1968

The next use of the FM 594 designation was in Floyd County, from US 70 in Floydada east 0.9 miles (1.4 km) along Price Street to SH 207. This second use was short-lived as FM 594 became a portion of FM 784 just three months later, though this FM 594 was not cancelled until it was built.

=== FM 594 (1972–1978) ===
Farm to Market Road 594
- Location: Bell County
- Existed: November 3, 1972–October 11, 1978

The third use of the FM 594 designation was in Bell County, from US 190, 1 mile (1.6 km) west of I-35, south and east two miles to I-35 at Loop 121. FM 594 was cancelled on October 11, 1978, and became a portion of Loop 121.

== FM 595 ==
Farm to Market Road 595
- Location: Cochran County
- Length: 12.352 mi (19.879 km)
- Existed: July 9, 1945–present

Farm to Market Road 595 (FM 595) is located in Cochran County. It runs from SH 125 in Bledsoe to CR 25.

FM 595 was designated on July 9, 1945, from FM 769 (now SH 125) in Bledsoe to SH 290 (later SH 116, now SH 114). On July 14, 1949, the road was extended north 2.7 miles (4.3 km) to a road intersection.

== FM 596 ==
Farm to Market Road 596
- Location: Bailey and Cochran counties
- Length: 8.018 mi (12.904 km)
- Existed: July 9, 1945–present

Farm to Market Road 596 (FM 596) is located in Bailey and Cochran counties. It runs from FM 54 north of Maple to SH 114 west of Morton.

FM 596 was designated on July 9, 1945, from SH 290 (later SH 116, now SH 114), 8.5 miles (13.7 km) west of Morton, to the Bailey County line. On January 18, 1946, the road was extended to Maple. On July 14, 1949, a 1-mile (1.6 km) section from FM 54 to Maple was added.

== FM 597 ==
Farm to Market Road 597
- Location: Cochran, Hockley, and Lubbock counties
- Length: 65.999 mi (106.215 km)
- Existed: July 9, 1945–present

Farm to Market Road 597 (FM 597) is located in Cochran, Hockley, and Lubbock counties. It runs from SH 214 north of Morton to FM 400 northwest of Becton. The route has overlaps with FM 303 near Pep and SH 51 north of Whitharral.

FM 597 was designated on July 9, 1945, from SH 214, 1 mile (1.6 km) north of Morton, to a point 4 miles (6.4 km) east. On April 1, 1948, the road was extended east 6.5 miles (10.5 km) to the Hockley County line. On November 1, 1954, the road was extended east 52.5 miles (84.5 km) to a road intersection in Lubbock County, replacing a portion of FM 1490, all of FM 1938, FM 1175 and FM 2105 and creating concurrencies with FM 2129 (now FM 303) and SH 51. On November 21, 1956, the road was extended east 3.7 miles (6.0 km) to FM 400.

== FM 598 ==
Farm to Market Road 598
- Location: Kaufman County
- Length: 2.600 mi (4.184 km)
- Existed: October 26, 1983–present

Farm to Market Road 598 (FM 598) is located in Kaufman County. It runs from FM 1392 southeast to SH 205 in Terrell. It was not opened until around 2011.

=== FM 598 (1945) ===
Farm to Market Road 598
- Location: Briscoe and Floyd counties
- Existed: July 21, 1945–December 21, 1959

A previous route numbered FM 598 was designated on July 21, 1945, from SH 86, 7 miles (11 km) west of Silverton, south 6.0 miles (9.7 km). On May 7, 1948, an 11.3 miles (18.2 km) mile section from Lockney north to Lone Star School was added, creating a gap. The northern portion was extended south 2.0 miles (3.2 km) on July 14, 1949, and the gap was closed on December 17, 1952. On October 31, 1958, the road was extended to Loop 75 in Lockney. FM 598 was cancelled on December 21, 1959, and transferred to FM 378.

== FM 599 ==
Farm to Market Road 599
- Location: Briscoe and Motley counties
- Length: 11.695 mi (18.821 km)
- Existed: July 21, 1945–present

Farm to Market Road 599 (FM 599) is located in Briscoe and Motley counties. It runs from SH 86 east of Quitaque to FM 97 in Flomot.

FM 599 was designated on July 21, 1945, from SH 86 east of Quitaque to Gasoline. On March 29, 1949, the road was extended south 3.2 miles (5.1 km) to the Motley County line. On January 3, 1952, the road was extended south 6.1 miles (9.8 km) to FM 97 at Flomot, replacing FM 194.
