= Blacklands =

Blacklands or Blackland may refer to:

== Places ==
=== In Texas ===
- Blackland, Austin, Texas, a neighborhood in Austin
- Blackland, Texas, a town in Rockwall County
- Blackland Army Airfield, a former name of Waco Regional Airport
- Texas Blackland Prairies, an ecoregion

=== Elsewhere ===
- Blackland, Charlotte County, New Brunswick, Canada
- Blackland, Mississippi, an unincorporated community in Prentiss County
- Blackland, Restigouche County, New Brunswick, Canada
- Blacklands (archaeological site), a Roman site in the parish of King's Sutton, Northamptonshire, England
- Blacklands, Ayrshire, an area of Kilwinning, Ayrshire, Scotland
- Blacklands, County Tyrone, a townland in County Tyrone, Northern Ireland
- Blacklands, East Sussex, a suburban area in the town of Hastings, East Sussex, England
- Blackland, Wiltshire, a hamlet and former parish

== Music ==
- Blackland Records
- Blacklands (album), the second and final album from Music for Pleasure, released in 1985

== See also ==
- Black earth (disambiguation)
- Blacklands Railroad
- The Barsac Mission
- Mordor (disambiguation)
