= Texas State Highway 205 =

Highway in Texas

State Highway 205
- SH 205, highlighted in red

Route information
- Maintained by TxDOT
- Length: 23.278 mi (37.462 km)
- Existed: by 1934–present

Major junctions
- South end: US 80 / FM 148 in Terrell
- I-30 in Rockwall
- North end: SH 78 in Lavon

Location
- Country: United States
- State: Texas

Highway system
- Highways in Texas; Interstate; US; State; Former; Toll; Loops; Spurs; FM/RM; Park; Rec
← SH 204	→ SH 206

State Highway 205 (SH 205) is a Texas state highway that runs from US 80/FM 148 in Terrell, traveling through Rockwall before ending at SH 78 in Lavon.

== Route description ==
SH 205 begins at a junction with US 80 and FM 148 in Terrell. It heads northwest from this junction to an intersection with FM 1392. The highway continues to the northwest to an intersection with FM 548. Heading towards the northwest, the highway continues to a junction with FM 550 in McLendon-Chisholm. The highway continues to the northwest to an intersection with FM 549 in Rockwall. It continues to the northwest through Rockwall to a junction with SH 276. As the highway continues to the northwest through Rockwall, it intersects I-30. It turns towards the north from this junction to an intersection with FM 740. The highway continues to the north through Rockwall along Goliad Street. Near the town square, SH 205 runs along a pair of one-way streets with northbound traffic traveling on Goliad Street and southbound on Alamo Road, intersecting SH 66 in downtown. Leaving the downtown Rockwall area, the highway becomes a two-way road again. Heading towards the north, the highway continues to a junction with FM 552 before leaving Rockwall. SH 205 reaches its northern terminus at SH 78 in Lavon.

== History ==
This route was designated on May 15, 1934, from Terrell to Rockwall, and was extended north to Lavon on September 1, 1939. The route has been under heavy construction since 2006 as part of a new expansion and widening project, and was scheduled to be completed in 2011.

The highway has a bypass road as well, John King Boulevard, that bypasses Rockwall, running a few miles east of SH 205. Planning for a bypass around Rockwall began in the early 2000s and opened to traffic on August 3, 2012.

== Junction list ==
County	Location	mi	km	Destinations	Notes
Kaufman	Terrell	0.0	0.0	US 80 / FM 148 south – Terrell, Dallas, Crandall	Road continues south as FM 148
Kaufman		3.9	6.3	FM 1392 south – Lawrence	
Rockwall		6.6	10.6	FM 548 south – Forney	South end of FM 548 overlap
Rockwall		7.1	11.4	FM 548 north – Royse City	North end of FM 548 overlap
Rockwall	McLendon-Chisholm	9.5	15.3	FM 550 – Heath, Blackland	
Rockwall	Rockwall	12.5	20.1	FM 549 south – Heath	South end of FM 549 overlap
Rockwall	Rockwall	12.7	20.4	FM 549 north – Fate	North end of FM 549 overlap
Rockwall	Rockwall	14.4	23.2	SH 276 east – Quinlan	
Rockwall	Rockwall	15.1	24.3	I-30 (US 67) – Greenville, Dallas	I-30 exit 68
Rockwall	Rockwall	16.1	25.9	FM 740 south (Ridge Road) / Emma Jane Street	
Rockwall	Rockwall	16.8	27.0	SH 66 east (Washington Street)	
Rockwall	Rockwall	16.9	27.2	SH 66 west (Rusk Street)	
Rockwall	Rockwall	19.3	31.1	FM 552 east / Dalton Road – Royse City	
Collin	Lavon	23.3	37.5	SH 78 – Wylie, Farmersville	
1.000 mi = 1.609 km; 1.000 km = 0.621 mi: Concurrency terminus
