= Farm to Market Road 331 =

Highway in Texas, United States

Farm to Market Road 331

Route information
- Maintained by TxDOT
- Length: 11.685 mi (Note: The certified length given is shorter than the actual mileage, as the TxDOT description of FM 331 considers it to be discontinuous at FM 529.) (18.805 km)
- Existed: 1945–present

Major junctions
- South end: SH 36 north of Sealy
- FM 529
- North end: Oil Field Rd. near Raccoon Bend

Location
- Country: United States
- State: Texas
- Counties: Austin

Highway system
- Highways in Texas; Interstate; US; State; Former; Toll; Loops; Spurs; FM/RM; Park; Rec
← FM 330	→ FM 332

Farm to Market Road 331 (FM 331) is a farm to market road in eastern Austin County, Texas.

== Route description ==
FM 331 begins at an intersection with SH 36 north of Sealy. The route travels to the north into the small community of Burleigh, where it has a brief concurrency with FM 529. It continues northward, roughly paralleling the Brazos River to its east, before state maintenance ends at Oil Field Road near the community of Raccoon Bend. Oil Field Road continues into the town and provides access to SH 159.

== History ==
FM 331 was originally designated along a 7-mile (11 km) stretch from SH 159 in Bellville to Burleigh on June 16, 1945. On October 31, 1958, the highway was extended southward 6.3 miles (10.1 km) from Burleigh to SH 36 southeast of Peters. The highway was rerouted on April 6, 1970, when the original section from Bellville to Burleigh was redesignated as part of FM 529; the section north of Burleigh to Raccoon Bend, which was formerly FM 2916, was also added to the route.

== Major intersections ==
The entire route is in Austin County.

Location	mi	km	Destinations	Notes
	0.0	0.0	SH 36 – Bellville, Sealy	Southern terminus
Burleigh	5.9	9.5	FM 529 west – Bellville	South end of FM 529 concurrency
	6.3	10.1	FM 529 east	North end of FM 529 concurrency
	12.1	19.5	Oil Field Rd.	Northern terminus; state maintenance ends
1.000 mi = 1.609 km; 1.000 km = 0.621 mi

== Gallery ==
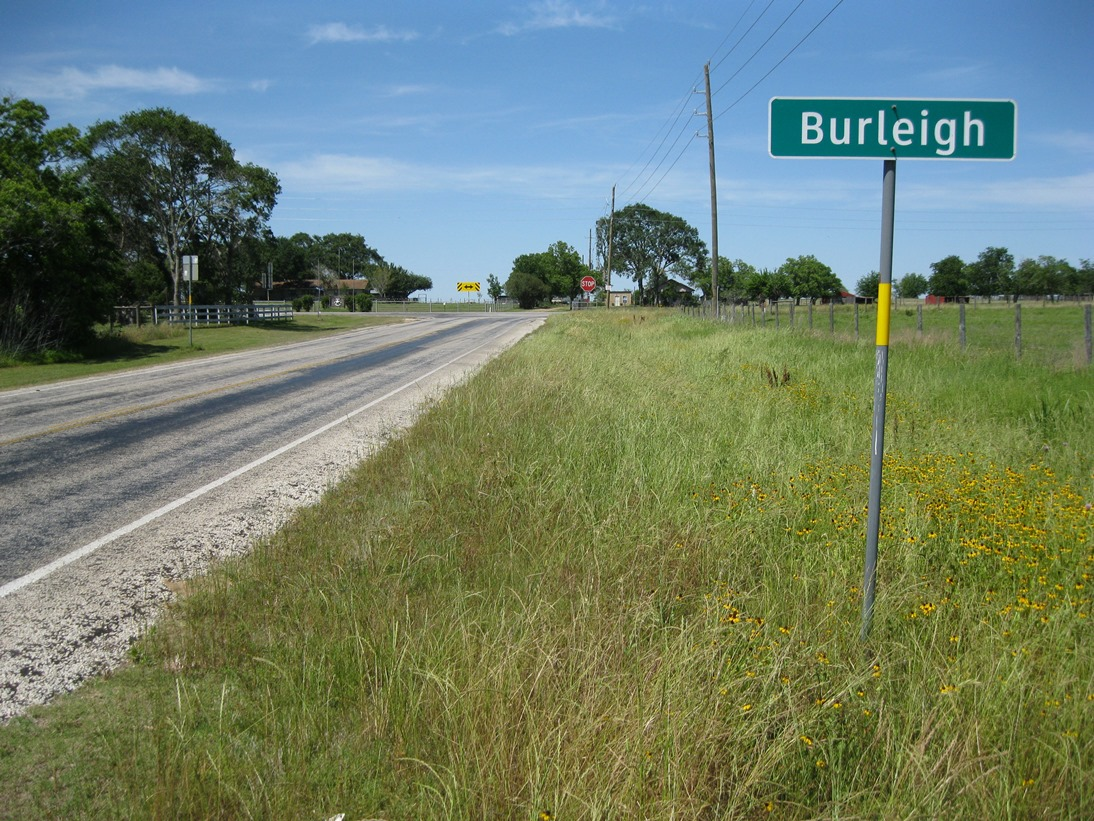
Sign for Burleigh on FM 331 north near FM 529

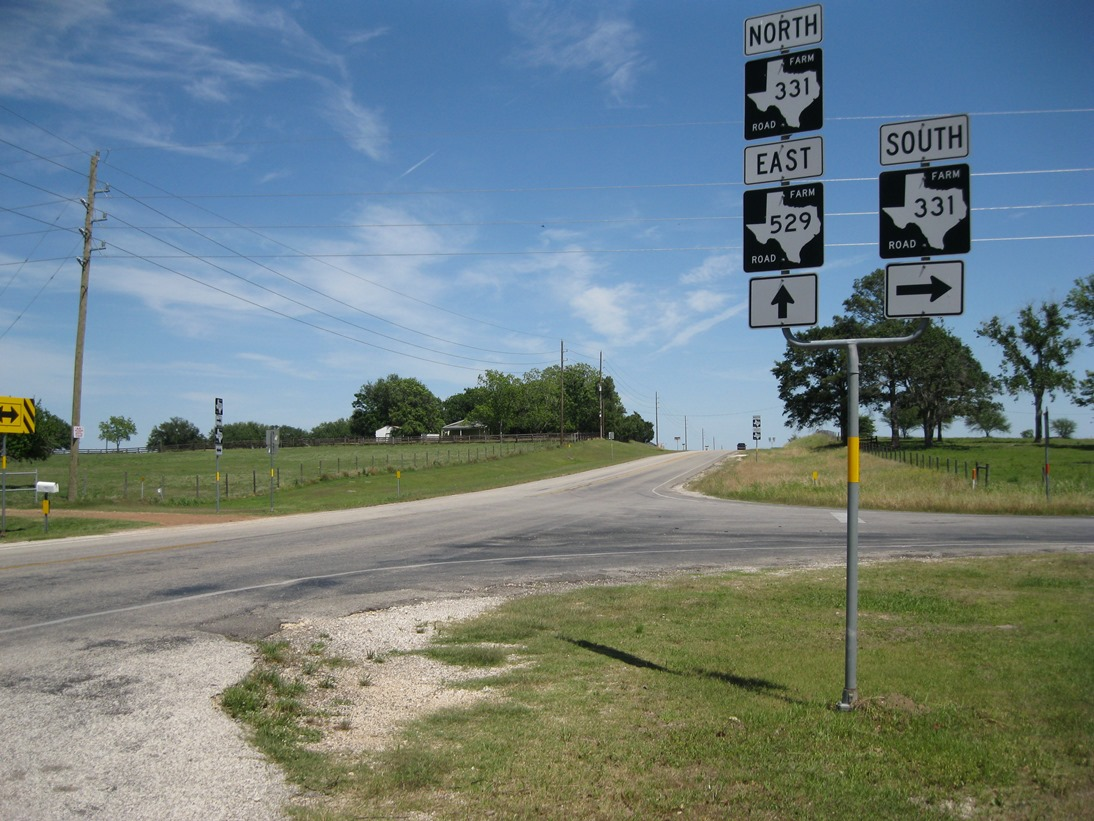
FM 331 at the south end of the FM 529 concurrency
