= Texas State Highway 276 =

State highway in Texas

State Highway 276
- SH 276 highlighted in red, SH 276 Bus. highlighted in blue

Route information
- Maintained by TxDOT
- Length: 41.2 mi (66.3 km)
- Existed: 1960–present

Major junctions
- West end: SH 205 in Rockwall
- East end: US 69 in Emory

Location
- Country: United States
- State: Texas
- Counties: Rockwall, Hunt, Rains

Highway system
- Highways in Texas; Interstate; US; State; Former; Toll; Loops; Spurs; FM/RM; Park; Rec
← SH 275	→ US 277

State Highway 276 (SH 276) is a Texas state highway that runs from Rockwall east to Emory. This route was designated on July 25, 1960, between Rockwall and Quinlan, replacing FM 1143 and part of FM 35. SH 276 was extended to its current terminus on October 25, 1990, replacing most of FM 35.

== History ==
SH 276 was first designated on September 7, 1938, as a route between US 285 southeast of Arno and Mentone. On April 16, 1946, another section from SH 115 to what was then SH 82 (now SH 18) in Kermit was added. On August 12, 1946, that section was transferred to SH 302. On December 1, 1953, the original SH 276 was canceled and the mileage was transferred to SH 302.

The current SH 276 was designated in 1960, running from SH 205 near Rockwall east to SH 34 in Quinlan. In 1990, the route was extended east to US 69 in Emory, with SH 276 absorbing the easternmost part of FM 35 in the process.

In early 2021, construction began near Quinlan to eliminate the SH 276/SH 34 concurrency by rerouting SH 276 along the south side of Quinlan from its intersection with SH 34 and reconnecting with the existing SH 276 west of the city. On February 27, 2023, the new route of 276 was officially opened, while the existing 276 that ran from FM 36 to Downtown Quinlan was shut down to be reconstructed into Bus. SH 276-D. On April 29, 2023, the intersection of SH 276 and Bus. SH 276-D was opened up to traffic.

== Junction list ==
County	Location	mi	km	Destinations	Notes
Rockwall	Rockwall	0.0	0.0	SH 205 (South Goliad Street) / Sids Road	
Rockwall	Rockwall	1.6	2.6	FM 549 south / Corporate Crossing – Heath	
Rockwall		4.6	7.4	FM 551 north – Fate	
Rockwall		5.7	9.2	FM 550 south – McLendon-Chisholm	
Rockwall		6.3	10.1	FM 548 – Royse City, Forney	
Hunt		11.7	18.8	FM 1565 – Caddo Mills, Poetry	
Hunt		12.7	20.4	FM 35 west – Royse City	
Hunt		16.8	27.0	FM 36 north – Caddo Mills	
Hunt		17.5	28.2	Bus. SH 276 east	
Hunt	Quinlan	18.9	30.4	Spur 264	
Hunt	Quinlan	19.3	31.1	SH 34	
Hunt		20.5	33.0	FM 751 south – Wills Point	
Hunt–Rains county line	Lake Tawakoni	26.8– 28.7	43.1– 46.2	Lake Tawakoni Causeway	
Rains	East Tawakoni	29.1	46.8	FM 513 north – Lone Oak	
Rains		31.7	51.0	FM 2737 north	
Rains		33.8	54.4	FM 47 – Point, Wills Point	
Rains		39.4	63.4	FM 3299 north	
Rains	Emory	40.6	65.3	US 69 / FM 2795 – Greenville, Mineola	Access to FM 2795 via connecting road
1.000 mi = 1.609 km; 1.000 km = 0.621 mi

== Gallery ==
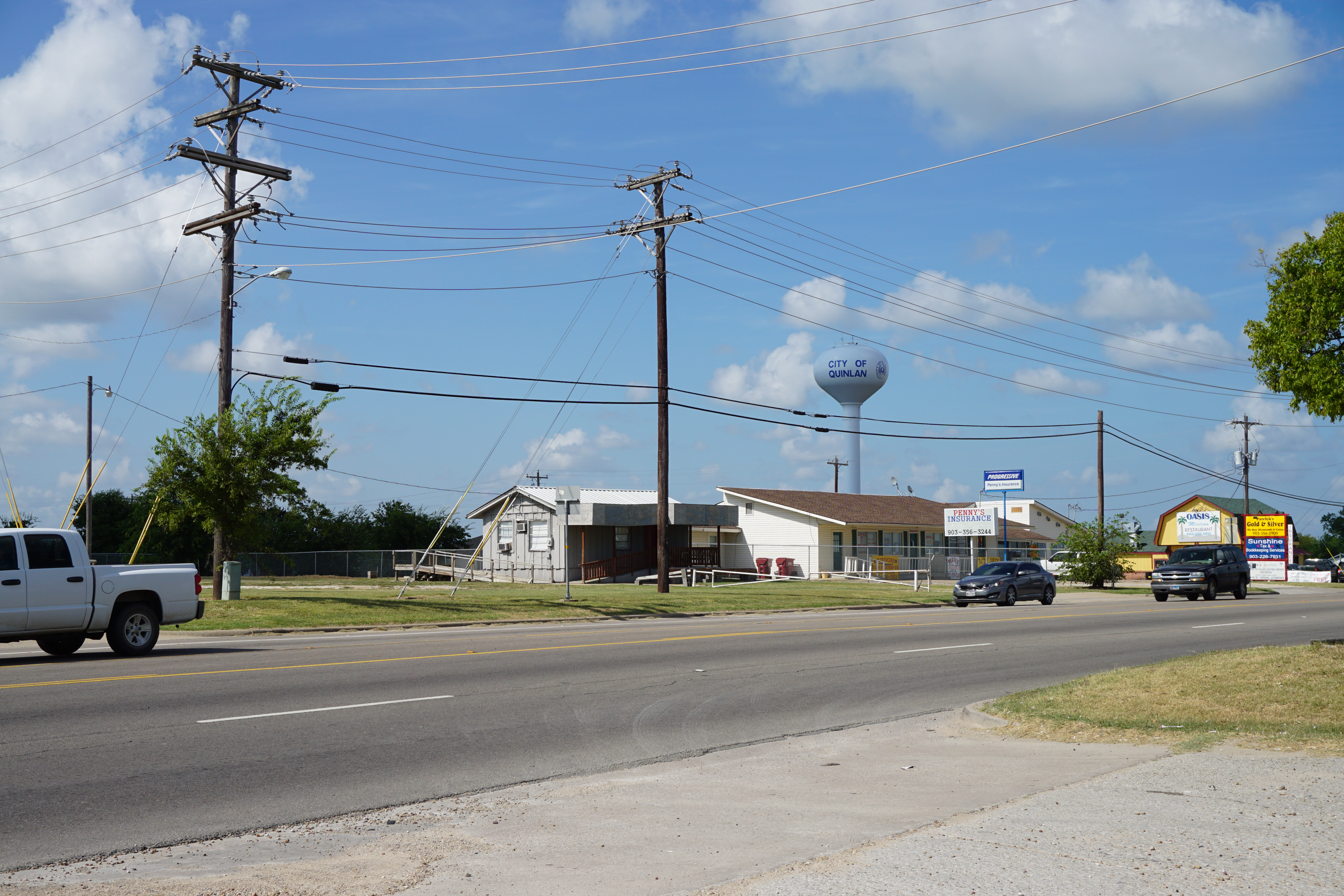
State Highway 276 in Quinlan

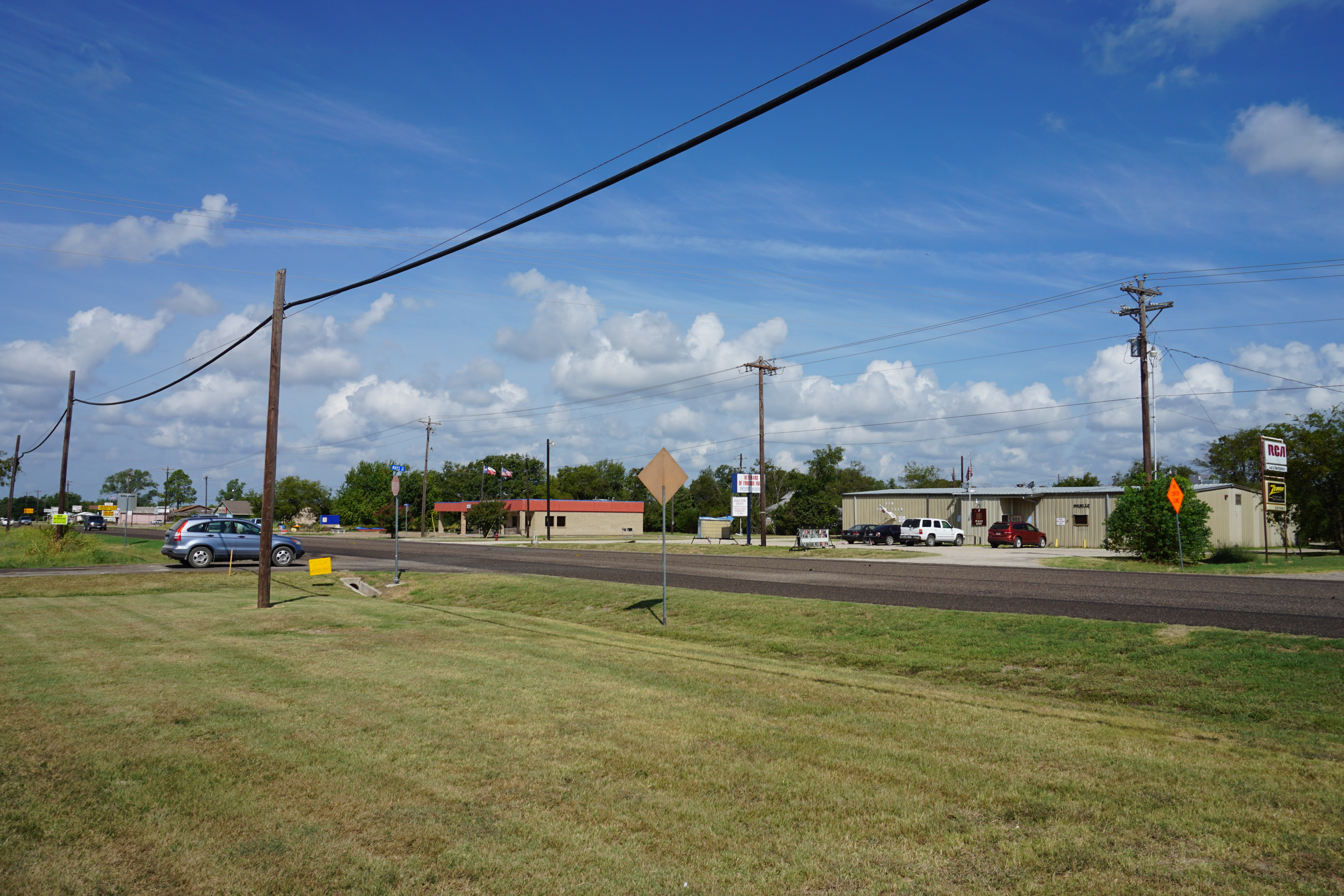
State Highway 276 in West Tawakoni

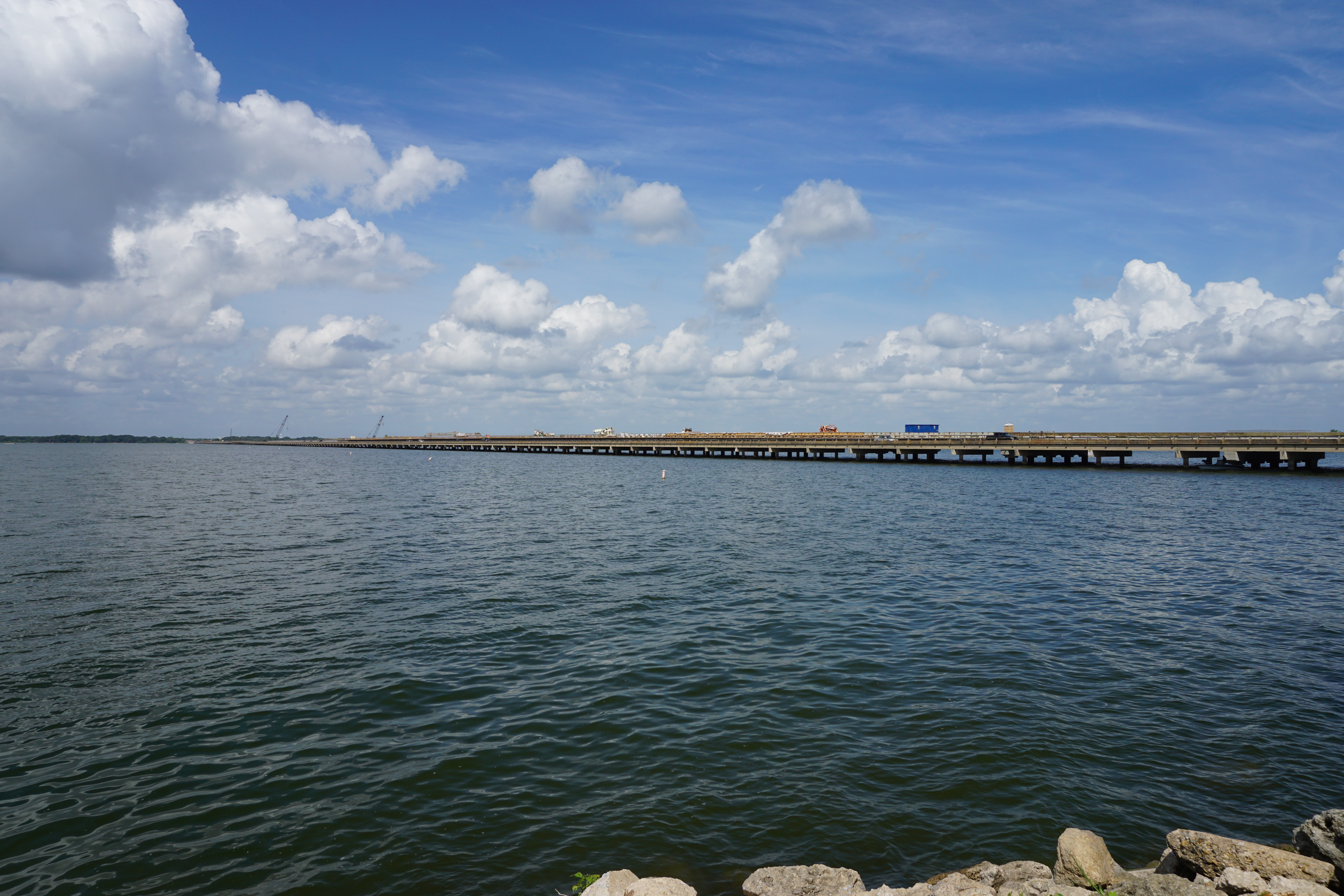
State Highway 276 crossing Lake Tawakoni on the Tawakoni Causeway

== Business route ==
Business State Highway 276-D
- Location: Quinlan
- Length: 1.8 mi (2.9 km)
- Existed: April 29, 2023–present

SH 276 officially has one business route, Business State Highway 276-D (Bus. SH 276-D), located in Quinlan. The business route was designated on April 29, 2023 when SH 276 was rerouted south of Quinlan. The highway is known locally as Main Street and travels along a former routing of its parent highway. Bus. SH 276-D begins at an intersection with SH 276 just west of Quinlan. The highway travels east along Main Street and intersects Spur 264 (an old routing of SH 34) a few blocks west of the town square. Leaving the town square, the highway continues to travel eastward along Main Street before ending at an intersection with SH 34.

Junction list

The entire route is in Hunt County.

Location	mi	km	Destinations	Notes
	0.0	0.0	SH 276 – Royse City, Rockwall	
Quinlan	1.2	1.9	Spur 264 south	
Quinlan	1.8	2.9	SH 34 – Greenville, Terrell, West Tawakoni	
1.000 mi = 1.609 km; 1.000 km = 0.621 mi
