= Black earth =

Black earth, black land or dark earth may refer to:

== Places ==
- Black Earth (town), Wisconsin, a town in the U.S. state of Wisconsin
- Black Earth, Wisconsin, a village in the U.S. state of Wisconsin
- Black Earth, Wisconsin (Potawatomi village), a former Native American village in the U.S. state of Wisconsin
- Central Black Earth economic region, one of 12 economic regions of Russia
- Central Black Earth Region, of Central Russia

== In science and technology ==
=== Archaeology ===
- Black Earth, the archaeology site at Carrier Mills, Illinois, United States, that was discovered before the strip mining
- Dark earth, or black earth, a geological and archaeological term
- Terramare, or Black Earth, a technology complex of north Italy

=== Soil science ===
- Black earth, the original meaning of chernozem, a type of humus-rich soil
- Black earth, the English translation of the Portuguese terra preta, or terra prêta do índio, very dark soils found in the Amazon Basin

== Arts, entertainment, and media ==
=== Fictional entities ===
- Black Earth, the Sindarin translation of Mordor, a fictional location in J. R. R. Tolkien's universe of Middle-earth
- Black Earth areas 1 and 2, in the Mega Man Battle Network 4 Blue Moon and Red Sun versions

=== Music ===
- Black Earth, a group comprising current and ex-members of Arch Enemy, named after the 1996 Arch Enemy album
- Black Earth (Arch Enemy album), a 1996 album by the Swedish melodic death metal band Arch Enemy
- Black Earth (Bohren & der Club of Gore album), a 2002 album by the German ambient jazz band Bohren & Der Club of Gore
- Black Earth, an album by Turkish pianist Fazıl Say

=== Other uses in arts, entertainment, and media ===
- Black Earth: The Holocaust as History and Warning, a 2015 book by historian Timothy D. Snyder
- Black Earth Rising, a 2018 television drama series
- Dark Earth (video game), a 1997 post-apocalyptic adventure game
- Black Earth (film), a 1923 German silent film

== See also ==
- Black soil (disambiguation)
- Blacklands (disambiguation)
