= Black soil =

Black soil may refer to:

- Chernozem, fertile black soils found in eastern Europe, Russia, India and the Canadian prairies
- Muck (soil), a soil made up primarily of humus from drained swampland
- Vertisol, dark cracking soils with a high clay
- Terra preta, "black earth" or soil of the Amazon river basin

== See also ==
- Black Earth (disambiguation)
