= West Tawakoni, Texas =

- City
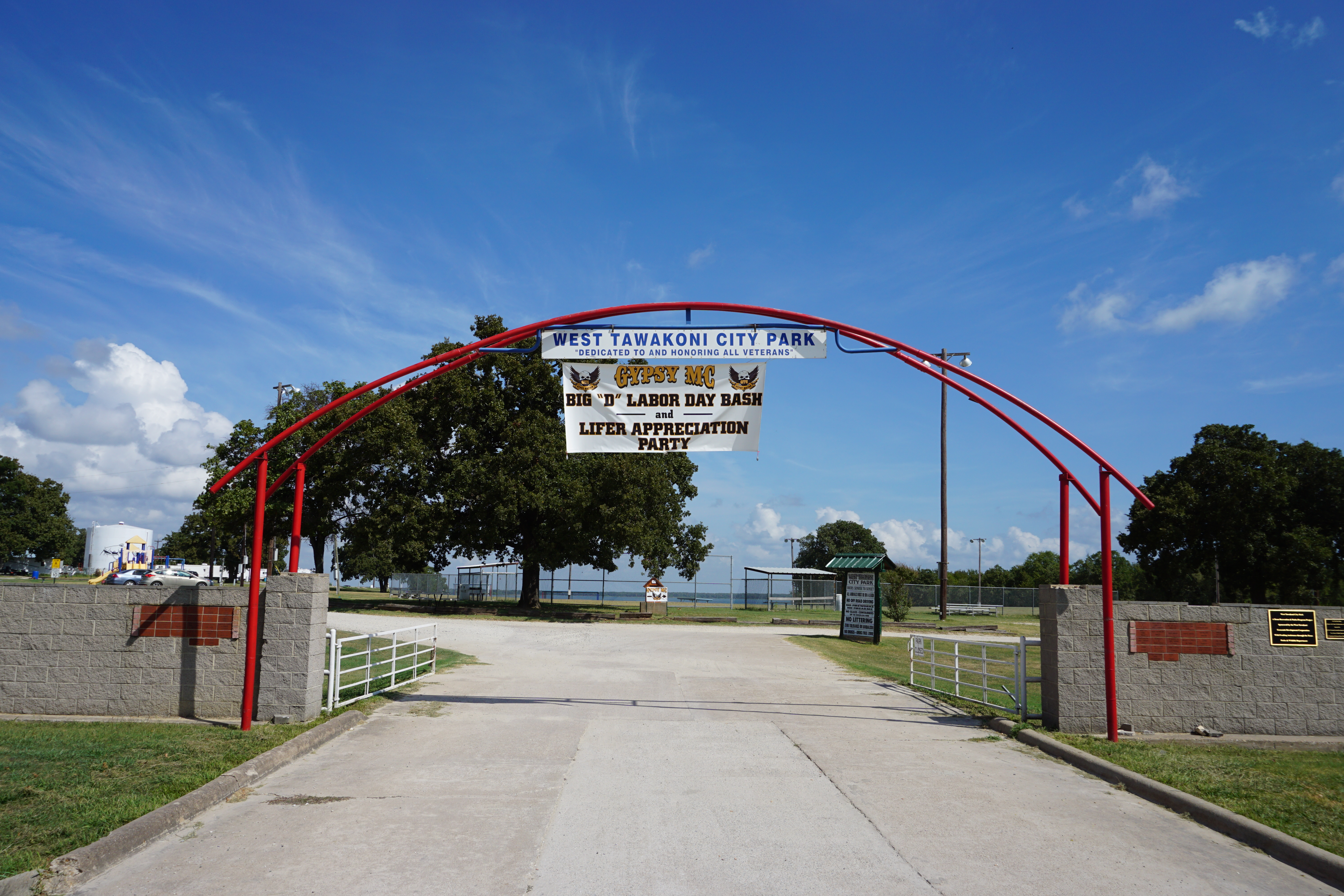
- West Tawakoni City Park
- Nickname: "Catfish Capital of Texas"
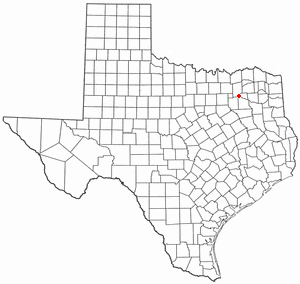
- Location of West Tawakoni, Texas

- Coordinates: 32°53′55″N 96°00′18″W
- Country: United States
- State: Texas
- County: Hunt

Area
  - Total: 2.88 sq mi (7.46 km^{2})
  - Land: 2.82 sq mi (7.31 km^{2})
  - Water: 0.058 sq mi (0.15 km^{2})
- Elevation: 456 ft (139 m)

Population (2020)
  - Total: 1,895
  - Density: 710.6/sq mi (274.35/km^{2})
- Time zone: UTC-6 (Central (CST))
  - Summer (DST): UTC-5 (CDT)
- ZIP code: 75474
- Area codes: 903, 430
- FIPS code: 48-77896
- GNIS feature ID: 2412229
- Website: www.cityofwesttawakoni.org

West Tawakoni (/təˈwɑːkəni/ tə-WAH-kə-nee) is a city in Hunt County, Texas, United States. The population was 1,895 at the 2020 census. West Tawakoni is located on the west side of Lake Tawakoni, while its twin city East Tawakoni is located on the east side of the lake in Rains County.

== Geography ==
West Tawakoni is located in southeastern Hunt County. It is bordered on three sides by Lake Tawakoni, a reservoir on the Sabine River. To the north is the lake's Caddo Inlet, to the south are Waco Bay and Kitsee Inlet, and to the east is the main body of the lake. Texas State Highway 276 passes through the northern part of the city, leading east across the lake 6 miles (10 km) to East Tawakoni and west the same distance to Quinlan. Greenville, the Hunt county seat, is 22 miles (35 km) to the north via Highway 276 and Highway 34, while downtown Dallas is 48 miles (77 km) to the west.

According to the United States Census Bureau, West Tawakoni has a total area of 2.2 square miles (5.7 km^{2}), of which 0.02 square miles (0.04 km^{2}), or 0.67%, are water.

== Demographics ==
Historical population
Census	Pop.	Note	%±
1970	465		—
1980	840		80.6%
1990	932		11.0%
2000	1,462		56.9%
2010	1,576		7.8%
2020	1,895		20.2%
U.S. Decennial Census

=== 2020 census ===
As of the 2020 census, West Tawakoni had a population of 1,895 people and 453 families residing in the city. For every 100 females there were 98.8 males, and for every 100 females age 18 and over there were 96.7 males age 18 and over.

There were 781 households in West Tawakoni, of which 30.5% had children under the age of 18 living in them. Of all households, 43.8% were married-couple households, 17.8% were households with a male householder and no spouse or partner present, and 26.8% were households with a female householder and no spouse or partner present. About 26.8% of all households were made up of individuals and 12.2% had someone living alone who was 65 years of age or older.

There were 951 housing units, of which 17.9% were vacant. The homeowner vacancy rate was 1.4% and the rental vacancy rate was 8.9%.

0.0% of residents lived in urban areas, while 100.0% lived in rural areas.

Racial composition as of the 2020 census
Race	Number	Percent
White	1,592	84.0%
Black or African American	11	0.6%
American Indian and Alaska Native	26	1.4%
Asian	21	1.1%
Native Hawaiian and Other Pacific Islander	6	0.3%
Some other race	66	3.5%
Two or more races	173	9.1%
Hispanic or Latino (of any race)	168	8.9%

== Education ==
West Tawakoni is served by the Quinlan Independent School District.
