= Mordor (disambiguation) =

Mordor is a fictional location in J. R. R. Tolkien's fictional world of Middle-earth.

Mordor may also refer to:

- Mordor: The Depths of Dejenol, a 1995 role-playing video game
- Mordor, Warsaw, an informal name for the area in the city of Warsaw, Poland
- Mordor Macula, a former nickname of the Neverland Regio, an area on Charon, a moon of Pluto
