= Raccoon Bend, Texas =

- Unincorporated community
- Location within Texas Location within the United States
- Coordinates: 30.0118889°N 96.1330158°W
- Country: United States
- State: Texas
- County: Austin
- Elevation: 180 ft (55 m)
- Time zone: UTC-6 (Central (CST))
  - Summer (DST): UTC-5 (CDT)
- Area code: 979
- GNIS feature ID: 1344692

Raccoon Bend is an unincorporated community in Austin County, in the U.S. state of Texas. According to the Handbook of Texas, the community had a population of 400 in 2000. It is located within the Greater Houston metropolitan area.

== History ==
Its population was 400 in 2000.

== Geography ==
Raccoon Bend is located south of Texas State Highway 159, about 8 mi (13 km) northeast of Bellville in northeastern Austin County.

== Education ==
Raccoon Bend had its own school in the 1930s, which closed by the second half of the 20th century. Today, the community is served by the Bellville Independent School District.
