= Blackland, Texas =

- Town
- Location within Texas Location within the United States
- Coordinates: 32.9°N 96.35°W
- Country: United States
- State: Texas
- County: Rockwall
- Settled: 1876
- Unincorporated: 1876
- Elevation: 571 ft (174 m)

Population (1990)
  - Total: 49
- Time zone: UTC-6 (CST)
  - Summer (DST): UTC-5 (CDT)
- ZIP codes: 75189
- GNIS feature ID: 1378014

Blackland is a town and near-ghost town in Rockwall County, Texas, United States. It is located approximately four miles southeast of Rockwall, the county seat on State Highway 276. The town had a population of 49 residents in the 1990 census. The Texas State Historical Association maintains an article on the town on their website.

== History ==
The town of Blackland was named after the Texas Blackland Prairies. Blackland's post office opened in 1876. In the 1880s, the population reached a peak of 125 people. At that time it had three businesses and a gristmill. Blackland farmers shipped cotton, wheat, and oats. At the beginning of the 20th century, the population dipped to 50 people. The school in Blackland employed two teachers who taught 79 students. The post office closed in 1903. In 1904, the population bumped up again to 114 people and declined to 14 in 1940. However, its closeness to Rockwall, Texas, the county seat, restricted its growth. The 1990 census showed 49 people still living in the town. The town is considered an historical subject by the Texas State Historical Association, who maintains an article discussing it on their website.

=== Historical rodeo connection ===
The 1880s when the town was at its largest happened to coincide with the early days of bronc riding. A Blackland man named William Brooks owned a bucking horse, a stallion named Burgett. One of the bronc riders who rode Burgett was Jim Woods in September 1893. One man, Foghorn Clancy, who witnessed it said later, "I cannot shut out the picture of the ride Jim Woods had on this great man-killing stallion, in September 1893, as being one of the greatest rides I have ever seen".

== Modern times ==
Blackland, Texas, is located in Rockwall County. The town is almost a ghost town. The grist mill, which had a major hand in keeping the town active, is closed. However, the Zollner Ranch, a farm worked by migrants, still stands and is owned and run by the Zollner family. An old wooden church also stands.

Local cities near Blackland located less than 30 miles (48 km) away include Rockwall, Royse City, Mobile City, McLendon-Chisholm, and Fate. Major cities near Blackland include: 17 miles to Garland, 22 miles to Plano, and 27 miles to Dallas. Blackland is located at 571 feet above sea level. It appears on the Royse City U.S. Geological Survey Map. Rockwall County is in the Central Time Zone.

== Bibliography ==
- Woerner, Gail Hughbanks (1998). A belly full of bedsprings : the history of bronc riding (1st ed.). Austin, Texas: Eakin Press. ISBN 1-57168-253-8.
