= McLendon-Chisholm, Texas =

- City
- Location of McLendon-Chisholm in Rockwall County, Texas
- Coordinates: 32°50′46″N 96°23′24″W
- Country: United States
- State: Texas
- County: Rockwall, Kaufman

Area
  - Total: 12.81 sq mi (33.18 km^{2})
  - Land: 12.50 sq mi (32.38 km^{2})
  - Water: 0.31 sq mi (0.80 km^{2}) 0.90%
- Elevation: 502 ft (153 m)

Population (2020)
  - Total: 3,562
  - Estimate (2025): 5,629
  - Density: 284.9/sq mi (110.0/km^{2})
- Time zone: UTC-6 (CST)
  - Summer (DST): UTC-5 (CDT)
- Area codes: 214, 469, 945, 972
- FIPS code: 48-45804
- GNIS feature ID: 1388560
- Website: http://www.mclendon-chisholm.com/

McLendon-Chisholm is a city in Rockwall and Kaufman counties, Texas, United States. As of the 2020 census, McLendon-Chisholm had a population of 3,562.

== Geography ==
McLendon-Chisholm is situated along State Highway 205 in south central Rockwall County, approximately six miles southeast of Rockwall.

According to the United States Census Bureau, the city has a total area of 9.9 square miles (26 km^{2}), of which 9.9 square miles (26 km^{2}) are land and 0.1 square miles (0.26 km^{2}) (0.90%) is covered by water.

== History ==
The community of McLendon-Chisholm began as two separate settlements: McLendon and Chisholm.

=== McLendon ===
Named for landowner P.A. McLendon, the community of McLendon was settled around 1870. He built a combination store, cotton gin, and blacksmith shop that remained in operation until 1975. A post office opened in 1880, and by 1896, McLendon was home to an estimated 150 residents. The post office closed in 1905. Throughout the early 20th century, the population hovered around 50.

=== Chisholm ===
The land that eventually became the site of Chisholm was given to Mexican War veteran King Latham in 1847. Enoch Parson Chisholm and his brother B. Frank Chisholm, from whom the community's name was derived, purchased 200 acres (0.81 km^{2}) from Latham in 1856. A few years later, Enoch purchased an additional 600 acres (2.4 km^{2}) for $2.00/acre. He organized the Chisholm Methodist Church in 1871 and the community of Chisholm was officially platted in 1886. In that same year, Berry Creek Academy was formed through the merger of two local schools. Chisholm's first store opened in 1890 and a post office was established in 1891. By 1898, Berry Creek Academy was the second-largest school in Rockwall County, boasting a total enrollment of 301 students. The Chisholm post office closed in 1905, but the community continued to grow. The population was estimated at 102 in 1904 and peaked around 200 in 1940. By the 1960s, that figure had dropped to around 167.

=== Incorporation ===
On October 18, 1969, the two communities incorporated as McLendon-Chisholm. Residents seeking zoning protection and the preservation of their rural lifestyles was the main reason behind the incorporation effort. By the mid-1970s, the city had approximately 170 residents. That number rapidly grew to 480 in the 1980s and 646 by the 1990 census. By 2000, the population had increased to 914, a 41 percent increase over the 1990 figure.

== Demographics ==
Historical population
Census	Pop.	Note	%±
1980	403		—
1990	646		60.3%
2000	914		41.5%
2010	1,373		50.2%
2020	3,562		159.4%
2025 (est.)	5,629		58.0%
U.S. Decennial Census

=== Racial and ethnic composition ===
Racial composition as of the 2020 census (NH = Non-Hispanic) (Note: Note: the US Census treats Hispanic/Latino as an ethnic category. This table excludes Latinos from the racial categories and assigns them to a separate category. Hispanics/Latinos can be of any race.)
Race	Number	Percent
White	2,724	76.5%
Black or African American	189	5.3%
American Indian and Alaska Native	10	0.3%
Asian	105	2.9%
Native Hawaiian and Other Pacific Islander	2	0.1%
Some other race	157	4.4%
Two or more races	375	10.5%
Hispanic or Latino (of any race)	455	12.8%

=== 2020 census ===
As of the 2020 census, McLendon-Chisholm had a population of 3,562. The median age was 39.8 years, 29.0% of residents were under the age of 18, and 12.0% of residents were 65 years of age or older. For every 100 females there were 100.1 males, and for every 100 females age 18 and over there were 97.3 males age 18 and over. The census also counted 1,003 families residing in the city.

There were 1,110 households in McLendon-Chisholm, of which 50.5% had children under the age of 18 living in them. Of all households, 79.7% were married-couple households, 8.2% were households with a male householder and no spouse or partner present, and 9.2% were households with a female householder and no spouse or partner present. About 8.2% of all households were made up of individuals and 4.2% had someone living alone who was 65 years of age or older.

2.0% of residents lived in urban areas, while 98.0% lived in rural areas.

There were 1,151 housing units, of which 3.6% were vacant. The homeowner vacancy rate was 1.7% and the rental vacancy rate was 8.8%.

== Education ==
The portion of the City of McLendon-Chisholm in Rockwall County, which makes up almost all of the city, is within the Rockwall Independent School District.

The portion in Kaufman County extends into the Terrell Independent School District.
