= Fate, Texas =

City in Rockwall County, Texas, United States

- City
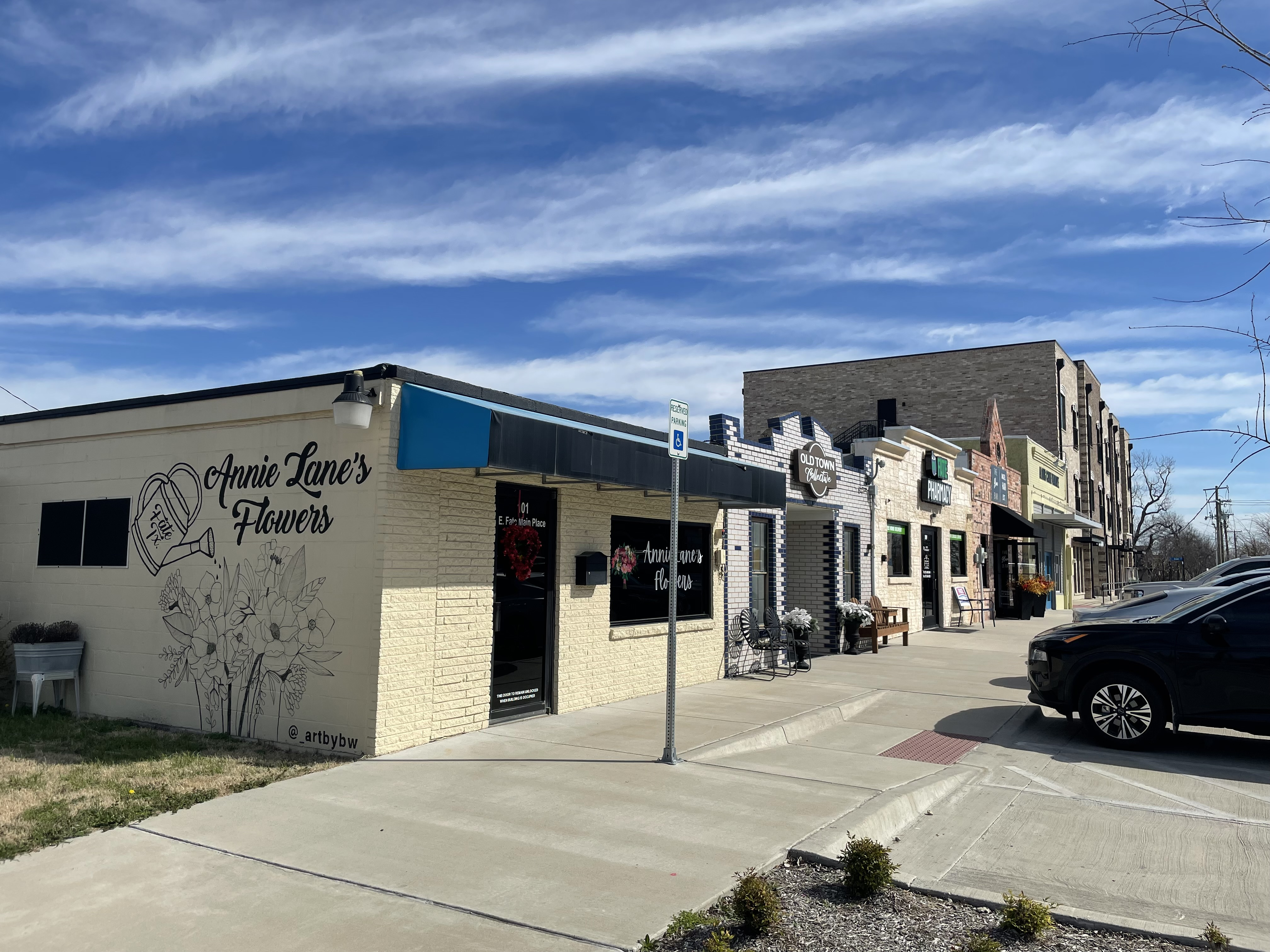
- Downtown Fate

- Logo

- Location of Fate in Rockwall County, Texas
- Coordinates: 32°56′29″N 96°22′53″W
- Country: United States
- State: Texas
- County: Rockwall

Government
  - Type: Council-Manager

Area
  - Total: 12.02 sq mi (31.13 km^{2})
  - Land: 11.85 sq mi (30.68 km^{2})
  - Water: 0.17 sq mi (0.45 km^{2})
- Elevation: 584 ft (178 m)

Population (2020)
  - Total: 17,958
  - Estimate (2025): 29,007
  - Density: 1,516/sq mi (585.3/km^{2})
- Time zone: UTC-6 (CST)
  - Summer (DST): UTC-5 (CDT)
- ZIP code: 75132, 75189, 75087, 75032
- Area codes: 214, 469, 945, 972
- FIPS code: 48-25572
- GNIS feature ID: 2410491
- Website: http://www.fatetx.gov

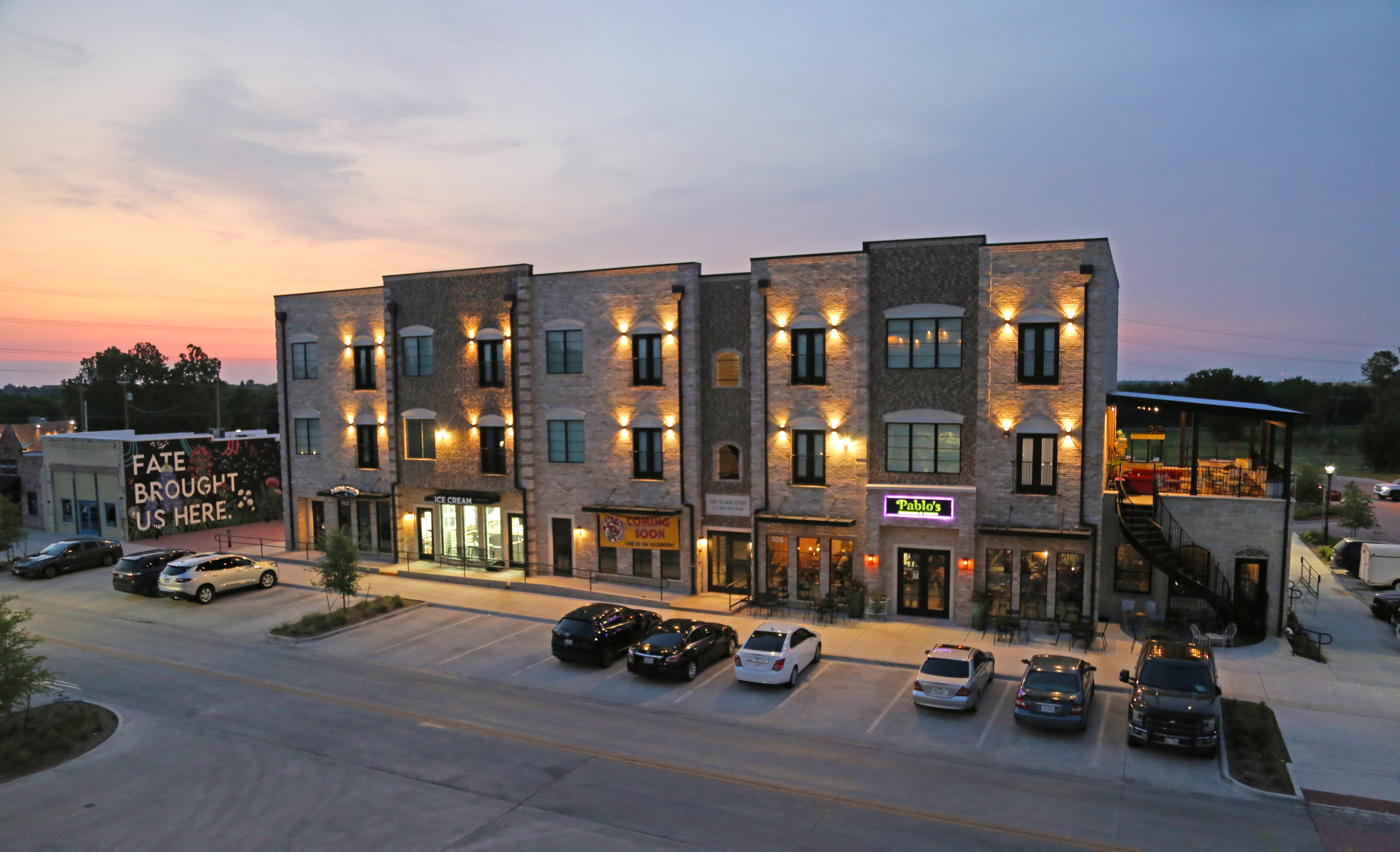
The Villages of Fate is the first mixed-use building in downtown Fate. This award-winning building was the first building project in the downtown revitalization program.

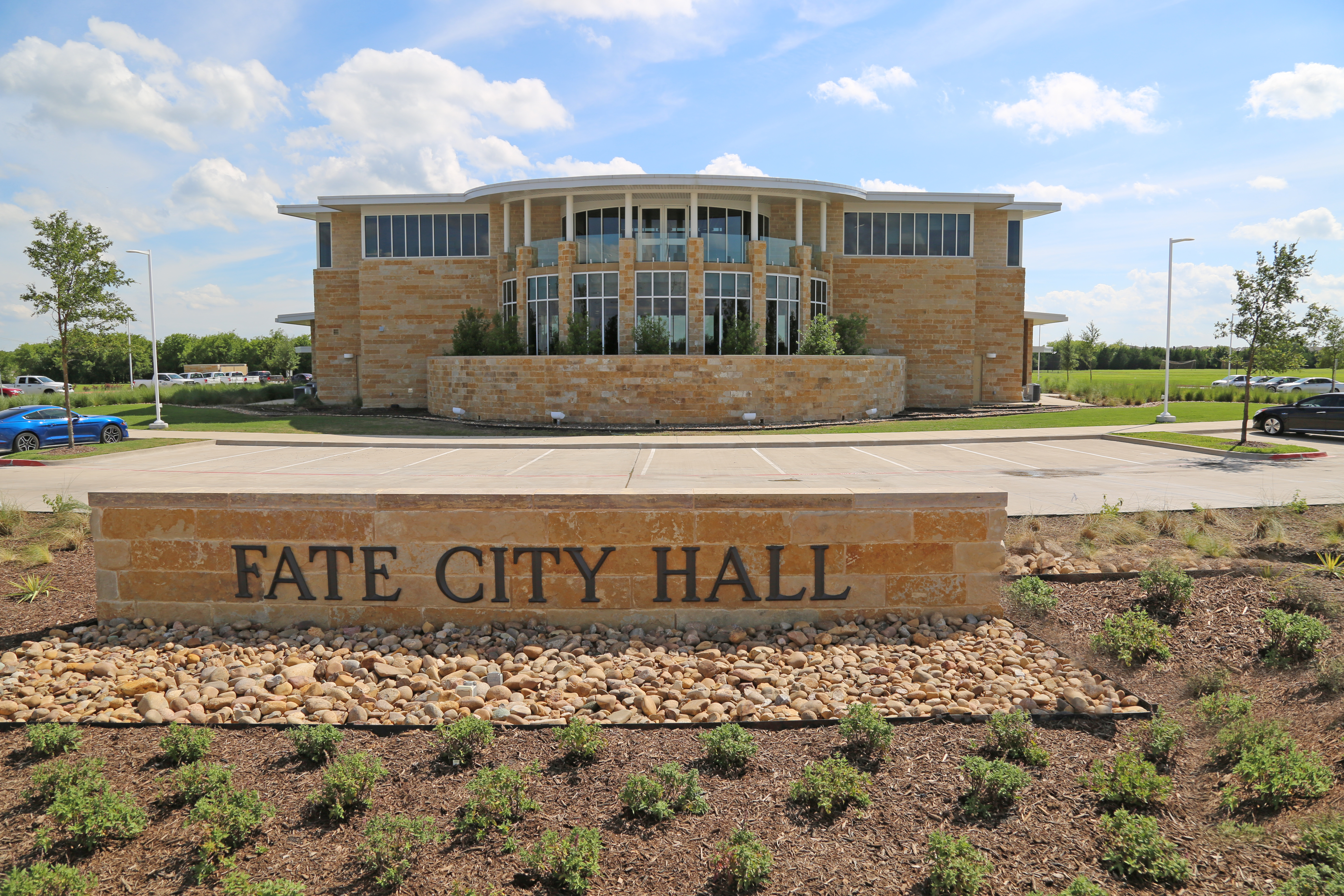
In February 2017, Fate finished construction of the new City Hall. The original City Hall was in downtown, but moved north to CD Boren and SH 66 for more space.

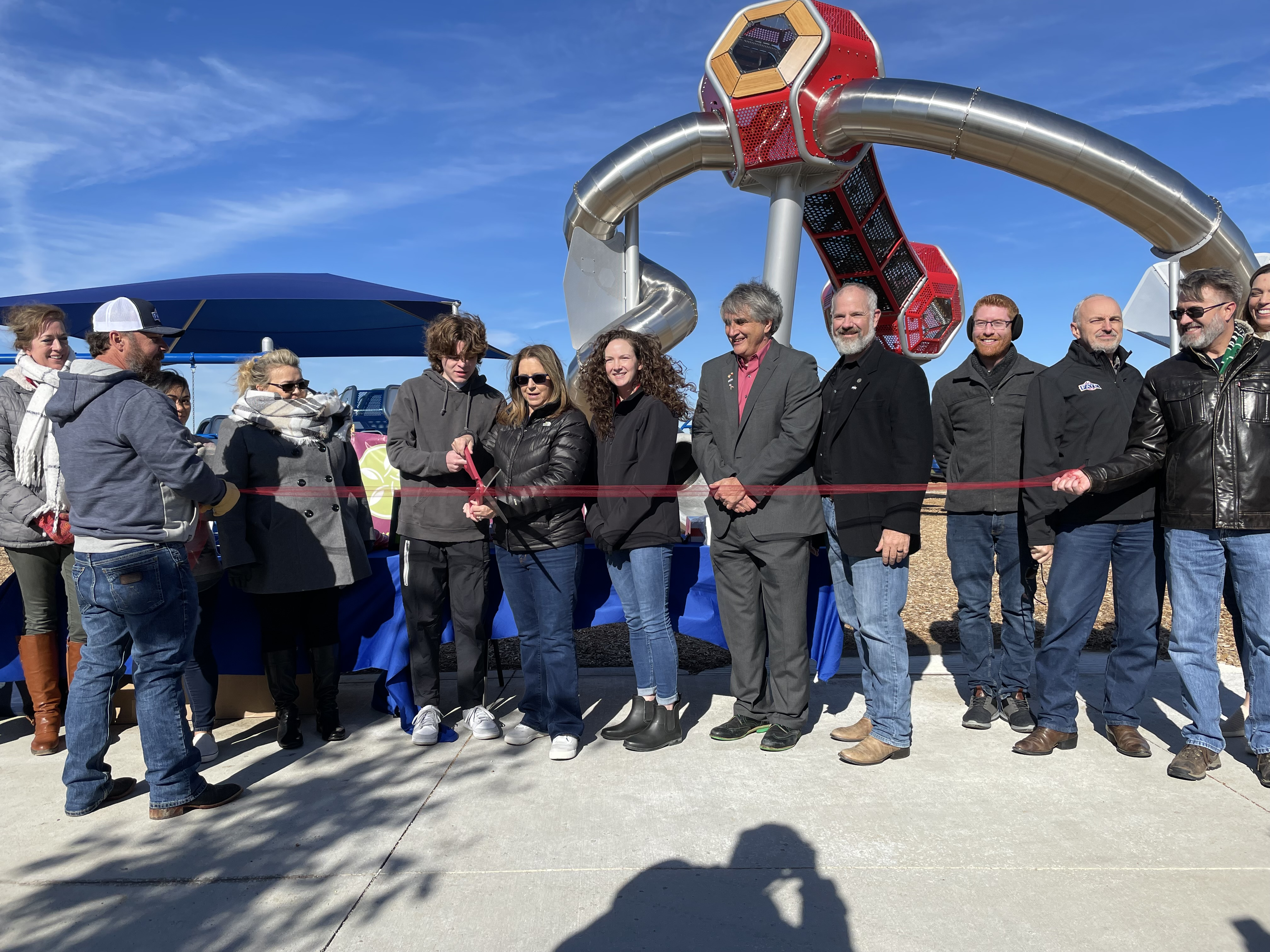
Fate's Joe Burger Park is located at 1251 E. Greenbriar Road. A ribbon cutting ceremony was held on November 12, 2022. The park's namesake, Joe Burger, served as Mayor of Fate for nearly two years and as a Fate City Council member for six years.

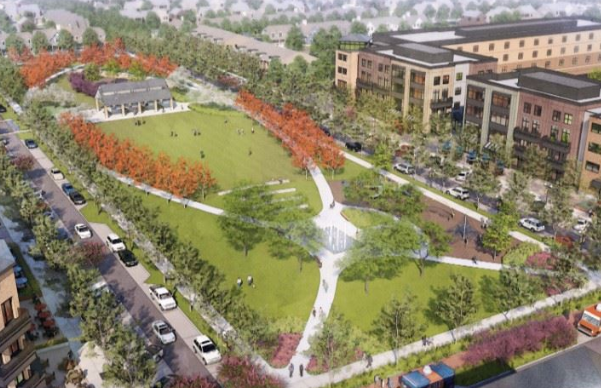
In February 2024, Fate's council approved a zoning change for a 267-acre tract of land. Named "Lafayette Crossing", this business oriented development will be built in a phased approach to support the commercial and retail needs of the City of Fate over the next 15-20 years and will shape the future of the area.

Fate is a city located in the center of Rockwall County, Texas, United States. The population in 2020 was 17,958, an increase from 6,357 in 2010, and 602 in 2000. In 2025, Fate's population was estimated to have grown to over 29,000.

== History ==
The name of the town is thought to have come from one of two of the towns influential residents, either William Lafayette Brown or GW Lafayette Peyton, both of whom were nicknamed "Fate" and lived in the area during the 1860s. At that time, land ownership, a post office, and the railroad played a vital role in the naming of the City of Fate. The town was settled shortly after the Civil War and was originally located 1.5 miles to the north of Downtown Fate's current location today. The town of Barnes, named after a Dr. Wiley Turner Barnes, was developed where Fate's current Downtown is located. A post office was established in Fate on July 13, 1880, with Harvey Peyton White as its postmaster.

As the area continued to develop, the Missouri-Kansas-Texas (MKT) Railroad was constructed in 1886 and ran through Barnes. This brought rapid growth to the area and spurred both Fate and Barnes to combine into one town on February 11, 1887, in order to allow residents access to postal services and the railroad.

During the late 1800s Fate prospered. The town grew to include four doctors, two cotton gins, two grocery stores, a barbershop, a butcher, a confectionary, a grain elevator, and a newspaper called The Fate Review. In the early 1900s the town experienced several tragedies. In 1906 a fire engulfed the south side of the city's business district. Because there was no fire station nearby, this caused considerable damage to the businesses.

In 1910 another fire destroyed the north side of the town. The great depression of the 1930s caused economic hardship to farmers in the area and forced many to lose their land. In 1933 more tragedy struck as a tornado destroyed parts of the town. As the population began to dwindle, the churches in Fate decided to combine into one united church, which brought citizens together and formed a tight-knit Christian community.

In the 1940s during World War II, Fate had lost all its mail routes, its school became a one-teacher school, and the railroad depot was sold to Dallas' Old City Park. By 1950, the population had decreased to a mere 150 people, causing Fate's school to shut down and send its students to the Royse City Independent School District or the Rockwall Independent School District. However, using the lumber from the old school house, Fate residents built a Community Center, which is still in use, and was recently renovated, in Downtown Fate.

After the 1960s, Fate finally began grow again. In the 1970s, a neighborhood called Woodcreek began to be developed. In the 1980s more technology, such as the telephone and 911-system contributed to additional growth. By the 1990s Fate's population had grown to 475 with a grocery store, upholstery, printer, and restaurants calling the town home. New subdivisions and developments continued to cause the population of Fate to boom in the early 2000s. In 2000 Fate's population was barely over 600. As of 2025, the population of Fate is estimated to have come close to 30,000.

== Geography ==
Downtown Fate is 4.8 miles to the east of downtown Rockwall on Texas State Highway 66. FM 551 is the most northern road that is just north of I-30. Downtown Royse City is 4.5 miles to the northeast.

The city has a total area of roughly 12.4 mi^{2} (32 km^{2}). of which 0.4 square miles (1.0 km^{2}) is covered by water.

== Demographics ==
Historical population
Census	Pop.	Note	%±
1920	299		—
1930	194		−35.1%
1940	127		−34.5%
1950	141		11.0%
1960	191		35.5%
1970	329		72.3%
1980	263		−20.1%
1990	475		80.6%
2000	497		4.6%
2010	6,357		1,179.1%
2020	17,958		182.5%
2025 (est.)	29,007		61.5%
U.S. Decennial Census

=== 2020 census ===
As of the 2020 census, Fate had a population of 17,958 and a median age of 32.6 years; 32.8% of residents were under the age of 18, 7.7% were 65 years of age or older, and women made up 52.1% of the population.

For every 100 females there were 95.6 males, and for every 100 females age 18 and over there were 91.7 males age 18 and over.

95.4% of residents lived in urban areas, while 4.6% lived in rural areas.

There were 5,528 households in Fate, of which 55.1% had children under the age of 18 living in them. Of all households, 71.3% were married-couple households, 8.6% were households with a male householder and no spouse or partner present, and 15.1% were households with a female householder and no spouse or partner present. About 10.0% of all households were made up of individuals and 3.0% had someone living alone who was 65 years of age or older.

There were 5,751 housing units, of which 3.9% were vacant. The homeowner vacancy rate was 2.7% and the rental vacancy rate was 5.3%.

Persons age 25 or older who graduated high school made up 95.8% of that population, with 44.6% of those adults holding a bachelor's degree or higher.

Racial composition as of the 2020 census
Race	Number	Percent
White	11,801	65.7%
Black or African American	1,747	9.7%
American Indian and Alaska Native	164	0.9%
Asian	579	3.2%
Native Hawaiian and Other Pacific Islander	20	0.1%
Some other race	1,049	5.8%
Two or more races	2,598	14.5%
Hispanic or Latino (of any race)	3,889	21.7%

Fate racial composition as of 2020 (NH = Non-Hispanic) (Note: Note: the US Census treats Hispanic/Latino as an ethnic category. This table excludes Latinos from the racial categories and assigns them to a separate category. Hispanics/Latinos can be of any race.)
Race	Number	Percentage
White (NH)	10,815	60.22%
Black or African American (NH)	1,711	9.53%
Native American or Alaska Native (NH)	86	0.48%
Asian (NH)	570	3.17%
Pacific Islander (NH)	17	0.09%
Some Other Race (NH)	56	0.31%
Mixed/Multi-Racial (NH)	814	4.53%
Hispanic or Latino	3,889	21.66%
Total	17,958	

== Education ==
Fate is served by the Rockwall Independent School District in the southern and western portions of the city and the Royse City Independent School District in the northern and eastern portions. Royse City ISD provides three campuses in Fate; Miss May Vernon Elementary School, Harry H Herndon Elementary School and Bobby Summers Middle School.

The Rockwall ISD has two elementary campuses. Billie Stevenson Elementary School, which opened at the start of the 2013–2014 school year and is located in the city's Woodcreek subdivision. As well as, Lupe Garcia Elementary, which opened at the start of the 2021–2022 school year and is located in the Williamsburg subdivision.

Royse City ISD will open Fate's first high school since 1933 located in the northern section of Fate off of FM 552. Worthy Fate High School is set to open in August 2027. The district's Facility Naming Committee reviewed more than 440 name suggestions from the Royse City ISD community in the process of selecting a name and mascot for the school, and came to the name Worthy Fate High School or WFHS. The new campus, approved in a May 2023 Bond Referendum, is set to open in August 2027. Current planning would allow the school to open with freshmen and sophomores and grow into a 9-12th grade school by 2030. Royse City ISD started construction of the new high school in the Spring of 2024. The campus’ offerings will reflect that of Royse City High School with career and tech programs, dual credit programs, associate degrees, ag facilities, fine arts and athletic facilities. After studying existing district and school brands, exploring a competitive logo analysis and reviewing five color combinations the group came to a consensus.

== Site of remarriage of Lee Harvey Oswald's widow ==
The town made national news in 1965 when Marina Oswald, the widow of accused presidential assassin Lee Harvey Oswald, remarried a little more than 18 months after her husband's slaying. Electronics worker Kenneth Porter and she worked at eluding reporters, who had learned of the engagement, and traveled to Fate to be wed by Carl Leonard Jr., a justice of the peace.

== Notable people ==
- Ralph Hall, former member of the US House of Representatives was born here
