= Union Valley, Texas =

City in Texas, United States

- City
- Location within Texas Location within the United States
- Coordinates: 32°55′38″N 96°15′4″W
- Country: United States
- State: Texas
- County: Hunt

Area
  - Total: 2.47 sq mi (6.41 km^{2})
  - Land: 2.46 sq mi (6.37 km^{2})
  - Water: 0.015 sq mi (0.04 km^{2})
- Elevation: 513 ft (156 m)

Population (2020)
  - Total: 370
  - Density: 150/sq mi (58/km^{2})
- Time zone: UTC-6 (Central (CST))
  - Summer (DST): UTC-5 (CDT)
- ZIP code: 75189
- Area codes: 903, 430
- FIPS code: 48-74372
- GNIS feature ID: 1379196

Union Valley is a city in Hunt County, Texas, United States. The city was incorporated in 2007. The population at the 2020 census was 370.

== Geography ==
Union Valley is located approximately 5 miles (8 km) west of Quinlan in southwestern Hunt County. It is 19 miles (31 km) southwest of Greenville, the Hunt county seat, 7 miles (11 km) southeast of Royse City, and 36 miles (58 km) northeast of Dallas.

Union Valley has an area of 1.8 square miles (4.6 km^{2}) within its city limits, of which 0.01 square miles (0.02 km^{2}), or 0.48%, are water. The city contains households and businesses which front Farm to Market Roads 1565 and 35. It also includes the northeastern corner of FM 1565 and State Highway 276 as well as a portion of Old Quinlan Road.

== History ==
Settlement of the area began in the 1880s. From its inception, Union Valley served area farmers as a school and church community. It was bypassed by the railroads that crisscrossed Hunt County in the late 1880s and early 1890s. This resulted in the community remaining lightly populated throughout the twentieth century.

Moves to incorporate Union Valley arose in response to the rapidly growing and expanding communities to the west in neighboring Rockwall County, particularly Royse City, which grew from a population of 2,957 in 2000 to approximately 9,300 in 2007. In the years preceding 2007, Royse City had been annexing land extending into Hunt county, and Union Valley residents felt that incorporation was the only way to prevent annexation by Royse City or any other city. Fears of higher taxes and a loss of the area's rural, close-knit feel were the main concerns raised by Union Valley residents.

The first attempt at incorporation took place in May 2006, but was defeated by a vote of 151 (89.3%) against and 18 (10.7%) for. This was due in part to some residents fearing that liquor stores would come to the community. After this defeat, a series of public meetings on the issue occurred in 2007 and a second incorporation vote was held on November 6, 2007, in which it was approved by 83.3% of the voters. A total of 90 votes were cast (out of 173 registered voters), 75 in favor of incorporation and 15 against. According to the Union Valley incorporation committee, the city has about 78 households.

== Demographics ==
Historical population
Census	Pop.	Note	%±
2010	307		—
2020	370		20.5%
U.S. Decennial Census; 2020 Census

=== 2020 census ===
As of the 2020 census, Union Valley had a population of 370. The median age was 47.5 years. 20.3% of residents were under the age of 18 and 21.1% of residents were 65 years of age or older. For every 100 females there were 96.8 males, and for every 100 females age 18 and over there were 95.4 males age 18 and over.

0.0% of residents lived in urban areas, while 100.0% lived in rural areas.

There were 138 households in Union Valley, of which 36.2% had children under the age of 18 living in them. Of all households, 79.0% were married-couple households, 6.5% were households with a male householder and no spouse or partner present, and 9.4% were households with a female householder and no spouse or partner present. About 10.1% of all households were made up of individuals and 2.8% had someone living alone who was 65 years of age or older.

There were 142 housing units, of which 2.8% were vacant. The homeowner vacancy rate was 0.8% and the rental vacancy rate was 0.0%.

Racial composition as of the 2020 census
Race	Number	Percent
White	312	84.3%
Black or African American	5	1.4%
American Indian and Alaska Native	0	0.0%
Asian	0	0.0%
Native Hawaiian and Other Pacific Islander	1	0.3%
Some other race	12	3.2%
Two or more races	40	10.8%
Hispanic or Latino (of any race)	58	15.7%

=== 2010 census ===
At the 2010 United States census there were 307 people, 113 households, and 96 families residing in the city. The racial makeup of the city was 85.99% White (81.43% Non-Hispanic White), 3.91% African American, 0.33% Asian, 0.33% Native American, 7.82% from other races, and 1.63% from two or more races. Hispanic or Latino of any race were 12.70% of the population.

== Government ==
Union Valley is a Class C municipality, which under state law means that the city cannot annex land totaling more than 2 square miles (5.2 km^{2}). Class C municipalities also don't have to provide services traditionally found in cities such as fire and police departments, or water/sewer services. The Hunt County Sheriff's Department provides police services to Union Valley, as it did prior to incorporation.

In addition to the incorporation vote on November 6, 2007, residents were given the option of choosing their city officials in case the proposition passed. There were three candidates – Jay Atkins, Jeffrey A. Francis, and Daniel W. Council. Residents could choose to vote for none, one, two, or all three candidates. Jay Atkins received 42 votes, followed by Daniel Council with 26, and Jeffrey Francis with 24. Since Atkins obtained the highest number of votes, he became mayor, while the other two were designated commissioners. They were sworn in on November 19, during a special session of the Hunt County Commissioners Court.

The council meets in the city hall at the volunteer fire station. It was formed in 1976 and has a service area of 68 square miles (180 km^{2}).

The first city council meeting took place on December 6, 2007. Eddie "Chris" Elliott was named City Secretary, while Commissioner Jeffrey Francis was named Mayor Pro-Tem. It was also decided that council members would be elected for staggered two-year terms.

Voters were also asked whether they favored a one percent sales and use tax. Of 24 votes cast, 19 (79.2%) voted for the measure and 5 (20.8%) voted against it. A non-binding referendum regarding the future imposition of a small property tax to expand the fire station was supported by the same 19–5 margin.

After six months as mayor, Jay Atkins decided not to pursue another term and started his campaign for Hunt County Commissioner Precinct #2. In municipal elections on May 10, 2008, City Secretary Eddie "Chris" Elliott was the sole candidate for mayor and received 21 votes. Three candidates competed for two open seats on the city commission. Daniel W. Council, elected commissioner in November 2007, finished first with 15 votes. The second seat was won by Michelle Oznick, who received 14 votes. Oznick was a supporter of incorporation for Union Valley and served on the annexation committee. Commissioner and mayor pro-tem Jeffrey Francis lost his seat after placing third with 12 votes. In October 2009 the council celebrated the Grand Opening of the new city hall in Union Valley next to the (volunteer) fire station with much support from the citizens and the fire department.

In May 2010 elections were held and Mayor Eddie "Chris" Elliott ran for a second term and his opponent was Pat Miller. Running for a second term for a council position was Michell Oznick. Running for council also were two others, Jay Thompson which has supported the city since its inception and Craig Waskow. The results of the election were the incumbent, Mayor Elliott, won by a narrow margin of 27 votes to 25 for Pat Miller. For council the results were Jay Thompson 27 votes, Craig Waskow 27 votes and Michelle Oznich 25 votes. Pro-Tem was discussed between both Jay Thompson and Craig Waskow. The two agreed that Craig Waskow would serve as Mayor Pro-Tem in the absence of the mayor.

== Education ==
Most of Union Valley is served by the Quinlan Independent School District, although small portions of the city lie in the Royse City Independent School District.

Country Life Montessori School is a private Montessori school, with a 70-acre (280,000 m^{2}) ranch campus in Union Valley. The school currently serves children ages 18 months through kindergarten.
