= National Register of Historic Places listings in Rockwall County, Texas =

Location of Rockwall County in Texas

This is a list of the National Register of Historic Places listings in Rockwall County, Texas.

This is intended to be a complete list of properties listed on the National Register of Historic Places in Rockwall County, Texas. There are two properties listed on the National Register in the county one of which is also a Recorded Texas Historic Landmark.

This National Park Service list is complete through NPS recent listings posted December 12, 2025.

== Current listings ==
The locations of National Register properties may be seen in a mapping service provided.

	Name on the Register	Image	Date listed	Location	City or town	Description
1	First Methodist Church of Rockwall	First Methodist Church of Rockwall	July 11, 2007 (#07000691)	303 E. Rusk; 32°55′51″N 96°27′29″W	Rockwall	
2	Royse City Lodge No. 663 A.F. & A.M.	Royse City Lodge No. 663 A.F. & A.M.	October 28, 1994 (#94001242)	102 S. Arch St. 32°58′30″N 96°19′50″W	Royse City	Recorded Texas Historic Landmark

== See also ==
- National Register of Historic Places listings in Texas
- Recorded Texas Historic Landmarks in Rockwall County
