= Texas State Highway 66 =

State highway in Texas

State Highway 66

Route information
- Maintained by TxDOT
- Length: 34.96 mi (56.26 km)
- Existed: by 1933–present

Major junctions
- West end: SH 78 at Garland
- East end: US 69 / US 380 at Greenville

Location
- Country: United States
- State: Texas
- Counties: Dallas, Rockwall, Collin, Hunt

Highway system
- Highways in Texas; Interstate; US; State; Former; Toll; Loops; Spurs; FM/RM; Park; Rec
| ← US 66 | → US 67 |

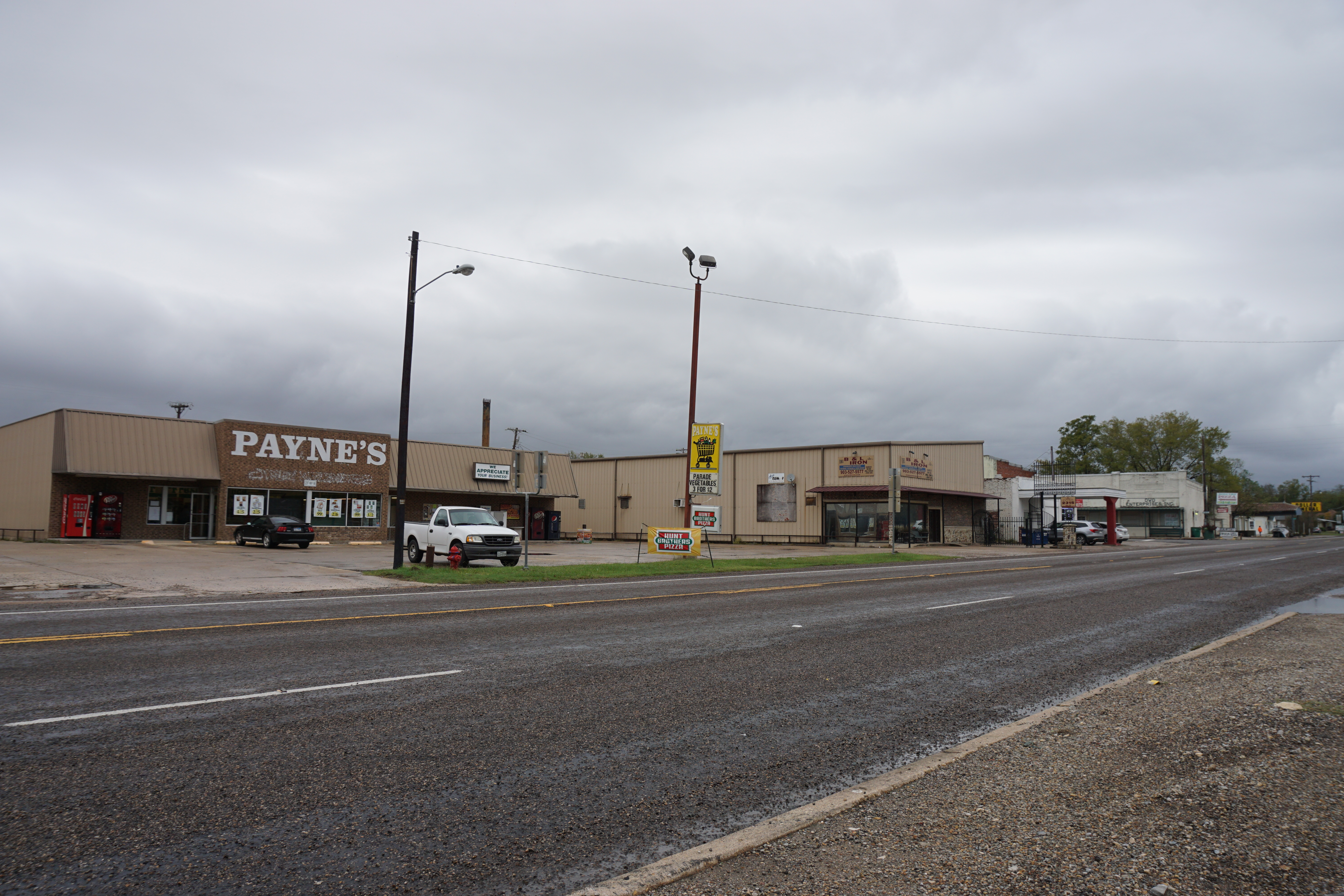
Texas State Highway 66 in Caddo Mills

State Highway 66 (SH 66) is a state highway in the U.S. state of Texas, connecting Garland to Greenville. The route runs roughly parallel to Interstate 30, passing through Rowlett, Rockwall, Fate, Royse City, and Caddo Mills. It also crosses Lake Ray Hubbard twice. It is known locally as Lakeview Parkway in Rowlett and as Avenue B in Garland.

== History ==
SH 66 was previously designated first on August 21, 1923 as a route from Bogata northeast through Clarksville toward the Oklahoma town of Idabel, replacing part of SH 37. On June 24, 1931, this route had been added as a northern extent of SH 37, and SH 66 was instead assigned along an ambitious route spanning the entire state from Wichita Falls to Pharr, replacing part of SH 25, part of SH 24, part of SH 108 (causing the rest of SH 108 to be cancelled in exchange of mileage, but that section was restored on July 24, 1932), all of SH 145, and part of SH 12. On November 30, 1932, it was extended south to the Rio Grande near Hidalgo, replacing part of SH 4, which was rerouted west. On October 17, 1933, it was extended to Oklahoma following SH 79. On July 15, 1935, everything north of Wichita Falls was cancelled and the section from the Brazos River to Stephenville was cancelled (as they were not built yet). On November 5, 1935, the section from the Brazos River to Stephenville was restored. On February 11, 1937, the section north of Wichita Falls was restored, but as part of SH 79 only. On September 26, 1939, this entire second route was cancelled in favor of US 281, with one section from US 281 to the Hidalgo International Bridge becoming US 281 Spur (now Spur 241).

The current route was designated on November 30, 1961, replacing FM 7 and U.S. Highway 67, which was rerouted atop I-30.

== Junction list ==
| County | Location | mi | km | Destinations | Notes |
|---|---|---|---|---|---|
| Dallas | Garland | 0.0 | 0.0 | SH 78 – Dallas, Wylie | |
| Dallas | Rowlett | 4.4 | 7.1 | Pres. George Bush Turnpike | |
| Rockwall | Rockwall | 10.3 | 16.6 | SH 205 south (Alamo Road) | |
| Rockwall | Rockwall | 10.4 | 16.7 | SH 205 north (Goliad Street) | |
| Rockwall | Rockwall | 11.5 | 18.5 | FM 1141 north to FM 552 | |
| Rockwall | Fate | 13.0 | 20.9 | FM 3549 to I-30 | |
| Rockwall | Fate | 15.1 | 24.3 | FM 551 south to I-30 | |
| Rockwall | | 18.1 | 29.1 | FM 552 west | |
| Rockwall | | 18.3 | 29.5 | FM 1138 north – Nevada | |
| Rockwall | Royse City | 19.6 | 31.5 | FM 548 south | |
| Collin | Royse City | 20.5 | 33.0 | FM 1777 north – Josephine | |
| Hunt | | 22.8 | 36.7 | FM 2642 south | |
| Hunt | Caddo Mills | 27.3 | 43.9 | FM 1565 south – Union Valley | |
| Hunt | Caddo Mills | 27.6 | 44.4 | FM 6 east – Josephine | |
| Hunt | Caddo Mills | 28.2 | 45.4 | FM 36 south | Southern end of FM 36 concurrency |
| Hunt | Caddo Mills | 28.3 | 45.5 | FM 36 north | Northern end of FM 36 concurrency |
| Hunt | | 33.2 | 53.4 | FM 1570 east | |
| Hunt | | 33.6 | 54.1 | FM 3211 west – Clinton | |
| Hunt | Greenville | 35.0 | 56.3 | US 69 / US 380 – Denison, McKinney, Emory | |
1.000 mi = 1.609 km; 1.000 km = 0.621 mi: Concurrency terminus
