= Mule Dowell =

American football player (1913–1992)

No. 25
- Positions: End, fullback

Personal information
- Born: June 27, 1913; Ben Franklin, Texas, U.S.
- Died: August 12, 1992 (aged 79); Richardson, Texas, U.S.
- Listed height: 6 ft 2 in (1.88 m)
- Listed weight: 206 lb (93 kg)

Career information
- High school: Royse City (Royse City, Texas)
- College: Texas Tech

Career history
- Chicago Cardinals (1935–1936)

Awards and highlights
- First-team All-Border Conference (1934)

Career NFL statistics
- Rushing yards: 155
- Rushing average: 2.6
- Stats at Pro Football Reference

Gwyn Clark "Mule" Dowell (June 27, 1913 – August 12, 1992) was an American professional football player, businessman, and gunnery officer. He played college football for the Texas Tech Matadors, earning the nickname "Mule" due to his power on the football field. He was a first-team All-Border Conference selection in 1934. Dowell played two seasons of pro football with the Chicago Cardinals of the National Football League (NFL), as a backup fullback in 1935 and a starting end and fullback in 1936.

After his football career, Dowell worked in Texas Tech's athletics department, served in the military, was an executive in the automobile industry, and a member of the Lubbock, Texas school board. He owned auto dealerships throughout Texas, and served as national chairman of the Dodge Dealers' Advisory Council as well as chairman of the truck committee of the National Automobile Dealers Association. Dowell was awarded the Legion of Merit for action aboard a aircraft carrier during the Battle off Samar.

== Early life ==
Gwyn Clark Dowell was born on June 27, 1913, in Ben Franklin, Texas. He attended Royse City High School in Royse City, Texas, where he earned 15 athletic letters. Dowell excelled as a back on the football team, helping the Bulldogs win their first district championship in 1930. He was inducted into the Royse City Independent School District Hall of Fame in 2017.

== College career ==
Dowell enrolled at Texas Tech University in 1931. He had planned to join the baseball team, but learned that the program was discontinued. That year, Dowell played on the freshman football team under head coach Dell Morgan as the starting fullback. He went on to earn three letters in football and two letters in track and field, participating in the shot put and discus throw events.

Dowell played varsity football with the Matadors from 1932 to 1934 under head coach Pete Cawthon, who called Dowell "the best ball carrying back in Tech's history." He immediately became the tallest member of the team, but he missed several games in 1932 due to a knee injury and eligibility issues. In their 1934 homecoming game, Dowell scored four touchdowns, including three in the third quarter, in a 48–19 win over DePaul. His four touchdowns were a program record, and the Lubbock Morning Avalanche wrote that his "work resembled a snow-plow in frozen Alaska" as he "rambled down the field, pushing the De Paul secondary out of his way". Dowell was named a first-team all-Border Conference selection. He was also voted into the Chicago Charities College All-Star Game the following year, though he did not play in the exhibition due to being in NFL training camp at the time. Dowell was enshrined in the Texas Tech Athletic Hall of Honor as a member of the class of 1963 alongside his former freshman year coach, Dell Morgan.

== Professional career ==
In March 1935, it was reported that Dowell had drawn interest from several National Football League (NFL) teams, having received contract offers from the Brooklyn Dodgers, the Philadelphia Eagles, and the Pittsburgh Pirates. "As a line plunger, passer and pass receiver, he was a brilliant performer in the Matador lineup," said the Lubbock Morning Avalanche. "A tall, rangy 200-pounder, Dowell is considered an almost perfect football 'type'."

Dowell signed with the Chicago Cardinals that August ahead of the 1935 NFL season. He was one of 14 rookies on the 34-man roster. Dowell made his professional debut in their season opener on September 15, substituting starting fullback Mike Mikulak in a 7–6 win over the Green Bay Packers. He played in five regular season games that season and started one, rushing for four yards on six attempts, primarily in a backup role to Mikulak. The Cardinals finished with a 6–4–2 record. Dowell returned to Texas Tech to finish his degree that offseason, where he served as a boxing instructor and an assistant football coach during spring training.

Dowell returned to the Cardinals for the 1936 NFL season as a converted end. He suffered a broken bone in his hand in their first preseason warm-up game on August 30, starting at left end in a 70–0 win over the semi-pro Kamm Brewers of South Bend, Indiana. Dowell started the final seven regular season games. After starting a pair of games at halfback, he was moved to the starting fullback role after Mikulak switched to quarterback. Dowell made his first start at his new position on November 8, recording a career-high 34 rushing yards on four carries in a 13–0 win over the Philadelphia Eagles – Chicago's first victory of the season. The Chicago Daily Tribune reported that he "played excellent ball" the following week, contributing to a 14–6 win over the Pittsburgh Pirates. Dowell played 10 total regular season games in 1936; he rushed for 151 yards on 54 attempts and completed one-of-two pass attempts for six yards. The Cardinals finished with a 3–8–1 record.

== Post-playing career and military service ==
After two seasons in the NFL, Dowell entered the automobile industry, being hired as a staff adjustor for General Motors in December 1936. He then attended the General Motors Institute of Technology, after which he joined the Kuykendall Chevrolet Company as a salesman in 1938. Dowell returned to Texas Tech as the business manager of athletics in 1939, with the Lubbock Avalanche-Journal stating: "A more popular choice could not have been made at this time." He submitted his resignation in January 1941, on the same day as head football coach Pete Cawthon, assistant football and head basketball coach Berl Huffman, and assistant football coach Dutch Smith. However, Dowell was instead promoted to assistant to the athletic director that March. He was described as "the Babe Ruth of the Tech faculty softball team".

Dowell served in the United States Navy from 1942 to 1945, where he was noted for his "leadership and aggressiveness". He was commissioned an ensign in April 1942. After graduating from a course at the United States Naval Academy, Dowell was assigned to the Naval Air Station Corpus Christi, where he served as the assistant athletic officer and coordinator of the cadet program. He later saw action as a gunnery officer on several aircraft carriers, including the USS Petrof Bay, during the Second Philippines campaign. Dowell was awarded the Legion of Merit for action aboard the aircraft carrier during the Battle off Samar. He participated in a total of six different engagements in his 19 1/2 months oversea and was discharged in November 1945 with the rank of Lieutenant commander.

"For distinguishing himself by exceptionally meritorious conduct in the performance of duties as... an officer of an escort carrier during her action in the Southwest Pacific Area... By his tireless efforts and intelligent and endless thought and training he helped the gunnery officer to maintain batteries in a state of efficiency whereby even in the face of apparent death his gunners coolly and calmly remained at their stations, firing and servicing their guns. His conduct throughout was in keeping with the highest traditions of the Navy of the United States" – citation accompanying his Legion of Merit medal, signed by Thomas C. Kinkaid, then-commander of the Seventh Fleet

Dowell returned to Lubbock and rejoined the Texas Tech athletic department in his role as assistant to the athletic director in January 1946. He was also an assistant coach on the football team for spring training, as well as on the track and field team. Dowell resigned from his post that April to accept a position as sales manager at Fenner Tubbs Company, a Chrysler dealer, where he worked from 1946 to 1950. During this time, he coached the newly-formed Texas Tech football "B" team in 1946, was involved in organizing the Lubbock Golden Gloves tournament, and was elected to the Lubbock school board in 1948, where he served two three-year terms. In early 1950, Dowell partnered with local businessman Eddie Louthan to purchase the Dickinson Motor Company, which they renamed Louthan-Dowell Motors. He went on to own dealerships in Lubbock, Fort Worth, Amarillo, and Austin, and served as national chairman of the Dodge Dealers' Advisory Council as well as chairman of the truck committee of the National Automobile Dealers Association. He also remained heavily involved in Texas Tech athletics, most notably as a member of the athletic council.

== Personal life ==
Dowell married Beth Wulfman on July 3, 1936, in Crosbyton, Texas, although they kept the marriage a secret until after the 1936 NFL season. They had two sons, John and Stephen, and one daughter, Gwynn, and were members of the First Presbyterian church. The couple lived in Fort Worth for 15 years before moving to Richardson, Texas. Dowell died on August 12, 1992, at a hospital in Richardson, one year after his wife's death in 1991. He was buried at Royse City Cemetery in Royse City.

Dowell received his nickname during his freshman season at Texas Tech due to "the mule power [he] developed on the gridiron."
