= Floyd Weaver =

American baseball player (1941–2008)

- Pitcher
- Born: May 12, 1941; Ben Franklin, Texas, U.S.
- Died: November 17, 2008 (aged 67); Paris, Texas, U.S.
- Batted: Right Threw: Right

MLB debut
- September 30, 1962, for the Cleveland Indians

Last MLB appearance
- September 26, 1971, for the Milwaukee Brewers

MLB statistics
- Win–loss record: 4–5
- Earned run average: 5.21
- Strikeouts: 108
- Stats at Baseball Reference

Teams
- Cleveland Indians (1962, 1965); Chicago White Sox (1970); Milwaukee Brewers (1971)

David Floyd Weaver (May 12, 1941 – November 17, 2008) was an American Major League Baseball pitcher who was born in Ben Franklin, Texas. He attended Pecan Gap High School in Pecan Gap, TX then Paris Junior College in Paris, Texas, where he excelled in baseball and basketball. On May 10, 1961, Weaver struck out 21 batters in a nine-inning game at Grand Junction, Colorado, still a collegiate record. Signing with the Cleveland Indians in 1961, he debuted with them on September 30, 1962. He also played with the Indians in 1965, Chicago White Sox in 1970, and Milwaukee Brewers in 1971. Weaver had a 4–5 career record in 85 games. In 155.1 career innings, he allowed 149 hits with an ERA 5.21. Floyd's final game was on September 26, 1971. He batted and threw right-handed and was 6 foot 4.

Weaver died in Paris on November 17, 2008, at age 67.
