= Royse City High School =

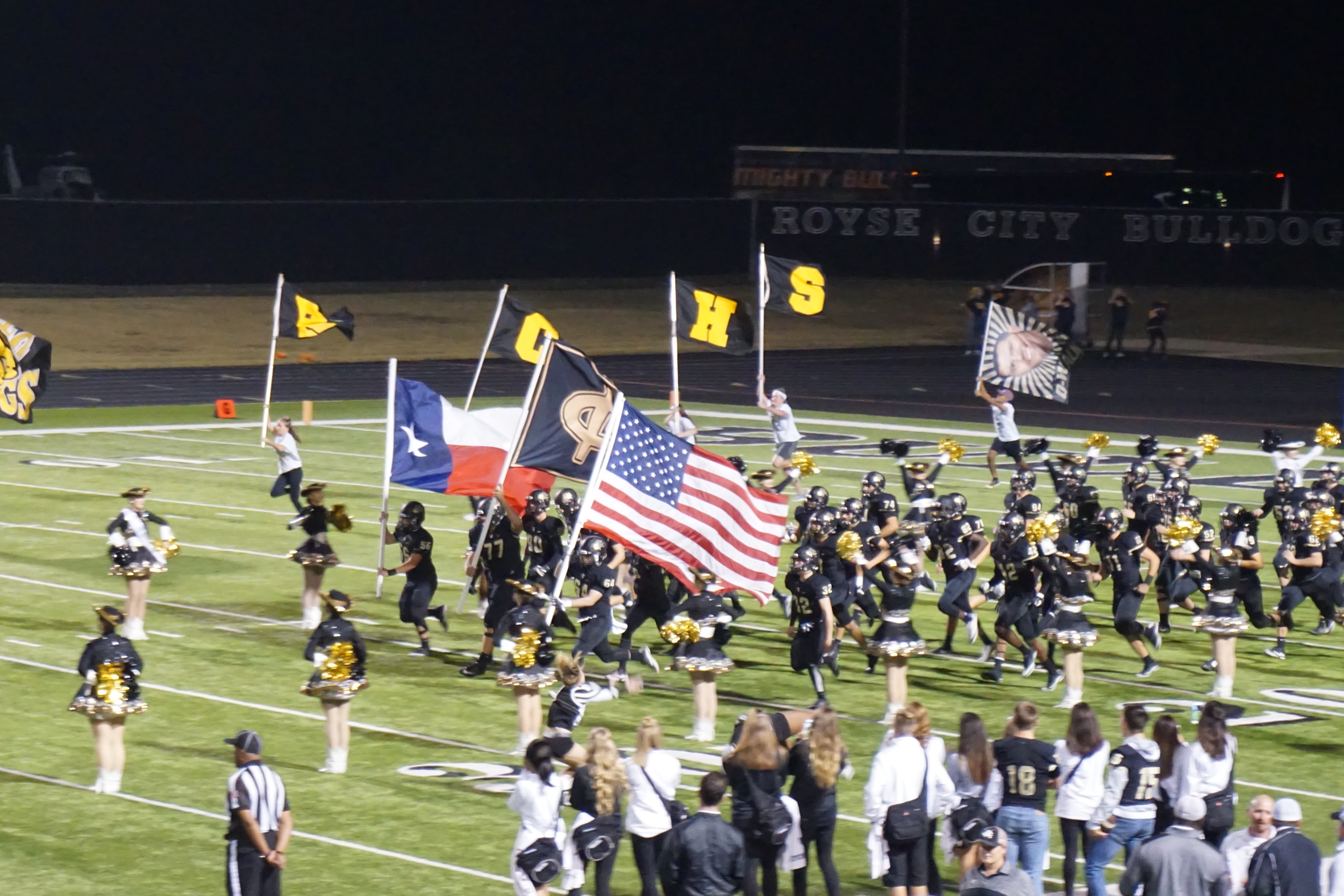
- Royse City Bulldogs football team

Location
- 700 South Farm-to-Market (FM) 2642; Royse City, Texas 75189-0479; United States; 32°58′28.2″N 96°17′27.24″W

Information
- School type: Public high school
- School district: Royse City Independent School District
- Principal: Brooke McMaster
- Staff: 105.69 (FTE)
- Grades: 9–12
- Enrollment: 2,526 (2023-24)
- Student to teacher ratio: 16.58
- Colors: Black & Gold
- Athletics conference: UIL Class AAAAAA
- Nickname: RCHS
- Website: www.rcisd.org/o/rchs

Royse City High School is a public secondary school located in Royse City, Texas, United States and is the only high school in the Royse City Independent School District. The current building opened in the fall of 2006, and is located in the southwestern part of Hunt County. The school serves students from Collin County, Hunt County, and Rockwall County. In 2011, the school was rated "Academically Acceptable" by the Texas Education Agency. The school garnered national attention when a student wore a Confederate flag as a cape on campus, April 23, 2019; subsequently, "white power" was shouted at a black television reporter from a vehicle leaving the school.

== Notable alumni ==
- Mule Dowell, class of 1931 – professional football player for the Chicago Cardinals
- Taylor Hearn, class of 2012 – professional baseball pitcher for the Kansas City Royals
- Tyson Neighbors, class of 2021 – professional baseball pitcher in the Baltimore Orioles organization
