= Taylor Hearn (baseball) =

American baseball player (born 1994)

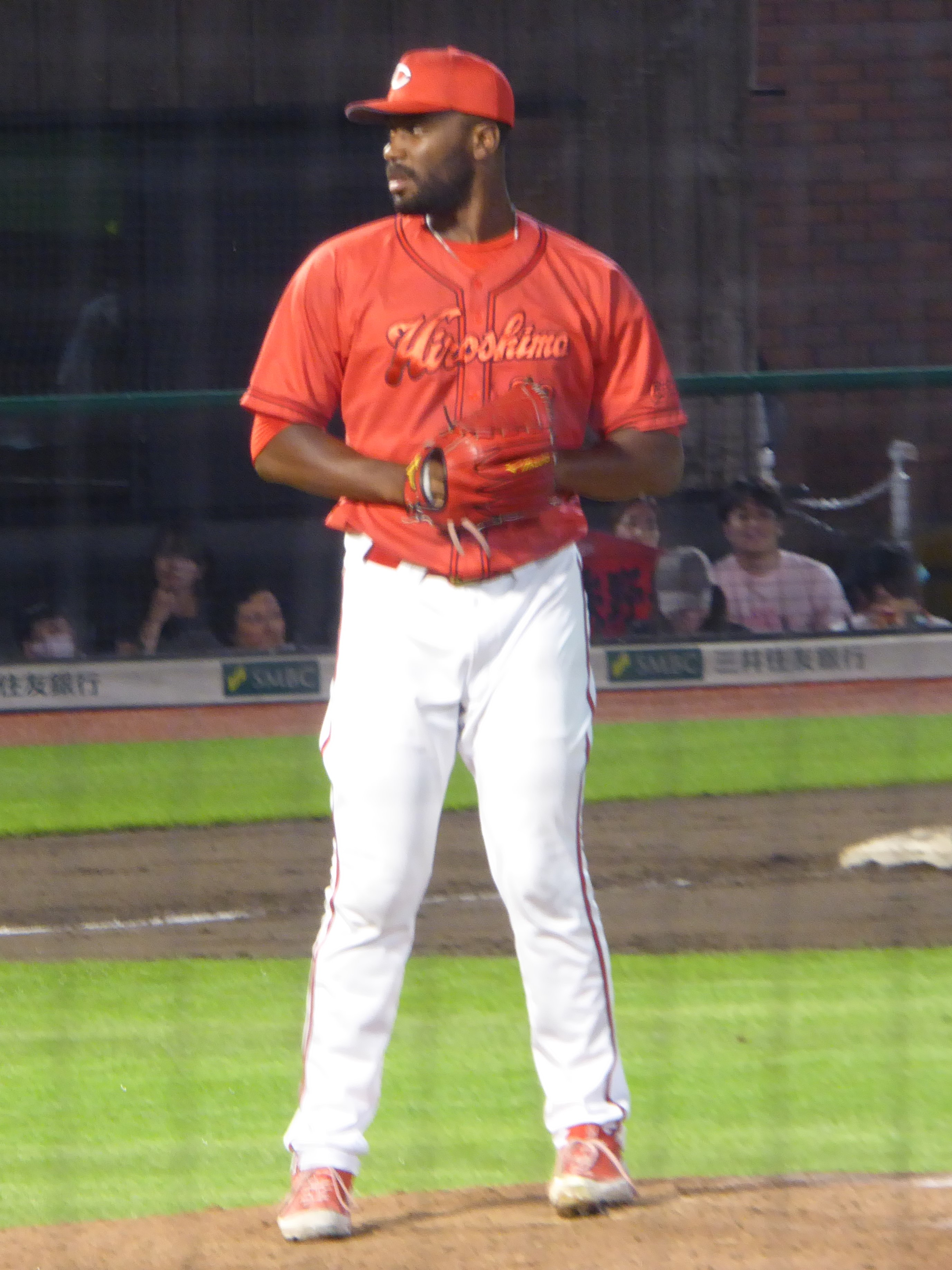
- Hearn with Hiroshima Toyo Carp in 2024

Hiroshima Toyo Carp – No. 68
- Pitcher
- Born: August 30, 1994 (age 32); Royse City, Texas, U.S.
- Bats: Left Throws: Left

Professional debut
- MLB: April 25, 2019, for the Texas Rangers
- NPB: May 29, 2024, for the Hiroshima Toyo Carp

MLB statistics (through 2023 season)
- Win–loss record: 12–15
- Earned run average: 5.35
- Strikeouts: 227

NPB statistics (through August 18, 2026)
- Win–loss record: 3-5
- Earned run average: 2.23
- Strikeouts: 125
- Saves: 11
- Stats at Baseball Reference

Teams
- Texas Rangers (2019–2023); Atlanta Braves (2023); Kansas City Royals (2023); Hiroshima Toyo Carp (2024–present)

Taylor Lynn Hearn (born August 30, 1994) is an American professional baseball pitcher for the Hiroshima Toyo Carp of Nippon Professional Baseball (NPB). He has previously played in Major League Baseball (MLB) for the Texas Rangers, Atlanta Braves, and Kansas City Royals.

== Amateur career ==
Hearn attended Royse City High School in Royse City, Texas. He was drafted after his senior year by the Pittsburgh Pirates in the 22nd round of the 2012 Major League Baseball draft. Rather than sign, Hearn chose to attend San Jacinto College to play college baseball. He was then drafted by the Cincinnati Reds in the 36th round of the 2013 MLB draft, but did not sign. After a second season at San Jacinto, Hearn was drafted by the Minnesota Twins in the 25th round of the 2014 MLB draft. He chose to transfer to Oklahoma Baptist University, an NAIA program, instead of signing. After one year at Oklahoma Baptist, Hearn was drafted by the Washington Nationals in the fifth round of the 2015 MLB draft and signed.

== Professional career ==
=== Washington Nationals ===
Hearn spent the 2015 season with both the rookie GCL Nationals and the Low–A Auburn Doubledays, posting a 1–5 record and a 3.56 earned run average (ERA) in 12 games (11 starts). He began 2016 with the GCL Nationals and was later promoted to the Single–A Hagerstown Suns.

=== Pittsburgh Pirates ===
On July 30, 2016, the Nationals traded Hearn, along with Felipe Vázquez, to the Pittsburgh Pirates for Mark Melancon. He played the rest of the season with their Single–A West Virginia Power. In 18 games (seven starts) pitched between the Nationals, Doubledays, and Suns, he had a 2–1 record with a 2.44 ERA and 75 strikeouts in 51.2 innings. Hearn played the entire 2017 season with the High–A Bradenton Marauders, accumulating a 4–6 record and a 4.12 ERA in 19 games (18 starts). He began 2018 with the Double-A Altoona Curve and was selected for the Eastern League All-Star team.

=== Texas Rangers ===
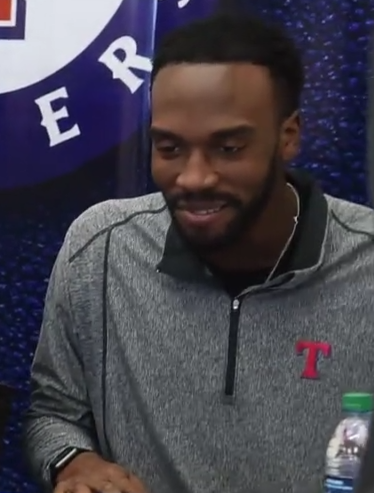
Hearn with the Rangers at Dyess Air Force Base in 2019

Hearn was traded to the Texas Rangers, along with Sherten Apostel, in exchange for Keone Kela on July 30, 2018. He finished the year with the Double-A Frisco RoughRiders. In 24 starts between both clubs, he went 4–8 with a 3.49 ERA. The Rangers added him to their 40-man roster after the season. In 2019, Hearn was optioned to the Triple-A Nashville Sounds to open the season. In 4 games for Nashville, Hearn went 1–3 with a 4.05 ERA and 26 strikeouts over 20 innings.

Hearn was promoted to the Rangers on April 25, 2019, to make his major league debut that night against the Seattle Mariners. He pitched just 1/3 of an inning, allowing five runs (four earned). On April 26, he was placed on the injured list with inflammation in his left elbow. Hearn did not return to game action in 2019, as he suffered a fracture in his elbow during rehabilitation in June. In 2020, Hearn went 0–0 with a 3.63 ERA and 23 strikeouts over 17 1/3 innings for Texas. With Texas in 2021, Hearn went 6–6 with a 4.66 ERA and 92 strikeouts over 114 1/3 innings.

Hearn went 6–8 with a 5.13 ERA and 97 strikeouts over 100 innings in 2022. He bounced between the rotation and bullpen that season, as well as being demoted to the Round Rock Express of the Triple-A Pacific Coast League for three games. On August 21, 2022, Hearn earned his first career save.

On January 13, 2023, Hearn agreed to a one-year, $1.4625 million contract with the Rangers, avoiding salary arbitration. Hearn spent the majority of his time with Round Rock, posting a 3.66 ERA with 54 strikeouts in 39 1/3 innings; in four games for Texas, he struggled to a 10.29 ERA, with seven strikeouts. On July 19, he was designated for assignment by the Rangers following the promotion of Alex Speas.

=== Atlanta Braves ===
On July 24, 2023, the Rangers traded Hearn to the Atlanta Braves in exchange for cash considerations. On July 29, he made his Braves debut, where he struggled, allowing four earned runs in relief. The next day, Hearn was optioned to the Triple-A Gwinnett Stripers.

=== Kansas City Royals ===
On July 30, 2023, the Braves traded Hearn to the Kansas City Royals in exchange for Nicky Lopez. On August 8, Hearn was promoted to the major leagues, and he made his Royals debut two days later, pitching an inning in relief, allowing one hit and no runs. In 8 games for the Royals, he struggled to an 8.22 ERA with 8 strikeouts in 7 2/3 innings pitched. Following the season on October 26, Hearn was removed from the 40–man roster and sent outright to the Triple–A Omaha Storm Chasers. However, Hearn subsequently rejected the assignment and elected free agency.

=== Hiroshima Toyo Carp ===
On December 3, 2023, Hearn signed with the Hiroshima Toyo Carp of Nippon Professional Baseball. He made 35 appearances for Hiroshima in 2024, recording a 1.29 ERA with 26 strikeouts across 35 innings pitched.

On November 8, 2024, Hearn re–signed with the Carp on a one–year contract.

On December 17, 2025, Hearn re-signed with the Carp for the 2026 season.

== Personal life ==
Hearn is a Christian. Hearn's grandfather Cleo, father Robby, and three uncles are all former rodeo cowboys. Hearn participated in rodeos growing up from the age 4 through age 17.

Hearn's high school number 21 was retired by Royse City High School in 2017.
