= Mobile City, Texas =

- City
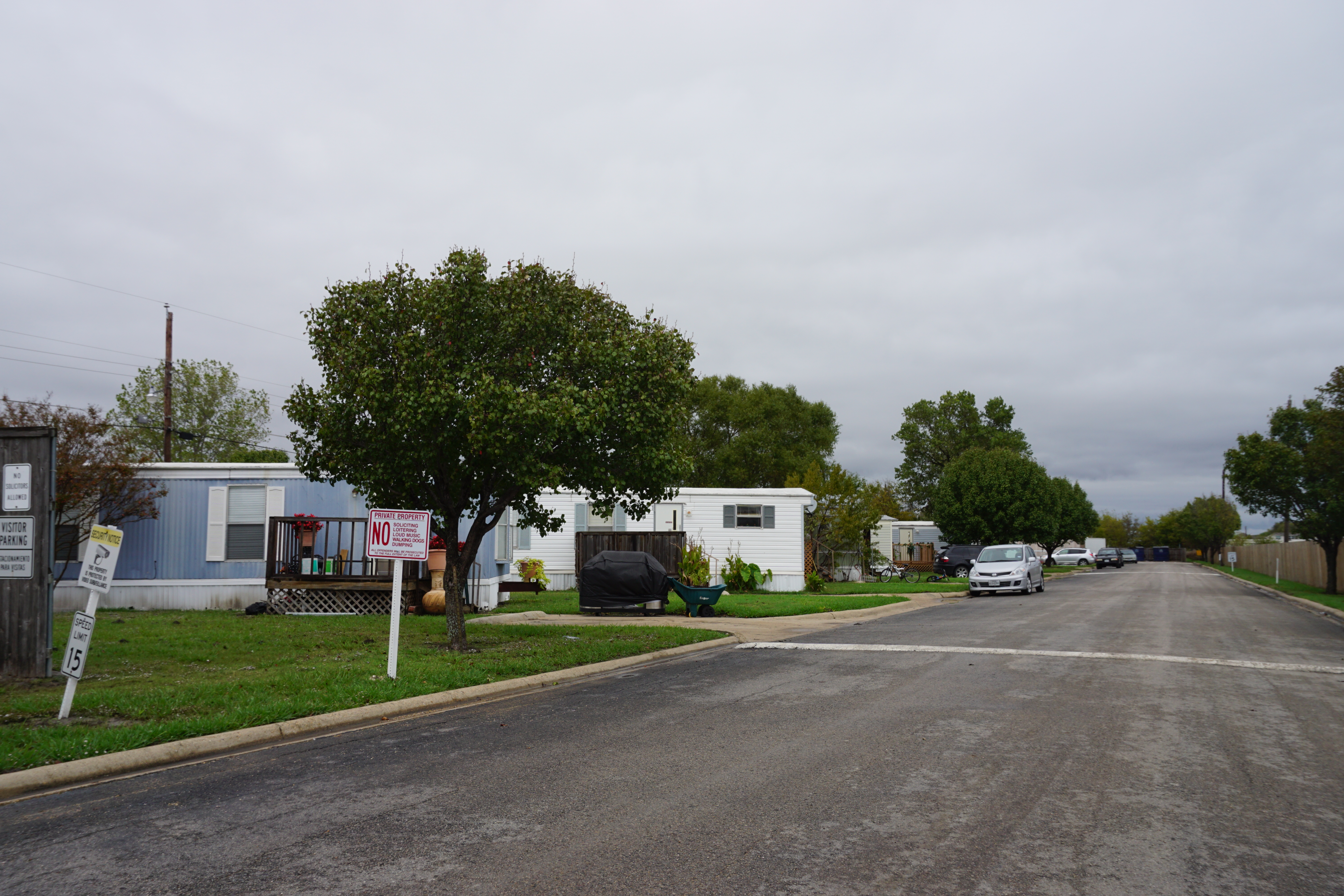
- Ivey Lane in Mobile City

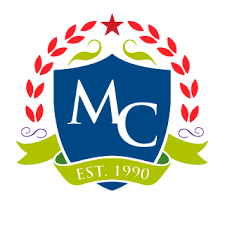
- Seal

- Location of Mobile City in Rockwall County, Texas
- Coordinates: 32°55′22″N 96°24′40″W
- Country: United States
- State: Texas
- County: Rockwall

Area
  - Total: 0.015 sq mi (0.04 km^{2})
  - Land: 0.015 sq mi (0.04 km^{2})
  - Water: 0 sq mi (0.00 km^{2})
- Elevation: 591 ft (180 m)

Population (2020)
  - Total: 142
  - Density: 13,928.6/sq mi (5,377.86/km^{2})
- Time zone: UTC-6 (CST)
  - Summer (DST): UTC-5 (CDT)
- Area codes: 214, 469, 945, 972
- FIPS code: 48-48858
- GNIS feature ID: 2411129

Mobile City is a city in Rockwall County, Texas, United States on the outskirts of Rockwall. The population was 142 at the 2020 census.

== History ==
Originally a mobile home park outside of city limits, it was incorporated on January 25, 1990 so that a beer, wine, and liquor store could open. After incorporation, the roads through the park were paved for the first time and full-time security was provided to the residents at no charge to them. Until fall 2007 it was the only city within Rockwall County that allowed alcohol sales (excluding restaurants).

== Geography ==
According to the United States Census Bureau, the city has a total area of 0.02 square miles (0.052 km^{2}), all land.

== Demographics ==
Historical population
Census	Pop.	Note	%±
2000	196		—
2010	188		−4.1%
2020	142		−24.5%
U.S. Decennial Census

=== 2020 census ===
As of the 2020 census, Mobile City had a population of 142. The median age was 24.5 years. 40.8% of residents were under the age of 18 and 2.1% of residents were 65 years of age or older. For every 100 females there were 108.8 males, and for every 100 females age 18 and over there were 90.9 males age 18 and over.

100.0% of residents lived in urban areas, while 0.0% lived in rural areas.

There were 41 households in Mobile City, of which 70.7% had children under the age of 18 living in them. Of all households, 34.1% were married-couple households, 29.3% were households with a male householder and no spouse or partner present, and 26.8% were households with a female householder and no spouse or partner present. About 7.3% of all households were made up of individuals and 0.0% had someone living alone who was 65 years of age or older.

There were 59 housing units, of which 30.5% were vacant. The homeowner vacancy rate was 0.0% and the rental vacancy rate was 23.4%.

Racial composition as of the 2020 census
Race	Number	Percent
White	32	22.5%
Black or African American	0	0.0%
American Indian and Alaska Native	1	0.7%
Asian	0	0.0%
Native Hawaiian and Other Pacific Islander	0	0.0%
Some other race	47	33.1%
Two or more races	62	43.7%
Hispanic or Latino (of any race)	113	79.6%

=== 2010 census ===
As of the census of 2010, there were 188 people, 55 households, and 41 families residing in the city. The population density was 11,911.3 inhabitants per square mile (4,599.0/km^{2}). There were 60 housing units at an average density of 3,646.3 per square mile (1,407.8/km^{2}). The racial makeup of the city was 53.7% White, 1.6% African American, 0.51% Native American, 48.5% from other races, and 3.2% from two or more races. Hispanic or Latino of any race were 77.7% of the population.

There were 57 households, out of which 61.4% had children under the age of 18 living with them, 52.6% were married couples living together, 19.3% had a female householder with no husband present, and 14.0% were non-families. 8.8% of all households were made up of individuals, and none had someone living alone who was 65 years of age or older. The average household size was 3.44 and the average family size was 3.49.

In the city, the population was spread out, with 39.3% under the age of 18, 16.3% from 18 to 24, 38.3% from 25 to 44, 5.6% from 45 to 64, and 0.5% who were 65 years of age or older. The median age was 22 years. For every 100 females, there were 120.2 males. For every 100 females age 18 and over, there were 120.4 males.

The median income for a household in the city was $28,654, and the median income for a family was $28,365. Males had a median income of $27,656 versus $16,696 for females. The per capita income for the city was $8,521. None of the families and 1.2% of the population were living below the poverty line.

== Education ==
Mobile City is served by the Rockwall Independent School District.
