= First Methodist Church of Rockwall =

Historic church in Texas, United States

- U.S. National Register of Historic Places
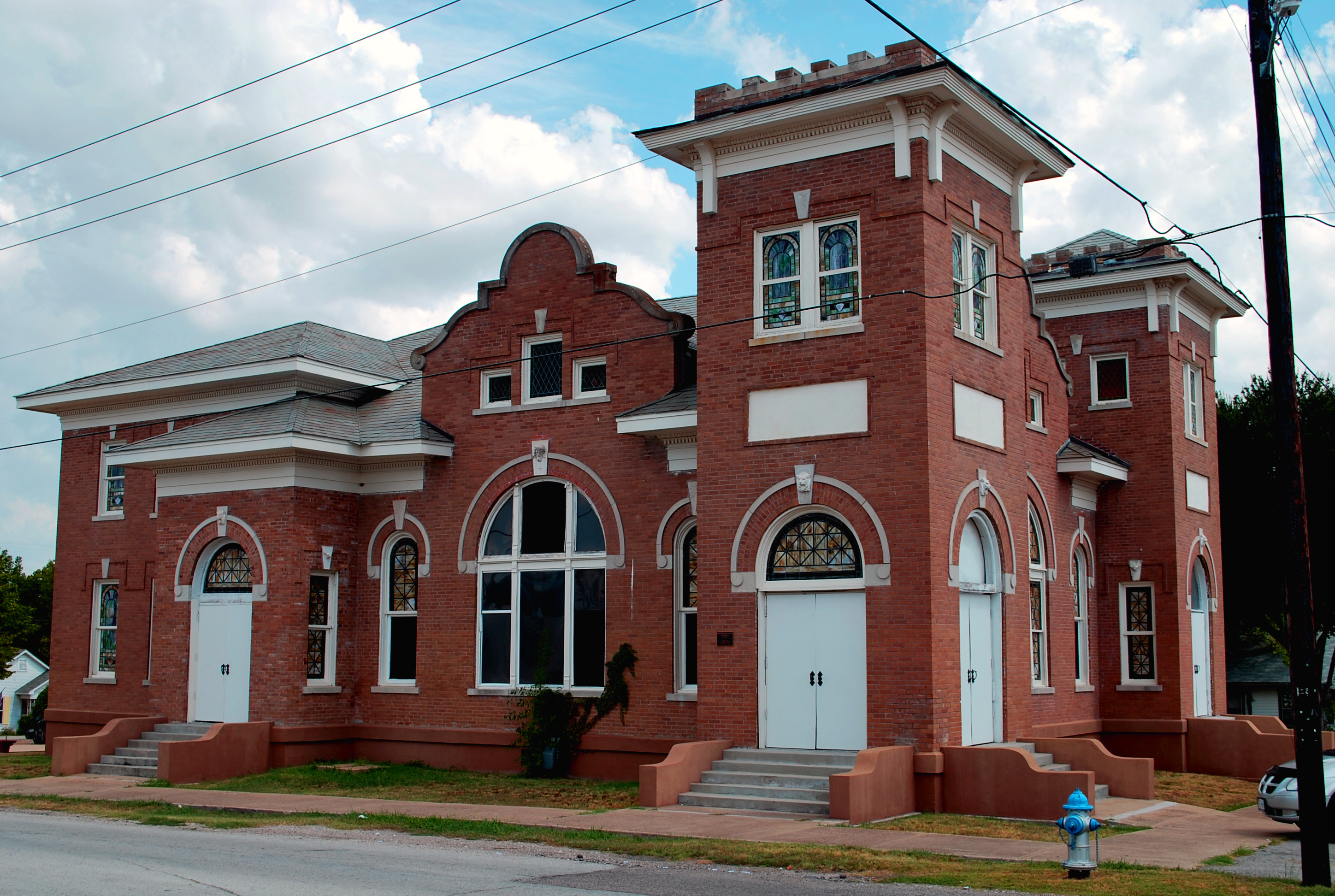
- First Methodist Church in 2013

- Location within Texas Location within the United States
- Location: 303 E. Rusk, Rockwall, Texas
- Coordinates: 32°55′51″N 96°27′29″W
- Area: less than one acre
- Built: 1913
- Built by: Harris & Shuman
- Architect: George Lindsey
- Architectural style: Mission Revival
- NRHP reference No.: 07000691
- Added to NRHP: July 11, 2007

First Methodist Church of Rockwall is a historic church at 303 E. Rusk in downtown Rockwall, Texas. The church was built in 1913 for Rockwall's Methodist congregation, which formed in 1856 and had previously met in a wooden church building. Architect George Lindsey of Greenville designed the Mission Revival building, which cost the congregation over $15,000. The one-and-a-half story brick building features two square towers on the southern corners, curved Mission-style parapets atop the south and west facades, and round arched doors and windows. The church's original interior followed the Akron Plan, in which the Sunday school space allowed for both large all-school gatherings and smaller classes based on age.

The church was added to the National Register of Historic Places in 2007.

== See also ==
- National Register of Historic Places listings in Rockwall County, Texas
- Recorded Texas Historic Landmarks in Rockwall County
