= Royse City Lodge No. 663 A.F. & A.M. =

- U.S. National Register of Historic Places
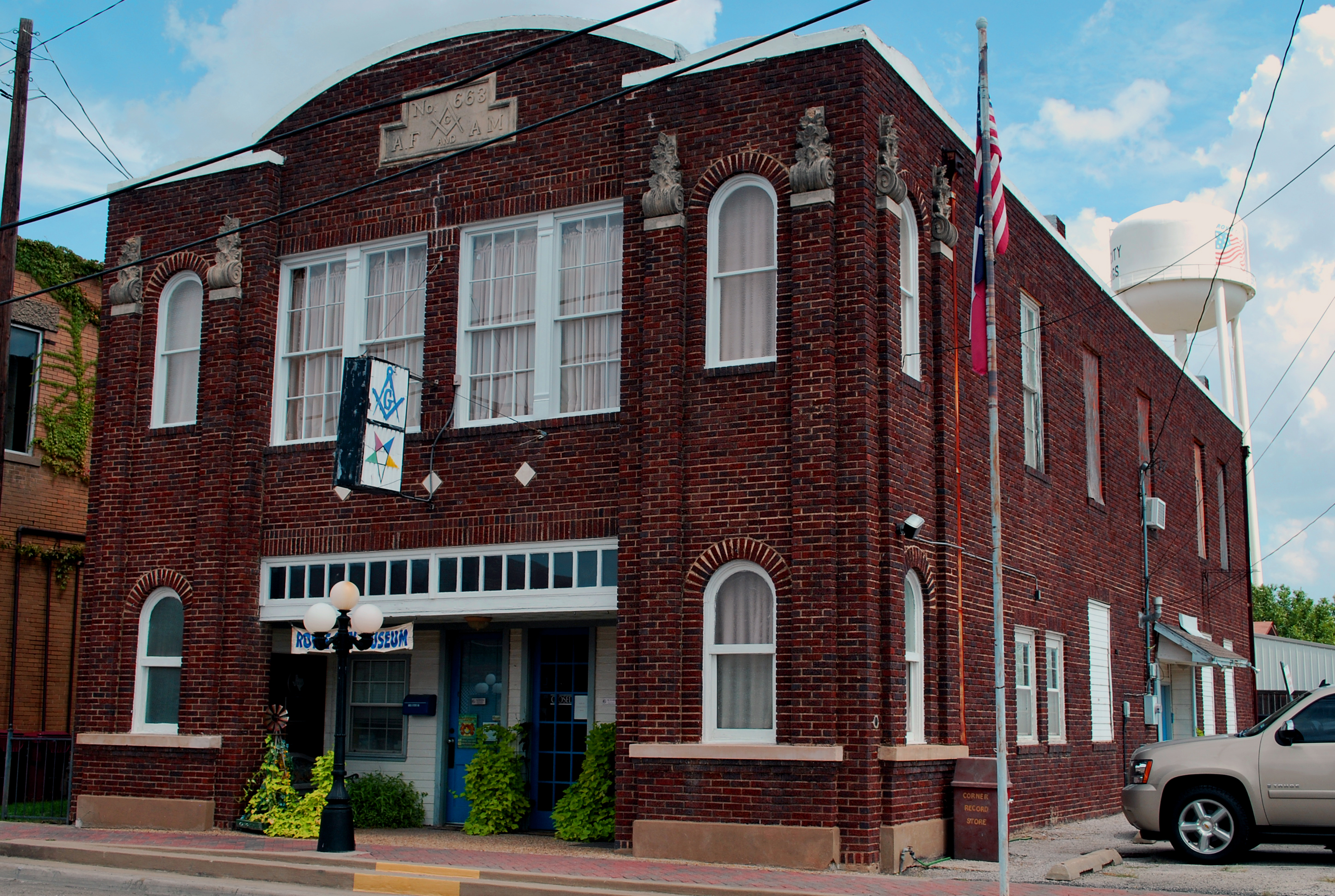

- Location within Texas Location within the United States
- Location: 102 S. Arch St., Royse City, Texas
- Coordinates: 32°58′30″N 96°19′50″W
- Area: less than one acre
- Built: 1925
- Built by: Harris, J. E.
- Architect: Kimzey, W. A.
- Architectural style: Bungalow/craftsman
- NRHP reference No.: 94001242
- Added to NRHP: October 28, 1994

The Royse City Lodge No. 663 A.F. & A.M. is a historic Freemasonry lodge group and also the name of its historic building, at 102 S. Arch St. in Royse City, Texas. The building, built in 1925, was listed on the National Register of Historic Places in 1994.

The lodge group first met in 1888.

The building has also served as the Royse City City Hall. It is a two-story brick building with Mission Revival architectural influences.

The importance of the building in the community is described emphatically in its NRHP nomination:

The Lodge also has a long and respected history in Royse City, Texas. Every citizen of Royse City has utilized the building for some purpose, either fraternal or political. Many of the other buildings were destroyed in a devastating fire in the 1930s and this building, in its dual role, has served the needs of every citizen of Royse City for three-quarters of a century. No other building has greater significance to the community or has been occupied by the original owners since construction.

It is a Recorded Texas Historic Landmark.
