= Ben Franklin, Texas =

- Unincorporated community
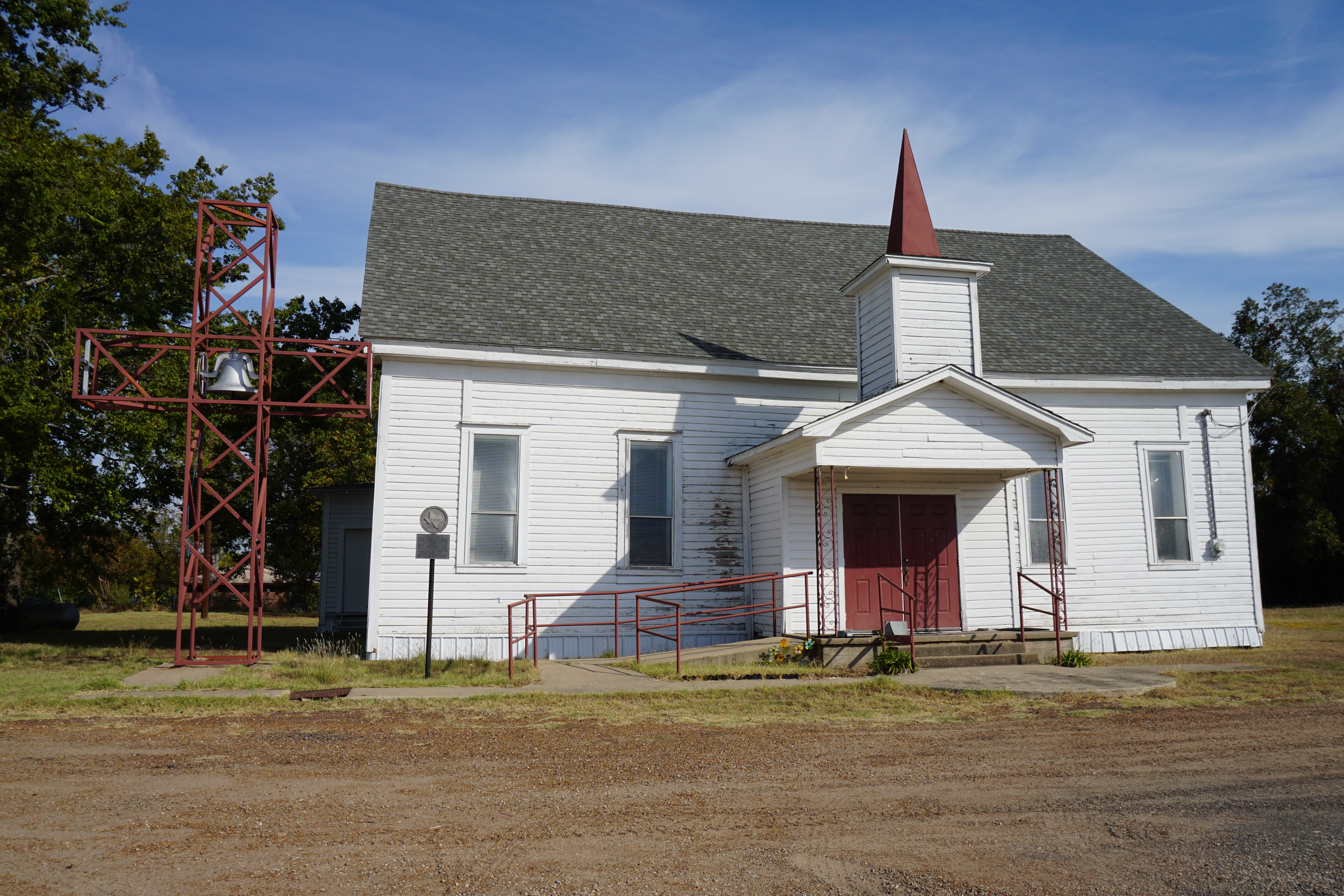
- Ben Franklin United Methodist Church in October 2015

- Location within Texas Location within the United States
- Coordinates: 33°28′36″N 95°46′08″W
- Country: United States
- State: Texas
- County: Delta
- Elevation: 486 ft (148 m)
- Time zone: UTC-6 (Central (CST))
  - Summer (DST): UTC-5 (CDT)
- Postal code: 75415
- Area codes: 903 & 430
- GNIS feature ID: 1351867

Ben Franklin is an unincorporated community in Delta County, Texas, United States. According to the Handbook of Texas, the community had a population of 75 in 2000.

== History ==
The population was 75 in 2010 and 2017.

The local Methodist church was listed on the National Register of Historic Places.

On April 2, 1957, an F2 tornado destroyed six homes and damaged several others in Ben Franklin. Two people were injured and losses totaled $25,000. This and a previous event may have belonged to the same family. Grazulis listed the tornado as the same as the Ambia–Harmon F2s, considering all three to be a 30-mile-long (48 km) F3 event. One death was reported.

== Geography ==
Ben Franklin is located at the intersection of Farm to Market Roads 38 and 128 on the Atchison, Topeka and Santa Fe Railway, 4 mi (6.4 km) northeast of Pecan Gap, 11 mi (18 km) north of Cooper, 16 mi (26 km) southwest of Paris, and 77 mi (124 km) northeast of Dallas in northwestern Delta County.

== Notable person ==
- Mule Dowell, NFL player
- Floyd Weaver, Major League Baseball pitcher.
