= Rockwall County, Texas =

County in Texas, United States

- County
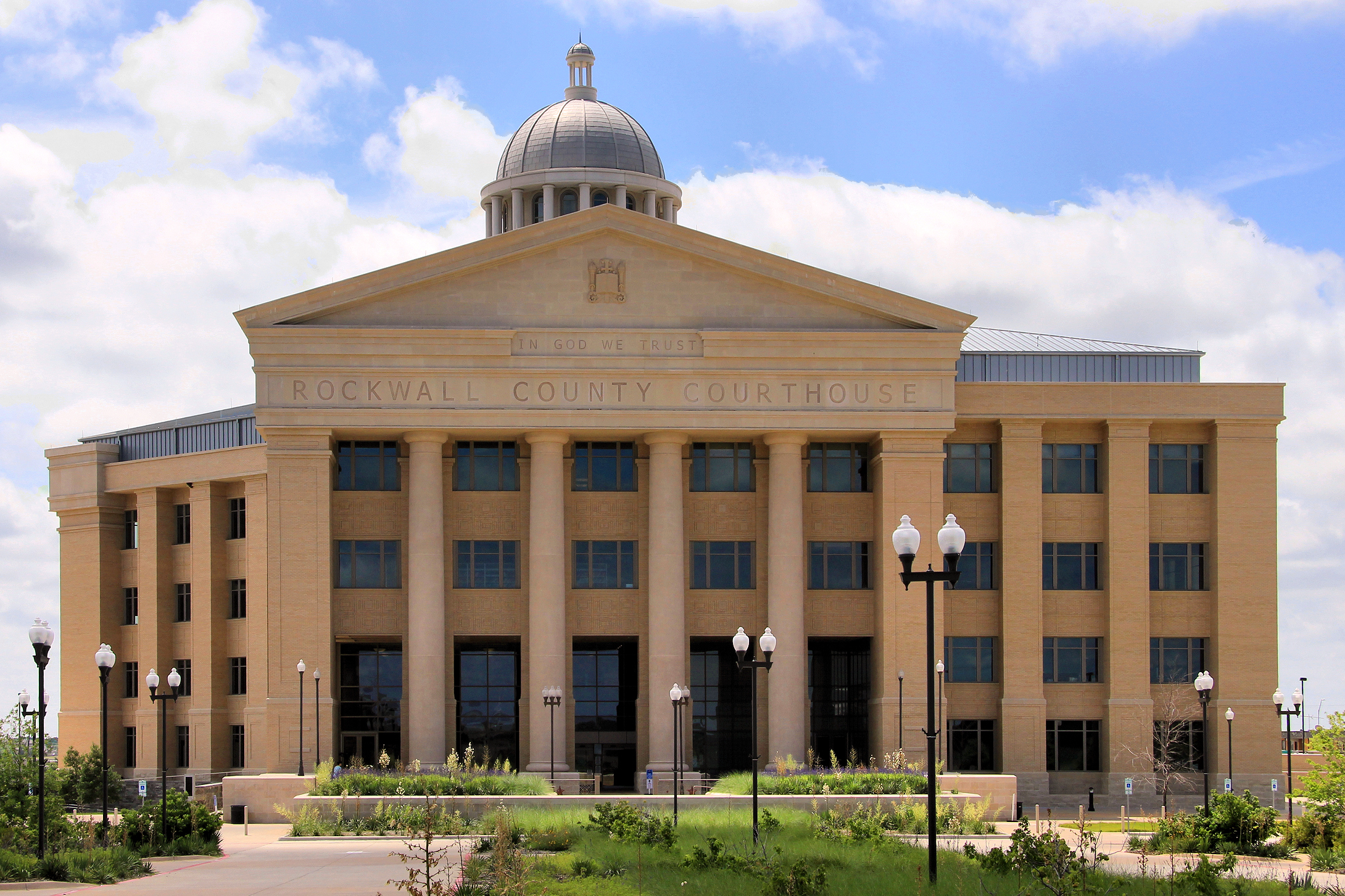
- The Rockwall County Courthouse in Rockwall

- Seal

- Location within the U.S. state of Texas
- Coordinates: 32.899886°N 96.41205°W
- Country: United States
- State: Texas
- Founded: March 1, 1873
- Named for: Rockwall, Texas, named in turn for its clastic dikes
- Seat: Rockwall
- Largest city: Rockwall

Government
  - County judge: Frank New

Area
  - Total: 148.933 sq mi (385.73 km^{2})
  - Land: 127.210 sq mi (329.47 km^{2})
  - Water: 21.723 sq mi (56.26 km^{2}) 14.59%

Population (2020)
  - Total: 107,819
  - Estimate (2025): 140,738 ▲
  - Density: 1,077.44/sq mi (416.00/km^{2})
- Demonym: Rockwallian
- Time zone: UTC−6 (Central)
  - Summer (DST): UTC−5 (CDT)
- Congressional district: 4th
- Website: www.rockwallcountytexas.com

Rockwall County is a county in the U.S. state of Texas. As of the 2020 census, its population was 107,819; it was estimated to be 140,738 in 2025. Its county seat is Rockwall and both the county and city are named for a wall-like subterranean rock formation that runs throughout the county. Rockwall County is part of the Dallas–Fort Worth–Arlington metropolitan statistical area. It was one of the 25 fastest-growing counties in the U.S. in 2009. Rockwall County is listed as the wealthiest county in Texas and the 17th-wealthiest in the United States by median household income. Cities in Rockwall County include Rockwall, Heath, Royse City, Fate, McClendon-Chisholm, Mobile City, and part of Rowlett.

== History ==
Rockwall County was formed in 1873 from portions of Kaufman County. It split off because access to the county seat of Kaufman was inconvenient. It was named for its county seat, Rockwall. Rockwall County also is home to the great rock wall, which is no longer in public view today.

== Geography ==
According to the United States Census Bureau, the county has a total area of 148.933 square miles (385.73 km^{2}), of which 127.210 square miles (329.47 km^{2}) is land and 21.723 square miles (56.26 km^{2}) (14.59%) is water. It is the smallest county by area in Texas.

=== Major highways ===
- Interstate 30 / U.S. Route 67
- State Highway 66
- State Highway 205
- State Highway 276

=== Lake ===
- Lake Ray Hubbard

=== Adjacent counties ===
- Collin County (north)
- Hunt County (east)
- Kaufman County (south)
- Dallas County (west)

== Demographics ==
Historical population
Census	Pop.	Note	%±
1880	2,984		—
1890	5,972		100.1%
1900	8,531		42.8%
1910	8,072		−5.4%
1920	8,591		6.4%
1930	7,658		−10.9%
1940	7,051		−7.9%
1950	6,156		−12.7%
1960	5,878		−4.5%
1970	7,046		19.9%
1980	14,528		106.2%
1990	25,604		76.2%
2000	43,080		68.3%
2010	78,337		81.8%
2020	107,819		37.6%
2025 (est.)	140,738	▲	30.5%
U.S. Decennial Census; 1790–1960 1900–1990; 1990–2000 2010–2020

As of the third quarter of 2024, the median home value in Rockwall County was $438,970.

As of the 2023 American Community Survey, there are 39,513 estimated households in Rockwall County with an average of 2.94 persons per household. The county has a median household income of $124,917. Approximately 5.1% of the county's population lives at or below the poverty line. Rockwall County has an estimated 70.1% employment rate, with 44.0% of the population holding a bachelor's degree or higher and 94.2% holding a high school diploma.

The top five reported ancestries (people were allowed to report up to two ancestries, thus the figures will generally add to more than 100%) were English (81.5%), Spanish (12.1%), Indo-European (2.7%), Asian and Pacific Islander (1.9%), and Other (1.8%).

=== Racial and ethnic composition ===
Note: the US Census treats Hispanic/Latino as an ethnic category. This table excludes Latinos from the racial categories and assigns them to a separate category. Hispanics/Latinos may be of any race.

Race / ethnicity (NH = non-Hispanic)	Pop. 1980	Pop. 1990	Pop. 2000	Pop. 2010	Pop. 2020
White alone (NH)	13,241 (91.14%)	22,981 (89.76%)	35,817 (83.14%)	58,046 (74.10%)	70,198 (65.11%)
Black or African American alone (NH)	712 (4.90%)	851 (3.32%)	1,374 (3.19%)	4,397 (5.61%)	8,179 (7.59%)
Native American or Alaska Native alone (NH)	21 (0.14%)	99 (0.39%)	143 (0.33%)	345 (0.44%)	479 (0.44%)
Asian alone (NH)	47 (0.32%)	159 (0.62%)	555 (1.29%)	1,850 (2.36%)	3,306 (3.07%)
Pacific Islander alone (NH)	—	—	14 (0.03%)	47 (0.06%)	75 (0.07%)
Other race alone (NH)	19 (0.13%)	14 (0.05%)	31 (0.07%)	116 (0.15%)	344 (0.32%)
Mixed race or multiracial (NH)	—	—	375 (0.87%)	1,066 (1.36%)	4,678 (4.34%)
Hispanic or Latino (any race)	488 (3.36%)	1,500 (5.86%)	4,771 (11.07%)	12,470 (15.92%)	20,560 (19.07%)
Total	14,528 (100.00%)	25,604 (100.00%)	43,080 (100.00%)	78,337 (100.00%)	107,819 (100.00%)

=== 2023 estimate ===
As of the 2023 estimate, there were 131,307 people and 39,513 households residing in the county. There were 46,258 housing units. The racial makeup of the county was 81.9% White (81,542 or 62.1% NH White), 10.5% African American (12,999 or 9.9% NH Black), 0.9% Native American (657 or 0.5% NH Native), 4.0% Asian (4,990 or 3.8% NH Asian), 0.1% Pacific Islander (131 or 0.1% NH Pacific Islander), _% from some other races and 2.5% from two or more races (2,757 or 2.1% NH Multiracial). Hispanic or Latino people of any race were 28,231 or 21.5% of the population.

=== 2020 census ===
As of the 2020 census, there were 107,819 people, 36,326 households, and 29,255 families residing in the county. The population density was 847.6 inhabitants per square mile (327.3/km^{2}).

As of the 2020 census, the median age was 37.8 years. 27.2% of residents were under the age of 18 and 13.3% of residents were 65 years of age or older. For every 100 females there were 96.2 males, and for every 100 females age 18 and over there were 93.2 males age 18 and over.

The 2020 census found that 86.3% of residents lived in urban areas, while 13.7% lived in rural areas.

In 2020, 42.6% of households had children under the age of 18 living in them. Of all households, 65.8% were married-couple households, 11.1% were households with a male householder and no spouse or partner present, and 18.8% were households with a female householder and no spouse or partner present. About 16.1% of all households were made up of individuals and 7.2% had someone living alone who was 65 years of age or older.

As of 2020, there were 38,219 housing units at an average density of 300.4 per square mile (116.0/km^{2}), of which 5.0% were vacant. Among occupied housing units, 80.8% were owner-occupied and 19.2% were renter-occupied. The homeowner vacancy rate was 2.1% and the rental vacancy rate was 8.5%.

According to the census, in 2020 the racial makeup of the county was 69.5% White, 7.8% Black or African American, 0.8% American Indian and Alaska Native, 3.1% Asian, 0.1% Native Hawaiian and Pacific Islander, 6.2% from some other race, and 12.5% from two or more races. Hispanic or Latino residents of any race comprised 19.1% of the population.

=== 2010 census ===
As of the 2010 census, there were 78,337 people, 26,466 households, and _ families residing in the county. The population density was 616.7 inhabitants per square mile (238.1/km^{2}). There were 27,957 housing units at an average density of 220.1 per square mile (85.0/km^{2}). The racial makeup of the county was 83.68% White, 5.79% African American, 0.60% Native American, 2.42% Asian, 0.07% Pacific Islander, 5.43% from some other races and 2.08% from two or more races. Hispanic or Latino people of any race were 15.92% of the population.

=== 2000 census ===
As of the 2000 census, there were 43,080 people, 14,530 households, and 11,972 families residing in the county. The population density was 334.0 inhabitants per square mile (129.0/km^{2}). There were 15,351 housing units at an average density of 119.0 per square mile (45.9/km^{2}). The racial makeup of the county was 89.17% White, 3.24% African American, 0.40% Native American, 1.32% Asian, 0.05% Pacific Islander, 4.45% from some other races and 1.37% from two or more races. Hispanic or Latino people of any race were 11.07% of the population.

== Communities ==
- Dallas (mostly in Dallas County with small parts in Collin, Denton, Kaufman and Rockwall counties)
- Fate
- Heath (small part in Kaufman County)
- McLendon-Chisholm
- Mobile City
- Rockwall (county seat)
- Rowlett (mostly in Dallas County)
- Royse City (partly in Collin and Hunt counties)
- Wylie (mostly in Collin County and a small part in Dallas County)

== Education ==
These school districts serve Rockwall County:

- Rockwall Independent School District (small portion in Kaufman County) In Rockwall ISD there are 16 Elementary schools, 4 middle schools, 2 freshmen centers, and 2 high schools.
- Royse City Independent School District (small portion in Collin and Hunt Counties)

From 1997 to 2015, the number of non-Hispanic white children in K-12 schools in the county increased by 6,000 as part of a trend of white flight and suburbanization by non-Hispanic white families.

Collin College's official service area includes all of Rockwall County.

== Politics ==
Prior to 1972, Rockwall County was a Democratic stronghold. The 1968 election was highly transitional for the county, with Hubert Humphrey only winning with 39% of the vote due to the strong third-party candidacy of George Wallace. From 1972 on, the county has become a Republican stronghold. George H. W. Bush in 1992 has been the only Republican to fail to win a majority in the county since then, as the strong third-party candidacy of Ross Perot that year led him to a second-place finish in the county over national winner Bill Clinton. However, the county was represented in Congress by a Democrat as late as January 2004, when Representative and Rockwall resident Ralph Hall, a conservative Democrat, switched parties and became a Republican.

In recent years, as the Dallas-Fort Worth Metro area continues to grow and spill over into neighboring counties, the county's strong Republican bent has slightly lessened. Native son George W. Bush received almost 79% of the vote in 2004 while more recent Republican candidates have tended to receive about 70%.

Rockwall County is located within District 33 of the Texas House of Representatives. Rockwall County is located within District 2 of the Texas Senate.

=== Local government ===
Rockwall County is divided into four precincts, each represented by a county commissioner.

As of the most recent elections in 2020, all four commissioners are Republicans.

United States presidential election results for Rockwall County, Texas
Year	Republican		Democratic		Third party(ies)	
Year	No.	%	No.	%	No.	%
1912	0	0.00%	642	95.82%	28	4.18%
1916	27	3.10%	828	94.95%	17	1.95%
1920	104	10.46%	873	87.83%	17	1.71%
1924	93	6.32%	1,371	93.20%	7	0.48%
1928	289	25.37%	850	74.63%	0	0.00%
1932	62	4.77%	1,237	95.23%	0	0.00%
1936	26	2.18%	1,168	97.74%	1	0.08%
1940	95	5.92%	1,510	94.08%	0	0.00%
1944	98	7.22%	1,153	84.90%	107	7.88%
1948	117	9.35%	947	75.64%	188	15.02%
1952	602	33.73%	1,175	65.83%	8	0.45%
1956	657	41.50%	920	58.12%	6	0.38%
1960	652	41.19%	917	57.93%	14	0.88%
1964	445	25.36%	1,305	74.36%	5	0.28%
1968	614	31.09%	778	39.39%	583	29.52%
1972	1,890	75.06%	610	24.23%	18	0.71%
1976	2,087	53.02%	1,828	46.44%	21	0.53%
1980	4,036	65.27%	1,985	32.10%	163	2.64%
1984	6,688	80.11%	1,639	19.63%	22	0.26%
1988	7,214	72.58%	2,659	26.75%	66	0.66%
1992	6,427	48.44%	2,397	18.06%	4,445	33.50%
1996	8,319	65.01%	3,289	25.70%	1,188	9.28%
2000	13,666	77.42%	3,642	20.63%	344	1.95%
2004	20,120	78.65%	5,320	20.80%	141	0.55%
2008	23,300	72.45%	8,492	26.40%	370	1.15%
2012	27,113	75.81%	8,120	22.70%	531	1.48%
2016	28,451	70.81%	9,655	24.03%	2,074	5.16%
2020	36,726	67.97%	16,412	30.38%	891	1.65%
2024	43,542	69.93%	18,092	29.05%	635	1.02%

United States Senate election results for Rockwall County, Texas1
Year	Republican		Democratic		Third party(ies)	
Year	No.	%	No.	%	No.	%
2024	41,726	66.96%	19,466	31.24%	1,127	1.81%

United States Senate election results for Rockwall County, Texas2
Year	Republican		Democratic		Third party(ies)	
Year	No.	%	No.	%	No.	%
2020	37,584	69.88%	15,009	27.91%	1,189	2.21%

Texas Gubernatorial election results for Rockwall County
Year	Republican		Democratic		Third party(ies)	
Year	No.	%	No.	%	No.	%
2022	30,211	70.43%	12,132	28.28%	550	1.28%

== See also ==
- List of museums in North Texas
- National Register of Historic Places listings in Rockwall County, Texas
- Recorded Texas Historic Landmarks in Rockwall County
- Texas locations by per capita income
