= Royse City Independent School District =

School district in Texas

Location
- 810 E Old Greenville Rd, Royse City, Texas 75189 USA
- Coordinates: 32°58′15.9″N 96°19′24.53″W

District information
- Type: Public
- Motto: Educating kids with passion, perseverance, and pride.
- Grades: PK-12
- Superintendent: Kevin Worthy

Other information
- Website: Royse City ISD

Royse City Independent School District is a public school district based in Royse City, Texas (USA). The district lies in eastern Rockwall County, and extends into parts of Collin and Hunt counties.

The district's superintendent is Kevin Worthy, formerly of Gunter, Texas, who was chosen on March 27, 2012 and started work on May 7, 2012. He replaced former superintendent Randy Hancock, who retired in June 2012.

In 2009, the school district was rated "academically acceptable" by the Texas Education Agency.

== Schools ==
Secondary Schools
School Name	Mascot	Colors	Grades	Founded	Location	Additional Information
Royse City High School	Bulldogs	Black & Vegas	9-12		Royse City	Current campus opened in 2006.
Ouida Baley Middle School	Bulldogs	Black & Vegas	6-8		Royse City	Formerly Royse City MS until 2020.
Bobby Summers Middle School	Bulldogs	Blue & Vegas	6-8	2022	Fate	Mascot will change once Worthy Fate HS opens.

Primary Schools
School Name	Colors	Grades	Founded	Location	Additional Information
Glenda Arnold Early Learning Childhood Center	Purple & Vegas	PK	2022	Royse City	
Ruth Cherry Elementary	Red & Vegas	K-5	2009	Royse City	Former intermediate school; New campus opened in 2022; Grades 5-6 (2009-20), PK-5 (2020-22), K-5 (2022-current)
Davis Elementary	Blue & Vegas	K-5	2001	Royse City	
W.R. Fort Elementary	Light Blue & Vegas	K-5	2004	Royse City	
Harry H. Herndon Elementary	Purple & Vegas	K-5	2009	Fate	Former intermediate school; Grades 5-6 (2009-20), PK-5 (2020-22), K-5 (2022-current)
Sara Moss Elementary	Light Purple & Vegas	K-5	2025	Royse City	
Anita Scott Elementary	Burgandy & Vegas	K-5	2002	Royse City	
Miss May Vernon Elementary	Forest Green & Vegas	K-5	2007	Fate	
Paula Walker Elementary	Teal & Vegas	K-5	2024	Royse City	

Future Schools
School Name	Grades	Scheduled Opening	Additional Information
Kevin Worthy Fate High School	9-12	Originally scheduled for 2027	Location: Fate; Mascot: Wolverines; Colors: Navy & Vegas
David & Shirley Magness Middle School	6-8	Originally scheduled for 2026	

=== Alternative Schools ===
- H.H. Browning Alternative Learning Center (Royse City)

== See also ==
- List of school districts in Texas
