= Royse City, Texas =

- City
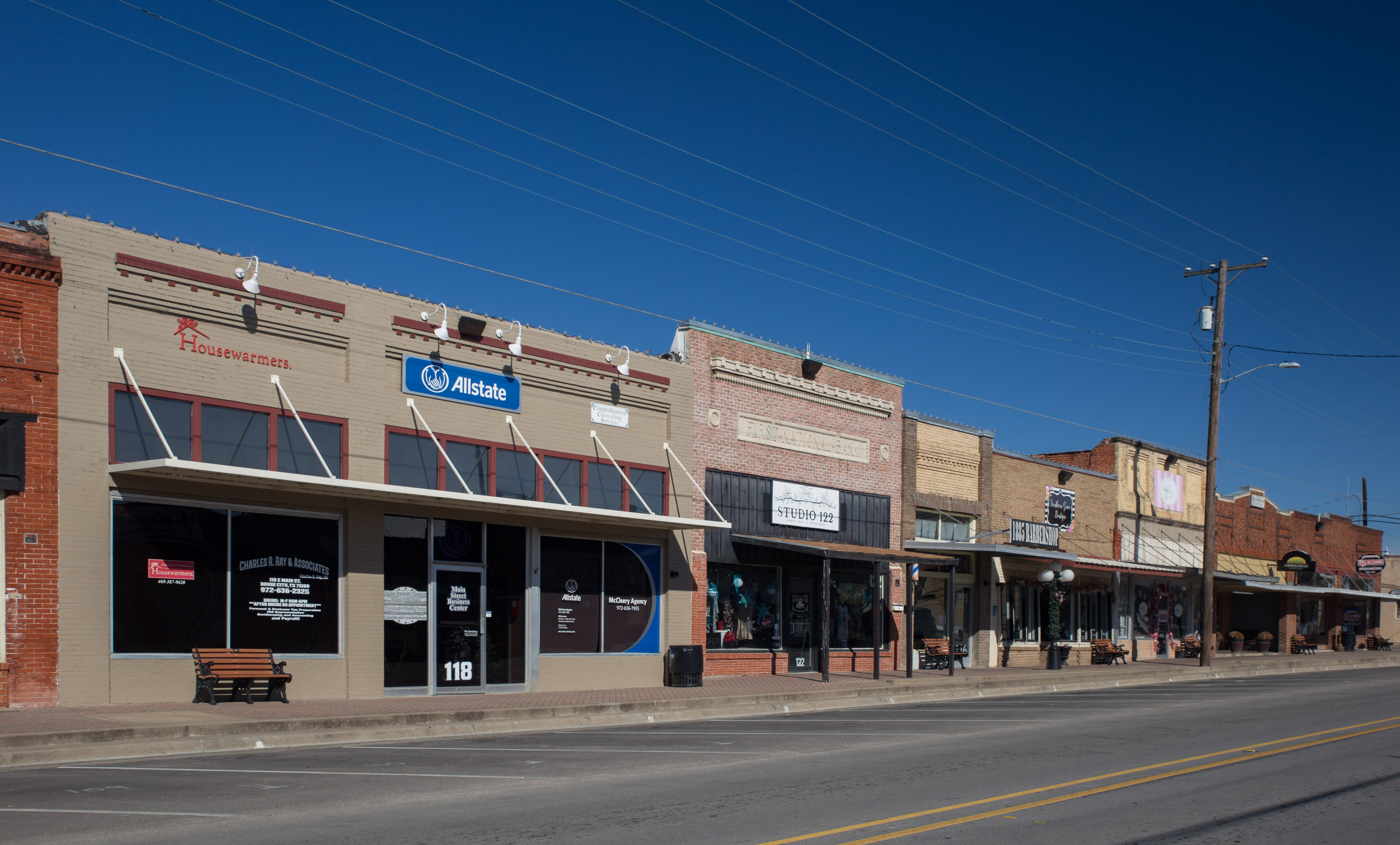
- Main Street in Royse City
- Motto: "A Friendly Touch of Texas"
- Location of Royse City in Rockwall County, Texas
- Coordinates: 32°59′31″N 96°17′50″W
- Country: United States
- State: Texas
- Counties: Rockwall, Collin, Hunt

Government
  - Type: Council-Manager
  - City Council: Mayor

Area
  - Total: 18.42 sq mi (47.71 km^{2})
  - Land: 18.29 sq mi (47.38 km^{2})
  - Water: 0.13 sq mi (0.33 km^{2})
- Elevation: 522 ft (159 m)

Population (2020)
  - Total: 13,508
  - Estimate (2025): 28,307
  - Density: 803.6/sq mi (310.27/km^{2})
- Time zone: UTC-6 (CST)
  - Summer (DST): UTC-5 (CDT)
- ZIP code: 75189
- Area codes: 214, 469, 903, 945, 972
- FIPS code: 48-63668
- GNIS feature ID: 2411012
- Website: www.roysecity.com

Royse City is a city in Rockwall County in the U.S. state of Texas. It also extends into Collin and Hunt counties. and is also part of the Dallas-Fort Worth Metroplex. The population was 2,957 at the 2000 census, rising to 9,349 in 2010. The estimated population in 2018 was 12,998. In 2020, its population grew to 13,508.

== History ==
Garrett Burgess Griffin Royse, better known as Byrd Royse, was born in Adair County, Kentucky, on January 31, 1838, to William and Mary Stone Royse. He was the seventh of 14 children. Circa 1850, Royse's future grandmother-in-law, Mrs. Nancy McCasland, and her sons bought several tracts of land that were later to become known as Royse City.

Royse was instrumental in getting the Missouri, Kansas and Texas Railway line brought from Greenville to Dallas through Rockwall County. Royse City was settled in 1885, when the railway came through the area. The town was named after G. B. Royse, who plotted the town and sold the first lots.

After its founding, Royse City preserved its stable, small, country-town status due to its proximity to Garland (21 miles away) and Dallas (33 miles).

Interstate 30 was constructed just south of the city in the mid-1960s. The city grew south to meet the interstate.

In 2000, Royse City had a population of 2,957. Still a small town, Royse City was feeling the impacts of the rapid growth of the Dallas-Fort Worth area, along with Rockwall County. The city's location along Interstate 30 between Rockwall and Greenville helped to fuel this growth.

Royse City has grown rapidly to the north and south as newer subdivisions have been built. By 2010, Royse City had a population of 9,349, according to the U.S. Census Bureau. This represents a growth rate of 216.2%.

== Geography ==
Royse City is located in the northeastern corner of Rockwall County, and extends north into Collin County and east into Hunt County. According to the United States Census Bureau, Royse City has a total area of 15.1 square miles (39.2 km^{2}), of which 15.0 square miles (38.9 km^{2}) are land and 0.1 square miles (0.3 km^{2}), or 0.75%, is covered by water.

== Demographics ==
Historical population
Census	Pop.	Note	%±
1890	299		—
1900	503		68.2%
1910	1,210		140.6%
1920	1,289		6.5%
1930	1,128		−12.5%
1940	1,190		5.5%
1950	1,266		6.4%
1960	1,274		0.6%
1970	1,535		20.5%
1980	1,566		2.0%
1990	2,206		40.9%
2000	2,957		34.0%
2010	9,349		216.2%
2020	13,508		44.5%
2025 (est.)	28,307		109.6%
U.S. Decennial Census

=== 2020 census ===
As of the 2020 census, Royse City had a population of 13,508, 4,335 households, and 3,711 families residing in the city. The median age was 32.8 years. 30.7% of residents were under the age of 18 and 8.7% of residents were 65 years of age or older. For every 100 females there were 94.8 males, and for every 100 females age 18 and over there were 90.8 males age 18 and over.

90.8% of residents lived in urban areas, while 9.2% lived in rural areas.

Of the 4,335 households in Royse City, 51.2% had children under the age of 18 living in them. Of all households, 62.4% were married-couple households, 11.8% were households with a male householder and no spouse or partner present, and 20.2% were households with a female householder and no spouse or partner present. About 13.5% of all households were made up of individuals and 4.9% had someone living alone who was 65 years of age or older.

There were 4,607 housing units, of which 5.9% were vacant. The homeowner vacancy rate was 2.3% and the rental vacancy rate was 11.3%.

Racial composition as of the 2020 census
Race	Number	Percent
White	9,205	68.1%
Black or African American	1,145	8.5%
American Indian and Alaska Native	153	1.1%
Asian	226	1.7%
Native Hawaiian and Other Pacific Islander	14	0.1%
Some other race	1,002	7.4%
Two or more races	1,763	13.1%
Hispanic or Latino (of any race)	3,122	23.1%

=== 2000 census ===
At the 2000 census, the racial makeup of the city was 79.44% White, 7.51% African American, 0.47% Native American, 0.54% Asian, 9.54% from other races, and 2.50% from two or more races. Hispanics or Latinos of any race were 20.97% of the population. At that time, there were 2,957 people, 1,027 households, and 781 families residing in the city.

In 2000, the median income for a household in the city was $42,266, and for a family was $48,804. Men had a median income of $30,966 versus $23,804 for women. The per capita income for the city was $17,153. About 8.4% of families and 10.4% of the population were below the poverty line, including 12.0% of those under age 18 and 10.2% of those age 65 or over.

== Economy ==
Royse City serves as a bedroom community for nearby Dallas and Greenville. Most of the development in the city is residential. The local economy consists of service businesses, restaurants, stores, schools, and medical offices. In June 2019, the popular travel center chain Buc-ee's added a store in Royse City.

In 2007, Royse City was designated as an official Texas Main Street City. The Royse City Main Street program was set up to promote the city's downtown area, where the goals are to foster a thriving business district, while preserving historic buildings. In 2015, construction was completed on an overpass at Interstate 30 and Erby Campbell Blvd.

== Education ==
The entirety of Royse City is served by the Royse City Independent School District. Royse City High School (RCHS) is only high school serving the entirety of Royse City. In the 2024 U.S. News & World Report high school rankings, RCHS ranked #569 in Texas and #183 in the Dallas Metro Area.

== Infrastructure ==
=== Roads ===
- I-30 is the primary route through Royse City.
- SH 66 (Texas State Highway 66).

== Notable people ==
- Mule Dowell, football player
- Taylor Hearn, baseball player
- Gus Ketchum, baseball player
- Olivia Mojica, semi-finalist from American Idol
- Glen Payne, southern gospel vocalist, formerly of the Cathedral Quartet
