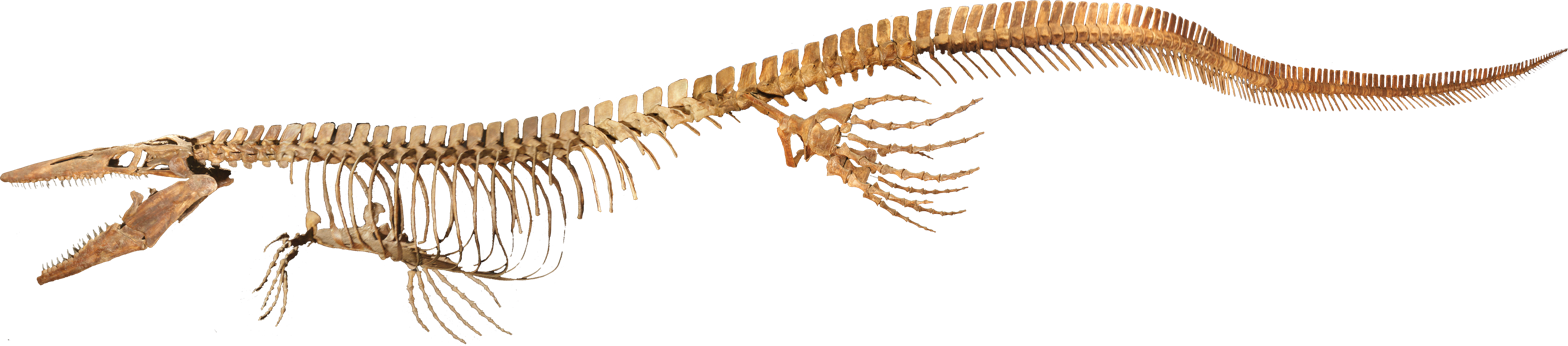
- Mounted cast of the T. rex "Bunker" specimen (KUVP 5033)

Scientific classification
- Kingdom: Animalia
- Phylum: Chordata
- Class: Reptilia
- Order: Squamata
- Clade: †Mosasauria
- Family: †Mosasauridae
- Clade: †Russellosaurina
- Subfamily: †Tylosaurinae
- Genus: †Tylosaurus; Marsh, 1872

Type species
- †Macrosaurus proriger Cope, 1869

Species
- †T. proriger Cope, 1869 (type); †T. nepaeolicus Cope, 1874; †T. ivoensis Persson, 1963; †T. iembeensis Antunes, 1964; †T. kansasensis Everhart, 2005; †T. rex Zietlow, Polcyn & Tykoski, 2026; Species pending reassessment: †T. bernardi Dollo, 1885; †T. gaudryi Thevenin, 1896; †T. pembinensis Nicholls, 1988; †T. saskatchewanensis Jiménez-Huidobro et al., 2018

Synonyms
- List of synonyms: Synonyms of genus; Rhamphosaurus Cope, 1872 (preoccupied); Rhinosaurus Marsh, 1872 (preoccupied); Hainosaurus? Dollo, 1885 Synonyms of T. proriger; Macrosaurus proriger Cope, 1869; Macrosaurus pririger Cope, 1869; Liodon proriger Cope, 1869; Rhinosaurus proriger Marsh, 1872; Rhinosaurus micromus Cope, 1872; Tylosaurus dyspelor Leidy, 1873; Tylosaurus micromus Merriam, 1894 Synonyms of T. nepaeolicus; Liodon nepaeolicus Cope, 1874; Tylosaurus kansasensis? Everhart, 2005 Synonyms of T. bernardi; Hainosaurus bernardi Dollo, 1885 Synonyms of T. gaudryi; Mosasaurus gaudryi Thevenin, 1896; Hainosaurus gaudryi Lingham-Soliar, 1992 Synonyms of T. ivoensis; Leiodon lundgreni Schröder, 1885; Mosasaurus hoffmanni ivoensis Persson, 1963; Mosasaurus ivoensis Russell, 1967; Hainosaurus ivoensis Lindgren, 1998 Synonyms of T. iembeensis; Mosasaurus iembeensis Antunes, 1964 Synonyms of T. pembinensis; Hainosaurus pembinensis Nicholls, 1988

= Tylosaurus =

Tylosaurus Temporal range: Turonian-Maastrichtian, ~92.1–66 Ma

Extinct genus of marine squamate reptiles

Tylosaurus (/ˌtaɪˈloʊˈsɔːrəs/; "knob lizard") is a genus of russellosaurine mosasaur (an extinct group of predatory marine lizards) that lived about 92 to 66 million years ago during the Turonian to Maastrichtian stages of the Late Cretaceous. The genus contains at least ten validly named species, the largest of which, T. rex, estimated to have reached over 13 meters (43 ft) long and weighed nearly 8.4 tonnes (19,000 lb). Its fossils have been found primarily around North Atlantic Ocean including in North America, Europe, and Africa.

The first named species, T. proriger, was originally described in 1869 by Edward Drinker Cope as a member of a separate mosasaur genus, Macrosaurus which is now synonymous with Halisaurus, and subsequently redescribed as the type species of the genus Tylosaurus named in 1872 by Othniel Charles Marsh. Fossil evidence shows that Tylosaurus regularly engaged in intraspecific combat and consumed various prey as an apex predator of their ecosystem, including predatory fish, ornithuran birds, sea turtles, plesiosaurs and other mosasaurs. It had an endothermic metabolism, which is unlike nearly all modern squamates.

== Research history ==
=== Possible first finds ===
The earliest Tylosaurus fossils were likely discovered by various Native American peoples and may have been the source of much of their folklore, with the earliest known ones dating back to well before the arrival of European settlers, around the 1500s. More recent accounts from peoples living in the Great Plains even speak of an ancient era ruled by massive aquatic creatures that were in constant combat with thunderbirds and were petrified by them. The considerable presence of fossils of large mosasaurs such as Tylosaurus and pterosaurs such as Pteranodon in this region may have been the origins of these myths.

In 1804, the Lewis and Clark Expedition discovered a now-lost fossil skeleton alongside the Missouri River, which was identified as a 45-foot (14 m) long fish. In 2003, Richard Ellis speculated that the remains may have belonged to Mosasaurus missouriensis. Alternatively, a 2007 study led by Robert W. Meredith and colleagues suggested that the fossils would possibly come from a tylosaurine mosasaur based on the measurements cited by Clark and Gass and the evidence of Tylosaurus fossils that have been found in the Missouri River. However, the authors also mentioned the possibility that the remains would also come from an elasmosaurid plesiosaur, which are also known from the river, although being rarer.

=== First formal discoveries ===
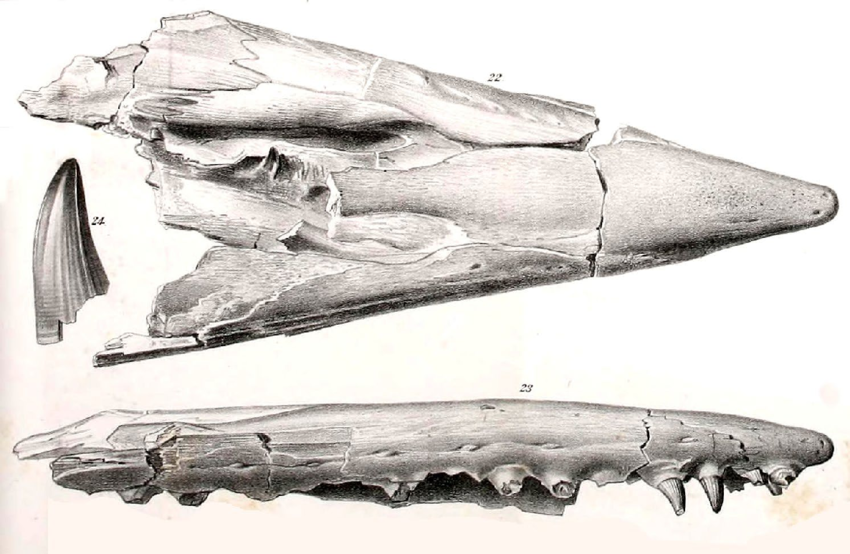
The skull of MCZ 4374, the holotype specimen of T. proriger, in Cope (1870)

Tylosaurus was the third new genus of mosasaur to be described from North America behind Clidastes and Platecarpus and the first in Kansas. The early history of the genus as a taxon was subject to complications spurred by the infamous rivalry between Edward Drinker Cope and Othniel Charles Marsh during the Bone Wars. The type specimen was discovered in the late 1860s by U.S. Army colonel John Butler Conyngham and a certain Mr. Minor in a deposit of the Niobrara Formation located near Monument Rocks, close to the Union Pacific Railroad line at Fort Hays, Kansas. The discovery consisted of a partial skull measuring nearly 5 feet (1.5 m) in length associated with thirteen vertebrae. Acquired by Louis Agassiz during his visit to the Great Plains in August 1868, the specimen has since been catalogued as MCZ 4374. After noticing photographs of it at a meeting of the Academy of Natural Sciences of Philadelphia, Cope borrowed the specimen from Agassiz and presented a preliminary description of it in 1869. His first publication of the fossil was very brief and was named Macrosaurus proriger, the genus being a preexisting European mosasaur taxon. The specific epithet proriger means "prow-bearing", which is in reference to the specimen's unique prow-like elongated rostrum and is derived from the Latin word prōra (prow) and suffix -gero (I bear). In 1870, Cope published a more thorough description of the type specimen. Without explanation, he moved the species into another European genus Liodon and declared his original M. proriger a synonym.

In 1872, Marsh argued that L. proriger is taxonomically distinct from the European genus and must be assigned a new one. For this, he erected the genus Rhinosaurus, which means "nose lizard" and is a portmanteau derived from the Ancient Greek words ῥίς (rhī́s, meaning "nose") and σαῦρος (saûros, meaning "lizard"). Cope responded by arguing that Rhinosaurus was already a preoccupied synonym of Liodon. He disagreed with Marsh's arguments but proposed that in case Marsh was indeed correct, the genus name Rhamphosaurus should be used. Marsh later discovered that the taxon Rhamphosaurus was preoccupied as a genus of lizard named in 1843. As a result, he suggested a move to a newly erected genus named Tylosaurus. This name means "knob lizard" in another reference to the elongated rostrum characteristic of the genus. It is derived from the Latin tylos (knob) and Ancient Greek σαῦρος. Despite coining the new genus, Marsh never formally transferred this Rhinosaurus species to Tylosaurus; this was first done in 1873 by Joseph Leidy. Tylosaurus subsequently became the almost universally accepted genus to include this species, the exception to this adoption being Cope, who refused to accept Marsh's new genus and continued to refer the species as Liodon. Cope's persistence can be seen in his 1874 description of another species which he named L. nepaeolicus. The type specimen of this species was discovered by Benjamin Franklin Mudge near the Solomon River, and consists of several cranial fragments and a dorsal vertebra now catalogued as AMNH 1565. This species, whose specific epithet refers to Nepaholla, the Native American name for the Salomon River is formally transferred to the genus Tylosaurus in 1894 by John Campbell Merriam. In 2026, Amelia R. Zietlow, Michael J. Everhart, and Michael J. Polcyn redescribed the holotype specimens of T. proriger and T. nepaeolicus, 150 years after their original descriptions by Cope, revising the diagnoses of both species.

=== Later discoveries and other species ===
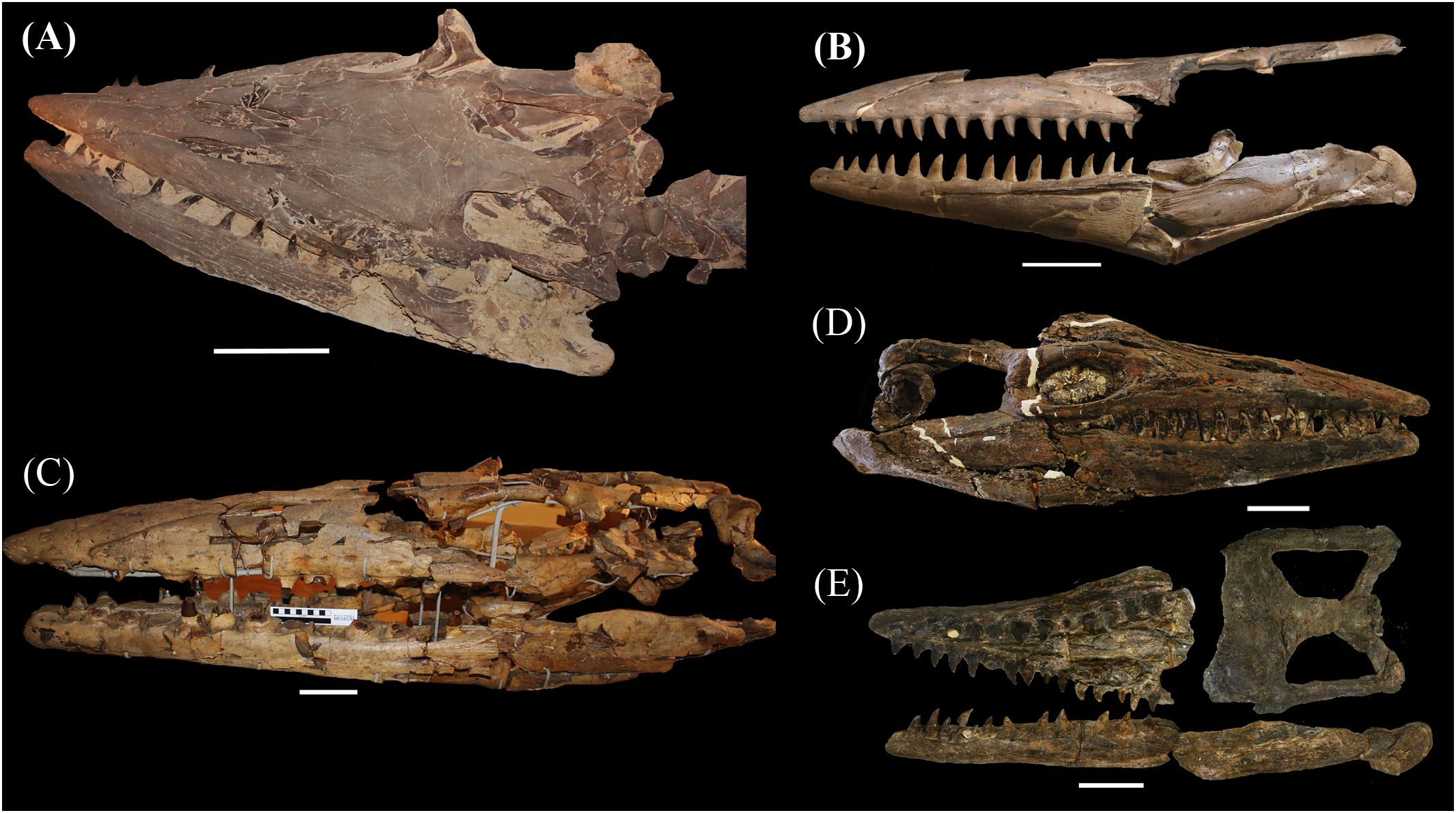
Fossil skulls of Tylosaurus species (A) T. proriger, (B) T. nepaeolicus, (C) T. bernardi, (D) T. saskatchewanensis, and (E) T. pembinensis

In his major work published in 1967, Dale A. Russell recognized only two valid species in Tylosaurus, namely T. proriger and T. nepaeolicus. However, throughout the 19th and 20th centuries, many species of mosasaurs coming from around the world, originally described as being from separate genera, were now recognized as belonging to Tylosaurus.

In 1885, Louis Dollo described the genus and species Hainosaurus bernardi from an almost complete but poorly preserved skeleton discovered in a phosphate quarry in the Ciply Basin of Mesvin, Belgium, since numbered as IRSNB R23. The genus name Hainosaurus means "lizard from the Haine", in reference to the eponymous river located nearby the Ciply Basin. The specific epithet bernardi is named in honor of Leopold Bernard, who made the excavation and exhumation of the specimen possible. In 1988, a second species historically pertained to Hainosaurus was described by Elizabeth Nicholls based on a partial skeleton catalogued as MT 2 and having been discovered in Manitoba, Canada. The specific epithet refers to the type locality of the taxon, namely the Pembina Member of the Pierre Shale. The attribution of H. pembinensis to Hainosaurus is first discussed by Johan Lindgren in 2005, but it was in a revision published in 2010 that the species was moved to Tylosaurus by Timon Bullard and Michael Caldwell, being then renamed as T. pembinensis. In this same revision, the authors suggested that a redescription of the type species H. bernardi would be necessary in order to know if Hainosaurus should be maintained as a distinct genus. This redescription was finally carried out by Paulina Jimenez-Huidobro and Caldwell in 2016, in which they transferred the species to Tylosaurus, being then renamed as T. bernardi. Although this new combination has been widely recognized since, some authors nevertheless suggest continuing to maintain the genus Hainosaurus as distinct, justified in particular on the basis of dental traits not detailed in the 2016 revision.

Fragmentary holotype skull of T. gaudryi (MNHN 1896–15)

In 1896, Armand Thevenin described a new mosasaurid on the basis of a partial skull discovered at Éclusier-Vaux, in Somme, France. In his description, Thevenin thinks that this specimen, since catalogued as MNHN 1896–15, would represent a new species of Mosasaurus, naming it Mosasaurus gaudryi. The specific epithet is named in honor of his mentor Jean Albert Gaudry, the latter having previously studied the skull and thinking that it would come from a species of Liodon. In 1992, Theagarten Lingham-Soliar reassigned the species to Hainosaurus, having previously interpreted the holotype as an additional specimen of H. bernardi. In 2005, Lindgren moved this species to Tylosaurus, notably due to its dental characteristics being closer to other members of the genus.

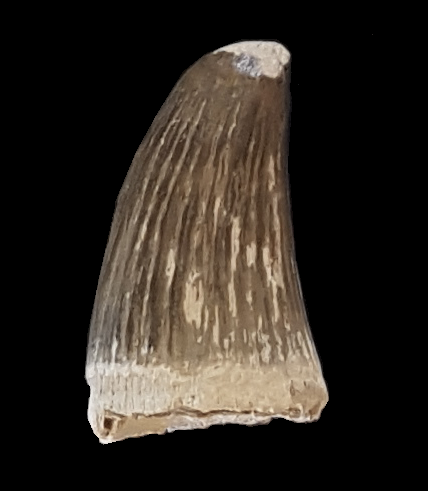
Isolated tooth of T. ivoensis

In 1963, Per Ove Persson identified a new mosasaurid on the basis of isolated teeth discovered in a deposit located in Ivö Klack, near Ivö Lake in the Kristianstad Basin in Scania, Sweden. Fossils from this same taxon have been documented in this area since 1836, but it is from that year onwards that they are described as coming from a subspecies of Mosasaurus hoffmannii, named M. hoffmannii ivoensis in reference to Ivö Klack. In 1967, Russell elevated the taxon to a separate species within the genus, and assigned to it fossils from the Niobrara Formation of Kansas, including a partial skull. When the taxon was significantly revised in a in 2002 study, being reassigned to Tylosaurus, Lindgren and Mikael Siverson referred additional fossils to this latter that had been discovered at Ivö Klack, including cranial and vertebral remains. In their study, the authors also found that Russell's attributions of the Kansas fossils to this species were erroneous, the remains coming from a distinct taxon. The study furthermore noted similarities between these teeth and those of Taniwhasaurus, but considered such an attribution unlikely because of the limited material known for this related genus and its geographic distance (Taniwhasaurus then being known exclusively from New Zealand). However, in 2008, Caldwell and colleagues reported the presence of Taniwhasaurus in northern Japan and reaffirmed the dental similarities with T. ivoensis. This discovery revived the hypothesis of a possible reassignment of the species to Taniwhasaurus, but the authors see this as a subject for another study.

In 1964, Miguel Telles Antunes described the species Mosasaurus iembeensis from a partial skull excavated from the Itombe Formation near the town of Iembe (hence the name), Angola. In 1992, Lingham-Soliar argued that the cranial features were not consistent with those of Mosasaurus and were more characteristic of Tylosaurus, the species being renamed as T. iembeensis. However, the author did not identify the holotype skull, which he considered to reside in the collections of the NOVA University Lisbon without a catalogue number, and it is since 2006 reported as being destroyed in a fire. In 2012, Octávio Mateus and colleagues reported that an additional specimen of T. iembeensis consisting of fragmentary cranial elements was recovered during an expedition to the locality of the since-destroyed holotype, although it was not figured or formally described.

Holotype skull of the disputed species T. kansasensis (FHSM VP-2295)

In 2005, Michael J. Everhart described the species T. kansasensis based on thirteen specimens recovered from the Niobrara Formation of Kansas. The holotype specimen, catalogued as FHSM VP-2295, consists of a well-preserved complete skull associated with six cervical vertebrae that was discovered in 1968 in Ellis County. Prior to its formal description, several authors had already suggested during the 1990s that this specimen might represent a new species of Tylosaurus. This interpretation was nevertheless challenged by Caldwell as early as 2007. At the 2013 annual meeting of the Society of Vertebrate Paleontology, Caldwell and Jiménez-Huidobro presented an abstract questioning the distinction between T. kansasensis and T. nepaeolicus. This hypothesis was further developed in a 2016 study led by Caldwell, which interpreted T. kansasensis as a juvenile form of T. nepaeolicus, thereby treating the former as a junior synonym of the latter. This conclusion was subsequently rejected by Everhart himself in his 2017 book, in which he described the study as "poorly researched and written" without further elaborating on the criticism. In 2018, Robert F. Stewart and Jordan Mallon also rejected this synonymy, arguing that the differences observed between T. kansasensis and T. nepaeolicus do not match the ontogenetic variation documented in T. proriger. In 2020, Amelia R. Zietlow renewed support for Caldwell's hypothesis on the basis of a cladistic analysis incorporating ontograms.

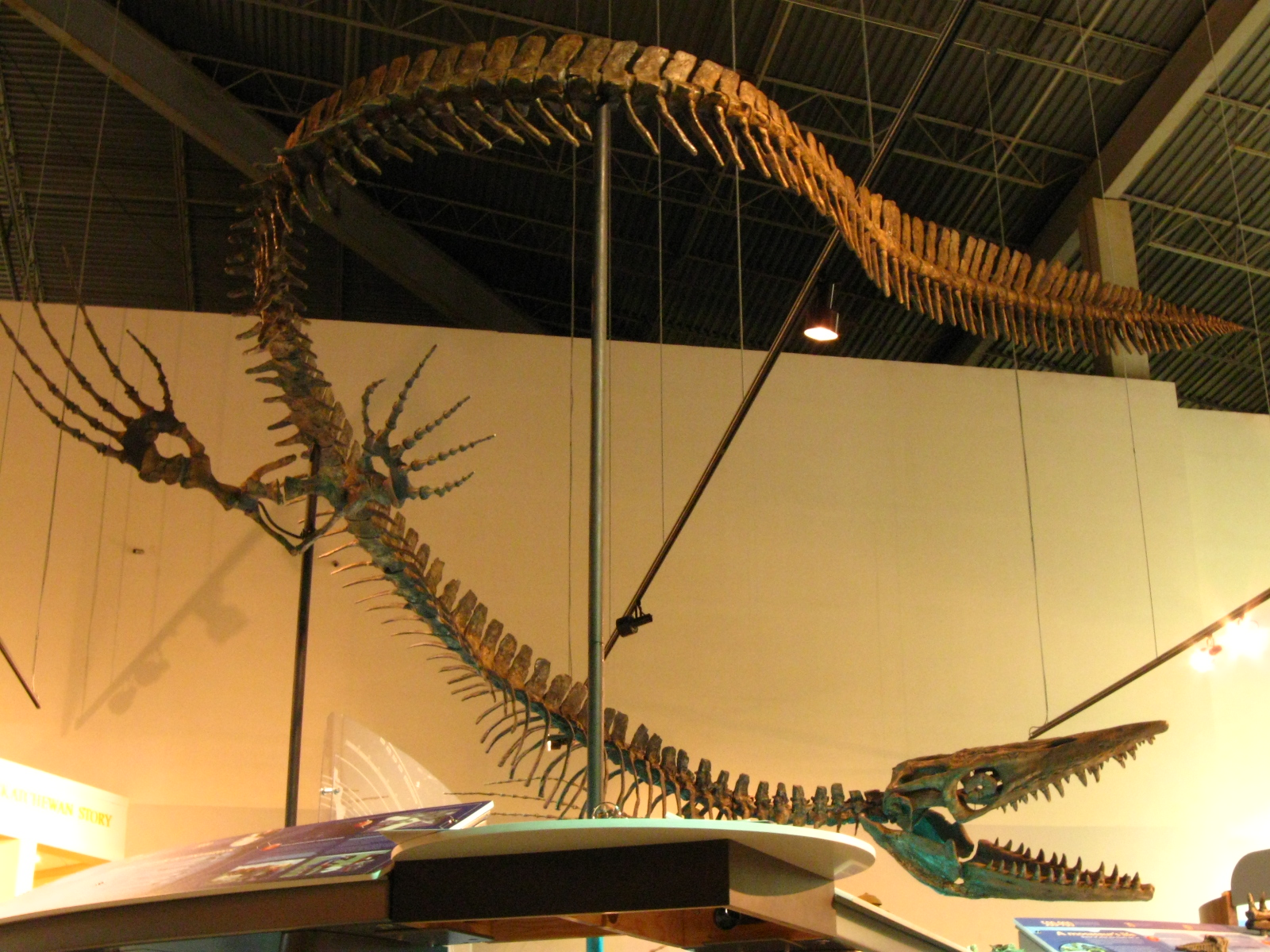
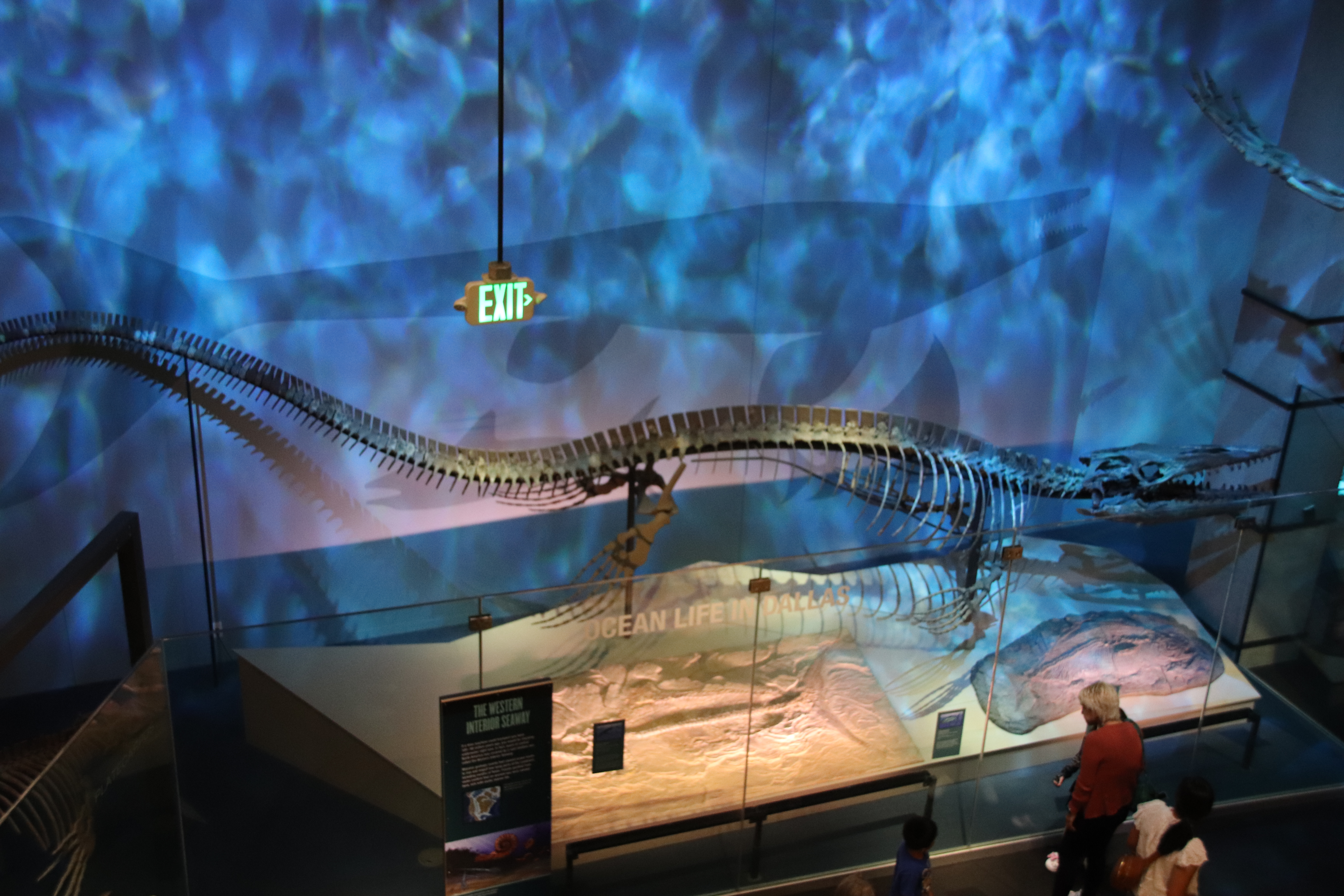
Skeletal reconstruction of T. saskatchewanensis (left) and the holotype specimen of T. rex (PMNS 8029; right)

In his 2006 Master of Science thesis, Bullard described the species T. saskatchewanensis from a partial skeleton catalogued as RSM P2588.1, known from the Bearpaw Formation. This specimen, nicknamed "Omācīw" (meaning "hunter" in Cree), was discovered in 1994 near Herbert Ferry, at the Lake Diefenbaker, Saskatchewan. Although originally described informally and via incompletely prepared fossils, the proposed taxon was nevertheless recognized as valid in some subsequent studies. In 2018, Bullard co-authored a multi-author study led by Jiménez-Huidobro which formally described Omācīw, which by then was more fully prepared, and confirmed its identity as belonging to a distinct species. The following year, Jiménez-Huidobro and Caldwell noted the strong anatomical similarities between the dubious species T. neumilleri, T. saskatchewanensis, and T. pembinensis, later leading Zietlow, Polcyn, and Ronald S. Tykoski to suggest in 2026 that the first two could represent junior synonyms of the latter.

In his 2020 MS thesis, Samuel Garvey described a specimen of Tylosaurus catalogued as TMP 2014.011.0001, discovered in the Puskwaskau Formation in Alberta. Recovered approximately 55 kilometers (34 mi) northeast of Grande Prairie, this fossil, consisting of a partial snout and a fragmentary mandible, represents the northernmost known occurrence of the genus. Its morphology was recognized as very distinct from the other recognized species, featuring notably slender paedomorphic teeth. Garvey therefore considered that it could represent a new species, which he named T. "borealis" in reference to its northern distribution.

In 2026, Zietlow, Polcyn, and Tykoski described the species T. rex based on numerous more or less complete fossil specimens discovered in the fossil record of Texas and Kansas, which had previously been assigned to T. proriger. The holotype consists of a partial skeleton preserving, among other remains, a complete skull catalogued as PMNS 8029, discovered in 1979 in Lake Ray Hubbard, a reservoir located east of Dallas. The specimen was long informally nicknamed as the "Heath mosasaur", after the eponymous city within whose boundaries it was discovered. Its exact stratigraphic position is uncertain, but its locality indicates that it originated from the Wolfe City Formation. The specific name rex, meaning "king" in Latin, is an homage to a passage from a 1967 letter written by John T. Thurmond to Barnum Brown, in which he suggested that some Texan specimens of Tylosaurus might represent a distinct species because of their gigantic size. The authors also considered this name appropriate due to the animal's massive skull, large serrated teeth, and powerful musculature, all of which reflect its role as an apex predator.

=== Depiction history ===
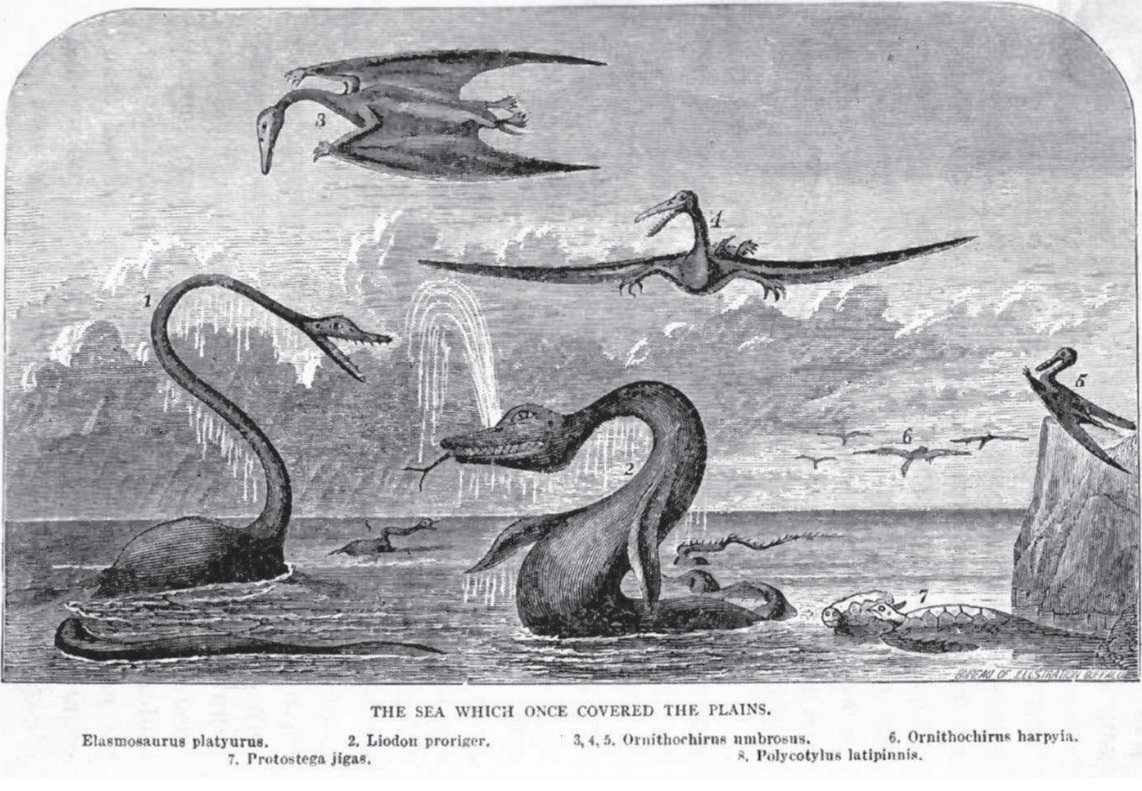
Early restoration of Tylosaurus (center) with an unrealistically elongated neck and tail by Henry Worrall, 1872

When Cope described the holotype specimen of T. proriger in 1870, he visualized it as an "excessively elongated reptile", due the morphological arrangement of its caudal vertebrae. Based on his descriptions, it would have corresponded to a sea-serpent-like marine reptile, with the largest individuals reaching sizes comparable to those of the largest cetaceans. The following year, Cope added more details to his visualization of the animal. For him, the head of Tylosaurus would be conical in shape, with eyes on top, and having a jaw connected to a throat similar to that of a pelican, thus facilitating the entry of its prey. Still according to Cope, the animal would have had only the flippers located at the front of the body, those at the back being absent. The tail is seen as long and flat, used in eel-like locomotion. This reconstruction was subsequently adopted in various works published during the late 19th century, although some authors also portrayed the animal with a long neck.

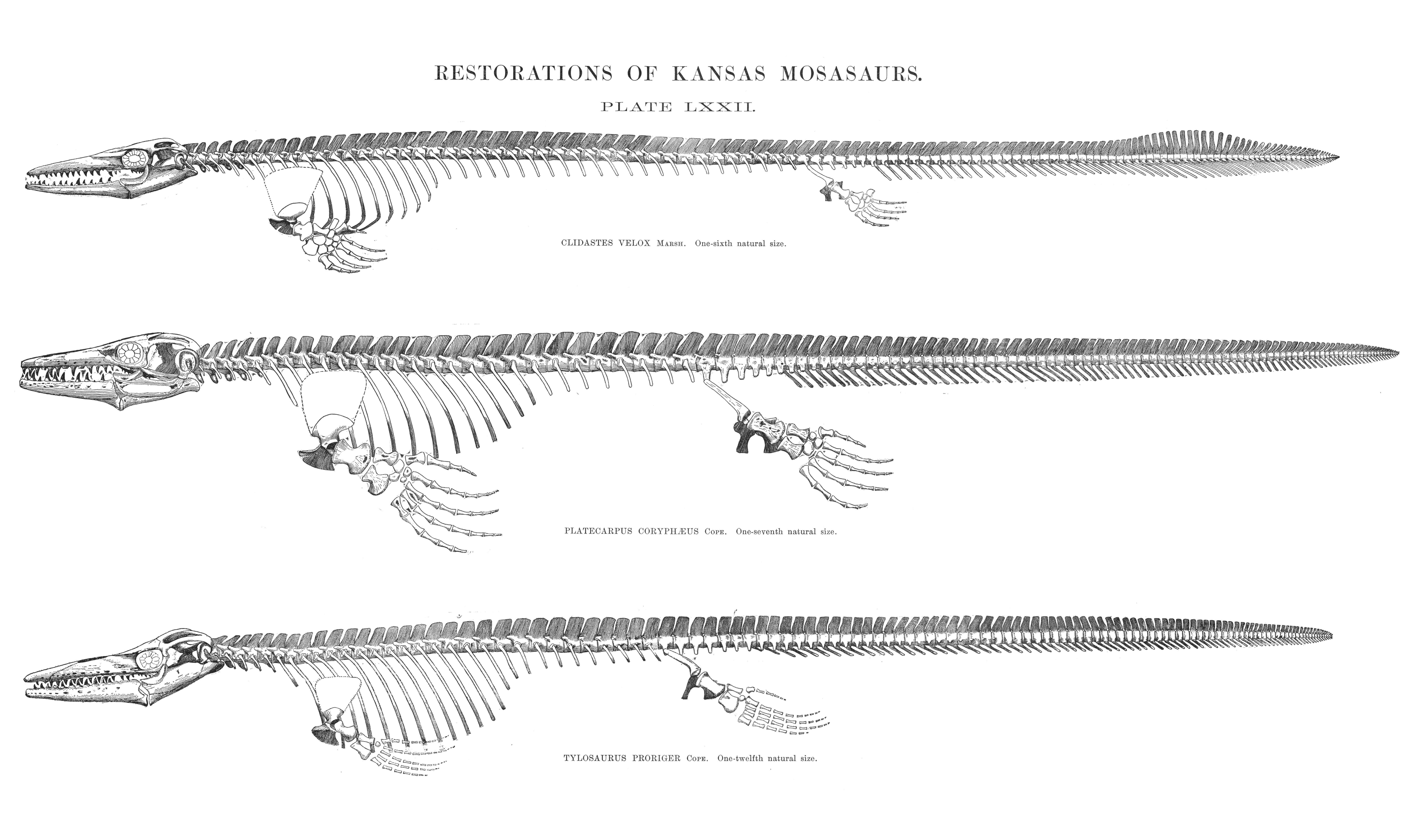
Figure from Williston's 1898 paper showing the first correct skeletal reconstruction of Tylosaurus (bottom)

Modern understanding of the anatomy of Tylosaurus started as early as 1898 with the publication of a major revision of the Kansas mosasaurs by Samuel Wendell Williston. In this work, he provided a new anatomical description of the genus, correcting numerous erroneous interpretations that had been proposed previously. Specifically, his paper included a rigorous skeletal reconstruction of T. proriger based on three partial specimens from the collections of the University of Kansas Natural History Museum. This reconstruction depicted the animal as a highly mobile marine reptile with four flippers, as well as a neck and tail that were considerably shorter than in earlier representations. Williston also estimated the maximum length of the animal at approximately 11 m (36 ft), a value close to those still proposed today. Although the vertebral column was reconstructed as straight rather than curved, (Note: Commenting on this problem, Everhart noted that Williston was already aware of the curvature of the mosasaur's spinal column and suggested that he would have insisted to draw it as straight in order to save space on the plate in which the reconstruction was published on.) this skeletal depiction is considered broadly accurate by modern standards. The discovery of the first known substantially complete skeleton of Tylosaurus was revealed as early as 1899 by Henry Fairfield Osborn, followed by other more or less similar finds which were made from the beginning of the 1900s.

== Description ==
Tylosaurus was a type of derived mosasaur, or a latecoming member with advanced evolutionary traits such as a fully aquatic lifestyle. As such, it had a streamlined body, an elongated tail ending with a downturn supporting a two-lobed fin, and two pairs of flippers. While in the past derived mosasaurs were depicted as akin to giant flippered sea snakes, it is now understood that they were more similar in build to other large marine vertebrates such as ichthyosaurs, marine crocodylomorphs, and archaeocete whales through convergent evolution.

=== Size ===
Estimated size range of Tylosaurus compared with a human.

Some species of Tylosaurus are among the largest known mosasaurs. The largest well-known specimen is a skeleton of T. rex from the University of Kansas Natural History Museum nicknamed "Bunker" (KUVP 5033). In 2026, Zietlow and colleagues estimated its size around 13.2 meters (43 ft), with the species as a whole ranging between 7.7–13.2 meters (25–43 ft). In the same year, Formoso and colleagues estimated that "Bunker" was nearly 13.5 meters (44 ft) long and weighed approximately 8,367 kilograms (18,446 lb).^{Extended Data 1} Large Tylosaurus specimens including KUVP 5033 were initially classified as giant specimens of the species T. proriger. With the recognition of T. rex, the size estimates of T. proriger have since been revised to lower ranges of between 3.9–9.5 meters (13–31 ft). The genus exhibits Cope's rule, in which its body size has been observed to generally increase over geologic time. In North America, the earliest representatives of Tylosaurus during the Turonian and Coniacian (90-86 mya), which included early T. nepaeolicus and its precursors, typically measured 5–7 meters (16–23 ft) long and weighed between 200–500 kilograms (440–1,100 lb). During the Santonian (86-83 mya), T. nepaeolicus and newly-appearing T. proriger were around 8–9 meters (26–30 ft) long, and estimated to have weighed around 1,100 kilograms (2,400 lb) by Everhart (2004), and 2,592 kilograms (5,714 lb) by Formoso et al. (2026).^{Extended Data 1} By the Early Campanian, the newly emerged T. rex attained lengths of 13–14 meters (43–46 ft). (Note: Because both species' representative specimens are mostly from a single formation or region respectively, it is possible that the apparent shorter maximum length of T. proriger compared to T. rex is an artifact of sampling bias.) Everhart speculated that because mosasaurs continuously grew throughout their lifetime, it would have been possible for some extremely old Tylosaurus individuals to reach 20 meters (66 ft) in absolute maximum length. However, he stressed the lack of fossil evidence suggesting such sizes and the odds against any being preserved.

Other Campanian-Maastrichtian species were similarly large. The most recent maximum size estimates for the holotype of T. bernardi are 12.2 meters (40 ft) by Lindgren (2005) and 11.6 meters (38 ft) by Zietlow et al. (2026); historically the species was erroneously estimated at even larger sizes of 15–17 meters (49–56 ft).^{Table S1} T. gaudryi, T. kansasensis and T. iembeensis have been estimated around 7.1 meters (23 ft), 2.9–7 meters (9.5–23.0 ft) and 5.5 meters (18 ft) respectively by Zietlow et al. (2026).^{Table S1} A reconstruction of T. saskatchewanensis by the Royal Saskatchewan Museum estimated a total length of over 9.75 meters (32.0 ft). A mounted skeleton of T. pembinensis, nicknamed "Bruce," at the Canadian Fossil Discovery Centre measures at 13.05 meters (42.8 ft) long and was awarded a Guinness World Records for "Largest mosasaur on display" in 2014. However, the skeleton was assembled for display prior to Bullard and Caldwell (2010)'s reassessment that found the species' number of vertebrae to be exaggerated. T. "borealis" is estimated at 6.5–8 meters (21–26 ft) in total length.

=== Skull ===
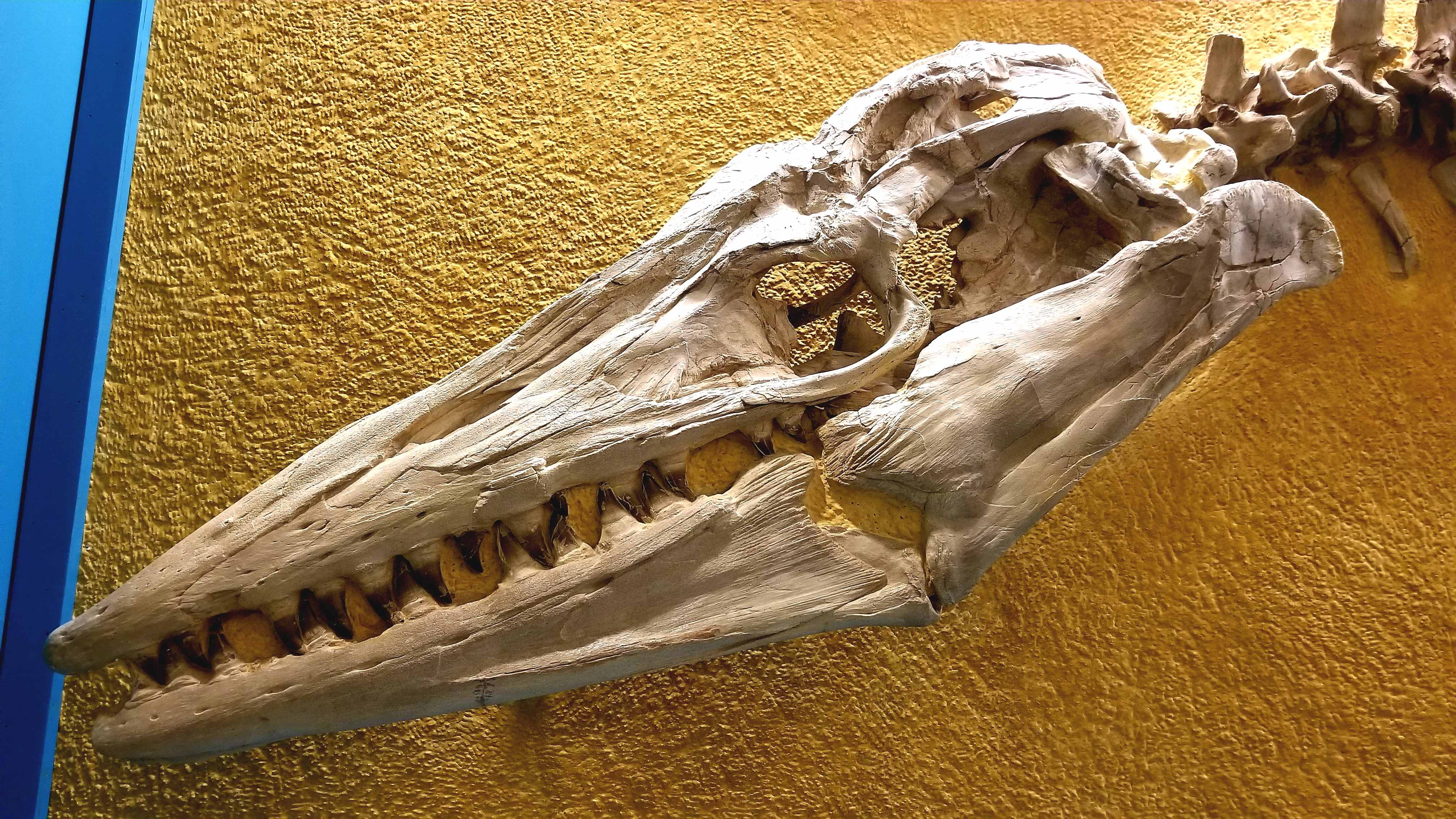
Profile view of a T. proriger skull (FHSM VP-3)

The largest known skull of Tylosaurus is T. rex KUVP 5033 (the "Bunker" specimen), estimated up to 1.63 meters (5.3 ft) long.^{Table S1} Depending on age and individual variation, Tylosaurus skulls were between 13 and 14% of the total skeleton length. The head was strongly conical and the snout proportionally longer than most mosasaurs, with the exception of Ectenosaurus.

==== Cranium ====
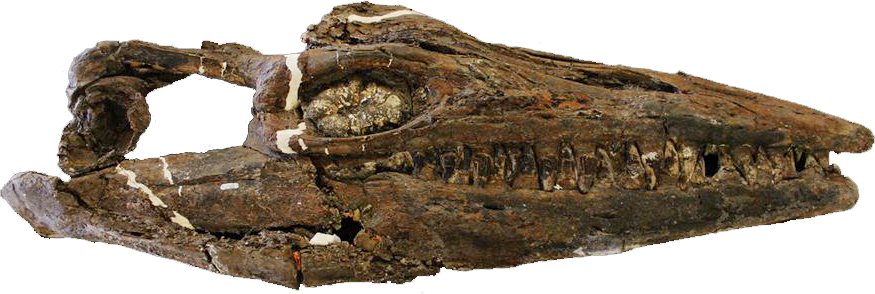
T. saskatchewanensis holotype skull showing the elongated rostrum

The most recognizable characteristic of Tylosaurus is the elongated edentulous rostrum that protrudes from its snout, for which the genus is named. This is formed by the elongation of the front end of the premaxilla and dentary. The rostrum was small and acutely angled at birth, but rapidly developed into a blunt, elongated "knob." The snout is heavily built, supported by a broad and robust internarial bar (comprising the posterodorsal process of the premaxilla, nasals, and anterior process of the frontal). The snout holds the terminal branches for the trigeminal nerves through randomly scattered foramina on the rostrum and along the ventral margin of the maxilla, above the gum line.

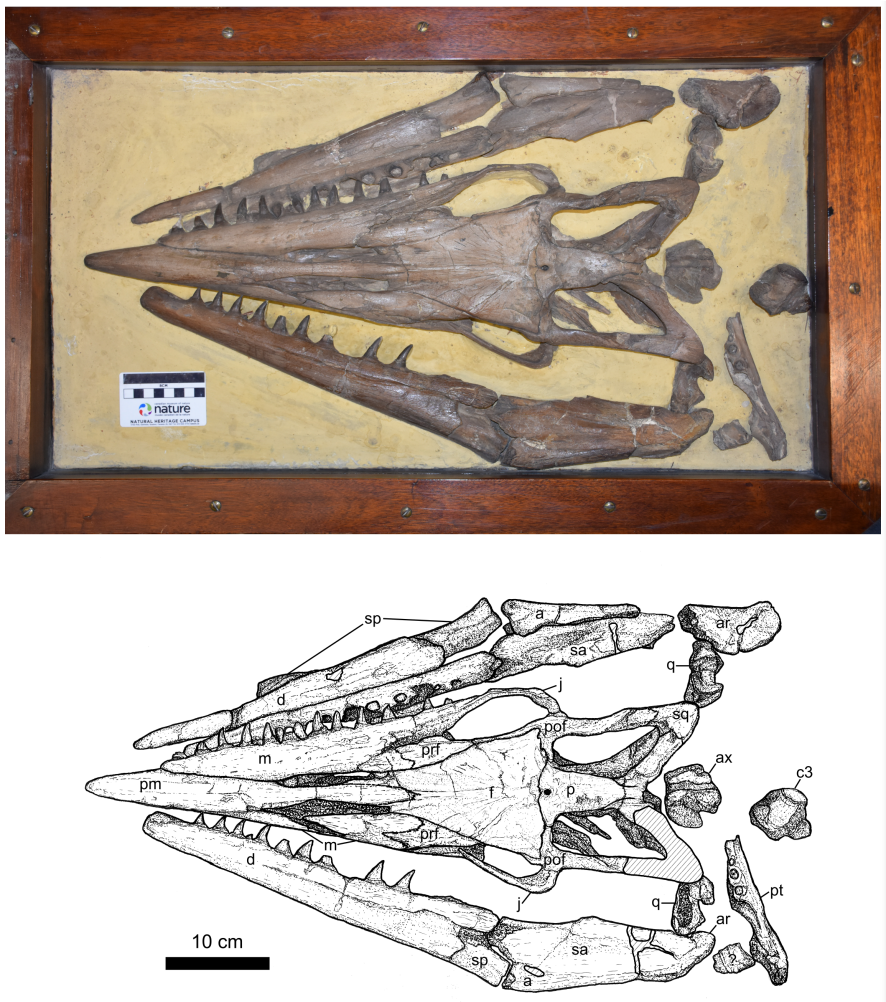
T. proriger skull (left) in dorsal view with mandibles; (right) in ventral view of cranium. Individual bones are labeled in the descriptions.

The premaxilla, maxilla, and frontal bones border the external nares, or body nostril openings; unlike other mosasaurs, the prefrontal bones are excluded from the border of the nares by a long posterodorsal process of the maxilla. The nares open above the fourth maxillary tooth anteriorly in T. proriger and T. pembinensis, (Note: Behind the fifth tooth in the holotype.) between the third and fourth tooth in T. nepaeolicus, and posterior to the fourth tooth in T. bernardi. Nare length relative to skull length varied between species: it is proportionally short in T. proriger (20-27% skull length), T. bernardi (24% skull length), and T. gaudryi (25-27% skull length), and long in T. pembinensis (28-31% skull length). The nasal bones were either free-floating or lightly articulated to the internarial bar, did not contact the frontal, and were not fused to each other as they are in extant varanid lizards. The nasals' loose association with the rest of the skull in Tylosaurus and other mosasaurs may be why the bones are frequently lost and therefore exceedingly rare; Tylosaurus is one of the only mosasaurs in which the nasal bones are clearly documented; the other is the holotype of Plotosaurus, although one of the bones is missing.

The external nares lead to the choanae (internal nares) in the palate, which provide passage from the nostrils to the throat. In Tylosaurus, they are shaped like a compressed teardrop and bordered by the vomers, palatines, and the maxilla. Anterior to the choanae, each vomer borders the fenestra for the Jacobson's organ, which is involved in the tongue-based sense of smell. It begins opposite of the fourth maxillary tooth in Tylosaurus, and also ends immediately past the fifth maxillary tooth in T. bernardi. The exit point for the veins leading to sinuses inside the palatine occur right in front of the Jacobson's organ between the vomers and maxilla. This differs from living varanids, where the exit occurs behind the organ.

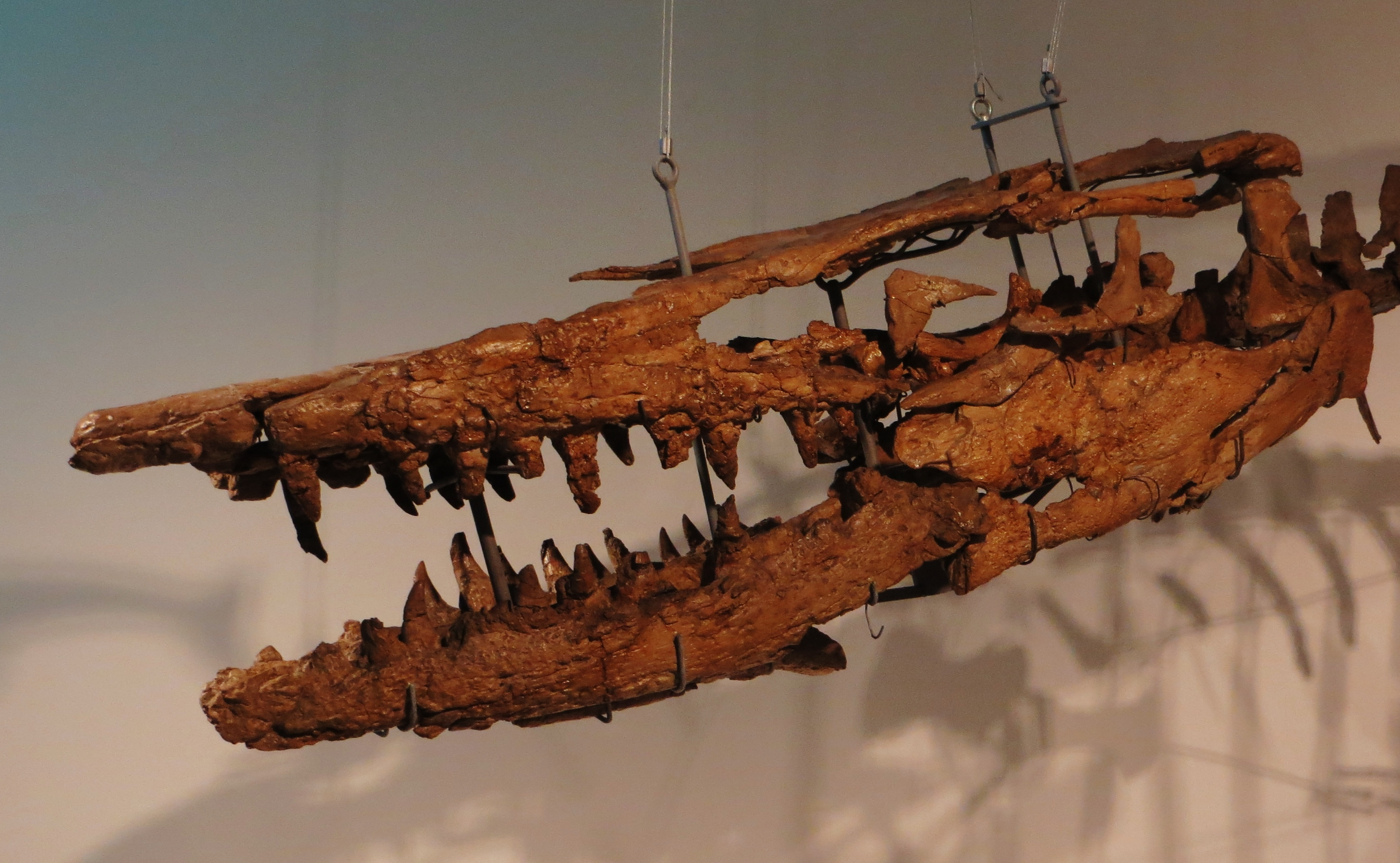
T. bernardi holotype skull with its jugal bone

The frontal bone in Tylosaurus usually, but not always, possesses a low midline crest. It is most prominent in T. proriger, and is moderately developed in T. saskatchewanensis and T. bernardi, extending onto the premaxilla in the latter. The frontal crest is present but poorly developed in most T. nepaeolicus skulls, and occasionally lost in some mature individuals. The frontal overlaps the prefrontals and postorbitofrontals above the orbits (eye sockets), and the parietal posteriorly. The position of the pineal eye on the parietal is variable, either appearing close to the frontoparietal suture or contacting it. The orbits are bordered by the prefrontal, lacrimal, postorbitofrontal, and jugal bones. A diagnostic feature of Tylosaurus is that the prefrontals and postorbitofrontals overlap above the orbits, preventing contribution of the frontal. The jugal forms the bottom of the orbit; in Tylosaurus, it is L-shaped and has a distinctive serif-like extension at the lower back corner of the junction between the horizontal and vertical rami (arms) called the posteroventral process. (Note: In one juvenile T. proriger specimen, it appears at the bottom of the vertical ramus instead.) The vertical ramus is overlapped by the postorbitofrontal in most species, and the horizontal ramus overlaps the maxilla. In T. bernardi, the vertical ramus is not overlapped but joins with the postorbitofrontal by a suture, and is much thicker than the horizontal ramus.

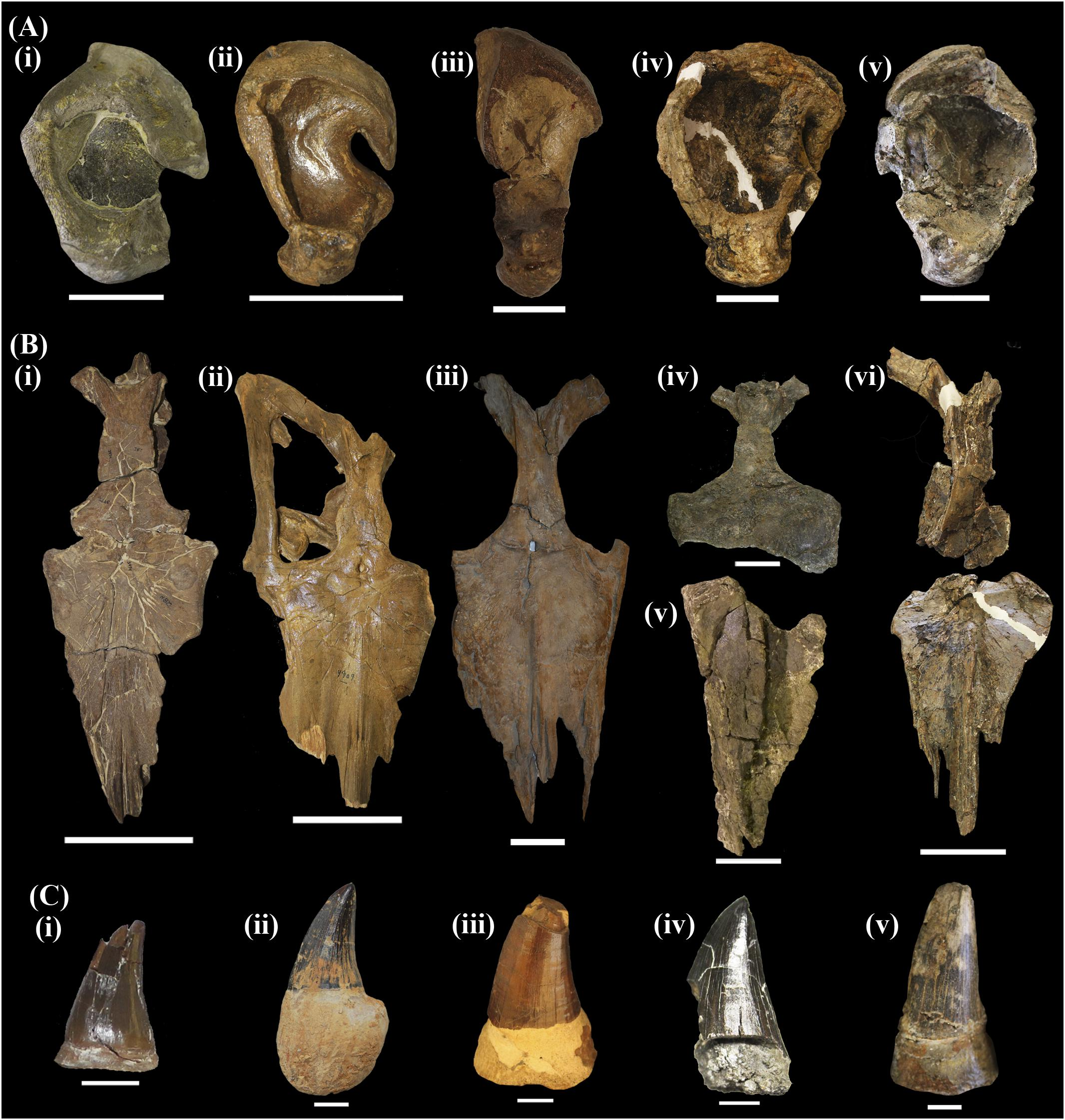
(A) quadrates, (B) skull roofs, and (C) teeth of (i) T. nepaeolicus, (ii) T. proriger, (iii) T. bernardi, (iv) T. pembinensis, and (v) T. saskatchewanensis

The quadrate bones (homologous to the incus in mammals) are located at the back of the skull, articulating the lower jaw to the cranium and holding the eardrums. The complex anatomy of the bone renders it extremely diagnostic, even to the species level. In lateral view, the quadrate resembles a hook in immature T. nepaeolicus and T. proriger individuals, but in adult forms for both species and in T. bernardi, T. pembinensis, and T. saskatchweanensis it takes on a robust oval-like shape. The eardrum (tympanum) attached to the lateral surface of the bone within a bowl-like depression called the alar conch. The conch is shallow in T. nepaeolicus, T. proriger, and T. bernardi, and deep in T. pembinensis and T. saskatchewanensis. The alar rim is thin in T. nepaeolicus, T. proriger, and T. bernardi, and thick in T. bernardi, T. pembinensis, and T. saskatchewanensis. The suprastapedial process is a hook-like extension of bone that curves posteroventrally from the apex of the shaft into an incomplete loop, and it likely served as the attachment point for the depressor mandibulae muscles that opened the lower jaw. The process is slender and proportionally long in immature T. nepaeolicus and T. proriger, and thickened as the animals matured. The process is of similar length to T. proriger in T. saskatchwanensis and shorter in T. bernardi. In T. pembinensis, it abruptly turns medially at a 45° downward angle. A similar deflection appears in some juvenile T. nepaeolicus quadrates. Emerging from the posteroventral margin of the alar conch is the infrastapedial process. Its shape appears to changes ontogenetically in T. nepaeolicus and T. proriger; in the former, the process is absent in juveniles but appears as a small bump in adults, while in T. proriger, it is present as a subtle point in juveniles of and becomes a distinctively broad semicircle in adults. The process is small in T. bernardi, and in T. pembinensis and T. saskatchewanensis, it is rounded. In T. saskatchewanensis, the suprastapedial process almost touches the infrastapedial process. At the bottom of the shaft is the mandibular condyle, which forms the joint between the quadrate and the lower jaw. It is rounded in shape in adults. On the medial surface of the bone, a thick, pillar-like vertical ridge often protrudes beyond the dorsal margin of the quadrate so that it is visible in lateral view.

==== Jaws and teeth ====
The upper jaws include the premaxilla and maxilla, and the lower jaws include the dentary, splenial, coronoid, angular, surangular, and prearticluar-articular (like other squamates, the prearticular is fused to the articular). The premaxilla, maxilla, and dentary house the marginal dentition, and the pterygoids house palatal dentition. On each side of the skull, Tylosaurus had 2 premaxillary teeth, 12 to 13 maxillary teeth, 13 dentary teeth, and 10 to 11 pterygoid teeth. The dentition is homodont, meaning that all teeth are nearly identical in size and shape, with the exception of the pterygoid teeth, which are smaller and more recurved than the marginal teeth.

Dentaries were elongate; it is between 56 and 60% of total length of the entire lower jaw in adult T. nepaeolicus and T. proriger, 56-58% in T. kansasensis, and when combined with the overlapping splenial, about 53-57% in T. rex. The bone is robust, though not as strongly built as it is in Mosasaurus, Prognathodon, or Plesiotylosaurus. The tooth-bearing margin ranges from straight to slightly concave. A small dorsal ridge appears anterior to the first dentary tooth in T. proriger and T. rex.

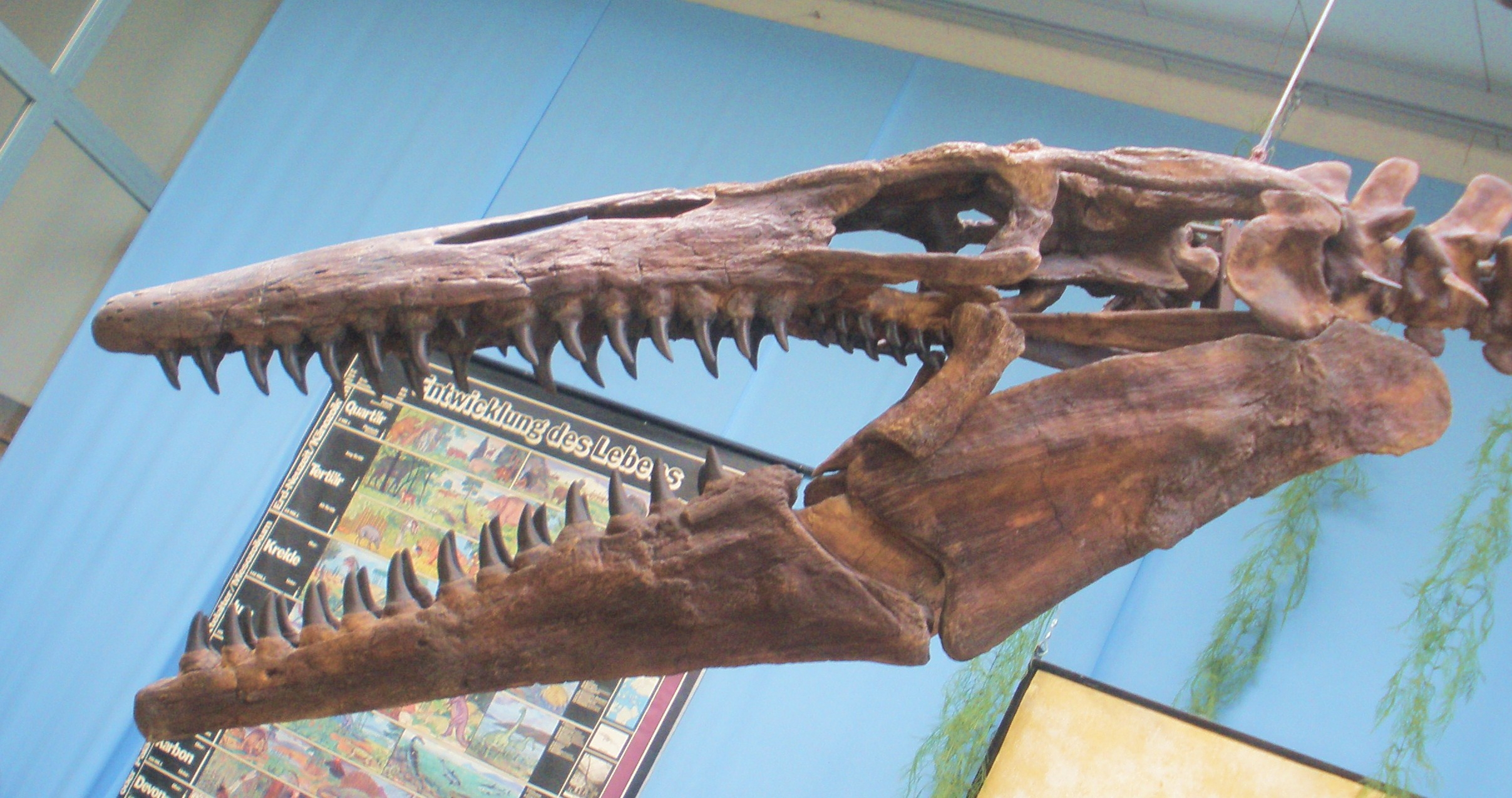
T. rex skull showing both marginal and pterygoid teeth

The marginal dentition of most species is adapted for cutting large marine vertebrates, while those in T. ivoensis appear more optimized for smashing prey, and T. "borealis" for both piercing and cutting. Marginal teeth are triangular with a slight recurve towards the back of the jaws so that the lingual (tongue-facing) side forms a U-shaped curve. From top view, they are compressed at the lingual and labial (lip-facing) sides to form an oval-like shape. Teeth of immature T. proriger are initially compressed, but become conical in adulthood. Carinae (cutting edges) are finely serrated with small denticles in T. rex and sometimes T. proriger, which appear similar to those in Prognathodon and Mosasaurus though not as developed as in theropod dinosaurs or living monitors, and smooth in T. nepaeolicus (Note: Serrations are reported as a trait for T. nepaeolicus by Jiménez-Huidobro et al. (2016), but not found by Zietlow et al. (2026)) and T. kansasensis. The teeth generally have both anterior and posterior carinae, but some anterior teeth may have only anterior carinae. The placement of carinae, if paired, is not always equal; in at least T. proriger and T. ivoensis, they are positioned such that the surface area of the tooth's lingual side is greater than the labial side. The enamel surface is lined with thin fine ridges called striations that run vertically from the tooth's base. The surface is also either smooth or faintly faceted, in which it is flattened into multiple sides to form a prism-like geometry.

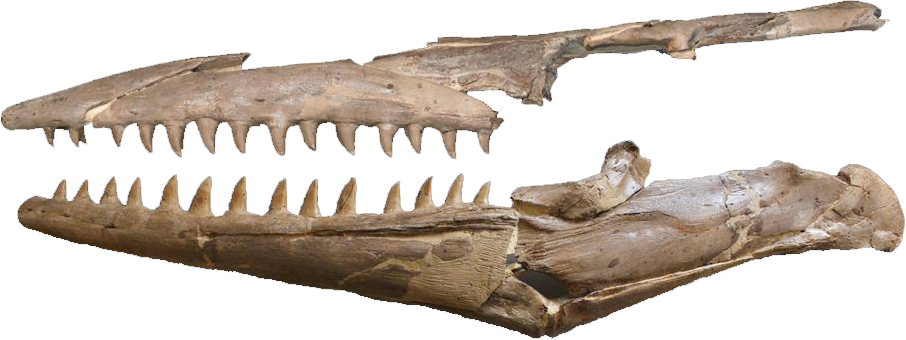
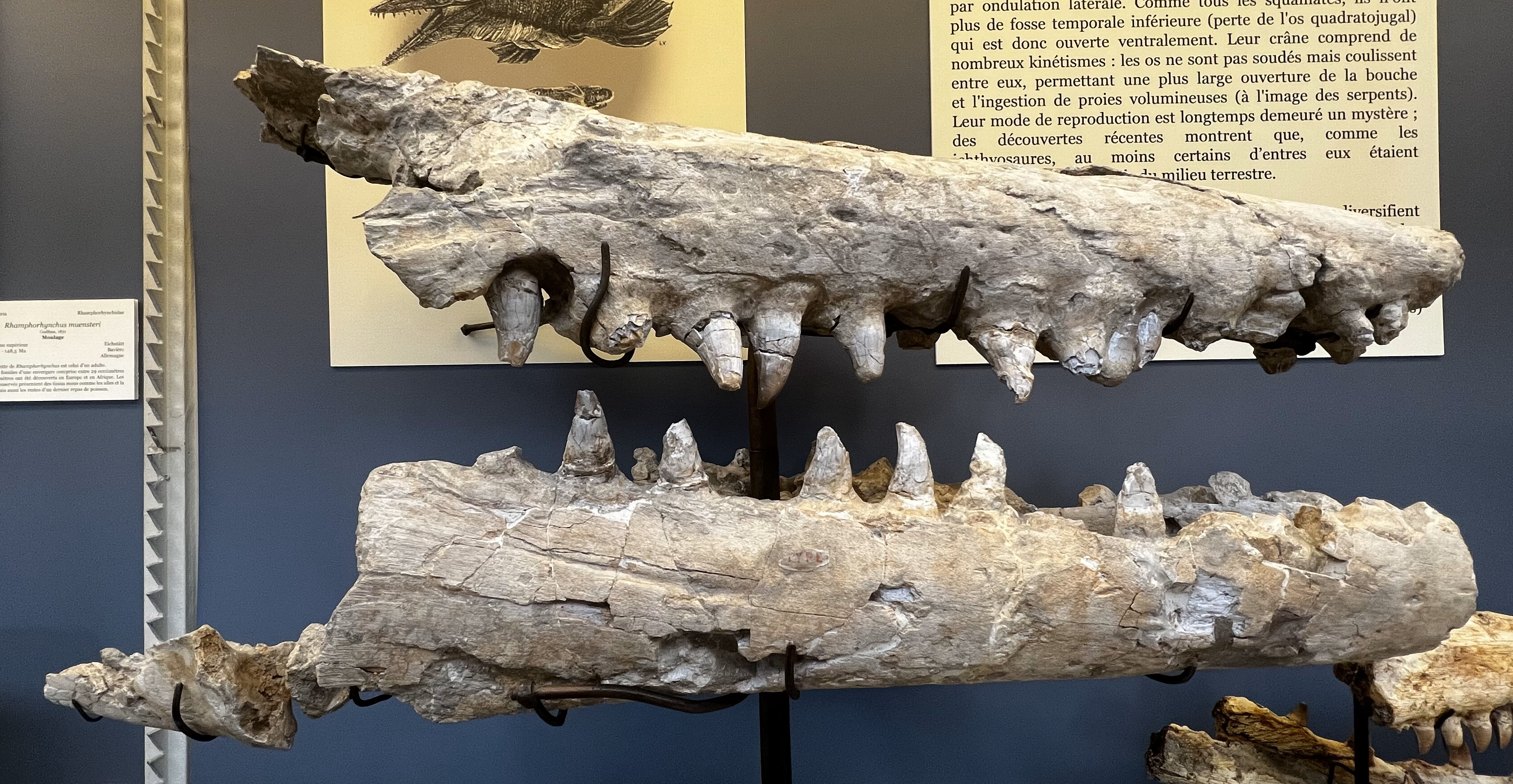
Jaws showing teeth of 'proriger group' T. nepaeolicus (top) and 'ivoensis group' 'T.' gaudryi (bottom)

Bardet et al. (2006) classified Tylosaurus species into two morphological groups based on marginal dentition. The North American 'proriger group' includes T. proriger, T. nepaeolicus, and T. kansasensis (and by extension, T. rex) and is characterized by teeth with smooth or faint facets, less prominent carinae, and a vein-like network of primitive striations extending to near the tip. The group was originally defined as having slender teeth, but subsequent research has since recognized that slenderness is an ontogenetic trait in T. proriger with robust teeth appearing in adult forms. The second is the Euro-American 'ivoensis group' and consists of T. ivoensis, 'T.' gaudryi, and 'T.' pembinensis. Their teeth are robust with prominent carinae with striations on the lingual and occasionally labial sides that do not reach the tooth's tip, and facets on the labial side. The facets are gentle in 'T.' pembinensis, while in T. ivoensis they are slightly concave. The latter feature is also known as fluting. Marginal teeth in 'T.' gaudryi are virtually indistinguishable from those in T. ivoensis. T. iembeensis was not placed within either group; no further description is known of its teeth other than having striations and no facets. The distinction of an 'ivoensis group' is contentious. Caldwell et al. (2008) argued that 'T.' pembinensis cannot be compared with T. ivoensis as the former's teeth are not fluted, and that T. ivoensis is more allied with the distinctively fluted teeth of Taniwhasaurus. Jiménez-Huidobro and Caldwell (2019) listed the absence of marginal fluting as a diagnostic (taxon-identifying) trait that differentiates Tylosaurus from Taniwhasaurus.

Pterygoid teeth are smaller and more recurved than marginal teeth. The bases are nearly circular but divided into a front and back-facing side of near-equal surface area via a pair of faint buccal and lingual cutting edges. This is except in 'T.' gaudryi, where the teeth are compressed at the lingual and labial sides and hold distinct cutting edges at the front and back sides. Cutting edges are not serrated in all named species where it is known. The typical front-facing side is either smooth of faintly faceted, while the back-facing side is striated. Tooth build is robust in at least T. ivoensis.

=== Postcranial skeleton ===
Both pectoral and pelvic girdles are unfused in adult Tylosaurus, in contrast to other taxa (e.g., Prognathodon overtoni). Tylosaurus is also distinguished from other mosasaurs by a scapula that is significantly smaller than the coracoid and the absence of the anterior emargination of the coracoid, as well as the absence of a well-developed pubic tubercle.

Tylosaurus limbs are primitive relative to other mosasaurs; their stylopodia (humeri and femora) lack both the complex muscle attachment sites and extreme proximodistal shortening present in other derived taxa. Both carpals and tarsals in tylosaurines are mostly unossified; while other mosasaurs typically have between three and five carpals and tarsals, adult Tylosaurus never possess more than two ossified carpal bones (usually only the ulnare, sometimes the ulnare and distal carpal four) and two ossified tarsal bones (usually only the astragalus, sometimes the astragalus and distal tarsal four). Hyperphalangy (increased number of phalanges relative to the ancestral condition) is present in both fore- and hindlimbs, and the phalanges are spindle-shaped, unlike the short, blocky hourglass-shaped phalanges possessed by mosasaurines. The pisiform appears to be either unossified or absent in tylosaurines. The functional consequences of differences in limb anatomy across different mosasaur clades is unclear.

Tylosaurus had 29 to 30 presacral vertebrae, 6 to 7 pygal vertebrae, and 89 to 112 caudal vertebrae; due to the lack of a bony articulation between the ilium and vertebral column, it is unclear whether any mosasaurs possessed true sacral vertebrae. In all tylosaurines, like in plioplatecarpines, the chevrons articulate to the caudal vertebrae, and are not fused to them, as they are in mosasaurines. The tail possesses a distinct downward curve, suggesting the presence of a tail fluke.

=== Soft tissue ===
==== Skin and coloration ====
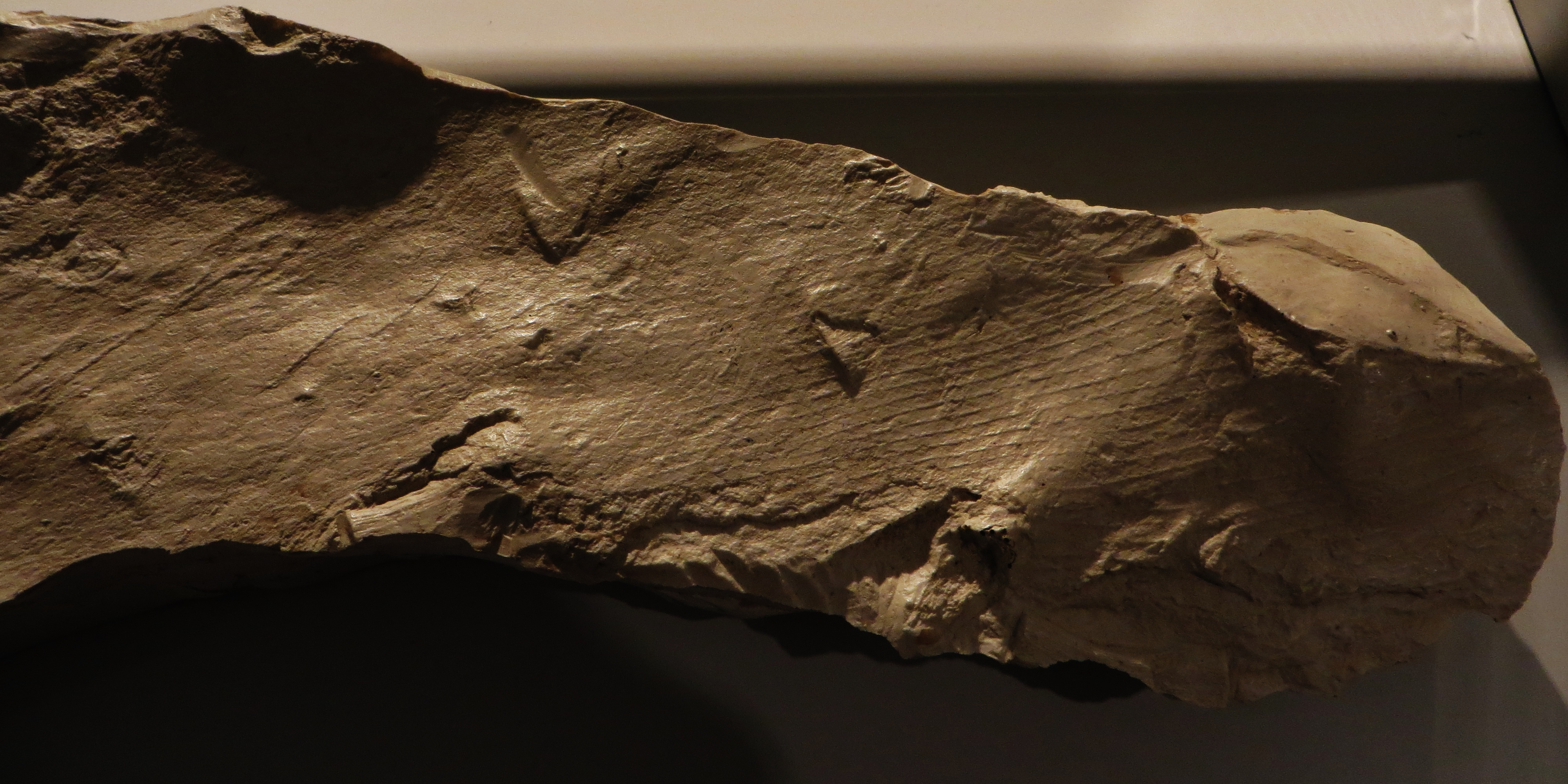
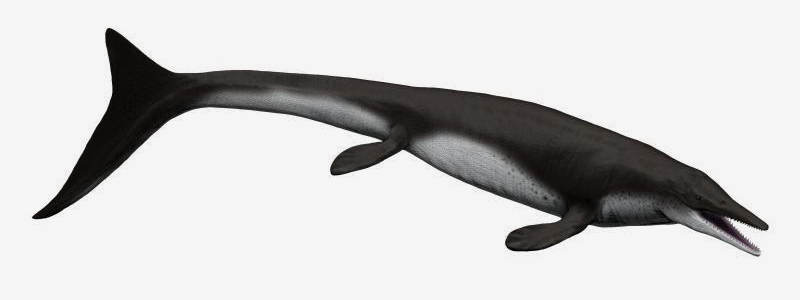
Preserved skin of Tylosaurus (left); restoration of T. nepaeolicus with coloration based on melanosomes found in preserved skin (right)

Fossil evidence of the skin of Tylosaurus in the form of scales has been described since the late 1870s. These scales were small and diamond-shaped and were arranged in oblique rows, comparable to that found in modern rattlesnakes and other related reptiles. However, the scales in the mosasaur were much smaller in proportion to the whole body. An individual measuring 5 meters (16 ft) in total body length had dermal scales measuring 3.3 by 2.5 millimeters (0.130 in × 0.098 in), and in each square inch (2.54 cm) of the mosasaur's underside an average of ninety scales were present. Each scale was keeled in a form resembling that of a shark's denticles. This probably helped reduce underwater drag and reflection on the skin.

Microscopic analysis of scales in a T. nepaeolicus specimen by Lindgren et al. (2014) detected high traces of the pigment eumelanin indicative of a dark coloration similar to the leatherback sea turtle in life. This may have been complemented with countershading, present in many aquatic animals, though the distribution of dark and light pigments in the species remains unknown. A dark-colored form would have provided several evolutionary advantages. Dark coloration increases absorption of heat, allowing the animal to maintain elevated body temperatures in colder environments. Possession of this trait during infancy would in turn facilitate fast growth rates. Unreflective dark coloring and countershading would have provided the mosasaur with increased camouflage. Additional speculative functions includes increased tolerance to solar ultraviolet radiation, strengthened integuments. The study remarked that certain melanism-coding genes are pleiotropic for increased aggression.

==== Respiratory system ====
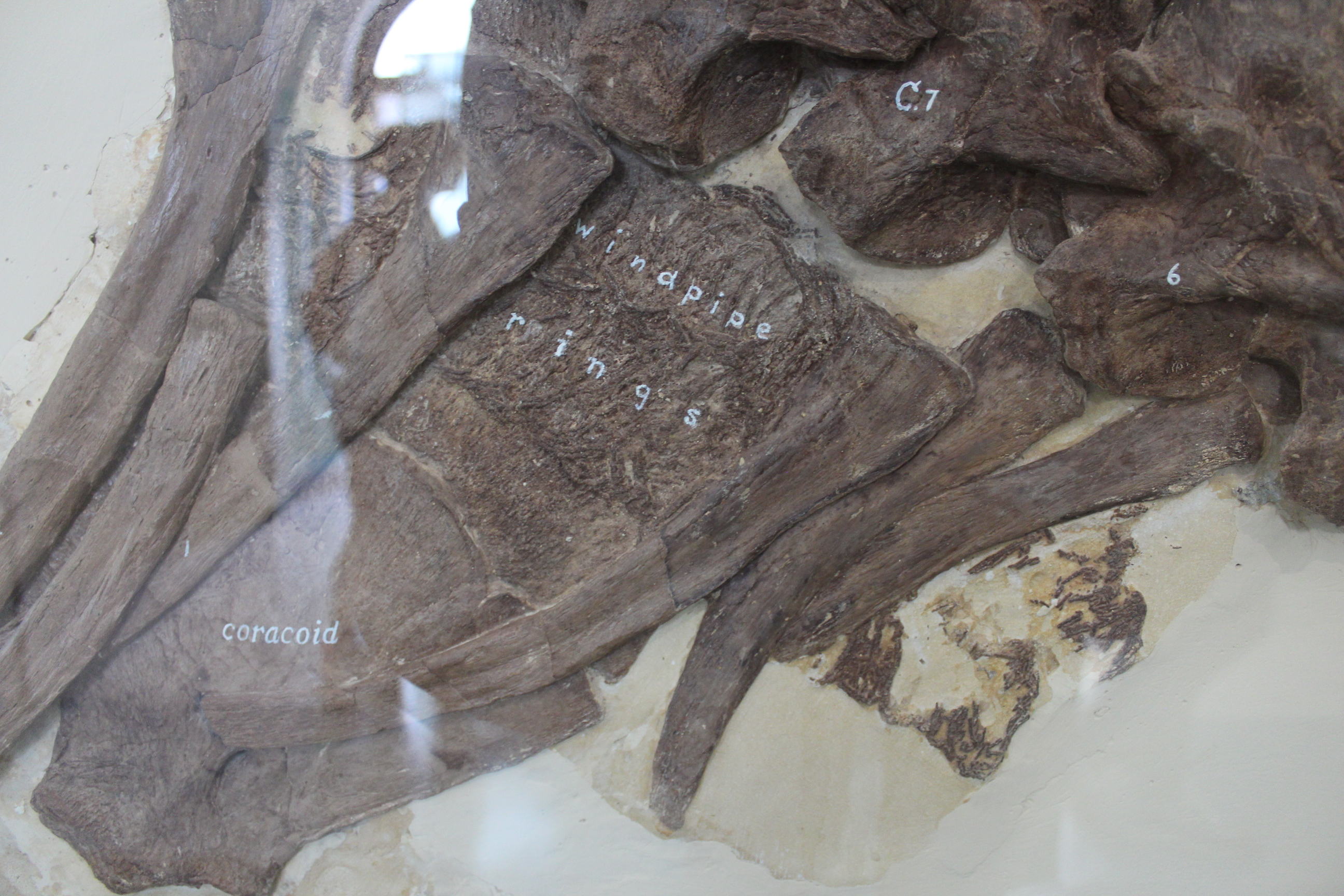
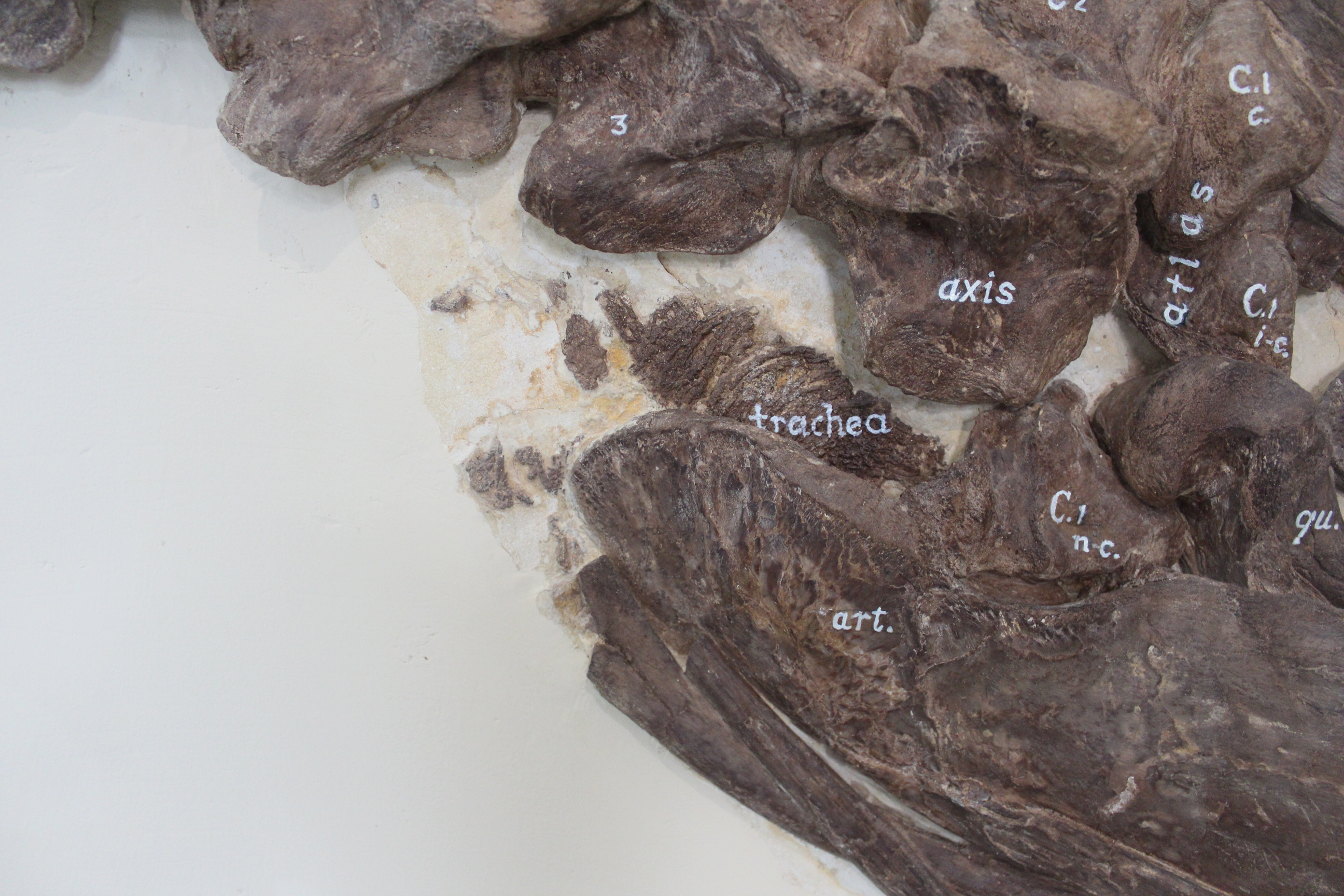
Preserved bronchi (left) and trachea (right) in AMNH FR 221

AMNH FR 221 preserves parts of the cartilaginous respiratory system. This includes parts of the larynx (voice box), trachea (windpipe), and bronchi (lung airways). They were however only briefly described in the preserved position by Osborn (1899). The larynx is poorly preserved; a piece of its cartilage first appears below just between the pterygoid and quadrate and extends to behind the latter. This connects to the trachea, which appears below the atlas vertebra but is not preserved afterwards. The respiratory tract reappears below the fifth rib as a pair of bronchi and extends to just behind the as-preserved coracoids where preservation is lost. The pairing is suggestive of two functional lungs like modern limbed lizards but unlike snakes. Similar branching is also found in Platecarpus and putatively Mosasaurus, the only two other derived mosasaurs with their respiratory systems documented. The bifurcation point for the Tylosaurus specimen is anywhere between the first and sixth cervical vertebrae. (Note: Latter corresponds to the fifth rib in Osborn (1899).) In Platecarpus, the bronchi probably diverged below the sixth cervical into near-parallel pairs, while in Mosasaurus the organ is dislocated. A bifurcation point's position ahead of the forelimbs would be unlike terrestrial lizards, whose point is within the chest region, but similar to the short trachea and parallel bronchi of whales.

== Classification ==
=== Taxonomy ===
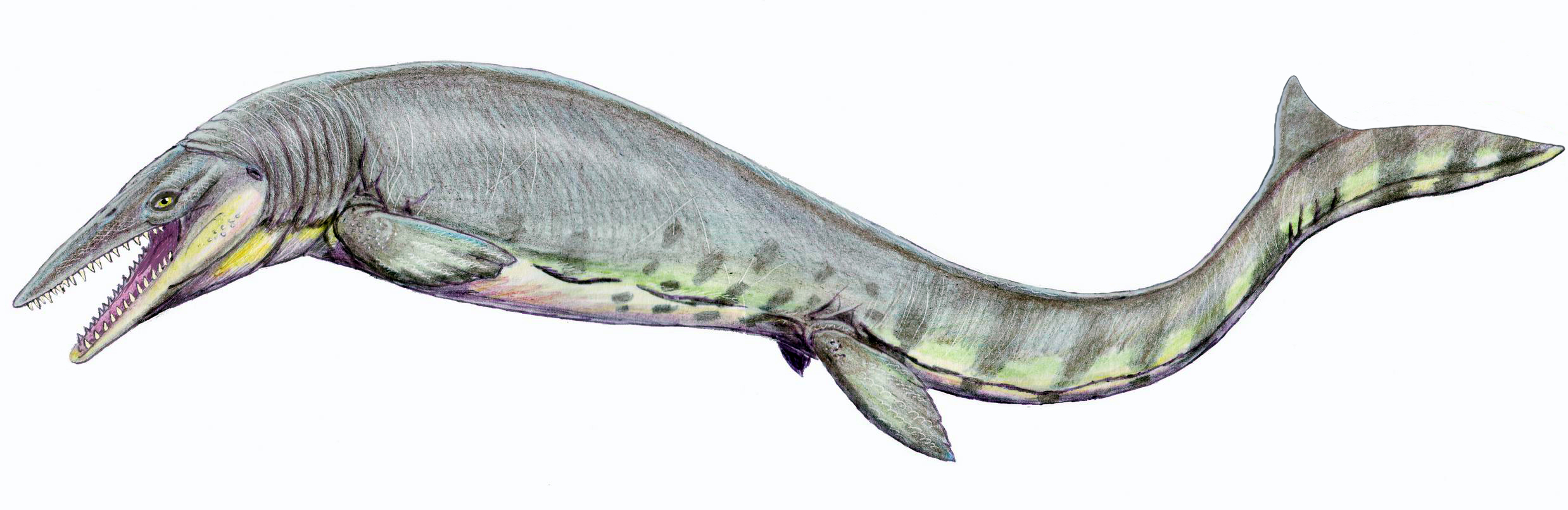
Restoration of T. pembinensis

Tylosaurus is classified within the family Mosasauridae in the superfamily Mosasauroidea. The genus is the type genus of its own subfamily, the Tylosaurinae. Other members of this group include Taniwhasaurus and possibly Kaikaifilu, and the subfamily is defined by a shared feature of an elongated premaxillary rostrum that does not bear teeth. The closest relatives of the Tylosaurinae include the Plioplatecarpinae and the primitive subfamilies Tethysaurinae and Yaguarasaurinae; together they are members of one of three possible major lineages of mosasaurs (the others being the Mosasaurinae subfamily and Halisauromorpha group) that was first recognized in 1993. This clade was named the Russellosaurina by Polcyn and Bell in 2005.

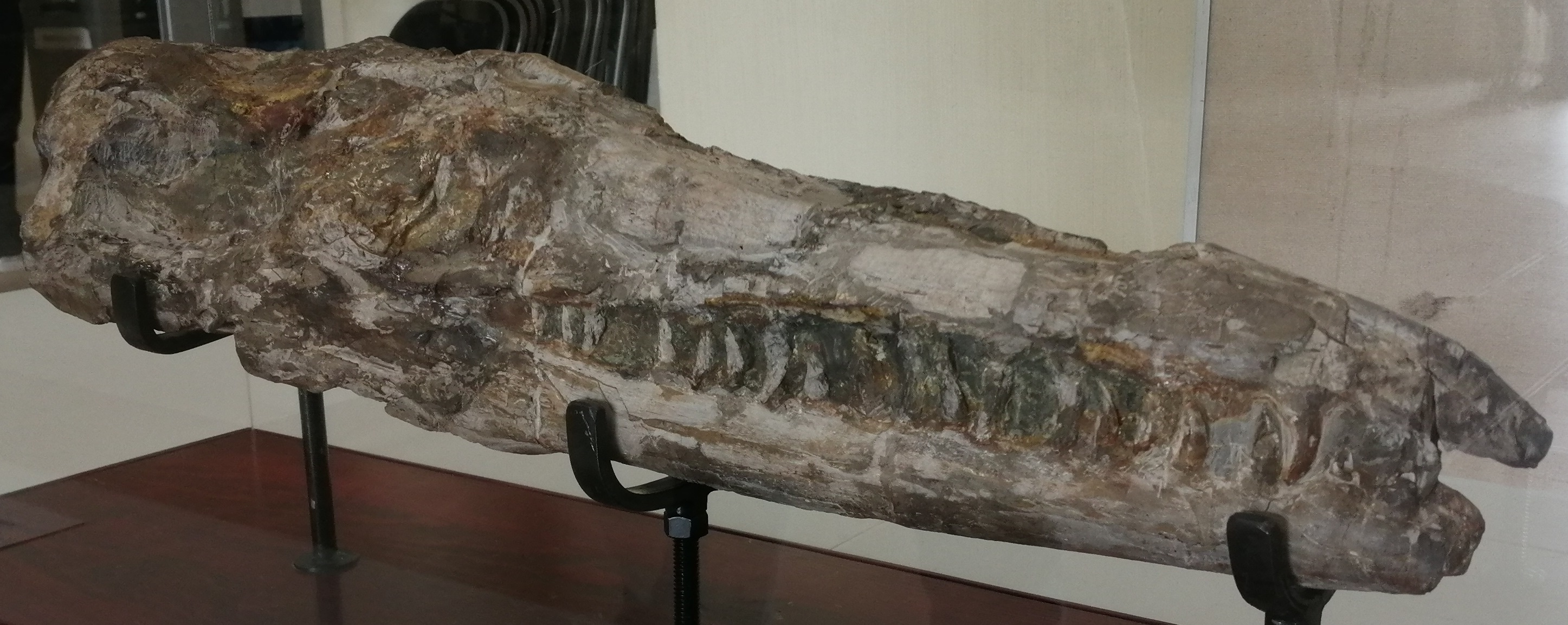
The Turonian-aged skull of T. sp. aff. kansasensis (SGM-M1) is one of the oldest known fossils of Tylosaurus.

Tylosaurus was among the earliest derived mosasaurs. The oldest fossil attributable to the genus is a premaxilla (TMM 40092-27) recovered from Middle Turonian deposits of the Arcadia Park Shale in Texas, which is dated between 92.1 and 91.4 million years old based on correlations with index fossils. Although formally referred to as Tylosaurinae incertae sedis during its first description, it was remarked to probably belong to T. kansasensis. The specimen was later listed within said species in a 2020 reexamination. A slightly younger specimen is of a skull (SGM-M1) of an indeterminate Tylosaurus species similar to T. kansasensis from the Ojinaga Formation in Chihuahua, Mexico, dated around ~90 million years old at earliest. A tooth from a Late Maastrichtian deposit in Nasiłów, Poland dating close to the Cretaceous–Paleogene boundary has been attributed to Hainosaurus sp. With the incorporation of Hainosaurus as a synonym of Tylosaurus, this also makes the genus one of the last mosasaurs. Currently, nine species of Tylosaurus are recognized by scientists as taxonomically valid. They are as follows: T. proriger, T. nepaeolicus, T. bernardi, T. gaudryi, T. ivoensis, T. iembeensis, T. pembinensis, T. saskatchewanensis, and T. rex. The validity of two additional taxa remain unsettled; there is still debate whether T. kansasensis is synonymous with T. nepaeolicus, and T. "borealis" has yet to be described in a formal publication.

=== Phylogeny and evolution ===
Restoration of T. proriger

In 2020, Madzia and Cau performed a Bayesian analysis to better understand the evolutionary influence on early mosasaurs by contemporaneous pliosaurs and polycotylids by examining the rates of evolution in mosasauroids like Tylosaurus (specifically T. proriger, T. nepaeolicus, and T. bernardi). A Bayesian analysis in the study's implementation can approximate numerically defined rates of morphological evolution and ages of divergence of clades. The Tylosaurinae was approximated to have diverged from the Plioplatecarpinae around 93 million years ago; the divergence was characterized by the highest rate of evolution among all mosasaurid lineages. This trend of rapid evolution coincided with the extinction of the pliosaurs and a decrease in polycotylid diversity. The study noted converging traits between Tylosaurus, pliosaurs, and some polycotylids in tooth morphology and body size. However, there was no evidence to suggest that Tylosaurus or its precursors evolved as a result of out-competing and/or driving to extinction the pliosaurs and polycotylids. Instead, Madiza and Cau proposed that Tylosaurus may have taken advantage of the extinction of the pliosaurs and decline of polycotylids to quickly fill the ecological void they left behind. The Bayesian analysis also approximated a divergence of T. nepaeolicus from the rest of the genus around 86.88 million years ago and a divergence between T. proriger and T. bernardi around 83.16 million years ago. The analysis also generated a paraphyletic status of the genus, approximating Taniwhasaurus to have diverged from Tylosaurus around 84.65 million years ago, but this result is not consistent with previous phylogenetic analyses.

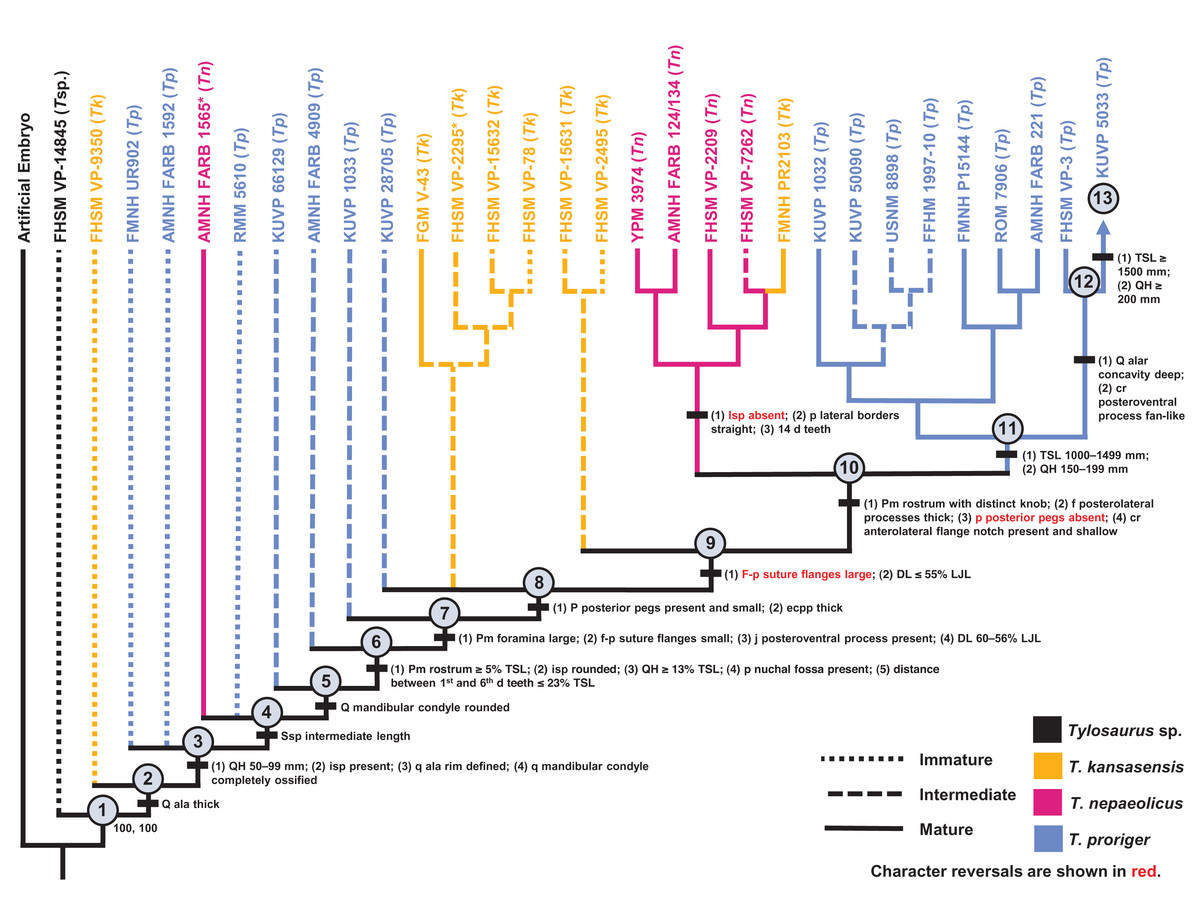
Ontogram demonstrating the evolution of T. nepaeolicus into T. proriger through peramorphosis

In the Western Interior Seaway, two species—T. nepaeolicus and T. proriger—may represent a chronospecies, in which they make up a single lineage that continuously evolves without branching in a process known as anagenesis. This is evident by how the two species do not stratigraphically overlap, are sister species, share minor and intermediate morphological differences such as a gradual change in the development of the quadrate bone, and lived in the same locations. The means by which this lineage evolved has been hypothesized to be through one of two evolutionary mechanisms related to changes in ontogeny. First, Jiménez-Huidobro, Simões, and Caldwell proposed in 2016 that T. proriger evolved as a paedomorph of T. nepaeolicus, in which the descendant arose as a result of morphological changes through the retention of juvenile features of the ancestor in adulthood. This was based on the presence of a frontal crest and convex borders of the parietal bone of the skull shared in both juvenile T. nepaeolicus and all T. proriger but lost in adult T. nepaeolicus. However, an ontogenetic study by Zietlow (2020) found that it was unclear whether this observation was a result of paedomorphosis, although this uncertainty may have been due that the sample size of mature T. nepaeolicus was too low to determine statistical significance. Second, the same study proposed an alternative hypothesis of peramorphosis, in which T. proriger evolved by developing traits found in mature T. nepaeolicus during immaturity. Based on results from a cladistical ontogram developed using data from 74 Tylosaurus specimens, the study identified a multitude of traits that were present in all T. proriger and mature T. nepaeolicus but absent in juvenile T. nepaeolicus: the skull size and depth are large, the length of the elongated rostrum exceeds 5% of the total skull length, the quadrate suprastapedial processes are thick, the overall quadrate shape converges, and the posteroventral process is fan-like.

The following cladograms are modified from phylogenetic analyses by Jiménez-Huidobro & Caldwell (2019) and Zietlow et al. (2026) respectively. Topology A used Tylosaurus species with sufficiently known material to model accurate relationships in a 128-character matrix; T. gaudryi, T. ivoensis, and T. iembeensis were excluded from the analysis due to extensive missing data (i.e., lack of material with scoreable phylogenetic characters). Topology B implements a revised 180-character matrix, which enabled the inclusion of several taxa absent from prior studies, and suggests the existence of a distinct Hainosaurus clade within a paraphyletic Tylosaurus along with a highly derived position for Taniwhasaurus within said paraphyly. However, the authors note that this represents a preliminary result of a work in progress matrix, and that future analyses with the inclusion of additional characters and taxa may lead to different results.

Topology A: Jiménez-Huidobro & Caldwell (2019), with 128 phylogenetic characters

- - Aigialosaurus
  - - Komensaurus carrolli
    - - Russellosaurina
        - - Tethysaurinae
          - Yaguarasaurinae
        - - Tylosaurinae
            - - Taniwhasaurus oweni
              - Taniwhasaurus antarcticus
            - - Tylosaurus nepaeolicus
              - - - Tylosaurus proriger
                  - Tylosaurus bernardi
                - - Tylosaurus pembinensis
                  - Tylosaurus saskatchewanensis
          - Plioplatecarpinae
      - - Halisaurinae
        - Mosasaurinae

Topology B: Zietlow et al. (2026), with revised 180 phylogenetic characters

- - Komodo dragon
  - - - Aigialosauridae
    - - Tylosaurinae
        - Tylosaurus nepaeolicus
        - - Tylosaurus kansasensis
          - - Tylosaurus proriger
            - - Tylosaurus rex
              - - - Hainosaurus bernardi
                  - - Hainosaurus gaudryi
                    - - Tylosaurus saskatchewanensis
                      - - Hainosaurus neumilleri
                        - Hainosaurus pembinensis
                - - Taniwhasaurus oweni
                  - Taniwhasaurus antarcticus
      - Mosasaurinae

== Paleobiology ==
=== Function of edentulous rostrum ===
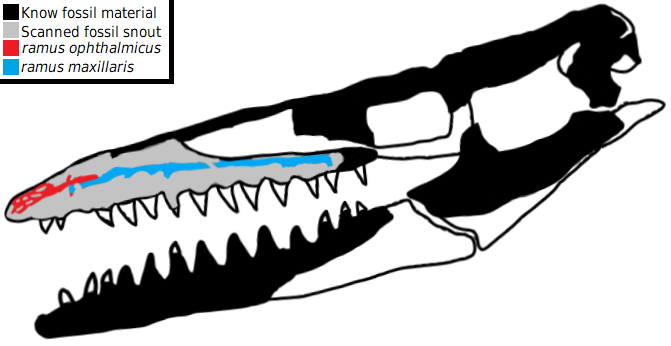
Reconstruction of CT scans of a Taniwhasaurus skull, with the ophthalmic nerve (ramus ophthalmicus) in red

Russell (1967) first speculated the elongated rostrum was used to "stun" prey or defend against sharks, though provided no further explanation. This combat hypothesis was further elaborated in Lingham-Soliar's (1992) review of Tylosaurus biomechanics. He observed that the internarial bar was unusually robust for a mosasaur, and sutured to the frontal with deep interdigitations such that there is a large interfacial shear area. This probably allowed for greater resistance to bending, shearing, and breaking forces though more effective shock absorption and stress transfer from a blunt force to the rostrum. In T. bernardi, T. gaudryi, and some individuals of other species as early-evolving as T. nepaeolicus, the suture between the premaxilla and maxilla is also secured with a double buttress, which would allow the rostrum to lock in place upon a frontal force, with the elongation of the rostrum serving as a strut between the two bones. Lingham-Soliar reasoned that such biomechanical adaptations allowed Tylosaurus to use its rostrum as a battering ram. This possible function was analogized to ramming behaviors seen in modern crocodiles during male-male combat, bottlenose dolphins to kill or deter sharks, and orcas to attack prey. Lingham-Soliar (1998) would later suggest possible evidence of a ram-attack in action in the skull of a subadult Mosasaurus whose braincase was fractured in life by a concentrated force, which he argued was rammed by a T. bernardi due to lack of damage elsewhere in the skull that would indicate other causes of injury. Lingham-Soliar doubted that the elongated rostrum was involved in sexual selection, such as male-male combat, as previous surveys of Tylosaurus skulls found no evidence of sexual dimorphism in the length of the rostrum. This was supported by Konishi et al.'s (2018) finding that the edentulous rostrum began to grow exceptionally early in development, which should not occur if the trait was sexual in nature but reasonable for general-purpose use like ramming. Likewise, Zietlow (2020) found no evidence of sexual dimorphism relating to rostrum growth.

An alternate hypothesis holds that the rostrum was used as a sensory tool. It was long known since Russell (1967) that the edentulous region of the rostrum contains numerous foramen that housed exits for the ophthalmic nerve, which transmits sensory information from the skin to the brain. But that the elongated rostrum specifically functioned for sensation was first advanced by Álvarez–Herrera et al. (2020) based on CT scans of a Taniwhasaurus skull. They discovered a large network of internal canals of the ophthalmic nerve along the rostrum with up to 16 branching terminals inside the front end of the premaxilla, half of which exit into external foramina that dot the front and dorsal surfaces of the bone's edentulous region. This pattern was later found in preliminary CT scans of a T. nepaeolicus skull by Paulina-Carabajal et al. (2023), which similarly observed profuse branching of the ophthalmic nerve inside the premaxilla exiting through many foramina on the dorsal tip of the rostrum. The high concentration of sensory nerves within the edentulous portion of the rostrum suggests that it housed a mechanosensory or electrosensory organ. Similar adaptations were previously found in plesiosaurs and ichthyosaurs. It was also suggested that the heavy branching inside the rostrum is associated with pathways for blood supply, and therefore a thermoregulation mechanism. Paleontologist Gordon Bell remarked in 2002 that any injuries to the snout, such as if inflicted via ramming, would have been extremely painful due to the nerve endings.

=== Growth and development ===
The ontogenetic history of Tylosaurus remains poorly researched despite the wealth of specimens including of juveniles. Scientists who have attempted to study the topic found obtaining the samples needed for an ideal analysis to be difficult as many Tylosaurus specimens are scattered across the globe due to early cross-museum trading and because museums are hesitant to provide many specimens for methods that require examination of internal bone anatomy which necessarily damages the fossil. Several insights have been made nonetheless. Mosasaurs like Tylosaurus likely gave birth to live young. While no evidence has been attributed to Tylosaurus specifically, live birth has been documented in other mosasauroids, including pregnant fossils of the fellow russellosaurine Plioplatecarpus and aigialosaur Carsosaurus, and fossils of newborn Clidastes in open water deposits. The youngest known Tylosaurus individual (FHSM VP-14845) is a newborn (neonate) estimated to have measured 30 cm (12 in) in skull length and 2.23 m (7.3 ft) in total length, about 17.2% the size of Bunker and 24.8–27.9% of the estimated maximum lengths for T. nepaeolicus. The premaxilla of this specimen lacked an edentulous elongation of the rostrum; this trait already appears in juvenile specimens only slightly larger than FHSM VP-14845, including T. nepaeolicus and T. proriger specimens with estimated skull lengths of 40 cm (16 in) and 60 cm (24 in) respectively.

Growth curve and sexual maturity based on the histology of LAGs

A 2007 study by Pellegrini applied skeletochronology on the humeri of two juvenile Tylosaurus sp. specimens to measure the growth rates based on lines of arrested growth (LAGs). In poikilothermic sauropsids, bone growth tends to slow or freeze seasonally, either due to physiological cycles or in response to seasonal change in their environment. This creates a thin layer of avascular tissue called an annulus that, when deposited as a single line due to near-complete cease of growth, is called an LAG. The seasonal nature of LAG deposition can therefore proxy as annual growth rings, and measuring the amount of bone deposition during growing seasons via the distance of each LAG from the center of the bone can infer the animal's growth rate each year starting from the first year of life. (Note: However, LAGs can also be destroyed in life via bone remodeling. Pellegrini's original sample also included two tibia, but he found that too many LAGs were lost in both specimens to be reliable. He also found evidence that one or two LAGs were lost in the humeri specimens.) The older humerus in Pellegrini's sample indicated the individual was 14 years old at death while the younger was aged 7 years. Both showed similar logarithmic growth curves that grew rapidly in the first few years but reduced to a steadier rate starting year 5 in the older specimen and year 6 in the younger. This may represent the ages when the individuals reached sexual maturity. The distance of first-year LAGs to the bone center in both specimens were longer than those in Platecarpus and Clidastes humeri, which suggests that Tylosaurus was larger at birth rather than being born at a similar size and then growing more rapidly. Like the other two mosasaurs, the overall growth rate was similar to modern monitor lizards but accelerated, which Pellegrini attributed to the need for increased metabolic rates to adapt to an aquatic environment.

A 2018 study by Stewart and Mallon attempted to assess the degree of allometry in the growth of the T. proriger skull based on fifteen specimens. Their analysis of covariance test failed to reject isometry from five of the seven skull variables tested. The two definitively shown to be allometric were length of the edentulous rostrum (grew proportionally smaller with age) and height of the quadrate (grew proportionally larger with age). The isometric results were interpreted as most likely an artifact of low sample size, also known as "soft isometry", and the authors maintained that a larger sample size could reveal allometry in the five other variables. The negative allometry found for the edentulous rostrum was also unexpected, as it contradicted prior observations that juvenile Tylosaurus tended to have shorter rostrums than adults.

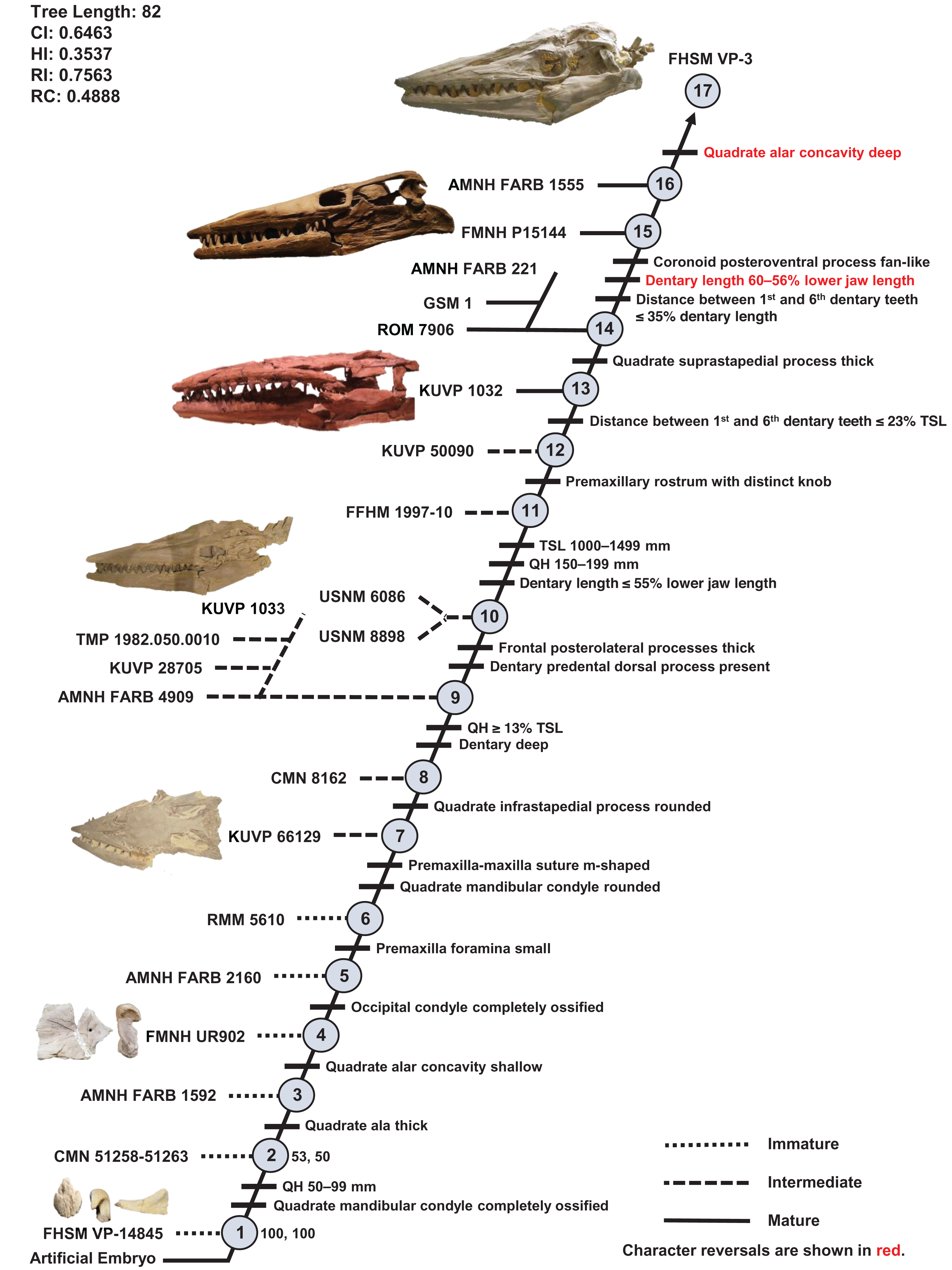
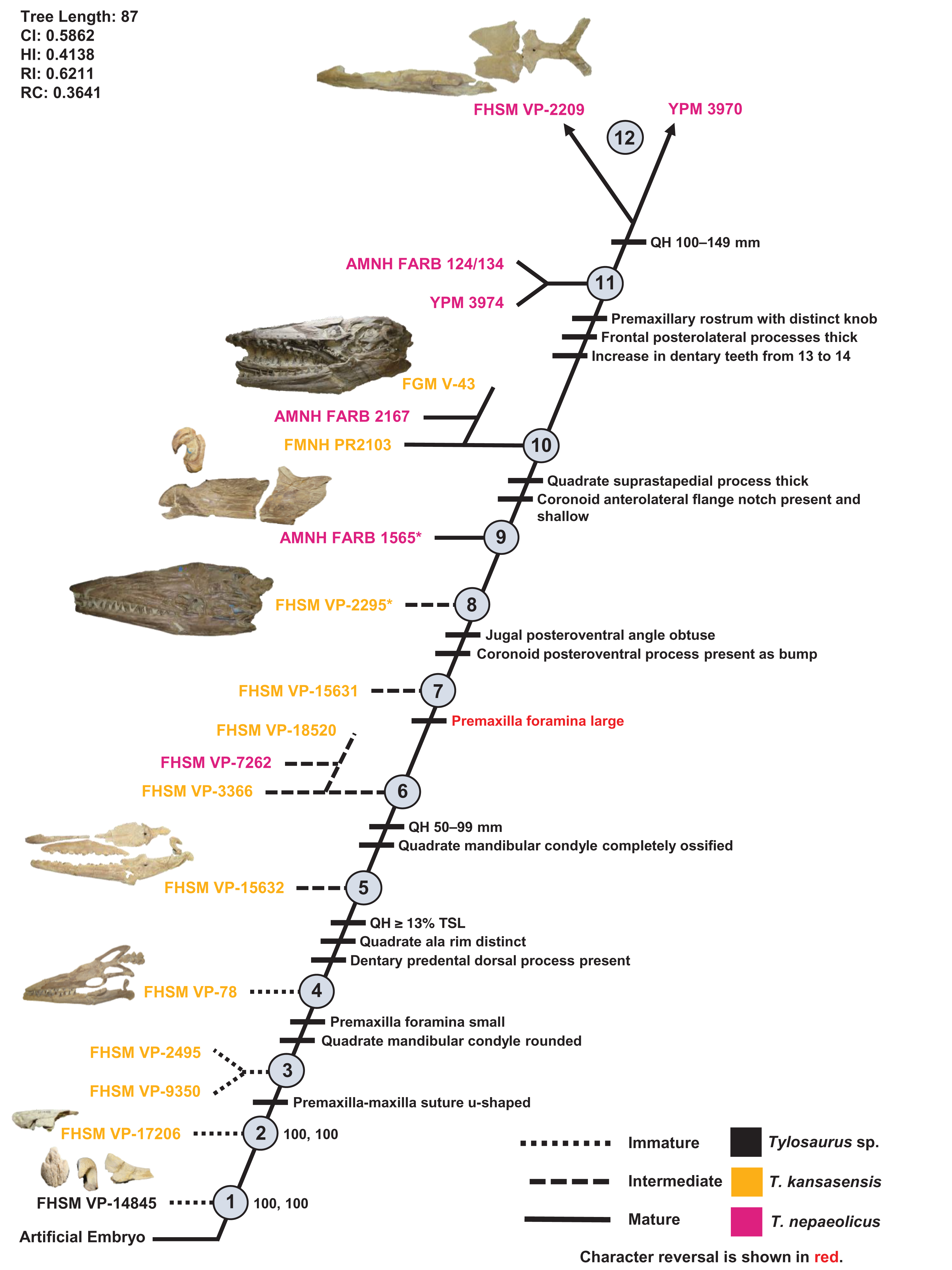
Ontograms of T. proriger (left) and T. nepaeolicus/kansasensis (right)

A 2020 study by Zietlow used cladistic analysis to reconstruct ontograms (growth series charts) of the skull in T. proriger, T. nepaeolicus, and T. kansasensis based on 79 specimens. This approach tracks morphological changes with maturity although, it does not correlate them to particular ages. The resulting ontogram for T. proriger yielded 17 growth series. The most notable changes included the appearance of bony processes on the several bones of the skull, shrinking of the premaxillary foramina, ossification of the basioccipital and quadrate, reshaping of the premaxilla-maxilla suture to an M-shape, and increase in tooth size relative to the skull. T. nepaeolicus and T. kansasensis was coalesced into a single ontogram to test whether they were a single species. The result showed no evidence of separation; instead, the T. kansasensis specimens were recovered at the earlier stages and T. nepaeolicus at the later stages over a total of 12 growth series. The most notable changes were the enlargement of bony processes in several bones, enlargement of the premaxillary foramina, change in pterygoid shape, ossification of the quadrate and change from a hook-like to elongate shape, development of the M-shape in the premaxilla-maxilla suture, development of an extra dentary tooth, and increase in tooth size relative to the skull. Skull size in both ontograms as well as skull depth in T. proriger progressively increased through all growth stages. Statistical tests showed that both total skull length and quadrate height are reliably correlated with maturity in T. proriger and T. nepaeolicus/kansasensis. Neither ontogram showed evidence of sexual dimorphism, although Zietlow held that this is either an artifact of small sample size or because sex-differentiation does not manifest in the skull.

Zietlow subsequently tested whether the identified ontogenetic traits remains supported under a new paradigm that assumes Tylosaurus developmental sequences should be consistent with close relatives, namely monitor lizards, and amniotes broadly. In a 2024 conference, she reported that ontogenetic change in quadrate shape is inconsistent with monitor lizard development, and that one previously proposed ontogenetic change, the migration of the parietal foramina, is biologically impossible under standard amniote embryogenesis. Zietlow also found that several traits she previously interpreted as part of growth stages in T. proriger and T. nepaeolicus in her 2020 study were actually interspecific variation, suggesting that T. kansasensis was not an immature form of T. nepaeolicus, that their associated ontogram also contained a new species, and that her T. proriger ontogram was an amalgamation of T. proriger and another new species, which was later described as T. rex.

=== Metabolism ===
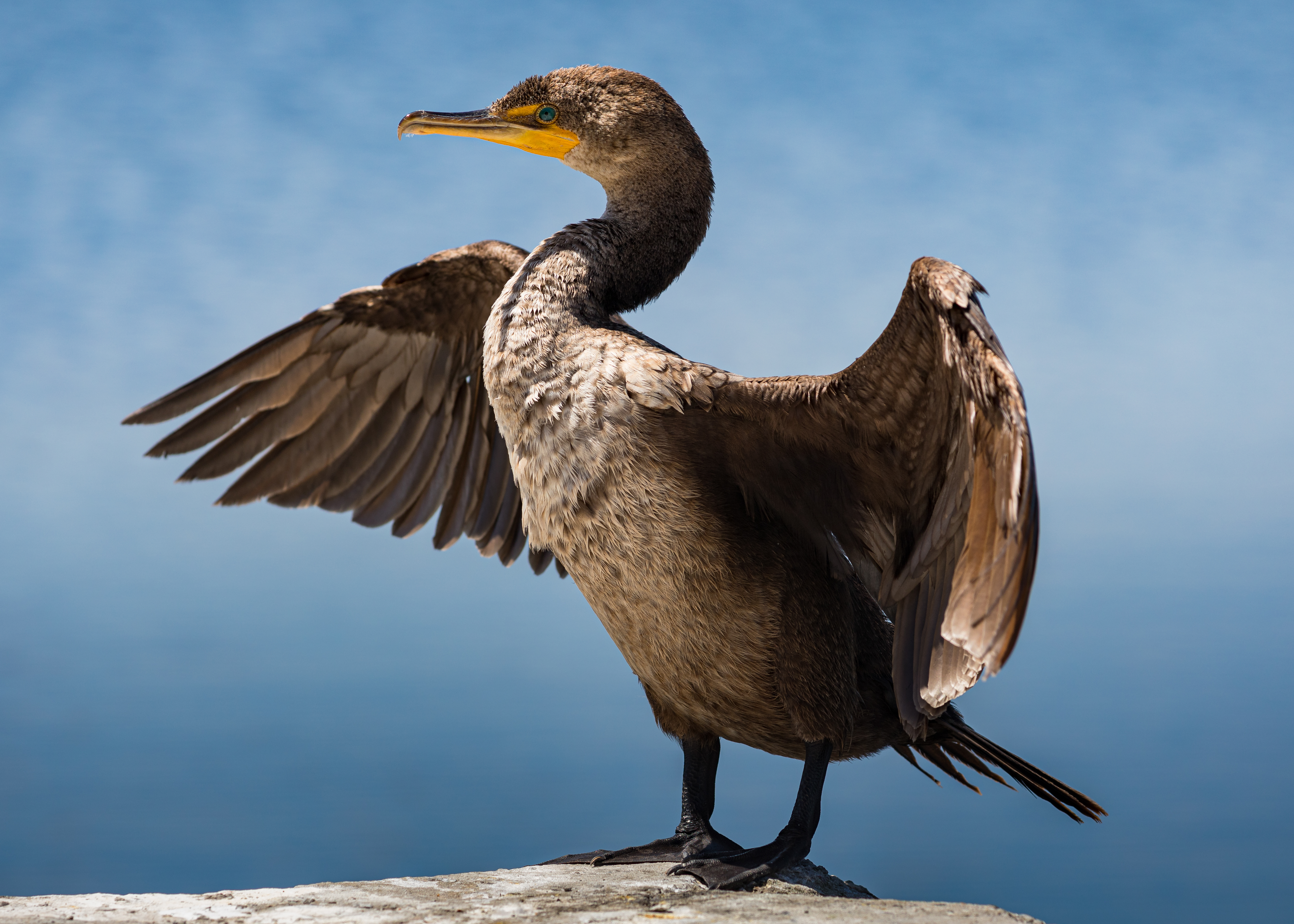
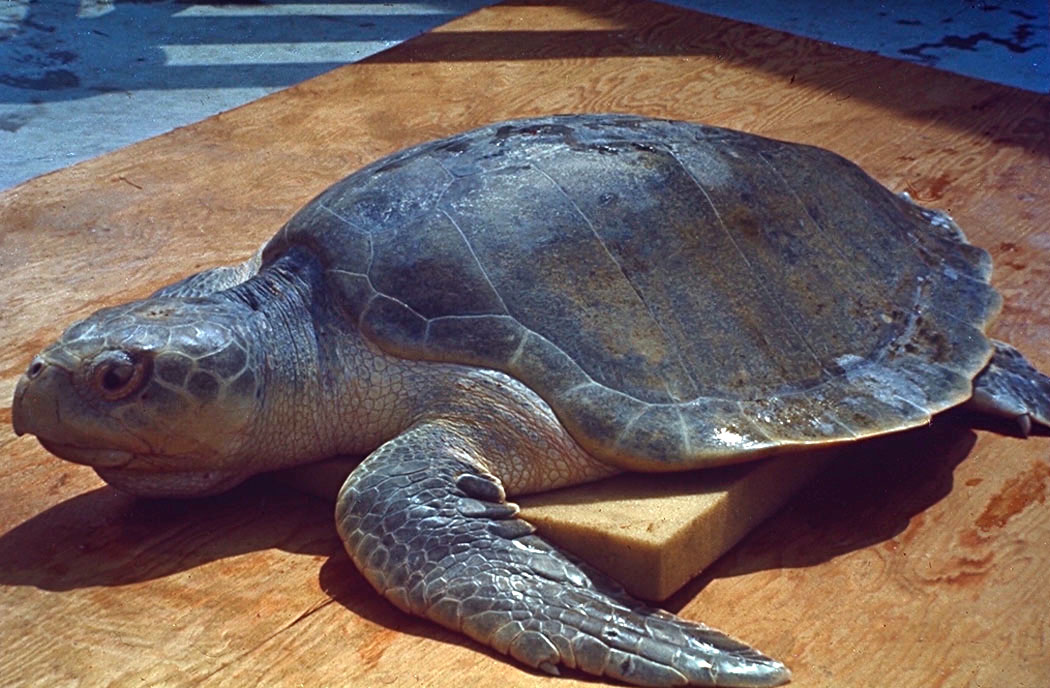
Tylosaurus was warm-blooded and maintained a body temperature closer to seabirds (left) than cold-blooded sea turtles (right).

Nearly all squamates are characterized by their cold-blooded ectothermic metabolism, but mosasaurs like Tylosaurus are unique in that they were likely endothermic, or warm-blooded. The only other known lizard with such a trait is the Argentine black and white tegu, though only partially. Endothermy in Tylosaurus was demonstrated in a 2016 study by Harrell, Pérez‐Huerta, and Suarez by examining δ^{18}O isotopes in Tylosaurus bones. δ^{18}O levels can be used to calculate the internal body temperature of animals, and by comparing such calculated temperatures between coexisting cold-blooded and warm-blooded animals, the type of metabolism can be inferred. The study used the body temperatures of the cold-blooded fish Enchodus and sea turtle Toxochelys (correlated with ocean temperatures) and warm-blooded seabird Ichthyornis from the Mooreville Chalk as a proxy. Analyzing the isotope levels of eleven Tylosaurus specimens an average internal body temperature of 34.3 °C (93.7 °F) was calculated. This was much higher than the body temperature of Enchodus and Toxochelys (28.3 °C (82.9 °F) and 27.2 °C (81.0 °F) respectively) and similar to that of Ichthyornis (38.6 °C (101.5 °F)). Harrell, Pérez‐Huerta, and Suarez also calculated the body temperatures of Platecarpus and Clidastes with similar numbers, 36.3 °C (97.3 °F) and 33.1 °C (91.6 °F) respectively. The fact that the other mosasaurs were much smaller in size than Tylosaurus and yet maintained similar body temperatures made it unlikely that Tylosaurus's body temperature was the result of another metabolic type like gigantothermy. (Note: The 2018 MS thesis of Cyrus Green disputes the notion that Clidastes was an endotherm based on the skeletochronology of the genus, finding that its growth rates were too low to be endothermic and instead similar to ectotherms. The dissertation argued that the high body temperatures calculated by Harrell et al. (2016) were a result of gigantothermy. However, only four specimens were studied, and Clidastes is considered a basal mosasaur.) Endothermy would have provided several advantages to Tylosaurus such as increased stamina for foraging larger areas and pursuing prey, the ability to access colder waters, and better adaptation to withstand the gradual cooling of global temperatures during the Late Cretaceous. A 2026 study reconstructed the thermoregulatory modes of Tylosaurus and the related Platecarpus from the Smoky Hill Chalk Member of the Niobrara Formation on the basis stable oxygen isotope composition of their tooth enamel which was also interpreted as consistent with endothermy.

=== Mobility ===
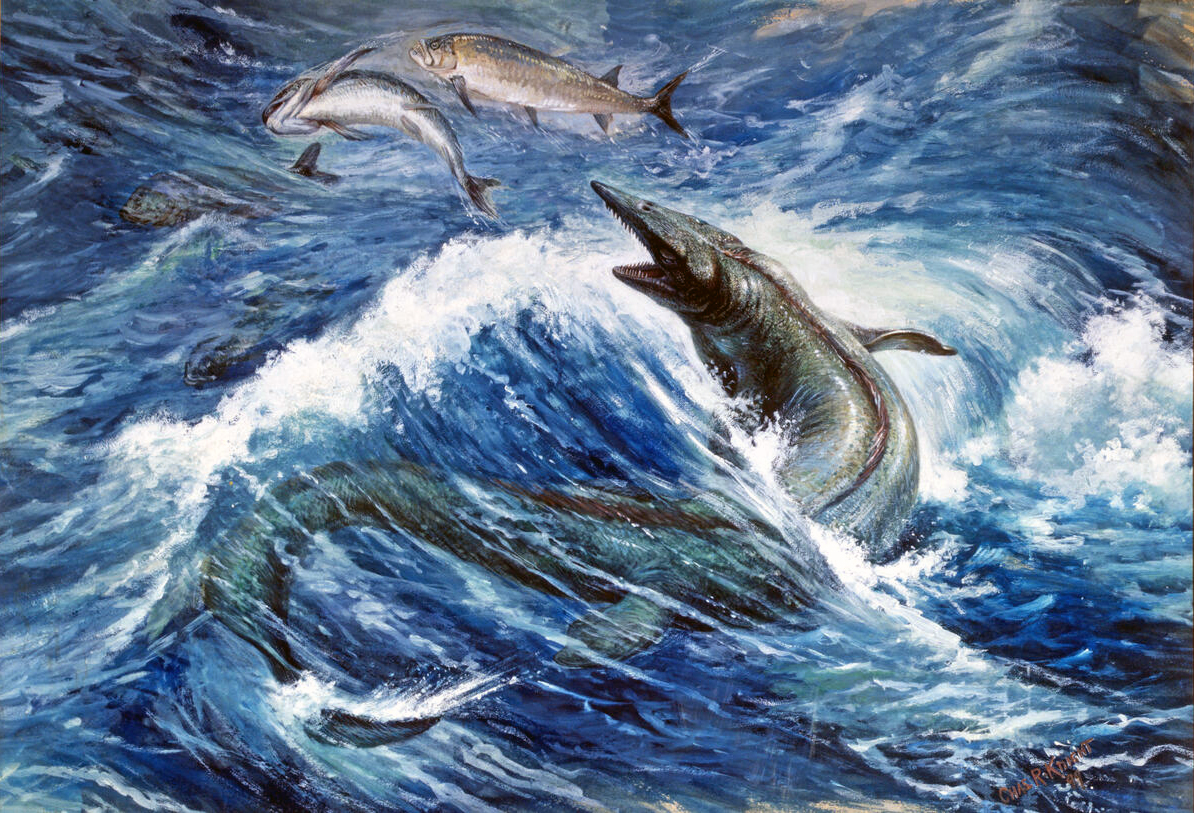
Historical restoration by Charles R. Knight (1899), showing T. proriger twisting to catch a fish

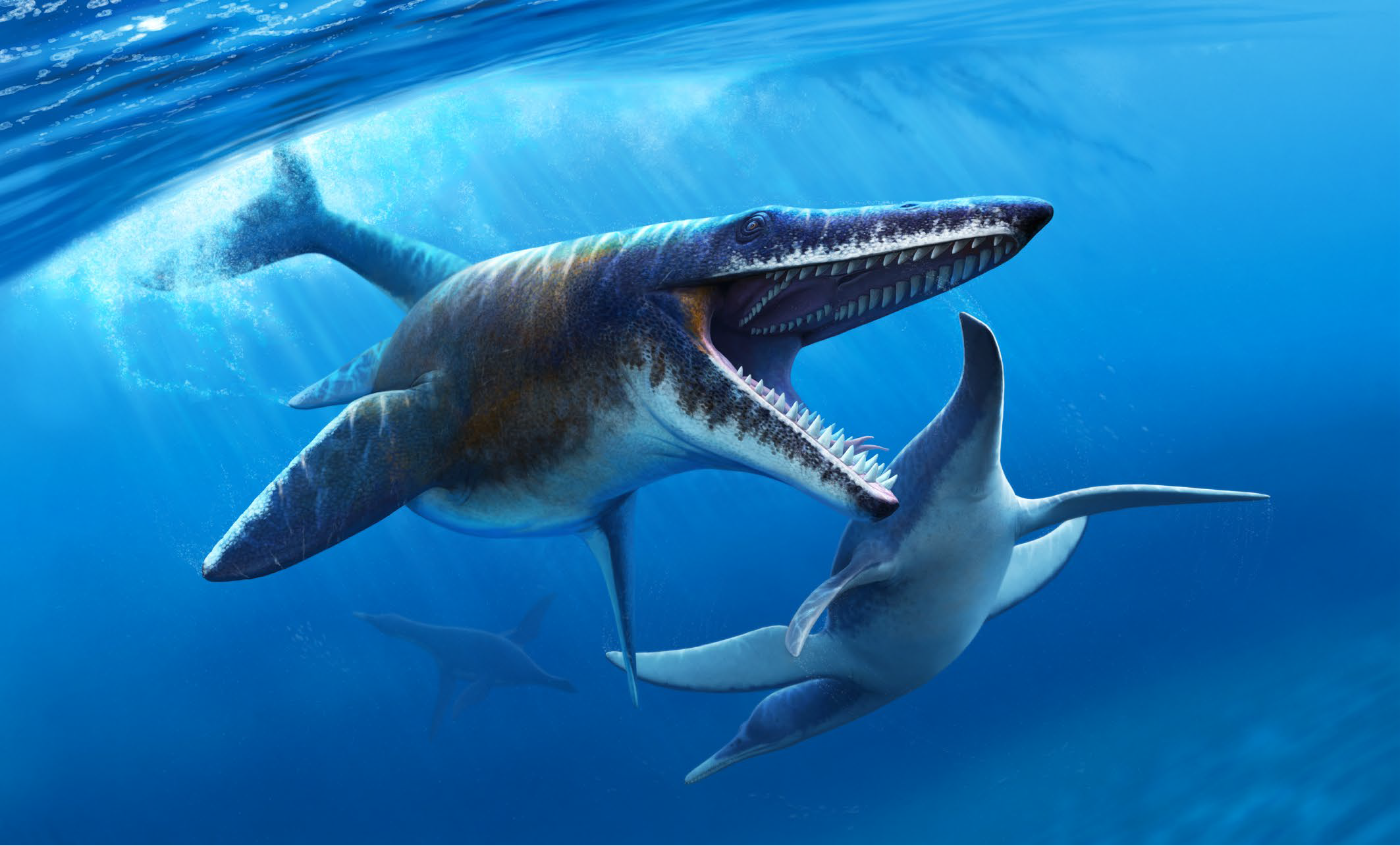
Modern restoration by Andrey Atuchin (2026) of a more rigid T. proriger hunting a polycotylid plesiosaur

Scientists previously interpreted Tylosaurus as an anguilliform swimmer that moved by undulating its entire body like a snake due to its close relationship with the animal. However, it is now understood that Tylosaurus actually used carangiform locomotion, meaning that the upper body was less flexible and movement was largely concentrated at the tail like in mackerels. This is corroborated by a statistical reconstruction of the tail fin by Song and Lindgren (2025), which predicted an outline resembling those in carangiform sharks. A BS thesis by Jesse Carpenter published in 2017 examined the vertebral mobility of T. proriger spinal columns and found that the dorsal vertebrae were relatively rigid but the cervical, pygal, and caudal vertebrae were more liberal in movement, indicating flexibility in the neck, hip, and tail regions. This contrasted with more derived mosasaurs like Plotosaurus, whose vertebral column was stiff up to the hip. Interestingly, an examination of a juvenile T. proriger found that its cervical and dorsal vertebrae were much stiffer than those in adult specimens. This may have been an evolutionary adaptation among young individuals; a more rigid tail-based locomotion is associated with faster speed, and this would allow vulnerable juveniles to better escape predators or catch prey. Older individuals would see their spine grow in flexibility as predator evasion becomes less important for survival.

Tylosaurus likely specialized as an ambush predator. It was lightweight for a mosasaur of its size, having a morphological build designed to vastly reduce body mass and density. Its pectoral and pelvic girdles and paddles, which are associated with weight, are proportionally small. Its bones were highly cancellous and were likely filled with fat cells in life, which also increased buoyancy. It is unlikely that the latter trait was evolved in response to increasing body size as the similarly sized Mosasaurus hoffmannii lacked highly cancellous bone. These traits allowed Tylosaurus to be more conservative in its energy requirements, which is useful when traveling between ambush sites over large distances or through stealth. In addition, a reduced body density likely helped Tylosaurus to rapidly accelerate during an attack, assisted with the long and powerful tail of the mosasaur.

Two studies have sought to estimate swimming speed. The first was in 1988 by Judith Massare, who attempted to calculate the sustained swimming speed, the speed at which the animal moves without tiring, of Tylosaurus through a series of mathematical models incorporating hydrodynamic characteristics and estimations of locomotive efficiency and metabolic costs. Using T. proriger specimens 6.32–6.46 meters (20.7–21.2 ft) long, she calculated an average maximum sustained swimming speed of 2.32 m/s (5.2 mph). However, a cross-check of the models found them to be exaggerated likely due to underestimation of drag and similar variables, which were difficult to estimate for extinct species at the time. Massare predicted that the actual sustained swimming speed was somewhere near half the calculated speed. The second was in 2026 by Formoso and colleagues, which used skeletal and musculature reconstructions to model the burst speed from a single tail swish. They calculated that, from a swish under optimal (Note: 500 watts per kilogram of power applied from a 120° tail curl in a drag environment similar to a sei whale's) conditions, a T. proriger the size of AMNH FR 221 can achieve a burst speed of 6.09 meters per second (13.6 mph), and a T. rex the size of Bunker a burst speed of 6.66 meters per second (14.9 mph). This was nearly twice the speed of comparable advanced mosasaurines (Mosasaurus and Plotosaurus), which yielded speeds between 2.6–3.98 meters per second (5.8–8.9 mph), but slower than a 5.67 meters (18.6 feet) long Platecarpus at 6.77 meters per second (15.1 mph). These yields added further support to the hypothesis that Tylosaurus was an ambush predator.

=== Feeding ===
Schematic of the gut content in a single Tylosaurus (SDSM 10439)

One of the largest marine carnivores of its time, Tylosaurus was an apex predator that exploited the wide variety of species in the marine fauna of its ecosystem. Stomach contents are well documented in the genus, which includes other mosasaurs, plesiosaurs, turtles, birds, bony fish, and sharks. Additional evidence from bite marks suggests the animal also preyed on giant squid and ammonites.

The enormous and varied appetite of Tylosaurus can be demonstrated in a 1987 find that identified fossils of a mosasaur measuring 2 meters (6.6 ft) or longer, the diving bird Hesperornis, a Bananogmius fish, and possibly a shark all within the stomach of a single T. proriger skeleton (SDSM 10439) recovered from the Pierre Shale of South Dakota. (Note: Identification of the mosasaur and shark vary. Scientists have identified the mosasaur as either a Platecarpus, Clidastes, or Latoplatecarpus. The shark is either interpreted as a Cretalamna, a sand shark, or of uncertain identity.) Other records of stomach contents include a sea turtle in a T. bernardi-like species, (Note: Usually identified as Hainosaurus sp.; Lingham-Soliar (1992) identifies the species as T. bernardi.) a 2.5 meters (8.2 ft) long Dolichorhynchops in another (8.8 metres (29 ft) long) T. proriger, partially digested bones and scales of a Cimolichthys in a third T. proriger, partially digested vertebrae of a Clidastes in a fourth T. proriger, remains of three Platecarpus individuals in a T. nepaeolicus, and Plioplatecarpus bones in a T. saskatchewanensis. Puncture marks on fossils of ammonites, the carapace of a Protostega, and the gladius of an Enchoteuthis have been attributed to Tylosaurus.

Skeletal reconstruction of Tylosaurus hunting a Xiphactinus at the Academy of Natural Sciences of Drexel University, Philadelphia

Pasch and May (2001) reported bite marks from a dinosaur skeleton known as the Talkeetna Mountains Hadrosaur, which was found in marine strata of the Turonian-age Matanuska Formation in Alaska. The features of these marks were found to closely match that of the teeth of T. proriger. Because the fossil's locality was of marine deposits, the study reasoned that the dinosaur must have drifted offshore as a bloat-and-float carcass that was subsequently scavenged by the mosasaur. It was unlikely that the marks were a result of predation, as that would have led to a puncture, preventing the buildup of the bloating gases that allowed the corpse to drift out to sea in the first place. Garvey (2020) criticized the lack of conclusive evidence to support this hypothesis and ruled out T. proriger as a possible culprit, given that the species did not appear until the Santonian and is exclusive to the Western Interior Seaway. However, close relatives did maintain a presence nearby, evidenced by fragmentary fossils of an indeterminate tylosaurine from Turonian deposits in the Russian Chukotsky District.

=== Social behavior ===
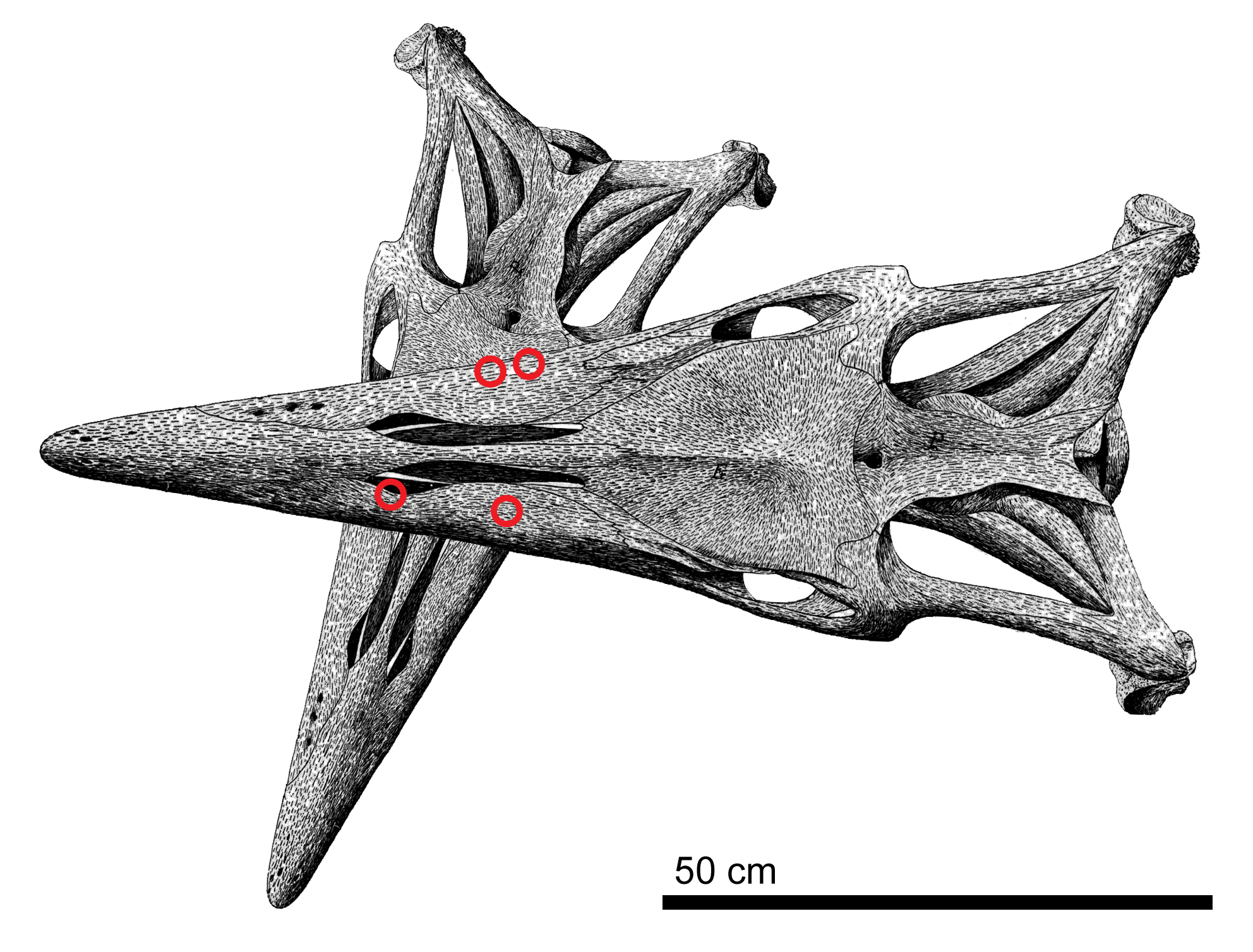
Reconstructed scenario of the attack (FHSM VP-2295); the red circles represent bite marks on the skull roof

The behavior of Tylosaurus towards each other may have been mostly aggressive, evidenced by fossils with injuries inflicted by another of their own kind. Such remains were frequently reported by fossil hunters during the late 19th and early 20th centuries, but few examples reside as specimens in scientific collections. Many of these fossils consist of healed bite marks and wounds that are concentrated around or near the head region, implying that there were the result of non-lethal interaction, but the motives of such contact remain speculative. In 1993, Bruce M. Rothschild and Larry D. Martin noted that some modern lizards affectionately bite their mate's head during courtship, which can sometimes result in injuries. Alternatively, they also observed that some males lizards also employ head-biting as territorial behavior against rivals in a show of dominance by grappling the head to turn over the other on its back. It is possible that Tylosaurus behaved in similar ways.

At least one fatal instance of intraspecific combat among Tylosaurus is documented in the holotype of the discussed species T. kansasensis (FHSM VP-2295), representing a 5 meters (16 ft) long animal, which possesses numerous injuries that indicate it was killed by a larger Tylosaurus. The skull roof and surrounding areas exhibit signs of trauma in the form of four massive gouges, and the dentary contains at least seven puncture wounds and gouges. These pathologies are characteristic of bite marks from a larger Tylosaurus that measured around 7 meters (23 ft) in length. The largest of the marks are about 4 centimeters (1.6 in) in length, matching the size of large mosasaur teeth, and they are positioned along two lines that converge close to 30°, matching the angle that each jaw converges towards in a mosasaur skull. In addition, FHSM VP-2295 suffered damage to its neck: the cervical vertebrae were found articulated at an unnatural angle of 40° relative to the long axis of the skull. The pattern of preservation makes it unlikely that the condition of the vertebrae was a result of disturbances by scavengers and instead indicates damage caused by a violently twisted neck during life. In a reconstructed scenario, the larger Tylosaurus would have first attacked at an angle slightly below the left side of the victim's head. This impact would cause the victim's skull to roll to the right side, allowing the aggressor to sink its teeth into the skull roof and right lower jaw, crushing the jaw and causing further breaks of nearby bones, such as the pterygoid, and the twisting of the jaw outwards, which would cause the quadrate to detach from its position and for the spinal cord to twist and sever at the skull's base, leading to a swift death.

=== Paleopathology ===
Examining 12 North American Tylosaurus skeletons and one T. bernardi skeleton, Rothschild and Martin (2005) identified evidence of avascular necrosis in every individual. For aquatic animals, this condition is often a result of decompression illness, which is caused when bone-damaging nitrogen bubbles build up in inhaled air that is decompressed either by frequent deep-diving trips or by intervals of repetitive diving and short breathing. The studied mosasaurs likely gained avascular necrosis through such behaviors, and given its invariable presence in Tylosaurus it is likely that deep or repetitive diving was a general behavioral trait of the genus. The study observed that between 3-15% of vertebrae in the spinal column of North American Tylosaurus and 16% of vertebrae in T. bernardi were affected by avascular necrosis. Carlsen (2017) posited that Tylosaurus gained avascular necrosis because it lacked the necessary adaptations for deep or repetitive diving, although noted that the genus had well-developed eardrums that could protect themselves from rapid changes in pressure.

Unnatural fusion of some vertebrae in the tail has been reported in some Tylosaurus skeletons. A variation of these fusions may concentrate near the end of the tail to form a single mass of multiple fused vertebrae called a "club tail." Rothschild and Everhart (2015) surveyed 23 North American Tylosaurus skeletons and one T. bernardi skeleton and found that five of the North American skeletons exhibited fused tail vertebrae. The condition was not found in T. bernardi, but this does not rule out its presence due to the low sample size. Vertebral fusion occurs when the bones remodel themselves after damage from trauma or disease. However, the cause of such events can vary between individuals and/or remain hypothetical. One juvenile specimen with the club tail condition was found with a shark tooth embedded in the fusion, which confirms that at least some cases were caused by infections inflicted by predator attacks. The majority of vertebral fusion cases in Tylosaurus were caused by bone infections, but some cases may have alternatively been caused by any type of joint disease such as arthritis. However, evidence of joint disease was rare in Tylosaurus when compared to mosasaurs such as Plioplatecarpus and Clidastes. Similar amassing of remodeled bone is also documented in bone fractures in other body parts. One T. kansasensis specimen possesses two fractured ribs that fully healed. Another T. proriger skull shows a fractured snout, probably caused by ramming into a hard object such as a rock. Presence of some healing indicates that the individual survived for some extended time before death, albeit under extreme pain.

== Paleoecology ==
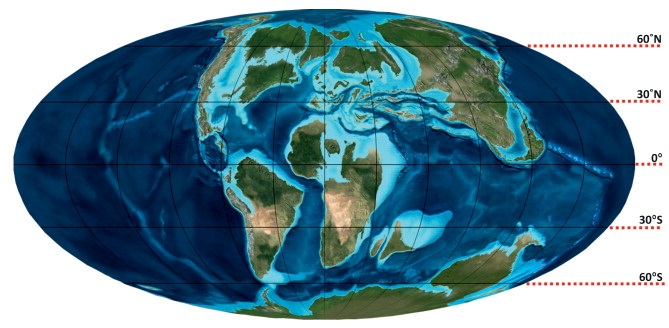
Tylosaurus was endemic to North Atlantic waters above 30°N.

Throughout its ~20 million-year history, Tylosaurus was endemic to the North Atlantic Circle Basin, a geographic region comprising the North Atlantic and neighboring waters including the Western Interior Seaway in North America and Mediterranean Tethys in Europe above 30°N. Much of the region was encompassed by a temperate ocean climate. There are a few exceptions of occurrences in warmer low-latitude zones in scientific literature. This includes T. iembeensis from the Coniacian of Angola, an isolated tooth from Maastrichtian deposits in the Democratic Republic of the Congo suggested as a possible 'Hainosaurus', and a specimen near the Cretaceous–Paleogene boundary at the Ouled Abdoun Basin, Morocco. The initial description of the Moroccan specimen has failed to conform to ICZN article 72.10 and recommendation 16C, for the museum that purportedly preserved the specimen is non-existent; the specimen itself is also undiagnostic and cannot be distinguished from other tylosaurines based on second hand observations by Zietlow et al. (2026).

=== Habitat preference ===
Stratigraphic evidence in the WIS is inconsistent on whether Tylosaurus preferred a specific habitat. Russell (1967) suggested that Tylosaurus in the Niobrara Formation frequented open waters far offshore, potentially up to 400 km (250 mi) from the nearest coastline in the WIS. This is supported by evidence in bone structure indicative of adaptation towards deeper waters. This includes osteoporosis, which naturally occurs in modern deep-diving or fast-swimming tetrapods due to bone growth in low-gravity environments both lifestyles create, and high fat deposition within bony microstructures, which together with osteoporosis would have allowed Tylosaurus to achieve neutral buoyancy in deep water. However, later work found that Tylosaurus is found throughout both shallow and open water deposits of the Niobrara Formation. On the other hand, Kiernan (2002) found that Tylosaurus comprised 57.7% of all mosasaurs found in Santonian to early Campanian deposits in Alabama that correspond to shallow continental shelves, and only 8.2% of mosasaurs in offshore deposits of similar ages. This implied that, at least in this region, Tylosaurus preferred nearshore waters.

Biogeochemical analyses of fossils instead support Tylosaurus as a spatial generalist that inhabited a wide range of marine habitats with little specific preference. Analysis of rare earth element (REE) ratios, which preserve information about the habitat an animal was buried in, from T. proriger and T. sp. bones from Alabama and South Dakota by Harrell and Pérez-Huerta (2014) found a widely distributed range of ratios indicating habitation across waters with depths from 50 m (160 ft) to below >150 m (490 ft). This range was wider than all other mosasaurs examined, including Clidastes, Mosasaurus, Platecarpus, and Plioplatecarpus. Carbon-13 isotope analysis (δ^{13}C) of tooth enamel by Robbins (2010) and Polcyn et al. (2025) also support a generalized habitat distribution. Unlike REEs, δ^{13}C is correlated with the habitat the animal fed or foraged in, with lower values associated with more offshore foraging habitats. Both studies together found a δ^{13}C range of -8.2‰ to -13.3‰ for Campanian T. proriger-like teeth from Texas (T. sp. aff. T. proriger) and -7.6‰ to 12.6‰ (all but one within -7.6‰ to -10.6‰) for T. ivoensis from Sweden. Isotope analyses of modern marine mammal teeth previously found that δ^{13}C ratios between roughly -8‰ to -12.5‰ correspond to nearshore marine habitats and 11.5‰ to 15‰ to offshore marine habitats. (Note: The study found an overlap from 11.5‰ to 12.5‰.) Based on this, Polcyn et al. (2025) inferred that the T. proriger affiliates foraged in both nearshore and offshore marine habitats, while T. ivoensis foraged primarily nearshore with occasional offshore excursions. Both studies also examined a yet-undescribed Turonian specimen belonging to a 3–4 m (9.8–13.1 ft) long individual and found a δ^{13}C ratio of -7.0‰. This corresponded to shallow waters analogous to modern kelp beds. Polcyn et al. (2025) suggested that early representatives of Tylosaurus were restricted to shallower habitats but expanded to more offshore zones over time as it evolved into larger sizes.

== See also ==
- Tylosaurinae
- Taniwhasaurus
