= Robnett =

Robnett is a surname. Notable people with the surname include:

- Ed Robnett (1920–1990), American football player
- Joseph Carl Robnett Licklider (1915–1990), American psychologist and computer scientist
- Marshall Robnett (1918–1967), American football player, brother of Ed
