= List of state highway spurs in Texas (1–99) =

- Texas State Highway Spur marker

Highway names
- Interstates: Interstate Highway X (IH-X, I-X)
- US Highways: U.S. Highway X (US X)
- State: State Highway X (SH X)
- Loops: Loop X
- Spurs: Spur X
- Farm or Ranch to Market Roads: Farm to Market Road X (FM X); Ranch-to-Market Road X (RM X)
- Park Roads: Park Road X (PR X)

System links
- Highways in Texas; Interstate; US; State; Former; Toll; Loops; Spurs; FM/RM; Park; Rec

State highway spurs in Texas are owned and maintained by the Texas Department of Transportation (TxDOT).

== Spur 1 ==
Spur 1 is a designation that has been used for two different routes, one in Uvalde County and the other in El Paso County.

=== Spur 1 (1939) ===
State Highway Spur 1
- Location: Uvalde County
- Existed: September 26, 1939–December 16, 1943

The first use of the Spur 1 designation was in Uvalde County, from US 90 1.5 miles (2.4 km) west of Uvalde south to the Uvalde National Fish Hatchery. On February 12, 1943, an 0.4 mile extension across the hatchery property to a connection with the Uvalde-Eagle Pass County Road was proposed. Spur 1 and the extension were cancelled on December 16, 1943, when the extension was blocked off. The roadway is now maintained by the county.

=== Spur 1 (1958) ===
State Highway Spur 1
- Location: El Paso County
- Existed: March 26, 1958–July 31, 1964

The second use of the Spur 1 designation was in El Paso County, from US 80 Alt. at or near Courchesne School to the approved route of I-10. Spur 1 was cancelled on July 31, 1964, and transferred to Loop 16 (now US 85).

== Spur 3 ==
State Highway Spur 3
- Location: Nueces County
- Existed: February 23, 1993–present

Spur 3 is located in Corpus Christi. It runs from SH 358 to the campus of Texas A&M University–Corpus Christi, a distance of 3.356 miles (5.401 km).

Spur 3 begins at a junction with the SH 358 freeway. It travels north, first along Ennis Joslin Boulevard and then along Alameda Street. The route turns to the east at Ocean Drive. Signage indicating that state maintenance ends is present east of the Sand Dollar Boulevard entrance to TAMU–CC.

Spur 3 was designated on February 23, 1993.

== Spur 5 ==
State Highway Spur 5
- Location: Harris County
- Length: 2.929 mi (4.714 km)
- Existed: October 29, 1998–present

Spur 5 is located in Houston. It begins at the intersection of Emancipation Avenue (formerly known as Dowling Street), Calhoun Street, and Jefferson Street in Houston's Third Ward. It has a brief concurrency with I-45 until that route's exit 44B, at which point it travels south as a freeway with frontage roads, passing the eastern side of the University of Houston campus. The mainlanes end prior to the intersection with University Drive, while the frontage roads continue to the route's southern terminus at US 90 Alt.

Spur 5 was designated on October 29, 1998, on the current route. Plans call for the highway to eventually become a new freeway route for SH 35 through the southern Houston area. Known as the Alvin Freeway, planning on the project moved forward in 2023 after 15 years of delays. The freeway will be constructed in two phases with an estimated cost of $366 million.

=== Spur 5 (1950) ===
State Highway Spur 5
- Location: Hays County
- Existed: September 28, 1950–October 27, 1952

The first use of the Spur 5 designation was in Hays County, from US 81 west 0.2 miles (0.32 km) to Burleson Street in Kyle, as a replacement of a section of Loop 5. Spur 5 was cancelled on October 27, 1952, and transferred to FM 150 (now RM 150).

=== Spur 5 (1958) ===
State Highway Spur 5
- Location: Chambers County
- Existed: June 30, 1958–August 4, 1988

The next use of the Spur 5 designation was in Chambers County, from the intersection of FM 1406 and SH 124 in Winnie north to I-10. On October 31, 1962, the section from FM 1406 to SH 73 was transferred to SH 124. The remainder of Spur 5 was cancelled on August 4, 1988, by district request and transferred to FM 1663.

== Spur 6 ==
State Highway Spur 6
- Location: El Paso County
- Existed: October 29, 1998–present

Spur 6 is located in Anthony and is 1.506 miles (2.424 km) in length.

The western terminus of Spur 6 is at SH 20 (Main Street). The route travels east and then north along Wildcat Drive before ending at FM 1905 (Antonio Street), just west of that route's interchange with I-10. The roadway continues north toward the New Mexico state line as Sandia Drive.

Spur 6 was designated on October 29, 1998. The route replaced a majority of what was previously designated FM 3500, which was canceled in its entirety in the same Minute Order.

== Spur 9 ==
State Highway Spur 9
- Location: Lamb County
- Existed: September 26, 1939–June 21, 1955

Spur 9 was located in Olton.

The route was designated on September 26, 1939, from US 70 to Olton as a renumbering of SH 28 Spur. Spur 9 was cancelled on June 21, 1955, and became a portion of FM 304; that route has since become a part of FM 168.

== Spur 10 ==
State Highway Spur 10
- Location: Fort Bend County
- Length: 9.100 mi (14.645 km)
- Existed: September 29, 1994–present

Spur 10 is located in Fort Bend County and runs from Pleak to Rosenberg. Both of its termini are at SH 36.

Spur 10 was designated on September 29, 1994, from SH 36, 5.2 miles (8.4 km) northwest of Rosenberg, southeast 4.8 miles (7.7 km) to US 59/Spur 529. On August 30, 2012, the road was extended 4.8 miles (7.7 km) along local routes to reconnect with SH 36 in Pleak.

== Spur 16 ==
State Highway Spur 16
- Location: El Paso County
- Length: 0.875 mi (1,408 m)
- Existed: July 30, 2012–present

Spur 16 is located in El Paso. It runs in a northeasterly direction from SH 20 to Loop 375, just west of that route's interchange with I-10.

Spur 16 was designated on July 30, 2012, as a redesignation of Spur 276.

=== Spur 16 (2005) ===
State Highway Spur 16
- Location: Maverick County
- Existed: March 31, 2005–July 26, 2012

The original Spur 16 was designated on March 31, 2005, in Eagle Pass. It ran from US 277 east 0.9 miles (1.4 km) to US 57. On July 26, 2012, this route was redesignated as Spur 216. The Spur 16 designation was reassigned to its current route in El Paso, replacing Spur 276.

== Spur 17 ==
State Highway Spur 17
- Location: Dallam County
- Length: 1.970 mi (3.170 km)
- Existed: March 27, 2008–present

Spur 17 is located in Dalhart.

Spur 17 begins at the intersection of US 87 and FM 1727 on the northern edge of Dalhart. Locally named Ponderosa Lane, Spur 17 continues as a rural, two-lane road along the northern boundary of Dalhart. It leaves the Dalhart city limits before reaching its eastern terminus at US 385.

Spur 17 was designated on March 27, 2008, on the current route.

== Spur 18 ==
Spur 18 is a designation that has been used for two different routes, one in Fannin County and the other in Coryell County.

=== Spur 18 (1951) ===
State Highway Spur 18
- Location: Coryell County
- Existed: September 26, 1939–July 6, 1951

The first Spur 18 was designated on September 16, 1939, from US 84 to Oglesby. The route was cancelled on July 6, 1951, and its mileage was transferred to FM 1742 (later FM 107, now FM 1996).

=== Spur 18 (1993) ===
State Highway Spur 18
- Location: Fannin County
- Existed: 1993–2000

The second Spur 18 was a temporary designation issued in 1993, while the US 82 freeway was being constructed in Bonham. It ran from SH 121 to SH 78. The route was decommissioned upon completion of the construction.

== Spur 19 ==
State Highway Spur 19
- Location: Montague County
- Existed: September 26, 1939–present

Spur 19 is located in Montague County. It runs approximately 0.24 miles (0.39 km) from Loop 19 (Sixth Street) via Main Street to the western right-of-way of the Union Pacific Railroad (formerly the Chicago, Rock Island and Gulf Railway) at Ninth Street.

Spur 19 was designated on September 26, 1939. The route was previously designated SH 2 Tap.

== Spur 21 ==
State Highway Spur 21
- Location: Dickens County
- Existed: September 26, 1939–May 19, 1942

Spur 21 is the former designation of the southern section of Loop 21 in Spur.

The Spur 21 designation was assigned on September 26, 1939, along Sixth Street, from SH 70 east of Spur to an intersection with Burlington Avenue. On May 19, 1942, the route was extended along Burlington Avenue to reconnect with SH 70 north of Spur, and the designation was changed to Loop 21.

== Spur 22 ==
State Highway Spur 22
- Location: Nueces County
- Length: 0.270 mi (435 m)
- Existed: August 30, 2001–present

Spur 22 is located in Robstown. It connects Bus. US 77 and SH 44.

Spur 22 was designated on August 30, 2001, on the current route to replace US 77 when that highway was rerouted.

=== Spur 22 (1939) ===
State Highway Spur 22
- Location: Stonewall County
- Existed: September 26, 1939–February 25, 1954

The original Spur 22 was designated on September 26, 1939, from US 380 south along Central Avenue to an intersection with Mesquite Street in Peacock. Spur 22 was cancelled on February 25, 1954, and transferred to FM 2211.

== Spur 23 ==
State Highway Spur 23
- Location: Red River County
- Existed: September 26, 1939–May 19, 1942

Spur 23 was located in Annona.

Spur 23 was designated on September 25, 1939, from US 82 to Annona as a renumbering of SH 5 Spur. Spur 23 was cancelled on May 19, 1942, and became part of the newly designated FM 44.

== Spur 24 ==
State Highway Spur 24
- Location: Dallam County
- Length: 1.950 mi (3.138 km)
- Existed: March 27, 2008–present

Spur 24 is located near Dalhart. It runs from US 385 north of Dalhart east to Noble Road near US 54.

Spur 24 was designated on March 27, 2008, on the current route.

=== Spur 24 (1939) ===
State Highway Spur 24
- Location: Newton County
- Existed: September 26, 1939–July 15, 1949

The original Spur 24 was designated on September 26, 1939, from SH 87 north of Burkeville to Wiergate as a renumbering of SH 87 Spur. The designation was cancelled on October 24, 1944, when the sawmill it served shut down, but it was reinstated on July 31, 1946. On July 15, 1949, Spur 24 was once again cancelled and transferred to FM 1415.

== Spur 25 ==
State Highway Spur 25
- Location: Val Verde County
- Existed: September 26, 1939–October 24, 1939

Spur 25 was designated on September 25, 1939, from US 90 near Langtry, passing the historic The Jersey Lilly house, operated by Judge Roy Bean, to Langtry as a renumbering of SH 3 Spur. One month later, the route was extended to US 90 on the other side of Langtry and was redesignated Loop 25.

== Spur 26 ==
State Highway Spur 26
- Location: Williamson County
- Existed: May 25, 2006–present

Spur 26 is located in Williamson County. It runs from I-35 to RM 2243 / FM 1460 in Georgetown.

Spur 26 was designated on May 25, 2006, on the current route as a replacement of a section of Business I-35-M; the other section that remained on the state highway system was designated Spur 158.

=== Spur 26 (1939) ===
State Highway Spur 26
- Location: Crosby County
- Existed: September 26, 1939–May 27, 1948

The original Spur 26 was designated on September 26, 1939, from US 62 (formerly SH 24, now US 62/US 82/SH 114) to Lorenzo as a replacement of SH 24 Spur. On October 14, 1946, the road was extended north 2 miles (3.2 km) to the Lorenzo Cemetery; the entire route was added to FM 378 but still designated as Spur 26. Spur 26 was officially cancelled and its mileage was transferred to FM 378 on May 27, 1948.

== Spur 27 ==
State Highway Spur 27
- Location: Lavaca County
- Existed: September 26, 1939–November 20, 1946

Spur 27 was designated on September 26, 1939, from US 77 (now US 77 Alt.) north of Yoakum to Sweet Home as a replacement of SH 72 Spur. Spur 27 was cancelled on November 20, 1946, and transferred to FM 531.

== Spur 28 ==
State Highway Spur 28
- Location: Brazoria County
- Existed: September 26, 1939–present

Spur 28 is located in Danbury in Brazoria County.

Spur 28 begins at an intersection with SH 35 northeast of Angleton, heading southeast on the two-lane, undivided Main Street. The road passes fields and some homes before entering Danbury. Spur 28 passes residences and businesses, ending at an intersection with Sixth Street. Past this intersection, Main Street continues as an unnumbered road into the center of the city, crossing over the Union Pacific Railroad.

Spur 28 was designated on September 26, 1939, on the current route as a replacement of SH 35 Spur.

== Spur 29 ==
State Highway Spur 29
- Location: Hidalgo County
- Existed: December 17, 2009–present

Spur 29 is located in Hidalgo County. It runs along I Road, from US 281 at the southeastern city limits of Pharr to the proposed Border Safety Inspection Facility north of the Pharr–Reynosa International Bridge.

Spur 29 was designated on December 17, 2009, on the current route.

=== Spur 29 (1939) ===
State Highway Spur 29
- Location: Cherokee County
- Existed: September 26, 1939–June 13, 1958

Spur 29 was originally designated on September 26, 1939, on a route from US 69 to Forest as a replacement of SH 40 Spur. This roadway was formerly a section of SH 266, and was originally proposed to remain as SH 266 after it was redesignated. Spur 29 was cancelled on June 13, 1958, and transferred to FM 1911, and signage was updated in 1959 to reflect the change in designation.

== Spur 30 ==
State Highway Spur 30
- Location: Wheeler County
- Length: 0.479 mi (771 m)
- Existed: October 25, 1975–present

Spur 30 is located in Wheeler County. It runs from I-40 near Benonine southeast to the Oklahoma state line, where the roadway continues to Texola, Oklahoma.

Spur 30 was designated on October 25, 1975, on the current route as a replacement of a section of US 66.

=== Spur 30 (1939) ===
State Highway Spur 30
- Location: Navarro County
- Existed: September 26, 1939–January 4, 1960

The original Spur 30 was designated on September 26, 1939, from SH 22 to Frost as a replacement of SH 22 Spur. On January 4, 1960, Spur 30 was cancelled and transferred to FM 667.

== Spur 31 ==
State Highway Spur 31
- Location: Hidalgo County
- Length: 0.230 mi (370 m)
- Existed: July 25, 1960–present

Spur 31 is located in Mercedes. It runs from Bus. US 83 to exit 161 of the I-2/US 83 expressway. The locally maintained Mile 2 W Road continues beyond both termini.

Spur 31 was designated on July 25, 1960, from US 83 (later Loop 374, now Bus. US 83) north to the then-proposed US 83 expressway.

=== Spur 31 (1939) ===
State Highway Spur 31
- Location: Navarro County
- Existed: September 26, 1939–September 26, 1945

The original Spur 31 was designated on September 26, 1939, from SH 22 to Blooming Grove as a replacement of SH 22 Spur. On September 26, 1945, Spur 31 was cancelled and became a portion of FM 634 (now FM 55).

== Spur 32 ==
State Highway Spur 32
- Location: Navarro County
- Length: 0.332 mi (534 m)
- Existed: September 26, 1939–October 10, 1951

Spur 32 was designated on September 26, 1939, from SH 22 to Barry as a replacement of SH 22 Spur. On October 10, 1951, Spur 32 was cancelled and became a portion of FM 1126.

== Spur 33 ==
State Highway Spur 33
- Location: Collin County
- Existed: September 26, 1939–February 28, 2019

Spur 33 was designated on September 26, 1939, from SH 289 to Frisco as a replacement of SH 24 Spur. The initial description of the route included a connection back to SH 289. On February 28, 2019, Spur 33 was removed from the highway system and returned to the city of Frisco. The road is now named Gary Burns Drive.

.

== Spur 35 ==
State Highway Spur 35
- Location: Sabine County
- Length: 2.203 mi (3.545 km)
- Existed: September 26, 1939–present

Spur 35 is located in Sabine County. It runs from SH 21 to McMahan Chapel.

Spur 35 was designated on September 26, 1939, on the current route as a replacement of SH 21 Spur.

== Spur 37 ==
State Highway Spur 37
- Location: El Paso County
- Existed: June 30, 2005–present

Spur 37 is a 1.1-mile-long (1.8 km) route in Vinton. It begins at SH 20 (Doniphan Road) and travels east along Vinton Road before ending at exit 2 on I-10.

Spur 37 was designated on June 30, 2005, along its current route. The number had previously been used for Loop 37 in Avery from 1939 to 1990.

== Spur 38 ==
State Highway Spur 38
- Location: Red River County
- Existed: August 25, 1952–present

Spur 38 is located in Bogata. It runs from Bus. US 271 (former Loop 38) to SH 37.

Spur 38 was designated on August 25, 1952, on the current route.

== Spur 39 ==
State Highway Spur 39
- Location: Delta County
- Existed: September 26, 1939–September 28, 1949

Spur 39 was located in Klondike.

Spur 39 was designated on September 26, 1939, from SH 24 (the original description stated SH 27; this was corrected in 1943) to Klondike as a renumbering of SH 24 Spur. On September 28, 1949, Spur 39 was cancelled and became a portion of FM 1528.

== Spur 40 ==
=== Spur 40 (1939) ===
State Highway Spur 40
- Location: Palo Pinto County
- Existed: September 26, 1939–March 26, 1942

The first use of the Spur 40 designation was in Palo Pinto County, from US 80 to Santo. Spur 40 was cancelled on March 26, 1942, in exchange for being redesignated as FM 4.

=== Spur 40 (1959) ===
State Highway Spur 40
- Location: Leon County
- Existed: March 26, 1959–July 31, 1973

The second use of the Spur 40 designation was in Leon County, from FM 3 west to Normangee Park. On July 31, 1973, Spur 40 was cancelled and removed from the highway system when Normangee Park became privately operated.

== Spur 41 ==
=== Spur 41 (1939) ===
State Highway Spur 41
- Location: Wheeler County
- Existed: September 26, 1939–May 19, 1942

The first use of the Spur 41 designation was in Wheeler County, from SH 152 to Old Mobeetie as a replacement of SH 152 Spur. On May 19, 1942, Spur 41 was cancelled and became part of FM 48.

=== Spur 41 (1965) ===
State Highway Spur 41
- Location: Fort Bend County
- Existed: January 27, 1965–October 31, 2002

The next use of the Spur 41 designation was in Fort Bend County, from then-US 59 (now US 90 Alt.) to then-proposed US 59 (now co-signed as I-69) near Sugar Land along present-day Dairy Ashford Road. On October 31, 2002, Spur 41 was cancelled by district request and returned to the city of Sugar Land.

== Spur 45 ==
State Highway Spur 45
- Location: Garza County
- Length: 0.537 mi (864 m)
- Existed: September 25, 1939–present

Spur 45 is located in Southland. It runs from US 84 (former SH 7) to State Street in Southland.

Spur 45 was designated on September 25, 1939, on the current route as a replacement of SH 7 Spur.

== Spur 48 ==
State Highway Spur 48
- Location: Travis County
- Existed: September 25, 1939–August 24, 1954

Spur 48 was designated on September 25, 1939, from US 290 near the Montopolis Bridge to 5th Street in Austin. On December 16, 1948, a section from north of the Montopolis Bridge north to E 1st Street (former US 290) was added. Spur 48 was cancelled on August 24, 1954, and returned to the city of Austin due to rerouting of US 183.

== Spur 49 ==
State Highway Spur 49
- Location: Navarro County
- Existed: September 25, 1939–August 4, 1966

Spur 49 was designated on September 25, 1939, from SH 22 near Corsicana to the State Orphans' Home. On August 4, 1966, Spur 49 was cancelled and removed from the highway system when TxDOT no longer needed it.

== Spur 50 ==
State Highway Spur 50
- Location: Johnson County
- Existed: September 25, 1939–August 25, 2011

Spur 50 was designated on September 25, 1939, from Loop 50 in Burleson to US 81. On May 31, 1957, it was extended over part of Loop 50 and old SH 174 to new SH 174, and Loop 50 was cancelled. On February 5, 1960, the road was rerouted along Renfro Street from I-35W to then-new SH 174; the old route along Ellison Street and Johnson Street was removed altogether. Spur 50 was cancelled on August 25, 2011, and returned to the city of Burleson, as requested by the Burleson City Council.

== Spur 51 ==
State Highway Spur 51
- Location: Denton County
- Length: 0.55 mi (890 m)
- Existed: October 28, 1997–present

Spur 51 is located in Denton. It runs from SH 114 to Elizabethtown Road via Raceway Drive. The route is unsigned.

Spur 51 was designated on October 28, 1997, on the current route. On January 25, 2001, Spur 51 was planned to be cancelled, but this was deferred.

== Spur 52 ==
State Highway Spur 52
- Location: Colorado County
- Length: 0.895 mi (1,440 m)
- Existed: September 25, 1939–present

Spur 52 is located in Columbus. It runs from US 90 to Bus. SH 71.

Spur 52 was designated on September 25, 1939, from SH 71 (later Loop 329, now Bus. SH 71) north along Milam Street to US 90 in Columbus as a replacement of SH 71 Spur.

== Spur 53 ==
Spur 53 is a designation that has been used for two different routes, one in McLennan County and the other in Bexar County.

=== Spur 53 (1939) ===
State Highway Spur 53
- Location: McLennan County
- Existed: September 25, 1939–December 1, 1953

The first route numbered Spur 53 was designated in McLennan County on September 25, 1939, from US 81 to Harrison Street in West. Spur 53 was cancelled on December 1, 1953, and transferred to FM 2114.

=== Spur 53 (1980) ===
State Highway Spur 53
- Location: Bexar County
- Existed: May 21, 1980–March 28, 2019

The second route numbered Spur 53 was designated in Bexar County on May 21, 1980. Spur 53 provided access from I-10 to the southern side of the University of Texas at San Antonio. State maintenance began along UTSA Boulevard at a point approximately 200 ft (61 m) west of the main southern entrance of UTSA at Edward Ximenes Avenue. The route travelled east, passing the headquarters of Valero Energy Corporation, before the Spur 53 designation ended at I-10 exit 557, with UTSA Boulevard continuing east under local jurisdiction.

In early 2015, TxDOT began to increase capacity by doubling the number of lanes in each direction, adding a median, sidewalks, and bicycle lanes. On December 18, 2014, Spur 53 was scheduled for removal from the state highway system as part of TxDOT's San Antonio turnback program, which gave 21.8 miles (35.1 km) of roads to the city. The cancellation did not occur until March 28, 2019.

== Spur 54 ==
State Highway Spur 54
- Location: Cameron County
- Existed: November 30, 1961–present

Spur 54 is located in Harlingen. It runs from I-2/US 83 to I-69E/US 77.

Spur 54 was designated on November 30, 1961, from US 83 northeast to Spur 329 (now US 77) at Jefferson Avenue.

=== Spur 54 (1939) ===
State Highway Spur 54
- Location: Limestone County
- Existed: September 25, 1939–August 19, 1957

The original Spur 54 was designated on September 25, 1939, from SH 14 to Thornton. On August 19, 1957, Spur 54 was cancelled and became a portion of FM 1246.

== Spur 55 ==
=== Spur 55 (1939) ===
State Highway Spur 55
- Location: Hill County
- Existed: September 25, 1939–June 23, 1959

The first use of the Spur 55 designation was in Hill County, from SH 22 to Brandon. On June 23, 1959, Spur 55 was cancelled and transferred to FM 1243.

=== Spur 55 (1968) ===
State Highway Spur 55
- Location: Harris and Chambers counties
- Existed: December 12, 1968–March 28, 2002

The next use of the Spur 55 designation was in Harris and Chambers counties, from SH 146 in Baytown east across Cedar Bayou to FM 1405. Spur 55 was cancelled on March 28, 2002, by district request and redesignated as SH 99.

== Spur 56 ==
State Highway Spur 56
- Location: Willacy County
- Length: 0.254 mi (409 m)
- Existed: July 30, 1965–present

Spur 56 is located in Raymondville. It runs from I-69E/US 77 to Bus. US 77.

Spur 56 was designated on July 30, 1965, from then-US 77 (later Loop 448, now US 77 Business) east to then-proposed US 77 (now I-69E/US 77).

=== Spur 56 (1939) ===
State Highway Spur 56
- Location: Hill County
- Existed: September 25, 1939–January 26, 1948

The original Spur 56 was designated on September 26, 1939, from SH 22 to Mertens. Spur 56 was cancelled on January 26, 1948, and became a portion of FM 308 (later Spur 314, now a local road).

== Spur 57 ==
State Highway Spur 57
- Location: Ward County
- Length: 11.170 mi (17.976 km)
- Existed: August 28, 1991–present

Spur 57 is located in Pyote. It runs from I-20 to Business I-20-D near Wickett.

Spur 57 was designated on August 28, 1991, on the current route as a replacement of a section of US 80 when it was rerouted on the current I-20.

=== Spur 57 (1939) ===
State Highway Spur 57
- Location: Montgomery County
- Existed: September 25, 1939–April 15, 1986

The original Spur 57 was designated on September 25, 1939, from US 75 (now SH 75) to southern Conroe. On December 30, 1960, the route was modified to run as a loop off US 75 and was changed to Loop 57. The Spur 57 designation was restored on May 1, 1980, when a 0.3 mile section of Loop 57 was transferred to SH 105. On April 15, 1986, Spur 57 was cancelled and returned to the city of Conroe.

== Spur 58 ==
State Highway Spur 58
- Location: Fort Bend County
- Existed: September 25, 1939–October 31, 2002

Spur 58 was designated on September 25, 1939, from SH 6 to US 90 Alt. west of Sugar Land along present-day Brooks Street. On October 31, 2002, Spur 58 was cancelled and returned to the city of Sugar Land.

== Spur 59 ==
State Highway Spur 59
- Location: Walker County
- Length: 0.207 mi (333 m)
- Existed: August 20, 1980–present

Spur 59 is located in Huntsville. It runs from SH 75 (old US 75) to I-45.

Spur 59 was designated on August 20, 1980, on the current route.

=== Spur 59 (1939) ===
State Highway Spur 59
- Location: Brazoria County
- Existed: September 25, 1939–June 15, 1955

The original Spur 59 was designated on September 25, 1939, from SH 36 to SH 35 in West Columbia. On June 15, 1955, Spur 59 was cancelled and became a portion of FM 1301 (now SH 35).

== Spur 63 ==
State Highway Spur 63
- Location: Gregg County
- Length: 3.917 mi (6.304 km)
- Existed: August 27, 1958–present

Spur 63 is located in Gregg County. It runs from US 80/SH 31 to Spur 502.

Spur 63 was designated on August 27, 1958, from SH 26 (now US 259) near the west side of Longview north across a Texas and Pacific Railroad rail line to US 80 near Tutt Street. On May 5, 1966, the road was extended north 3.3 miles (5.3 km) to Loop 281. On January 31, 1972, the section from US 80 south 0.4 miles (0.64 km) was transferred to US 259. On October 26, 1981, a 1-mile (1.6 km) section from Loop 281 north to Spur 502 (old US 259) was added.

=== Spur 63 (1939) ===
State Highway Spur 63
- Location: Henderson County
- Existed: September 25, 1939–August 1, 1944

The original Spur 63 was designated on September 25, 1939, from SH 31 to the St. Louis Southwestern Railway of Texas rail line in Malakoff. On August 1, 1944, Spur 63 was cancelled and became a portion of FM 90 (now FM 3441).

== Spur 64 ==
State Highway Spur 64
- Location: Henderson County
- Existed: September 25, 1939–November 22, 1948

Spur 64 was designated on September 25, 1939, from SH 31 to the St. Louis Southwestern Railway of Texas rail line in Trinidad. On November 22, 1948, Spur 64 was cancelled and became an extension of FM 764.

== Spur 65 ==
State Highway Spur 65
- Location: Ward County
- Length: 0.558 mi (898 m)
- Existed: December 18, 1958–present

Spur 65 is located in Ward County. Its southern terminus is at I-20 exit 70 between Pyote and Wickett. Its northern terminus at Spur 57, the former route of US 80 between Pyote and Monahans.

The current Spur 65 was designated on December 18, 1958, connecting what was then US 80 to the proposed location of I-20. The bridge at the interchange with I-20 was completed in 1964.

=== Spur 65 (1939) ===
State Highway Spur 65
- Location: Henderson County
- Existed: September 25, 1939–August 21, 1950

A previous route numbered Spur 65 was designated in Henderson County on September 25, 1939, from US 175 to Baxter as a replacement of SH 40 Spur. This route was cancelled on August 21, 1950, and became a portion of FM 804.

== Spur 66 ==
=== Spur 66 (1939) ===
State Highway Spur 66
- Location: Gregg County
- Existed: September 25, 1939–August 1, 1956

The first use of the Spur 66 designation was in Gregg County, from SH 26 to the northeast side of Kilgore as a replacement of SH 26 Loop. On August 1, 1956, the road was extended through Kilgore to SH 26 on the other side of town and the route was changed to Loop 66.

=== Spur 66 (2003) ===
State Highway Spur 66
- Location: Bexar County
- Existed: February 27, 2003–December 18, 2014

The next use of the Spur 66 designation was in Bexar County, from SH 16 southeast 1.5 miles (2.4 km) to Applewhite Road (Toyota headquarters). On December 18, 2014, Spur 66 was cancelled and returned to the city of San Antonio as part of TxDOT's San Antonio turnback program, which gave 21.8 miles of roads to the city.

== Spur 67 ==
State Highway Spur 67
- Location: Madison County
- Length: 0.342 mi (550 m)
- Existed: August 27, 1959–present

Spur 67 is located in Madison County. It runs from SH 75 (former US 75), 3 miles (4.8 km) north of the Walker County line, northeast to I-45 at South Connor Road.

Spur 67 was designated on August 27, 1959, on the current route.

=== Spur 67 (1939) ===
State Highway Spur 67
- Location: Dawson and Martin counties
- Existed: September 25, 1939–October 24, 1941

The original Spur 67 was designated on September 25, 1939, from US 87 to Ackerly as a replacement of SH 9 Spur. On October 24, 1941, the road was extended through Ackerly to US 87 east of town and the route was changed to Loop 67 (now FM 2002 and FM 2212).

== Spur 68 ==
State Highway Spur 68
- Location: Jasper County
- Existed: January 18, 1955–June 21, 1990

Spur 68 was designated on January 18, 1955, as a replacement of Loop 68 when it was modified to run from US 96 to SH 62. On June 21, 1990, Spur 68 was cancelled and transferred to Bus. US 96.

== Spur 69 ==
State Highway Spur 69
- Location: Travis County
- Length: 1.260 mi (2.028 km)
- Existed: January 21, 1969–present

Spur 69 is located in Travis County. It runs from RM 2222/Lamar Boulevard to I-35/US 290. The road is known locally as Koenig Lane.

Spur 69 was designated on January 21, 1969, from I-35 west along Airport Boulevard to Koenig Lane near a Southern Pacific rail line. On January 31, 1972, the road was extended west 0.7 miles (1.1 km) to Lamar Boulevard (then Loop 275) and was signed as RM 2222 rather than Spur 69. On October 27, 1989, Spur 69 was cancelled and transferred to SH 169, but was transferred back to Spur 69 nine months later.

=== Spur 69 (1939) ===
State Highway Spur 69
- Location: Newton County
- Existed: September 25, 1939–October 27, 1945

The original Spur 69 was designated on September 25, 1939, from SH 87 at Deweyville to the Sabine River as a replacement of SH 87 Spur. The route was initially proposed as SH 298. On October 27, 1945, Spur 69 was cancelled and became a portion of SH 235 (now SH 12).

== Spur 71 ==
State Highway Spur 71
- Location: Goliad County
- Existed: September 25, 1939–May 5, 1966

Spur 71 was designated on September 25, 1939, from SH 29 (now US 183) to the grave site of James Fannin. On May 5, 1966, a section was added to serve the La Bahia Mission area and the route was changed to Loop 71.

== Spur 72 ==
State Highway Spur 72
- Location: Angelina County
- Length: 0.590 mi (950 m)
- Existed: March 31, 1987–present

Spur 72 is located in Lufkin. It runs from Loop 287 to FM 1271.

Spur 72 was designated on March 31, 1987, on the current route as a replacement of a section of FM 1271.

=== Spur 72 (1939) ===
State Highway Spur 72
- Location: San Patricio County
- Existed: September 25, 1939–April 19, 1949

The first use of the Spur 72 designation was in San Patricio County, from US 181 near northwestern Sinton to SH 96 north of Chillipin Creek. Spur 72 was cancelled on April 19, 1949, and replaced by a rerouted US 181.

=== Spur 72 (1960) ===
State Highway Spur 72
- Location: Nueces County
- Existed: September 26, 1960–November 18, 1983

The next use of the Spur 72 designation was in Nueces County, from I-37 west of Corpus Christi south to SH 9 (now Spur 407). On November 18, 1983, Spur 72 was cancelled and returned to the city of Corpus Christi.

== Spur 73 ==
State Highway Spur 73
- Location: Ellis County
- Length: 1.300 mi (2.092 km)
- Existed: June 30, 2006–present

Spur 73 is located in Midlothian. It runs from US 287 Business to US 67.

Spur 73 was designated on June 30, 2006, on the current route.

=== Spur 73 (1939) ===
State Highway Spur 73
- Location: Collin County
- Existed: September 25, 1939–March 15, 1943

The original Spur 73 was designated on September 25, 1939, from SH 24 to Princeton as a replacement of SH 145, although it was proposed to stay SH 145. Spur 73 was cancelled on March 15, 1943, and replaced by FM 75.

== Spur 74 ==
State Highway Spur 74
- Location: Bowie County
- Existed: November 30, 1961–present

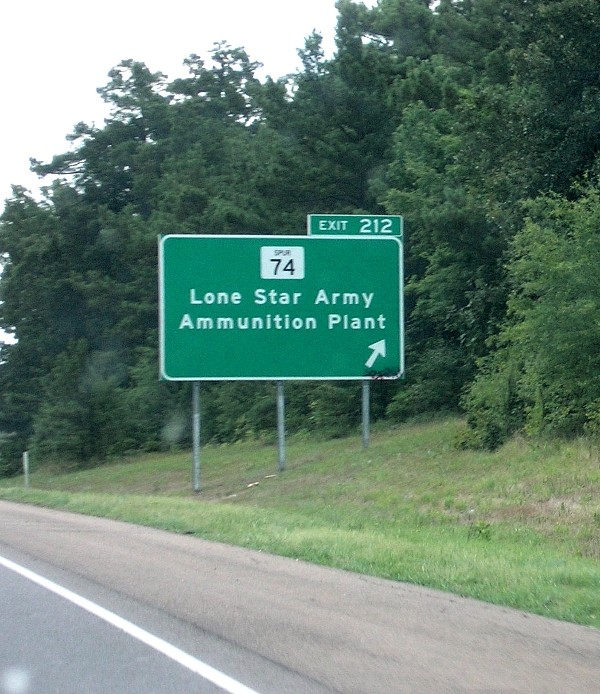
Approaching Spur 74 along eastbound I-30

Spur 74 is located in Bowie County. It runs from exit 212 on I-30 through Leary to US 82 near Victory City, at the entrance to the now-deactivated Lone Star Army Ammunition Plant. Spur 74 was designated on November 30, 1961, on the current route.

=== Spur 74 (1939) ===
State Highway Spur 74
- Location: Cochran County
- Existed: September 25, 1939–October 18, 1948

The original Spur 74 was designated on September 25, 1939, from the historic routing of SH 24 to Whiteface, as a replacement for SH 24 Spur. On October 18, 1948, Spur 74 was cancelled and its mileage was transferred to FM 769 (now SH 125).

== Spur 77 ==
State Highway Spur 77
- Location: Jeff Davis County
- Length: 0.478 mi (769 m)
- Existed: October 25, 1990–present

Spur 77 is located in Jeff Davis County. It connects Spur 78 to the facilities of the McDonald Observatory on Mount Fowlkes in the Davis Mountains.

Spur 77 was designated on October 25, 1990, along the current route.

== Spur 78 ==
State Highway Spur 78
- Location: Jeff Davis County
- Length: 1.547 mi (2.490 km)
- Existed: September 25, 1939–present

Spur 78 is located in Jeff Davis County. It connects SH 118 to the facilities of the McDonald Observatory on Mount Locke in the Davis Mountains. It intersects Spur 77.

The route passes by the observatory's Frank N. Bash Visitors Center near its terminus at SH 118. At its terminus at the summit of Mount Locke, Spur 78 has the highest elevation at any point on the state highway system, at 6,791 feet (2,070 m). The Otto Struve Telescope and Harlan J. Smith Telescope are located nearby, as is a scenic overlook of the valley below and the surrounding Davis Mountains.

Spur 78 was designated on September 25, 1939, from SH 166 (now SH 118) to the McDonald Observatory as a replacement of SH 166 Spur. The route was initially proposed as SH 280.

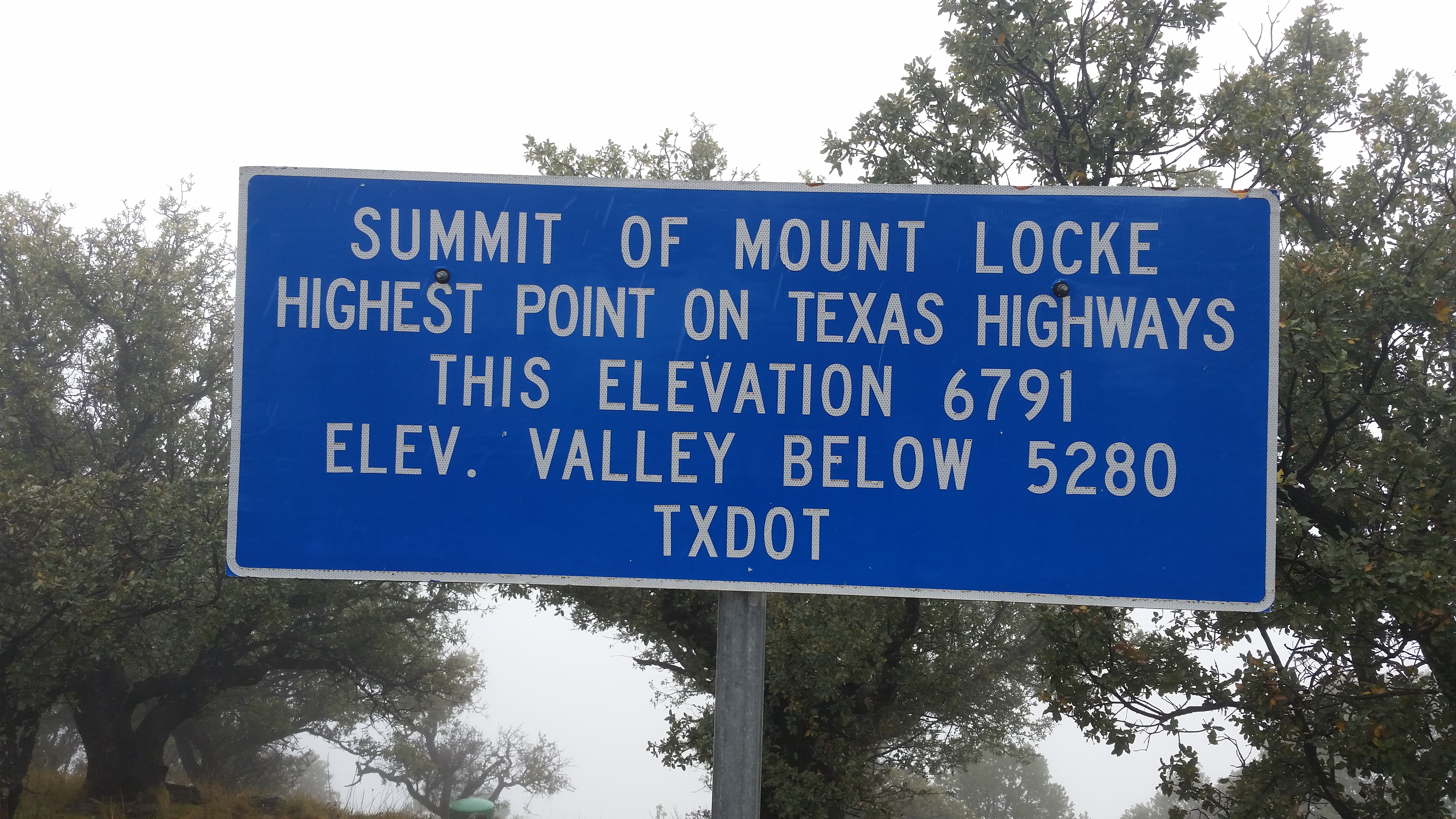
Elevation sign at terminus of Spur 78 atop Mt. Locke at McDonald Observatory

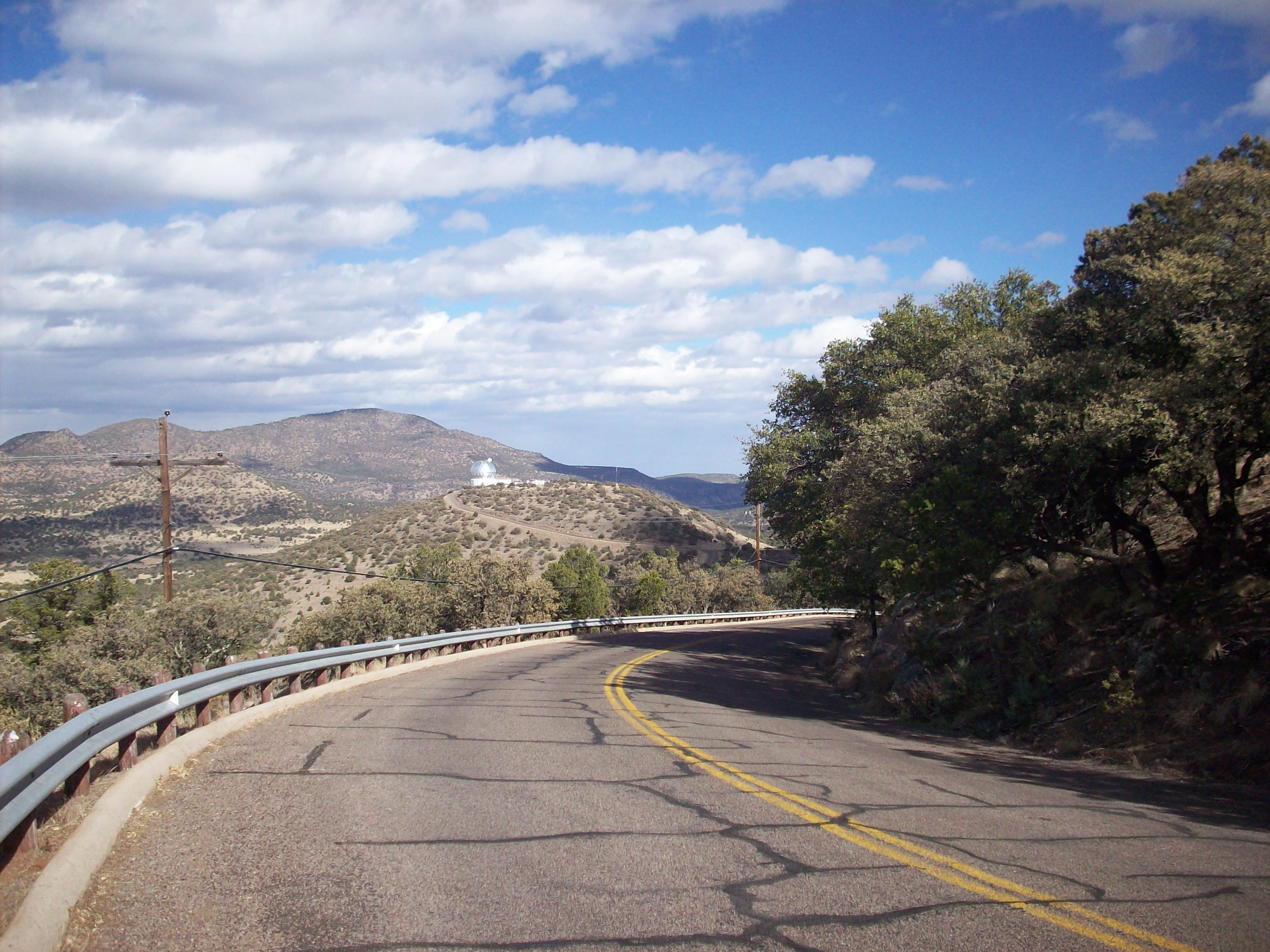
Spur 78 descending Mt. Locke at McDonald Observatory. Spur 77 ascends Mt. Fowlkes in the distance.

== Spur 80 ==
State Highway Spur 80
- Location: Smith County
- Length: 0.11 mi (180 m)
- Existed: September 25, 1939–present

Spur 80 is located in Arp. It runs along Main Street from SH 135 southeastward approximately 0.11 miles (180 m) to Arnold Street.

Spur 80 was designated on September 25, 1939, on the current route.

== Spur 81 ==
State Highway Spur 81
- Location: Hidalgo County
- Length: 3.3 mi (5.3 km)
- Existed: August 16, 2023–present

Spur 81 is a proposed route in Hidalgo County. From FM 493 in southern Donna, it will run westward and northward 3.3 miles (5.3 km) to the future SH 68.

Spur 81 was designated on August 16, 2023.

== Spur 84 ==
State Highway Spur 84
- Location: Hansford County
- Existed: December 18, 1939–September 26, 1945

Spur 84 was designated on December 18, 1939, from SH 282 (now SH 15) to Gruver. On May 18, 1944, sections to serve the town and a return connection to the spur were added, forming a loop, although the route was still designated as Spur 84. On September 26, 1945, Spur 84 was cancelled and became a portion of FM 289 (now SH 15) and the remainder was changed to Loop 84.

== Spur 85 ==
State Highway Spur 85
- Location: San Augustine County
- Length: 1.067 mi (1.717 km)
- Existed: December 18, 1939–present

Spur 85 is located in San Augustine County. It runs from SH 21 to FM 1277.

Spur 85 was designated on December 18, 1939, from SH 21, 4 miles (6.4 km) west of San Augustine, to the monument commemorating the spot where the first Presbyterian Church was established in Texas.

== Spur 86 ==
State Highway Spur 86
- Location: Bowie County
- Existed: November 30, 1961–present

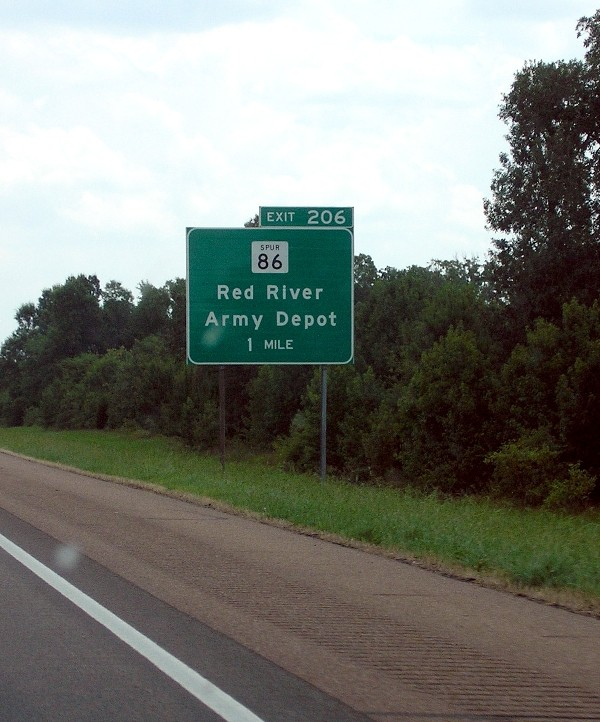
Approaching Spur 86 along eastbound I-30

Spur 86 is located in Bowie County. It connects Interstate 30 at exit 206 to US 82 near Hooks. The route provides access to the Red River Army Depot. The roadway north of the interchange with I-30 is County Road 2110.

Spur 86 was designated on November 30, 1961, on the current route.

=== Spur 86 (1940) ===
State Highway Spur 86
- Location: Brazos County
- Existed: January 27, 1940–January 30, 1951

A previous highway designated Spur 86 existed from January 27, 1940, to January 30, 1951, and connected SH 6 to the Administration Building of Texas A&M University (then known as A&M College). This route was SH 224 prior to 1939.

== Spur 87 ==
State Highway Spur 87
- Location: Kaufman County
- Length: 0.260 mi (418 m)
- Existed: November 21, 1963–present

Spur 87 is located in Kaufman County. It runs from US 80 to the Terrell State Hospital.

Spur 87 was designated on November 21, 1963, on the current route.

== Spur 89 ==
State Highway Spur 89
- Location: Anderson County
- Existed: April 15, 1940–January 27, 1953

Spur 89 was designated on April 15, 1940, from US 79 to Old Fort Houston. On January 27, 1953, Spur 89 was cancelled and transferred to FM Spur 1990.

== Spur 90 ==
State Highway Spur 90
- Location: Smith County
- Existed: May 21, 1940–July 1, 1940

Spur 90 was designated on May 21, 1940, from US 271 to Winona. Two months later Spur 90 was cancelled because it was already part of SH 155.

== Spur 91 ==
State Highway Spur 91
- Location: Victoria County
- Length: 1.005 mi (1.617 km)
- Existed: March 26, 1958–present

Spur 91 is located in Victoria County. It functions as a ramp from US 77 northbound to US 59 northbound, and vice versa southbound.

Spur 91 was designated on March 26, 1958, on the current route. It will become a part of I-69E in the future.

=== Spur 91 (1940) ===
State Highway Spur 91
- Location: Goliad County
- Existed: May 9, 1940–July 1, 1940

The original Spur 91 was designated on May 9, 1940, from US 59 to Fannin State Park as a replacement of SH 162. Its mileage was transferred to PR 27 on July 1, 1940.

== Spur 92 ==
State Highway Spur 92
- Location: Fayette County
- Length: 0.334 mi (538 m)
- Existed: May 9, 1940–present

Spur 92 is located in Fayette County. It runs from US 77/FM 155 to Monument Hill State Park.

Spur 92 was designated on May 9, 1940, from US 77 south of La Grange to the tomb of the men of the Mier expedition and Dawson massacre as a redesignation of SH 167. On May 5, 1966, the road was adjusted to run from US 77 and FM 155 west to the park after a more direct route was constructed; the old route was cancelled and removed from the highway system.

== Spur 93 ==
State Highway Spur 93
- Location: Jefferson County
- Length: 11.436 mi (18.404 km)
- Existed: March 24, 1993–present

Spur 93 is located in Jefferson County. It runs from US 69/US 96/US 287 south of Beaumont to SH 73. The route is known locally as West Port Arthur Road.

Spur 93 was designated on March 24, 1993, from US 69/US 96/US 287 south of Beaumont, south 8.9 miles (14.3 km) to FM 365. Five months later the road was extended 2.6 miles (4.2 km) south to SH 73, replacing a section of FM 823 (the remaining section of FM 823 was later cancelled entirely).

=== Spur 93 (1939) ===
State Highway Spur 93
- Location: Matagorda County
- Existed: May 9, 1940–July 9, 1951

The original Spur 93 was designated on September 26, 1939, from SH 35 to Blessing as a replacement of SH 177. On July 9, 1951, Spur 93 was cancelled and became a portion of FM 1727 (now FM 616).

== Spur 94 ==
State Highway Spur 94
- Location: Walker County
- Existed: May 9, 1940–October 26, 2006

Spur 94 was designated on May 9, 1940, from US 190 in Huntsville to Sam Houston's grave site as a replacement of SH 219. On October 26, 2006, Spur 94 was cancelled and returned to the city of Huntsville.

== Spur 95 ==
State Highway Spur 95
- Location: Gonzales County
- Length: 1.053 mi (1.695 km)
- Existed: May 9, 1940–present

Spur 95 is located in Gonzales County. It begins at SH 97 on the eastern edge of Cost. The 1.1-mile (1.8 km) rural route proceeds northward along gentle grades to a point near the confluence of Stevens Creek with the Guadalupe River. where a monument commemorates the first shot fired in the Texas Revolution during the Battle of Gonzales. The road has a turnaround loop at its northern end.

Spur 95 was originally designated State Highway 226, which was built between 1936 and 1938. The road was reclassified with its current spur designation on May 9, 1940.

== Spur 96 ==
State Highway Spur 96
- Location: Waller County
- Existed: May 9, 1940–July 9, 1951

Spur 96 was designated on May 9, 1940, from US 290 to Prairie View College as a redesignation of SH 244. On October 15, 1946, the road was extended north to a county road and a loop around the campus with connections to Spur 96 was added. Spur 96 was cancelled on July 9, 1951: the section from US 290 to the campus itself became a portion of FM 1098 and the remainder was renumbered as Loop 96 (which also became part of FM 1098 in 1953).

== Spur 97 ==
State Highway Spur 97
- Location: Tarrant County
- Length: 0.589 mi (948 m)
- Existed: July 30, 1974–present

Spur 97, also known as the International Parkway, runs from the south entrance to Dallas/Fort Worth International Airport south to SH 183. It serves as a tolled access road to the airport.

Spur 97 was designated on July 30, 1974, on the current route.

=== Spur 97 (1940) ===
State Highway Spur 97
- Location: Cass County
- Existed: May 9, 1940–September 26, 1945

The first use of the Spur 97 designation was in Cass County, from SH 77 to Marietta as a redesignation of SH 245. Spur 97 was cancelled on September 26, 1945, and became a portion of FM 250.

=== Spur 97 (1965) ===
State Highway Spur 97
- Location: Harris County
- Existed: March 31, 1965–April 2, 1969

The next use of the Spur 97 designation was in Harris County, from I-610 and SH 225 to Lawndale Avenue in Houston. Spur 97 was cancelled and redesignated as a portion of SH 225 when it was extended to US 59 in downtown Houston.

== Spur 98 ==
State Highway Spur 98
- Location: Kerr County
- Length: 2.215 mi (3.565 km)
- Existed: May 9, 1940–April 29, 2010

Spur 98 was designated on May 9, 1940, from SH 16 near the south end of the Guadalupe River Bridge at Kerrville to the then-new State Negro Sanitarium (now Kerrville State Hospital) as a redesignation of SH 248. On August 27, 1978, the road was extended northwest 1.8 miles (2.9 km). Spur 98 was cancelled on April 29, 2010, and changed to Loop 98.

== Spur 99 ==
Spur 99 is a designation that has been used for two different routes, one in Austin County and the other in Cameron County.

=== Spur 99 (1940) ===
State Highway Spur 99
- Location: Austin County
- Length: 2.3 mi (3.7 km)
- Existed: May 9, 1940–January 20, 1966

The first use of the Spur 99 designation was in Austin County, from SH 73 (now I-10) via San Felipe to the Brazos River as a redesignation of SH 249. Spur 99 was cancelled on January 20, 1966, and transferred to FM 1458.

=== Spur 99 (1981) ===
State Highway Spur 99
- Location: Cameron County
- Length: 0.7 mi (1,100 m)
- Existed: June 23, 1981–August 20, 1984

The next use of the Spur 99 designation was in Cameron County, from SH 345 northwest 0.7 miles (1.1 km) to Combes Street in San Benito. Spur 99 was cancelled when it was completed.
