= Texas State Highway 24 =

State highway in Texas

State Highway 24
- State Highway 24 highlighted in red

Route information
- Maintained by TxDOT
- Length: 31.177 mi (50.175 km)
- Existed: June 21, 1917–present

Major junctions
- South end: I-30 / US 67 near Campbell
- North end: Bus. US 82 / Bus. US 271 / SH 19 in Paris

Location
- Country: United States
- State: Texas
- Counties: Hunt, Delta, Lamar

Highway system
- Highways in Texas; Interstate; US; State; Former; Toll; Loops; Spurs; FM/RM; Park; Rec
| ← SH 23 | → SH 25 |

State Highway 24 (SH 24) runs from Campbell to Paris in north Texas. It is a portion of the main route, along with Interstate 30, from Paris to the Dallas–Fort Worth metroplex.

== History ==
Historic SH 24

On June 21, 1917, SH 24 was designated from Denton to Whitesboro. The historic routing of SH 24 was one of the 25 original Texas state highways. On August 21, 1923, the routing had changed substantially. The original Denton to Whitesboro route was removed from the state highway system (it was later SH 10). A portion of the former SH 28 from Jacksboro to Benjamin was reassigned as SH 24. A portion of SH 22 from Graham to Olney that was concurrent with SH 28, was also signed as SH 24, and was not concurrent with another state highway as there were two state routes that replaced part of SH 22 north and south of SH 24. By 1929, the highway was extended south from Jacksboro to Mineral Wells, replacing a portion of the former SH 25. On May 25, 1929, plans were to extend the highway west to Guthrie once the location was decided. On December 17, 1929, the location was decided. On March 19, 1930, SH 24 extended west to New Mexico, replacing most of SH 53 and all of SH 134. On June 24, 1931, the road from Jacksboro to Mineral Wells was transferred to SH 66. SH 24 was rerouted northeast to Paris, replacing SH 39. On September 21, 1937, SH 24 Spur was designated in Frisco. On January 25, 1938, SH 24 Spur was designated in Klondike. By May 24, 1938, SH 24 Spur was designated in Whiteface and SH 24 Loop was designated in Levelland. On September 20, 1938, another SH 24 Spur was being constructed to Lorenzo. The spur to Lorenzo was designated on June 20, 1939. But on September 26, 1939, this extended western plan had been dropped and the highway was rerouted west of Newcastle over the portion of SH 120 from Newcastle to Old Glory. The old route had been transferred to SH 251 (one two-block section now FM 926), SH 199 (this section now part of SH 114), U.S. Highway 82, and the western section was renumbered as SH 290 (now part of SH 114). The SH 24 Loop and SH 24 Spur designations were transferred to Spur 26 (Lorenzo), Spur 33 (Frisco), Spur 39 (Klondike), Loop 44 (Levelland), and Spur 74 (Whiteface)

On October 1, 1968, the portion between Jacksboro and Bridgeport was rerouted south of Lake Bridgeport, replacing State Highway 824, which was an alternate route designated in 1964, and all of RM 2475.

On September 1, 1971, the portions west of Greenville (Greenville to Old Glory) were removed from SH 24 and assigned to U.S. Highway 380. Later, on May 21, 1979, the part of SH 24 southwest of Commerce was moved to a different highway (replaced between Commerce and Greenville with SH 224), making it concurrent with SH 50 down to Campbell, which shortened SH 24 to its present form. On September 24, 2009, SH 50's concurrency with SH 24 was removed.

== Business routes ==
SH 24 has one business route.

Business State Highway 24-D (formerly Loop 457) is a business loop that runs through Cooper. The route was created in 1968 when SH 24 was rerouted west and north around town; it is 1.9 mi (3.1 km). The road was redesignated as Business SH 24-D on June 21, 1990.

=== Former Commerce business loop ===

Business State Highway 24-B (formerly Loop 216) was a business loop that ran through Commerce. The route was created in 1958 when SH 24 (now SH 224) was rerouted north of town. The route was redesignated as Business SH 24-B on June 21, 1990, but was redesignated again to Business SH 224-B on April 27, 2000.

== Major intersections ==
| County | Location | mi | km | Destinations | Notes |
|---|---|---|---|---|---|
| Hunt | | 0.000– 0.089 | 0.000– 0.143 | I-30 (US 67) / FM 1737 – Dallas, Sulphur Springs, Texarkana | Southern terminus. Exit 101 on I-30 |
| Hunt | Campbell | 0.350 | 0.563 | FM 499 west | Southern end of FM 499 concurrency |
| Hunt | Campbell | 2.307 | 3.713 | FM 499 east – Campbell | Northern terminus of FM 499 concurrency |
| Hunt | Campbell | 3.306 | 5.320 | FM 513 south – Campbell | Northern terminus of FM 513 |
| Hunt | | 4.875 | 7.846 | FM 2736 west | Eastern terminus of FM 2736 |
| Hunt | | 7.397 | 11.904 | FM 1568 south | Northern terminus of FM 1568 |
| Hunt | Commerce | 9.416 | 15.154 | SH 11 east / Loop 178 (Culver Street) | Southern terminus of SH 11 concurrency |
| Hunt | Commerce | 10.102 | 16.258 | Bus. SH 224 (Live Oak Street) | |
| Hunt | Commerce | 10.495 | 16.890 | SH 224 | |
| Hunt | Commerce | 10.769– 11.418 | 17.331– 18.375 | SH 11 / Bus. SH 11 – Wolfe City, Sulphur Springs | Interchange. Northern terminus of SH 11 concurrency |
| Hunt | Commerce | 12.320 | 19.827 | SH 50 north / SH 224 west – Ladonia | Southern terminus of SH 50; eastern terminus of SH 224 |
| Delta | | 14.832 | 23.870 | FM 904 north – Pecan Gap | Southern terminus of FM 904 |
| Delta | | 16.351 | 26.314 | FM 3132 north | Southern terminus of FM 3132 |
| Delta | | 17.505 | 28.172 | FM 1531 south | Northern terminus of FM 1531 |
| Delta | | 18.669 | 30.045 | FM 2890 east | Western terminus of FM 2890 |
| Delta | Klondike | 19.996 | 32.180 | FM 1528 west | Southern terminus of FM 1528 concurrency |
| Delta | Klondike | 20.184 | 32.483 | FM 1528 east | Northern terminus of FM 1528 concurrency |
| Delta | Cooper | 24.130 | 38.833 | Bus. SH 24 – Cooper, Cooper State Park | Southern terminus of TX Bus SH 24 |
| Delta | Cooper | 24.465 | 39.373 | FM 64 | |
| Delta | Cooper | 25.498 | 41.035 | Bus. SH 24 – Cooper | Northern terminus of Bus SH 24 |
| Delta | Cooper | 25.852 | 41.605 | FM 128 west – Ben Franklin, Big Creek Lake | Eastern terminus of FM 128 |
| Delta | | 27.878 | 44.865 | FM 2949 north – Enloe | Southern terminus of FM 2949 |
| Delta | | 28.731 | 46.238 | FM 2716 south | Northern terminus of FM 3132 |
| Delta | | 31.906 | 51.348 | SH 19 south – Sulphur Springs | Southern terminus of SH 19 concurrency |
| Delta | | 32.554 | 52.391 | FM 198 – Lake Creek | |
| Delta | | 33.194 | 53.421 | FM 1335 south | Northern terminus of FM 1335 |
| Lamar | | 37.701 | 60.674 | FM 1184 – Howland, Broadway | |
| Lamar | | 41.200 | 66.305 | FM 2036 west – Atlas | Eastern terminus of FM 2036 |
| Lamar | Paris | 45.511– 45.625 | 73.243– 73.426 | Loop 286 to US 82 / US 271 – Bonham, Clarksville, Mount Pleasant | Interchange |
| Lamar | Paris | 46.156 | 74.281 | FM 1497 south (3rd Street) | Northern terminus of FM 1497 |
| Lamar | Paris | 46.540 | 74.899 | FM 1507 east (Evergreen Street) – Eiffel Tower | Western terminus of FM 1507 |
| Lamar | Paris | 47.771 | 76.880 | Bus. US 82 west / Bus. US 271 south (Clarksville Street) Bus. US 82 west / Bus. US 271 north (Bonham Street) | Northern terminus |
1.000 mi = 1.609 km; 1.000 km = 0.621 mi: Concurrency terminus
