= Antioch, Delta County, Texas =

Antioch, Texas
- Unincorporated community
- Location within Texas
- Coordinates: 33°22′40″N 95°48′02″W
- Country: United States
- State: Texas
- Counties: Delta
- Elevation: 518 ft (158 m)

Population (2000)
  - Total: 25
- Time zone: UTC-6 (Central (CST))
  - Summer (DST): UTC-5 (CDT)
- ZIP code: 75469, 75432
- Area codes: 903, 430
- GNIS feature ID: 1379354

Antioch is an unincorporated community in Delta County, in the U.S. state of Texas. According to the Handbook of Texas, the community had a population of 25 in 2000.

== History ==
Originally included in the Moses Williams land grant, the location was settled by 1849 when the Antioch Cemetery's four trustees were granted land title. Early on, cotton was a significant local crop; but, once Charles H. "Honey" Smith founded the company in 1850, honey took center stage. The Antioch Baptist Church joined the Delta County Baptist Association in 1889. The following year saw the town's establishment. Maps from 1936 did not identify the location, although they did indicate a single company and a number of residences. The location included the church and a few dispersed homes in 1964. Antioch first appeared on maps in 1984 and had a population of 25 from 1970 through 2000.

== Geography ==
Antioch is located at the intersection of Farm to Market Road 64 and Farm to Market Road 1528, 6 mi (9.7 km) west of Cooper in western Delta County.

== Education ==
The first school in Antioch opened in 1879. Classes were also held at the local church. In 1905, Antioch School had 95 students and two teachers. It was listed in the 1936 county highway map. As of 1950, Antioch has been served by both the Fannindel Independent School District and Cooper Independent School District.
