= Texas State Highway 224 =

State highway in Texas

State Highway 224
- SH 224; mainline in red, business route in blue

Route information
- Maintained by TxDOT
- Length: 14.901 mi (23.981 km)
- Existed: 1979–present

Major junctions
- West end: SH 34 in Greenville
- East end: SH 24 / SH 50 in Commerce

Location
- Country: United States
- State: Texas

Highway system
- Highways in Texas; Interstate; US; State; Former; Toll; Loops; Spurs; FM/RM; Park; Rec
← SH 223	→ SH 225

State Highway 224 (SH 224) is a Texas state highway running from Greenville northeast to Commerce. The route was designated in 1979 as a renumbering of a portion of its parent SH 24 when it was rerouted southward from Commerce along SH 50.

== History ==
=== Previous route ===
On October 22, 1935, SH 224 was designated as a route from SH 6 to the A&M University Administration Building via New Main Drive. This route was canceled on September 26, 1939, and it was redesignated on January 27, 1940, as Spur 86 (erroneously omitted from the renumbering). Spur 86 was canceled on January 30, 1951.

=== Current route ===
The current version of SH 224 was designated on May 21, 1979, assuming the former routing of SH 24 when that highway was realigned onto SH 50. On February 22, 2001, the western end of SH 224 was truncated to SH 34. At that time, the concurrency between SH 224 and SH 34 was eliminated and the portion of SH 224 between SH 34 and US 69 was redesignated as Spur 302.

== Business routes ==
SH 224 has one business route.

=== Commerce business loop ===
Business State Highway 224-B
- Location: Commerce
- Existed: 2000–present

Business State Highway 224-B (Bus. SH 224-B) is a business loop that runs on the former routing of SH 224 through Commerce. The route was created on April 27, 2000, replacing Business SH 24-B.

== Junction list ==
The entire route is in Hunt County.

Location	mi	km	Destinations	Notes
Greenville	0.0	0.0	SH 34 – Terrell, Wolfe City	
	1.9	3.1	FM 118	
	3.8	6.1	FM 2736 east	
Neylandville	6.8	10.9	FM 2874 east	
Commerce	11.3	18.2	Loop 178 – Texas A&M University-Commerce	Interchange
Commerce	12.2	19.6	Bus. SH 224 east / FM 2874 west – Commerce	
Commerce	13.0	20.9	SH 11 / SH 24 – Cooper, Commerce	
Commerce	13.6	21.9	Bus. SH 11 – Wolfe City, Sulphur Springs	interchange
Commerce	13.8	22.2	Bus. SH 224 – Cooper State Park South Sulphur Unit	
Commerce	14.9	24.0	SH 24 / SH 50 – Greenville, Cooper	
1.000 mi = 1.609 km; 1.000 km = 0.621 mi
