= Texas State Highway 50 =

State highway in Texas

State Highway 50

Route information
- Maintained by TxDOT
- Length: 11.679 mi (18.796 km)
- Existed: 1965–present

Major junctions
- South end: SH 24 / SH 224 near Commerce
- North end: SH 34 in Ladonia

Location
- Country: United States
- State: Texas
- Counties: Hunt, Fannin

Highway system
- Highways in Texas; Interstate; US; State; Former; Toll; Loops; Spurs; FM/RM; Park; Rec
← SH 49	→ SH 51

State Highway 50 (SH 50) is a 11.679-mile-long (18.796 km) state highway in the northeastern part of the U.S. state of Texas. Its southern terminus is at SH 24 and SH 224 near Commerce. Its northern terminus is at SH 34 in Ladonia. It previously extended northward from Ladonia to Honey Grove, concurrent with SH 34, and southward to Interstate 30 (I-30), concurrent with SH 24. The duplications of these highways were removed in 2003 and 2009, respectively.

== History ==
Historic SH 50

SH 50 was originally proposed on August 21, 1923 as a renumbering of a portion of SH 2 between Henrietta and Bowie, when the route of SH 2 was readjusted farther east. This designation was replaced on September 26, 1939 by U.S. Highway 287 (US 287). SH 50 was designated on May 1, 1965, traveling from I-30 to SH 24, replacing part of Spur 178, FM 513, and FM 499, and all of FM 819 from FM 499 to FM 513, which was cancelled. On December 17, 1970, SH 50 was extended north to Honey Grove concurrent with part of SH 34 and over part of SH 11. On April 27, 2000, SH 50 was rerouted in Commerce. On April 24, 2003, the section concurrent with SH 34 was cancelled. On September 24, 2009, the section concurrent with SH 24 was cancelled.

== Major intersections ==
County	Location	mi	km	Destinations	Notes
Hunt	Commerce	0.000	0.000	SH 24 / SH 224 – Cooper, Greenville	Southern terminus
Hunt		3.0	4.8	FM 1563 – Fairlie	
Hunt		4.0	6.4	FM 2068	
Hunt		7.7	12.4	FM 1532	
Fannin	Ladonia	10.2	16.4	FM 2456	
Fannin	Ladonia	11.679	18.796	SH 34 – Wolfe City, Honey Grove	Northern terminus
1.000 mi = 1.609 km; 1.000 km = 0.621 mi
