= Marshall Robnett =

American football player (1918–1967)

No. 21, 43
- Positions: Center, guard

Personal information
- Born: March 18, 1918; Klondike, Texas, U.S.
- Died: November 28, 1967 (aged 49); Dallas, Texas, U.S.
- Listed height: 6 ft 0 in (1.83 m)
- Listed weight: 205 lb (93 kg)

Career information
- High school: Cooper (Cooper, Texas)
- College: East Texas A&M, Texas A&M
- NFL draft: 1941: 6th round, 43rd overall pick

Career history
- Chicago Cardinals (1943); "Card-Pitt" (1944); Chicago Cardinals (1945)

Awards and highlights
- National champion (1939); Consensus All-American (1940); Second-team All-American (1939); 2× First-team All-SWC (1939, 1940)

Career NFL statistics
- Games played: 22
- Games started: 11
- Extra Point Attempted/Made: 1/1
- Stats at Pro Football Reference

Marshall Foch Robnett (March 18, 1918 – November 28, 1967) was an American professional football player in the National Football League (NFL). He played professionally from 1943 until 1945 for the Chicago Cardinals and was included on their merged team with the Pittsburgh Steelers, known as "Card-Pitt", in 1944.

Prior to his professional career, Robnett played college football for the Texas A&M Aggies, earning consensus All-American honors as a senior. In 1940 after helping the Aggies to two straight Southwest Conference titles and the 1939 national championship, Robnett finished ninth in the 1940 Heisman Trophy balloting while being one of the primary blockers for Heisman runner-up John Kimbrough. Robnett's performance at Texas A&M helped make him a sixth-round draft choice by the Cardinals in 1941.

Marshall was also the older brother of Ed Robnett, who also played at Texas A&M. He was also a pro football player, however Ed played in the All-America Football Conference (AAFC) for the San Francisco 49ers in 1947.

== See also ==
- 1939 Texas A&M Aggies football team
- 1940 Texas A&M Aggies football team
- Ed Robnett

== Sources ==
- Texas A&M Official Athletic Site: 1st Team All-Americans
- Forr, James (2003). "Card-Pitt: The Carpits" (PDF). Coffin Corner. Vol. 25, no. 3. pp. 1–8. Archived from the original (PDF) on October 22, 2012 – via Professional Football Researchers Association.
