= Klondike, Delta County, Texas =

- Unincorporated community
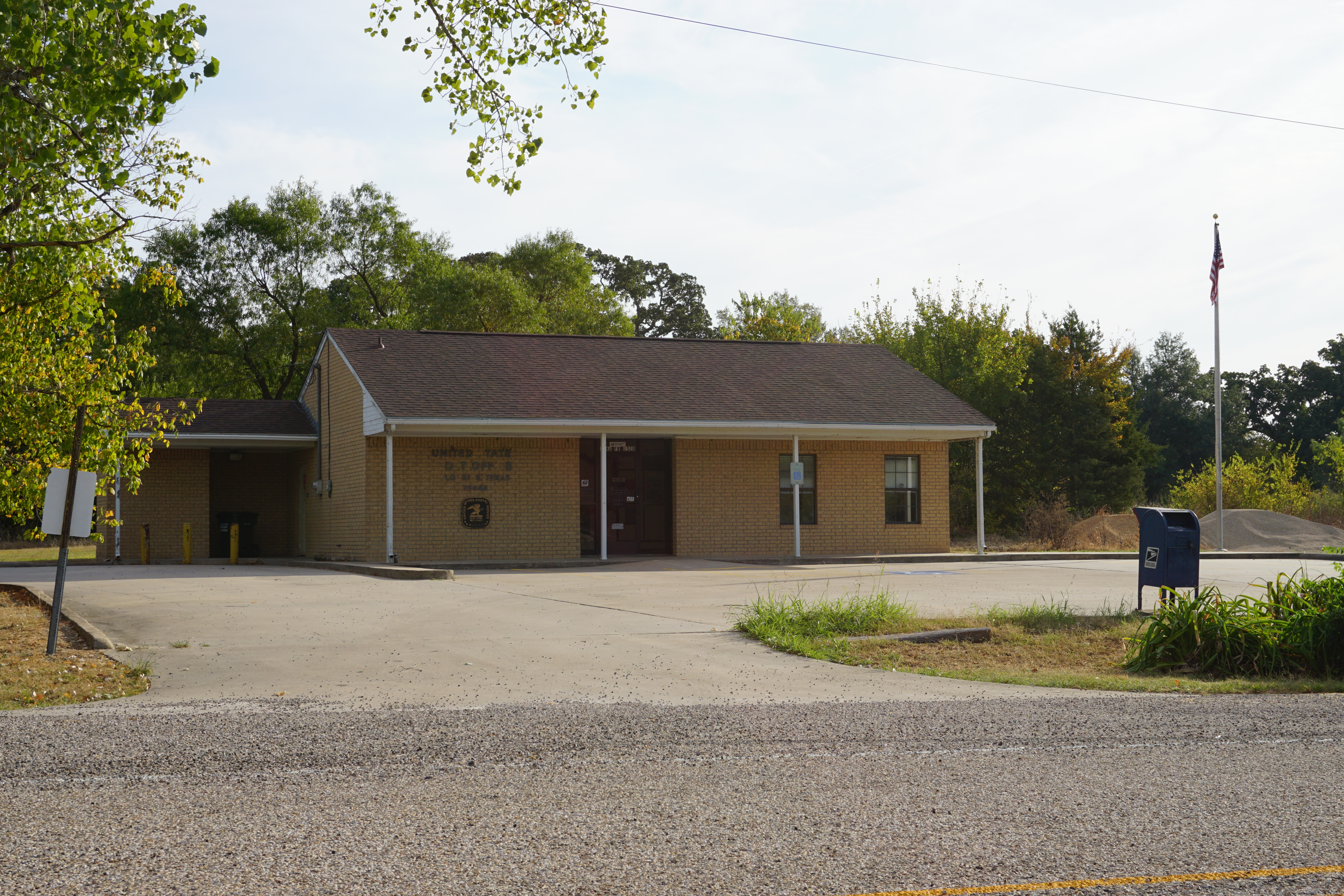
- The United States Post Office in Klondike in October 2015

- Location within Texas Location within the United States
- Coordinates: 33°19′47″N 95°45′29″W
- Country: United States
- State: Texas
- County: Delta
- Elevation: 472 ft (144 m)
- Time zone: UTC-6 (Central (CST))
  - Summer (DST): UTC-5 (CDT)
- Area codes: 903 & 430
- GNIS feature ID: 1360713

Klondike is an unincorporated community in Delta County, Texas, United States. According to the Handbook of Texas, its population was estimated at 135 in 2000.

== History ==
John Hunt gave the land for Pleasant Grove Cemetery in 1852, marking the beginning of the area's settlement. There had been a Methodist congregation since the 1860s. Pleasant Grove became a railroad stop when the Texas-Midland Railroad constructed a line through it to Cooper, the county seat, in 1895. The town had 75 residents in August 1897. After renaming the church as Klondike Baptist Church of Christ after two months, four of them founded the New Prospect Baptist Church. In commemoration of the Canadian Klondike, the location of the gold rush, Joel Jefferson Hunt petitioned for a postal franchise that same year under the name Klondike. The town had 151 residents by 1904, and the Baptists had constructed a new building in 1901. A telegraph office, a telephone exchange, a blacksmith shop, a hardware store, a drugstore, three general stores, and a dry goods store served 400 residents and three doctors in the town in 1914. The president of First State Bank, which had a $20,000 capital, was J. J. Hunt. There were two sizable cotton gins, and the shipment of cotton was the main business. Throughout the next ten years, Klondike continued to be a busy shipping hub; in 1929, 350 people were living there. However, the cotton boom's affluence was short-lived, as the Great Depression drove out residents of the neighboring rural areas. 154 people were living in Klondike in 1933. The village has one cemetery and two churches according to maps from 1936. In the 1940s and 1950s, Klondike was home to 150 people and six businesses. Four churches, Pleasant Grove Cemetery, Klondike Cemetery, and 50 residences were shown on maps of the location from 1964. By 1976, a community center was finished. Three churches, two cemeteries, the post office, and two businesses were depicted on maps of Klondike in 1984. There were twelve enterprises and 135 persons in the town in 2000.

== Geography ==
Klondike is located at the intersection of Farm to Market Roads 1528 and 2890, 3 mi (4.8 km) southwest of Cooper in southwestern Delta County.

On January 25, 1938, a spur of Texas State Highway 24 was designated in Klondike.

== Education ==
A Methodist congregation and school first convened in the same structure on the property in the 1860s. The Methodists permitted the newly formed Baptist fellowship to use the school building. In the Klondike school district in 1905, there were two schools: one with 134 White pupils and three teachers, and one with 49 Black kids and one teacher. Following the school's 1945 fire, the West Delta school district was created by combining the Klondike and Shiloh school systems. Local kids were enrolled in the Cooper Independent School District by 1970.

== Notable people ==
Brothers Ed and Marshall Robnett, who played in the National Football League, were born in Klondike.

== See also ==
- Texas State Highway Spur 39
