= List of Farm to Market Roads in Texas (2800–2899) =

- Texas Farm to Market Road and Ranch to Market Road markers

Highway names
- Interstates: Interstate Highway X (IH-X, I-X)
- US Highways: U.S. Highway X (US X)
- State: State Highway X (SH X)
- Loops: Loop X
- Spurs: Spur X
- Recreational: Recreational Road X (RE X)
- Farm or Ranch to Market Roads: Farm to Market Road X (FM X); Ranch to Market Road X (RM X)
- Park Roads: Park Road X (PR X)

System links
- Highways in Texas; Interstate; US; State; Former; Toll; Loops; Spurs; FM/RM; Park; Rec

Farm to Market Roads in Texas are owned and maintained by the Texas Department of Transportation (TxDOT).

== FM 2800 ==
Farm to Market Road 2800
- Location: Jasper County
- Length: 4.779 mi (7.691 km)
- Existed: 1962–present

== FM 2801 ==
Farm to Market Road 2801
- Location: Angelina County
- Length: 1.649 mi (2.654 km)
- Existed: October 28, 1966–present

=== FM 2801 (1962) ===
Farm to Market Road 2801
- Location: Newton County
- Existed: May 2, 1962–May 25, 1966

A previous route numbered FM 2801 was designated on May 2, 1962, from US 190 northwest of Bon Wier to a point 5.0 miles (8.0 km) northeast. FM 2801 was cancelled on May 25, 1966, and became a portion of FM 2626.

== FM 2802 ==
Farm to Market Road 2802
- Location: Orange County
- Length: 9.031 mi (14.534 km)
- Existed: 1962–present

== FM 2803 ==
Farm to Market Road 2803
- Location: Palo Pinto and Erath counties
- Length: 4.181 mi (6.729 km)
- Existed: June 1, 1965–present

=== FM 2803 (1962) ===
Farm to Market Road 2803
- Location: Tyler County
- Length: 3.5 mi (5.6 km)
- Existed: May 2, 1962–May 26, 1964

A previous route numbered FM 2803 was designated on May 2, 1962, from FM 256 at Colmesneil to a point 3.5 miles (5.6 km) northwest. FM 2803 was cancelled on May 26, 1964, and transferred to FM 1745.

== RM 2804 ==
Ranch to Market Road 2804
- Location: Kinney County
- Length: 6.619 mi (10.652 km)
- Existed: 1962–present

== FM 2805 ==
Farm to Market Road 2805
- Location: Coleman County
- Length: 7.485 mi (12.046 km)
- Existed: 1962–present

== FM 2806 ==
Farm to Market Road 2806
- Location: Coleman County
- Length: 4.564 mi (7.345 km)
- Existed: 1962–present

== FM 2807 ==
Farm to Market Road 2807
- Location: Eastland County
- Length: 2.998 mi (4.825 km)
- Existed: 1962–present

== FM 2808 ==
Farm to Market Road 2808
- Location: Lampasas County
- Length: 4.444 mi (7.152 km)
- Existed: 1962–present

== FM 2809 ==
Farm to Market Road 2809
- Location: Culberson County
- Length: 4.943 mi (7.955 km)
- Existed: May 2, 1962–present

Farm to Market Road 2809 (FM 2809) is located in Culberson County in West Texas.

The southern terminus of FM 2809 is at FM 2185 northeast of Van Horn. It travels north for approximately 4.9 miles (7.9 km) before state maintenance ends. The roadway continues from this point as Whitehead Road.

FM 2809 was established on May 2, 1962, along its current route.

== RM 2810 ==
Ranch to Market Road 2810
- Location: Presidio County
- Length: 31.957 mi (51.430 km)
- Existed: 1962–present

Ranch to Market Road 2810 (RM 2810) is located in Presidio County. It is the paved, state-maintained portion of the Pinto Canyon Road that connects Ruidosa and Marfa. RM 2810 comprises roughly three-fifths of the road's overall length.

The southern terminus of RM 2810 is at a point 32 miles (51 km) southwest of Marfa, where pavement and state maintenance begin along the Pinto Canyon Road in Cleveland Flat near Wild Horse Draw. The two-lane route proceeds to the northwest along the northern fringe of the Cuesta del Burro range of the Chinati Mountains. The road then emerges onto Ryan Flat approaching Marfa. In the city, RM 2810 turns north along South Hoover Street before reaching its northern terminus at US 90.

RM 2810 was designated on May 2, 1962, as a 10-mile (16 km) route extending southwest from US 90 in Marfa. The route was extended by 8 miles (13 km) on June 26, 1963, and by 14 miles (23 km) to its present length on June 1, 1965.

== FM 2811 ==
Farm to Market Road 2811
- Location: Knox County
- Length: 5.585 mi (8.988 km)
- Existed: 1962–present

== FM 2812 ==
Farm to Market Road 2812
- Location: Hidalgo County
- Length: 10.858 mi (17.474 km)
- Existed: 1962–present

== FM 2813 ==
Farm to Market Road 2813
- Location: Smith County
- Length: 2.377 mi (3.825 km)
- Existed: May 2, 1962–present

Farm to Market Road 2813 (FM 2813) is a 2.377-mile (3.825 km) state road in Smith County, running near southern Tyler.

FM 2813 begins at an intersection with FM 2493 in Gresham, south of Tyler and east of Noonday. The highway runs east through unincorporated Smith County before entering the Tyler city limits near County Roads 128/134. FM 2813 ends at an intersection with US 69 in southern central Tyler, with the road continuing east as Marsh Farm Road. For its entire length, FM 2813 runs closely parallel and south of Loop 49.

FM 2813 was designated on May 2, 1962, along the current route.

== FM 2814 ==
Farm to Market Road 2814
- Location: Gonzales County
- Length: 5.623 mi (9.049 km)
- Existed: June 25, 1962–present

Farm to Market Road 2814 (FM 2814) is located in Gonzales County. It runs from SH 97 south of Waelder southward to the community of Hickston.

FM 2814 was designated on June 25, 1962, from SH 97 southward 3.9 miles (6.3 km). On June 28, 1963, the designation was extended southward 2.2 miles (3.5 km) to its current terminus at Hickston.

== FM 2815 ==
Farm to Market Road 2815
- Location: Fannin County
- Length: 3.841 mi (6.181 km)
- Existed: 1963–present

== FM 2816 ==
Farm to Market Road 2816
- Location: DeWitt County
- Length: 3.143 mi (5.058 km)
- Existed: 1963–present

== FM 2817 ==
Farm to Market Road 2817
- Location: Wharton County
- Length: 2.558 mi (4.117 km)
- Existed: June 28, 1963–present

Farm to Market Road 2817 (FM 2817) is located in Wharton County. It runs from FM 1301 southeast of Wharton to FM 3012.

FM 2817 was designated on June 28, 1963, on the current route.

== FM 2818 ==
Farm to Market Road 2818
- Location: Brazos County
- Length: 15.552 mi (25.029 km)
- Existed: June 28, 1963–present

Farm to Market Road 2818 (FM 2818), also known as Harvey Mitchell Parkway, runs from SH 6 in College Station, northwestward to SH 6 and US 190 in Bryan. This route is a western bypass of the cities of College Station and Bryan. It runs through the Texas A&M University campus and next to the George Bush Presidential Library and Easterwood Airport. The road's namesake, Harvey Mitchell, was an early settler of the area, who obtained the original land offered to the state for the creation of A&M.

FM 2818 was designated on June 28, 1963, from SH 21 southwest to FM 2513 (now Turkey Creek Rd., as the route was turned over to city of Bryan in 1989). On June 1, 1965, it was extended south to SH 6, replacing the section of FM 2513 from FM 2818 and Turkey Creek Road to FM 60 and Spur 135 from FM 60 south to the center of the Texas A&M airport. On August 31, 1967, it was extended north to SH 6. On January 27, 1988, it was extended from former SH 6 (former Loop 507, now Bus. SH 6) to new SH 6. On June 27, 1995, the entire route was redesignated Urban Road 2818 (UR 2818). The designation reverted to FM 2818 with the elimination of the Urban Road system on November 15, 2018.

In 2021, TxDOT began a project to widen Harvey Mitchell Parkway in College Station. Construction is expected to be completed in 2023.

Junction list

The entire route is in Brazos County.

Location	mi	km	Destinations	Notes
College Station	0.0	0.0	SH 6 (Earl Rudder Freeway) – Waco, Houston	
College Station	0.8	1.3	Bus. SH 6 (Texas Avenue)	
College Station	2.5	4.0	FM 2154 (Wellborn Road) – Texas A&M University	Interchange
College Station	2.8	4.5	Jones-Butler Road	Interchange; southbound exit and northbound entrance
College Station	4.4	7.1	FM 2347 (George Bush Drive) – George Bush Presidential Library	
College Station	5.2	8.4	FM 60 (Raymond Stotzer Parkway) – College Station, Snook, Easterwood Airport	Interchange
Bryan	7.3	11.7	FM 1179 (Villa Maria Road)	Interchange
Bryan	10.6	17.1	SH 21 – Caldwell, Madisonville	Interchange
Bryan	12.2	19.6	FM 1687 (Sandy Point Road) – Lake Bryan	
Bryan	15.5	24.9	US 190 / SH 6 – Waco, Houston	
1.000 mi = 1.609 km; 1.000 km = 0.621 mi: Incomplete access

== FM 2819 ==
Farm to Market Road 2819
- Location: Grimes County
- Length: 8.779 mi (14.128 km)
- Existed: 1963–present

== FM 2820 ==
Farm to Market Road 2820
- Location: Lamar County
- Length: 4.544 mi (7.313 km)
- Existed: September 1, 1964–present

=== FM 2820 (1963) ===
Farm to Market Road 2820
- Location: Williamson and Milam counties
- Existed: June 28, 1963–July 27, 1964

A previous route numbered FM 2820 was designated on June 28, 1963, from FM 486, 1 mile (1.6 km) south of San Gabriel, to a point 3.0 miles (4.8 km) west. On May 6, 1964, the road was extended west 2.2 miles (3.5 km) to FM 1331 at Hare. FM 2820 was cancelled on July 27, 1964, and transferred to FM 1331.

== FM 2821 ==
Farm to Market Road 2821
- Location: Walker County
- Length: 6.274 mi (10.097 km)
- Existed: 1963–present

== FM 2822 ==
Farm to Market Road 2822
- Location: McCulloch County
- Length: 6.933 mi (11.158 km)
- Existed: 1963–present

== FM 2823 ==
Farm to Market Road 2823
- Location: Comanche and Hamilton counties
- Length: 9.397 mi (15.123 km)
- Existed: 1963–present

== FM 2824 ==
Farm to Market Road 2824
- Location: Bee County
- Length: 6.149 mi (9.896 km)
- Existed: 1963–present

== FM 2825 ==
Farm to Market Road 2825
- Location: Red River County
- Length: 1.299 mi (2.091 km)
- Existed: September 30, 1974–present

=== FM 2825 (1963) ===
Farm to Market Road 2825
- Location: Goliad County
- Existed: June 28, 1963–November 17, 1972

A previous route numbered FM 2825 was designated on June 28, 1963, from US 183, 2.8 miles (4.5 km) south of Goliad, south 8.2 miles (13.2 km) to a road intersection. On November 5, 1971, the road was extended south 5.2 miles (8.4 km). FM 2825 was cancelled on November 17, 1972, and became a portion of FM 2441.

== FM 2826 ==
Farm to Market Road 2826
- Location: Nueces County
- Length: 12.721 mi (20.472 km)
- Existed: 1963–present

== FM 2827 ==
Farm to Market Road 2827
- Location: Tyler County
- Length: 5.554 mi (8.938 km)
- Existed: 1963–present

== RM 2828 ==
Ranch to Market Road 2828
- Location: Bandera County
- Length: 9.038 mi (14.545 km)
- Existed: November 19, 1964–present

Ranch to Market Road 2828 (RM 2828) is located in Bandera County in the Texas Hill Country.

RM 2828 begins at an intersection with SH 16 near Medina. The highway runs in a northeast direction before turning in a generally eastward direction. Just after an intersection with FM 3240, RM 2828 turns northeast before turning in a more northward direction. The highway turns back to the northeast before ending at an intersection with SH 173 just south of the Bandera–Kerr county line.

RM 2828 was designated on November 19, 1964, along the current route.

=== FM 2828 (1963) ===
Farm to Market Road 2828
- Location: Orange County
- Existed: June 28, 1963–May 26, 1964

RM 2828 was originally designated as FM 2828 on June 28, 1963, running from SH 62 to a point 4.0 miles (6.4 km) to the west. On May 26, 1964, the highway was cancelled and transferred to FM 2802.

== FM 2829 ==
Farm to Market Road 2829
- Location: Newton County
- Length: 2.005 mi (3.227 km)
- Existed: 1963–present

== FM 2830 ==
Farm to Market Road 2830
- Location: Liberty County
- Length: 6.395 mi (10.292 km)
- Existed: June 28, 1963–present

Farm to Market Road 2830 (FM 2830) is located in Liberty County. It runs from SH 146 south of Hardin to US 90. There is a brief concurrency with FM 160.

FM 2830 was designated on June 28, 1963, from SH 146 south of Hardin to a point 3.0 miles (4.8 km) southeast. On June 1, 1965, the road was extended south 4.1 miles (6.6 km) to US 90, creating a concurrency with FM 160.

== RM 2831 ==
Ranch to Market Road 2831
- Location: Llano County
- Length: 2.69 mi (4.33 km)
- Existed: July 31, 1975–present

=== FM 2831 (1963) ===
Farm to Market Road 2831
- Location: Jasper County
- Existed: June 28, 1963–June 12, 1974

FM 2831 was designated on June 28, 1963, from FM 1013 at Kirbyville to a point 7.0 miles (11.3 km). On May 6, 1964, the road was extended northwest 3.0 miles (4.8 km) to FM 1005 at Erin. On June 12, 1974, FM 2831 was cancelled and became a portion of FM 252.

== FM 2832 ==
Farm to Market Road 2832
- Location: Fisher County
- Length: 7.751 mi (12.474 km)
- Existed: 1963–present

== FM 2833 ==
Farm to Market Road 2833
- Location: Taylor and Jones counties
- Length: 9.64 mi (15.51 km)
- Existed: 1963–present

Farm to Market Road 2833 (FM 2833) is located in Taylor and Jones counties that runs through northern Abilene. The highway runs near the eastern shore of Fort Phantom Hill Lake. FM 2833 is known locally as East Lake Road.

FM 2833 begins at an intersection with SH 351 approximately 0.5 miles (0.80 km) northeast of I-20 in Abilene. The highway travels in a northward direction and passes by a housing development before leaving the Abilene city limits. FM 2833 passes by the Abilene Water Treatment Plant and the Abilene Police Training Center before reentering Abilene near the FM 3308 intersection. A couple of miles north of FM 3308, FM 2833 runs near the eastern shore of Fort Phantom Hill Lake, passing by the Fort Phantom Marina and lakeside subdivisions before ending at an intersection with FM 1082.

FM 2833 was first designated on June 29, 1963, running from SH 351 to Fishing Village at Fort Phantom Hill at a distance of 6.1 miles (9.8 km). On May 6, 1964, the highway was extended further north to its current terminus at FM 1082. On June 27, 1995, the section of FM 2833 from SH 351 to FM 3208 was redesignated Urban Road 2833 (UR 2833). The designation of this section reverted to FM 2833 with the elimination of the Urban Road system on November 15, 2018.

== FM 2834 ==
Farm to Market Road 2834
- Location: Jones County
- Length: 17.171 mi (27.634 km)
- Existed: 1963–present

== FM 2835 ==
Farm to Market Road 2835
- Location: Scurry and Mitchell counties
- Length: 6.636 mi (10.680 km)
- Existed: 1963–present

== FM 2836 ==
Farm to Market Road 2836
- Location: Mitchell County
- Length: 6.113 mi (9.838 km)
- Existed: 1963–present

== FM 2837 ==
Farm to Market Road 2837
- Location: McLennan County
- Length: 15.892 mi (25.576 km)
- Existed: 1963–present

== FM 2838 ==
Farm to Market Road 2838
- Location: Limestone County
- Length: 3.121 mi (5.023 km)
- Existed: 1963–present

== FM 2839 ==
Farm to Market Road 2839
- Location: Falls County
- Length: 2.914 mi (4.690 km)
- Existed: 1963–present

== FM 2840 ==
Farm to Market Road 2840
- Location: Bosque County
- Length: 2.648 mi (4.262 km)
- Existed: 1963–present

== FM 2841 ==
Farm to Market Road 2841
- Location: Bosque County
- Length: 2.386 mi (3.840 km)
- Existed: 1963–present

== FM 2842 ==
Farm to Market Road 2842
- Location: Hamilton County
- Length: 2.422 mi (3.898 km)
- Existed: 1963–present

== FM 2843 ==
Farm to Market Road 2843
- Location: Bell and Williamson counties
- Length: 14.61 mi (23.51 km)
- Existed: 1963–present

== FM 2844 ==
Farm to Market Road 2844
- Location: Starr County
- Length: 7.107 mi (11.438 km)
- Existed: 1963–present

== FM 2845 ==
Farm to Market Road 2845
- Location: Willacy County
- Length: 7.484 mi (12.044 km)
- Existed: 1963–present

== FM 2846 ==
Farm to Market Road 2846
- Location: Archer and Wichita counties
- Length: 7.623 mi (12.268 km)
- Existed: 1963–present

== FM 2847 ==
Farm to Market Road 2847
- Location: Clay County
- Length: 4.921 mi (7.920 km)
- Existed: June 28, 1963–present

Farm to Market Road 2847 (FM 2847) is located in Clay County.

FM 2847 is a shoulderless, two-lane route for its entire length. State maintenance of the roadway begins south of an intersection with FM 2606, which provides access westward to Lake Arrowhead, at an intersection with Gas Plant Road. The route continues northward and then eastward through unincorporated Clay County before ending at a junction with SH 148 south of Henrietta.

FM 2847 was designated on June 28, 1963, along its current route. The junction with FM 2606 was designated on November 16, 1968, when that route was added to the state highway system.

== FM 2848 ==
Farm to Market Road 2848
- Location: Cooke County
- Length: 3.607 mi (5.805 km)
- Existed: 1963–present

== FM 2849 ==
Farm to Market Road 2849
- Location: Montague County
- Length: 2.952 mi (4.751 km)
- Existed: June 28, 1963–present

Farm to Market Road 2849 (FM 2849) is located in Montague County.

The western terminus of FM 2849 is at an intersection with Gray Road, near the defunct community of Red River Station. It travels to the east before reaching its eastern terminus at FM 103.

FM 2849 was designated on June 28, 1963, along its current route.

== FM 2850 ==
Farm to Market Road 2850
- Location: Throckmorton County
- Length: 3.314 mi (5.333 km)
- Existed: 1963–present

== FM 2851 ==
Farm to Market Road 2851
- Location: San Augustine County
- Length: 0.470 mi (756 m)
- Existed: October 28, 1966–present

=== FM 2851 (1963) ===
Farm to Market Road 2851
- Location: Young County
- Existed: June 28, 1963–June 1, 1966

A previous route numbered FM 2851 was designated on June 28, 1963, from SH 199 north 4.8 miles (7.7 km) to FM 1769 near Farmer. FM 2851 was cancelled on June 1, 1966, and became a portion of FM 2652.

== FM 2852 ==
Farm to Market Road 2852
- Location: Brazoria County
- Length: 1.426 mi (2.295 km)
- Existed: 1963–present

== FM 2853 ==
Farm to Market Road 2853
- Location: Matagorda County
- Length: 13.873 mi (22.326 km)
- Existed: 1963–present

== FM 2854 ==
Farm to Market Road 2854
- Location: Montgomery County
- Length: 16.527 mi (26.598 km)
- Existed: 1963–present

Junction list

County	Location	mi	km	Destinations	Notes
Montgomery				SH 105 – Montgomery, Navasota, Conroe	Western terminus; road continues north of SH 105 as Lone Star Parkway
Montgomery				Keenan Cut Off Road	Grade separation
Montgomery				Fish Creek Thoroughfare to FM 2978 / FM 1488 – The Woodlands, Tomball	Western half of a parclo interchange; provides access to FM 2978 and FM 1488
Montgomery				McCaleb Road to SH 105 – Lake Conroe	Eastern half of a parclo interchange; provides access to SH 105
Montgomery	Conroe			Loop 336 (Veterans Memorial Highway)	Parclo interchange; former FM 3374 north of FM 2854
Montgomery	Conroe			I-45 (North Freeway) – Houston, Huntsville, Dallas	I-45 exit 87 (southbound) and exit 87A (northbound)
Montgomery	Conroe			SH 75 (Frazier Street) – Conroe, Willis	Eastern terminus; former US 75; road continues east of SH 75 as Metcalf Street
Montgomery	1.000 mi = 1.609 km; 1.000 km = 0.621 mi				

== FM 2855 ==
Farm to Market Road 2855
- Location: Waller County
- Length: 6.07 mi (9.77 km)
- Existed: 1963–present

== FM 2856 ==
Farm to Market Road 2856
- Location: Deaf Smith County
- Length: 3.594 mi (5.784 km)
- Existed: 1963–present

== RM 2857 ==
Ranch to Market Road 2857
- Location: Gray County
- Length: 7.43 mi (11.96 km)
- Existed: 1963–present

== FM 2858 ==
Farm to Market Road 2858
- Location: Oldham County
- Length: 5.026 mi (8.089 km)
- Existed: 1963–present

== FM 2859 ==
Farm to Market Road 2859
- Location: Navarro County
- Length: 7.039 mi (11.328 km)
- Existed: 1963–present

== FM 2860 ==
Farm to Market Road 2860
- Location: Kaufman County
- Length: 7.761 mi (12.490 km)
- Existed: 1963–present

== FM 2861 ==
Farm to Market Road 2861
- Location: Comanche County
- Length: 6.104 mi (9.823 km)
- Existed: September 1, 1964–present

=== FM 2861 (1963) ===
Farm to Market Road 2861
- Location: Denton County
- Existed: June 28, 1963–May 25, 1964

A previous route numbered FM 2861 was designated on June 28, 1963, from FM 156 in Krum north 3.0 miles (4.8 km) to a road intersection. FM 2861 was cancelled on May 25, 1964, and transferred to FM 2450.

== FM 2862 ==
Farm to Market Road 2862
- Location: Collin County
- Length: 11.235 mi (18.081 km)
- Existed: 1963–present

Farm to Market Road 2862 (FM 2862)is a road that is located in the city of Anna, located in Collin County. The road starts west of State Highway 5 as 4th street. The road then turns left onto Houston Street. When FM 2862 enters Westminster, the road turns left onto Church Street, but shortly later turns back onto Houston street. Houston street passes through State Highway 121 before ending at FM 545.

== FM 2863 ==
Farm to Market Road 2863
- Location: Nacogdoches County
- Length: 2.784 mi (4.480 km)
- Existed: 1963–present

== FM 2864 ==
Farm to Market Road 2864
- Location: Nacogdoches County
- Length: 6.635 mi (10.678 km)
- Existed: 1963–present

== FM 2865 ==
Farm to Market Road 2865
- Location: Madison County
- Length: 2.524 mi (4.062 km)
- Existed: May 7, 1970–present

=== FM 2865 (1963) ===
Farm to Market Road 2865
- Location: Polk County
- Existed: June 28, 1963–February 23, 1970

A previous route numbered FM 2865 was designated on June 28, 1963, from US 190 south 1.3 miles (2.1 km) via Indian Village, replacing Spur 183. FM 2865 was cancelled on February 23, 1970, and redesignated as Park Road 56.

== FM 2866 ==
Farm to Market Road 2866
- Location: Sabine and San Augustine counties
- Length: 6.469 mi (10.411 km)
- Existed: 1963–present

== FM 2867 ==
Farm to Market Road 2867
- Location: Rusk County
- Length: 7.562 mi (12.170 km)
- Existed: June, 8,1963–present

Farm to Market Road 2867 is a 7.562-mile (12.170 km) state road in Rusk County, that connects Farm to Market Road 840 (southeast of Henderson) with Farm to Market Road 1798 in Pinehill.

== FM 2868 ==
Farm to Market Road 2868
- Location: Smith County
- Length: 4.114 mi (6.621 km)
- Existed: 1963–present

== FM 2869 ==
Farm to Market Road 2869
- Location: Wood County
- Length: 27.801 mi (44.741 km)
- Existed: 1963–present

== FM 2870 ==
Farm to Market Road 2870
- Location: Hood and Erath counties
- Length: 8.571 mi (13.794 km)
- Existed: 1963 (Note: FM 2870 was cancelled on January 2, 1976, before being designated again on September 3, 1976, along the same route.)–present

== RM 2871 ==
Ranch to Market Road 2871
- Location: Tarrant County
- Length: 5.332 mi (8.581 km)
- Existed: 1963–present

Ranch to Market Road 2871 (RM 2871) is located in Tarrant County, running from US 377 in Benbrook to I-30 in Fort Worth.

RM 2871 begins at an intersection with US 377 in Benbrook near Lake Benbrook. The highway runs in a generally northwest direction through eastern Benbrook, passing by several housing developments before leaving the town near Aledo Road. RM 2871 is known as Chapin School Road in Benbrook. The highway runs through less developed areas of Tarrant County, passing under I-20 before entering into Fort Worth near Mary's Creek. RM 2871 runs as a two lane road in Fort Worth, intersecting with Spur 580 and passing near the All Saint's Episcopal School before ending at I-30. The highway is known locally as Longvue Avenue in Fort Worth.

RM 2871 was designated on June 28, 1963, running from US 377 northward to White Settlement Road, at a distance of approximately 7.1 miles (11.4 km). On September 29, 1977, the section of highway between I-30 and White Settlement Road was cancelled. On June 27, 1995, the entire route was redesignated Urban Road 2871 (UR 2871). The designation reverted to RM 2871 with the elimination of the Urban Road system on November 15, 2018.

Junction list

The entire route is in Tarrant County.

Location	mi	km	Destinations	Notes
Benbrook	0.0	0.0	US 377 (Benbrook Boulevard)	
	2.4	3.9	I-20	I-20 exit 426
Fort Worth	4.7	7.6	Spur 580 (Camp Bowie West Boulevard)Former US 80	
Fort Worth	5.3	8.5	I-30 (West Freeway)	I-30 exit 3
1.000 mi = 1.609 km; 1.000 km = 0.621 mi

== FM 2872 ==
Farm to Market Road 2872
- Location: Runnels County
- Length: 10.9 mi (17.5 km)
- Existed: 1963–present

== FM 2873 ==
Farm to Market Road 2873
- Location: Menard County
- Length: 8.141 mi (13.102 km)
- Existed: 1963–present

It was originally Ranch to Market Road 2873 (RM 2873).

== FM 2874 ==
Farm to Market Road 2874
- Location: Hunt County
- Length: 6.084 mi (9.791 km)
- Existed: November 18, 1975–present

=== FM 2874 (1963) ===
Farm to Market Road 2874
- Location: Glasscock County
- Existed: June 28, 1963–September 20, 1973

A previous route numbered FM 2874 was designated on June 28, 1963, from RM 33, 9.9 miles (15.9 km) south of Garden City, via St. Lawrence to a point 5.0 miles (8.0 km) west of RM 33. On May 5, 1966, the road was extended west 5.8 miles (9.3 km) to RM 1800 (now SH 137). FM 2874 was cancelled on September 20, 1973, and transferred to RM 2401.

== FM 2875 ==
Farm to Market Road 2875
- Location: Childress County
- Length: 3.718 mi (5.984 km)
- Existed: 1963–present

== FM 2876 ==
Farm to Market Road 2876
- Location: Cottle County
- Length: 4.612 mi (7.422 km)
- Existed: 1963–present

== FM 2877 ==
Farm to Market Road 2877
- Location: Foard County
- Length: 4.804 mi (7.731 km)
- Existed: 1963–present

== FM 2878 ==
Farm to Market Road 2878
- Location: Bowie County
- Length: 2.463 mi (3.964 km)
- Existed: 1963–present

Farm to Market Road 2878 (FM 2878) is located in Bowie County. It is known in Texarkana as Pleasant Grove Road.

FM 2878 begins at an intersection with the westbound frontage road of I-30 near Nash and Texarkana. The highway travels in a generally northward direction and enters the city limits of Texarkana before turning east at Cooper Lane and runs eastward before turning back north at FM 1297 (McKnight Road)/University Avenue. FM 2878 resumes its northward direction, briefly running east between Chaparral Street and Constitution Drive. The highway runs north through the Pleasant Grove area of the city before ending at an intersection with FM 559, just south of Texas A&M University Texarkana.

FM 2878 was designated on June 28, 1963, running from I-30 to FM 559 along the current route. On June 27, 1995, the entire route was redesignated Urban Road 2878 (UR 2878). The designation reverted to FM 2878 with the elimination of the Urban Road system on November 15, 2018.

Junction list

The entire route is in Bowie County.

Location	mi	km	Destinations	Notes
	0.0	0.0	I-30 to FM 989	I-30 exit 218
Texarkana	1.0	1.6	FM 1297 east (McKnight Road) / University Avenue	
Texarkana	2.5	4.0	FM 559 (Richmond Road) / University Avenue – Texas A&M University Texarkana	
1.000 mi = 1.609 km; 1.000 km = 0.621 mi

== FM 2879 ==
Farm to Market Road 2879
- Location: Harrison County
- Length: 9.358 mi (15.060 km)
- Existed: 1963–present

== FM 2880 ==
Farm to Market Road 2880
- Location: Carson County
- Length: 8.609 mi (13.855 km)
- Existed: May 5, 1966–present

=== FM 2880 (1963) ===
Farm to Market Road 2880
- Location: Morris County
- Existed: June 28, 1963–February 28, 1966

A previous route numbered FM 2880 was designated on June 28, 1963, from US 259, 4 miles (6.4 km) south of Omaha, southeast 4.4 miles (7.1 km) to the terminus of then-proposed SH 77 in Naples. FM 2880 was cancelled on February 28, 1966, and transferred to SH 77.

== FM 2881 ==
Farm to Market Road 2881
- Location: Lamb and Hale counties
- Length: 10.262 mi (16.515 km)
- Existed: 1963–present

== FM 2882 ==
Farm to Market Road 2882
- Location: Titus County
- Length: 1.415 mi (2.277 km)
- Existed: 1963–present

== FM 2883 ==
Farm to Market Road 2883
- Location: Hale and Floyd counties
- Length: 14.35 mi (23.09 km)
- Existed: 1963–present

== FM 2884 ==
Farm to Market Road 2884
- Location: Childress County
- Length: 3.587 mi (5.773 km)
- Existed: June 4, 1964–present

Farm to Market Road 2884 (FM 2884) is located in Childress County.

FM 2884 begins at an intersection with FM 268 northeast of Childress. The highway runs north through unincorporated Childress County and turns northeast at County Road V. FM 2884 runs for approximately 3.6 miles before state maintenance ends and becomes County Road 19.

The current FM 2884 was designated on June 4, 1964, along the current route.

=== FM 2884 (1963) ===
Farm to Market Road 2884
- Location: Hockley County
- Existed: June 28, 1963–May 21, 1964

FM 2884 was first designated on June 28, 1963, beginning at FM 2306 near Levelland and going southward to SH 116 (now SH 114). The highway was cancelled on May 21, 1964, and combined with FM 1490.

== FM 2885 ==
Farm to Market Road 2885
- Location: Gaines County
- Length: 10.547 mi (16.974 km)
- Existed: 1963–present

== RM 2886 ==
Ranch to Market Road 2886
- Location: Terrell and Pecos counties
- Length: 41.667 mi (67.057 km)
- Existed: 1963–present

Ranch to Market Road 2886 (RM 2886) is located in Terrell and Pecos counties.

The southern terminus of RM 2886 is in Terrell County at RM 2400. The route travels north into Pecos County before ending at exit 298 on I-10, approximately 4.0 miles (6.4 km) east of Bakersfield.

RM 2886 was established on June 28, 1963, from its current northern terminus (then signed as US 290) southward 7.8 miles (12.6 km). The designation was extended south several times: 10.4 miles (16.7 km) on June 2, 1967; 3.0 miles (4.8 km) to an intersection with Harrel Road on July 11, 1968; 6.0 miles (9.7 km) on September 5, 1973; 3.4 miles (5.5 km) on October 21, 1981; 2.7 miles (4.3 km) on April 28, 1983; 6.3 miles (10.1 km) on April 30, 1987; and 5.6 miles (9.0 km) to its current southern terminus on October 29, 1992.

== FM 2887 ==
Farm to Market Road 2887
- Location: Runnels County
- Length: 7.8 mi (12.6 km)
- Existed: 1963–present

== FM 2888 ==
Farm to Market Road 2888
- Location: Cass County
- Length: 7.778 mi (12.517 km)
- Existed: 1963–present

== FM 2889 ==
Farm to Market Road 2889
- Location: Armstrong County
- Length: 4.056 mi (6.527 km)
- Existed: November 26, 1969–present

=== FM 2889 (1963) ===
Farm to Market Road 2889
- Location: Limestone County
- Existed: November 20, 1963–August 2, 1968

A previous route numbered FM 2889 was designated on November 20, 1963, from SH 7 near the Robertson County line north 1.9 miles (3.1 km) to the Magnet Cove Barium Corporation plant site. FM 2889 was cancelled on August 2, 1968, and became a portion of FM 2749.

== FM 2890 ==
Farm to Market Road 2890
- Location: Delta County
- Length: 1.546 mi (2.488 km)
- Existed: June 1, 1964–present

Farm to Market Road 2890 (FM 2890) is located in western and central Delta County. It is approximately 1.5 miles (2.4 km) in length and travels through mainly rural areas between the communities of West Delta and Klondike.

FM 2890 begins at SH 24 in the unincorporated community of West Delta. The route runs east and then bends to the northeast before entering the community of Klondike, where it ends at FM 1528.

The first road appeared in the location of FM 2890 between the years of 1936 and 1940. This road followed the approximate route of FM 2890, and had a graded and drained gravel surface. The road was approximately 1.6 miles (2.6 km) in length. By 1951, a small bridge had been constructed over a creek in Klondike, and the highway had been slightly straightened, at a length of 1.5 miles (2.4 km). By 1956 the road's surface had been improved to crushed stone. By 1964, the highway's surface had been improved to bituminous, a combination of crushed rock and asphalt. The route had also been minorly straightened. FM 2890 was designated on May 6, 1964, along its current route. The entire length of the highway was paved by 1987.

== FM 2891 ==
Farm to Market Road 2891
- Location: Parker County
- Length: 3.096 mi (4.983 km)
- Existed: May 25, 1976–present

=== FM 2891 (1964) ===
Farm to Market Road 2891
- Location: Wichita and Archer counties
- Existed: May 6, 1964–June 14, 1965

The first use of the FM 2891 designation was in Wichita and Archer counties, from FM 1180 south and southwest 2.2 miles (3.5 km) to a road intersection. FM 2891 was cancelled on June 14, 1965, and became a portion of FM 2846.

=== FM 2891 (1966) ===
Farm to Market Road 2891
- Location: Morris and Cass counties
- Existed: February 28, 1966–September 21, 1973

The next use of the FM 2891 designation was in Morris and Cass counties, from FM 1400 (now FM 130) near Daingerfield northeast 3.3 miles (5.3 km) to the Cass County line. On February 3, 1972, the road was extended east 1.8 miles (2.9 km) to FM 161. FM 2891 was cancelled on September 21, 1973, and became a portion of FM 130.

== FM 2892 ==
Farm to Market Road 2892
- Location: Henderson County
- Length: 2.052 mi (3.302 km)
- Existed: November 26, 1969–present

=== FM 2892 (1964) ===
Farm to Market Road 2892
- Location: Cameron County
- Existed: May 6, 1964–March 7, 1969

A previous route numbered FM 2892 was designated on May 6, 1964, from US 281 east of Los Indios south 1.5 miles (2.4 km) to proposed New International Bridge across the Rio Grande. FM 2892 was cancelled on March 7, 1969, and removed from the highway system; funds originally set aside for FM 2892 were used to construct FM 1561 instead.

== FM 2893 ==
Farm to Market Road 2893
- Location: Cameron County
- Length: 2.951 mi (4.749 km)
- Existed: 1964–present

== FM 2894 ==
Farm to Market Road 2894
- Location: Hidalgo County
- Existed: May 6, 1964–January 25, 2001

Farm to Market Road 2894 (FM 2894) was located in Hidalgo County. No highway currently uses the FM 2894 designation.

FM 2894 was designated on May 6, 1964, from FM 1924, 2.4 miles (3.9 km) west of SH 107, north 4.0 miles (6.4 km) to FM 2221. On January 25, 2001, FM 2894 was cancelled by district request and redesignated as SH 364.

== FM 2895 ==
Farm to Market Road 2895
- Location: Webb County
- Length: 17.443 mi (28.072 km)
- Existed: 1964–present

Farm to Market 2895 (FM 2895) is located in western Webb County.

FM 2895 begins at SH 359 in the unincorporated community of Aguilares. It runs northward through rural areas of Webb County before ending at US 59 (Future I-69W). The route has no major intersections between its termini and is two-laned for its entire length.

FM 2895 was designated on May 6, 1964, and it has always ended at SH 359 in Aguilares. Its original northern terminus was at a point approximately 7.0 miles (11.3 km) north of Aguilares. On May 5, 1966, it was extended to a total length of 13.1 miles (21.1 km). The route reached its current length on June 2, 1967, when it was extended to US 59.

== FM 2896 ==
Farm to Market Road 2896
- Location: Cooke County
- Length: 4.301 mi (6.922 km)
- Existed: 1964–present

== FM 2897 ==
Farm to Market Road 2897
- Location: Wilbarger County
- Length: 2.442 mi (3.930 km)
- Existed: 1964–present

== FM 2898 ==
Farm to Market Road 2898
- Location: Young County
- Length: 4.89 mi (7.87 km)
- Existed: 1964–present

== FM 2899 ==
Farm to Market Road 2899
- Location: Dallam County
- Length: 4.367 mi (7.028 km)
- Existed: 1964–present
