= Farm to Market Road 1528 =

Road in Texas

Farm to Market Road 1528
- FM 1528 highlighted in red

Route information
- Maintained by TxDOT
- Length: 11.415 mi (18.371 km)
- Existed: September 28, 1949–present

Major junctions
- West end: FM 64 in Antioch
- FM 2068 in Gough; SH 24 near Klondike; FM 2890 in Klondike; FM 1880 near Cooper
- East end: SH 154 / Bus. SH 24 in Cooper

Location
- Country: United States
- State: Texas
- Counties: Delta

Highway system
- Highways in Texas; Interstate; US; State; Former; Toll; Loops; Spurs; FM/RM; Park; Rec
← FM 1527	→ FM 1529

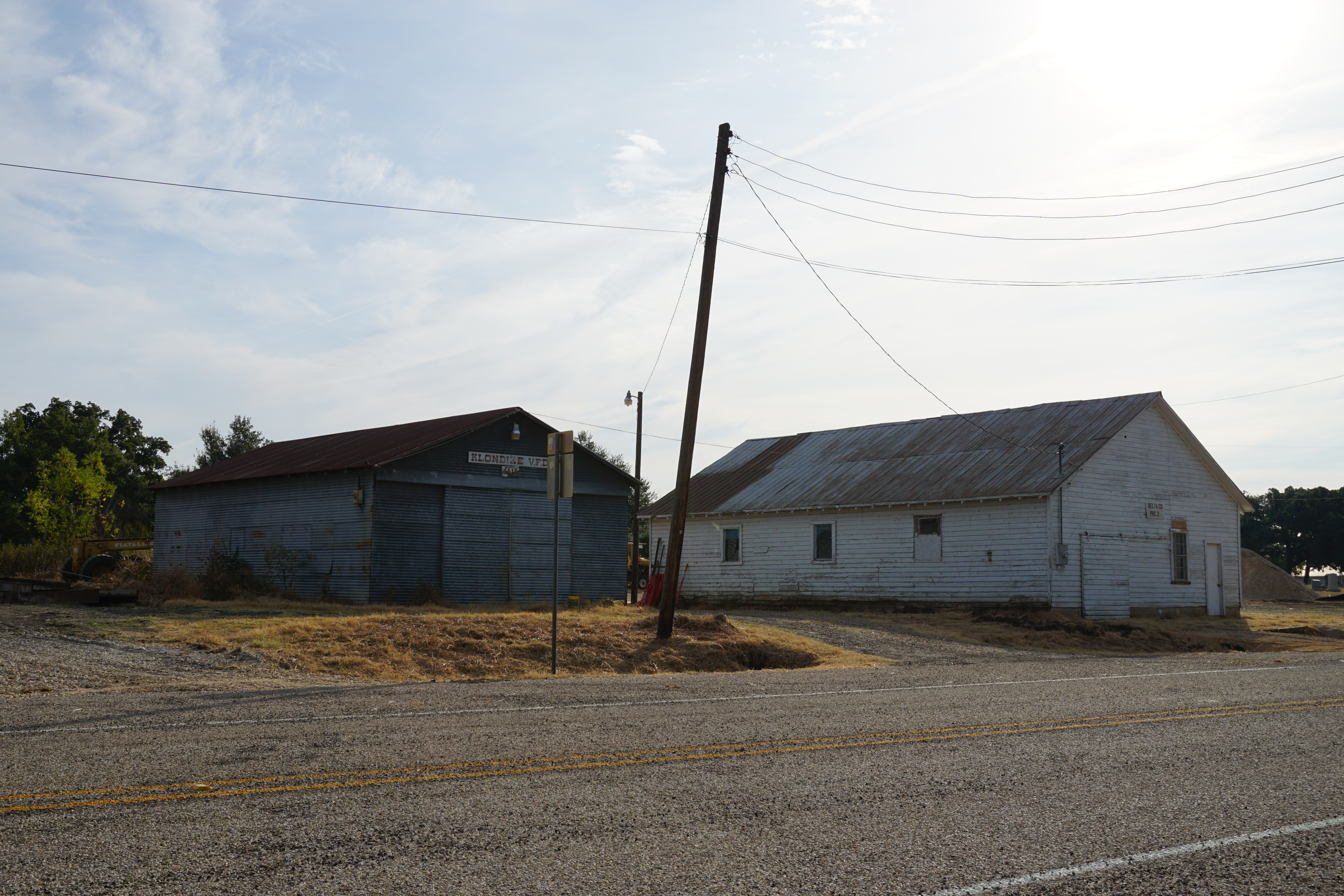
Farm to Market Road 1528 in Klondike

Farm to Market Road 1528 (FM 1528) is a farm-to-market road located in the western and central portions of Delta County in the U.S. state of Texas. The highway is approximately 11.4 miles (18.3 km) in length, and travels from FM 64 in the community of Antioch to SH 154 in the county seat of Cooper.

Early roads existed in the place of FM 1528 by 1936, and a short section of highway between SH 27 (now SH 24) and Klondike was designated as Loop 39 in 1939, and FM 1528 was designated in 1949. The route of the highway has been altered since its designation, including rerouting due to the construction of Cooper Lake.

== Route description ==
FM 1528 begins at an intersection with FM 64 in the unincorporated community of Antioch as a two-lane, paved road. The highway proceeds southward, entering rural areas and intersecting several small roads. The road continues, entering the former community of Gough and intersects FM 2068. FM 1528 turns due eastward and continues, exiting the Gough area. The roadway proceeds east, intersecting several county roads and traveling past several small houses. The highway bends southward and travels a short distance before it intersects SH 24. The highway runs concurrently with SH 24 for a short distance before splitting off, proceeding into the community of Klondike. The road turns northeast, after it proceeds through Klondike and intersects FM 2890. The roadway continues northeastward, passing through the Cooper Wildlife Management Area, as well as traveling over a creek leading to Cooper Lake before it reenters rural areas. It continues, passing over another creek before it bends eastward. At the southern edge of Cooper, the route intersects FM 1880. The road bends northward, entering the city of Cooper. The roadway passes several small buildings in the community before reaching its eastern terminus, an intersection with SH 154 and State Highway 24 Business.

== History ==
The first segments of road in the location of what would become FM 1528 existed by the year of 1936. On September 26, 1939, a portion of road traveling from SH 24 to the community of Klondike was designated as Spur Highway 39 (Spur 39). and on September 28, 1949, through the order of the Texas Transportation Board, FM 1528 was designated, and Spur 39 was redesignated as part of the highway. In 1961, the highway had a bituminous surface, a combination of gravel and asphalt. By 1987, the highway had been minorly rerouted and straightened, and the entire length had been paved. Between 1986 and 1991, the highway's route was minorly rerouted between Klondike and Cooper, due to the construction of Cooper Lake.

== Major intersections ==
The entire road is in Delta County.

Location	mi	km	Destinations	Notes
Antioch	0.000	0.000	FM 64	Western terminus
Gough	2.359	3.796	FM 2068	Eastern terminus of FM 2068
	4.741	7.630	SH 24 south – Commerce	West end of SH 24 concurrency
	4.945	7.958	SH 24 north – Cooper	East end of SH 24 concurrency
Klondike	5.604	9.019	FM 2890	Eastern terminus of FM 2890
Cooper	10.587	17.038	FM 1880 (SW 8th Street)	Northern terminus of FM 1880
Cooper	11.415	18.371	SH 154 / Bus. SH 24 (Dallas Avenue) — Sulphur Springs, Commerce, Paris	Eastern terminus
1.000 mi = 1.609 km; 1.000 km = 0.621 mi: Concurrency terminus
