= Ladonia, Texas =

Town in the United States

- Town
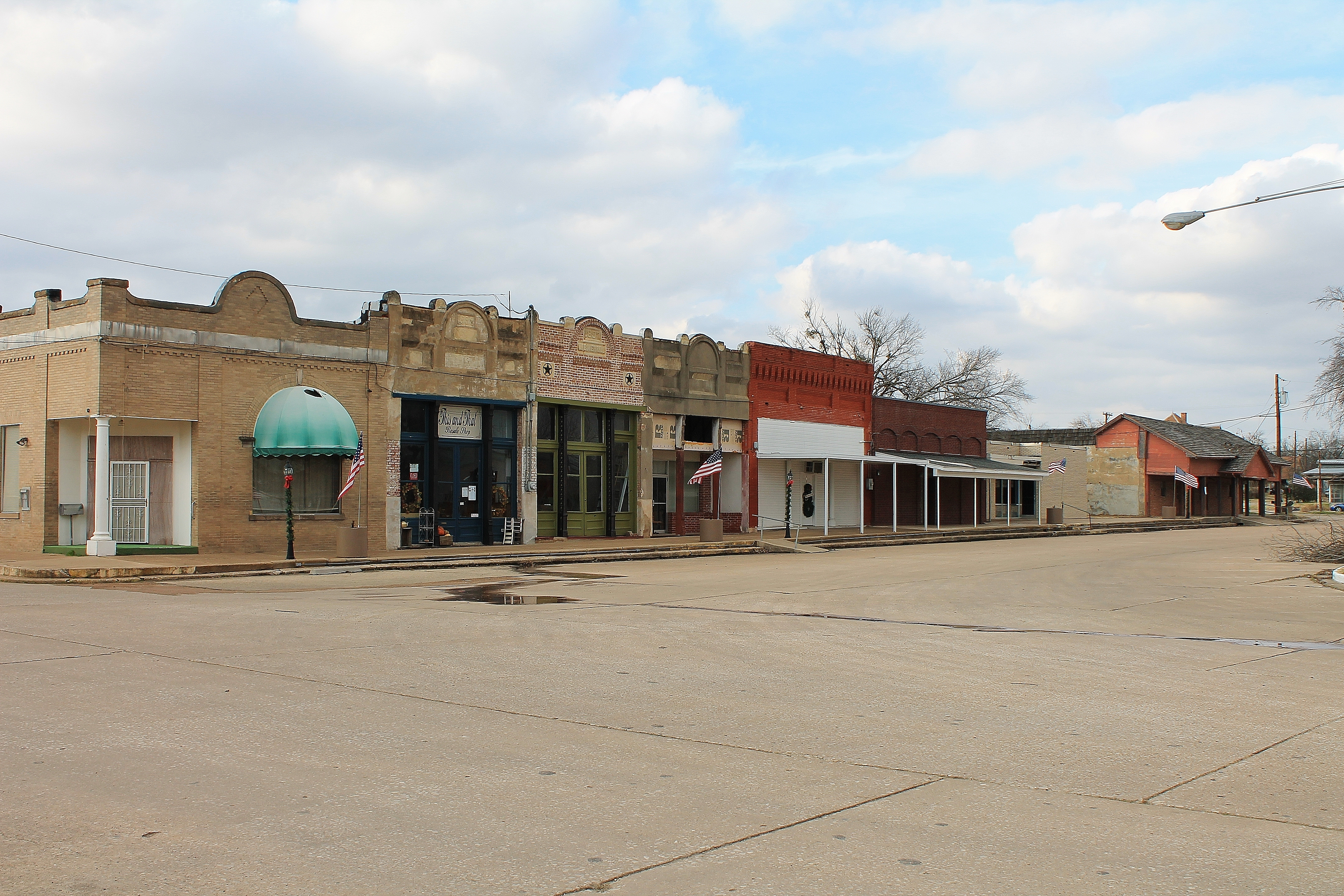

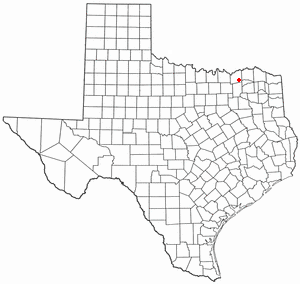
- Location of Ladonia, Texas

- Coordinates: 33°25′22″N 95°56′55″W
- Country: United States
- State: Texas
- County: Fannin

Area
  - Total: 1.99 sq mi (5.16 km^{2})
  - Land: 1.99 sq mi (5.16 km^{2})
  - Water: 0 sq mi (0.00 km^{2})
- Elevation: 643 ft (196 m)

Population (2020)
  - Total: 597
  - Density: 300/sq mi (116/km^{2})
- Time zone: UTC-6 (Central (CST))
  - Summer (DST): UTC-5 (CDT)
- ZIP code: 75449
- Area codes: 903, 430
- FIPS code: 48-40180
- GNIS feature ID: 2412858
- Website: www.cityofladonia.com

Ladonia is a town in Fannin County, Texas, United States. Its population was 597 at the 2020 census.

== History ==
The area was first settled around 1840. Originally called McCownville, its name was changed to Ladonia in 1857, supposedly in honor of A. T. Donitz. Its population grew late in the 19th century when the Gulf Colorado Santa Fe Railroad went through Ladonia, making it a shipping point for corn, cotton, and grain crops. Because of this, the population increased rapidly to 1,500 in the 1890s and peaked at over 2,000 by the turn of the 20th century. However, Ladonia suffered during the Great Depression. At a population of 1,199 thereafter, it never recovered, but continued to decrease in population, falling to 658 in 1990 and 612 in 2010.

== Geography ==
Ladonia is located in southeastern Fannin County. Texas State Highway 34 passes through the town, leading north 12 miles (19 km) to Honey Grove and southwest 10 miles (16 km) to Wolfe City. Texas State Highway 50 leads south from Ladonia 14 miles (23 km) to Commerce. Ladonia Fossil Park is located 2 miles (3 km) north of town on the North Sulphur River.

According to the United States Census Bureau, Ladonia has a total area of 2.0 square miles (5.2 km^{2}), all land.

== Demographics ==
Historical population
Census	Pop.	Note	%±
1870	516		—
1880	223		−56.8%
1890	765		243.0%
1900	1,409		84.2%
1910	1,293		−8.2%
1920	1,713		32.5%
1930	1,199		−30.0%
1940	1,279		6.7%
1950	1,104		−13.7%
1960	890		−19.4%
1970	757		−14.9%
1980	761		0.5%
1990	658		−13.5%
2000	667		1.4%
2010	612		−8.2%
2020	597		−2.5%
U.S. Decennial Census

=== 2020 census ===
Ladonia racial composition (NH = Non-Hispanic) (Note: Note: the US Census treats Hispanic/Latino as an ethnic category. This table excludes Latinos from the racial categories and assigns them to a separate category. Hispanics/Latinos can be of any race.)
Race	Number	Percentage
White (NH)	344	57.62%
Black or African American (NH)	183	30.65%
Native American or Alaska Native (NH)	12	2.01%
Asian (NH)	2	0.34%
Mixed/Multi-Racial (NH)	38	6.37%
Hispanic or Latino	18	3.02%
Total	597	

As of the 2020 United States census, there were 597 people, 304 households, and 219 families residing in the town.

=== 2000 census ===
As of the census of 2000, 667 people, 266 households, and 188 families were residing in the town. The population density was 363.5 inhabitants per square mile (140.3/km^{2}). The 316 housing units averaged 172.2 per square mile (66.7/km^{2}). The racial makeupof the town was 70.61% White, 25.34% African American, 0.75% Asian, 1.65% from other races, and 1.65% from two or more races. Hispanics or Latinos of any race were 2.55% of the population.

Of the 266 households, 28.9% had children under the age of 18 living with them, 44.7% were married couples living together, 20.7% had a female householder with no husband present, and 29.3% were not families. About 25.9% of all households were made up of individuals, and 14.3% had someone living alone who was 65 years of age or older. The average household size was 2.51, and the average family size was 2.97.

In the town, the population was distributed as 26.4% under the age of 18, 8.2% from 18 to 24, 24.4% from 25 to 44, 24.3% from 45 to 64, and 16.6% who were 65 years of age or older. The median age was 38 years. For every 100 females, there were 89.0 males. For every 100 females age 18 and over, there were 86.7 males.

The median income for a household in the town was $26,389, and for a family was $31,591. Males had a median income of $26,806 versus $19,615 for females. The per capita income for the town was $13,851. About 18.9% of families and 24.6% of the population were below the poverty line, including 34.3% of those under age 18 and 30.2% of those age 65 or over.

== Education ==
Ladonia is served by the Fannindel Independent School District.

== Parks and recreation ==
The Ladonia Fossil Park is often visited by avid fossil hunters and amateurs, with finds ranging from shark teeth to Mosasaur veterbrae. It was temporarily relocated in 2021 due to construction.

== Photo gallery ==
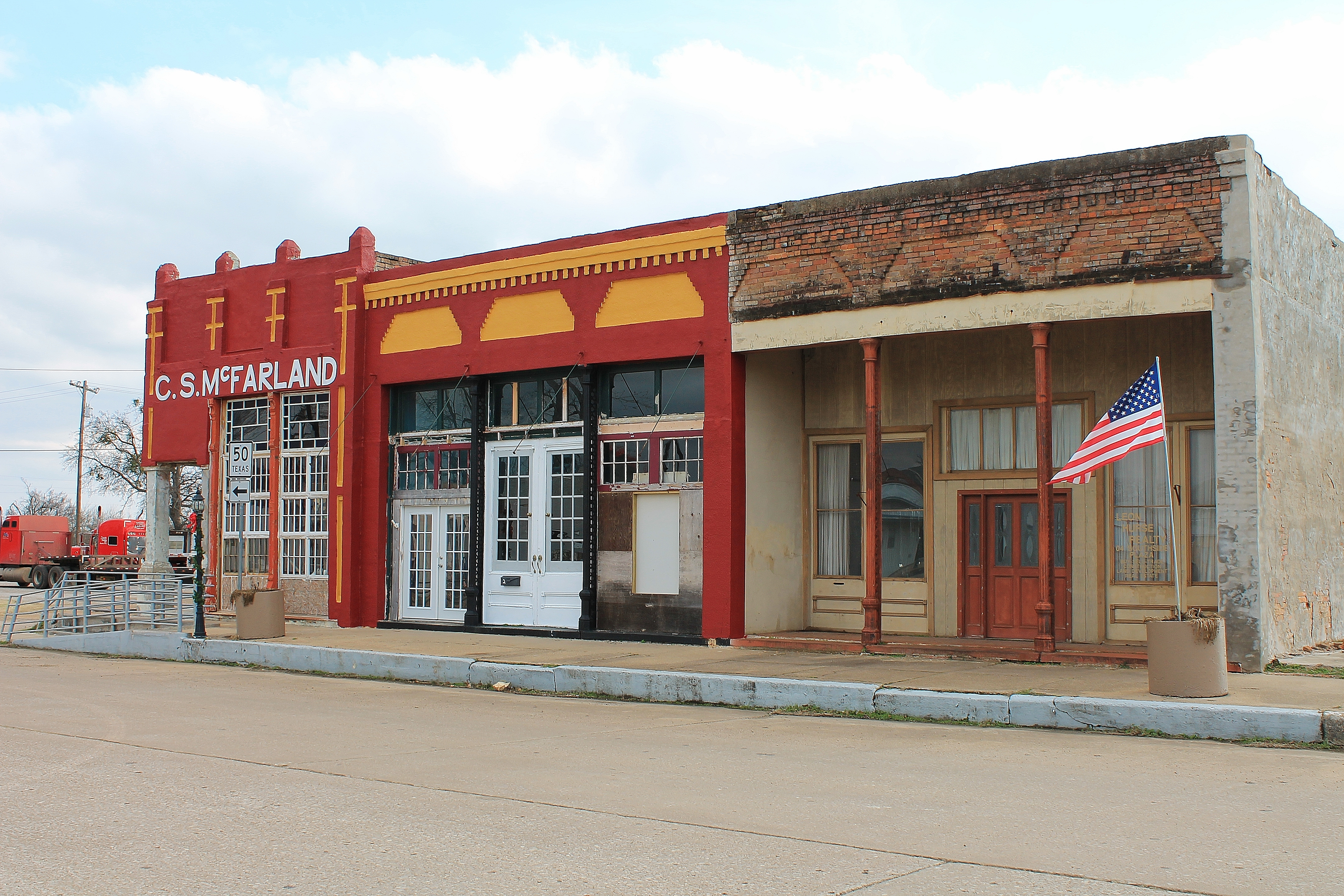
Downtown Ladonia

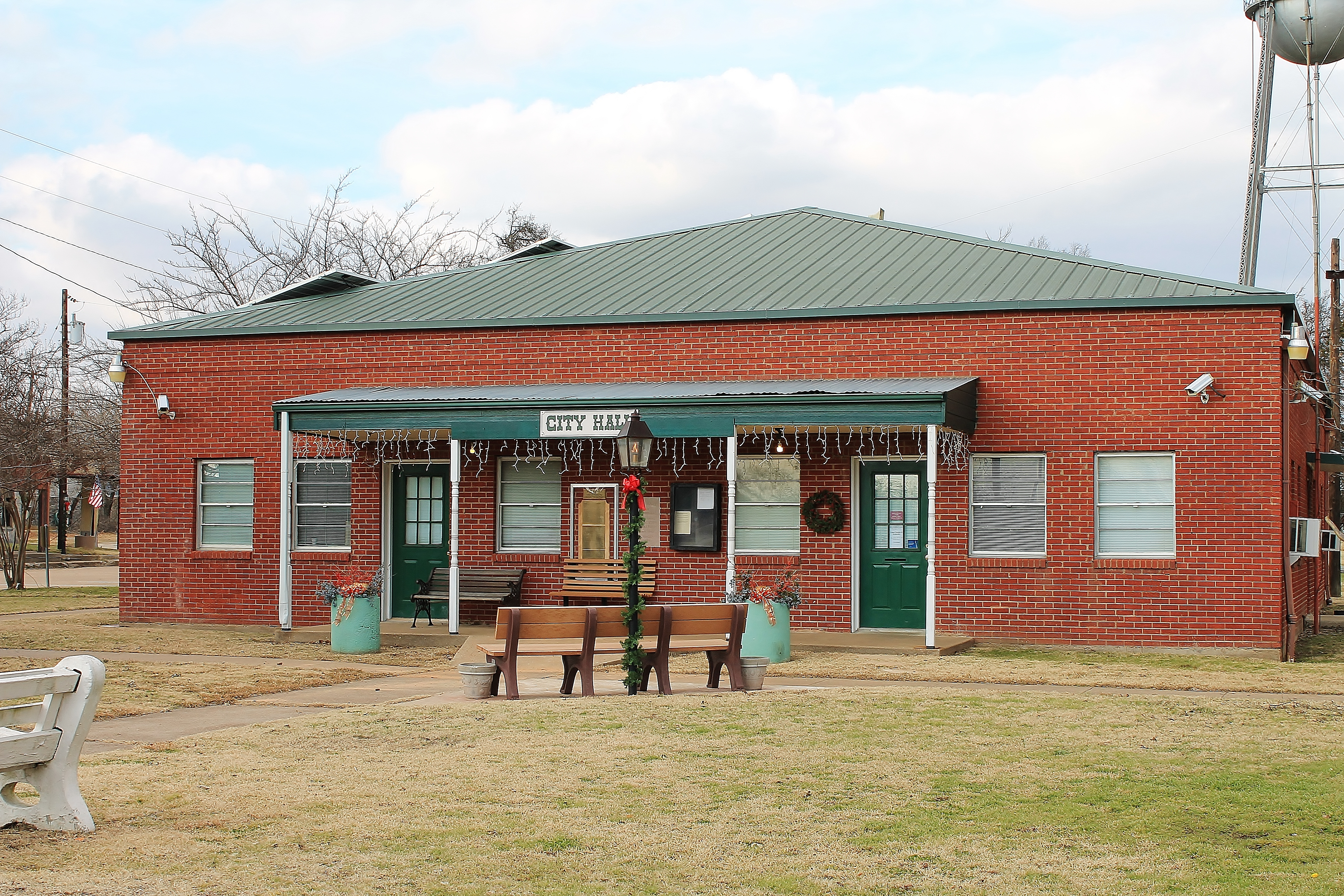
City Hall

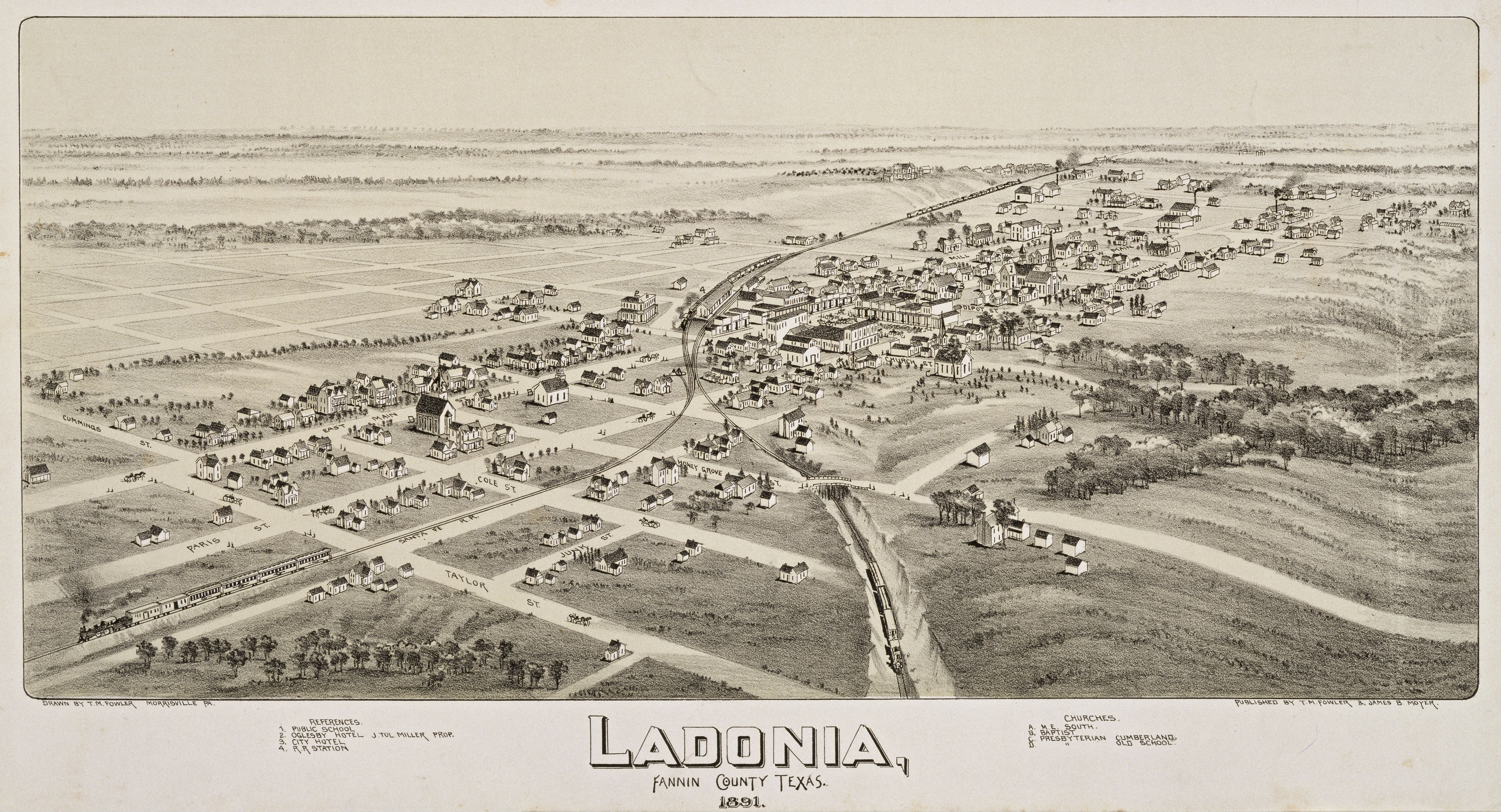
Map of the city 1891
