= Fannindel Independent School District =

School district in Texas

Coordinates: 33.4335°N 95.9395°W

Location
- Ladonia, Texas; United States

District information
- Type: Public
- Superintendent: Travis Waddell

Students and staff
- Enrollment: 180
- Athletic conference: UIL Class A
- District mascot: Falcons
- Colors: Black & Gold

Other information
- Website: www.fannindelisd.net

Fannindel Independent School District is a public school district based in Ladonia, Texas (USA). The district's mascot is the Falcon.

The district primarily serves the City of Pecan Gap and the City of Ladonia, as well as the surrounding area.

The district's name is a portmanteau of Fannin and Delta, the counties in which it is primarily located. The district also includes the northeast portion of Hunt County and a very small sliver of Lamar County.

The High School campus has an average enrollment of 80 students including 6th grade through 12th grade. As well as the Elementary school with an average of 100 enrolled students including Pre-K through 5th grade.

The District has had success in UIL competitions, including winning the 1989 Conference 1A Boys State Basketball Championship, and appearing at the 2005 Conference 1A State One-Act Play Competition.

== Academic achievement ==
In 2009, the school district was rated "academically acceptable" by the Texas Education Agency.

== Schools ==
- Fannindel High School (Ladonia; Grades 6–12)
- Fannindel Elementary School (Pecan Gap; Grades PK-5)

== Special programs ==
=== Athletics ===
Fannindel High School plays six-man football.

== See also ==
- List of school districts in Texas
