= Ed Robnett =

American football player (1920–1990)

No. 71
- Positions: Fullback, linebacker

Personal information
- Born: March 7, 1920; Klondike, Texas, U.S.
- Died: September 20, 1990 (aged 70); Lubbock, Texas, U.S.
- Listed height: 5 ft 8 in (1.73 m)
- Listed weight: 205 lb (93 kg)

Career information
- High school: Cooper (Cooper, Texas)
- College: Texas A&M; Texas Tech
- NFL draft: 1946: 18th round, 169th overall pick

Career history
- San Francisco 49ers (1947)

Awards and highlights
- National champion (1939)

Career AAFC statistics
- Rushing yards: 18
- Rushing average: 2.6
- Stats at Pro Football Reference

William Edward Robnett (March 7, 1920 – September 20, 1990) was an American football fullback in the All-America Football Conference (AAFC) for the San Francisco 49ers. He played college football at Agricultural and Mechanical College of Texas (now Texas A&M University) and Texas Technological College (now Texas Tech University) and was drafted in the eighteenth round of the 1946 NFL draft by the Washington Redskins.
