= Cooper Review =

Weekly newspaper serving community in Texas, US

- The Easter edition of the Cooper Review
- Type: Weekly newspaper
- Format: Broadsheet
- Owner: Ashley Colvin
- Publisher: Ashley Colvin
- Editor: Brenda Perez
- Founded: c. 1880 (as The Cooper Banner)
- Circulation: 577 (as of 2023)
- OCLC number: 14148322

The Cooper Review is an American weekly newspaper published in Cooper, Texas. It was founded around 1880 by the Hornebeck family as The Cooper Banner; however, through mergers, its history dates to 1873, when The Delta Courier was established. Since 2011, it has been a member of the Texas Press Association.

== History ==
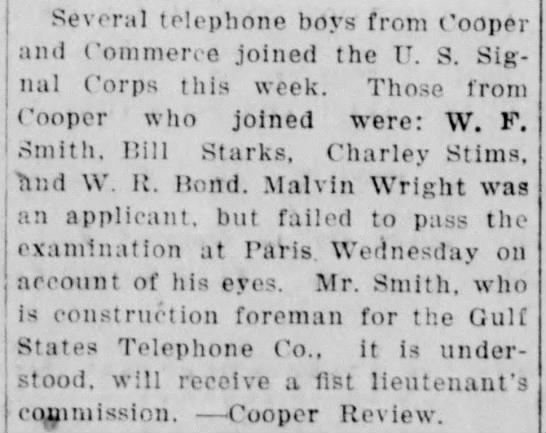
An article from the Cooper Review that was reprinted in The Paris Morning News in July 1917

The development of the modern version of the Cooper Review grew from the gradual incorporation of two older papers: The Cooper Banner, and The Delta Courier. The latter was the first newspaper established in Delta County, founded in Cooper in 1873 by Bob Michiel.

From its establishment, the Delta Courier quickly changed ownership twice before it was purchased by local doctor J.N. Boyd. He operated the newspaper until 1880, when it was sold to Clarksville citizens Mel and Frank Custer. Around 1880, a rival newspaper, The Cooper Banner, was founded by Mr. and Mrs. A.S. Hornebeck. The Hornebecks quickly sold the Banner to John Boyd, brother of former Delta Courier owner J.D. Boyd. The newspaper was renamed The Cooper Review, before it was sold again and the name was changed back to the Banner.

By 1896, a third newspaper, the People's Cause, was being produced in Cooper; however, circulation quickly ceased. In September 1904, the Jacksonville native Hart family purchased the Banner, and reverted the name back to the Review. W.D. Hart was an elected member of the Texas Press Association in 1908. W.D. Hart's two sons Lyndol E. Hart and Wren Harold Hart continued to run the Review until the end of 1951. Early in that period, the family bought the Delta Courier and merged the two papers. The Hart brothers sold The Cooper Review and purchased The Weatherford Democrat in Weatherford, Texas.

In 1952, the Review was purchased by J.T. Toney, who ran it until late 1976, when he sold it to Skipper Steely's Citizen Publishing Company. In 1978 it sold to the Harte-Hanks Communications. The company owned the newspaper through 1984. It switched ownership several times before being purchased by the Gregory family. It was sold by the Gregorys in 2006 to Jim and Sally Butler. As the first versions of what would become the Review were published around 1880, The Cooper Review is considered to be the oldest continuous business in Delta County, along with the former J.F. Henslee Hardware Store. The printing press purchased and used by the Hart family is now in the Cooper Historical Museum.

The newspaper was recently owned and published by the Butler family of Cooper, Jim and Sally Butler, and edited by Janis Thomas and Cindy Roller. Before the passing of owner Jim Butler in 2021, the Review transferred ownership to Karrie Harmon and her daughter Rhandi Allred. The family owned, operated and published the Cooper Review until March 6, 2023, when it was sold to Ashley Colvin.

== Publishing and circulation ==
The Cooper Review is published weekly, with editions being circulated every Thursday. The paper's publication facilities were once located at 50 East Side Square, Cooper, Texas 75432, but is currently in search of a new location. The newspaper is currently owned by Ashley Colvin. When it was under the ownership of the Butler family, after purchasing the paper, they hired Roger Palmer its publisher, editor, and advertising director. However, Jim Butler replaced Palmer as the publisher and advertising director. Cindy Roller, a former writer for the Sulphur Springs News-Telegram and current news reporter for the Texas A&M University–Commerce radio station KETR, was hired to replace Palmer as the paper's editor. It is currently published with page dimensions of 6 by 21 inches (150 by 530 mm), which is slightly shrunk down from the former dimensions of 6 by 21.5 inches (150 by 550 mm), which were used through 2011. In 2011, it had a weekly circulation of 1,429 editions, which had declined by 2013, when the circulation was only 1,228 editions weekly. Since 2011, the newspaper has been a member of the Texas Press Association, an organization which provides assistance to newspapers across the state.

== Awards ==
In 2012, Cindy Roller was named to the Texas Association of School Boards’ Media Honor Roll, for her efforts in "reporting school news in a manner that is fair, accurate, and balanced", as well as sharing all information with schools. The Cooper Independent School District requested that Roller was named to the Honor Roll. In 2013, the Texas Press Association awarded The Cooper Review five times in its "2013 Better Newspaper Contest". The paper received commendations in community service reporting, editorial, sports, feature reporting, and page design. The Review received one first place award, an award for second place, two third place awards, and one fourth place prize.
