= Kensing, Texas =

- Unincorporated community
- Location within Texas Location within the United States
- Coordinates: 33°24′21″N 95°25′54″W
- Country: United States
- State: Texas
- County: Delta
- Elevation: 397 ft (121 m)
- Time zone: UTC-6 (Central (CST))
  - Summer (DST): UTC-5 (CDT)
- Area codes: 903 & 430
- GNIS feature ID: 1380025

Kensing is an unincorporated community in Delta County, Texas, United States. According to the Handbook of Texas, the community had a population of 35 in 2000.

== History ==
Kensing today was founded in the early 1900s around the Dee Flanniken sawmill. Its name is a portmanteau of the surnames of two local families, Flanniken and Sansing. The population was 35 as of 2000.

== Geography ==
Kensing is located on Farm to Market Road 895 in a richly wooded delta on the Sulphur River, 6 mi (9.7 km) east of Charleston in extreme-eastern Delta County.

== Education ==
Kensing's first school was founded in 1902 and was on the 1936 county highway map. It remained open in 1951, then closed in 1963. Since 1970, Kensing has been served by the Cooper Independent School District.
