= Liberty Grove, Delta County, Texas =

Liberty Grove, Texas
- Former community
- Location within Texas Location within the United States
- Coordinates: 33°19′52″N 95°41′50″W
- Country: United States
- State: Texas
- County: Delta
- Elevation: 449 ft (137 m)
- Time zone: UTC-6 (Central (CST))
  - Summer (DST): UTC-5 (CDT)
- GNIS feature ID: 1380083

Liberty Grove is a ghost town in Delta County, Texas, United States. The community was settled by 1854, the year its school opened. The farming community included the school and a cemetery as of 1936. In 1966, the community had about 25 residents. The community's cemetery was relocated in 1989, and the community was subsequently abandoned and flooded by Cooper Lake. A campsite in Cooper State Park bears the community's name.
