= East Delta, Texas =

- Unincorporated community
- Location within Texas Location within the United States
- Coordinates: 33°23′36″N 95°30′47″W
- Country: United States
- State: Texas
- County: Delta
- Elevation: 436 ft (133 m)
- Time zone: UTC-6 (Central (CST))
  - Summer (DST): UTC-5 (CDT)
- Area codes: 903 & 430
- GNIS feature ID: 1379692

East Delta is an unincorporated community in Delta County, Texas, United States. According to the Handbook of Texas, the community had a population of 50 in 2000.

== History ==
The East Delta area was founded in 1939. In 1964, there were two cemeteries and a church in East Delta. Its population was 50 from 1990 through 2000.

== Geography ==
East Delta is located on Farm to Market Road 895, 1 mi (1.6 km) northeast of Charleston in eastern Delta County.

== Education ==
East Delta's school district was established in 1939. It came to fruition when the schools in Charleston, Vasco, Cleveland, and Long Ridge combined into one. The school closed its doors in 1964. Since 1970, East Delta has been served by the Cooper Independent School District.
