= Jim Chapman Dam =

Coordinates: 33°20′18″N 95°38′06″W

- Interactive map of Jim Chapman Dam
- Country: United States
- Location: Texas
- Status: Operational
- Opening date: 1991
- Designed by: United States Army Corps of Engineers

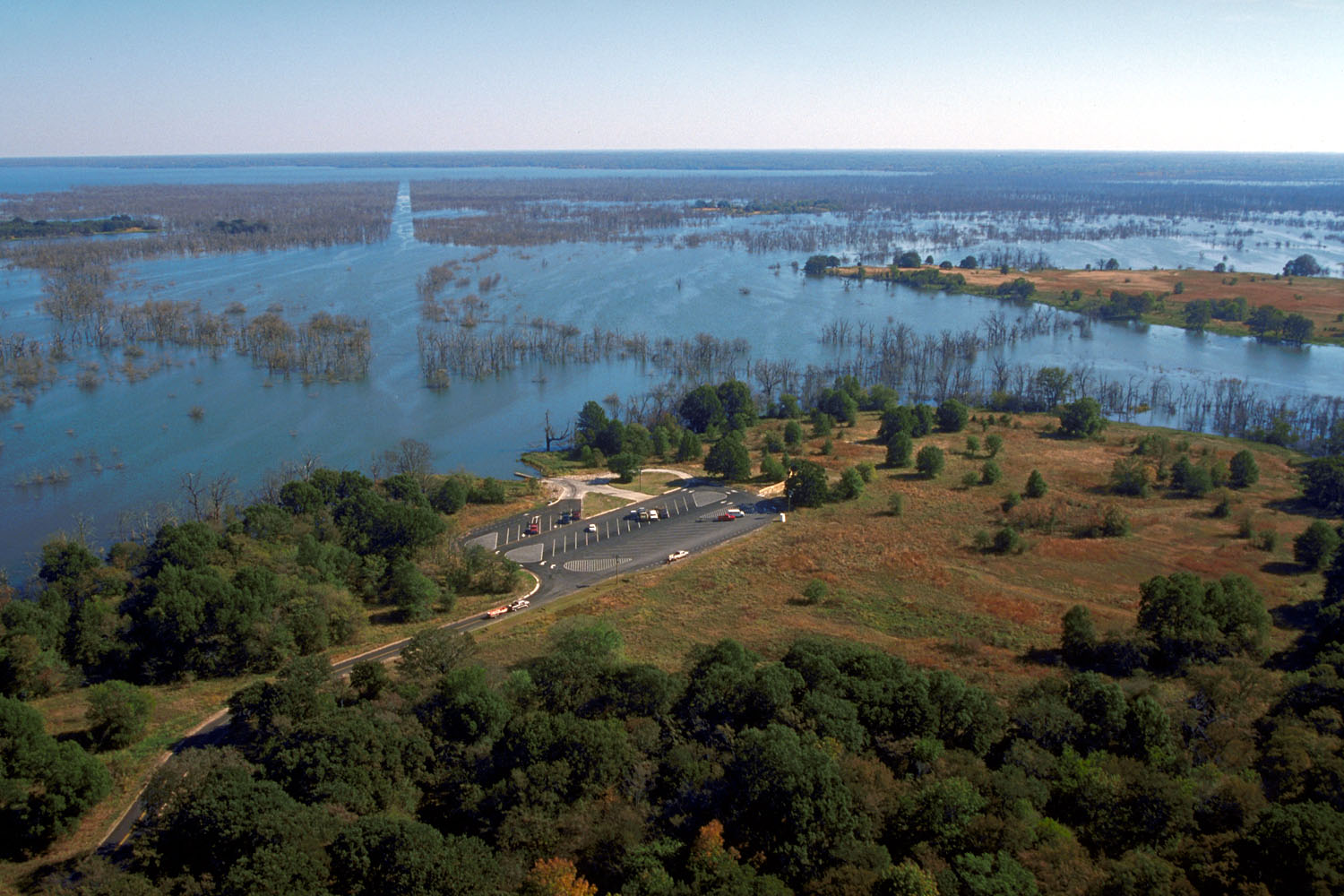
Cooper Dam and Jim Chapman Lake

Jim Chapman Dam (originally Cooper Dam, National ID # TX08012) is a dam in Delta County and Hopkins County, Texas, United States.

The earthen dam was constructed in 1991 by the Southwestern Division of the United States Army Corps of Engineers with a height of 95 feet, and a length of 28,072 feet at its crest. It impounds the south fork of the Sulphur River for municipal water supply and recreation. The dam is owned and operated by the Corps of Engineers.

The reservoir it creates, Jim Chapman Lake, has a 19,305-acre (7,812 ha) water surface and a maximum capacity of 797,000 acre-feet (983,000,000 m^{3}). The lake is known as a preferred location for fishing in the region. Species likely to be caught are blue and channel catfish, bluegill, Florida largemouth bass, crappie and hybrid striped bass. The Texas Parks and Wildlife Department's two separate units of Cooper State Park are located on Jim Chapman Lake.

The Dam was formerly known as Cooper Dam. Both lake and dam were renamed by an act of Congress in 1998 to honor Jim Chapman, a former congressman from nearby Sulphur Springs.
