= Cooper High School (Cooper, Texas) =

Location
- 440 SW 3rd Street; Cooper, Texas 75432-2519; United States; 33.361604°N 95.699703°W

Information
- School type: Public high school
- School district: Cooper Independent School District
- Principal: Rhyannon Page
- Staff: 32.49 (FTE)
- Grades: 9-12
- Enrollment: 227 (2023–2024)
- Student to teacher ratio: 6.99
- Colors: Maroon & Gray
- Athletics conference: UIL Class 2A
- Mascot: Bulldog
- Website: Cooper High School

Cooper High School is a public high school located in Cooper, Texas (USA) and classified as a 2A school by the UIL. It is part of the Cooper Independent School District located in central Delta County. In 2016, the school was rated "Met Standard" by the Texas Education Agency.

== Athletics ==
The Cooper Bulldogs compete in the following sports

- Baseball
- Basketball
- Cross Country
- Football
- Golf
- Powerlifting
- Softball
- Tennis
- Track and Field

=== State titles ===
- Baseball
  - 1999(2A)
- Girls Basketball
  - 1958(1A), 1960(1A), 1977(1A)
- Boys Golf
  - 1985(2A)
- One Act Play
  - 1988(2A)

== Notable alumni ==
- Bam Morris, former professional football player
