= Crossroads, Delta County, Texas =

- Unincorporated community
- Location within Texas Location within the United States
- Coordinates: 33°26′44″N 95°42′19″W
- Country: United States
- State: Texas
- County: Delta
- Elevation: 512 ft (156 m)
- Time zone: UTC-6 (Central (CST))
  - Summer (DST): UTC-5 (CDT)
- Area codes: 903 & 430
- GNIS feature ID: 1379613

Crossroads is an unincorporated community in Delta County, Texas, United States. According to the Handbook of Texas, the community had a population of 10 in 2000.

== Education ==
The large Hog Wallow School opened in 1895 and was renamed The Crossroads School. Since 1960, Crossroads has been served by the Cooper Independent School District.
