= Pacio, Texas =

- Unincorporated community
- Location within Texas Location within the United States
- Coordinates: 33°25′54″N 95°32′25″W
- Country: United States
- State: Texas
- County: Delta
- Elevation: 436 ft (133 m)
- Time zone: UTC-6 (Central (CST))
  - Summer (DST): UTC-5 (CDT)
- Area codes: 903 & 430
- GNIS feature ID: 1380320

Pacio is an unincorporated community in Delta County, Texas, United States. According to the Handbook of Texas, the community had a population of 15 in 2000.

== Geography ==
Pacio is located on Farm to Market Road 198 just south of the Old River Channel and north of Lake Creek, 3 mi (4.8 km) north of Charleston in northwestern Delta County.
