= Amy, Texas =

Ghost town in Texas, US

Amy is a ghost town in Delta County, Texas, United States. Situated on the A. Askey survey, it was settled in the early 1800s. A post office operated from 1894 to 1905; it was named Amy, because the United States Postal Service rejected 'Hobbs'. At its peak in 1939, it had a population of 25, which it maintained to 1952, but the community was abandoned by 1964.
