= Needmore, Delta County, Texas =

Ghost town in Texas, US

Needmore
- Ghost town
- Location in Texas
- Coordinates: 33.3237214°N 95.8396859°W
- Country: United States
- State: Texas
- County: Delta
- Elevation: 515 ft (157 m)

Needmore is a ghost town in Delta County, Texas, United States.

== History ==
Needmore is situated on Farm to Market Road 3132, and between Jernigan and Barnett Creek. It was established in the Republic of Texas. A post office operated from 1873 to 1907, and was called Pecan—for the tree. John W. Pratt served as first postmaster, and was replaced by J. M. Logsdon by 1892. It was renamed to Needmore in 1886. The town began declining after it was bypassed by the Texas Midland Railroad in 1895, and was abandoned by the 1980s.

According to the Texas Almanac, children from Needmore's school later attended classes at nearby Cooper ISD. Although Needmore still appeared on maps in 1984, no statistics are listed.
