= Plunk Lake (Texas) =

- Location within Texas Location within the United States
- Location: Smith County and Van Zandt County, Texas
- Coordinates: 32°38′42″N 95°35′37″W
- Type: reservoir
- Surface elevation: 377 ft (115 m)

Plunk Lake is a reservoir in Van Zandt and Smith counties, in northeast Texas, United States.
