= Cooper, Texas =

- City
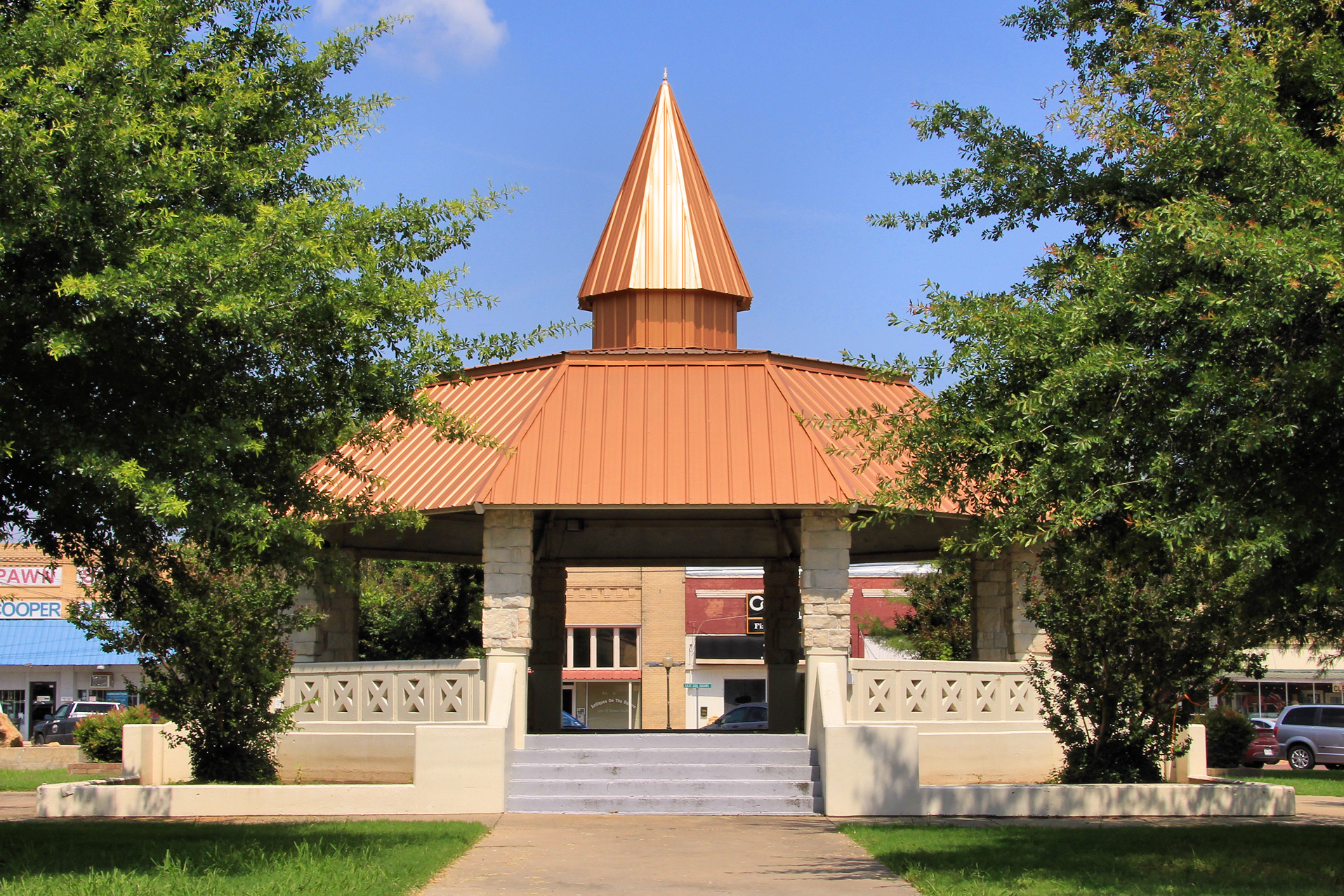
- The gazebo on the square in downtown Cooper

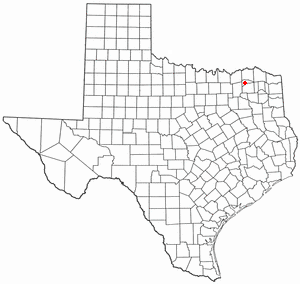
- Location of Cooper, Texas

- Coordinates: 33°22′27″N 95°41′24″W
- Country: United States
- State: Texas
- County: Delta
- Founded: 1870
- Named for: Leroy Cooper

Area
  - Total: 1.47 sq mi (3.80 km^{2})
  - Land: 1.46 sq mi (3.79 km^{2})
  - Water: 0.0039 sq mi (0.01 km^{2})
- Elevation: 482 ft (147 m)

Population (2020)
  - Total: 1,911
  - Density: 1,310/sq mi (504/km^{2})
- Time zone: UTC-6 (Central (CST))
  - Summer (DST): UTC-5 (CDT)
- ZIP code: 75432
- Area codes: 903, 430
- FIPS code: 48-16564
- GNIS feature ID: 2410222
- Website: Official website

Cooper is a city in and the county seat of Delta County, Texas, United States. Located between the north and south forks of the Sulphur River, Cooper is the largest settlement in Delta County. At the 2020 United States census, the city had a population of 1,911.

First inhabited by native people, Cooper was founded around 1870, at the same time that Delta County was established. Cooper grew rapidly and quickly became the center of local events. The city's economy relied primarily on agriculture and the shipping of local goods. In the mid-1890s, a railroad line was built through the city, assisting in Cooper's growth. The city continued to grow through the 1910s, and into the early 1920s. In 1926, however, the region's cotton crop failed, devastating the local economy. Many businesses were forced to close, including the railroad, and the city's population declined. Although Cooper began to recover during the mid-1930s, many people who left did not return, and the city never fully recovered. The local economy continued to rely on the growing of cotton as the main economy into the 1960s, until it began to shift to wheat growing in the early 1970s. The population of Cooper has been on a slow decline since the 1970s.

Cooper has no sites listed on the National Register of Historic Places. The city's economy still relies largely on agriculture. Cooper is located on the eastern edge of the Dallas–Fort Worth metroplex (DFW metroplex), a large, 12-county metropolitan area, one of the most populated in the country.

== History ==
=== Before establishment ===
The first inhabitants of the area that is now the site of Cooper were the Caddo Indians, who settled large portions of eastern Texas as early as 800 CE. The Caddo were highly advanced, living in large wooden structures, and were skilled farmers. The first European to visit the area was French explorer François Hervey, who discovered the area around 1750. However, a few decades later, some of the Indians caught European diseases and along with attacks from neighboring Indian tribes, forced the Caddo out of the area around Cooper. Around 1820, Delaware, Quapaw, and Seminole tribes settled in the area. In 1836, the Republic of Texas officially recognized the region around Cooper as part of Red River County. In 1840, Lamar County was formed, absorbing the Cooper area. However, just six years later, the region was designated as part of the newly formed Hopkins County.

After the Civil War, the region around the site of Cooper began to grow and develop. People in nearby Ben Franklin, Texas, grew tired of the poor road conditions that connected the region. In 1868, people in the area petitioned the state government to create a new county located between the north and south forks of the Sulphur River. On July 29, 1870, after two years of debating, the state of Texas granted the request for the new county. Shortly afterwards, the first settlements were built in Cooper and the town was established. The community was named after Leroy Cooper, the chairman of the Texas House Committee on Counties and Boundaries, who helped establish the new county. Cooper was selected as the seat for the county, which was named Delta County due to its triangular shape.

=== Since establishment ===
Cooper grew rapidly after being established, with a post office built in the community in 1871. Cooper was incorporated into a town in 1881 and held its first government elections. That same year, Cooper constructed the county courthouse. The town became the main market center for Delta County, and by 1885, Cooper had a population around 300. The Texas Midland Railroad, which ran through Cooper, was chartered in 1892. The railroad helped promote the rapid growth of the town. By 1896, Cooper's population had passed 1,000 people, and contained two churches, a school, and 21 businesses, including a bank and a hotel. The town also had two weekly newspapers. Cooper continued to grow into the early 1900s, especially in the area of agriculture. From the early 1890s to around 1910, farms boomed both in number and in value, with the number of cash crops nearly tripling. The region produced over 70,000 chickens and almost 7,000 pigs yearly.

Cooper continued to grow into the 1920s. The bank had been rebuilt in 1909, and the region's crops continued to prosper. Cooper reported its largest population, 2,563, in 1925. Delta County was hit by the Great Depression early, though. In late 1926, the community's cotton crop failed, forcing many residents to withdraw their savings. The bank was forced to close in 1927, and by the time it reopened a few months later, the region's economy had plummeted. Several families moved away from Cooper during the early 1930s, and in 1933, the bank was forced to close again. The Midland Texas Railroad failed, hurting Cooper's economy further. The New Deal program offered government-financed construction projects in Cooper, and in 1940, the Works Progress Administration demolished the former courthouse in Cooper and replaced it with a new one at a cost of $110,450 (equivalent to $2,538,300 respectively in 2022). However, even with the stability of the economy, Cooper's population remained low until the 1950s, when it returned to about 2,350 people. The population declined again in the 1980s, and has continued to slowly decline. Cooper had roughly 60 businesses in the 1970s and 1980s, and in 1986, work on Cooper Lake had begun. Filling of the lake began in September 1991, and by the next year, the lake was open for recreation. At that time, Cooper reported having 70 businesses, and a population around 2,200. By 2000, the population had dropped by about 50 people and an estimate for 2016 is 1,957 inhabitants.

== Geography ==
Cooper is the county seat of Delta County, as well as its most populated city. According to statistics from the United States Census Bureau, the city has a total area of 1.5 sq mi (3.9 km^{2}), of which 1.4 sq mi (3.6 km^{2}) (99.31%) is land. About 0.1 sq mi (0.26 km^{2}) (0.69%) is covered by water.

Cooper is located at an elevation of 482 ft (147 m), a few miles north of Cooper Lake, between the north and south forks of the Sulphur River. It is located about 76 miles (122 km) northeast of Dallas and 94 miles (151 km) west of Texarkana. Texas State Highway 24 bypasses Cooper to the north; however, Texas State Highway 24 Business splits off and passes through the center of the city. Texas State Highway 154 begins at the western edge of Cooper and passes through the center of the city, intersecting Farm to Market Road 1528 near the county courthouse. Farm to Market Road 64 enters the very western portion of Cooper before terminating at State Highway 24. Nearby highways include Farm to Market Road 1880 and Farm to Market Road 1529.

Cooper, as well as most of Delta County, is located in the Texas Blackland Prairies region, a flat, tall-grass prairie ecosystem that covers a large portion of north-central Texas. The region's elevation rarely differs from around 400 to 500 ft (120 to 150 m). The area's geology consists mainly of deep clay, or clay mixed with a dark-colored loam. However, the county is also known to have high-quality topsoil, ideal for crop growing.

=== Climate ===
Under the Köppen climate classification, Cooper is in zone Cfa with warm, wet summers and a humid subtropical climate. The average temperature in Cooper in January is 43 °F (6 °C), and in July it is 92 °F (33 °C). Its highest recorded temperature was 115 °F (46 °C) in 1969, and the lowest recorded temperature was −4 °F (−20 °C) in 1989. The average wettest month is October. The average coolest month is January, while the average hottest month is August.

Climate data for Cooper, Texas
Month	Jan	Feb	Mar	Apr	May	Jun	Jul	Aug	Sep	Oct	Nov	Dec	Year
Record high °F (°C)	85 (29)	91 (33)	91 (33)	93 (34)	99 (37)	107 (42)	111 (44)	115 (46)	112 (44)	100 (38)	89 (32)	85 (29)	115 (46)
Mean daily maximum °F (°C)	53 (12)	57 (14)	65 (18)	73 (23)	80 (27)	87 (31)	92 (33)	93 (34)	86 (30)	75 (24)	64 (18)	54 (12)	73 (23)
Mean daily minimum °F (°C)	33 (1)	37 (3)	44 (7)	52 (11)	61 (16)	69 (21)	73 (23)	72 (22)	64 (18)	53 (12)	44 (7)	34 (1)	53 (12)
Record low °F (°C)	0 (−18)	−1 (−18)	11 (−12)	27 (−3)	36 (2)	48 (9)	53 (12)	49 (9)	39 (4)	23 (−5)	14 (−10)	−4 (−20)	−4 (−20)
Average precipitation inches (mm)	3.0 (76)	3.8 (97)	4.4 (110)	3.8 (97)	4.8 (120)	4.4 (110)	3.4 (86)	2.4 (61)	3.0 (76)	5.4 (140)	4.5 (110)	4.3 (110)	47.2 (1,193)

== Demographics ==
Historical population
Census	Pop.	Note	%±
1880	294		—
1890	629		113.9%
1900	1,518		141.3%
1910	1,513		−0.3%
1920	2,563		69.4%
1930	2,023		−21.1%
1940	2,537		25.4%
1950	2,350		−7.4%
1960	2,213		−5.8%
1970	2,258		2.0%
1980	2,338		3.5%
1990	2,153		−7.9%
2000	2,150		−0.1%
2010	1,969		−8.4%
2020	1,911		−2.9%

=== 2020 census ===
As of the 2020 census, Cooper had a population of 1,911, down from the 1,969 reported in 2010. The median age was 39.5 years. 25.0% of residents were under the age of 18 and 21.2% of residents were 65 years of age or older. For every 100 females there were 87.7 males, and for every 100 females age 18 and over there were 85.4 males age 18 and over.

0% of residents lived in urban areas, while 100.0% lived in rural areas.

There were 756 households in Cooper, of which 33.5% had children under the age of 18 living in them. Of all households, 37.2% were married-couple households, 19.0% were households with a male householder and no spouse or partner present, and 37.0% were households with a female householder and no spouse or partner present. About 32.4% of all households were made up of individuals and 16.5% had someone living alone who was 65 years of age or older.

There were 867 housing units, of which 12.8% were vacant. Among occupied housing units, 56.2% were owner-occupied and 43.8% were renter-occupied. The homeowner vacancy rate was 2.2% and the rental vacancy rate was 9.7%.

Racial composition as of the 2020 census
Race	Number	Percent
White	1,460	76.4%
Black or African American	253	13.2%
American Indian and Alaska Native	11	0.6%
Asian	23	1.2%
Native Hawaiian and Other Pacific Islander	4	0.2%
Some other race	54	2.8%
Two or more races	106	5.5%
Hispanic or Latino (of any race)	160	8.4%

=== Religion ===
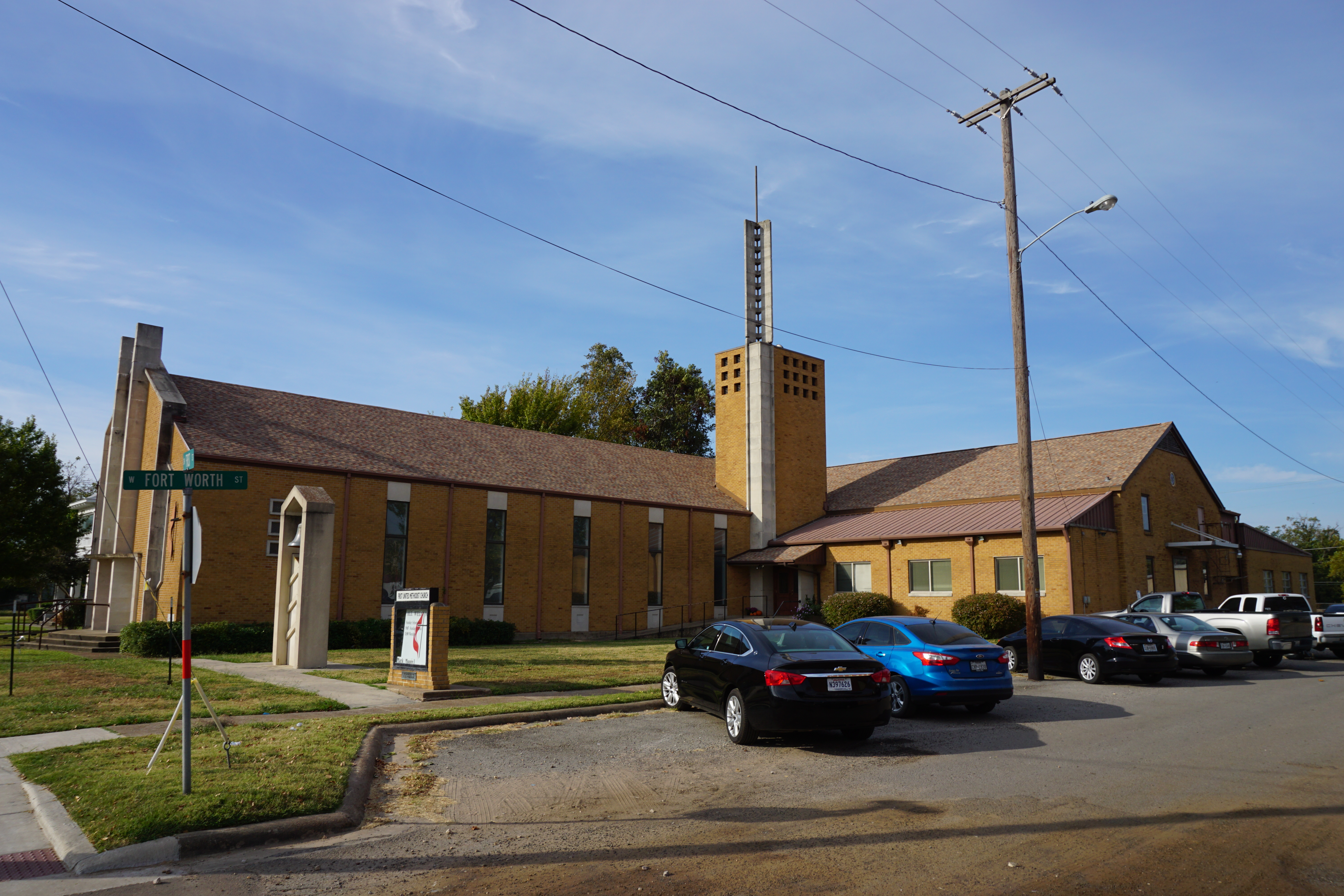
First United Methodist Church in Cooper

The first religious establishment in the region was erected by pioneers from Tennessee in 1847. By 1860, two Methodist Episcopal churches had been built nearby. In 1880, seven churches, which were predominantly Methodist, had been established in Delta County. In 1889, seven Baptist churches that had been established in the region held a meeting as the Delta County Baptist Association. During the early 1980s, 17 churches were in Delta County, two of which were located in Cooper. In 1931, 13 Baptist churches were located in and around Cooper. During the mid-1960s, 32 churches were in the region, representing seven Christian denominations. However, by 1982, five of those churches had closed.

Currently, 18 churches are located within the city limits of Cooper. These include congregations of the United Methodist Church and the Seventh-day Adventist Church, as well as those of Baptist, Catholic, Pentecostal, Methodist Episcopal and other denominations of Christianity. Six of the churches are of Baptist denomination and three are Methodist.

=== 2010 census ===
At the 2010 U.S. census, the population of Cooper was 1,969. 500 families were residing in 771 households spread across 897 housing units across the city. The total showed an increase of 56.6% from 2000.

In 2010, the racial make-up of the town was 77.2% White, 14.8% African American, 1.2% Native American, 1.1% Asian and 2.8% from other races. Hispanics or Latinos of any race were 6.1% of the population.

In 2010, of the 771 households, 27.9% had children under the age of 18 living with them, 64.9% were married couples living together, 19.1% had a female householder with no husband present and 35.1% were not families. Of all households, 31.5% were made up of individuals and 15.5% had someone living alone who was 65 years of age or older. The average household size was 2.46 and the average family size was 3.09.

The age distribution was 25.9% under 18, 9.3% from 18 to 24, 20.5% from 25 to 44, 24.6% from 45 to 64 and 19.7% who were 65 or older. The median age was 40.2 years. The median household income was $27,531, and the median family income was $29,853.

During the 2010 census, residents self-identified with a variety of ethnic ancestries; the major categories reflecting the settlers of the early to mid-19th century. People of American descent make up 21% of the population of the city, followed by Irish at 15.2%, English at 7.2%, German at 4.3%, Russian at 2.5%, French at 2.4%, Scottish at 1.5%, French−Canadian at 0.7%, Dutch at 0.5%, Norwegian at 0.5%, Slavic at 0.5%, Palestinian at 0.4%, Austrian at 0.3%, Welsh at 0.3%, Polish at 0.2%, and Italian rounding out at 0.2%. A total of 818 persons were of "other ancestries".

=== 2000 census ===
In 2000, employed males had a median income of $25,592 and females $17,500. The per capita income was $13,815.

== Economy ==
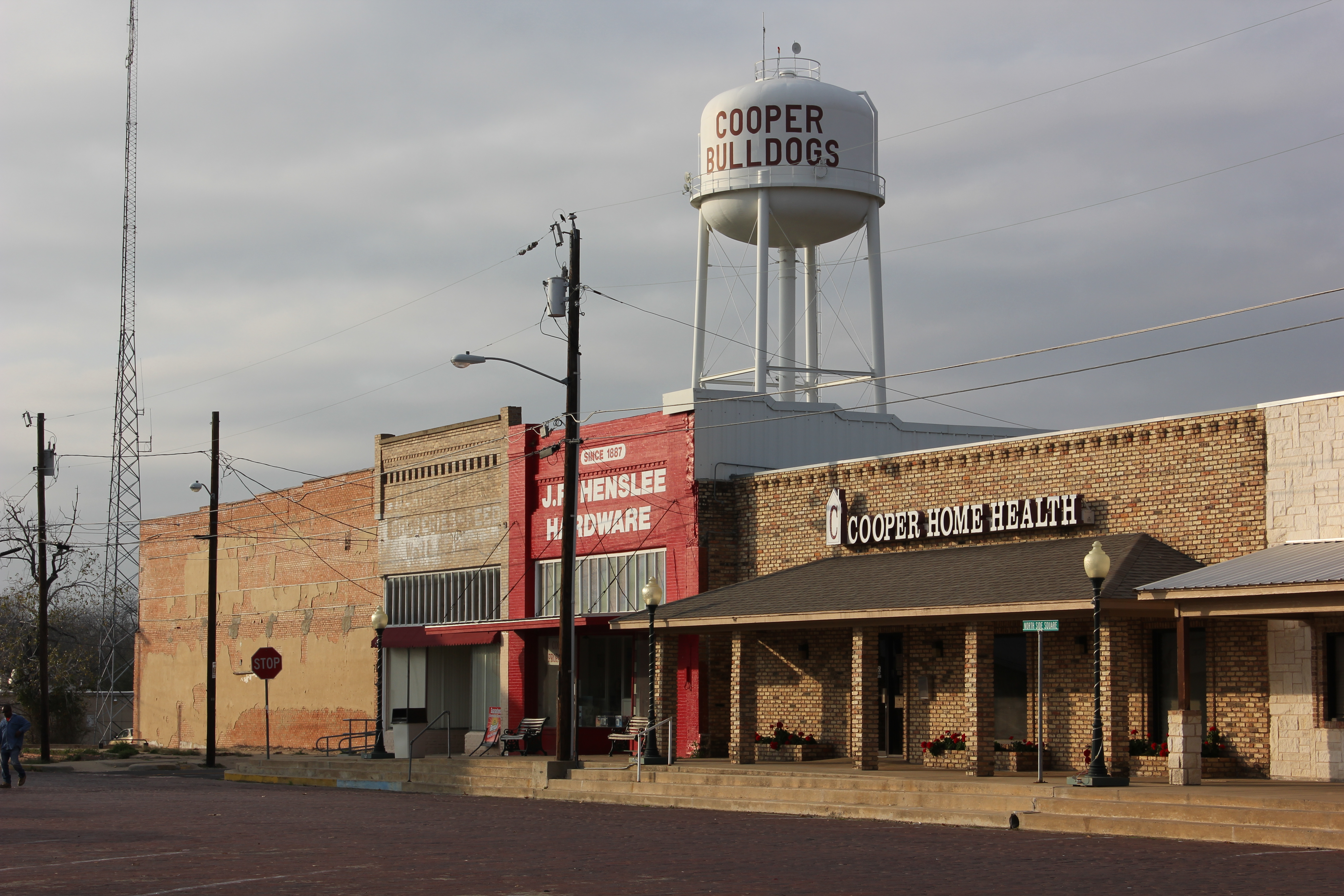
Businesses on Cooper's town square, December 2012

Cooper's economy relied heavily on agriculture from its founding until the 1950s, especially on the growing of cash crops. In 1880, cotton, corn, sorghum and other crops were grown on over 100,000 acres (40,000 ha) of farmland. The county also produced large quantities of livestock, with almost 3,000 cattle and 10,000 hogs grazing on land near Cooper. The logging industry began to grow in the region, and several mills were constructed, producing furniture and lumber. In 1886, the Santa Fe Railway built a line through the county, and the shipping of crops and lumber became a major business in Cooper. During the early 1890s, the livestock industry in Delta County struggled, with the number of hogs being raised dropping to half of what it had been the previous decade. However, the agricultural business boomed, with the number of farms in the area around Cooper increasing to 1,188, and the value of the farms doubled to $1,400 (equivalent to $3,957,800, respectively in 2022) each. The production of cotton tripled and the poultry industry began to boom. Within the city limits, Cooper had a hotel, a shoemaker, a grocery store, a wagon maker, feed stores, general stores, drug stores and several cotton and oat gins. Delta County contained 18 manufacturing establishments, but they only employed 33 people. The average income for someone working in the region was $208 (equivalent to $3,957,792 respectively in 2022).

At the start of the 20th century, the cotton industry was booming. The crop made up 69% of the agricultural business in the region. Livestock production was booming, as was poultry production, especially chicken. In addition, the shipping of agricultural goods and livestock was the other main business in Cooper. The First National Bank was rebuilt in 1909 and became an important factor in Cooper's economy. In the 1910s, potatoes become an important part of the economy due to the sudden drop in the livestock business. In 1926, the cotton crop failed and Cooper's economy plummeted. Many of Cooper's inhabitants became deep in debt as the price of crops plummeted. The lumber businesses had exhausted the regions resources, forcing most of them to go out of business. Many people moved away to find new work. The local economy stabilized in the mid-1930s, and cotton, potato, and corn production began to rise. The growing of oats, however, had ended. In addition, the railroad going through Cooper had failed a few years before, so the shipping industry in Cooper was struggling. Cotton and alfalfa carried Cooper's economy through the 1950s and 1960s, until the shift to the growing of wheat in the 1970s. Cooper reported 60 businesses in the 1970s, more than half of which were dairies. During the 1980s and 1990s, Cooper's economy shifted to the manufacturing and shipping of local goods, and in 1991, Cooper had 70 businesses.

Currently, Cooper's economy has several industries. According to the 2010 census, the industries in the town (by percentage of employed civilian population 16 years and over) were educational, health and social services at 34.6%, manufacturing at 18.7%, arts, entertainment, recreation, accommodation and food services with 13.6%, construction at 10.2%, transportation, warehousing and utilities at 5.1%, professional, scientific, management, administrative and waste management services at 4.9%, public administration with 4.3%, retail trade at 3.9%, finance, insurance, real estate and rental and leasing with 2.0%, other services (except public administration) with 1.6% and agriculture, forestry, fishing and hunting and mining at 1.0%.

Of the people in the labor force over the age of 16, 679 (49.3% of the population) were in the civilian work force, while 697 (50.7% of the population) were not in the labor force at all. At the time of the census, 70 people (5.1%) were unemployed, with none in the armed forces. Of the 609 employed residents over the age of 16, private-sector wage and salary workers accounted for 475 (78.0%). 109 (17.9%) were classified as federal government workers, with the self-employed making up 4.1% of the population. No one was classified as an unpaid worker.

The median household income for the city of Cooper was $27,531 with 137 persons (19.7%) in that class of income. 125 (18.0%) identified themselves as retired.

== Arts and culture ==
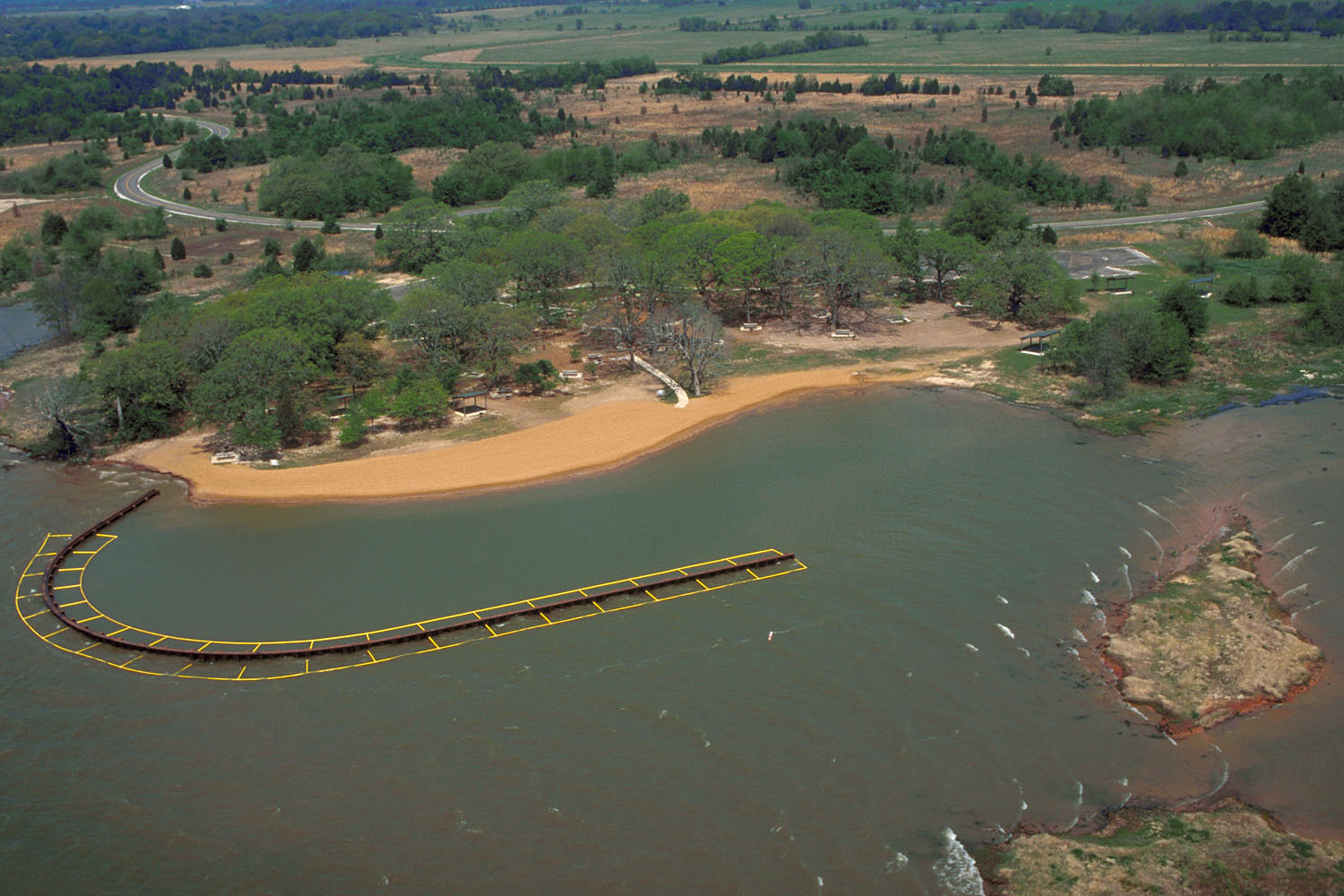
A swimming area on Cooper Lake: The lake is the most popular attraction in the area.

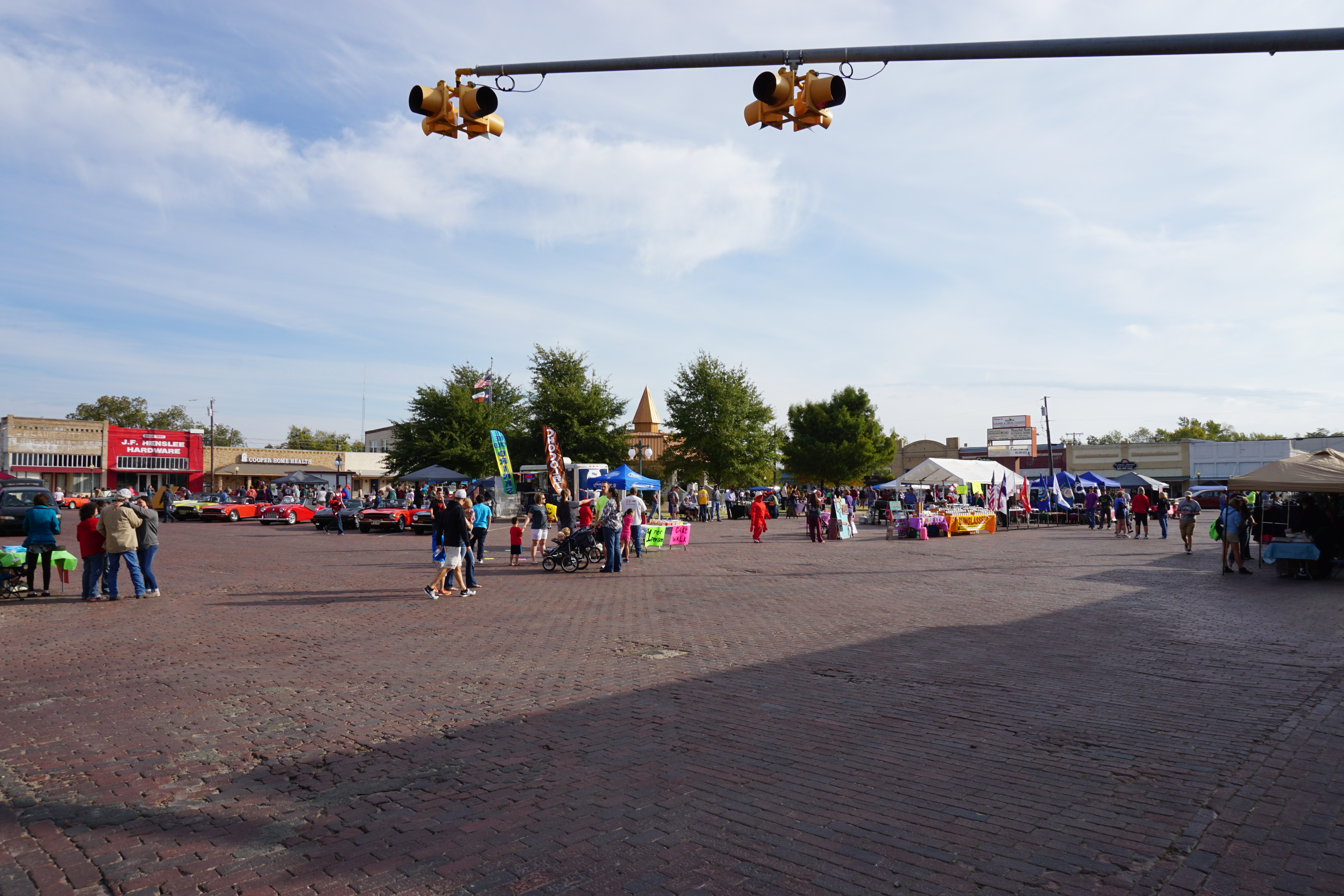
Chiggerfest in 2015

Since its founding, Cooper has been the center of attractions for Delta County. The city has several small schools and churches. In 1955, the construction of Cooper Lake was authorized. In 1986, major work on the lake began and it was finished in 1991. The lake is now the most popular tourist attraction in the area. Boating, swimming and fishing are available at Cooper Lake. The main fish stocked in the lake are catfish, largemouth bass and crappie. Along the north shore of the lake is the Doctor's Creek Unit of Cooper State Park. The park contains several picnic areas, campgrounds and a large swimming area on Cooper Lake. It also contains several hiking and equestrian trails. On the eastern edge of the lake near the Cooper Lake Dam is the Wildlife Observation Deck, a large birdwatching platform. Along the west and northwest shores of the lake is the Cooper Wildlife Management Area. The park was constructed by the U.S. Army Corps of Engineers and protects four unique habitat types. These are wetland, Blackland Prairie, Upland Post Oak and Bottomland Hardwood. The park contains several hiking trails, as well as birdwatching stations and wildlife viewing areas. The park allows fishing and hunting to visitors if they have a proper license.

Cooper hosts the annual Chiggerfest. The event, held every October, is a social gathering for the region. The two-day event begins with an open-air concert in Historic Cooper Square. Other events include a 5K run/walk and smashing a car. The festival includes numerous street vendors and a children's area. Patterson Memorial County Library is also located in Cooper, as well as a 15-acre (6.1 ha) municipal park and numerous recreational and community centers, including the historic McKinney Home, the house of Dr. John and May McKinney, which was built in 1912 and later restored by their descendant, the author Susan Albright Hyde.

== Government ==
Since its incorporation in 1870, Cooper has served as the seat for Delta County. Because of this, Cooper houses the county courthouse, county offices, sheriff, and county library. Cooper has a mayor–council government. The city council is made up of five members who are elected at large.

The first election in Delta County occurred on October 6, 1870, to establish control in the newly formed county. Cooper held its first election in 1881, establishing an aldermanic government. Around that time, the first county courthouse was built in Cooper. Delta County, in addition to Cooper, voted for the Democratic Party in every presidential election from its incorporation in 1870 until 1968. However, the Populist Party won numerous local and county government positions during the 1890s and the early 1900s. In the 1970s, politics in Delta County changed and most of the county began voting for the Republican Party.

== Education ==
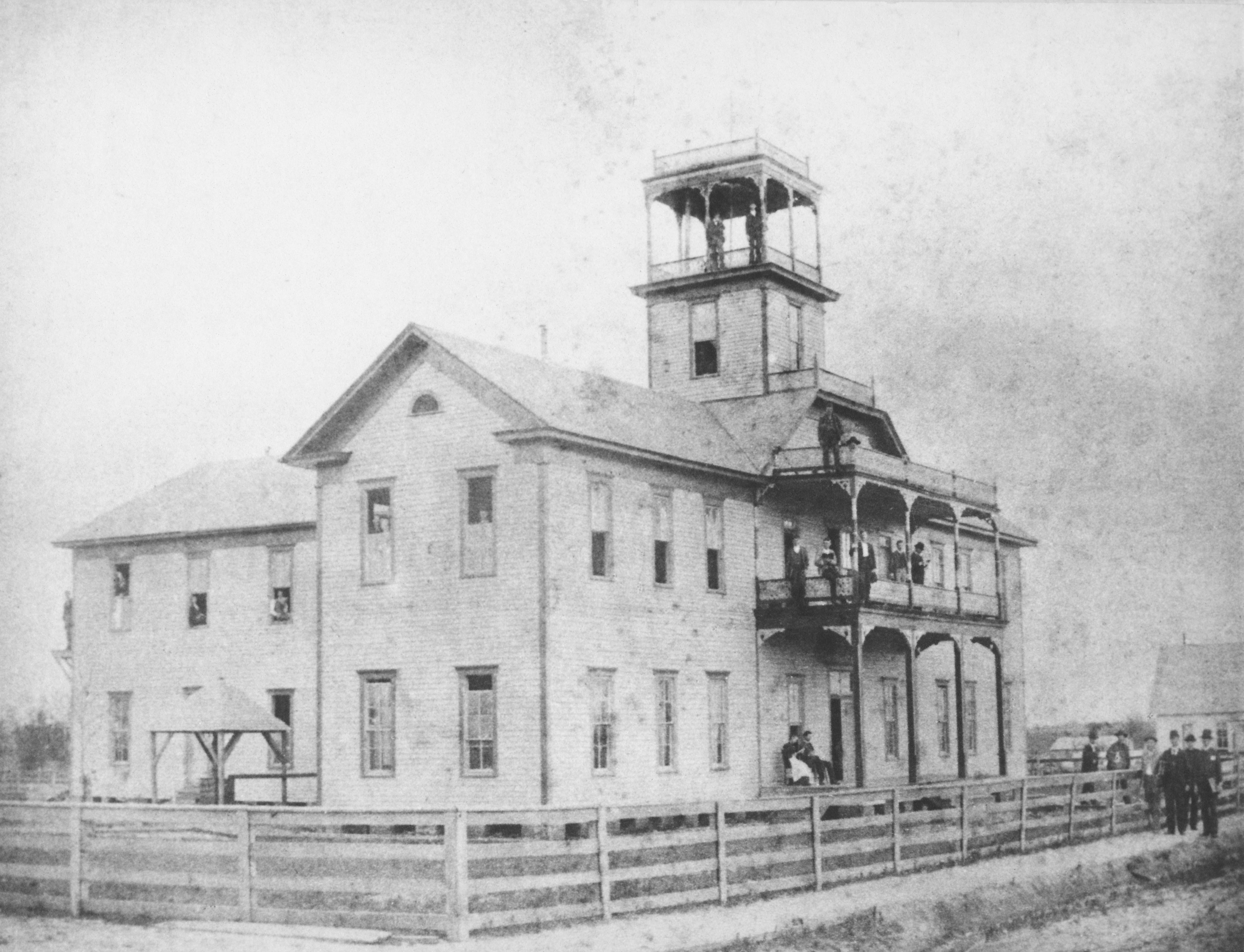
East Texas Normal College (now known as East Texas A&M University) was located in Cooper from 1889 until 1894, when the campus (pictured here in 1890) was destroyed in a fire.

Delta County has historically been advanced in education. Around the time that Cooper and the county were founded, nine churches were already in the county. By 1880, that number had increased to nearly 30. A combined 998 students attended those schools, which operated 4½ months a year. In 1889, East Texas Normal College was founded in Cooper. The school did very well while located in Cooper, but the college moved to Commerce after the campus was destroyed in a fire in 1894. The school was later renamed East Texas State University in 1964, and ultimately East Texas A&M University in 2024. In 1896, Cooper reported to have one successful school located within the city proper.

Schools were important during the 1940s, as they became the local activity centers. In the early 1940s, there were 34 common schools and six independent school districts within Delta County. These schools employed 134 people and had a combined total of 4,000 students enrolled. Cooper, along with Pecan Gap and Enloe, offered a four-year high school program. Late in the 1940s, with the help of state taxes on transportation, the schools and districts began to consolidate. In 1966, Cooper had two elementary schools, a junior high school, and a high school.

The Cooper Independent School District (Cooper ISD) currently operates the schools that serve Cooper. Cooper ISD covers the majority of Delta County, except for the community of Lake Creek, which is located within the jurisdiction of Chisum ISD, and the communities of Pecan Gap and Ben Franklin, which are located within Fannindel ISD. There are currently only three schools under the jurisdiction of Cooper ISD, all three of which are located within Cooper proper. The schools are Cooper Elementary School, Cooper Junior High School, and Cooper High School.

== Media ==
The first newspaper published in Cooper was the Delta Courier in 1873. The newspaper, published by Bob Michiel, ran weekly until the mid-1890s. Around the time the publishing of the Delta Courier ended, the People's Cause newspaper began running weekly. This eventually stopped running. The Cooper Review began weekly in 1982 is still published.

== Infrastructure ==
=== Transportation ===
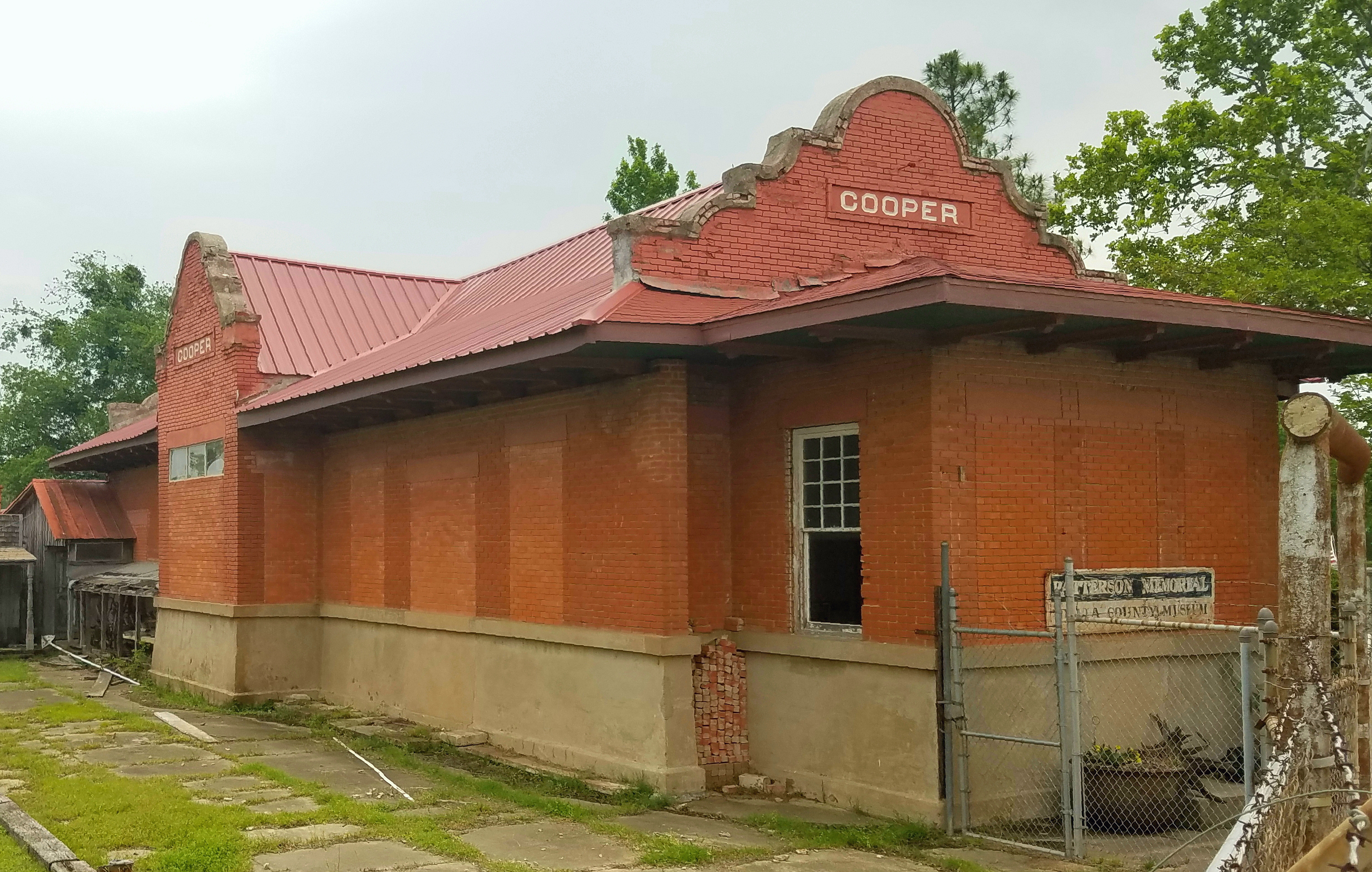
Texas Midland railroad depot, erected in 1913

Texas State Highway 154 (TX 154) intersects the city, passing through the central portion of Cooper. The highway begins at its terminus in the western portion of Cooper. The roadway travels eastward through central Cooper, before bending southeast and exiting the city. TX 154 travels within the Cooper proper for approximately 1.94 miles (3.12 km). TX 154 was first constructed through Cooper on September 26, 1935. State Highway 24 bypasses Cooper as a four-lane divided highway. Only 0.48 miles (0.77 km) of the highway pass through Cooper, traveling through the western edge of the city limits. TX 24 was originally designated through Cooper on September 26, 1939. However, TX 24 was rerouted around Cooper and, on January 14, 1991, the 1.94 miles (3.12 km) long portion of highway was redesignated as Texas State Highway 24 Business.

Farm to Market Road 64 (FM 64) enters the western portion of Cooper, traveling for a short distance before terminating at TX 154. The highway, which was constructed on June 23, 1942, spends approximately 0.41 miles (0.66 km) within the city. FM 1528, known locally as 1st Street, travels through the center of Cooper. Beginning at an intersection with TX 154, the highway travels southward through the city for about 0.6 miles (0.97 km), before exiting and turning westward. The road was constructed on September 28, 1949. Nearby highways include FM 1880, which travels from the edge of the city to a part of the Cooper Lake Wildlife Management Area, FM 128, which ends at an intersection with TX 24 a short distance north of Cooper, and FM 1529, which northward a short distance east of the city.

In 1886, the Santa Fe Railroad was constructed to the north of Cooper, through Ben Franklin and Pecan Gap. Nearly a decade later, in 1895, the Texas Midland Railroad was constructed through Cooper, helping the city's economy to boom. The extant depot was built in 1913 and, the railroad flourished until 1928, when it was sold to the Southern Pacific Corporation due to the region's struggling economy. The line was closed in 1934, and was abandoned in 1975. Currently, the only railroad to pass near Cooper is the Blacklands Railroad. Commerce Municipal Airport is currently the closest airfield to Cooper, located approximately 13 miles (21 km) away.

== Notable people ==
- Ron Morris, former professional American football wide receiver in the National Football League (NFL) for six seasons with the Chicago Bears
