= Charleston, Texas =

- Unincorporated community
- Location within Texas Location within the United States
- Coordinates: 33°23′11″N 95°32′02″W
- Country: United States
- State: Texas
- County: Delta
- Elevation: 440 ft (130 m)
- Time zone: UTC-6 (Central (CST))
  - Summer (DST): UTC-5 (CDT)
- Area codes: 903 & 430
- GNIS feature ID: 1354322

Charleston is an unincorporated community in Delta County, Texas, United States. According to the Handbook of Texas, its population was estimated at 120 in 2000.

== Geography ==
Charleston is located on Farm to Market Road 895, 9 mi (14 km) east of Cooper in southeastern Delta County. Evans Branch and McGuyer Branch border it to the east and west, respectively.

== Education ==
In 1867, the Charleston school district was established, and absorbed into the Cooper Independent School District by 1970.
