= Jim Chapman Lake =

- Cooper Lake
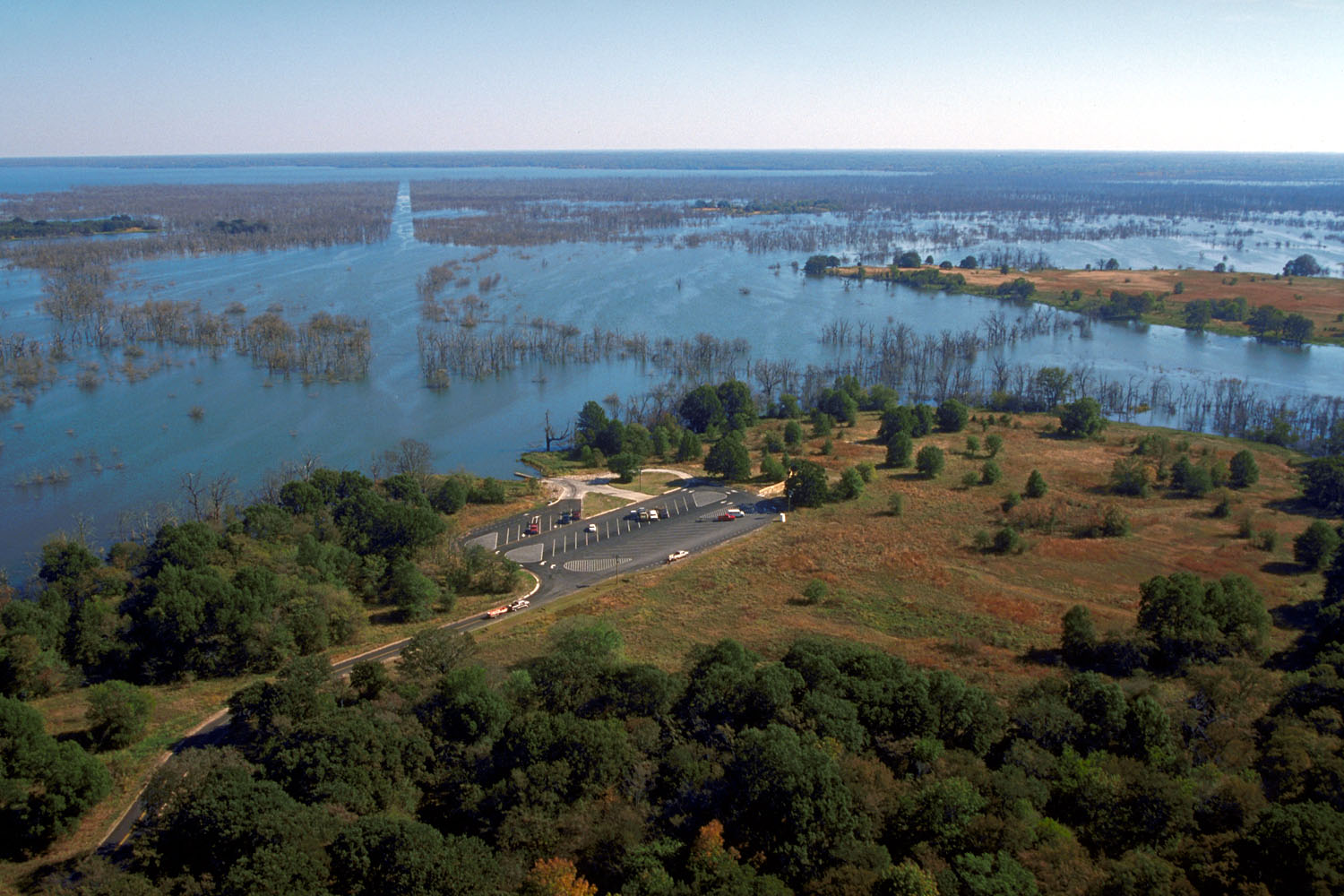

- Location within Texas Location within the United States
- Location: Delta / Hopkins counties, Texas, United States
- Coordinates: 33°19′25.12″N 95°38′45.39″W
- Type: reservoir
- Primary inflows: South Sulphur River
- Basin countries: United States
- Surface area: 19,305 acres (7,812 ha)

Jim Chapman Lake (also known as Cooper Lake) is a 19,305-acre (78.12 km^{2}) impoundment operated by the Army Corps of Engineers and is located 75 miles (121 km) east of the Dallas/Fort Worth Metroplex in the state of Texas.

The reservoir was created by the 1991 Jim Chapman Dam and impounds the South Sulphur River, a fork of the Sulphur River. It provides water supply storage for the North Texas Municipal Water District, the Sulphur River Municipal Water District. The lake is known as a preferred location for fishing in the region. Species likely to be caught are blue and channel catfish, Florida largemouth bass, crappie, and hybrid striped bass. The Texas Parks and Wildlife Department’s Cooper State Park is located on Jim Chapman Lake.

The lake was formerly known as Cooper Lake, but was renamed by an act of Congress in 1998 to honor Jim Chapman, a former congressman from nearby Sulphur Springs.
