= Cooper State Park =

State park in Cooper, Texas

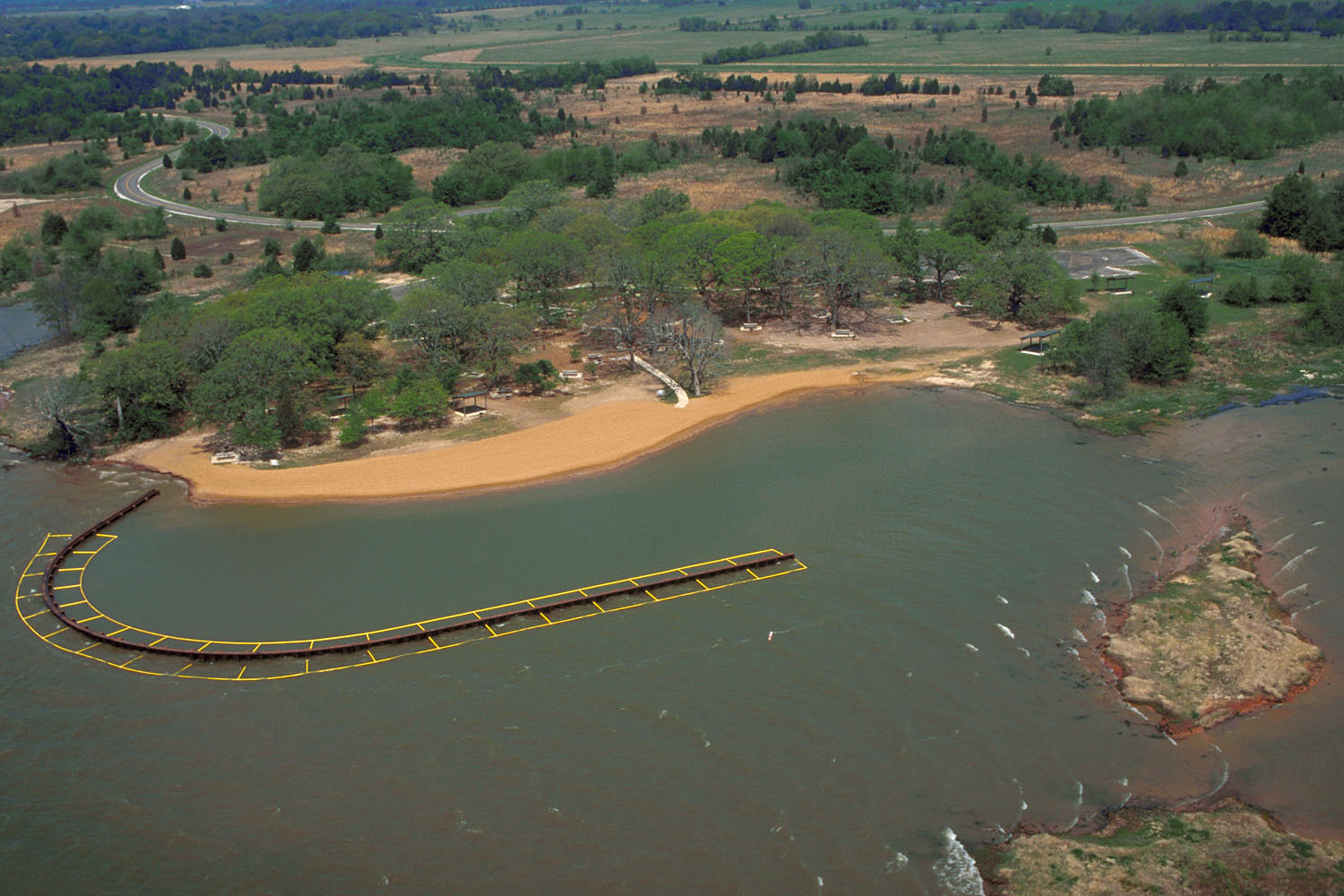
- A swimming area at Cooper Lake State Park

- Location within Texas Location within the United States
- Location: Delta County, Texas; Hopkins County, Texas
- Nearest city: Cooper, Texas
- Coordinates: 33°20′55.32″N 95°39′49.24″W
- Area: 3,026 acres (1,225 ha)
- Created: 1992
- Visitors: 123,210 (in 2025)
- Governing body: Texas Parks and Wildlife Department
- Website: Official site

Cooper State Park (formerly Cooper Lake State Park) is a 3,026 acres (1,225 ha) state park in Delta and Hopkins counties, Texas, United States that fully opened in 1996. The park is situated on Jim Chapman Lake. There are two geographically separate units; the Doctors Creek unit 33°20′54″N 95°40′08″W is located on the north side of the lake, in Delta County, while the South Sulphur unit 33°17′49″N 95°39′35″W is located on the south side of the lake, in Hopkins County. The Texas Parks and Wildlife Department (TPWD) manages the park.

== History ==
The park's land was inhabited by Caddo people until the 1800s, when settlers brought the agriculture (including cotton and dairy) and livestock industries to the area. Jim Chapman Lake itself was built between 1986 and 1991, by the U.S. Army Corps of Engineers and was originally named Cooper Lake. The United States Congress changed the name to Jim Chapman Lake in 1998. The TPWD renamed the park from Cooper Lake State Park to Cooper State Park in 2025.

== Nature ==
The park lies at the intersection of the Tallgrass Prairie and Post Oak Savannah ecoregions. There is a diverse variety of mammals (including the gray fox and Mexican long-nosed armadillo) and birds in the park, and multiple species of catfish, crappie, and bass in the lake.

== See also ==
- List of Texas state parks
