= Cooper Independent School District =

School district in Texas

Location
- Cooper, TX ESC Region 8 USA

District information
- Type: Public
- Grades: Pre-K through 12
- Established: 1906
- Superintendent: Denicia Hohenberger
- Schools: 3
- Budget: $7.75 million (USD)
- NCES District ID: 4815150

Students and staff
- Students: 773
- Teachers: 72
- Staff: 134
- Student–teacher ratio: 11.54
- Athletic conference: UIL Class AA
- District mascot: Bulldogs
- Colors: Maroon and Gray

Other information
- TEA District Accountability Rating for 2011-12: Academically Acceptable
- Website: Cooper ISD

Cooper Independent School District is a public school district based in Cooper, Texas (USA). Located in Delta County, a very small portion of the district extends into Hunt County.

== History ==
=== 19th century ===
Delta County was first inhabited by European settlers in the 1820s, when the area around present-day Ben Franklin was developed. The area saw an influx of settlers in the 1830s, many coming from the southeastern United States. In 1846, control of the area was split between Hopkins and Lamar Counties by the Texas Legislature. The area continued to grow rapidly, developing into a largely agricultural area. In 1868, inhabitants of the area petitioned the state of Texas for the creation of a new county, and in 1870, the petition was granted and Delta County was formed, with its government based in the newly formed city of Cooper.

The history of education in Delta County began in 1847, when a group of pioneers from Shiloh, Tennessee constructed a combined church, school, and community center on the bank of the South Sulphur River. The building was known simply as the Shiloh School. In 1859, the second school in the area was founded, when inhabitants of Giles founded Giles Academy, which was run by Thomas Hockaday and was respected by the region. Although citizens of the Delta County area were divided between secession and Sam Houston's unionist views, the region generally escaped any Civil War conflict. The only major event was the court-marshal and hanging of three underground Union soldiers. Having effectively avoided the war, the area had little rebuilding to do after the end of conflict. However, during the period when the rest of the country was going through reconstruction, the Delta County area focused on expanding its education. Before and during the war, there were just nine schools in what would become the county. By 1880, this number had increased to around thirty, and served 998 students during four-and-a-half months of the year. One of the new schools was the Horton School, built around 1867, which served as the community center of the flourishing small community of Horton. The majority of the new schools were ones serving individual small communities. Sylvia Wood and Judy Falls wrote that "Even the early rural communities had some type of schools".

The county's education system continued to expand through the 1880s and 90s. Sometime around 1879, the Antioch School was founded and would become a school district shortly afterward. Sometime in the early 1880s, the Brushy Mound School was constructed, serving its respective community. The Amy School was built in 1890 and served the community of Amy until 1905, due to declining enrollment and citizens in the community. In 1896, Cooper built its first school; previously, the city had been focusing on establishing a government and its economy. During the 1890s, the state of Texas passed a number of laws allowing for more freedom to cities about creating schools, and the new laws lead to the creation of independent school districts. At the turn of the century, there were already 526 school districts in the state. In Delta County, an instance of this occurred when, in 1897, the Enloe School absorbed either the Mount Hebron School or the Hagood School and formed the Enloe School District.

=== 20th and 21st centuries ===
The region's education system continued to advance during the early 1900s. In 1900, the developing community of Rattan constructed its own school, and two years later both the Kensing School and William Price's Price School opened their doors. Shortly afterwards, the Lake Creek School consolidated with the small Andersonville School District and absorbed a portion of the Darwin School District, forming the Lake Creek School District. In 1911, the state of Texas passed its rural high school law, which made it easier for rural high schools to be created and form common school districts. Around that time, the county education system was at its highest point, with eighty-one schools existing within the county. Twenty-four of those schools had been consolidated with other ones or would be consolidated in the next few years. Around seventy-five of those schools would later become part of the Cooper School District.

== Schools ==
Cooper ISD has three campuses -

- Cooper High School (Grades 9–12),
- Cooper Junior High School (Grades 6–8)
- Cooper Elementary School (Grades PK-5)

In 2009, the school district was rated "academically acceptable" by the Texas Education Agency.
