= Delta County, Texas =

County in Texas, United States

- County
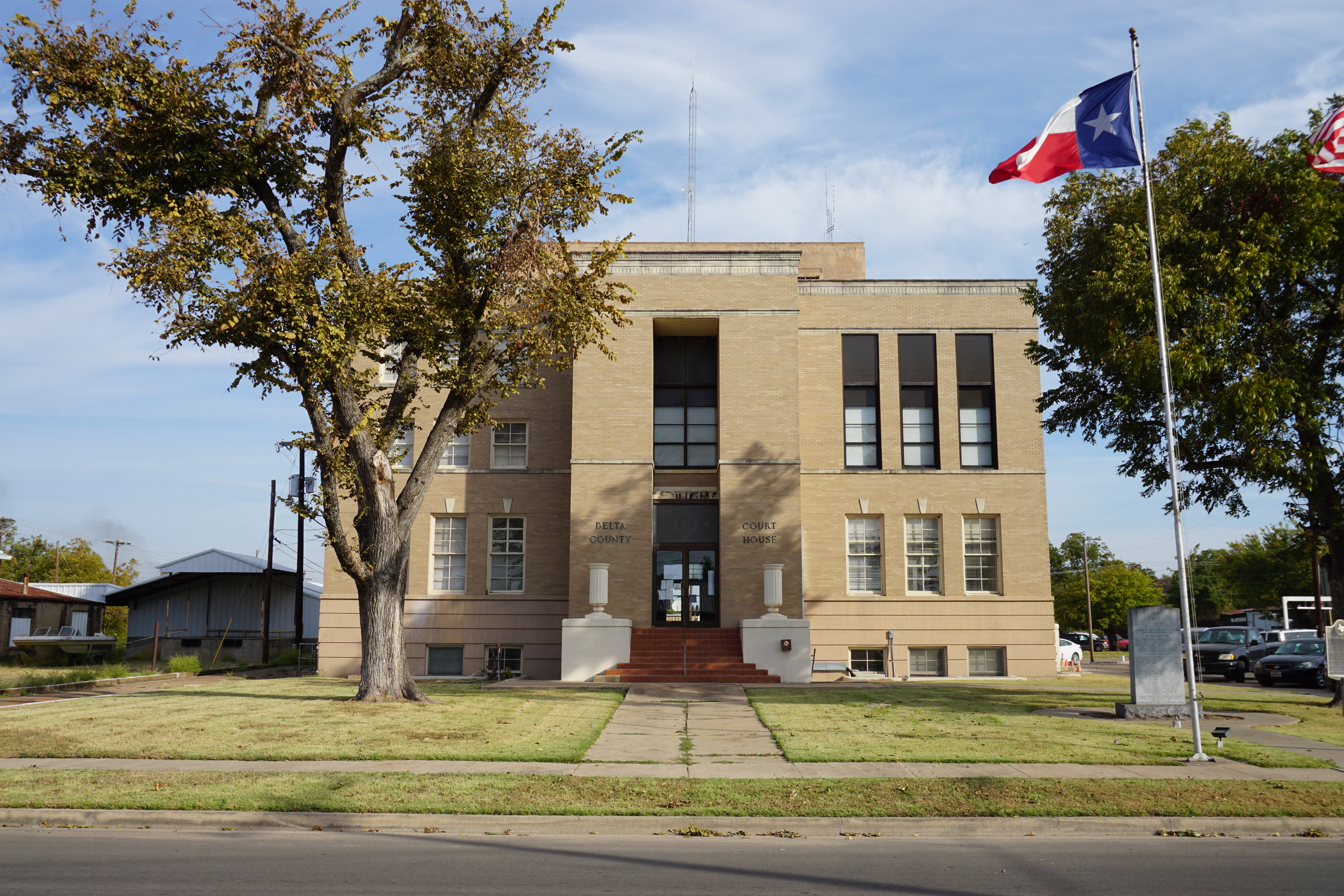
- Delta County Courthouse in Cooper

- Location within the U.S. state of Texas
- Coordinates: 33°23′N 95°40′W
- Country: United States
- State: Texas
- Founded: 1870
- Seat: Cooper
- Largest city: Cooper

Area
  - Total: 278 sq mi (720 km^{2})
  - Land: 257 sq mi (670 km^{2})
  - Water: 21 sq mi (54 km^{2}) 7.6%

Population (2020)
  - Total: 5,230
  - Estimate (2025): 5,549 ▲
  - Density: 20.4/sq mi (7.86/km^{2})
- Time zone: UTC−6 (Central)
  - Summer (DST): UTC−5 (CDT)
- Congressional district: 4th
- Website: www.deltacountytx.com

Delta County is a county located in the U.S. state of Texas. As of the 2020 census, its population was 5,230. Its county seat and largest city is Cooper. The county was founded in 1870 and is named for its triangular shape, which resembles the Greek letter delta.

Meanders of two forks of the Sulphur River formed its northern and southern boundaries and meet at its easternmost point. Delta County was one of 19 prohibition, or entirely dry, counties in the state of Texas. As of 2015, Delta County is no longer a dry county.

== Geography ==
According to the U.S. Census Bureau, the county has a total area of 278 sq mi (720 km^{2}), of which 257 sq mi (670 km^{2}) are land and 21 sq mi (54 km^{2}) (7.6%) are covered by water.

=== Major highways ===
- State Highway 19
- State Highway 24
- State Highway 154

=== Adjacent counties ===
- Lamar County (north)
- Red River County (northeast)
- Franklin County (southeast)
- Hopkins County (south)
- Hunt County (southwest)
- Fannin County (northwest)

== Communities ==
=== Cities ===
- Cooper
- Pecan Gap (small part in Fannin County)

=== Unincorporated communities ===
- Antioch
- Ben Franklin
- Charleston
- Cleveland
- Crossroads
- East Delta
- Enloe
- Horton
- Jot Em Down
- Kensing
- Klondike
- Lake Creek
- Pacio
- Post Oak
- Rattan
- Vasco
- Yowell

=== Ghost towns ===
- Friendship
- Gough
- Liberty Grove
- Mount Joy
- Needmore
- Prattville
- Price
- West Delta

== Demographics ==
Historical population
Census	Pop.	Note	%±
1880	5,597		—
1890	9,117		62.9%
1900	15,249		67.3%
1910	14,566		−4.5%
1920	15,887		9.1%
1930	13,138		−17.3%
1940	12,858		−2.1%
1950	8,964		−30.3%
1960	5,860		−34.6%
1970	4,927		−15.9%
1980	4,839		−1.8%
1990	4,857		0.4%
2000	5,327		9.7%
2010	5,231		−1.8%
2020	5,230		0.0%
2025 (est.)	5,549	▲	6.1%
U.S. Decennial Census; 1850–2010 2010–2020

=== Racial and ethnic composition ===
Delta County, Texas – Racial and ethnic composition Note: the US Census treats Hispanic/Latino as an ethnic category. This table excludes Latinos from the racial categories and assigns them to a separate category. Hispanics/Latinos may be of any race.
Race / Ethnicity (NH = Non-Hispanic)	Pop 1980	Pop 1990	Pop 2000	Pop 2010	Pop 2020	% 1980	% 1990	% 2000	% 2010	% 2020
White alone (NH)	4,396	4,344	4,616	4,351	4,189	90.85%	89.44%	86.65%	83.18%	80.10%
Black or African American alone (NH)	396	400	440	375	312	8.18%	8.24%	8.26%	7.17%	5.97%
Native American or Alaska Native alone (NH)	22	39	29	59	42	0.45%	0.80%	0.54%	1.13%	0.80%
Asian alone (NH)	4	7	6	30	37	0.08%	0.14%	0.11%	0.57%	0.71%
Native Hawaiian or Pacific Islander alone (NH)	x	x	2	0	5	x	x	0.04%	0.00%	0.10%
Other race alone (NH)	1	0	0	11	30	0.02%	0.00%	0.00%	0.21%	0.57%
Mixed race or Multiracial (NH)	x	x	69	117	221	x	x	1.30%	2.24%	4.23%
Hispanic or Latino (any race)	20	67	165	288	394	0.41%	1.38%	3.10%	5.51%	7.53%
Total	4,839	4,857	5,327	5,231	5,230	100.00%	100.00%	100.00%	100.00%	100.00%

=== 2020 census ===
As of the 2020 census, the county had a population of 5,230. The median age was 44.5 years, with 22.0% of residents under the age of 18 and 23.6% aged 65 years or older. For every 100 females there were 95.5 males, and for every 100 females age 18 and over there were 94.1 males age 18 and over.

The racial makeup of the county was 82.5% White, 6.0% Black or African American, 0.9% American Indian and Alaska Native, 0.7% Asian, 0.1% Native Hawaiian and Pacific Islander, 2.8% from some other race, and 7.0% from two or more races. Hispanic or Latino residents of any race comprised 7.5% of the population.

<0.1% of residents lived in urban areas, while 100.0% lived in rural areas.

There were 2,095 households in the county, of which 28.6% had children under the age of 18 living in them. Of all households, 50.8% were married-couple households, 17.7% were households with a male householder and no spouse or partner present, and 27.0% were households with a female householder and no spouse or partner present. About 27.0% of all households were made up of individuals and 14.9% had someone living alone who was 65 years of age or older.

There were 2,420 housing units, of which 13.4% were vacant. Among occupied housing units, 76.2% were owner-occupied and 23.8% were renter-occupied. The homeowner vacancy rate was 1.3% and the rental vacancy rate was 8.6%.

== Politics ==
Delta County is located within District 62 of the Texas House of Representatives and is represented by Republican Shelley Luther of Sherman, Texas, and in District 1 of the Texas Senate, represented by Republican Bryan Hughes of Mineola, Texas.

In the United States House of Representatives, Delta County is located within Texas' 4th district and is represented by Pat Fallon of Frisco, Texas.

United States presidential election results for Delta County, Texas
Year	Republican		Democratic		Third party(ies)	
Year	No.	%	No.	%	No.	%
1912	57	7.05%	705	87.25%	46	5.69%
1916	72	4.97%	1,254	86.48%	124	8.55%
1920	315	21.03%	1,081	72.16%	102	6.81%
1924	479	17.64%	2,186	80.49%	51	1.88%
1928	753	43.96%	958	55.93%	2	0.12%
1932	87	4.14%	2,013	95.81%	1	0.05%
1936	82	5.29%	1,466	94.64%	1	0.06%
1940	190	7.90%	2,214	92.10%	0	0.00%
1944	133	6.69%	1,706	85.86%	148	7.45%
1948	146	7.68%	1,594	83.89%	160	8.42%
1952	707	30.81%	1,585	69.06%	3	0.13%
1956	605	32.23%	1,262	67.23%	10	0.53%
1960	460	25.11%	1,360	74.24%	12	0.66%
1964	339	17.30%	1,619	82.60%	2	0.10%
1968	370	19.66%	1,037	55.10%	475	25.24%
1972	957	61.90%	581	37.58%	8	0.52%
1976	421	21.15%	1,563	78.50%	7	0.35%
1980	767	35.81%	1,347	62.89%	28	1.31%
1984	1,024	51.17%	973	48.63%	4	0.20%
1988	849	40.41%	1,244	59.21%	8	0.38%
1992	599	29.73%	864	42.88%	552	27.39%
1996	744	42.69%	849	48.71%	150	8.61%
2000	1,143	60.16%	726	38.21%	31	1.63%
2004	1,447	69.50%	627	30.12%	8	0.38%
2008	1,580	72.25%	589	26.93%	18	0.82%
2012	1,524	75.52%	454	22.50%	40	1.98%
2016	1,836	80.49%	400	17.54%	45	1.97%
2020	2,162	83.41%	403	15.55%	27	1.04%
2024	2,250	84.65%	397	14.94%	11	0.41%

United States Senate election results for Delta County, Texas1
Year	Republican		Democratic		Third party(ies)	
Year	No.	%	No.	%	No.	%
2024	2,158	81.28%	453	17.06%	44	1.66%

United States Senate election results for Delta County, Texas2
Year	Republican		Democratic		Third party(ies)	
Year	No.	%	No.	%	No.	%
2020	2,111	83.31%	370	14.60%	53	2.09%

Texas Gubernatorial election results for Delta County
Year	Republican		Democratic		Third party(ies)	
Year	No.	%	No.	%	No.	%
2022	1,711	84.41%	295	14.55%	21	1.04%

== See also ==
- List of counties in Texas
- Dry counties
- List of museums in North Texas
- Recorded Texas Historic Landmarks in Delta County
