= Research history of Tylosaurus =

Studies of an extinct aquatic reptile

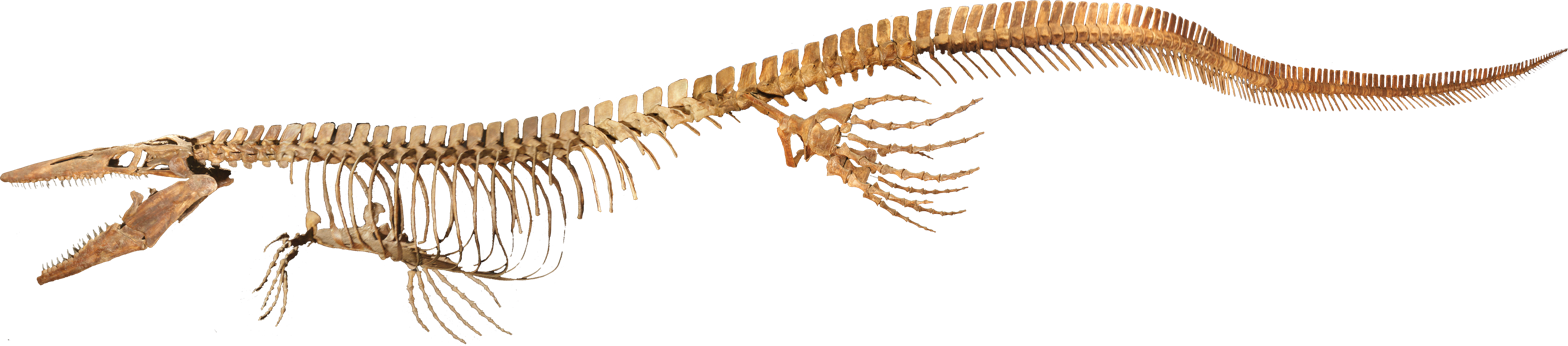
Mounted cast of the T. rex "Bunker" specimen (KUVP 5033), at the Rocky Mountain Dinosaur Resource Center, Woodland Park

The research history of Tylosaurus is extensive given to its long taxonomic and cultural histories, with the earliest record of its fossils dating back to 1869, when Edward Drinker Cope described a partial specimen from Kansas, USA. Initially named as Macrosaurus proriger, Cope later moved the species to the genus Liodon. Over the following years, he described two additional species that he assigned to this genus. In 1872, Othniel Charles Marsh established the genus name Tylosaurus, literally meaning "knob lizard" in reference to the animal's rostrum, in order to include a species that he had previously described as well as two of the species described by Cope. This name began to be used the following year by Joseph Leidy, although Cope, being in rivalry with Marsh, did not adopt it. In 1894, John Campbell Merriam definitively transferred the species of Liodon described by Cope and Marsh to Tylosaurus, and one of them was placed in synonymy with the type species T. proriger by Dale A. Russell in 1967.

Cope described Tylosaurus in 1870 as an imposing marine reptile sharing a morphology similar to a sea serpent and whose size would have been that of the largest cetaceans, an interpretation that was followed in various paleoarts at that time. In an 1898 revision, Samuel Wendell Williston presented a much more precise skeletal reconstruction of the animal that is still recognised as accurate for modern standards. From the 19th to the 21st century, several mosasaurids species since attributed to Tylosaurus were initially described as coming from different genera. One of these genera, Hainosaurus, is mainly recognized as a junior synonym of Tylosaurus since a 2016 study, although some authors suggested to keep it distinct and valid again. Nine species of Tylosaurus are currently recognized, namely T. proriger, T. nepaeolicus, T. bernardi, T. gaudryi, T. ivoensis, T. iembeensis, T. pembinensis, T. saskatchewanensis, and T. rex. The validity of two additional taxa remain unsettled; there is still debate whether T. kansasensis is synonymous with T. nepaeolicus, and T. "borealis" has yet to be described in a formal publication.

== Initial discoveries ==
=== Possible earlier finds ===
Several possible fossils coming from Tylosaurus were possibly discovered long before the genus was formally described and named in scientific literature, making it the first known mosasaur. The discovery of its fossils would have influenced the folk stories present among certain Native Americans peoples. The oldest possible discovery concerning it was possibly made by the North American people of the Lenapes, before the arrival of European settlers, around before the 1500s. An old legend tells about discovery made by hunters of a bone fragment coming from a monster that killed people in territories that would correspond to present-day Philadelphia, Pennsylvania or New Jersey. After the discovery, the hunters, having taken the bone to their home village, were quickly encouraged by a local wise man to find other remains of this same creature. According to the wise man, smoking the bone with tobacco would promote various positive things such as good health for children, longevity or even a successful hunt. Tylosaurus fossils have been discovered in the area where this legend may have emerged. However, remains of dinosaurs and crocodilians from the Cretaceous period are also known there, changing the origin of the story.

In a slightly more recent period, around the 1600s, the Dakota and Cheyenne peoples speak of tales of an ancient era ruled by massive aquatic creatures that were in constant fight with thunderbirds. According to the tales, these aquatic monsters were petrified by lightning struck by the thunderbirds, and their remains have been found on the ground ever since. The stories provided by the Pawnee and Crow peoples depict similar aquatic creatures living in rivers. These are described as having a crocodile-like heads with serpentine bodies, and having legs or even fins. The Great Plains, where the peoples from which these legends originated, are known to provide a considerable number of fossils of large mosasaurs such as Tylosaurus and pterosaurs such as Pteranodon, which may have been the source of these legends.

The first possible recorded discovery of a mosasaur in North America was of a partial skeleton described as "a fish" in 1804 by Meriwether Lewis and William Clark's Corps of Discovery during their 1804–1806 expedition across the western United States. It was found by Sergeant Patrick Gass on black sulfur bluffs near the Cedar Island alongside the Missouri River and consisted of some teeth and a disarticulated vertebral column measuring 45 feet (14 m) in length. Four members of the expedition recorded the discovery in their journals including Clark and Gass. Some parts of the fossil were collected and sent back to Washington, D.C., where it was lost before any proper documentation could be made. In 2003, Richard Ellis speculated that the remains may have belonged to Mosasaurus missouriensis. Alternatively, a 2007 study led by Robert W. Meredith and colleagues suggested that the fossils would possibly come from a tylosaurine mosasaur based on the measurements cited by Clark and Gass and the evidence of Tylosaurus fossils that have been found in the Missouri River. However, the authors also mentioned the possibility that the remains would also come from an elasmosaurid plesiosaur, which are also known from the river, although being rarer.

In 1858, Ebenezer Emmons described a single tooth of a mosasaur as a new genus and species, Elliptonodon compressus. In 1967, Halsey W. Miller examined a cast of the type specimen, catalogued as USNM 7444 in the National Museum of Natural History, and tentatively referred it to Tylosaurus? sp. based on the supposed similarities between the tooth and an anterior (front) tooth from a Tylosaurus jaw, catalogued as USNM 3763 and housed in the same institution. In the same year, Dale A. Russell conversely suggested that the type and only known specimen most closely resembles the tooth of Prognathodon, but argued that it is too fragmentary with uncertain locality of origin, and concluded that E. compressus should be classified as a nomen dubium (dubious name).

=== First formal discoveries and naming ===
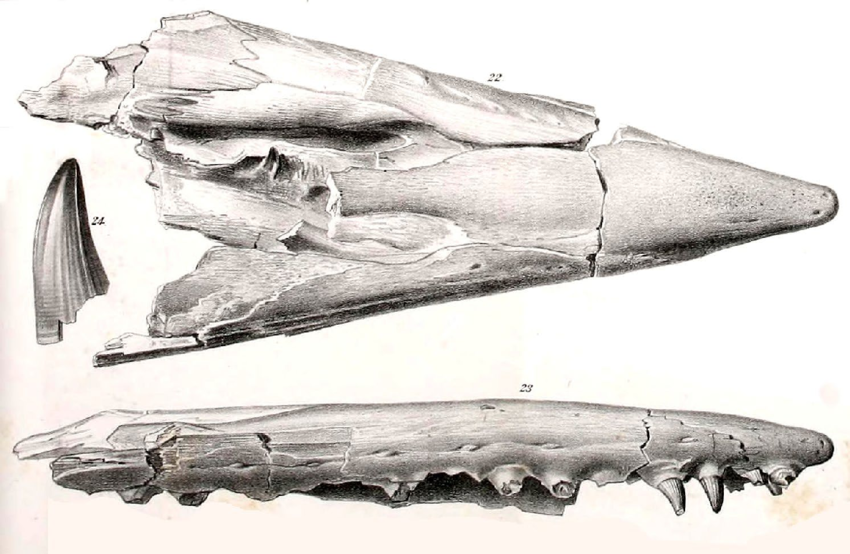
The skull of MCZ 4374, the holotype specimen of T. proriger, in Cope (1870)

Tylosaurus was the third new genus of mosasaur to be described from North America behind Clidastes and Platecarpus and the first in Kansas. The early history of the genus as a taxon was subject to complications spurred by the infamous rivalry between American paleontologists Edward Drinker Cope and Othniel Charles Marsh during the Bone Wars. The type specimen consisted of a partial skull around 1 metre (3 ft 3 in) in length associated with thirteen vertebrae. The history of its discovery remains partly uncertain due to conflicting accounts and differing information regarding its type locality. The earliest contemporary mentions date to late 1868 in two regional Kansas newspapers, where the discovery was attributed to the fossil collector William E. Webb, who was then the first documented owner of the specimen. All sources agree that the specimen most likely originated from the Smoky Hill Chalk of the Niobrara Formation. Museum records indicate that it was discovered near Monument Rocks, in western Gove County, Kansas. However, in 1875, Cope stated that the fossils had actually been discovered by the U.S. Army colonel John Butler Conyngham and a certain Mr. Minor, near the Monument station along the Kansas Pacific Railroad. (Note: Between 1869 and 1875, Cope successively assigned several different localities to the holotype specimen, reflecting the uncertainty surrounding its exact provenance. In his first published account in 1869, he stated that the fossils originated from the town of Hayden. Later that same year, he instead placed the discovery near the Union Pacific Railroad, close to Fort Hays. Finally, in 1875, Cope identified the vicinity of Monument as the origin locality, while explicitly acknowledging that his earlier reference to Fort Hays had been an "error".) This latter locality is generally regarded as the most probable, although further studies are still required to confirm it. Only after this discovery was the specimen acquired by Webb in 1868, most likely through Conyngham, although the exact circumstances surrounding this transfer remain uncertain.

In August of the same year, the Swiss naturalist Louis Agassiz and several other prominent figures passed through the town of Monument. It was probably on this occasion that Agassiz met Webb, and perhaps also Conyngham, subsequently acquiring the specimen and depositing it in the Harvard's Museum of Comparative Zoology under the catalog number MCZ VPRA 4374, where it is still housed today. The receipt documenting Agassiz's payment of $500 to Webb, dated April 6, 1869, is also preserved with the specimen. In addition, the sixth tooth of the right maxilla was mistakenly catalogued under the number MCZ 1596, whereas the correct catalog number appears on the remaining fossil elements. At the December 21, 1868 meeting of the Academy of Natural Sciences of Philadelphia, the American paleontologist Joseph Leidy presented photographs of the specimen that had been sent to him by Webb, provisionally identifying it as belonging to the genus Mosasaurus. It was most likely during this same meeting that Cope first saw these photographs, after which he borrowed the specimen from Agassiz and presented its first scientific description at another meeting of the Academy in June of the following year. Cope's first publication of the fossil was very brief and was named Macrosaurus proriger, the genus being a preexisting European mosasaur taxon. The specific epithet proriger means "prow-bearing", which is in reference to the specimen's unique prow-like elongated rostrum and is derived from the Latin word prōra (prow) and suffix -gero (I bear). In 1870, Cope published a more thorough description of MCZ 4374. Without explanation, he moved the species into another European genus Liodon and declared his original Macrosaurus proriger a synonym. In his 1870 and 1875 descriptions, Cope described and illustrated several additional vertebrae that he referred to the holotype specimen. However, as these elements are not associated with the specimen as it is currently preserved, it remains uncertain whether they were subsequently lost or were, in fact, never part of the holotype.

In 1871, Cope identified a second species of North American Liodon based on several vertebrae and limb fragments, which he named Liodon dyspelor. The fossils came to Cope under the label as having been collected by an army doctor named William B. Lyon at Fort McRae, New Mexico. However, a 1997 study led by David C. Parris of the New Jersey State Museum found that the chemical composition of the fossil did not match any known geological deposit in New Mexico and is instead identical to that of the Niobrara Formation; the study speculated from examinations of multiple letters between Lyon and the Smithsonian Institution that the Liodon dyspelor fossils were actually recovered from somewhere in Western Kansas and were mislabeled as being collected by Lyon in New Mexico (who was shipping a different fossil from Fort McRae around the same time) during transit. The type specimen of the taxon is split between two museums; some of the vertebrae went to Cope's American Museum of Natural History as AMNH 1580 while the rest were sent to the Smithsonian as USNM 41.

In 1872, Marsh argued that Liodon proriger and Liodon dyspelor are taxonomically distinct from the European genus and must be assigned a new one. For this, he erected the genus Rhinosaurus, which means "nose lizard" and is a portmanteau derived from the Ancient Greek words ῥίς (rhī́s, meaning "nose") and σαῦρος (saûros, meaning "lizard"). Marsh also described a third species based on a partial skeleton he collected near the southern portion of the Smoky Hill River that is now in the Yale Peabody Museum as YPM 1268, which Marsh named Rhinosaurus micromus. Cope responded by arguing that Rhinosaurus was already a preoccupied synonym of Liodon. He disagreed with Marsh's arguments but proposed that in case Marsh was indeed correct, the genus name Rhamphosaurus should be used. Marsh later discovered that the taxon Rhamphosaurus was preoccupied as a genus of lizard named in 1843. As a result, he suggested a move to a newly erected genus named Tylosaurus. This name means "knob lizard" in another reference to the elongated rostrum characteristic of the genus. It is derived from the Latin tylos (knob) and Ancient Greek σαῦρος. Despite coining the new genus, Marsh never formally transferred the Rhinosaurus species to Tylosaurus; this was first done in 1873 by Joseph Leidy of the University of Pennsylvania by transferring Rhinosaurus proriger and Rhinosaurus dyspelor to Tylosaurus. Rhinosaurus micromus was formally transferred to the same genus in 1894 by John Campbell Merriam, a paleontologist of LMU Munich at the time.

Tylosaurus subsequently became the near-universally accepted genus for T. proriger, T. dyspelor, and T. micromus. An exception to this adoption was Cope, who refused to accept Marsh's new genus and continued to refer to its species as Liodon. Cope also insisted that Rhamphosaurus was not preoccupied, arguing that while it was indeed used as a genus of lizard, it was subsequently synonymized with other genera before 1872 and was thus a vacant taxon. Cope's persistence can be seen in his 1874 description of the fourth described species of Tylosaurus, which he named Liodon nepaeolicus. This type specimen of this species consists of a right lower jaw, a partial upper jaw, a quadrate bone, and a dorsal vertebra and was discovered by geologist Benjamin Franklin Mudge in an unspecified deposit of Cretaceous grey shale about a half-mile south of the Solomon River. The type locality of the taxon remains unknown, but it is thought to have been situated near the town of Stockton, in Rooks County, Kansas, within an undetermined stratigraphic unit of the Niobrara Formation. The fossils of this specimen are currently housed at the American Museum of Natural History under the catalog number AMNH FARB 1565. The specific epithet nepaeolicus is in reference to the Nepaholla, the Native American name for the Solomon River. Liodon nepaeolicus was formally transferred to the genus Tylosaurus in Merriam's 1894 publication.

== 19th and 20th century developments ==
=== Early depictions ===
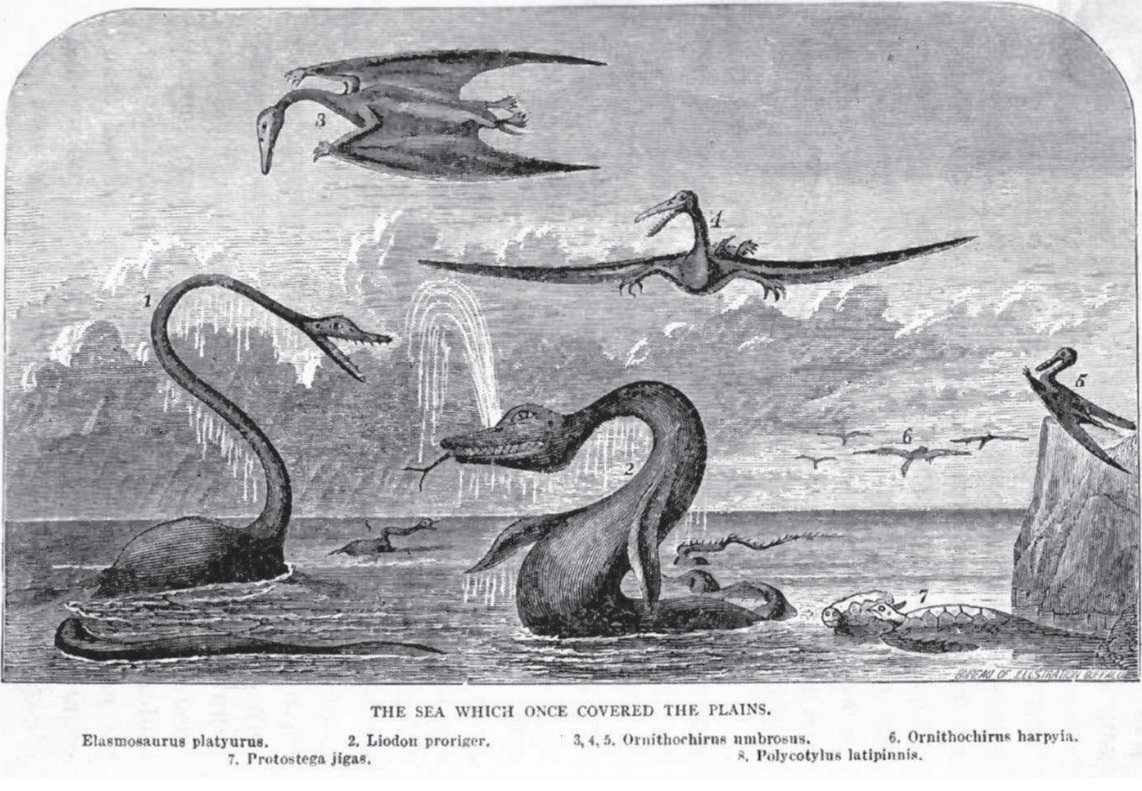
Early restoration of Tylosaurus (center) with an unrealistically elongated neck and tail by Henry Worrall, 1872

The earliest depictions of Tylosaurus can be traced back to Cope's 1870 description of MCZ 4374. He suggested that Tylosaurus was an "excessively elongate reptile" because four of the back tail vertebrae of the specimen were less than a fifth in diameter than one more proximal, or closer to, the base of the tail, and there was little dimensional variation between the four back tail vertebrae. To Cope, this indicated that the enormous decrease in the size of the tail vertebrae from the base to the tip of the tail was minimal between vertebrae; thus, in order for the vertebrae in the column to approach the size of the tail vertebrae based on the observed rate of size decrease per vertebrae, plentiful amounts of vertebrae would have been needed. By measuring the proportions of the change in dimensions between the vertebrae, Cope estimated that Tylosaurus had at minimum over sixty vertebrae between the described proximal tail vertebra and a hypothetical vertebra measuring half the diameter of the four back tail vertebrae. Cope speculated that there were even more tail vertebrae ahead of the proximal vertebra, justified by the small transverse process it possessed, which would increase the vertebral count in the tail to an unknown but monstrous amount. The resulting animal became that akin to an enormous sea serpent-like reptile reaching lengths rivaling that of the largest whales. In an 1872 publication, Cope described in detail his imagination of the appearance of Tylosaurus. He depicted the head as akin to a giant flat cone supporting eyes directed partially upwards that is capable of swallowing entire prey whole like a snake, with a loose and baggy pelican-like throat to allow entry of such prey. Like a whale, one pair of paddle-like flippers was described to be present in the animal and functional hind limbs were thought to be absent. The tail was imagined as long and flat, propelling Tylosaurus forward via an anguilliform locomotion. Cope estimated that T. proriger measured at minimum 50 feet (15 m) in length. T. dyspelor was the largest species of the genus was also described as the longest of all reptiles. Its maximum length was estimated to equal that of the blue whale, (Note: Cope compared the length of T. dyspelor to that of a "great finner whale", which was the common name of the taxon Balaenoptera sibbaldii at the time. This taxon is a synonym of the modern blue whale Balaenoptera musculus.) which reaches lengths of up to nearly 30 meters (98 ft) or more. One T. dyspelor specimen with fossils relatively smaller than that of the taxon's type specimen had a skull measuring about 5 feet (1.5 m) in length; the whole animal was estimated to measure 75 feet (23 m) in total length. In 1874, Cope estimated that T. nepaeolicus was around one-third the length of T. proriger, which would translate to around 5.08 meters (16.7 ft) when using his 1872 estimates.

One of the earliest restorations of Tylosaurus comes from an illustration by a popular artist named Henry Worrall for Webb's 1872 fictional book Buffalo Land. This illustration, which is titled The sea which once covered the plains, represents one of the first paleoart of marine reptiles and pterosaurs from the Niobrara Formation. At the center of the illustration rises a giant Tylosaurus (identified as Liodon proriger). The appearance of this mosasaur was influenced by Cope, who was an acquaintance of Webb, as evidenced by its excessively elongated tail and serpentine appearance. Additionally, the Tylosaurus was given a rather long neck. Although not as long as those of plesiosaurs like Elasmosaurus, this detail would influence subsequent depictions of Tylosaurus in art. An example of this can be seen in the famous fossil collector Charles Hazelius Sternberg's 1889 fictional narrative The Young Fossil Hunters: A True Story of Western Exploration and Adventure, which contains a scene where a giant Tylosaurus skeleton measuring 80 feet (24 m) in total length with a long and slender neck that is 20 feet (6.1 m) long is uncovered.

=== Increased understanding and complete skeletons ===
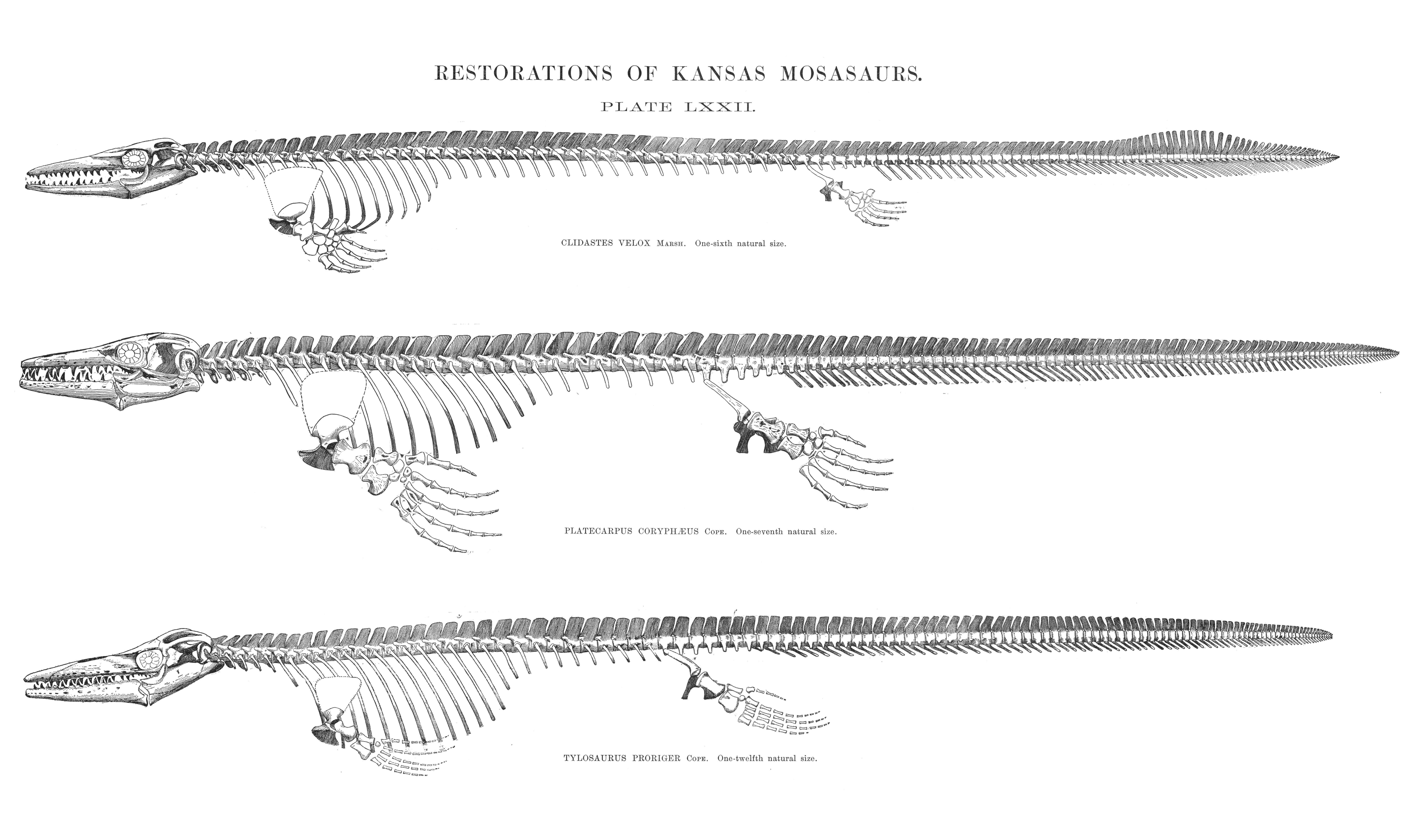
Figure from Williston's 1898 paper showing the first correct skeletal reconstruction of Tylosaurus (bottom)

Paleontologists began to understand Tylosaurus as scientists do today beginning with Samuel Wendell Williston's 1898 publication of a comprehensive study of the skeletal anatomy of Kansas mosasaurs, which among many things corrected many of the erroneous beliefs held by earlier paleontologists about Tylosaurus. A central component of the publication was a rigorous skeletal reconstruction of T. proriger, which was drawn by paleoartist Sydney Prentice under Williston's instructions. This reconstruction was almost entirely informed by three specimens in the collections of the University of Kansas Natural History Museum, but they nevertheless provided enough material to represent nearly an entire skeleton. These three specimens include one consisting of a posterior fragment of the skull and an "absolute complete series of vertebrae, connected from head to tip of tail" collected in an unspecified date by a fossil collector named Elias Putnam West (KUVP 1048); one containing a complete skull and cervical vertebrae collected in 1898 by colleague Handel T. Martin (KUVP 28705); and one collected in 1877 by university chancellor Francis H. Snow that contains a near-complete set of front paddles along with some ribs, vertebrae, and shoulder girdles (KUVP 1075). Various additional Tylosaurus specimens informed minor missing body parts such as the hind limbs. The resulting animal was correctly depicted as a four-flipper reptile with a short neck and a tail making up around half the body length. Rather unrealistically, the vertebral column was drawn straight and lacking in structural curves that Tylosaurus would have possessed in life. Commenting on this problem, Everhart noted that Williston was already aware of the curvature of the mosasaur's spinal column and suggested that he would have insisted to draw it as straight in order to save space on the plate in which the reconstruction was published on. Nevertheless, apart from the straight spine, Williston's century-old skeletal reconstruction of T. proriger is still considered accurate by modern standards, and adaptations of the skeleton remain in use by paleontologists and museum workers. In his own interpretation of the available fossil evidence, Williston proposed that Tylosaurus grew no larger than 35 feet (11 m) in length and lived as a highly mobile predator "at the expense of strength" that was best adapted for preying on small fish and occasionally an "animal of their own kind". In a review of the taxonomy of the Tylosaurus genus, Williston (1898) expressed doubt regarding the validity of T. micromus and T. nepaeolicus and went as far as to suggest the latter species was merely a juvenile representative of T. proriger. He also remarked that there exist little anatomical differences between T. proriger and T. dyspelor; the only real distinction between the two species being in size.

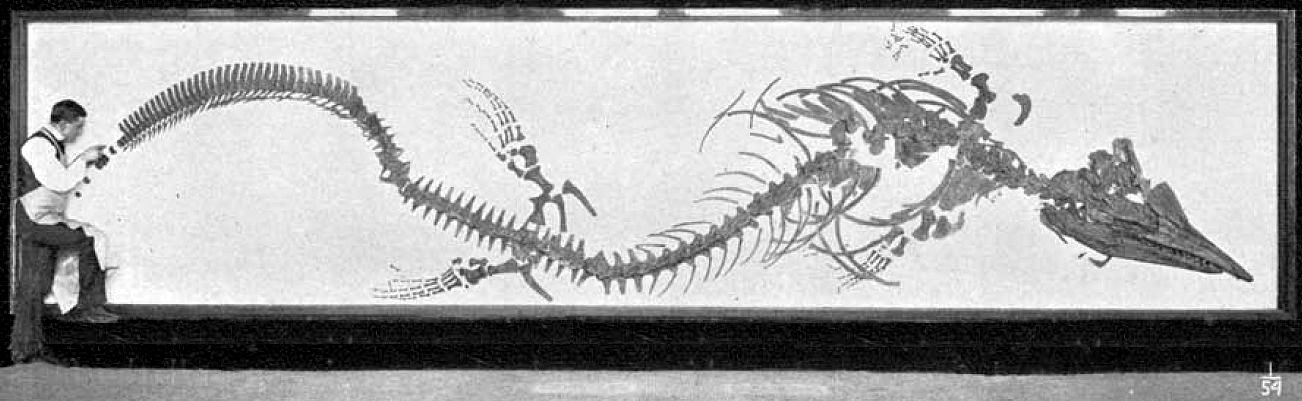
Photograph of complete skeleton

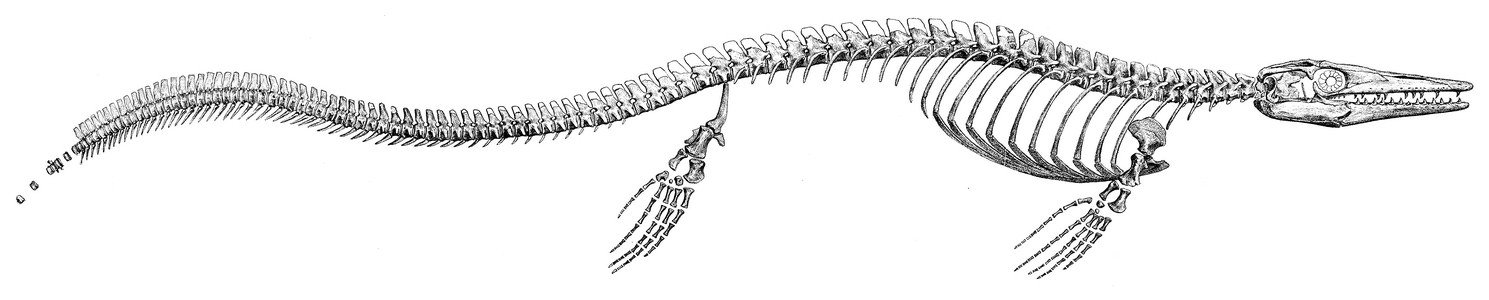
Skeletal reconstruction by Osborn (1899)

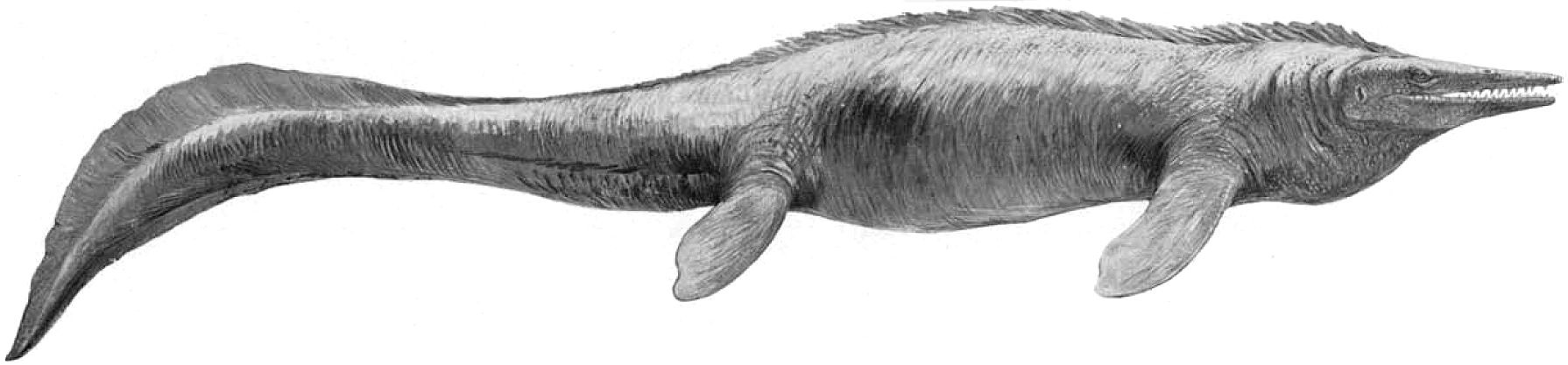
1899 restoration by Charles R. Knight, with dorsal fringe and single-lobed tail

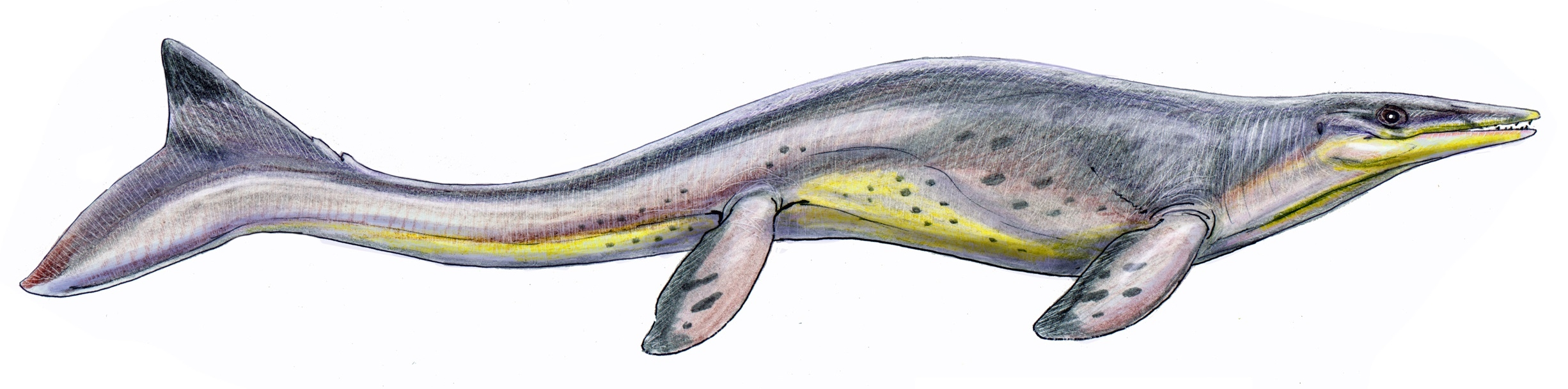
2015 restoration with bilobed tail

T. proriger specimen AMNH FR 221 and developments in its restoration

In 1899, Henry Fairfield Osborn described the first complete skeleton of Tylosaurus, a specimen measuring 8.83 meters (29.0 ft) long that resides in the American Museum of Natural History as AMNH FR 221. Discovered in Kansas by a local named W. O. Bourne and initially identified as T. dyspelor, the fossil has been considered remarkable in that it contained not only every bone apart from a few in the tail's tip, but also had exceptional preservation of the animal's soft tissue, including the larynx, trachea, bronchi, and cartilage in the throat, chest, and shoulders. This was due to calcification, a condition in a calcium-rich environment like the Kansas chalk that causes soft tissue to harden, allowing it to better fossilize. The completeness of AMNH FR 221 allowed Osborn to accurately measure the proportions of each body part; these ratios remain in use by modern paleontologists when extrapolating Tylosaurus fossils. Osborn (1899) included a life impression of AMNH FR 221 by paleoartist Charles R. Knight. The restoration carried a number of erroneous features, such as a baggy throat, bloated belly, and inaccurate paddles and dorsal fin. But a seminal feature was the addition of a dorsal crest (known as a fringe) lining the mosasaur's back. This was based on another 1898 description of a mosasaur fossil by Williston that erroneously identified tracheal rings as remains of a dorsal fringe, which he corrected in 1902. Knight updated his Tylosaurus restorations with the dorsal fringes removed to reflect this correction. However, his original depiction of a fringe was picked up as a meme, and many subsequent illustrations of the mosasaur continued to portray this inaccuracy.

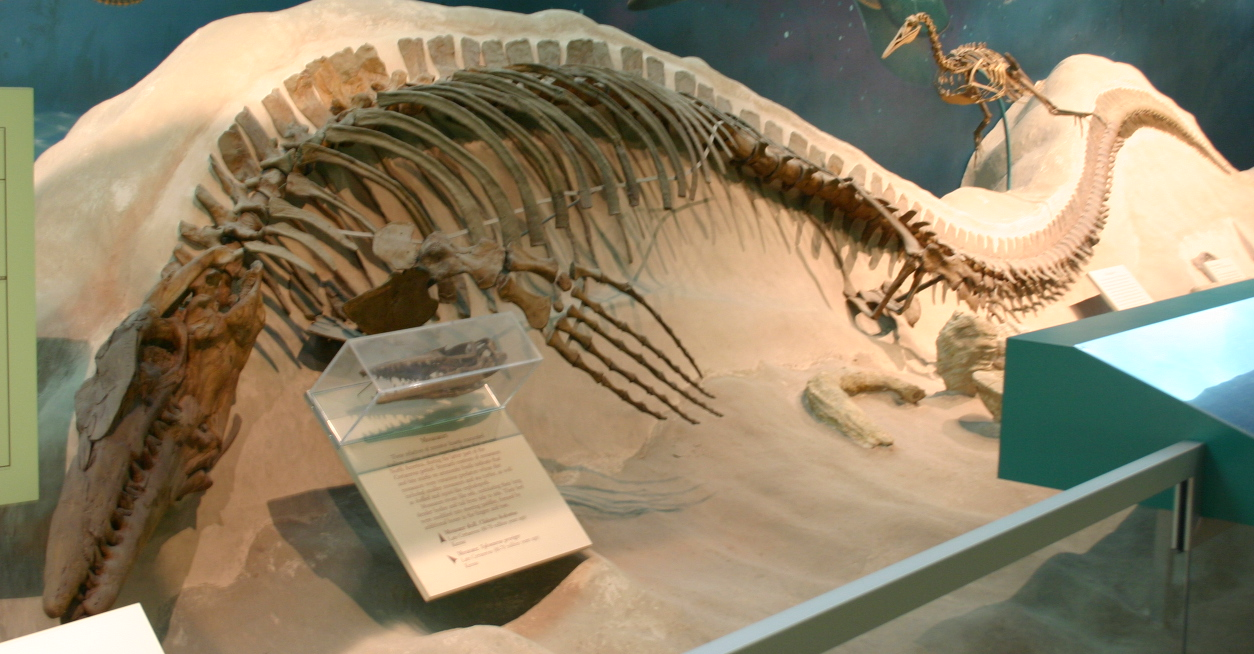
USNM 8898, a T. proriger skeleton which was found with plesiosaur remains in its stomach

Additional largely complete skeletons of T. proriger and T. dyspelor were uncovered from the Niobrara Formation between the 1900s to 1920s by Charles Sternberg and his son George, which were sold to museums in the United States and Germany. A particular find was a T. proriger skeleton collected by C. Sternberg from Smoky Hill Chalk deposits in Logan County, Kansas, in 1917, which contained digested remains of a plesiosaur within its ribcage. The specimen was sold the following year to the Smithsonian, and the mosasaur has been permanently displayed as USNM 8898. The plesiosaur remains, despite their significance, were stashed as a separate specimen and promptly forgotten until their redescription by Everhart in 2004. This rediscovery formed the basis for the plot of the 2007 National Geographic film Sea Monsters: A Prehistoric Adventure. George Sternberg attempted to sell another complete T. proriger skeleton he found to the Smithsonian 1926, but the museum was satisfied with his father's earlier specimen and declined the offer. This skeleton was ultimately transferred to the Sternberg Museum as FHSM VP-3.

In his landmark 1967 work Systematics and Morphology of American Mosasaurs, Russell performed a complete review and redescription of Tylosaurus. In a taxonomic examination, Russell found little justification for recognizing the validity of T. dyspelor and declared it a nomem vanum, along with recognizing T. micromus as a junior synonym of T. proriger. Many of the complete skeletons formerly assigned to the former taxon were reassigned to the type species. T. nepaeolicus was affirmed as a distinct species. Russell (1967) provided extensive diagnoses of Tylosaurus that are still used by scientists today, and Everhart remarked that the work "remains the single best reference regarding the skeletons of the various mosasaur genera" like Tylosaurus. In 2026, Amelia R. Zietlow, Everhart, and Michael J. Polcyn redescribed the holotype specimens of T. proriger and T. nepaeolicus, more than 150 years after their original description by Cope. In doing so, they reexamined both specimens firsthand, revised the diagnoses of both species, and reassessed several anatomical features considered to be diagnostic.

=== Additional species ===
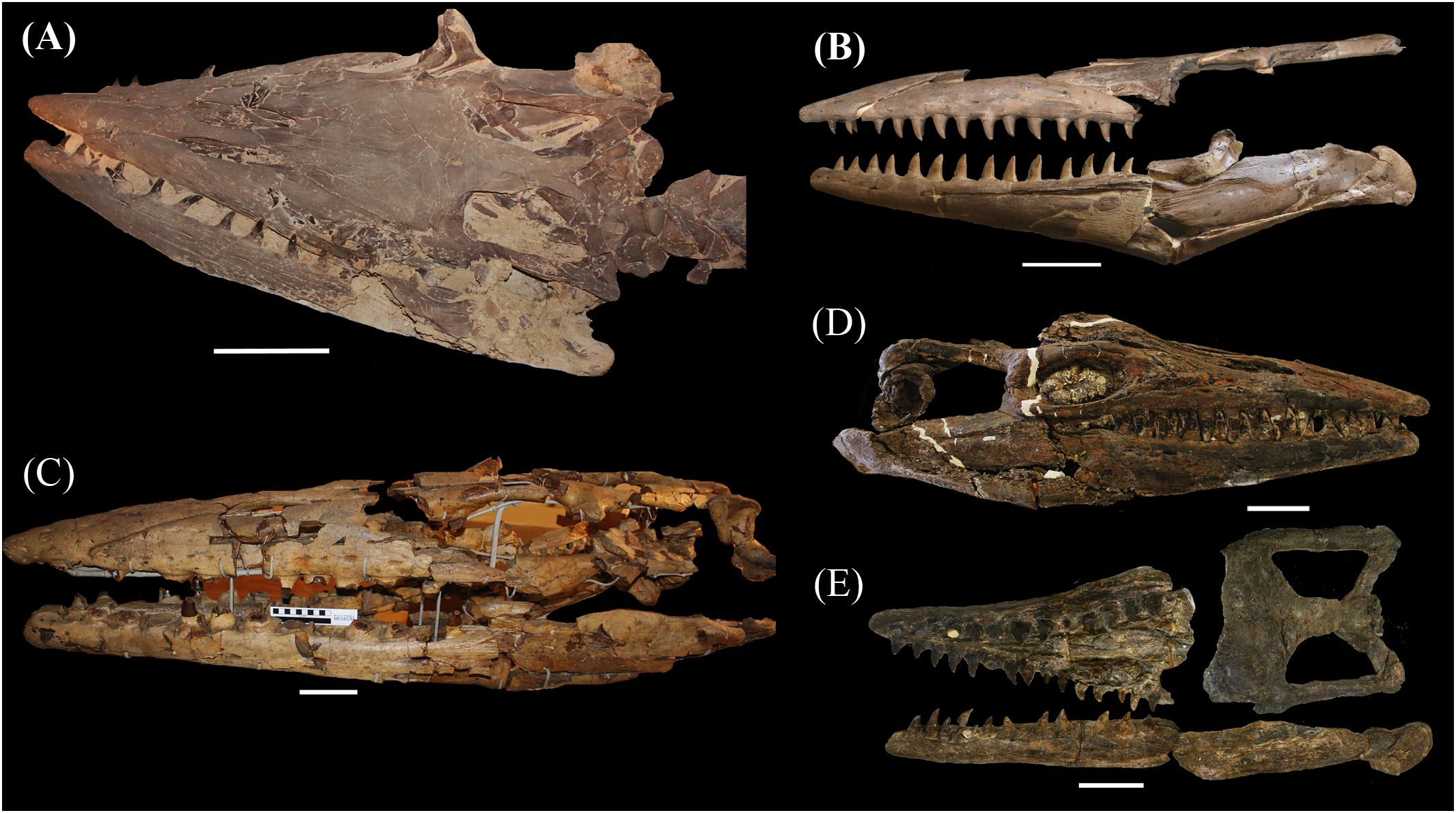
Fossil skulls of Tylosaurus species (A) T. proriger, (B) T. nepaeolicus, (C) T. bernardi, (D) T. saskatchewanensis, and (E) T. pembinensis

By Russell (1967), the only recognized valid species of Tylosaurus were T. proriger and T. nepaeolicus. However, throughout the 19th and 20th centuries, numerous species of mosasaurs were described from around the world that are now recognized within the genus Tylosaurus. These additional species were identified as different genera during their times of discovery and it was not until the early 21st century when they were reclassified as Tylosaurus.

==== T. bernardi ====
In 1885, Louis Dollo described the genus Hainosaurus from a near-complete but poorly preserved skeleton excavated from a phosphate quarry in the Ciply Basin of Mesvin, Belgium. The fossil was initially discovered as eight vertebrae by a worker in the January of the same year, who sold them to the Royal Belgian Institute of Natural Sciences. Based on information about the circumstances and locality of the discovery given the museum, it was recognized that the rest of the skeleton may have remained intact. In February, excavations were made under the authorization of an industrialist named Leopold Bernard, who managed the quarry the fossil resided in. The rest of the skeleton was recovered after a month of excavating between 500–600 cubic meters (650–780 cu yd) of phosphate, although a section of the tail was found to have been destroyed by erosion from an overlying deposit. The skeleton went to the museum, which was subsequently studied by Dollo, who recognized that it belonged to a new type of mosasaur. By instruction of the museum, he named it Hainosaurus bernardi. The prefix Haino- in the generic name refers to the Haine, a river located nearby the Ciply Basin, and thus combined with σαῦρος means "lizard from the Haine"; Dollo wrote that this was erected specifically to complement the etymology of Mosasaurus, which was similarly named in reference to a river near its type locality. The specific epithet bernardi was in recognition of Bernard, who made the excavation of the skeleton possible. The skeleton is now on display at the Royal Belgian Institute under the catalog number IRSNB R23.

==== T. pembinensis ====
A second species historically pertained to Hainosaurus was described by in 1988 by Elizabeth Nicholls based on a partial skeleton consisting of a partial skull, lower jaw, a near-complete vertebral column, and some limb bones recovered from the Pembina Member of the Pierre Shale in Manitoba, Canada. This skeleton resides in the Miami Museum in Miami, Manitoba cataloged as MT 2. Although Hainosaurus was previously only known in Europe, Nicholls (1988) argued that the new species differed from the more locally known Tylosaurus based on a higher count of pygal vertebrae, longer external nares, and femur longer than the humerus. The species was named H. pembinensis, the specific epithet referring to the Pembina Member the skeleton was found in.

==== Synonymy of Hainosaurus ====
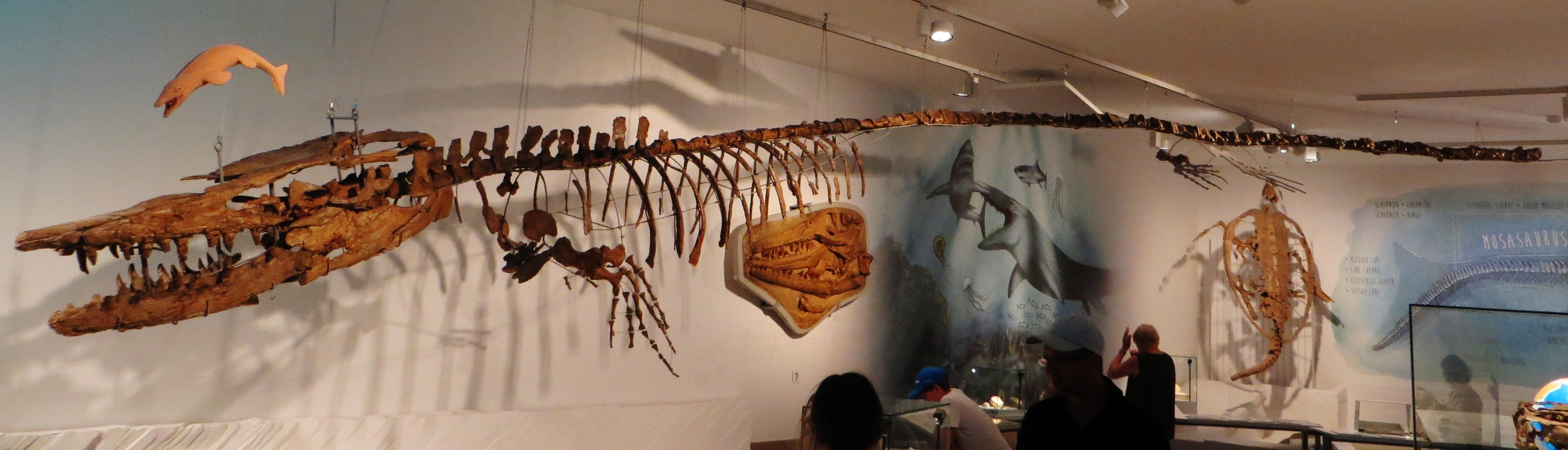
Holotype mounted skeleton of T. bernardi (IRSNB R23)

In 2005, paleontologist Johan Lindgren suspected that H. pembinensis was actually a species of Tylosaurus but stated that a better description of MT 2 was needed to be certain. In 2010, paleontologists Timon Bullard and Michael Caldwell redescribed such specimen. They argued that the pygal vertebrae reported by Nicholls (1988) actually belonged to another individual mosasaur, reducing the vertebral count in MT 2 to one that was indistinguishable with Tylosaurus. They also noted that the length of the external nares was within the known range of Tylosaurus and additionally argued that the femur being longer than the humerus was an insufficient characteristic to diagnose the species at the generic level. Based on these and other characteristics, the study found that the species cannot be referred to Hainosaurus and renamed it to T. pembinensis. With this rediagnosis, the study also noted that the only confirmed characteristic that distinguished Hainosaurus from Tylosaurus at the time was a higher count of pygal vertebrae. It was doubted as to if this would be sufficient for Hainosaurus to be a distinct genus but acknowledged that further research may provide additional characteristics. This further research was done in 2016 by Paulina Jimenez-Huidobro and Caldwell, which reexamined H. bernardi. They found that the unique characteristics of the type species are indeed insufficient to warrant a distinction between Hainosaurus and Tylosaurus and declared the former as a junior synonym of the latter, thus renaming H. bernardi to T. bernardi. However, some scientists argue that Hainosaurus should remain a distinct genus, justified by differences in tooth morphology unexplored by Jimenez-Huidobro & Caldwell (2016) such as the presence of an advanced cutting-based dentition in T. bernardi as opposed to a more general smashing-based dentition seen in other Tylosaurus species.

==== T. gaudryi ====
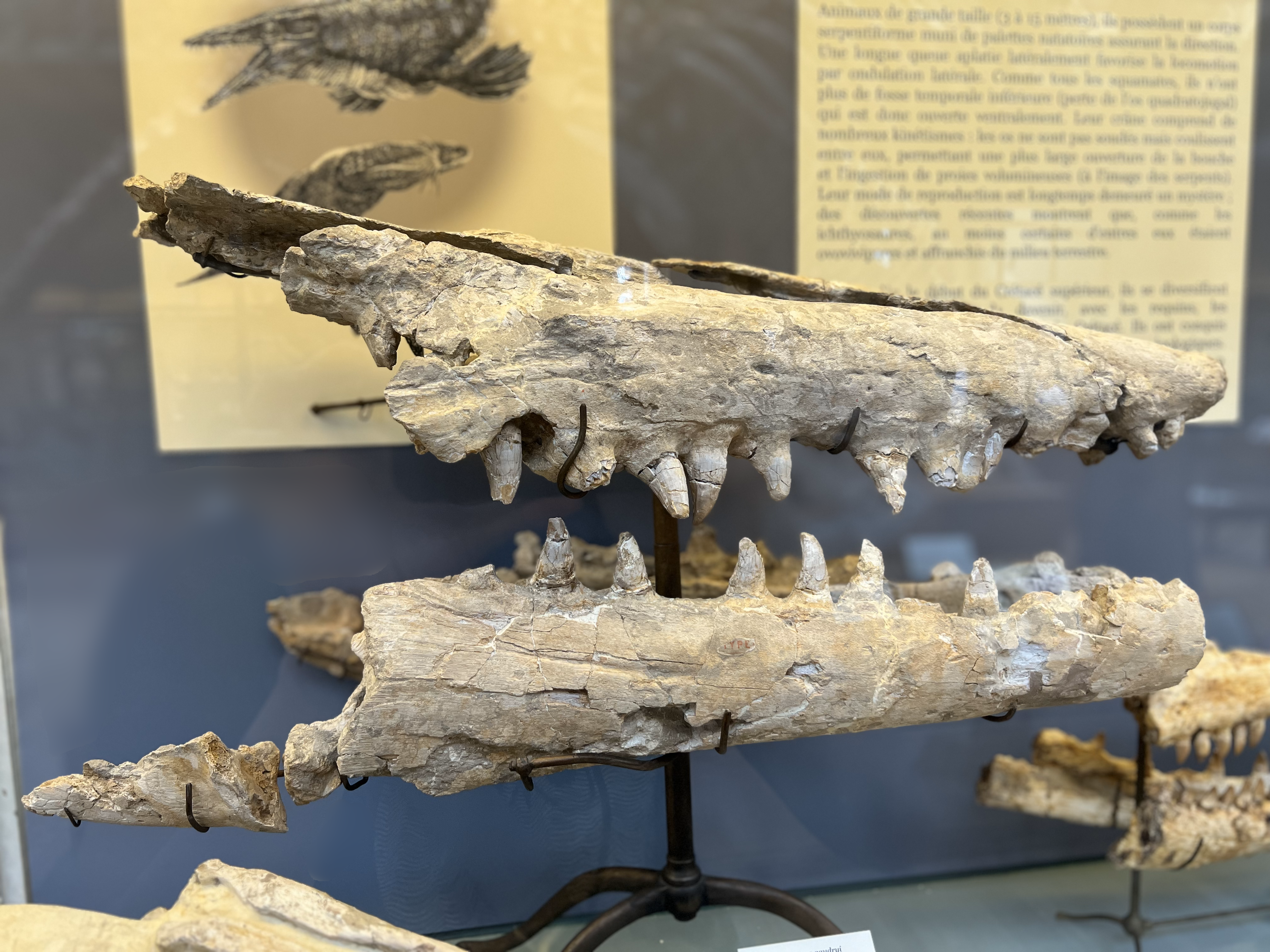
Holotype skull of T. gaudryi (MNHN 1896–15)

In 1896, paleontologist Armand Thevenin published a formal description of a poorly preserved skull consisting of the majority of the maxilla, premaxilla, and dentary bones that was found in a phosphate deposit in Eclusier-Vaux, France during an earlier unspecified date. Thevenin wrote that the skull was first described by Jean Albert Gaudry, who initially thought that it belonged to a species of Liodon. However, Dollo thought that the characteristics of skull supported an alternative placement as a species of Mosasaurus. Through correspondence with Dollo and a reexamination of the skull, Thevenin noted that the rostrum was more elongated than those found in typical Mosasaurus skulls but not as long as those in the skulls of Tylosaurus or Hainosaurus. He suggested that this represented an intermediate trait for a new species, which he subsequently named Mosasaurus gaudryi; the specific epithet recognizing Gaudry's previous work on the fossil skull. The skull is now on display at the French National Museum of Natural History as MNHN 1896–15. In 1990, paleontologist Theagarten Lingham-Soliar proposed reassignment of M. gaudryi to a possible specimen of H. bernardi based on the discovery of a double buttress supporting the suture between the premaxilla and maxilla in MNHN 1896–15, a trait he claimed that was unique to the latter species, and estimations that the rostrum may have been more elongated than preserved. This was elaborated on a publication of the same year by Nathalie Bardet of the Natural History Museum, who concluded that MNHN 1896-15 belongs to the genus Hainosaurus but as a separate species, thus changing the skull's scientific name to Hainosaurus gaudryi. This was agreed on by Lingham-Soliar in a 1992 publication. In 2005, Lindgren pointed out that the characteristics used to justify the placement in Hainosaurus, such as the double buttress, can also be found in Tylosaurus. He also noted that the dentition of MNHN 1896-15 morphologically overlaps more with T. ivoensis and T. pembinensis than H. bernardi. With these characteristics, Lindgren concluded that H. gaudryi is most certainly a species of Tylosaurus, renaming it to Tylosaurus gaudryi.

==== T. ivoensis ====
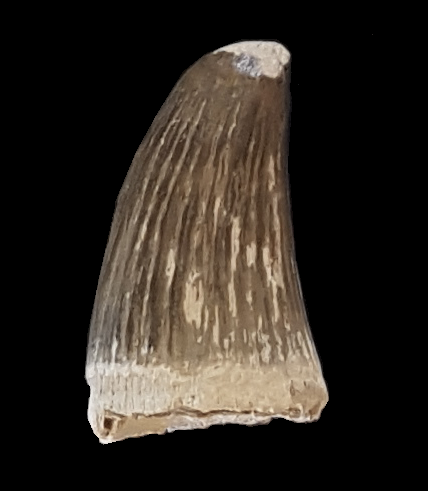
Isolated tooth of T. ivoensis

In 1963, paleontologist Per Ove Persson identified a new taxon of mosasaur based on isolated teeth from a deposit located in an area called Ivö Klack near Ivö Lake in the Kristianstad Basin in Scania, Sweden. Such teeth and various other teeth pertaining to the same taxon were recovered and described from this area numerous times in the past since 1836, but they have always been misidentified as either an ichthyosaur or Mosasaurus hoffmannii. Persson proposed that the teeth belonged to a new subspecies of M. hoffmannii and gave it the name Mosasaurus hoffmannii ivoensis, the prefix ivo- in the species name referring to Ivö Klack. Russell (1967) amended this identification by elevating the taxon to a distinct species. He also identified a mosasaur fossil from the Niobrara Formation in Kansas consisting of a partial skull, some vertebrae, and a coracoid bone as being of Mosasaurus ivoensis. In an abstract presented in 1998, Lindgren doubted if M. ivoensis was a species of Mosasaurus. He instead proposed that the species was actually of Hainosaurus. The next year in 1999, Lindgren amended this in another abstract and instead suggested that the species should be moved to Tylosaurus. In 2002, he co-authored a study with paleontologist Mikael Siversson which examined the fossils referred to the species as well as new material consisting of pterygoid teeth, partial jawbones, and some vertebrae. It was found that the Niobrara fossil identified as M. ivoensis by Russell (1967) is actually of a different species. Examinations of the Swedish teeth found possible similarities with that of Taniwhasaurus, but due to the poor representation of the genus and the sheer distance between the two taxa (Taniwhasaurus was primarily known from New Zealand at the time), it was expressed that it is unlikely that M. ivoensis belongs to it. Instead, the study concluded that the species should belong to Tylosaurus and thus renamed it Tylosaurus ivoensis. However, a 2008 study led by Caldwell discovered Taniwhasaurus in northern Japan, which was of similar latitude with Ivö Klack during the Cretaceous, and reasserted dental similarities between T. ivoensis and the genus. This opened the possibility that the species could be reassigned to Taniwhasaurus, but the authors considered this to be a topic for a different study.

==== T. iembeensis ====
In 1964, Miguel Telles Antunes described Mosasaurus iembeensis from a partial skull excavated from the Itombe Formation near the town of Iembe, Angola. The deposit was initially dated to the Turonian age but this was later revised to about 88 mya during the later Coniacian. In 1992, Lingham-Soliar argued that the features of the skull disagreed with those of Mosasaurus and were instead characteristic of Tylosaurus. He subsequently moved the species into the genus, becoming T. iembeensis. However, Lingham-Soliar did not figure the holotype skull, which he identified as residing in the collections of NOVA University Lisbon without a catalog number, and it was later reported in 2006 that the specimen may have been lost during a fire. In a 2012 multi-author study led by Octávio Mateus, it was reported that an additional T. iembeensis fossil consisting of fragmentary skull elements was recovered during an expedition to the lost holotype's locality, although the specimen was not figured or formally described.

== 21st century developments ==
=== T. kansasensis ===
Skull of FHSM VP-2295, the holotype specimen of the proposed species T. kansasensis.

In 1968, a well-preserved mosasaur specimen was discovered in an outcrop of the Niobrara Formation in northwestern Ellis County, Kansas. Since numbered as FHSM VP-2295 at the Sternberg Museum, the fossil preserves a complete skull and seven cervical vertebrae. During the 1990s, this specimen was recognized by multiple authors as possibly coming from a new species of Tylosaurus. Despite such recognition, however, no paleontologist investigated this further and the fossil remained undescribed during the remainder of the 20th century. In a 2004 meeting, Everhart suggested that the new species should finally be given a scientific name and formal description, to which paleontologist Louis L. Jacobs responded with "Well, get it done." In 2005, Everhart published a formal description of the new species represented by FHSM VP-2295. Thirteen different Tylosaurus specimens also from Kansas were identified as conspecific with FHSM VP-2295, and in reference to their shared localities the new species was given the name Tylosaurus kansasensis. However, during a 2007 meeting, Caldwell approached Everhart and suggested that his description of T. kansasensis was not adequate enough and should be readdressed in a followup paper. In 2013, Caldwell and Jiménez-Huidobro presented an abstract at the annual Society of Vertebrate Paleontology meeting casting doubt on the distinction of the species from T. nepaeolicus and in 2016 the two and paleontologist Tiago Simões published a study arguing that T. kansasensis was merely a juvenile form of T. nepaeolicus, thus making the first name a junior synonym of the second. This was criticized by Everhart, who in his 2017 book Oceans of Kansas claimed that the study was "poorly researched and written". However, he did not provide any comments on the topic, claiming that such would merely be considered "sour grapes". Nevertheless, Everhart maintained that T. kansasensis remains a distinct species "until proven otherwise". A 2018 study by Robert F. Stewart and Jordan Mallon also rejected the synonymy based on inconsistencies when comparing the ontogenetic trends of T. kansasensis and T. nepaeolicus between the better-understood T. proriger. In 2020, another ontogenetic study write by Zietlow came in support of the synonymy based on results from ontograms constructed from a cladistical analysis.

=== T. saskatchewanensis ===
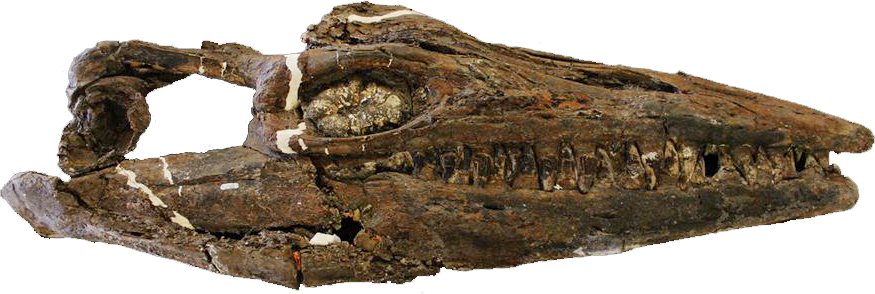
Skull of RSM P2588.1, the holotype specimen of T. saskatchewanensis

In 1995, the Royal Saskatchewan Museum excavated a partial skeleton first discovered a year prior by a local farmer from a hill located northwest of Herbert Ferry, at the Lake Diefenbaker, Saskatchewan. The specimen, originating from the Bearpaw Formation and recovered in articulation, includes a "moderately complete" skull, a largely complete vertebral column, limb bones, and remains of a smaller mosasaur as stomach content; it was curated into the museum as RSM P2588.1 and nicknamed "Omācīw" (meaning "hunter" in Cree). In 2006, Timon Bullard of the University of Alberta studied the specimen in his Master of Science thesis. At the time, the Omācīw fossil was still in preparation and Bullard was only able to examine the right side of the skull. However, he identified that the fossil represented a new species of Tylosaurus and suggested that it be named Tylosaurus saskatchewanensis in reference to the original province of its discovery. Bullard's thesis was never published but subsequently published studies recognized T. saskatchewanensis as a valid species despite technically never having been formally described. In 2018, Bullard co-authored a multi-author study led by Jiménez-Huidobro which formally described Omācīw, which by then was more fully prepared, and confirmed its identity as a distinct species. The following year, Jiménez-Huidobro and Caldwell noted that the now dubious species T. neumilleri shows strong anatomical similarities with T. saskatchewanensis and T. pembinensis. Based on this observation, Zietlow, Polcyn, and Ronald S. Tykoski subsequently suggested that the former two species could eventually be recognised as junior synonyms of T. pembinensis according to the ICZN's principle of priority.

=== T. 'borealis' ===
In 2020, the MS thesis of Samuel Garvey of the University of Cincinnati was published. The thesis focused on TMP 2014.011.0001, a Tylosaurus fossil in the collections of the Royal Tyrrell Museum consisting of a partial snout and a fragment of the right mandible. The specimen was found around 55 kilometers (34 mi) northeast of Grande Prairie, Alberta, within the fossil deposits of the Puskwaskau Formation. During the Cretaceous, this locality was located at around 62°N, making the fossil the northernmost known occurrence of Tylosaurus and one of the few known occasions of a mosasaur existing in boreal climates. Moreover, the morphology of TMP 2014.011.0001 was recognized as very distinct from other Tylosaurus species. For example, it exhibited paedomorphosis in its teeth, which were slender and designed for piercing prey (contrary to the more robust cutting-specialized teeth of typical Tylosaurus species), a trait likely retained from juveniles. The uniqueness of the specimen led to the conclusion that it was a new species, which Garvey subsequently proposed that it be named Tylosaurus borealis in reference to its northernly occurrence.

=== T. rex ===
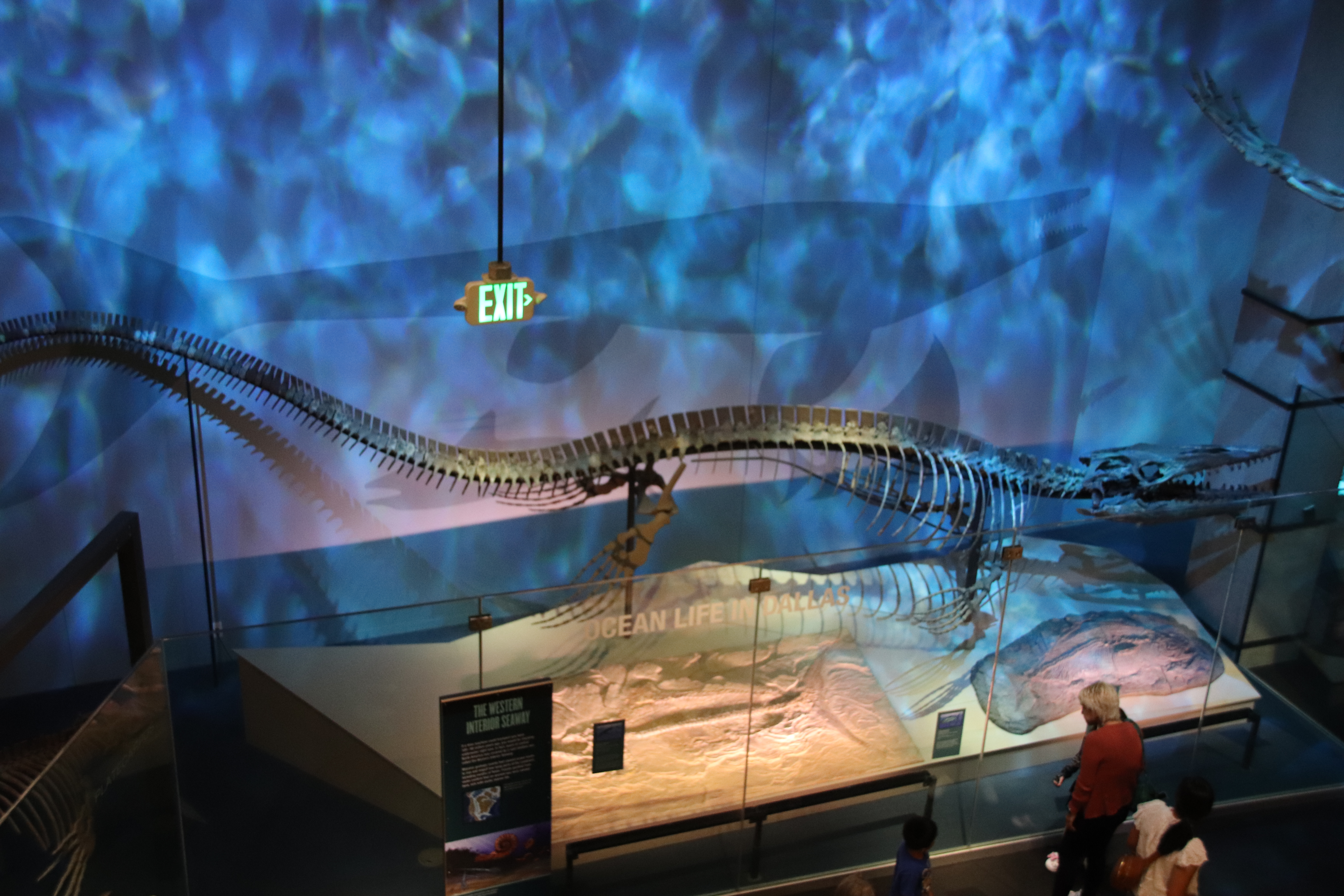
PMNS 8029, the holotype specimen of T. rex.

In 2026, Zietlow, Michael J. Polcyn and Ronald S. Tykoski described the species T. rex based on numerous more or less complete fossil specimens discovered in the fossil record of Texas and Kansas, previously attributed to T. proriger. The holotype consists of a partial skeleton notably preserving a complete skull, discovered in the fall of 1979 by the Newman family while boating along the eastern shoreline of Lake Ray Hubbard, an artificial reservoir east of Dallas. The fossil was later recovered by the Dallas Museum of Natural History, now known as the Perot Museum of Nature and Science, where it is since catalogued as PMNS 8029. The specimen was long informally nicknamed as the "Heath mosasaur", in reference to the city of the same name within whose boundaries it was discovered. Its exact stratigraphic position remains uncertain, but its locality indicates that it originated from the Wolfe City Formation. More precise information regarding the discovery site is preserved in the archives of the museum housing the specimen today. The specific epithet rex, meaning "king" in Latin, is an homage to a passage from a letter written by John T. Thurmond to Barnum Brown in 1967. In this correspondence, Thurmond already suggested that Tylosaurus specimens from the middle Campanian of northeastern Texas could represent a new species distinct from T. dyspelor (now synonymised with T. proriger), which he informally referred to as T. thalassotyrannus because of its gigantic size. According to the describing authors, the name rex is also justified by the animal's massive skull, large serrated teeth, and extensive muscle attachment areas around the jaws and neck, features underscoring its role as an apex predator.
