= Pecan Gap, Texas =

- City
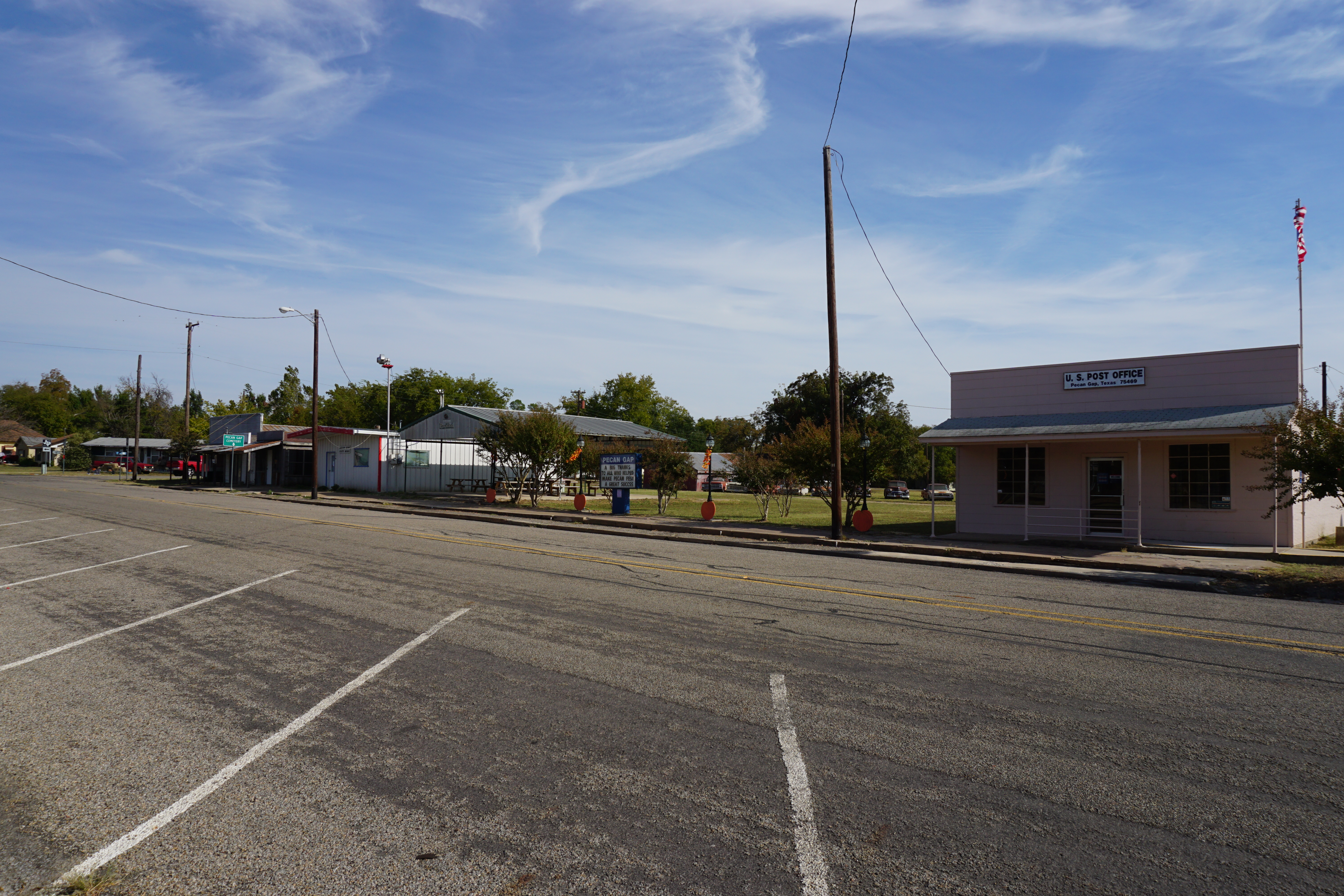
- 3rd Street in Pecan Gap
- Nickname: The Gap
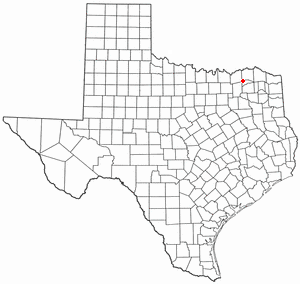
- Location of Pecan Gap, Texas

- Coordinates: 33°26′18″N 95°51′07″W
- Country: United States
- State: Texas
- Counties: Delta, Fannin
- Settled: 1884
- Named for: Nearby pecan grove

Area
  - Total: 0.63 sq mi (1.64 km^{2})
  - Land: 0.63 sq mi (1.62 km^{2})
  - Water: 0.0077 sq mi (0.02 km^{2})
- Elevation: 568 ft (173 m)

Population (2020)
  - Total: 178
  - Density: 314.19/sq mi (121.31/km^{2})
- Time zone: UTC-6 (Central (CST))
  - Summer (DST): UTC-5 (CDT)
- ZIP code: 75469
- Area codes: 903, 430
- FIPS code: 48-56468
- GNIS feature ID: 2411394

Pecan Gap is a city in Delta and Fannin counties within the U.S. state of Texas. It is sometimes informally referred to as "The Gap" by area residents. The population was 178 at the time of the 2020 census. It is named for the gap between two pecan trees, but one of the two pecan trees was destroyed by a tornado in 1963.

== History ==
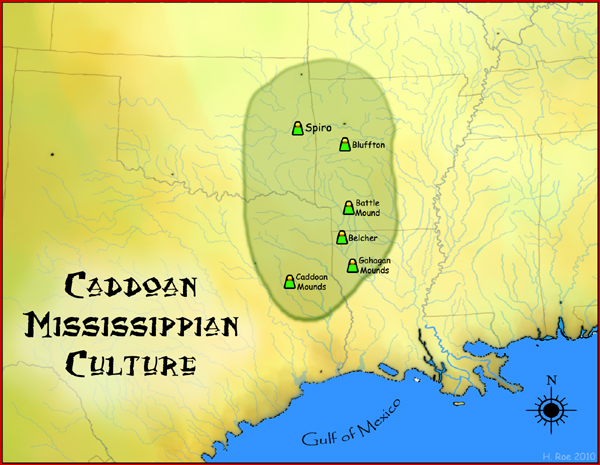
The site of Cooper was near the westernmost edge of Caddo civilization.

The first inhabitants of the area that is now Pecan Gap were the Caddo people, who settled large portions of eastern Texas as early as 800 AD. The Caddo were highly advanced, living in large wooden structures, and were skilled farmers. The first European to visit the area was French explorer François Hervey, around 1750. A few decades afterwards, European disease and attacks from neighboring tribes as well as attacks from European settlers forced the Caddo out of the area around Pecan Gap. Around 1820, Delaware, Quapaw, and Seminole tribes began settling in the area. In 1836, the Republic of Texas officially recognized the region around Pecan Gap as part of Red River County. In 1840, Lamar County was formed, which absorbed much of the area just south of Pecan Gap. However, just six years later, the region was designated as part of the newly formed Hopkins County. In 1870 Delta County was created. As Pecan Gap grew it expanded west into Fannin County.

== Geography ==
Pecan Gap is located at the junction of Farm to Market Roads 64 and 128.

Pecan Gap is one of just two incorporated communities in Delta County. The city is the second largest in the county, population-wise, behind Cooper. According to statistics from the Census Bureau, the city covers a total area of 0.63 square miles (1.64 km^{2}), of which 0.01 square miles (0.02 km^{2}), or 1.13%, is water.

Pecan Gap, as well as most of Delta County, is located in the Texas blackland prairies region, a flat, tallgrass prairie ecosystem that covers a large portion of north-central Texas. The region's elevation rarely varies from around 400 to 500 feet (120 to 150 m). The area's geology consists mainly of deep clay, or clay mixed with a dark-colored loam. However, the county is also known to have high-quality topsoil, ideal for crop growing. A specific layer of the soil in the region is known as Pecan Gap Chalk, named for the city when it was discovered nearby in 1918. The layer is a blue-gray, sandy chalk substance, which is fossil-rich and is located in much of the Pecan Gap vicinity.

Under the Köppen climate classification, Pecan Gap is located in zone Cfa, which experiences warm, wet summers and a humid subtropical climate. Temperatures in Pecan Gap are generally high, with the average in January being 42 °F (6 °C) and in July being 82 °F (28 °C). The highest recorded temperature for Pecan Gap was 115 °F (46 °C) in July 1936, while the lowest recorded temperature was −5 °F (−21 °C) in January 1930. On average, the hottest month of the year is August, when temperatures stay around an average of 82 °F (28 °C). January is generally the coolest month, when the average temperature is around 42 °F (6 °C). The community receives low precipitation, with the average monthly high being around 5.5 inches (140 mm) in May and June. August is the driest month for the city, when it receives an average of just 2 inches (51 mm) of rain.

== Demographics ==
Historical population
Census	Pop.	Note	%±
1940	409		—
1950	319		−22.0%
1960	278		−12.9%
1970	291		4.7%
1980	250		−14.1%
1990	245		−2.0%
2000	214		−12.7%
2010	203		−5.1%
2020	178		−12.3%
U.S. Decennial Census; 1940-2010

=== 2020 census ===
As of the 2020 census, Pecan Gap had a population of 178. The median age was 55.0 years. 14.0% of residents were under the age of 18 and 37.6% of residents were 65 years of age or older. For every 100 females there were 114.5 males, and for every 100 females age 18 and over there were 98.7 males age 18 and over.

There were 76 households in Pecan Gap, of which 25.0% had children under the age of 18 living in them. Of all households, 42.1% were married-couple households, 22.4% were households with a male householder and no spouse or partner present, and 26.3% were households with a female householder and no spouse or partner present. About 27.6% of all households were made up of individuals and 18.5% had someone living alone who was 65 years of age or older.

There were 100 housing units, of which 24.0% were vacant. The homeowner vacancy rate was 0.0% and the rental vacancy rate was 15.4%.

0.0% of residents lived in urban areas, while 100.0% lived in rural areas.

Racial composition as of the 2020 census
Race	Number	Percent
White	149	83.7%
Black or African American	6	3.4%
American Indian and Alaska Native	1	0.6%
Asian	0	0.0%
Native Hawaiian and Other Pacific Islander	0	0.0%
Some other race	6	3.4%
Two or more races	16	9.0%
Hispanic or Latino (of any race)	7	3.9%

=== 2000 census ===
At the 2000 census, 214 people, 103 households, and 57 families resided in the city. The population density was 343.6 inhabitants per square mile (132.7/km^{2}). There were 123 housing units averaged 197.5 per square mile (76.6/km^{2}). The racial makeup of the city was 88.32% White, 7.94% African American, 0.47% Asian, 2.80% from other races, and 0.47% from two or more races. Hispanics or Latinos of any race were 6.54% of the population.

Of the 103 households, 20.4% had children under the age of 18 living with them, 40.8% were married couples living together, 12.6% had a female householder with no husband present, and 43.7% were not families. About 40.8% of all households were made up of individuals, and 17.5% had someone living alone who was 65 years of age or older. The average household size was 2.08 and the average family size was 2.78.

In the city, the population was distributed as 19.6% under the age of 18, 6.5% from 18 to 24, 31.8% from 25 to 44, 22.9% from 45 to 64, and 19.2% who were 65 years of age or older. The median age was 41 years. For every 100 females, there were 98.1 males. For every 100 females age 18 and over, there were 97.7 males.

The median income for a household in the city was $31,389, and for a family was $43,125. Males had a median income of $38,000 versus $22,000 for females. The per capita income for the city was $16,704. About 16.7% of families and 19.0% of the population were below the poverty line, including 18.4% of those under the age of 18 and 25.0% of those 65 or over.

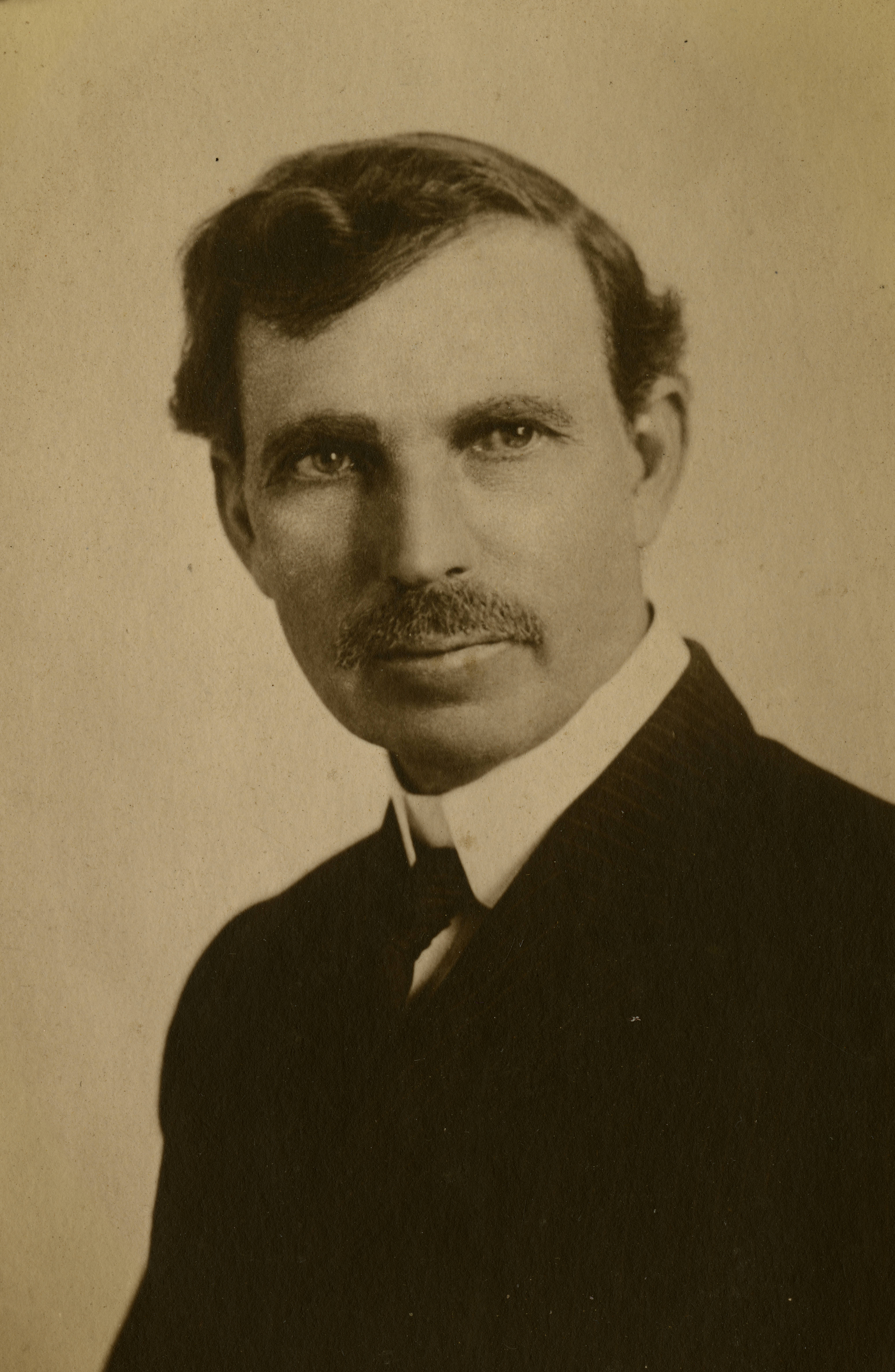
W.L. Mayo helped establish the elementary school in Pecan Gap.

== Pecan Festival ==
Held annually on the second Saturday of October, a local event known as the Pecan Festival (or simply "Pecan Fest") takes place. It is organized by the Pecan Gap Ladies Club and features various attractions such as a parade, pet show, lawnmower races, food and drinks, and a gift shop open only during the event.

== Education ==
Pecan Gap is served by the Fannindel Independent School District.
