= Taylor Group =

Geologic group in Texas and Arkansas

- Stratigraphic range: Cretaceous
- Type: Group
- Sub-units: Upper Taylor, Lower Taylor, Wolfe City Formation, Pecan Gap Chalk

Location
- Region: Texas and Arkansas
- Country: United States

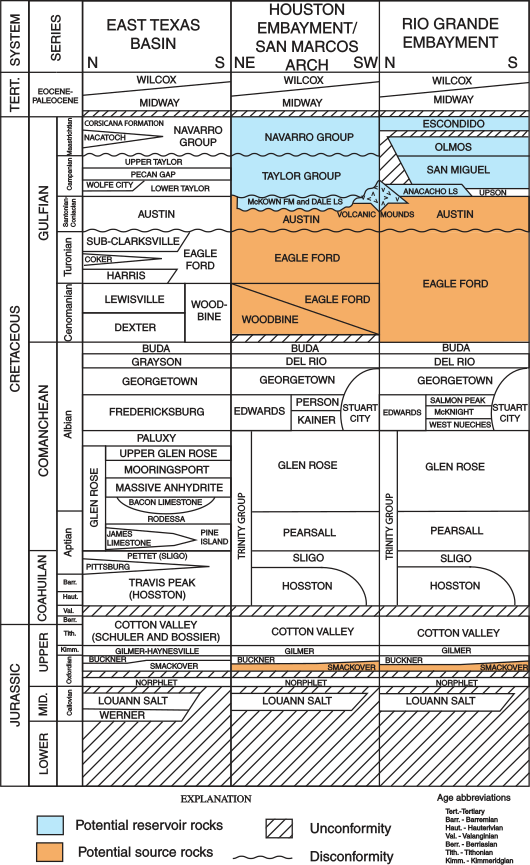
Taylor Group stratigraphic column in Texas

The Taylor Group is a geologic group in Texas and Arkansas. It preserves fossils dating back to the Cretaceous period.

== See also ==
- List of fossiliferous stratigraphic units in Arkansas
- List of fossiliferous stratigraphic units in Texas
- Paleontology in Arkansas
- Paleontology in Texas
