= Wolfe City Formation =

Geologic formation in Texas, United States

- Stratigraphic range: Campanian
- Type: Formation
- Unit of: Taylor Group

Location
- Region: Texas
- Country: United States

The Wolfe City Formation is a geologic formation in Texas. It preserves fossils dating back to the Cretaceous period. The holotype specimen of the large mosasaur Tylosaurus rex is known from this formation.

== See also ==
- List of fossiliferous stratigraphic units in Texas
- Paleontology in Texas
