= Commerce School District =

Commerce School District may refer to:

- Commerce Public Schools (Oklahoma)
- Commerce Independent School District (Texas)
