= Justin Rogers (linebacker) =

American football player (born 1983)

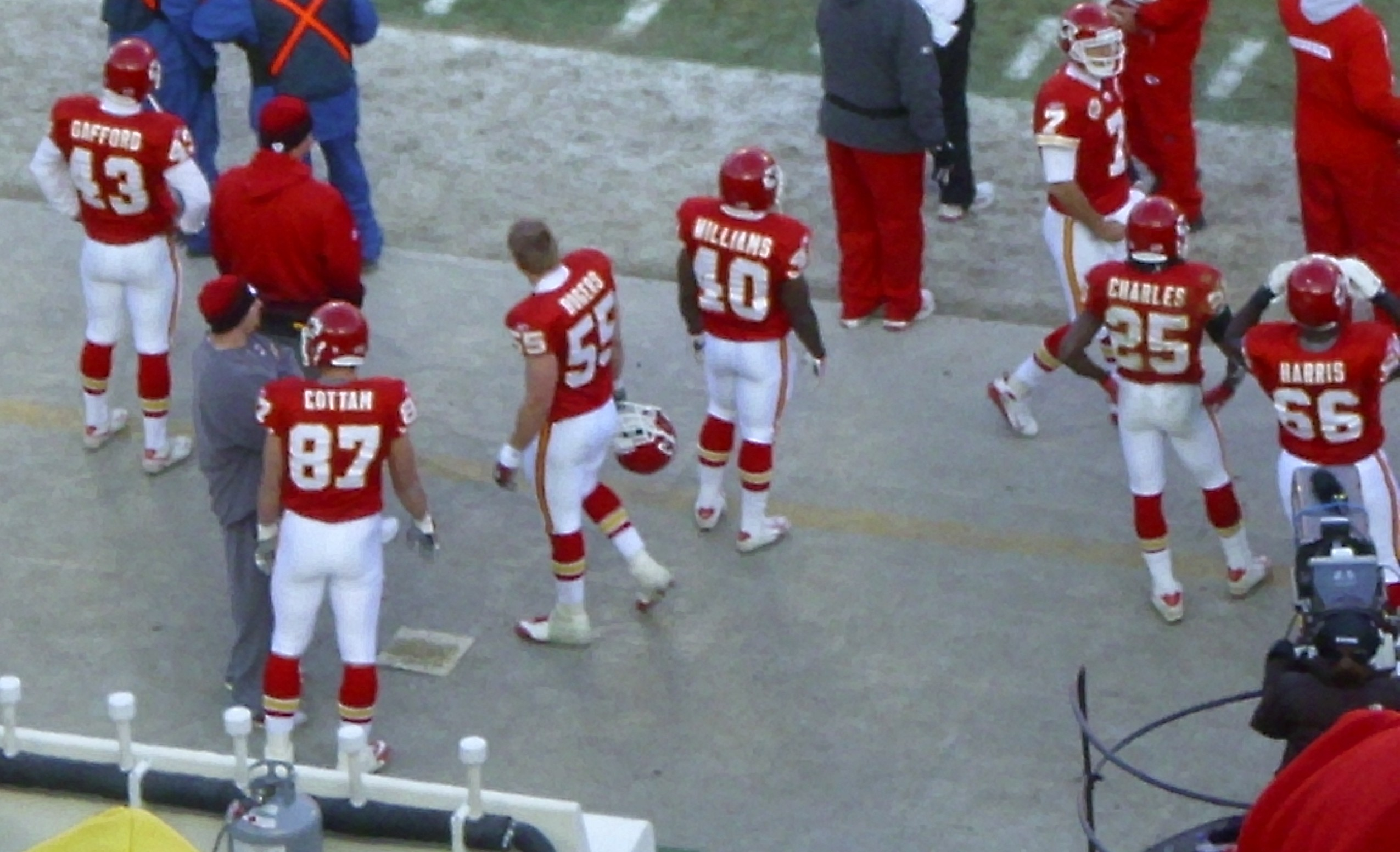
- Rogers (#55) on the sidelines

No. 50, 55
- Position: Linebacker

Personal information
- Born: August 31, 1983 (age 43); Penngrove, California, U.S.
- Listed height: 6 ft 3 in (1.91 m)
- Listed weight: 252 lb (114 kg)

Career information
- High school: Commerce (Commerce, Texas)
- College: SMU
- NFL draft: 2007: 6th round, 180th overall pick

Career history
- New England Patriots (2007)*; Dallas Cowboys (2007–2008); Kansas City Chiefs (2009)
- * Offseason or practice squad member only

Awards and highlights
- First-team All-C-USA (2006); Second-team All-C-USA (2005)

Career NFL statistics
- Total tackles: 35
- Stats at Pro Football Reference

Justin Rogers (born August 31, 1983) is an American former professional football player who was a linebacker in the National Football League (NFL). He was selected in the sixth round of the 2007 NFL draft, and was a member of the New England Patriots, Dallas Cowboys, and Kansas City Chiefs. He played college football for the SMU Mustangs.

== Early life ==
Rogers grew up in Commerce, Texas, and attended Commerce High School. He was a two-time All-district selection. He contributed to the team winning the 3A state championship in 1999 and 2001.

He also practiced baseball, basketball and track. He was an All-district selection in baseball as a senior.

== College career ==
Rogers accepted a football scholarship from Southern Methodist University. As a redshirt freshman, he appeared in all 12 games (2 starts) as a backup defensive end, making 34 tackles.

As a sophomore, he started 9 games at defensive end, registering 27 tackles (5.5 for loss) and tying the team lead with 2.5 sacks.

As a junior, he led the conference in sacks (7) and ranked in the top 10 in tackles-for-loss and forced fumbles. He posted 64 tackles (10.5 for loss) and 3 forced fumbles.

His senior season was cut short with a neck injury, but he still was able to lead the team with 9.5 sacks. He also had 59 tackles (15 for loss).

Rogers finished his college career after starting 33 out of 43 games, while recording 184 tackles (32 for loss), 19.5 sacks (second in school history), 5 forced fumbles, and one blocked kick.

== Professional career ==
Pre-draft measurables
Height	Weight	40-yard dash	10-yard split	20-yard split	20-yard shuttle	Three-cone drill	Vertical jump	Broad jump	Bench press
6 ft 3 1/8 in (1.91 m)	252 lb (114 kg)	4.76 s	1.58 s	2.69 s	4.28 s	7.32 s	34.0 in (0.86 m)	9 ft 9 in (2.97 m)	19 reps
All values from Pro Day

=== New England Patriots ===
Rogers was selected by the New England Patriots in the sixth round (180th overall) of the 2007 NFL draft, with the intention of converting him into an outside linebacker. He became the first Mustang drafted by an NFL team since Kevin Garrett in 2003. He was waived by the Patriots during final cuts on September 1.

=== Dallas Cowboys ===
On September 2, 2007, he was claimed off waivers by the Dallas Cowboys. He played in all 16 games primarily on special teams. He finished the season with 16 special teams tackles (fifth on the team) as well as three tackles on defense.

In 2008, Rogers played in 15 games, finishing third on the team with 18 special teams tackles.

He missed time in the 2009 training camp with tendinitis in his knee. On August 2, he was waived/injured and subsequently reverted to the injured reserve list. He was released on August 27.

=== Kansas City Chiefs ===
On October 14, 2009, he was signed by the Kansas City Chiefs. He was waived three days later, and re-signed on October 20. He appeared in one game and was declared inactive in five games. He was placed on the injured reserve list with a thigh injury on December 26. He was waived on February 8, 2010.
