= Neylandville, Texas =

- Town
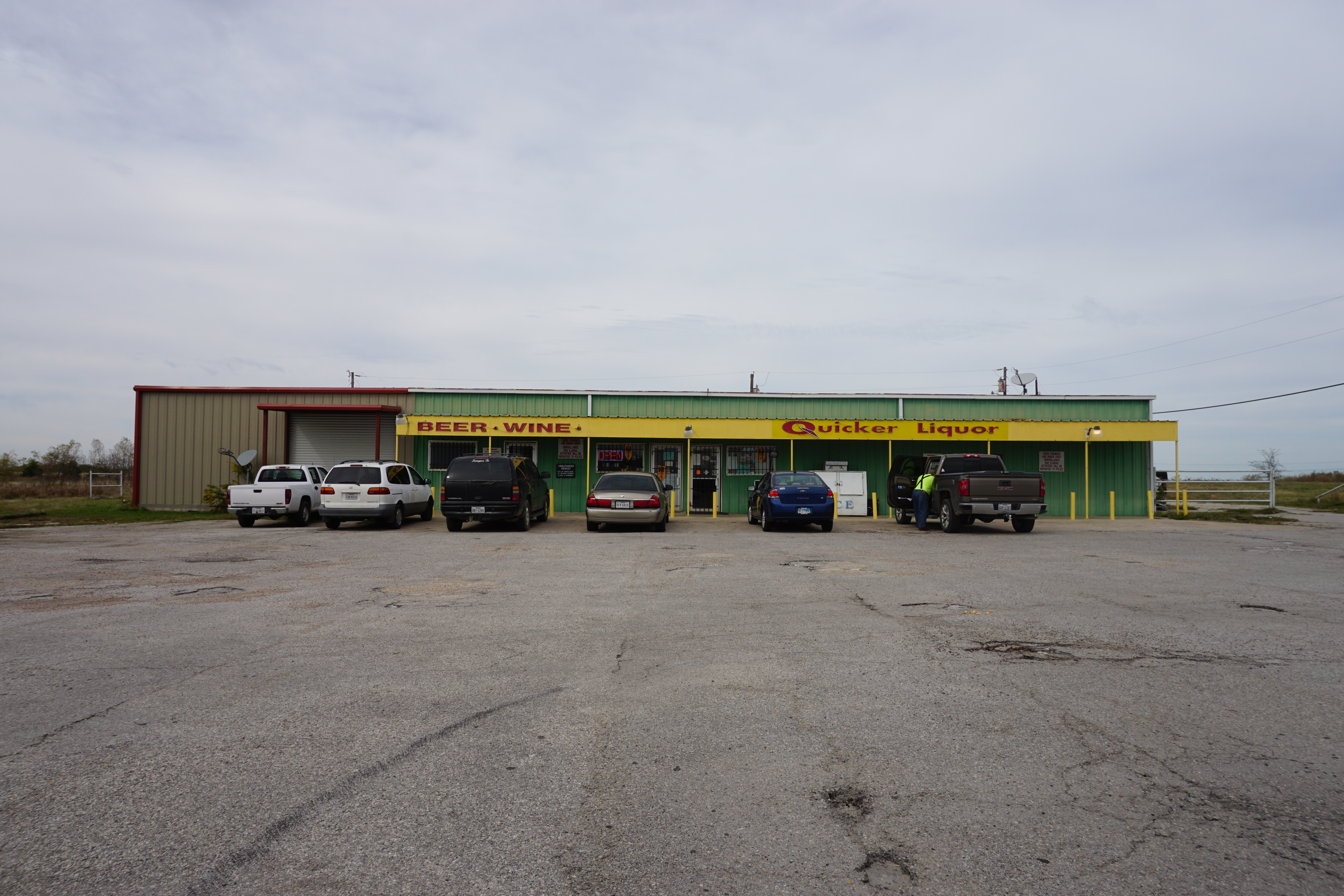
- Quicker Liquor in Neylandville

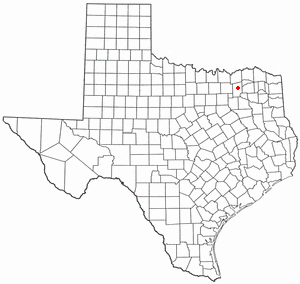
- Location of Neylandville, Texas

- Coordinates: 33°12′10″N 96°0′9″W
- Country: United States
- State: Texas
- County: Hunt

Area
  - Total: 0.32 sq mi (0.82 km^{2})
  - Land: 0.32 sq mi (0.82 km^{2})
  - Water: 0 sq mi (0.00 km^{2})
- Elevation: 541 ft (165 m)

Population (2020)
  - Total: 67
  - Density: 210/sq mi (82/km^{2})
- Time zone: UTC-6 (Central (CST))
  - Summer (DST): UTC-5 (CDT)
- Area codes: 903, 430
- FIPS code: 48-51444
- GNIS feature ID: 2413049

Neylandville is a town in Hunt County, Texas, United States. The population was 67 at the 2020 census, down from 97 at the 2010 census.

== Geography ==
Neylandville is located northeast of the center of Hunt County. Texas State Highway 224 passes through the town, leading northeast 7 miles (11 km) to Commerce and southwest 8 miles (13 km) to Greenville, the Hunt county seat.

According to the United States Census Bureau, the town has a total area of 0.3 square miles (0.78 km^{2}), all land.

== Demographics ==
Historical population
Census	Pop.	Note	%±
1970	186		—
1980	168		−9.7%
1990	94		−44.0%
2000	56		−40.4%
2010	97		73.2%
2020	67		−30.9%
U.S. Decennial Census

=== 2020 census ===
Neylandville town, Texas – Racial and ethnic composition Note: the US Census treats Hispanic/Latino as an ethnic category. This table excludes Latinos from the racial categories and assigns them to a separate category. Hispanics/Latinos may be of any race.
Race / Ethnicity (NH = Non-Hispanic)	Pop 2000	Pop 2010	Pop 2020	% 2000	% 2010	% 2020
White alone (NH)	2	40	26	3.57%	41.24%	38.81%
Black or African American alone (NH)	54	42	29	96.43%	43.30%	43.28%
Native American or Alaska Native alone (NH)	0	0	0	0.00%	0.00%	0.00%
Asian alone (NH)	0	0	2	0.00%	0.00%	2.99%
Pacific Islander or Native Hawaiian alone (NH)	0	0	0	0.00%	0.00%	0.00%
Other race alone (NH)	0	0	1	0.00%	0.00%	1.49%
Mixed race or Multiracial (NH)	0	0	0	0.00%	0.00%	0.00%
Hispanic or Latino (any race)	0	15	9	0.00%	15.46%	13.43%
Total	56	97	67	100.00%	100.00%	100.00%

As of the 2020 United States census, there were 67 people, 43 households, and 33 families residing in the town.

=== 2000 census ===
As of the census of 2000, there were 56 people, 24 households, and 15 families residing in the town. The population density was 177.2 inhabitants per square mile (68.4/km^{2}). There were 32 housing units at an average density of 101.2 per square mile (39.1/km^{2}). The racial makeup of the town was 3.57% White and 96.43% African American.

There were 24 households, out of which 25.0% had children under the age of 18 living with them, 41.7% were married couples living together, 8.3% had a female householder with no husband present, and 37.5% were non-families. 33.3% of all households were made up of individuals, and 16.7% had someone living alone who was 65 years of age or older. The average household size was 2.33 and the average family size was 3.07.

In the town, the population was spread out, with 17.9% under the age of 18, 5.4% from 18 to 24, 30.4% from 25 to 44, 30.4% from 45 to 64, and 16.1% who were 65 years of age or older. The median age was 43 years. For every 100 females, there were 100.0 males. For every 100 females age 18 and over, there were 100.0 males.

The median income for a household in the town was $50,417, and the median income for a family was $52,083. Males had a median income of $23,333 versus $20,417 for females. The per capita income for the town was $21,888. There were no families and 14.6% of the population living below the poverty line, including no under eighteens and 40.0% of those over 64.

== Economy ==
Neylandville is home to one liquor store and one beer and wine store. It is the closest town to Greenville that allows the sale of alcoholic beverages.

== Education ==
Neylandville is served by the Commerce Independent School District.
