= Legacy Housing =

Mobile Home Manufacturer Based In Texas

Legacy Housing Corporation
- Type: Public company
- Traded as: Nasdaq: LEGH}
- Industry: Construction, Manufacturing
- Founded: May 2005; 21 years ago
- Headquarters: Bedford, Texas, United States
- Area served: Southern United States
- Key people: Curtis D. Hodgson (Chairman of the Board); Kenneth E. Shipley (President & CEO)
- Products: Mobile homes
- Number of employees: 800 (2020)
- Website: legacyhousing.com

Legacy Housing Corporation is an American mobile home manufacturer based in Bedford, Texas. They have manufacturing facilities in Commerce, Texas, Fort Worth, Texas, and Eatonton, Georgia. Legacy also directly sells homes through 13 retail stores and funds loans for their homes.

The company has approximately 800 employees. As of 9 December 2020, Legacy Housing Corporation had a market capitalization of over $361 million.

== History ==
Legacy Housing was founded in 2005 by Curtis Drew Hodgson (Chairman of the Board) and Kenneth E. Shipley (President and CEO) as Legacy Housing, Ltd. It is traded on NASDAQ as LEGH, after an IPO on December 14, 2018. The company repurchased over $3 million in stock in April 2019.

In 2019 the company's gross revenue was $169 million, versus $162 million in 2018. Approximately half of their sales are in Texas. Their consumer (chattel) loan portfolio was worth $105 million at an average APR of 14%. They also had $92.3 million in manufactured home park loans at variable rates, typically 4% over prime.

In 2018–2019, Legacy acquired five plots of land to develop into manufactured home communities, including 400 acres near Austin, Texas for $4.4 million in April 2018.

During the COVID-19 pandemic, in April 2020, Legacy announced a $25 million addition to their credit line, then announced receiving $6.5 million in federally backed small business loans as part of the Paycheck Protection Program. The company received scrutiny over this loan, which was aimed at small businesses. Legacy Housing returned the loan a day after the New York Times story broke.
