= Commerce High School (Commerce, Texas) =

Coordinates: 33.2416°N 95.9247°W

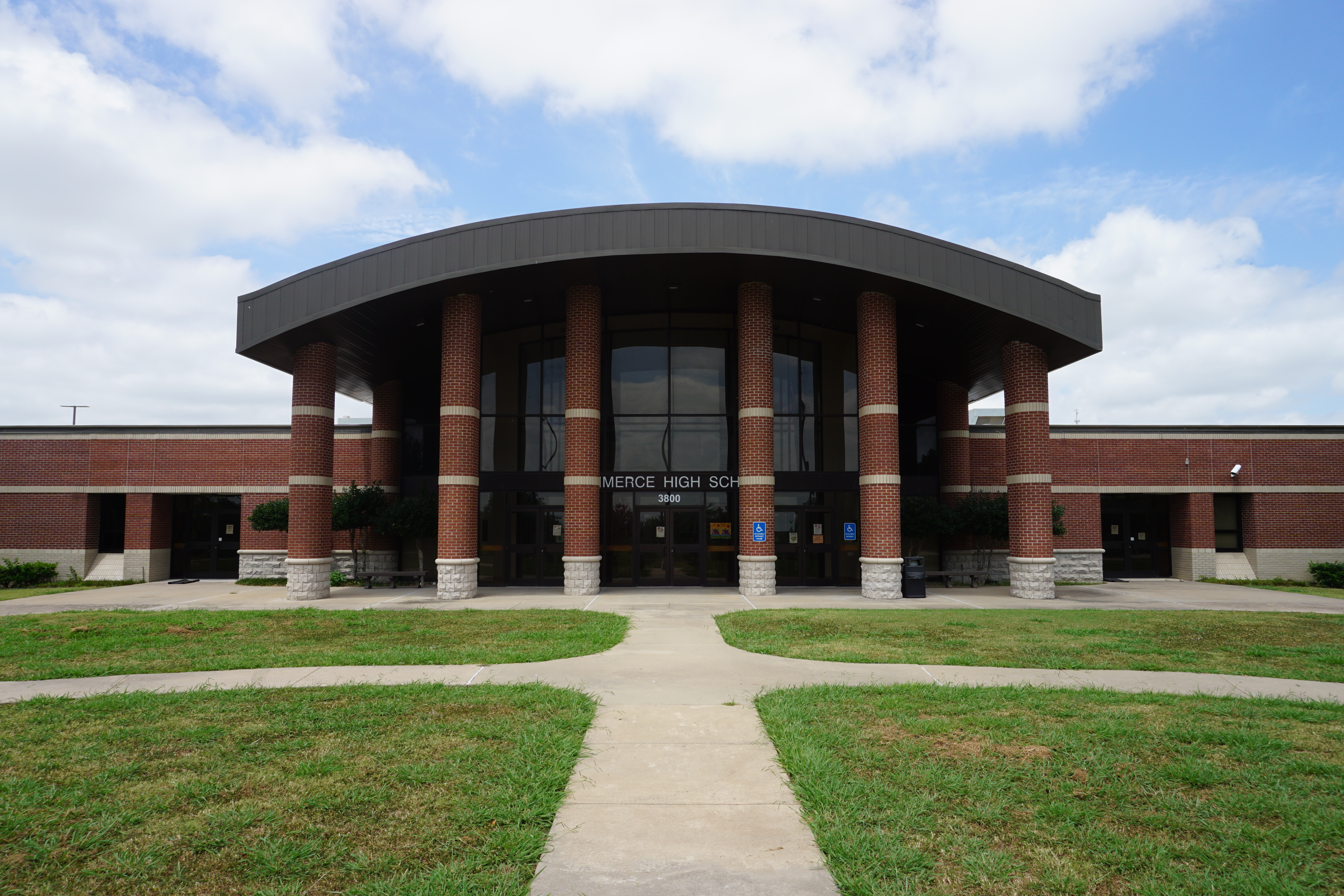
- Commerce High School

Location
- 3800 Sregit Road; Commerce, Texas 75428; United States

Information
- School type: Public high school
- Motto: Character, Humanity, Scholarship
- School district: Commerce Independent School District
- Principal: Jenna O'Neal
- Teaching staff: 40.99 (FTE)
- Grades: 9-12
- Enrollment: 485 (2023–2024)
- Student to teacher ratio: 11.83
- Colors: Black & Orange
- Athletics conference: UIL Class 3A
- Mascot: Tiger
- Website: Commerce High School website

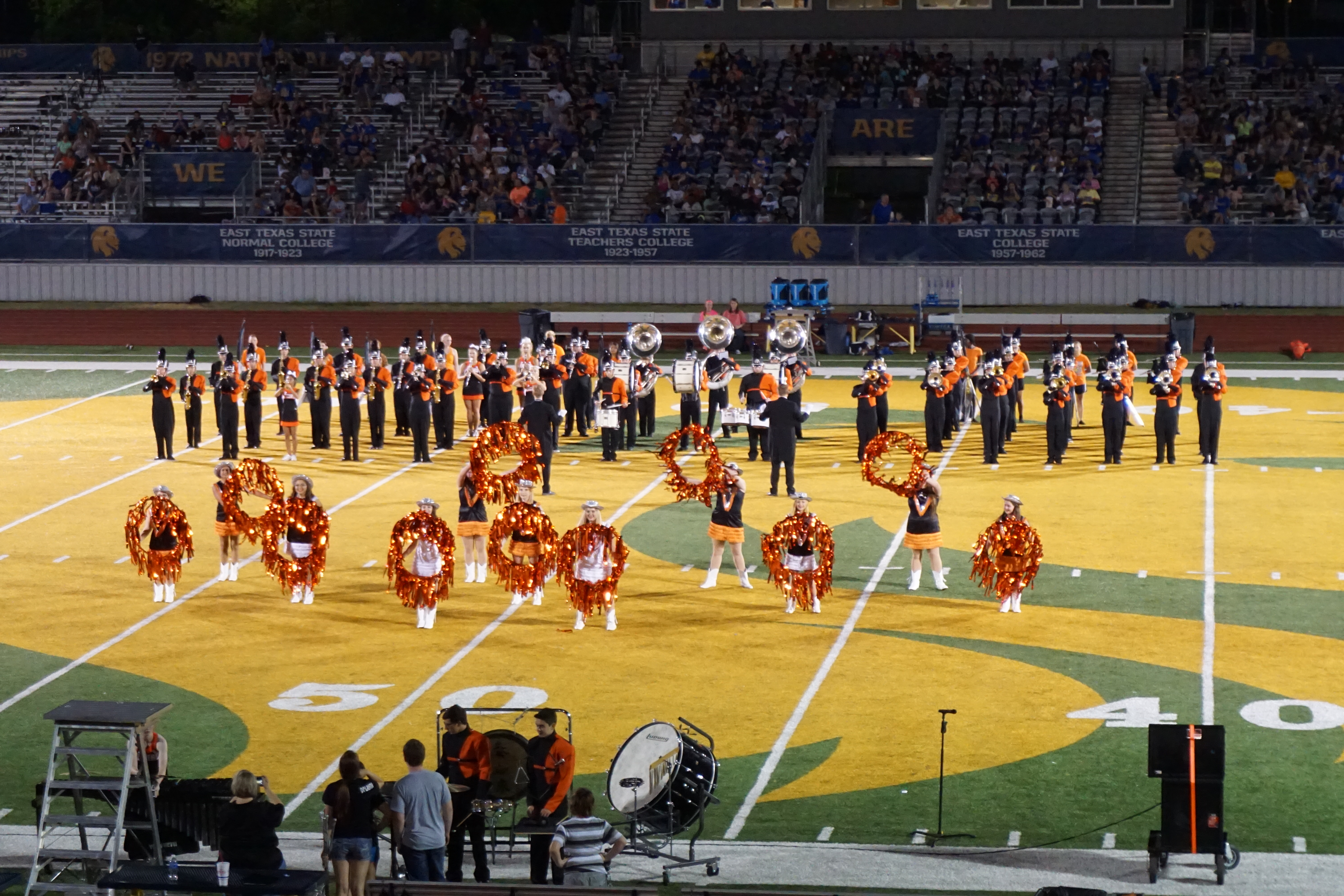
The Commerce High School Roarin' Tiger Band performing at a football game in 2015

Commerce High School is a 3A high school based in Commerce, Texas. It is part of the Commerce Independent School District located in northeast Hunt County. In 2013, the school was rated Met Standard by the Texas Education Agency.

== Athletics ==
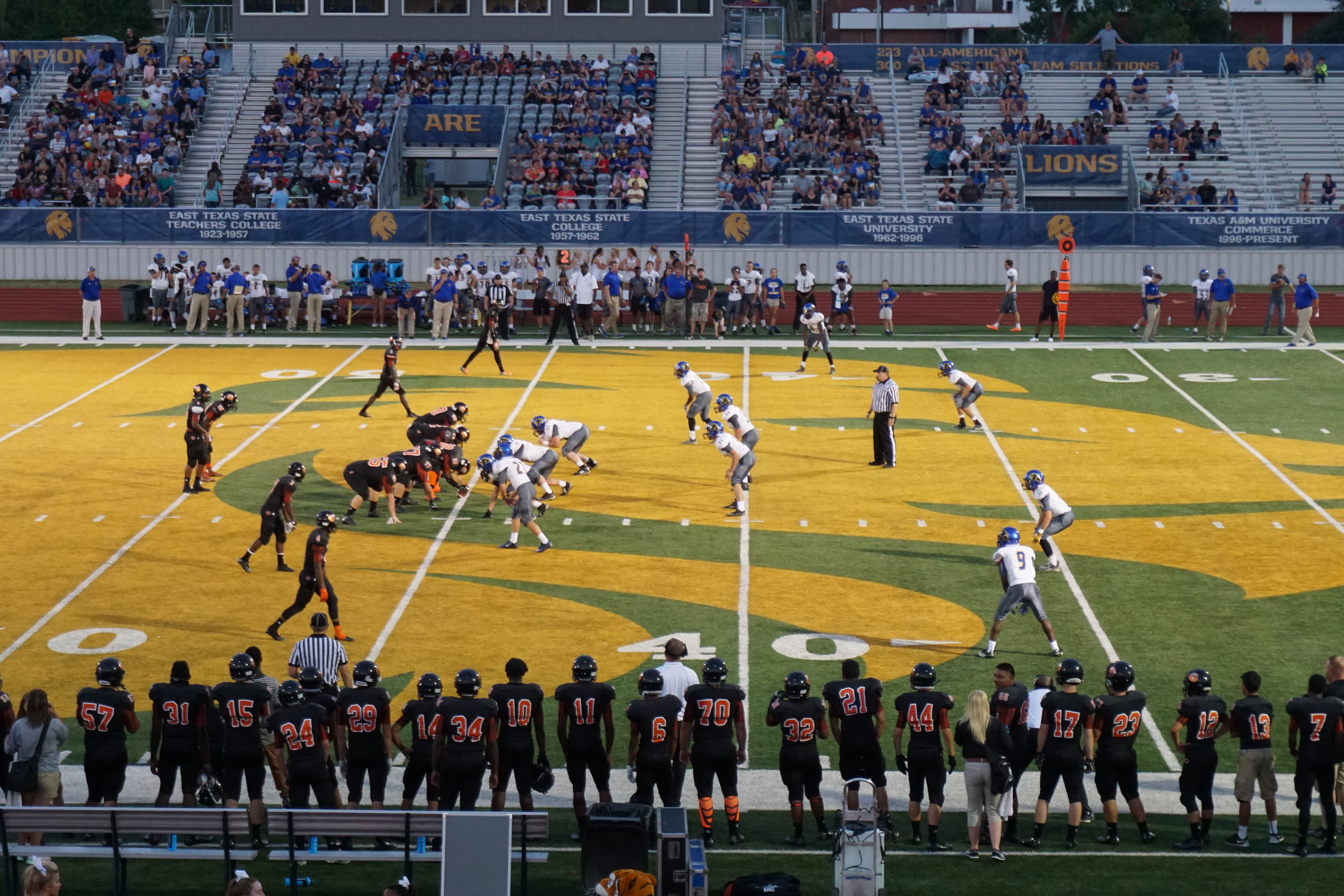
The Commerce Tigers football team in action against the North Lamar Panthers in 2015

The Commerce Tigers compete in the following sports -

Cross Country, Volleyball, Football, Basketball, Powerlifting, Golf, Tennis, Track, Softball & Baseball

=== State titles ===
Commerce (UIL)

- Football -
  - 1999 (3A/D2), 2001 (3A/D2)

Commerce Norris (PVIL)

- Boys Basketball -
  - 1964 (PVIL-1A)

==== State finalists ====
- Football -
  - 1995(3A), 1997(3A)

== Notable alumni ==
- Justin Rogers, former NFL player
- Wade Wilson, former NFL player and coach
- Jeana Yeager, aviator
