= Larry Lemanski =

American biologist

Larry F. Lemanski
- Born: June 5, 1943 (age 83); Madison, WI
- Education: Arizona State University
- Known for: Novel RNA that Promotes Myofibrillogenesis
- Scientific career
- Fields: Developmental biology, Stem Cell
- Workplaces: East Texas A&M University
- Doctoral advisor: Eldridge Bertke; Jerry Justus
- Other academic advisors: Lee D. Peachey
- Website: faculty.tamuc.edu/llemanski

Larry F. Lemanski is 'Distinguished Research Professor' and Director of the Biomedical Institute for Regenerative Research (BIRR) at East Texas A&M University He is also a Regents' Professor of the Texas A & M System, the highest level recognition for Texas A & M System's faculties. He received a B.S. from University of Wisconsin, Platteville and then both M.S. and Ph.D. from Arizona State University, Tempe. He was a postdoctoral fellow at the University of Pennsylvania, Philadelphia and worked there with Prof. Lee D. Peachey. He joined UCSF Medical Center, San Francisco in 1975 as served as an Assistant Professor of Anatomy (1975–1977); he moved to University of Wisconsin, Madison and worked there as Assistant Professor (1977–1979) and Associate Professor (1979–1981). He was appointed as full Professor in 1981. He was Provost and Vice President for Academic Affairs at East Texas A&M University during 2009–2012.

== Research ==
His main research interests concern a study of myofibrillogenesis and heart inductive processes in developing embryonic hearts at the cell and molecular levels. He has studied cardiac mutant axolotls, transgenic mice, and induced pluripotent adult stem cells. His goals have been to elucidate the sequence of events and mechanism(s) of myofibrillogenesis and to explain how inductive interactions direct heart differentiation at the cellular and gene levels. He is known for discovering unique and specific ribonucleic acids (RNAs) that have the capacity to promote cardiac myofibrillogenesis in non-muscle cells. He is pursuing the mechanism of this exciting and intriguing phenomenon and is exploring inducing heart muscle repair in hearts damaged from disease processes such as myocardial infarctions (heart attacks).
