= Commerce, Texas =

- City
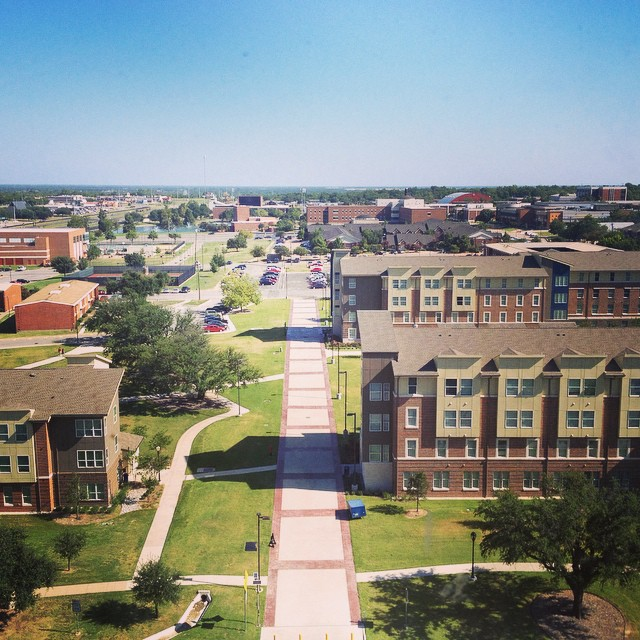
- View of the East Texas A&M University campus
- Nickname: "The 'Merce"
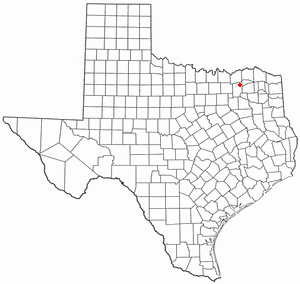
- Location of Commerce, Texas

- Coordinates: 33°14′42″N 95°53′40″W
- Country: United States
- State: Texas
- County: Hunt
- Region: Texas Blackland Prairies

Government
  - Mayor: Teddy Reel

Area
  - Total: 8.41 sq mi (21.77 km^{2})
  - Land: 8.33 sq mi (21.58 km^{2})
  - Water: 0.073 sq mi (0.19 km^{2})
- Elevation: 535 ft (163 m)

Population (2020)
  - Total: 9,090
  - Density: 1,081.4/sq mi (417.54/km^{2})
- Demonym: Commercite
- Time zone: UTC-6 (Central (CST))
  - Summer (DST): UTC-5 (CDT)
- ZIP codes: 75428-75429
- Area codes: 903, 430
- FIPS code: 48-16240
- GNIS feature ID: 2410211
- Website: commercetx.org

Commerce is a city in Hunt County, Texas, United States, situated on the eastern edge of North Texas and the western edge of East Texas, within the Texas Blackland Prairies. Located 45 miles (72 km) south of the Texas/Oklahoma border, Commerce is the second-largest city in Hunt County, Part of the greater Dallas metro area, with a population of 9,090 at the 2020 census. East Texas A&M University, a four-year university of more than 12,000 students, has been in Commerce since 1894. Commerce is one of the smallest college towns in Texas.

== History ==
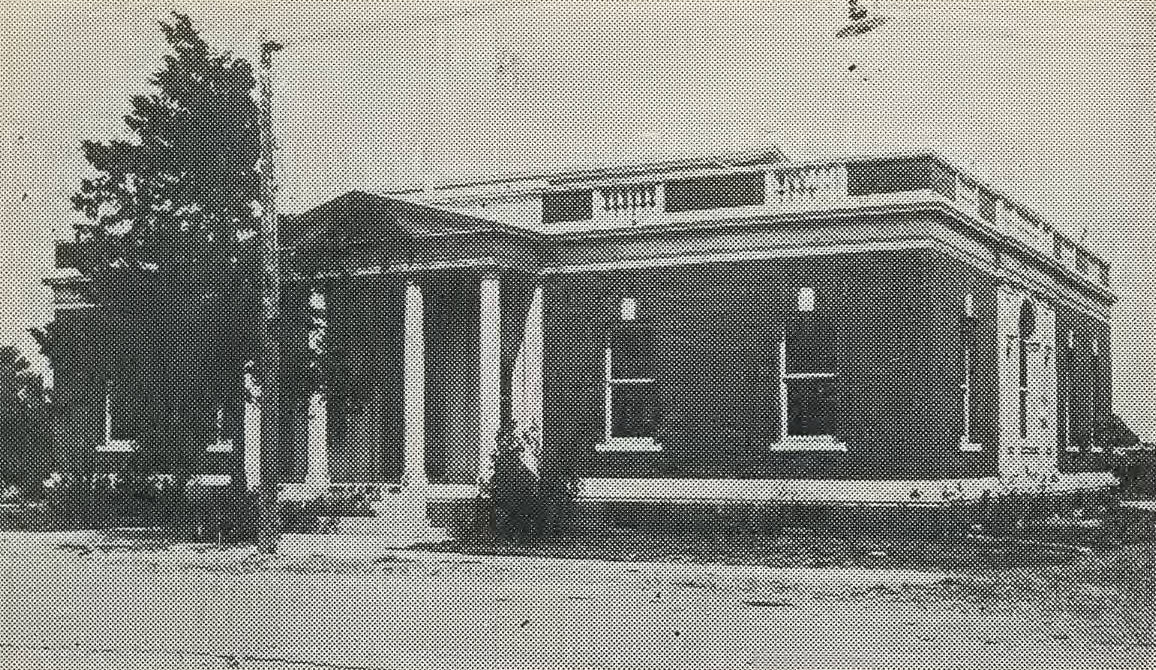
Commerce's Federal Building in 1920

Commerce was formed when two merchants named William Jernigan and Josiah Jackson established a trading post and mercantile store where the present-day downtown area is. The rural area just to the northeast was an open prairie originally known as Cow Hill. The town was established in 1872 and named "Commerce" due to the thriving economic activity among the cotton fields and ideal farm and ranch lands between the Middle and South Sulphur rivers on the rich, black gumbo prairie in northeast Hunt County. The town incorporated in 1885. Two years later, a railroad was built through Commerce to transport merchandise from Fort Worth, and nine years later, William L. Mayo, a college educator, moved East Texas Normal College from the northeast Texas town of Cooper to Commerce after the original school in Cooper was destroyed in a fire. Mayo continued as president of the college, now known as East Texas A&M University, until his death in 1917 and is buried on the campus grounds.

== Geography ==
According to the United States Census Bureau, Commerce has a total area of 8.0 square miles (20.7 km^{2}), of which 7.9 square miles (20.5 km^{2}) are land and 0.1 square miles (0.2 km^{2}), or 0.94%, are water. The Middle Sulphur River, part of the Red River watershed, runs past the north side of Commerce and forms part of its northern border.

=== Climate ===
Commerce's climate is part of the humid subtropical region. The temperature varies greatly throughout the year. Commerce has hot, humid and dry summers, typical of much of Texas, and above average spring temperatures. Commerce has cooler fall and winter temperatures, with higher wind chills due to its northern location and location on a natural prairie. During the spring is the strongest part of the storm season as thunderstorms are very common and tornadoes have been known to form in and around the area.

== Demographics ==
Historical population
Census	Pop.	Note	%±
1890	810		—
1900	1,800		122.2%
1910	2,818		56.6%
1920	3,842		36.3%
1930	4,267		11.1%
1940	4,699		10.1%
1950	5,889		25.3%
1960	5,789		−1.7%
1970	9,534		64.7%
1980	8,136		−14.7%
1990	6,825		−16.1%
2000	7,669		12.4%
2010	8,078		5.3%
2020	9,090		12.5%
2023 (est.)	9,467		4.1%
U.S. Decennial Census

=== 2020 census ===
As of the 2020 census, Commerce had a population of 9,090, 2,946 households, and 1,620 families residing in the city. The population density was 1,080.85 inhabitants per square mile (417.32/km^{2}). There were 3,589 housing units at an average density of 426.75 per square mile (164.77/km^{2}). The average family size was 3.34.

The median age was 23.5 years. 16.5% of residents were under the age of 18 and 9.8% of residents were 65 years of age or older. For every 100 females there were 85.4 males, and for every 100 females age 18 and over there were 83.7 males age 18 and over.

91.5% of residents lived in urban areas, while 8.5% lived in rural areas.

There were 2,946 households in Commerce, of which 27.9% had children under the age of 18 living in them. Of all households, 30.4% were married-couple households, 25.7% were households with a male householder and no spouse or partner present, and 36.8% were households with a female householder and no spouse or partner present. About 37.6% of all households were made up of individuals and 10.1% had someone living alone who was 65 years of age or older.

There were 3,589 housing units, of which 17.9% were vacant. Among occupied housing units, 32.9% were owner-occupied and 67.1% were renter-occupied. The homeowner vacancy rate was 3.1% and the rental vacancy rate was 11.7%.

Racial composition as of the 2020 census
Race	Number	Percent
White	4,694	51.6%
Black or African American	2,519	27.7%
American Indian and Alaska Native	137	1.5%
Asian	254	2.8%
Native Hawaiian and Other Pacific Islander	67	0.7%
Some other race	449	4.9%
Two or more races	970	10.7%
Hispanic or Latino (of any race)	986	10.8%

The median income for a household in the city was $34,946, and the median income for a family was $52,188. About 32.1% of the population were below the poverty line, including 33.6% of those under age 18 and 12.6% of those age 65 or over.

== Economy ==
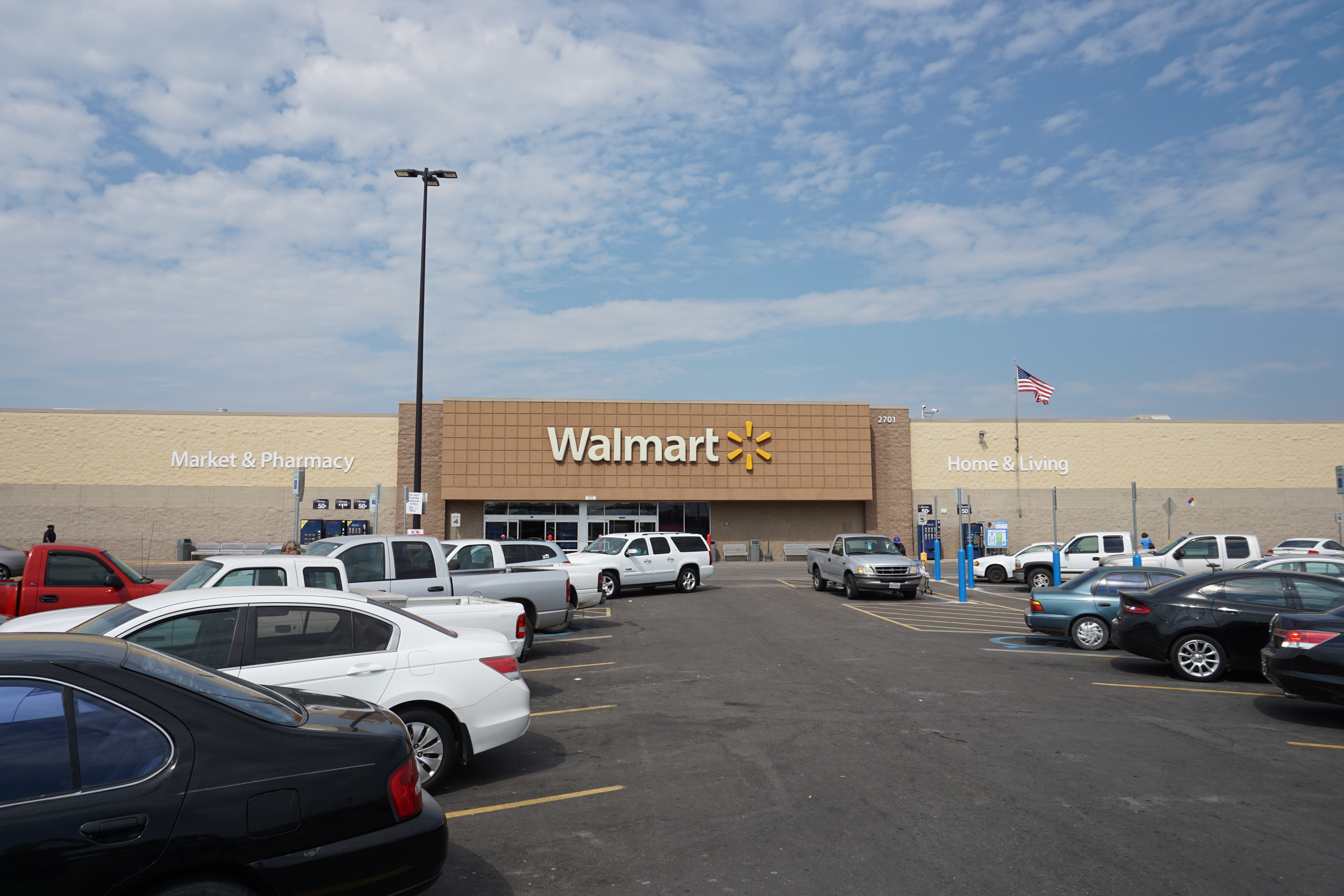
Walmart location in Commerce

#	Employer	# of employees
1	East Texas A&M University	900
2	Walmart	251
3	Commerce ISD	250
4	Legacy Housing	178
5	City of Commerce	85
6	Ben E. Keith Company	84

== Arts and culture ==
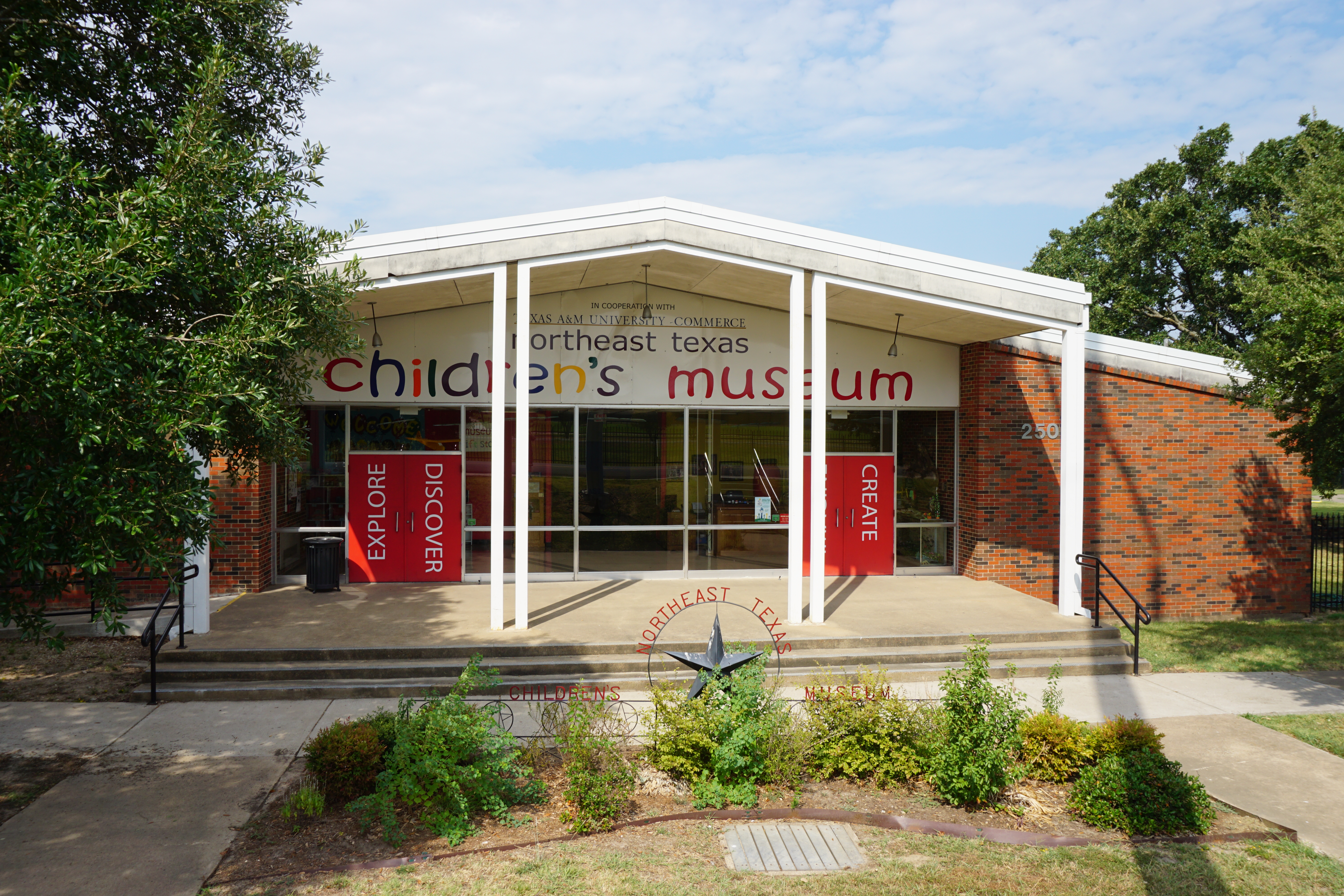
The Northeast Texas Children's Museum in Commerce

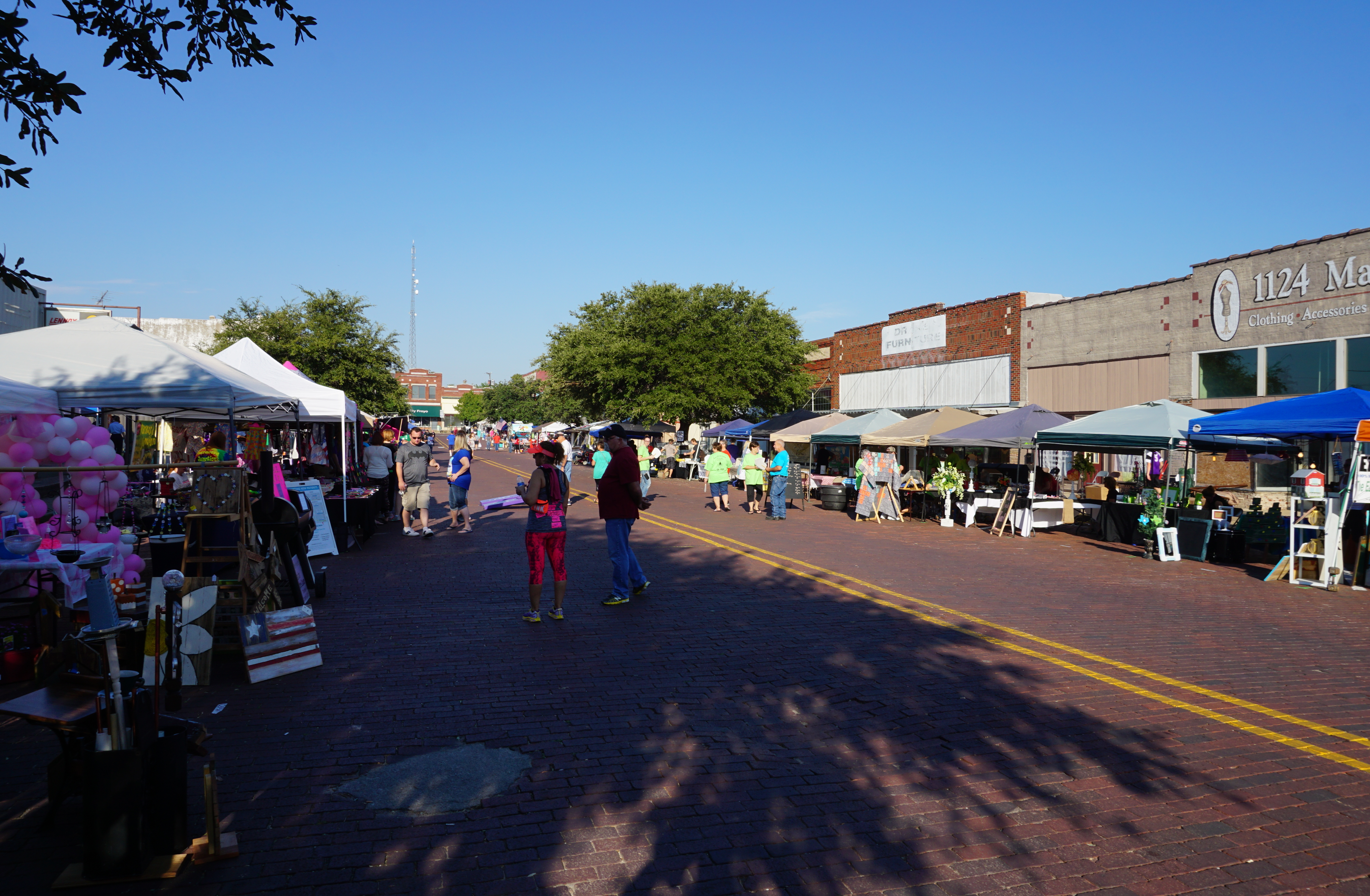
Bois d'Arc Bash

The Texas Children's Museum in Commerce features exhibits and programs for children. School districts from the Dallas/Fort Worth Metroplex and the Northeast Texas visit the museum.

Commerce was named the "Bois d'Arc Capital of Texas" because of its location in the geographic center of the indigenous range of the bois d'arc tree. The second largest bois d'arc tree in Texas, "Big Max", recognized by the National Forests Famous and Historic Trees, is located within the city limits. An annual Bois d'Arc Bash pays homage to the native trees which in frontier days provided foundations, fences and weapons for Native Americans. The Bois d'Arc Bash features arts and crafts, vendors, a parade, entertainment, a 5K run, and auto show.

== Sports ==
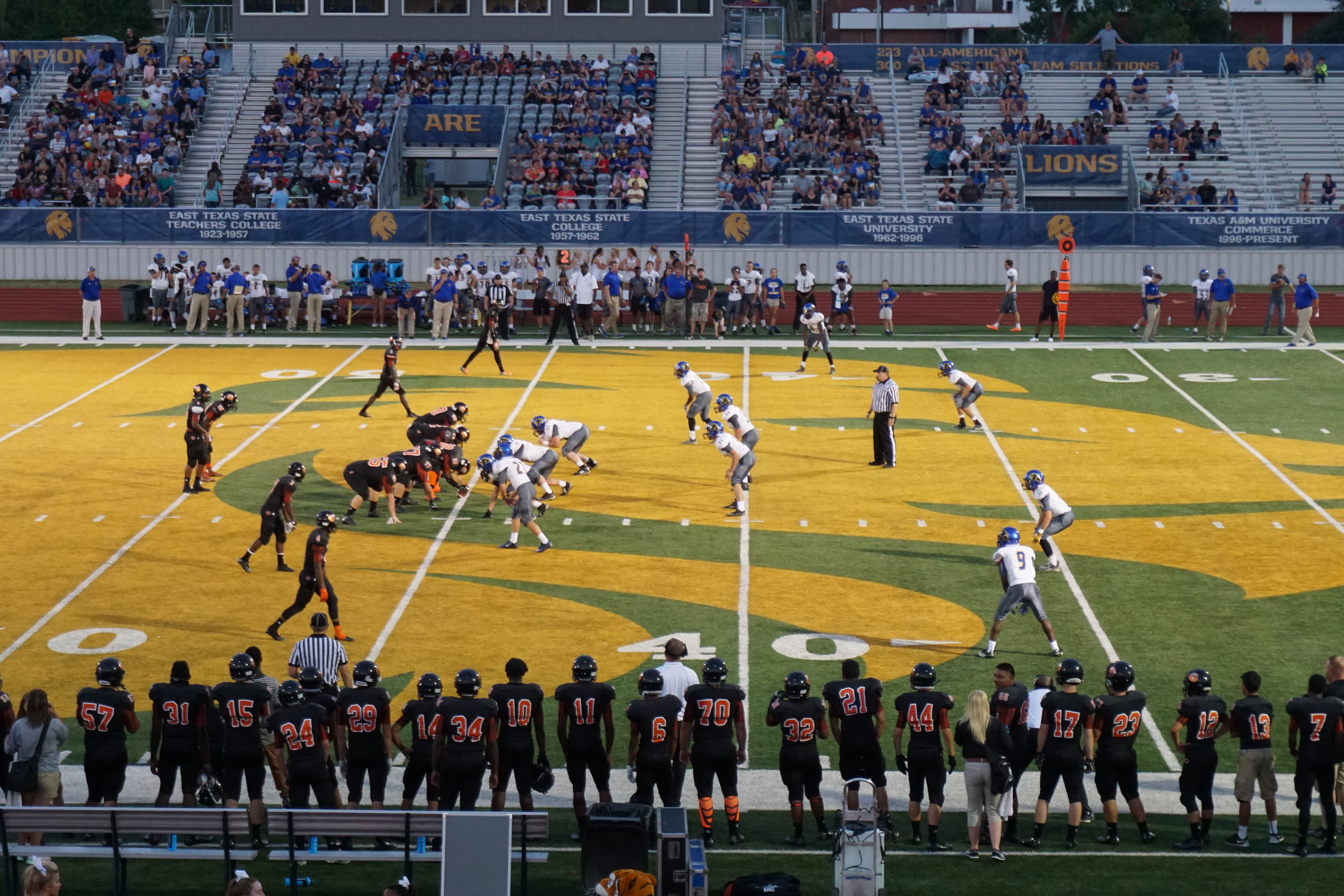
The Commerce Tigers football team in action against the North Lamar Panthers in 2015

East Texas A&M Lions teams include:

- Men's football
- Women's volleyball
- Men's basketball
- Women's basketball
- Women's soccer
- Women's softball

The teams have earned six national titles: men's basketball (1954–1955), men's golf (1965), football (1972, 2017), and men's tennis (1972, 1978).

In 2022, the athletics programs transitioned to NCAA Division I in the Southland Conference.

== Education ==
=== Primary and secondary education ===
Public education is administered by the Commerce Independent School District, which operates the following schools:

- Commerce Elementary (Pre-K–2)
- AC Williams Elementary (3–5)
- Commerce Middle School (6–8)
- Commerce High School (9–12)

=== Post-secondary education ===
East Texas A&M University moved to Commerce in 1894. The school offers over 100 different majors, with an enrolment of 12,302 students.

== Media ==
KETR radio station was founded in 1975 at the A&M-Commerce campus.

== Infrastructure ==
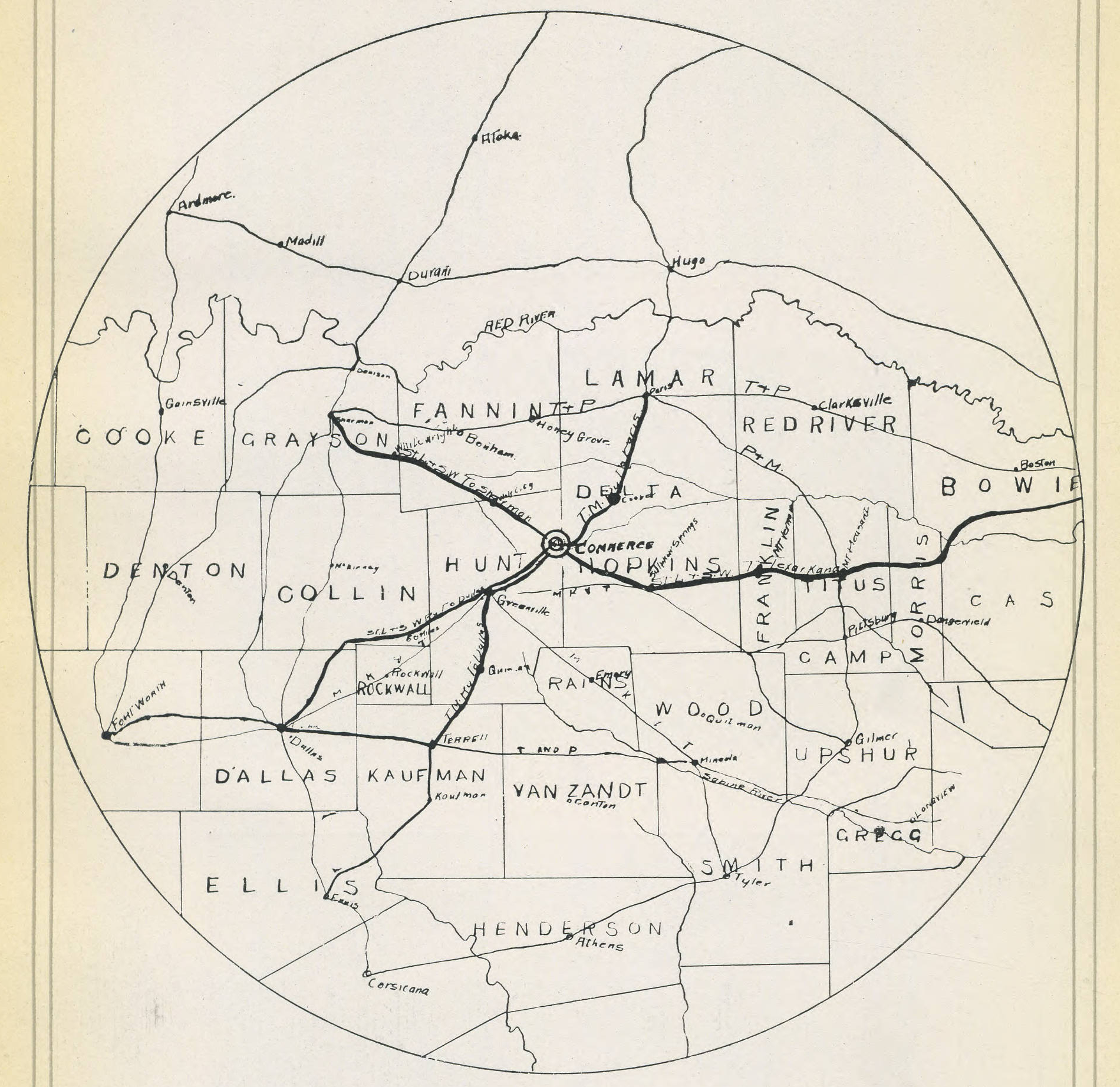
1920 map of Commerce and surroundings

=== Transportation ===
Highways:

- Texas State Highway 11
- Texas State Highway 24
- Texas State Highway 50
- Texas State Highway 224
- Texas State Highway Loop 178
- Texas Farm to Market Road 71
- Texas Farm to Market Road 2874
- Texas Farm to Market Road 3218
- Business 224–A business route
- Business 11–A business route

Commerce is served by Commerce Municipal Airport.

Public transit called "The Connection" serves Commerce and all of Hunt County.

== Notable people ==
- George C. Butte, Republican candidate for governor of Texas
- Claire Chennault, World War II Lieutenant General in the Army Air Corps
- Ben Kweller, rock musician who penned a song called "Commerce, TX"
- Larry Lemanski, director of the Biomedical Institute for Regenerative Research at Texas A&M-Commerce
- Samuel T. Rayburn, graduated from East Texas Normal College, Speaker of the United States House of Representatives
- Adam Kelly Ward, convicted murderer of code enforcement officer Michael Walker in 2005; executed in March 2016
- Wade Wilson, former All-Pro NFL quarterback and former quarterbacks coach for the Dallas Cowboys
