= Commerce Independent School District =

School district in Texas

Location
- Commerce, TX ESC Region 10 USA

District information
- Type: Public
- Grades: Pre-K through 12
- Superintendent: Steve Drummond

Students and staff
- Athletic conference: UIL Class 3A
- Colors: Orange and Black

Other information
- Mascot: Tiger
- Website: Commerce ISD

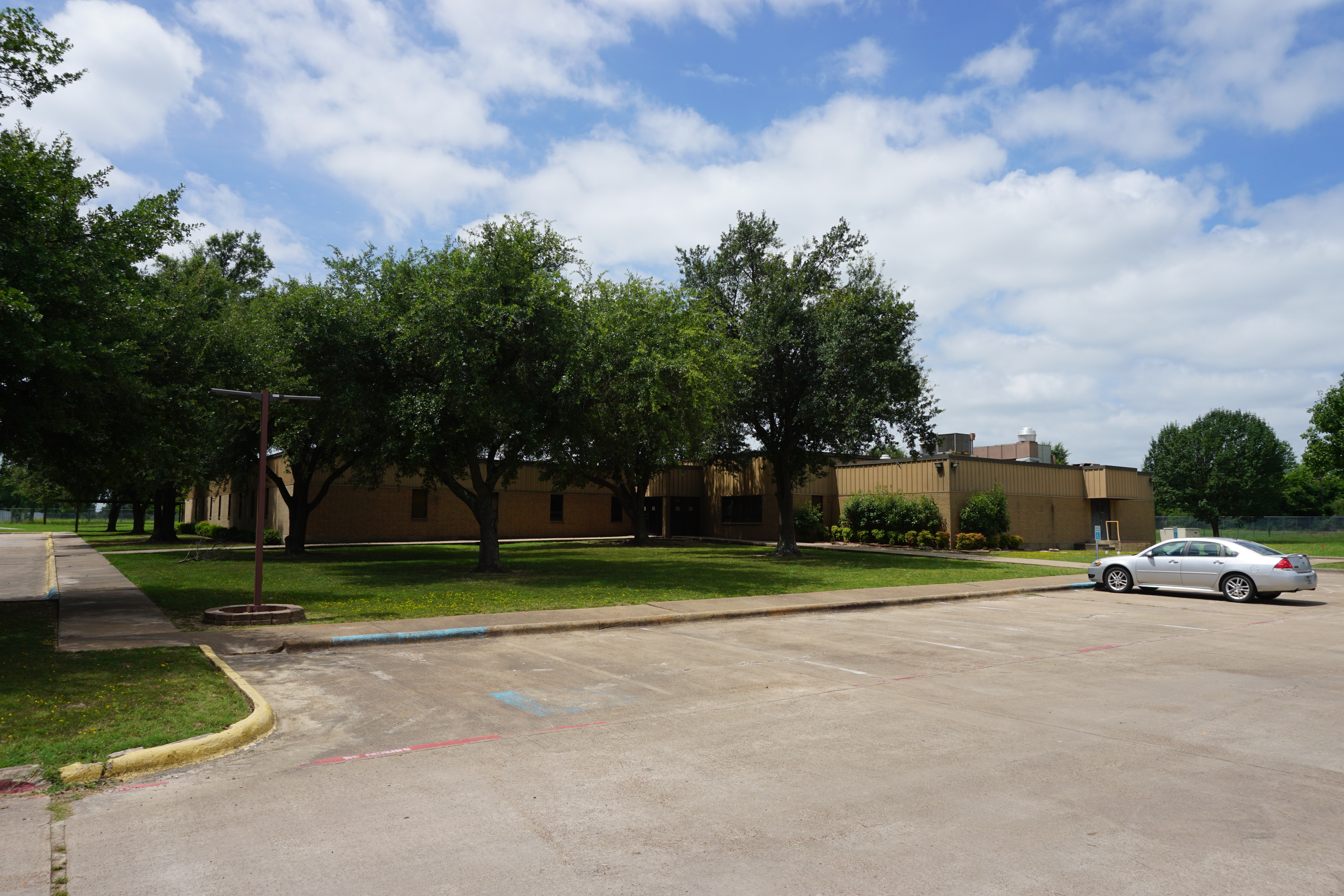
Commerce ISD headquarters

Commerce Independent School District is a public school district based in Commerce, Texas (USA).

In addition to Commerce, the district also serves the town of Neylandville. Although located mostly in Hunt County, the district extends into a very small portion of Delta County.

In 2009, the school district was rated "academically acceptable" by the Texas Education Agency.

== Schools ==
- Commerce High School (Grades 9-12)
- Commerce Middle School (Grades 6–8)
- Albert C. Williams Elementary School (Grades 3–5)
- Commerce Elementary School (Grades PK-2)

== Principals ==
- CHS- Jenna O'Neal
- CMS- Patricia Nelle
- ACW- Rachel Copeland
- CES- Haley McDonald

As of 2024-2025 school year
