= List of school districts in Texas =

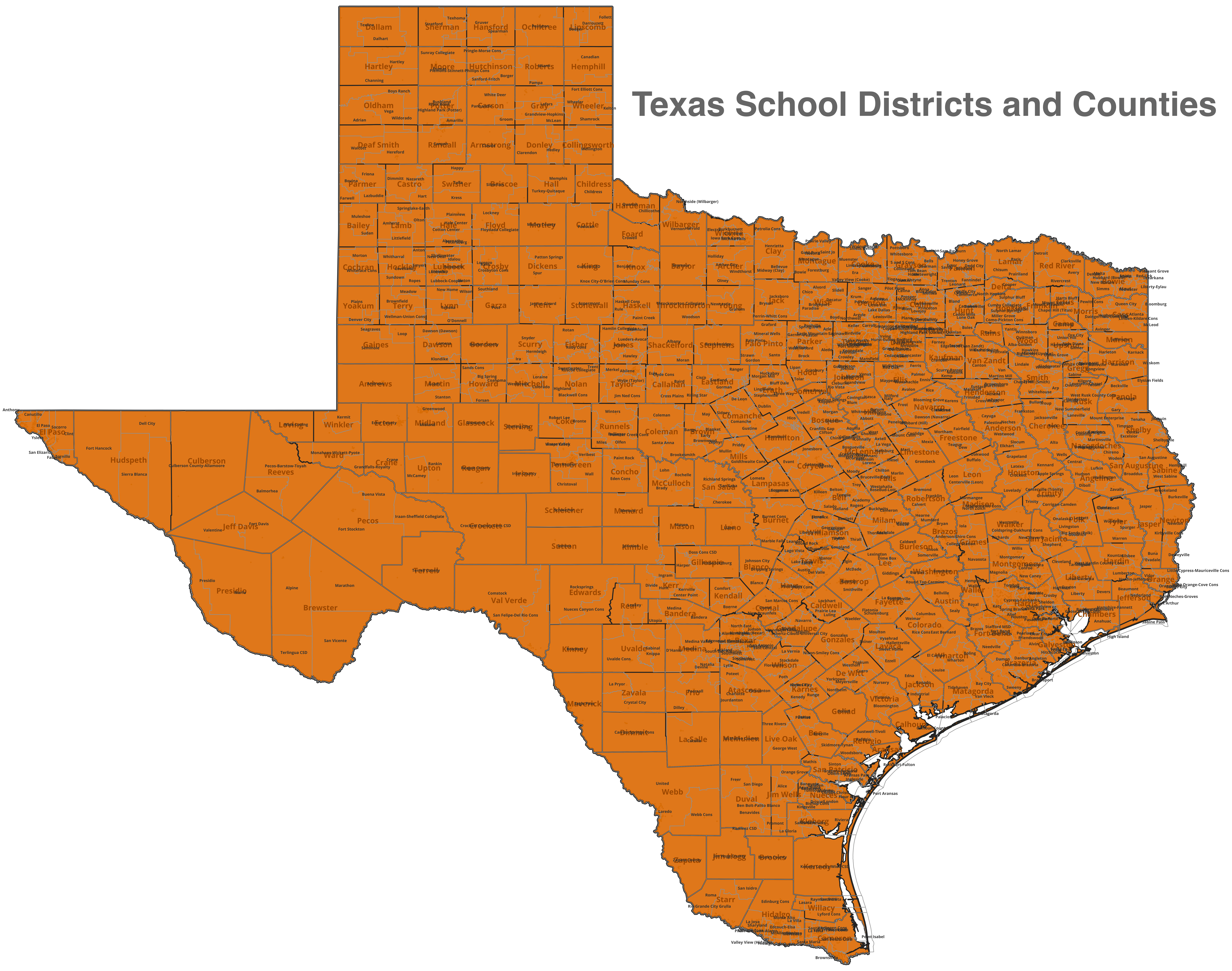
Texas School Districts

This list of school districts in Texas is sorted by Education Service Center (ESC) region and then by county.

School districts are placed in several classifications. Among them are independent school districts, common school districts, municipal school districts, rural high school districts, industrial training school districts, rehabilitation districts for the handicapped, and several types of junior college districts. The U.S. Census Bureau considers the existing K-12 school districts to be independent governments, including Stafford Municipal School District, the sole school district in the state called a "municipal school district".

Texas school district boundaries do not typically align with county or city boundaries; a district can occupy several counties and cities, while a single city (especially larger ones such as Dallas, Houston, or San Antonio) may be split between several districts.

Almost all Texas school districts use the title "Independent School District", or ISD. Those few districts that do not have "ISD" in their names are nonetheless ISDs.

This list does not include:

- Juvenile prison schools run by the Texas Juvenile Justice Department (formerly by the Texas Youth Commission)
- Schools and school systems without campuses or local taxing districts, such as the Texas Tech University Independent School District
- Public charter schools

It does include ISDs run by orphanages or homes for troubled children. However, only three examples are known, the Masonic Home Independent School District (which closed in 2005 and is listed with the other defunct school districts below the main list), the Boles Independent School District (which later expanded to serve homes in the nearby area; the organization now also serves troubled children who are not orphaned), and the Boys Ranch Independent School District (which only serves troubled children who are residents; despite its name, it serves both boys and girls).

All districts come under the jurisdiction of the Texas Education Agency (TEA). Extracurricular activities involving competitions between schools typically come under the jurisdiction of the University Interscholastic League, which is not part of TEA.

== Region 1 ==
=== Brooks County ===
- Brooks County Independent School District

=== Cameron County ===
- Brownsville Independent School District
- Harlingen Consolidated Independent School District
- La Feria Independent School District
- Los Fresnos Consolidated Independent School District
- Point Isabel Independent School District
- Rio Hondo Independent School District
- San Benito Consolidated Independent School District
- Santa Maria Independent School District
- Santa Rosa Independent School District
- South Texas Independent School District (also extends into Hidalgo and Willacy Counties)

=== Hidalgo County ===
- Donna Independent School District
- Edcouch-Elsa Independent School District
- Edinburg Consolidated Independent School District
- Hidalgo Independent School District
- La Joya Independent School District
- La Villa Independent School District
- McAllen Independent School District
- Mercedes Independent School District
- Mission Consolidated Independent School District
- Monte Alto Independent School District
- Pharr-San Juan-Alamo Independent School District
- Progreso Independent School District
- Sharyland Independent School District
- Valley View Independent School District
- Weslaco Independent School District

=== Jim Hogg County ===
- Jim Hogg County Independent School District

=== Starr County ===
- Rio Grande City Consolidated Independent School District
- Roma Independent School District
- San Isidro Independent School District

=== Webb County ===
- Laredo Independent School District
- United Independent School District
- Webb Consolidated Independent School District

=== Willacy County ===
- Lasara Independent School District
- Lyford Consolidated Independent School District (also extends into Cameron and Hidalgo Counties)
- Raymondville Independent School District
- San Perlita Independent School District

=== Zapata County ===
- Zapata County Independent School District

== Region 2 ==
=== Aransas County ===
- Rockport-Fulton Independent School District

=== Bee County ===
- Beeville Independent School District
- Pawnee Independent School District (also extends into Karnes County)
- Pettus Independent School District (also extends into Karnes County)
- Skidmore-Tynan Independent School District (also extends into San Patricio County)

=== Duval County ===
- Benavides Independent School District
- Freer Independent School District
- Ramirez Common School District
- San Diego Independent School District (also extends into Jim Wells County)

=== Jim Wells County ===
- Alice Independent School District
- Ben Bolt-Palito Blanco Independent School District
- La Gloria Independent School District
- Orange Grove Independent School District
- Premont Independent School District (also extends into Duval County)

=== Kenedy County ===
- Kenedy County Wide Common School District

=== Kleberg County ===
- Kingsville Independent School District
- Ricardo Independent School District
- Riviera Independent School District (also extends into Kenedy County)
- Santa Gertrudis Independent School District

=== Live Oak County ===
- George West Independent School District
- Three Rivers Independent School District (also extends into Bee County)

=== McMullen County ===
- McMullen County Independent School District

=== Nueces County ===
- Agua Dulce Independent School District (also extends into Jim Wells County)
- Banquete Independent School District
- Bishop Consolidated Independent School District
- Calallen Independent School District
- Corpus Christi Independent School District
- Driscoll Independent School District
- Flour Bluff Independent School District
- London Independent School District
- Port Aransas Independent School District (also extends into Aransas County)
- Robstown Independent School District
- Tuloso-Midway Independent School District
- West Oso Independent School District

=== San Patricio County ===
- Aransas Pass Independent School District (also extends into Aransas and Nueces Counties)
- Gregory-Portland Independent School District
- Ingleside Independent School District
- Mathis Independent School District (also extends into Bee and Live Oak Counties)
- Odem-Edroy Independent School District
- Sinton Independent School District
- Taft Independent School District

== Region 3 ==
=== Calhoun County ===
- Calhoun County Independent School District

=== Colorado County ===
- Columbus Independent School District (also extends into Austin County)
- Rice Consolidated Independent School District
- Weimar Independent School District (also extends into Fayette and Lavaca Counties)

=== DeWitt County ===
- Cuero Independent School District (also extends into Gonzales County)
- Meyersville Independent School District (also extends into Victoria County)
- Nordheim Independent School District (also extends into Karnes County)
- Westhoff Independent School District
- Yoakum Independent School District (also extends into Gonzales and Lavaca Counties)
- Yorktown Independent School District

=== Goliad County ===
- Goliad Independent School District

=== Jackson County ===
- Edna Independent School District
- Ganado Independent School District
- Industrial Independent School District (also extends into Victoria County)

=== Karnes County ===
- Kenedy Independent School District
- Runge Independent School District

=== Lavaca County ===
- Ezzell Independent School District
- Hallettsville Independent School District (also extends into Colorado, Jackson and Wharton Counties; also serves grades 9-12 from Vysehrad Independent School District)
- Moulton Independent School District (also extends into Gonzales County)
- Shiner Independent School District (also extends into Gonzales County)
- Sweet Home Independent School District
- Vysehrad Independent School District

=== Matagorda County ===
- Bay City Independent School District
- Matagorda Independent School District
- Palacios Independent School District (also extends into Jackson County)
- Tidehaven Independent School District
- Van Vleck Independent School District

=== Refugio County ===
- Austwell-Tivoli Independent School District
- Refugio Independent School District (also extends into Bee and Victoria Counties)
- Woodsboro Independent School District

=== Victoria County ===
- Bloomington Independent School District
- Nursery Independent School District
- Victoria Independent School District

=== Wharton County ===
- Boling Independent School District (also extends into Matagorda County)
- East Bernard Independent School District
- El Campo Independent School District
- Louise Independent School District
- Wharton Independent School District

== Region 4 ==
=== Brazoria County ===
- Alvin Independent School District
- Angleton Independent School District
- Brazosport Independent School District
- Columbia-Brazoria Independent School District
- Damon Independent School District
- Danbury Independent School District
- Pearland Independent School District (also extends into Harris County)
- Sweeny Independent School District

=== Chambers County ===
- Anahuac Independent School District
- Barbers Hill Independent School District

=== Fort Bend County ===
- Lamar Consolidated Independent School District
- Fort Bend Independent School District
- Needville Independent School District
- Stafford Municipal School District (also extends into Harris County)

=== Galveston County ===
- Clear Creek Independent School District (also extends into Harris County)
- Dickinson Independent School District
- Friendswood Independent School District
- Galveston Independent School District
- Hitchcock Independent School District
- Santa Fe Independent School District
- Texas City Independent School District

=== Harris County ===
- Aldine Independent School District
- Alief Independent School District
- Channelview Independent School District
- Crosby Independent School District
- Cypress-Fairbanks Independent School District
- Deer Park Independent School District
- Galena Park Independent School District
- Goose Creek Consolidated Independent School District (also extends into Chambers County)
- Houston Independent School District
- Huffman Independent School District
- Humble Independent School District (also extends into Montgomery County)
- Katy Independent School District (also extends into Fort Bend and Waller Counties)
- Klein Independent School District
- La Porte Independent School District (also extends into Chambers County)
- Pasadena Independent School District
- Sheldon Independent School District
- Spring Independent School District
- Spring Branch Independent School District
- Tomball Independent School District (also extends into Montgomery County)

=== Liberty County ===
- Cleveland Independent School District (also extends into Montgomery and San Jacinto Counties)
- Dayton Independent School District (also extends into Harris County)
- Devers Independent School District
- Tarkington Independent School District

=== Waller County ===
- Hempstead Independent School District
- Royal Independent School District
- Waller Independent School District (also extends into Harris County)

== Region 5 ==
=== Chambers County ===
- East Chambers Independent School District

=== Galveston County ===
- High Island Independent School District

=== Hardin County ===
- Hardin-Jefferson Independent School District (also extends into Jefferson County)
- Lumberton Independent School District
- Kountze Independent School District
- Silsbee Independent School District
- West Hardin County Consolidated Independent School District

=== Jasper County ===
- Brookeland Independent School District (also extends into Newton, Sabine and San Augustine Counties)
- Buna Independent School District
- Evadale Independent School District
- Jasper Independent School District
- Kirbyville Consolidated Independent School District (also extends into Newton County)

=== Jefferson County ===
- Beaumont Independent School District
- Hamshire-Fannett Independent School District
- Nederland Independent School District
- Port Arthur Independent School District
- Port Neches-Groves Independent School District
- Sabine Pass Independent School District

=== Liberty County ===
- Hardin Independent School District
- Hull-Daisetta Independent School District
- Liberty Independent School District

=== Newton County ===
- Burkeville Independent School District
- Deweyville Independent School District
- Newton Independent School District

=== Orange County ===
- Bridge City Independent School District
- Little Cypress-Mauriceville Consolidated Independent School District
- Orangefield Independent School District
- Vidor Independent School District (also extends into Jasper County)
- West Orange-Cove Consolidated Independent School District

=== Tyler County ===
- Chester Independent School District (also extends into Polk County)
- Colmesneil Independent School District (also extends into Angelina and Jasper Counties)
- Spurger Independent School District
- Warren Independent School District (also extends into Hardin County)
- Woodville Independent School District (also extends into Polk County)

== Region 6 ==
=== Austin County ===
- Bellville Independent School District
- Brazos Independent School District (also extends into Fort Bend County)
- Sealy Independent School District

=== Brazos County ===
- Bryan Independent School District (also extends into Robertson County)
- College Station Independent School District

=== Burleson County ===
- Caldwell Independent School District
- Snook Independent School District
- Somerville Independent School District (also extends into Washington County)

=== Grimes County ===
- Anderson-Shiro Consolidated Independent School District
- Iola Independent School District
- Navasota Independent School District (also extends into Brazos County)
- Richards Independent School District (also extends into Montgomery and Walker Counties)

=== Houston County ===
- Crockett Independent School District
- Grapeland Independent School District
- Kennard Independent School District (also extends into Trinity County)
- Latexo Independent School District
- Lovelady Independent School District

=== Leon County ===
- Buffalo Independent School District (also extends into Freestone County)
- Centerville Independent School District
- Leon Independent School District (also extends into Robertson County)
- Normangee Independent School District (also extends into Madison County)
- Oakwood Independent School District (also extends into Freestone County)

=== Madison County ===
- Madisonville Consolidated Independent School District (also extends into Grimes County)
- North Zulch Independent School District

=== Milam County ===
- Cameron Independent School District
- Gause Independent School District
- Milano Independent School District
- Rockdale Independent School District

=== Montgomery County ===
- Conroe Independent School District (also extends into Harris County)
- Magnolia Independent School District
- Montgomery Independent School District
- New Caney Independent School District (also extends into Harris County)
- Splendora Independent School District
- Willis Independent School District (also extends into San Jacinto County)

=== Polk County ===
- Big Sandy Independent School District
- Corrigan-Camden Independent School District
- Goodrich Independent School District
- Leggett Independent School District
- Livingston Independent School District
- Onalaska Independent School District

=== Robertson County ===
- Bremond Independent School District (also extends into Falls County)
- Calvert Independent School District
- Franklin Independent School District
- Hearne Independent School District
- Mumford Independent School District

=== San Jacinto County ===
- Coldspring-Oakhurst Consolidated Independent School District
- Shepherd Independent School District

=== Trinity County ===
- Apple Springs Independent School District
- Groveton Independent School District (also extends into Houston County)
- Centerville Independent School District
- Trinity Independent School District (also extends into Walker County)

=== Walker County ===
- Huntsville Independent School District
- New Waverly Independent School District
- Windham Independent School District

=== Washington County ===
- Brenham Independent School District (also extends into Austin County)
- Burton Independent School District (also extends into Austin County)

== Region 7 ==
=== Anderson County ===
- Cayuga Independent School District
- Elkhart Independent School District (also extends into Houston County)
- Frankston Independent School District (also extends into Henderson County)
- Neches Independent School District
- Palestine Independent School District
- Slocum Independent School District
- Westwood Independent School District

=== Angelina County ===
- Central Independent School District
- Diboll Independent School District
- Hudson Independent School District
- Huntington Independent School District
- Lufkin Independent School District
- Zavalla Independent School District

=== Cherokee County ===
- Alto Independent School District
- Jacksonville Independent School District
- New Summerfield Independent School District
- Rusk Independent School District (also extends into Rusk County)
- Wells Independent School District (also extends into Angelina County)

=== Gregg County ===
- Gladewater Independent School District (also extends into Smith and Upshur Counties)
- Kilgore Independent School District (also extends into Rusk County)
- Longview Independent School District
- Pine Tree Independent School District
- Sabine Independent School District
- Spring Hill Independent School District
- White Oak Independent School District

=== Harrison County ===
- Elysian Fields Independent School District (also extends into Panola County)
- Hallsville Independent School District
- Harleton Independent School District
- Karnack Independent School District
- Marshall Independent School District
- Waskom Independent School District

=== Henderson County ===
- Brownsboro Independent School District (also extends into Van Zandt County)
- Cross Roads Independent School District
- Eustace Independent School District (also extends into Van Zandt County)
- La Poynor Independent School District (also extends into Anderson County)
- Malakoff Independent School District
- Murchison Independent School District
- Trinidad Independent School District

=== Nacogdoches County ===
- Central Heights Independent School District
- Chireno Independent School District (also extends into San Augustine County)
- Cushing Independent School District (also extends into Rusk County)
- Douglass Independent School District
- Garrison Independent School District (also extends into Rusk County)
- Martinsville Independent School District
- Nacogdoches Independent School District
- Woden Independent School District

=== Panola County ===
- Beckville Independent School District
- Carthage Independent School District
- Gary Independent School District

=== Rains County ===
- Rains Independent School District (also extends into Hunt County)

=== Rusk County ===
- Carlisle Independent School District (also extends into Cherokee County)
- Henderson Independent School District
- Laneville Independent School District
- Leverett's Chapel Independent School District
- Mount Enterprise Independent School District
- Overton Independent School District
- Tatum Independent School District (also extends into Panola County)
- West Rusk County Consolidated Independent School District

=== Sabine County ===
- Hemphill Independent School District
- West Sabine Independent School District

=== San Augustine County ===
- Broaddus Independent School District
- San Augustine Independent School District (also extends into Shelby County)

=== Shelby County ===
- Center Independent School District
- Excelsior Independent School District
- Joaquin Independent School District (also extends into Panola County)
- Shelbyville Independent School District (also extends into Sabine County)
- Tenaha Independent School District (also extends into Panola County)
- Timpson Independent School District

=== Smith County ===
- Arp Independent School District
- Bullard Independent School District (also extends into Cherokee County)
- Chapel Hill Independent School District
- Lindale Independent School District (also extends into Van Zandt County)
- Troup Independent School District (also extends into Cherokee County)
- Tyler Independent School District
- Whitehouse Independent School District
- Winona Independent School District

=== Upshur County ===
- Big Sandy Independent School District (also extends into Wood County)
- Gilmer Independent School District (also extends into Camp County)
- Harmony Independent School District (also extends into Wood County)
- New Diana Independent School District (also extends into Harrison County)
- Ore City Independent School District (also extends into Marion and Harrison Counties)
- Union Grove Independent School District
- Union Hill Independent School District (also extends into Wood County)

=== Van Zandt County ===
- Edgewood Independent School District
- Grand Saline Independent School District
- Martin's Mill Independent School District
- Fruitvale Independent School District
- Van Independent School District (also extends into Henderson and Smith Counties)

=== Wood County ===
- Alba-Golden Independent School District (also extends into Rains County)
- Hawkins Independent School District
- Mineola Independent School District
- Quitman Independent School District
- Winnsboro Independent School District (also extends into Franklin and Hopkins Counties)
- Yantis Independent School District (also extends into Hopkins County)

== Region 8 ==
=== Bowie County ===
- De Kalb Independent School District
- Hooks Independent School District
- Hubbard Independent School District
- Leary Independent School District
- Liberty-Eylau Independent School District
- Malta Independent School District
- Maud Independent School District
- New Boston Independent School District
- Pleasant Grove Independent School District
- Red Lick Independent School District
- Redwater Independent School District
- Simms Independent School District
- Texarkana Independent School District

=== Camp County ===
- Pittsburg Independent School District (also extends into Upshur and Wood Counties)

=== Cass County ===
- Atlanta Independent School District
- Avinger Independent School District (also extends into Marion County)
- Bloomburg Independent School District
- Hughes Springs Independent School District (also extends into Morris County)
- Linden-Kildare Consolidated Independent School District
- McLeod Independent School District
- Queen City Independent School District

=== Delta County ===
- Cooper Independent School District (also extends into Hunt County)
- Fannindel Independent School District (also extends into Fannin, Hunt and Lamar Counties)

=== Fannin County ===
- Honey Grove Independent School District (also extends into Lamar County)

=== Franklin County ===
- Mount Vernon Independent School District (also extends into Hopkins County)

=== Hopkins County ===
- Como-Pickton Consolidated Independent School District (also extends into Wood County)
- Cumby Independent School District (also extends into Hunt County)
- Miller Grove Independent School District (also extends into Rains County)
- North Hopkins Independent School District
- Saltillo Independent School District (also extends into Franklin County)
- Sulphur Bluff Independent School District (also extends into Franklin County)
- Sulphur Springs Independent School District

=== Lamar County ===
- Chisum Independent School District (also extends into Delta County)
- North Lamar Independent School District (also extends into Fannin County)
- Paris Independent School District
- Prairiland Independent School District (also extends into Red River County)

=== Marion County ===
- Jefferson Independent School District

=== Morris County ===
- Daingerfield-Lone Star Independent School District (also extends into Titus County)
- Pewitt Consolidated Independent School District (also extends into Cass and Titus Counties)

=== Red River County ===
- Avery Independent School District
- Clarksville Independent School District
- Detroit Independent School District
- Rivercrest Independent School District (also extends into Franklin and Titus Counties)

=== Titus County ===
- Chapel Hill Independent School District
- Harts Bluff Independent School District
- Mount Pleasant Independent School District

== Region 9 ==
=== Archer County ===
- Archer City Independent School District
- Holliday Independent School District (also extends into Wichita County)
- Windthorst Independent School District (also extends into Clay County)

=== Baylor County ===
- Seymour Independent School District (also extends into Knox County

=== Clay County ===
- Bellevue Independent School District
- Henrietta Independent School District
- Midway Independent School District (also extends into Jack County)
- Petrolia Consolidated Independent School District

=== Foard County ===
- Crowell Independent School District (also extends into King and Knox Counties)

=== Hardeman County ===
- Chillicothe Independent School District (also extends into Wilbarger County)
- Quanah Independent School District (also extends into Cottle County)

=== Jack County ===
- Bryson Independent School District (also extends into Young County)
- Jacksboro Independent School District (also extends into Archer and Wise Counties)
- Perrin-Whitt Consolidated Independent School District (also extends into Palo Pinto and Parker Counties)

=== Knox County ===
- Benjamin Independent School District
- Knox City-O'Brien Consolidated Independent School District (also extends into Haskell County)
- Munday Consolidated Independent School District (also extends into Haskell and Throckmorton Counties)

=== Montague County ===
- Bowie Independent School District (also extends into Clay, Jack and Wise Counties)
- Forestburg Independent School District
- Gold-Burg Independent School District (also extends into Clay County)
- Montague Independent School District
- Nocona Independent School District
- Prairie Valley Independent School District
- Saint Jo Independent School District (also extends into Cooke County)

=== Throckmorton County ===
- Throckmorton Collegiate Independent School District
- Woodson Independent School District (also extends into Stephens and Young Counties)

=== Wichita County ===
- Burkburnett Independent School District (also extends into Clay County)
- City View Independent School District
- Electra Independent School District
- Iowa Park Consolidated Independent School District (also extends into Archer County)
- Wichita Falls Independent School District

=== Wilbarger County ===
- Harrold Independent School District
- Northside Independent School District
- Vernon Independent School District (also extends into Foard County)

=== Young County ===
- Graham Independent School District (also extends into Stephens County
- Newcastle Independent School District
- Olney Independent School District (also extends into Archer, Baylor and Throckmorton Counties)

== Region 10 ==
=== Collin County ===
- Allen Independent School District
- Anna Independent School District
- Blue Ridge Independent School District (also extends into Fannin County)
- Celina Independent School District (also extends into Denton and Grayson Counties)
- Community Independent School District (also extends into Hunt County)
- Farmersville Independent School District
- Frisco Independent School District (also extends into Denton County)
- Lovejoy Independent School District
- McKinney Independent School District
- Melissa Independent School District
- Plano Independent School District
- Princeton Independent School District
- Prosper Independent School District (also extends into Denton County)
- Wylie Independent School District

=== Dallas County ===
- Carrollton-Farmers Branch Independent School District (also extends into Denton County)
- Cedar Hill Independent School District
- Coppell Independent School District
- Dallas Independent School District
- DeSoto Independent School District
- Duncanville Independent School District
- Garland Independent School District
- Grand Prairie Independent School District
- Highland Park Independent School District
- Irving Independent School District
- Lancaster Independent School District
- Mesquite Independent School District
- Richardson Independent School District
- Sunnyvale Independent School District

=== Ellis County ===
- Avalon Independent School District
- Ennis Independent School District (also extends into Navarro County)
- Ferris Independent School District (also extends into Dallas County)
- Italy Independent School District
- Maypearl Independent School District
- Midlothian Independent School District
- Milford Independent School District (also extends into Hill County)
- Palmer Independent School District
- Red Oak Independent School District
- Waxahachie Independent School District

=== Fannin County ===
- Bonham Independent School District
- Dodd City Independent School District
- Ector Independent School District
- Leonard Independent School District (also extends into Collin and Hunt Counties)
- Sam Rayburn Independent School District
- Savoy Independent School District
- Trenton Independent School District (also extends into Collin and Grayson Counties)

=== Grayson County ===
- Bells Independent School District
- Collinsville Independent School District (also extends into Cooke County)
- Denison Independent School District
- Gunter Independent School District (also extends into Collin County)
- Howe Independent School District
- Pottsboro Independent School District
- S and S Consolidated Independent School District
- Sherman Independent School District
- Tioga Independent School District
- Tom Bean Independent School District
- Van Alstyne Independent School District (also extends into Collin County)
- Whitesboro Independent School District (also extends into Cooke County)
- Whitewright Independent School District (also extends into Collin and Fannin Counties)

=== Henderson County ===
- Athens Independent School District (also extends into Anderson and Van Zandt Counties)

=== Hunt County ===
- Bland Independent School District (also extends into Collin County)
- Boles Independent School District
- Caddo Mills Independent School District
- Campbell Independent School District
- Celeste Independent School District
- Commerce Independent School District (also extends into Delta County)
- Greenville Independent School District
- Lone Oak Independent School District (also extends into Rains County)
- Quinlan Independent School District (also extends into Kaufman County)
- Wolfe City Independent School District (also extends into Fannin County)

=== Kaufman County ===
- Crandall Independent School District
- Forney Independent School District
- Kaufman Independent School District
- Kemp Independent School District (also extends into Henderson County)
- Mabank Independent School District (also extends into Henderson and Van Zandt Counties)
- Scurry-Rosser Independent School District
- Terrell Independent School District (also extends into Hunt County)

=== Rockwall County ===
- Rockwall Independent School District (also extends into Collin and Kaufman Counties)
- Royse City Independent School District (also extends into Collin and Hunt Counties)

=== Van Zandt ===
- Canton Independent School District
- Wills Point Independent School District (also extends into Kaufman County)

== Region 11 ==
=== Cooke County ===
- Callisburg Independent School District
- Era Independent School District (also extends into Denton County)
- Gainesville Independent School District
- Lindsay Independent School District
- Muenster Independent School District
- Sivells Bend Independent School District
- Valley View Independent School District
- Walnut Bend Independent School District

=== Denton County ===
- Argyle Independent School District
- Aubrey Independent School District
- Denton Independent School District
- Krum Independent School District (also extends into Wise County)
- Lake Dallas Independent School District
- Lewisville Independent School District (also extends into Tarrant County)
- Little Elm Independent School District
- Northwest Independent School District (also extends into Tarrant and Wise Counties)
- Pilot Point Independent School District (also extends into Cooke and Grayson Counties)
- Ponder Independent School District
- Sanger Independent School District

=== Erath County ===
- Bluff Dale Independent School District (also extends into Hood County)
- Dublin Independent School District (also extends into Comanche County)
- Huckabay Independent School District (also extends into Eastland County)
- Lingleville Independent School District (also extends into Comanche and Eastland Counties)
- Morgan Mill Independent School District
- Stephenville Independent School District
- Three Way Independent School District (also extends into Somervell County)

=== Hood County ===
- Granbury Independent School District (also extends into Johnson, Parker and Somervell Counties)
- Lipan Independent School District (also extends into Erath, Palo Pinto and Parker Counties)
- Tolar Independent School District

=== Johnson County ===
- Alvarado Independent School District
- Burleson Independent School District (also extends into Tarrant County)
- Cleburne Independent School District
- Godley Independent School District (also extends into Hood and Tarrant Counties)
- Grandview Independent School District (also extends into Hill County)
- Joshua Independent School District
- Keene Independent School District
- Rio Vista Independent School District (also extends into Hill County)
- Venus Independent School District

=== Palo Pinto County ===
- Gordon Independent School District (also extends into Erath County)
- Graford Independent School District (also extends into Jack County)
- Mineral Wells Independent School District (also extends into Parker County)
- Palo Pinto Independent School District
- Santo Independent School District (also extends into Erath County)
- Strawn Independent School District

=== Parker County ===
- Aledo Independent School District (also extends into Tarrant County)
- Brock Independent School District
- Garner Independent School District
- Millsap Independent School District (also extends into Palo Pinto County)
- Peaster Independent School District
- Poolville Independent School District (also extends into Wise County)
- Springtown Independent School District (also extends into Wise County)
- Weatherford Independent School District

=== Somervell County ===
- Glen Rose Independent School District (also extends into Hood County)

=== Tarrant County ===
- Arlington Independent School District
- Azle Independent School District (also extends into Parker and Wise Counties)
- Birdville Independent School District
- Carroll Independent School District
- Castleberry Independent School District
- Crowley Independent School District (also extends into Johnson County)
- Eagle Mountain-Saginaw Independent School District
- Everman Independent School District
- Fort Worth Independent School District
- Grapevine-Colleyville Independent School District (also extends into Dallas County)
- Hurst-Euless-Bedford Independent School District
- Keller Independent School District
- Kennedale Independent School District
- Lake Worth Independent School District
- Mansfield Independent School District (also extends into Johnson County)
- White Settlement Independent School District

=== Wise County ===
- Alvord Independent School District (also extends into Montague County)
- Boyd Independent School District
- Bridgeport Independent School District
- Chico Independent School District
- Decatur Independent School District
- Paradise Independent School District
- Slidell Independent School District (also extends into Cooke, Denton and Montague Counties)

== Region 12 ==
=== Bell County ===
- Academy Independent School District
- Belton Independent School District
- Holland Independent School District (also extends into Milam County)
- Killeen Independent School District (also extends into Coryell County)
- Rogers Independent School District (also extends into Milam County)
- Salado Independent School District
- Temple Independent School District
- Troy Independent School District (also extends into Falls County)

=== Bosque County ===
- Clifton Independent School District (also extends into Coryell County)
- Cranfills Gap Independent School District (also extends into Hamilton County)
- Iredell Independent School District (also extends into Erath County)
- Kopperl Independent School District
- Meridian Independent School District
- Morgan Independent School District
- Valley Mills Independent School District (also extends into Coryell and McLennan Counties)
- Walnut Springs Independent School District (also extends into Somervell County)

=== Coryell County ===
- Copperas Cove Independent School District (also extends into Bell County)
- Evant Independent School District (also extends into Hamilton and Lampasas Counties)
- Jonesboro Independent School District (also extends into Bosque and Hamilton Counties)
- Gatesville Independent School District (also extends into Bell County)
- Oglesby Independent School District (also extends into McLennan County)

=== Falls County ===
- Chilton Independent School District
- Marlin Independent School District
- Rosebud-Lott Independent School District (also extends into Bell and Milam Counties)
- Westphalia Independent School District

=== Freestone County ===
- Dew Independent School District
- Fairfield Independent School District (also extends into Navarro County)
- Teague Independent School District
- Wortham Independent School District (also extends into Limestone and Navarro Counties)

=== Hamilton County ===
- Hamilton Independent School District (also extends into Comanche and Mills Counties)
- Hico Independent School District (also extends into Bosque, Comanche and Erath Counties)

=== Hill County ===
- Abbott Independent School District
- Aquilla Independent School District
- Blum Independent School District
- Bynum Independent School District (also extends into Navarro County)
- Covington Independent School District
- Hillsboro Independent School District
- Hubbard Independent School District (also extends into Limestone and Navarro Counties)
- Itasca Independent School District
- Malone Independent School District
- Mount Calm Independent School District (also extends into Limestone County)
- Penelope Independent School District
- Whitney Independent School District

=== Lampasas County ===
- Lampasas Independent School District (also extends into Bell, Burnet and Coryell Counties)
- Lometa Independent School District (also extends into Mills County)

=== Limestone County ===
- Coolidge Independent School District
- Groesbeck Independent School District (also extends into Falls and Robertson Counties)
- Mexia Independent School District (also extends into Freestone County)

=== McLennan County ===
- Axtell Independent School District (also extends into Hill and Limestone Counties)
- Bosqueville Independent School District
- Bruceville-Eddy Independent School District (also extends into Bell and Falls Counties)
- China Spring Independent School District (also extends into Bosque County)
- Connally Independent School District
- Crawford Independent School District (also extends into Coryell County)
- Gholson Independent School District
- Hallsburg Independent School District
- La Vega Independent School District
- Lorena Independent School District (also extends into Falls County)
- Mart Independent School District (also extends into Falls and Limestone Counties)
- McGregor Independent School District
- Midway Independent School District
- Moody Independent School District (also extends into Bell and Coryell Counties)
- Riesel Independent School District (also extends into Falls County)
- Robinson Independent School District (also extends into Falls County)
- Waco Independent School District
- West Independent School District (also extends into Hill County)

=== Milam County ===
- Buckholts Independent School District

=== Mills County ===
- Goldthwaite Independent School District (also extends into Hamilton and Lampasas Counties)
- Mullin Independent School District (also extends into Brown and Comanche Counties)
- Priddy Independent School District (also extends into Comanche County)

=== Navarro County ===
- Blooming Grove Independent School District
- Corsicana Independent School District (also extends into Freestone County)
- Dawson Independent School District (also extends into Hill County)
- Frost Independent School District (also extends into Ellis and Hill Counties)
- Kerens Independent School District
- Mildred Independent School District
- Rice Independent School District

== Region 13 ==
=== Bastrop County ===
- Bastrop Independent School District
- Elgin Independent School District (also extends into Lee and Travis Counties)
- McDade Independent School District
- Smithville Independent School District (also extends into Fayette County)

=== Bell County ===
- Bartlett Independent School District (also extends into Milam and Williamson Counties)

=== Blanco County ===
- Blanco Independent School District (also extends into Hays and Kendall Counties)
- Johnson City Independent School District (also extends into Hays, Llano and Travis Counties)

=== Burnet County ===
- Burnet Consolidated Independent School District (also extends into Llano and Williamson Counties)
- Marble Falls Independent School District (also extends into Travis County)

=== Caldwell County ===
- Lockhart Independent School District
- Luling Independent School District (also extends into Guadalupe County)
- Prairie Lea Independent School District (also extends into Guadalupe County)

=== Fayette County ===
- Flatonia Independent School District
- La Grange Independent School District
- Fayetteville Independent School District
- Round Top-Carmine Independent School District
- Schulenburg Independent School District

=== Gillespie County ===
- Doss Consolidated Common School District (also extends into Mason County)
- Fredericksburg Independent School District (also extends into Blanco and Kendall Counties)
- Harper Independent School District (also extends into Kerr and Kimble Counties)

=== Gonzales County ===
- Gonzales Independent School District (also extends into Caldwell County)
- Nixon-Smiley Consolidated Independent School District (also extends into Guadalupe, Karnes and Wilson Counties)
- Waelder Independent School District (also extends into Caldwell County)

=== Hays County ===
- Dripping Springs Independent School District (also extends into Travis County)
- Hays Consolidated Independent School District (also extends into Caldwell and Travis Counties)
- San Marcos Consolidated Independent School District (also extends into Caldwell and Guadalupe Counties)
- Wimberley Independent School District (also extends into Comal County)

=== Kendall County ===
- Comfort Independent School District (also extends into Kerr County)

=== Lee County ===
- Dime Box Independent School District
- Giddings Independent School District (also extends into Fayette and Washington Counties)
- Lexington Independent School District (also extends into Bastrop, Milam and Williamson Counties)

=== Llano County ===
- Llano Independent School District

=== Milam County ===
- Thorndale Independent School District (also extends into Williamson County)

=== Travis County ===
- Austin Independent School District
- Del Valle Independent School District
- Eanes Independent School District
- Lago Vista Independent School District
- Lake Travis Independent School District
- Manor Independent School District
- Pflugerville Independent School District (also extends into Williamson County)

=== Williamson County ===
- Coupland Independent School District (also extends into Travis County)
- Florence Independent School District (also extends into Bell County)
- Georgetown Independent School District
- Granger Independent School District
- Hutto Independent School District (also extends into Travis County)
- Jarrell Independent School District
- Leander Independent School District (also extends into Travis County)
- Liberty Hill Independent School District
- Round Rock Independent School District (also extends into Travis County)
- Taylor Independent School District
- Thrall Independent School District

== Region 14 ==
=== Callahan County ===
- Baird Independent School District
- Clyde Consolidated Independent School District (also extends into Jones, Shackelford and Taylor Counties)
- Cross Plains Independent School District (also extends into Brown, Coleman and Eastland Counties)
- Eula Independent School District (also extends into Taylor County)

=== Comanche County ===
- Comanche Independent School District (also extends into Mills County)
- De Leon Independent School District (also extends into Eastland and Erath Counties)
- Gustine Independent School District
- Sidney Independent School District

=== Eastland County ===
- Cisco Independent School District (also extends into Callahan County)
- Eastland Independent School District
- Gorman Independent School District (also extends into Comanche County)
- Ranger Independent School District (also extends into Stephens County)
- Rising Star Independent School District (also extends into Brown and Comanche Counties)

=== Fisher County ===
- Roby Consolidated Independent School District (also extends into Jones County)
- Rotan Independent School District (also extends into Kent and Stonewall Counties)

=== Haskell County ===
- Haskell Consolidated Independent School District (also extends into Stonewall County)
- Paint Creek Independent School District (also extends into Jones County)
- Rule Independent School District (also extends into Stonewall County)

=== Jones County ===
- Anson Independent School District
- Hamlin Collegiate Independent School District (also extends into Fisher and Stonewall Counties)
- Hawley Independent School District
- Lueders-Avoca Independent School District (also extends into Shackelford County)
- Stamford Independent School District (also extends into Haskell County)

=== Mitchell County ===
- Colorado Independent School District (also extends into Scurry County)
- Loraine Independent School District
- Westbrook Independent School District

=== Nolan County ===
- Blackwell Consolidated Independent School District (also extends into Coke and Taylor Counties)
- Highland Independent School District
- Roscoe Independent School District (also extends into Fisher, Nolan and Scurry Counties)
- Sweetwater Independent School District (also extends into Fisher County)

=== Scurry County ===
- Hermleigh Independent School District (also extends into Fisher County)
- Ira Independent School District (also extends into Mitchell County)
- Snyder Independent School District (also extends into Kent County)

=== Shackelford County ===
- Albany Independent School District (also extends into Stephens County)
- Moran Independent School District (also extends into Callahan and Stephens County)

=== Stephens County ===
- Breckenridge Independent School District

=== Stonewall County ===
- Aspermont Independent School District

=== Taylor County ===
- Abilene Independent School District (also extends into Jones County)
- Jim Ned Consolidated Independent School District (also extends into Runnels County)
- Merkel Independent School District (also extends into Jones County)
- Trent Independent School District (also extends into Fisher, Jones and Nolan Counties)
- Wylie Independent School District

== Region 15 ==
=== Brown County ===
- Bangs Independent School District (also extends into Coleman County)
- Blanket Independent School District (also extends into Comanche County)
- Brookesmith Independent School District (also extends into Mills County)
- Brownwood Independent School District
- Early Independent School District
- May Independent School District (also extends into Comanche County)
- Zephyr Independent School District (also extends into Comanche and Mills Counties)

=== Coke County ===
- Bronte Independent School District (also extends into Runnels County)
- Robert Lee Independent School District

=== Coleman County ===
- Coleman Independent School District (also extends into Runnels County)
- Panther Creek Consolidated Independent School District (also extends into Runnels County)
- Santa Anna Independent School District

=== Concho County ===
- Eden Consolidated Independent School District (also extends into Menard County)
- Paint Rock Independent School District

=== Crane County ===
- Crane Independent School District

=== Crockett County ===
- Crockett County Consolidated Common School District

=== Edwards County ===
- Rocksprings Independent School District (also extends into Val Verde County)
- Nueces Canyon Consolidated Independent School District (also extends into Real and Uvalde Counties)

=== Irion County ===
- Irion County Independent School District

=== Kimble County ===
- Junction Independent School District

=== Mason County ===
- Mason Independent School District (also extends into Kimble, McCullouch, Menard and San Saba Counties)

=== McCulloch County ===
- Brady Independent School District (also extends into Concho County)
- Lohn Independent School District
- Rochelle Independent School District

=== Menard County ===
- Menard Independent School District

=== Runnels County ===
- Ballinger Independent School District
- Miles Independent School District (also extends into Tom Green County)
- Olfen Independent School District
- Winters Independent School District (also extends into Taylor County)

=== San Saba County ===
- Cherokee Independent School District
- Richland Springs Independent School District
- San Saba Independent School District

=== Schleicher County ===
- Schleicher Independent School District

=== Sterling County ===
- Sterling City Independent School District

=== Sutton County ===
- Sonora Independent School District

=== Tom Green County ===
- Christoval Independent School District
- Grape Creek Independent School District
- San Angelo Independent School District
- Veribest Independent School District
- Wall Independent School District
- Water Valley Independent School District (also extends into Coke County)

=== Val Verde County ===
- Comstock Independent School District
- San Felipe-Del Rio Consolidated Independent School District

== Region 16 ==
=== Armstrong County ===
- Claude Independent School District

=== Briscoe County ===
- Silverton Independent School District

=== Carson County ===
- Groom Independent School District (also extends into Armstrong, Donley and Gray Counties)
- Panhandle Independent School District
- White Deer Independent School District (also extends into Gray County)

=== Castro County ===
- Dimmitt Independent School District
- Hart Independent School District
- Nazareth Independent School District

=== Childress County ===
- Childress Independent School District (also extends into Cottle, Hall and Hardeman Counties)

=== Collingsworth County ===
- Wellington Independent School District (also extends into Childress County)

=== Dallam County ===
- Dalhart Independent School District (also extends into Hartley County)
- Texline Independent School District

=== Deaf Smith County ===
- Hereford Independent School District (also extends into Castro and Parmer Counties)
- Walcott Independent School District

=== Donley County ===
- Clarendon Independent School District (also extends into Armstrong and Briscoe Counties)
- Hedley Independent School District (also extends into Collingsworth County)

=== Gray County ===
- Grandview-Hopkins Independent School District
- Lefors Independent School District
- McLean Independent School District (also extends into Collingsworth, Donley and Wheeler Counties)
- Pampa Independent School District (also extends into Roberts County)

=== Hall County ===
- Memphis Independent School District (also extends into Childress, Collingsworth and Donley Counties)
- Turkey-Quitaque Independent School District (also extends into Briscoe, Floyd and Motley Counties)

=== Hansford County ===
- Gruver Independent School District (also extends into Sherman County)
- Pringle-Morse Consolidated Independent School District (also extends into Hutchinson, Moore and Sherman Counties)
- Spearman Independent School District (also extends into Hutchinson and Ochiltree Counties)

=== Hartley County ===
- Channing Independent School District (also extends into Oldham County)
- Hartley Independent School District

=== Hemphill County ===
- Canadian Independent School District (also extends into Lipscomb County)

=== Hutchinson County ===
- Borger Independent School District
- Plemons-Stinnett-Phillips Consolidated Independent School District
- Sanford-Fritch Independent School District (also extends into Carson and Moore Counties)
- Spring Creek Independent School District

=== Lipscomb County ===
- Booker Independent School District (also extends into Hemphill and Ochiltree Counties)
- Darrouzett Independent School District
- Follett Independent School District

=== Moore County ===
- Dumas Independent School District
- Sunray Independent School District (also extends into Sherman County)

=== Ochiltree County ===
- Perryton Independent School District

=== Oldham County ===
- Adrian Independent School District (also extends into Deaf Smith County)
- Boys Ranch Independent School District
- Vega Independent School District (also extends into Deaf Smith County)
- Wildorado Independent School District (also extends into Deaf Smith and Randall Counties)

=== Parmer County ===
- Bovina Independent School District
- Farwell Independent School District (also extends into Bailey County)
- Friona Independent School District (also extends into Deaf Smith County)
- Lazbuddie Independent School District (also extends into Castro County)

=== Potter County ===
- Amarillo Independent School District (also extends into Randall County)
- Bushland Independent School District (also extends into Randall County)
- Highland Park Independent School District
- River Road Independent School District

=== Randall County ===
- Canyon Independent School District

=== Roberts County ===
- Miami Independent School District (also extends into Gray County)

=== Sherman County ===
- Stratford Independent School District (also extends into Dallam County)
- Texhoma Independent School District (also extends into Hansford County)

=== Swisher County ===
- Happy Independent School District (also extends into Armstrong, Castro and Randall Counties)
- Kress Independent School District
- Tulia Independent School District

=== Wheeler County ===
- Fort Elliott Consolidated Independent School District (also extends into Gray and Hemphill Counties)
- Kelton Independent School District
- Shamrock Independent School District (also extends into Collingsworth County)
- Wheeler Independent School District (also extends into Gray County)

== Region 17 ==
=== Bailey County ===
- Muleshoe Independent School District

=== Borden County ===
- Borden County Independent School District (also extends into Howard County)

=== Cochran County ===
- Morton Independent School District
- Whiteface Consolidated Independent School District (also extends into Hockley and Lamb Counties)

=== Cottle County ===
- Paducah Independent School District

=== Crosby County ===
- Crosbyton Consolidated Independent School District (also extends into Garza County)
- Lorenzo Independent School District (also extends into Lubbock County)
- Ralls Independent School District

=== Dawson County ===
- Dawson Independent School District (also extends into Lynn and Terry Counties)
- Klondike Independent School District (also extends into Martin County)
- Lamesa Independent School District
- Sands Consolidated Independent School District (also extends into Borden, Howard and Martin Counties)

=== Dickens County ===
- Patton Springs Independent School District
- Spur Independent School District (also extends into Kent County)

=== Floyd County ===
- Floydada Independent School District
- Lockney Independent School District (also extends into Hale County)

=== Gaines County ===
- Loop Independent School District (also extends into Terry County)
- Seagraves Independent School District (also extends into Terry and Yoakum Counties)
- Seminole Independent School District

=== Garza County ===
- Post Independent School District (also extends into Kent and Lynn Counties)
- Southland Independent School District (also extends into Lubbock and Lynn Counties)

=== Hale County ===
- Abernathy Independent School District (also extends into Lubbock County)
- Cotton Center Independent School District
- Hale Center Independent School District
- Petersburg Independent School District (also extends into Crosby and Floyd Counties)
- Plainview Independent School District (also extends into Floyd County)

=== Hockley County ===
- Anton Independent School District (also extends into Lamb County)
- Levelland Independent School District
- Ropes Independent School District (also extends into Terry County)
- Smyer Independent School District
- Sundown Independent School District
- Whitharral Independent School District

=== Kent County ===
- Jayton-Girard Independent School District

=== King County ===
- Guthrie Common School District

=== Lamb County ===
- Amherst Independent School District
- Littlefield Independent School District
- Olton Independent School District (also extends into Hale County)
- Springlake-Earth Independent School District (also extends into Castro County)
- Sudan Independent School District (also extends into Bailey and Cochran Counties)

=== Lubbock County ===
- Frenship Independent School District (also extends into Hockley County)
- Idalou Independent School District
- Lubbock Independent School District
- Lubbock-Cooper Independent School District
- New Deal Independent School District
- Roosevelt Independent School District
- Shallowater Independent School District
- Slaton Independent School District (also extends into Lynn County)

=== Lynn County ===
- New Home Independent School District
- O'Donnell Independent School District (also extends into Dawson and Terry Counties)
- Tahoka Independent School District (also extends into Terry County)
- Wilson Independent School District

=== Motley County ===
- Motley County Independent School District (also extends into Floyd County)

=== Terry County ===
- Brownfield Independent School District (also extends into Yoakum County)
- Meadow Independent School District
- Wellman-Union Consolidated Independent School District (also extends into Gaines County)

=== Yoakum County ===
- Denver City Independent School District
- Plains Independent School District

== Region 18 ==
=== Andrews County ===
- Andrews Independent School District

=== Brewster County ===
- Alpine Independent School District
- Marathon Independent School District
- San Vicente Independent School District
- Terlingua Common School District

=== Culberson County ===
- Culberson County-Allamoore Independent School District (also extends into Hudspeth County)

=== Ector County ===
- Ector County Independent School District

=== Glasscock County ===
- Glasscock County Independent School District

=== Howard County ===
- Big Spring Independent School District
- Coahoma Independent School District
- Forsan Independent School District (also extends into Mitchell County)

=== Jeff Davis County ===
- Fort Davis Independent School District
- Valentine Independent School District

=== Martin County ===
- Grady Independent School District
- Stanton Independent School District (also extends into Howard County)

=== Midland County ===
- Greenwood Independent School District
- Midland Independent School District

=== Pecos County ===
- Buena Vista Independent School District
- Fort Stockton Independent School District
- Iraan-Sheffield Independent School District

=== Presidio County ===
- Marfa Independent School District
- Presidio Independent School District

=== Reagan County ===
- Reagan County Independent School District

=== Reeves County ===
- Balmorhea Independent School District
- Pecos-Barstow-Toyah Independent School District (also extends into Ward County)

=== Terrell County ===
- Terrell County Independent School District

=== Upton County ===
- McCamey Independent School District
- Rankin Independent School District

=== Ward County ===
- Grandfalls-Royalty Independent School District
- Monahans-Wickett-Pyote Independent School District

=== Winkler County ===
- Kermit Independent School District
- Wink-Loving Independent School District (also extends into Loving County)

== Region 19 ==
=== El Paso County ===
- Anthony Independent School District
- Canutillo Independent School District
- Clint Independent School District
- El Paso Independent School District
- Fabens Independent School District
- San Elizario Independent School District
- Socorro Independent School District
- Tornillo Independent School District
- Ysleta Independent School District

=== Hudspeth County ===
- Dell City Independent School District
- Fort Hancock Independent School District
- Sierra Blanca Independent School District

== Region 20 ==
=== Atascosa County ===
- Charlotte Independent School District (also extends into Frio County)
- Jourdanton Independent School District
- Lytle Independent School District (also extends into Medina County)
- Pleasanton Independent School District
- Poteet Independent School District

=== Bandera County ===
- Bandera Independent School District
- Medina Independent School District (also extends into Kerr County)

=== Bexar County ===
- Alamo Heights Independent School District
- East Central Independent School District
- Edgewood Independent School District
- Fort Sam Houston Independent School District
- Harlandale Independent School District
- Judson Independent School District
- Lackland Independent School District
- North East Independent School District
- Northside Independent School District (also extends into Bandera and Medina Counties)
- Randolph Field Independent School District
- San Antonio Independent School District
- Somerset Independent School District (also extends into Atascosa County)
- South San Antonio Independent School District
- Southside Independent School District
- Southwest Independent School District

=== Comal County ===
- Comal Independent School District (also extends into Bexar, Guadalupe, Hays and Kendall Counties)
- New Braunfels Independent School District (also extends into Guadalupe County)

=== Dimmit County ===
- Carrizo Springs Consolidated Independent School District

=== Frio County ===
- Dilley Independent School District (also extends into La Salle County)
- Pearsall Independent School District

=== Guadalupe County ===
- Marion Independent School District
- Navarro Independent School District
- Seguin Independent School District
- Schertz-Cibolo-Universal City Independent School District (also extends into Bexar County)

=== Karnes County ===
- Falls City Independent School District (also extends into Wilson County)
- Karnes City Independent School District (also extends into Atascosa County)

=== Kendall County ===
- Boerne Independent School District (also extends into Bexar and Comal Counties)

=== Kerr County ===
- Center Point Independent School District
- Divide Independent School District
- Hunt Independent School District
- Ingram Independent School District
- Kerrville Independent School District

=== Kinney County ===
- Brackett Independent School District

=== La Salle County ===
- Cotulla Independent School District

=== Maverick County ===
- Eagle Pass Independent School District

=== Medina County ===
- D'Hanis Independent School District
- Devine Independent School District (also extends into Frio County)
- Hondo Independent School District (also extends into Frio County)
- Medina Valley Independent School District (also extends into Bexar County)
- Natalia Independent School District

=== Real County ===
- Leakey Independent School District (also extends into Uvalde County)

=== Uvalde County ===
- Knippa Independent School District
- Sabinal Independent School District
- Utopia Independent School District (also extends into Bandera, Medina and Real Counties)
- Uvalde Consolidated Independent School District (also extends into Real and Zavala Counties)

=== Wilson County ===
- Floresville Independent School District (also extends into Bexar County)
- La Vernia Independent School District (also extends into Guadalupe County)
- Poth Independent School District
- Stockdale Independent School District

=== Zavala County ===
- Crystal City Independent School District
- La Pryor Independent School District

== Defunct school districts ==
During Texas' history, many school districts have been abolished, closed, or consolidated with or into other districts.

- Addicks Independent School District (divided between the Katy Independent School District, Houston Independent School District, and Spring Branch Independent School District)
- Addison Independent School District (became a part of the Dallas Independent School District)
- Allamoore Independent School District (formerly named Allamoore Consolidated Independent School District until July 1, 1992; consolidated with Culberson County Independent School District to form Culberson County-Allamoore Independent School District on July 1, 1995)
- Alanreed Independent School District (abolished on July 1, 1993)
- Allison Independent School District (consolidated with Fort Elliott Independent School District on July 1, 2003)
- Alton Independent School District (merged with Mission ISD to form Mission Consolidated Independent School District on January 27, 1975)
- Asherton Independent School District (consolidated with Carrizo Springs Independent School District on July 1, 1999)
- Blackwell Independent School District (consolidated to Divide Independent School District (Nolan County) to form Blackwell Consolidated Independent School District on September 1, 1985)
- Bledsoe Independent School District (consolidated with Whiteface Consolidated Independent School District on July 1, 1996)
- Briscoe Independent School District (consolidated with Mobeetie Independent School District to form Fort Elliott Consolidated Independent School District on August 10, 1991)
- Bronson Independent School District (merged with Pineland ISD to form the West Sabine Independent School District)
- Byers Independent School District (consolidated with Petrolia Independent School District to from Petrolia Independent School District on May 25, 2012)
- Carbon Independent School District (annexed to Eastland Independent School District on July 1, 1990)
- Carta Valley Independent School District](annexed to Rocksprings Independent School District on April 30, 1985)
- Culberson County Independent School District (consolidated with Allamoore Independent School District to form Culberson County-Allamoore Independent School District on July 1, 1995)
- Delmar Independent School District (consolidated with West Lamar Independent School District to form Delmar-West Lamar Consolidated Independent School District on July 1, 1985)
- Delmar-West Lamar Consolidated Independent School District (renamed Chisum Independent School District on August 21, 1986)
- Divide Common School District (reclassified as Divide Independent School District on July 1, 1988)
- Divide Independent School District (Nolan County, Texas)|Divide Independent School district (Nolan County) (consolidated to Blackwell Independent School District to form Blackwell Consolidated Independent School District on September 1, 1985)
- Dougherty Independent School District(annexed to Floydada Independent School District on July 1, 1987)
- Eola Independent School District (consolidated with Eden Consolidated Independent School District on September 1, 1983)
- Estelline Independent School District(annexed to Childress Independent School District on July 1, 1985, declared a dormant school district on July 1, 1987, and annexed to Memphis Independent School District on July 1, 1989)
- Etoile Independent School District (annexed to Woden Independent School District on July 1, 2022)
- Fannett Independent School District (merged with Hamshire-New Holland Independent School District in 1961 to form the Hamshire-Fannett Independent School District)
- Goree Independent School District (consolidated with Munday Independent School District to form Munday Consolidated Independent School District)
- Hamshire-New Holland Independent School District(merged with Fannett Independent School District in 1961 to form the Hamshire-Fannett Independent School District)
- Higgins Independent School District (consolidated with Canadian Independent School District on July 1, 2020)
- Hobbs Independent School District (annexed to Roby Independent School District, Rotan Independent School District, and Snyder Independent School District on July 1, 1990)
- Honey Grove Independent School District (consolidated with Windom Independent School District and renamed Honey Grove Consolidated Independent School District on July 1, 1987)
- Juno Independent School District (consolidated with Comstock Independent School District on July 1, 1992)
- Kendleton Independent School District (annexed to Lamar Consolidated Independent School District in March 25, 2010)
- La Marque Independent School District (annexed to Texas City Independent School District on July 1, 2016)
- Lakeview Independent School District (consolidated with Memphis Independent School District on July 1, 2000)
- Laureles Independent School District (annexed to Riviera Independent School District on July 1, 1993)
- Lela Independent School District (closed on July 1, 1991 with the education services in the area provided by Samnorwood Independent School District and Shamrock Independent School District, and annexed into the latter district on July 1, 1992)

Liberty Chapel Independent School District]] (annexed to Cleburne Independent School District on July 1, 1988)

- Lillian Independent School District (annexed to Alvarado Independent School District on July 1, 1986)
- Marietta Independent School District (consolidated with Pewitt Independent School District to form Pewitt Consolidated Independent School District on September 1, 2008)
- Masonic Home Independent School District (closed on April 29, 2005, effective August 31, 2005; the district served a Masonic-operated children's home which was closed and the property sold, the property is now part of the Fort Worth Independent School District)
- Maydelle Independent School District(annexed to Rusk Independent School District on July 1, 1989)
- McAdoo Independent School District (annexed to Crosbyton Independent School District, Rusk Independent School District, and Spur Independent School District on July 1, 1985)
- McCauley Independent School District (consolidated with Roby Independent School District on July 1, 1990)
- McFaddin Independent School District (consolidated with Refugio Independent School District on July 1, 1994)
- Megargel Independent School District (consolidated with Olney Independent School District on July 1, 2006)
- Mirando City Independent School District (consolidated with Webb Consolidated Independent School District on July 1, 2005)
- Missouri City Independent School District (merged with Sugar Land ISD into Fort Bend Independent School District)
- Mobeetie Independent School District(consolidated with Briscoe Independent School District to form Fort Elliott Consolidated Independent School District on August 10, 1991)
- Mozelle Independent School District (consolidated with Talpa Independent School District and renamed Panther Creek Independent School District on July 1, 1986)
- Munday Independent School District (consolidated with Goree Independent School District to form Munday Consolidated Independent School District)
- North Forest Independent School District (annexed to Houston Independent School District on July 1, 2013)
- North Houston Independent School District (dissolved and split between Aldine ISD, Cypress-Fairbanks ISD, and Klein ISD in 1949)
- Novice Independent School District (consolidated with Coleman Independent School District on March 1, 2013)
- Old Glory Independent School District (annexed to Aspermont Independent School District on July 1, 1985)
- Petrolia Independent School District (consolidated with Byers Independent School District to from Petrolia Independent School District on May 25, 2012)
- Pewitt Independent School District (consolidated with Marietta Independent School District to form Pewitt Consolidated Independent School District on September 1, 2008)
- Phillips Independent School District(consolidated with Plemons Independent School District and Stinnet Independent School District and renamed Plemons-Stinnet-Phillips Independent School District on July 1, 1987)
- Pineland Independent School District (merged with Bronson ISD to form the West Sabine Independent School District)
- Pleasant Grove Independent School District (Dallas County, Texas)|Pleasant Grove Independent School District (Dallas County, became a part of the Dallas Independent School District)
- Plemons Independent School District]] (consolidated with Phillips Independent School Districtand Stinnet Independent School District and renamed Plemons-Stinnet-Phillips Independent School District]] on July 1, 1987)
- Port Neches Independent School District (renamed Port Neches-Groves Independent School District on July 1, 1991)
- Pottsville Independent School District (annexed to Hamilton Independent School District on July 1, 1989)
- Rochester County Line Independent School District (consolidated with Haskell Consolidated Independent School District on July 1, 2005)
- Roscoe Independent School District (changed name to Roscoe Collegiate Independent School District on October 22, 2012)
- Rosen Heights Independent School District (renamed Lake Worth Independent School District in 1959)
- Roxton Independent School District (consolidated with Chisum Independent School District on July 1, 2019)
- Samnorwood Independent School District (annexed to Wellington Independent School District on July 2, 2012)
- Santa Cruz Independent School District (annexed to London Independent School District on July 1, 1991)
- Star Independent School District (consolidated with Goldthwaite Independent School District on July 1, 2014)
- Seagoville Independent School District (became a part of the Dallas Independent School District)
- Smiley Independent School District (consolidated with Nixon-Smiley Consolidated Independent School District on September 1, 1983)
- South Park Independent School District (consolidated with Beaumont Independent School District on July 1, 1984)
- South Plains Independent School District (annexed to Floydada Independent School District on July 1, 1988)
- Spade Independent School District (consolidated with Olton Independent School District on July 1, 2006)
- Stinnet Independent School District (consolidated with Phillips Independent School Districtand Plemons Independent School District and renamed Plemons-Stinnet-Phillips Independent School District on July 1, 1987)
- Sugar Land Independent School District (merged with Missouri City ISD into Fort Bend Independent School District)
- Talpa Independent School District (consolidated with Mozelle Independent School District and renamed Panther Creek Independent School District on July 1, 1986)
- Three Way Independent School District (Bailey County) (consolidated with Sudan Independent School District on July 1, 2002)
- Three Way Independent School District (Erath County) (reclassified as an independent school district on July 1, 1988)
- Waka Independent School District (consolidated with Perryton Independent School District on September 9, 1990)
- Weinert Independent School District (consolidated with Haskell Independent School District on July 1, 1990)
- Wellman Independent School District(consolidated with Union Independent School District to form Wellman-Union Consolidated Independent School District on July 1, 1997)
- West Lamar Independent School District(consolidated with Delmar Independent School District to form Delmar-West Lamar Consolidated Independent School District on July 1, 1985)
- Westminster Independent School District (annexed to Anna Independent School District on July 1, 1989)
- White Oak Independent School District (Harris County, Texas)|White Oak Independent School District(split between Aldine ISD and Houston ISD in 1937; not to be confused with the existing White Oak Independent School District in Northeast Texas) in White Oak, Tx in Gregg County.
- Wilmer-Hutchins Independent School District (annexed to Dallas Independent School District on July 1, 2006)
- Windom Independent School District (consolidated with Honey Grove Independent School District and renamed Honey Grove Consolidated Independent School District on July 1, 1987)
- Winfield Independent School District (annexed to Mount Pleasant Independent School District on July 1, 2018)
- Wingate Independent School District (annexed to Winters Independent School District on July 1, 1991)

== See also ==
- Education in Texas#Primary and secondary education
- List of high schools in Texas
- Texas Education Agency
