= Delmar Independent School District =

Defunct school district in Texas

Delmar Independent School District (DISD) was a public school district based in Lamar and Delta counties in North Texas established in 1941. It consolidated with the West Lamar Independent School District into the Delmar-West Lamar CISD.

The name Delmar is a portmanteau of Delta and Lamar, for the two counties it was based in.

== History ==
=== Formation ===
Delmar ISD was created by the 1941 consolidation of the Howland Independent School District and Midway District No.25 and later the Lake Creek School District No.25 of Delta County.

In 1948, a $115,000 public bond election occurred.

It later annexed surrounding Lamar County districts in 1948, bringing it to an area of 103 miles squared with an enrollment of 750 in the fall of 1952.

In 1952, it ran an elementary school and planned on building a colored school south of Paris on the Texas State Highway 24, south of Paris, Texas, now known as the Old Delmar School. Its other colored school was a 12-grade school.

In 1974, it saw a rise in enrollment and began planning for new construction, as well as offering new courses, including French and Spanish with an active enrollment of 395. It served 133 square miles (340 km^{2}) within Lamar and Delta counties by this time and employed 35 staff.

=== First proposed consolidation ===
In February 1976, consolidation with Paris ISD was considered by the school board due to popular demand, as facilities needed upgrading though the Texas Education Agency had not enforced these since 1973. A meeting of around 100 and continued debate resulted in three factions: those who sought to consolidate with Paris, those who instead favored consolidation with Roxton and West Lamar, and those who wanted to retain the district by passing a bond issue. The Delmar school board voted 3–2 to begin consolidation talks with Paris after a petition signed by 159 people asking the board to consider consolidation.

Those against consolidation, represented by two board members and the superintendent, argued that passing a $175,000 bond and funding a construction program would be fit, as the district had the lowest tax rate in the area, and it was speculated consolidating with Paris's more industrialized and developed boundaries would increase the tax burden of residents of the existing Delmar ISD and would add an additional tax for the upkeep of Paris Junior College.

The district's relatively tax base was at a $5 million land evaluation as opposed to Paris's land evaluation of $61.8 million. Those against consolidation claimed more development was coming Delmar's way in the next few years.

Those who favored consolidation thought it would be better for current Delmar students to go with bigger schools with more adequate facilities and courses, as many complained Lamar lacked sufficient advanced-level courses.

=== Lake Creek CCDD ===
On August 23 of 1976, a meeting of people who favored Delmar independence were to gather. This was after a meeting of 40 Lake Creek residents who called themselves Concerned Citizens of Delmar District appeared August 17 to request the school board let them be annexed into Cooper ISD. CCDD representatives later stated they ultimately wished for the school district to remain intact.

In December 1976, CCDD again requested they be able to be annexed into Cooper ISD. This was postponed again by the Delmar board. The board considered the issue on December 15, 1976, and denied Lake Creek de-annexation. An appeal to the TEA was prepared the decision to deny Lake Creek joining Cooper ISD. In June, the TEA upheld the school board's decision to retain Lake Creek. Lake Creekers complained Cooper ISD offered classes and activities Delmar ISD did not. A further appeal to the Texas Board of Education was denied.

In 1980, its expenditures were $409,000 while its revenues were at $446,000.

In 1985, the Paris ISD superintendent thought Delmar would be willing to consolidate with Paris.

=== Closing ===
It consolidated with the West Lamar Independent School District into the Delmar-West Lamar Consolidated Independent School District (now known as Chisum Independent School District).
