= Port Neches–Groves High School =

Public school in Texas, United States

Port Neches-Groves High School

Location
- 1401 Merriman Street; Port Neches, Texas 77651; United States; 29°59′24″N 93°57′14″W

Information
- Type: Public
- Established: 1925
- School district: Port Neches-Groves ISD
- Superintendent: Mike Gonzales
- Principal: Scott Ryan
- Teaching staff: 116.16 (FTE)
- Enrollment: 1,681 (2023-2024)
- Student to teacher ratio: 14.47
- Colors: Purple and white
- Athletics conference: University Interscholastic League Class 5A
- Mascot: Indians
- Website: pnghs.pngisd.org

Port Neches–Groves High School (PNG) is a public high school located in Port Neches, Texas. It is a part of the Port Neches-Groves Independent School District, and is classified as a 5A school by the UIL, serving portions of Port Neches, Groves, and Port Arthur. It was built in 1925.

== History ==
Port Neches High School, the predecessor to Port Neches–Groves High School, was built in 1925 at a cost of approximately $175,000. The Indian mascot and the purple and white school colors were chosen around this time.

The Indianettes dance team was founded in 1951, with the marching band, "Indian Spirit" mascot, and adoption of the fight song "Cherokee" being implemented over the following decade. A student serving as the drum major, Lynne James née Jeffrey, wrote the lyrics to the fight song. She later became the principal of Port Neches Middle School in the early 2000s.

The current Port Neches High School on Merriman Street was first used in 1953, with the original high school building becoming Port Neches Junior High. The current name of the school was adopted in 1956.

== Athletics ==
The Port Neches-Groves Indians compete in the following sports:

Cross Country, Volleyball, Football, Basketball, Powerlifting, Soccer, Baseball, Softball, Track and Field, Swimming and Diving, Tennis and Golf.

=== State Titles ===
- Baseball
  - 2017(5A)
- Football
  - 1953(3A), 1955(3A), 1975(4A), 2023(5A/D2)
- Volleyball
  - 1971(4A), 1979(4A), 1981(5A)

== Mascot controversy ==
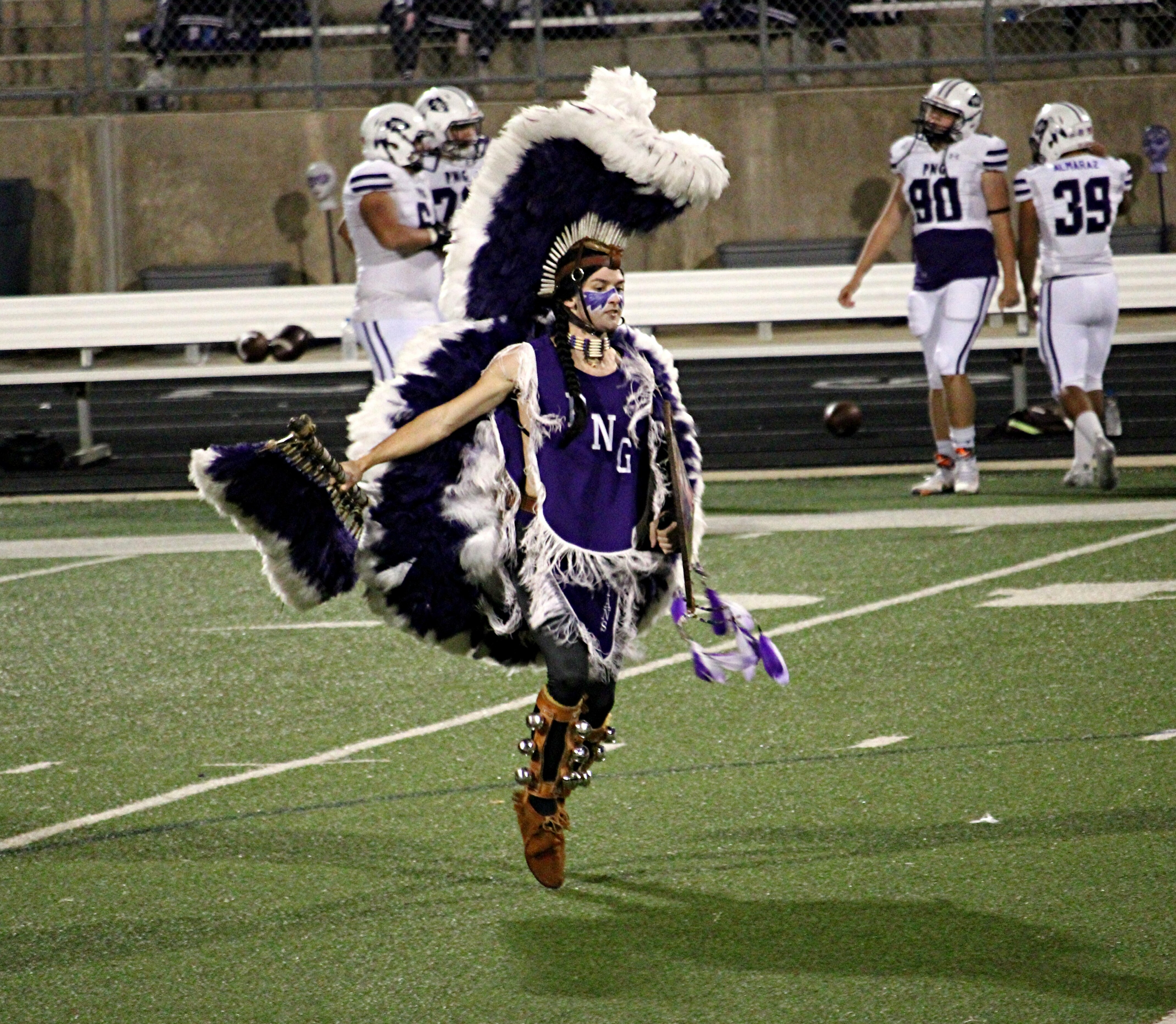
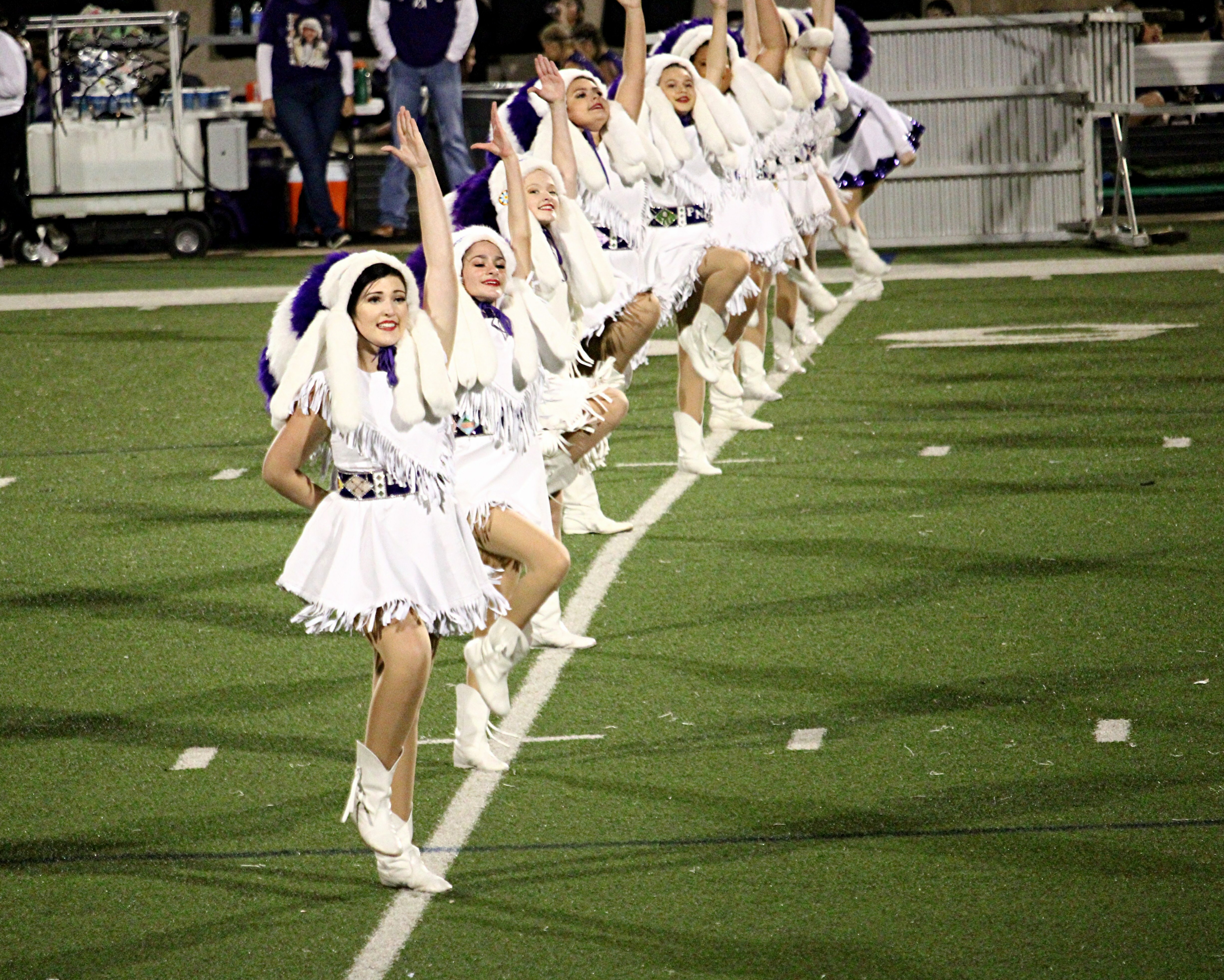
Port Neches–Groves High School students during a half-time performance in December 2020

The high school's "Indian" mascot has garnered controversy for being racist and culturally insensitive, in line with a greater trend in the United States. These depictions include the use of the chant "Scalp 'Em", referring to the school's football field as "the reservation", and cheerleaders crafting and wearing ersatz war bonnets, among others. No residents of Port Neches or Groves identify as solely American Indian. The school administration has repeatedly stated they would not change their traditions or mascot, including turning down a general offer from Adidas to provide free design resources and financial assistance to change the imagery.

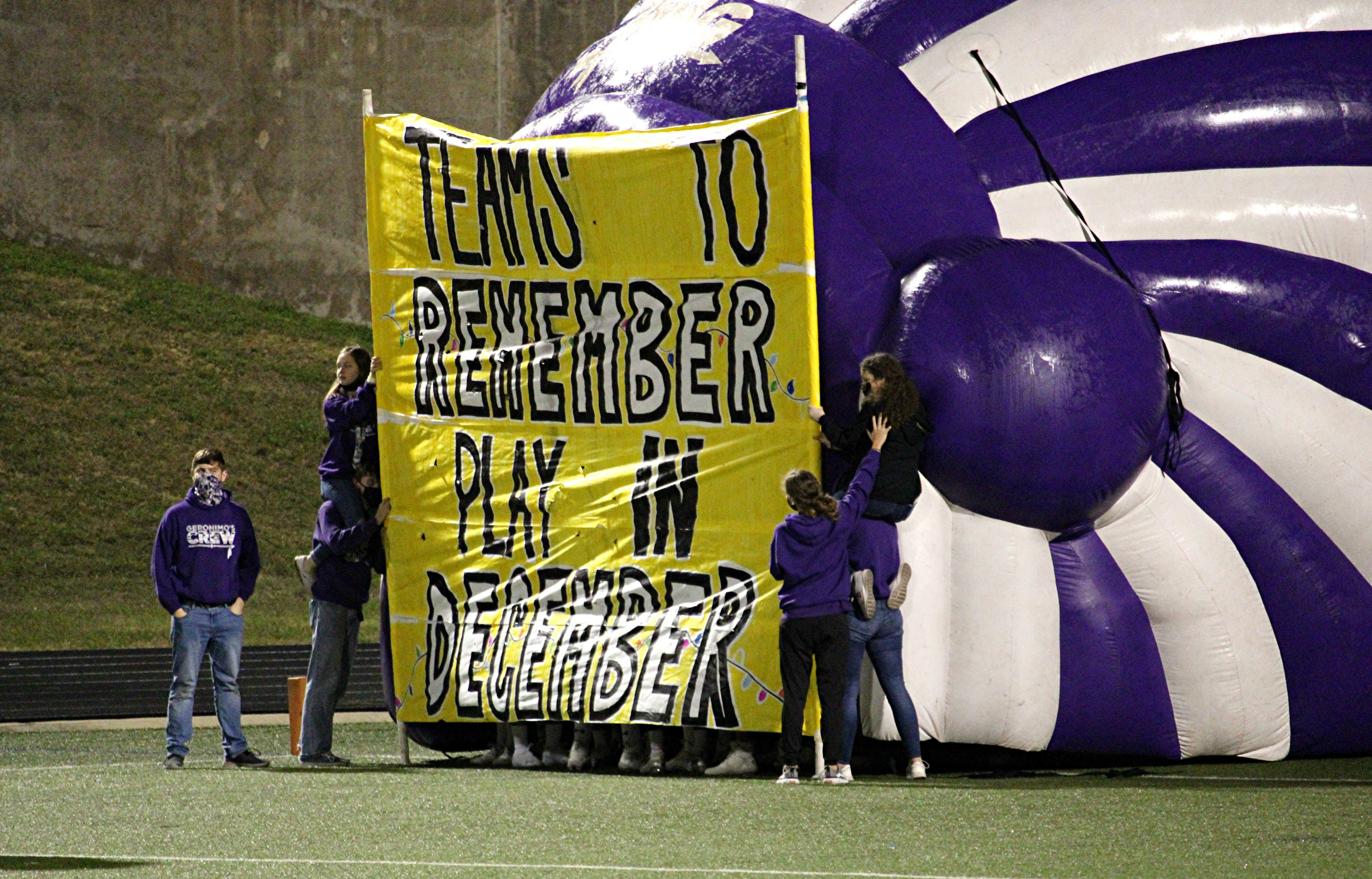
Inflatable war bonnet used for team entrances at football games

In 2020, the Cherokee Nation called for the school to discontinue its use of the mascot. This was a change from a 1979 certificate from then-Principal Chief Ross Swimmer recognizing the high school as "ambassadors of goodwill," with the Principal Chief of the Cherokee Nation Chuck Hoskin Jr. stating that the mascot and imagery "perpetuate inaccurate misconceptions of Native American culture and invokes ideations of savagery which only perpetuates harmful stereotypes and inaccurately depicts our culture."

In March 2022, the school's "Indianettes" drill team chanted the phrase "Scalp 'Em" during a performance at Walt Disney World's Magic Kingdom after being told they would not be allowed to wear their war bonnets. Disney released a statement condemning the performance and stating the Indianettes had not been in the school's audition tape. In the wake of the controversy, the Cherokee Nation renewed its demand that the high school drop the mascot and end its Indian-related traditions. Principal Chief Hoskin stated "I can tell you no Chief of the Cherokee Nation, whether it's me or [...] Chief Swimmer [...] would condone the kind of imagery or depiction of Native peoples that we see PNG not only do, but stubbornly refuse to even consider that those displays are offensive," he said. "They're not authentic. They have no connection to the Cherokee people, in fact, in many ways make a mockery of our wonderful and beautiful traditions." Hoskin's statement was echoed by the Vice-Chair of the Alabama-Coushatta Tribe of Texas, whose original lands would have included the area of Port Neches. The high school has deleted many of its social media accounts.

== Notable alumni ==
- Greg Davis, retired college football coach
- Andrew Dismukes, Saturday Night Live cast member
- Lew Ford, Major League Baseball player
- Lee Hazlewood
- Roschon Johnson, NFL running back for the Chicago Bears
- L.Q. Jones, actor
- Wade Phillips, defensive coordinator, Denver Broncos; former head coach, Dallas Cowboys
- Carson Roccaforte, MLB outfielder
- Tate Sandell, college football placekicker for the Oklahoma Sooners
- Ben Weber, Pitcher, Los Angeles Angels; World Series Champion, Los Angeles Angels

== See also ==
- List of sports team names and mascots derived from indigenous peoples
