= LISD =

LISD is an acronym that may refer to:

- Lichtenstein Institute on Self-Determination at Princeton University
- Independent School Districts in Texas
