= Pewitt High School =

Paul Pewitt High School
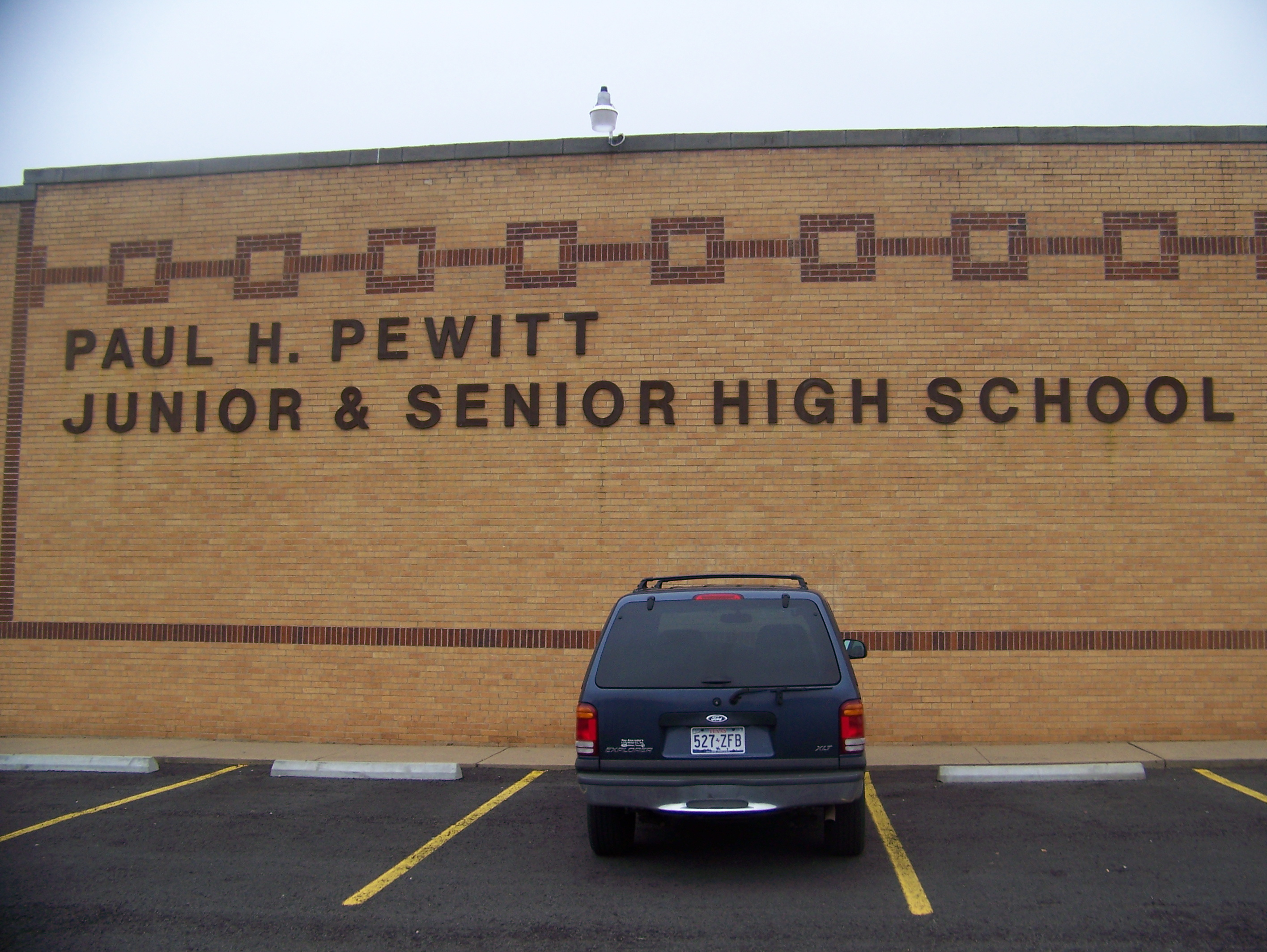

Location
- 1216 US HWY 67 West; Omaha, Texas 75571-4596; United States; 33.1854°N 94.7112°W

Information
- Type: Public high school
- School district: Pewitt Consolidated Independent School District
- NCES School ID: 483480003902
- Principal: Jeremy Adam’s and Tonya Briggs
- Teaching staff: 22.58 (on an FTE basis)
- Grades: 9–12
- Enrollment: 238 (2018-19)
- Student to teacher ratio: 10.54
- Colors: Blue and Gray
- Athletics conference: University Interscholastic League Class 3A
- Mascot: Brahma
- Yearbook: Round-Up
- Website: www.pewittcisd.net/97162_2

Paul Pewitt High School is a public high school in Omaha, Texas, United States. It is part of the Pewitt Consolidated Independent School District and classified as a 3A school by the University Interscholastic League. In 2015, the school was rated "Met Standard" by the Texas Education Agency.

== Athletics ==
The Paul Pewitt Brahmas compete in volleyball, cross country, football, basketball, golf, tennis, track, baseball, and softball.

=== State titles ===
- Football
  - 1998(2A/D1)

4 x 400 Meter relay girls championship including Tracey Taylor, Michelle Johnson, Judy Hill, Iris Boyd

=== State finalist ===
- Football
  - 2019(3A/D2), 2005(2A/D1), 1993(2A/D1)

== Theater ==
- One Act Play
  - 2003(2A)
  - 1982 (3A)
