= Blackwell High School =

Blackwell High School may refer to one of several high schools in the United States:

- Blackwell High School (Oklahoma) — Part of the Blackwell Public Schools in Blackwell, Oklahoma
- Blackwell High School (Texas) — Part of the Blackwell Consolidated Independent School District in Blackwell, Texas
- Blackwell High School may also refer to Hatch End High School in London, UK, after it was renamed.

== See also ==
- Bartlett High School (Bartlett, Tennessee), formerly known as Nicholas Blackwell High School
