= Wellman-Union Consolidated Independent School District =

School district in Texas

Coordinates: 33.052°N 102.349°W

Wellman-Union Consolidated Independent School District is a public school district based in Wellman, Texas (USA).

Located in Terry County, the district extends into a small portion of Gaines County.

The district was created on July 1, 1997 by the consolidation of the Wellman and Union districts.

== Academic achievement ==
In 2009, the school district was rated "recognized" by the Texas Education Agency.

== Schools ==
- Wellman-Union Secondary School (grades 6-12)
- Wellman-Union Elementary School (grades K-5)

== Special programs ==
=== Athletics ===
Wellman-Union High School plays six-man football.

== See also ==
- List of school districts in Texas
