= Petty, Texas =

Unincorporated community in Texas, US

Coordinates: 33°36′12″N 95°48′20″W

Petty is an unincorporated community and census designated place (CDP) in Lamar County, Texas, United States.

As of the 2020 census, Petty had a population of 140.

The community bears the name of a pioneer citizen.

== Demographics ==
Historical population
Census	Pop.	Note	%±
2020	140		—
U.S. Decennial Census; 1850–1900 1910; 1920 1930 1940; 1950 1960 1970; 1980 1990 2000; 2010 2020

Petty first appeared as a census designated place in the 2020 U.S. census.

=== 2020 Census ===
Petty CDP, Texas – Racial and ethnic composition Note: the US Census treats Hispanic/Latino as an ethnic category. This table excludes Latinos from the racial categories and assigns them to a separate category. Hispanics/Latinos may be of any race.
Race / Ethnicity (NH = Non-Hispanic)	Pop 2020	% 2020
White alone (NH)	111	79.29%
Black or African American alone (NH)	0	0.00%
Native American or Alaska Native alone (NH)	0	0.00%
Asian alone (NH)	0	0.00%
Native Hawaiian or Pacific Islander alone (NH)	0	0.00%
Other race alone (NH)	0	0.00%
Mixed race or Multiracial (NH)	13	9.29%
Hispanic or Latino (any race)	16	11.43%
Total	140	100.00%

== Education ==
The Chisum Independent School District serves area students.

The Texas Education Code specifies that all of Lamar County is in the service area of Paris Junior College.
