= Wilson Independent School District =

Public school district

Coordinates: 33°19′12″N 101°43′45″W

Wilson Independent School District is a public school district based in Wilson, Texas, United States.

The district operates one school serving grades PK-12.

== Academic achievement ==
In 2009, the school district was rated "academically acceptable" by the Texas Education Agency.

== See also ==
- List of school districts in Texas
