= Toco, Texas =

- City
- Coordinates: 33°39′14″N 95°38′57″W
- Country: United States
- State: Texas
- County: Lamar

Area
  - Total: 0.17 sq mi (0.44 km^{2})
  - Land: 0.17 sq mi (0.44 km^{2})
  - Water: 0 sq mi (0.00 km^{2})
- Elevation: 568 ft (173 m)

Population (2020)
  - Total: 91
  - Density: 540/sq mi (210/km^{2})
- Time zone: UTC-6 (Central (CST))
  - Summer (DST): UTC-5 (CDT)
- FIPS code: 48-73196
- GNIS feature ID: 2412073

Toco is a city in Lamar County, Texas, United States. The population was 75 at the 2010 census, and 91 in 2020.

== Geography ==
Toco is located in west-central Lamar County. U.S. Route 82 forms the southern boundary of the community; it leads east 5 miles (8 km) to Paris, the county seat, and west 16 miles (26 km) to Honey Grove.

According to the United States Census Bureau, the city has a total area of 0.2 square miles (0.4 km^{2}), of which 0.8 acres (3,304 m^{2}), or 0.75%, are water. The city's land drains east to the South Branch of Pine Creek, a northeastward-flowing tributary of the Red River.

== Demographics ==
Historical population
Census	Pop.	Note	%±
1980	164		—
1990	127		−22.6%
2000	89		−29.9%
2010	75		−15.7%
2020	91		21.3%
U.S. Decennial Census

=== Racial and ethnic composition ===
Toco city, Texas – Racial and ethnic composition Note: the US Census treats Hispanic/Latino as an ethnic category. This table excludes Latinos from the racial categories and assigns them to a separate category. Hispanics/Latinos may be of any race.
Race / Ethnicity (NH = Non-Hispanic)	Pop 2000	Pop 2010	Pop 2020	% 2000	% 2010	% 2020
White alone (NH)	15	11	14	16.85%	14.67%	15.38%
Black or African American alone (NH)	68	54	56	76.40%	72.00%	61.54%
Native American or Alaska Native alone (NH)	2	0	2	2.25%	0.00%	2.20%
Asian alone (NH)	0	0	0	0.00%	0.00%	0.00%
Native Hawaiian or Pacific Islander alone (NH)	0	0	0	0.00%	0.00%	0.00%
Other race alone (NH)	0	0	0	0.00%	0.00%	0.00%
Mixed race or Multiracial (NH)	1	3	6	1.12%	4.00%	6.59%
Hispanic or Latino (any race)	3	7	13	3.37%	9.33%	14.29%
Total	89	75	91	100.00%	100.00%	100.00%

=== 2020 census ===
As of the 2020 United States census, there were 91 people, 40 households, and 28 families residing in the city. As of the census of 2000, there were 89 people, 34 households, and 26 families residing in the city. The population density was 523.7 inhabitants per square mile (202.2/km^{2}). There were 35 housing units at an average density of 205.9 per square mile (79.5/km^{2}). The racial makeup of the city was 17.98% White, 76.40% African American, 2.25% Native American, 2.25% from other races, and 1.12% from two or more races. Hispanic or Latino of any race were 3.37% of the population.

There were 34 households, out of which 23.5% had children under the age of 18 living with them, 50.0% were married couples living together, 20.6% had a female householder with no husband present, and 23.5% were non-families. 23.5% of all households were made up of individuals, and 11.8% had someone living alone who was 65 years of age or older. The average household size was 2.62 and the average family size was 3.00.

In the city, the population was spread out, with 28.1% under the age of 18, 6.7% from 18 to 24, 20.2% from 25 to 44, 29.2% from 45 to 64, and 15.7% who were 65 years of age or older. The median age was 43 years. For every 100 females, there were 81.6 males. For every 100 females age 18 and over, there were 77.8 males.

The median income for a household in the city was $16,250, and the median income for a family was $18,333. Males had a median income of $27,500 versus $26,250 for females. The per capita income for the city was $8,099. There were 50.0% of families and 56.0% of the population living below the poverty line, including 83.3% of under eighteens and 23.1% of those over 64.

== Education ==
The city is served by the Chisum Independent School District.

The Texas Education Code specifies that all of Lamar County is in the service area of Paris Junior College.

== Notable people ==
- Rocky Thompson, pro golfer and former mayor of Toco
