= Pewitt Consolidated Independent School District =

School district in Texas

Coordinates: 33.1831°N 94.7123°W

Address
- 1330 US Hwy 67 West Omaha, Texas, 75571-4598; United States

District information
- Type: Public school district
- Motto: Learning Today. Leading Tomorrow.
- Grades: PK-12
- President: Michael Jarvis
- Vice-president: Keith West
- Superintendent: Melissa Reid
- School board: Michael Jarvis (Board President) Keith West (Vice President) Tim Anderson (Secretary) Jennifer Reynolds Justin Green Seth Hodges Lora Vissering
- Schools: 3
- NCES District ID: 4834800

Students and staff
- Enrollment: 937 (2016-2017)
- Teachers: 76.79 (on an FTE basis)
- Student–teacher ratio: 12.20
- District mascot: Brahma (Buddy The Bull)
- Colors: Blue Grey and White

Other information
- Schedule: Monday-Thursday
- Website: www.pewittcisd.net

Pewitt Consolidated Independent School District is a public school district in Omaha, Texas, United States. The district's boundaries extend into three counties – northern Morris County (including the cities of Omaha and Naples), northwestern portion of Cass County (including the town of Marietta), and a small portion of east-central Titus County.

In 2009, the school district was rated "academically acceptable" by the Texas Education Agency.

== History ==
Pewitt CISD was founded in 1950 by Paul H. Pewitt after a tornado struck the Omaha and Naples schools. The district changed to a four-day school week in fall 2022.

== Schools ==
- Pewitt High School (grades 9-12)
- Pewitt Junior High School (grades 6-8)
- Pewitt Elementary School (prekindergarten-grade 5)

== History ==
Pewitt CISD is the result of a 1950 consolidation of two adjacent districts, the Omaha Independent School District in Omaha and the Naples Independent School District in neighboring Naples.

In late 1949 and early 1950, the two districts faced a financial issue in part because of a storm that all but destroyed the Omaha school. Both districts needed to upgrade their facilities, but the estimated cost of $90,000 was far greater than the districts (either separately or combined) could hope to raise.

In considering a proposal to consolidate the two districts, the school boards of both districts met in a joint meeting at the State Bank of Omaha at 7:00 pm on February 24, 1950. W. C. Stevens, president of the Omaha school board, presided over the meeting.

Paul H. Pewitt, a businessman from Longview, along with several of his associates, attended the meeting. Pewitt told the boards of his interest in the school children and made the following proposition: If the two districts would consolidate, he would purchase 100 acres (0.40 km^{2}) of land on the highway halfway between Omaha and Naples, grade and prepare the grounds for the buildings and general use of the school, and donate an additional $100,000.00 in cash to help with the construction of the necessary buildings and equipment.

The two boards then held separate meetings, and the board unanimously adopted a resolution accepting Pewitt’s proposition, and agreed to join the Omaha board in calling an election at the earliest possible date for the purpose of effecting the consolidation.

A joint committee, which was agreed to by the Omaha board, consisting of Bun Hall, R.E. Moore, Leon Coker, John Whitaker, and W.C. Stevens, was appointed to approve and arrange for the 100-acre (0.40 km^{2}) site and to serve as a general committee toward the consolidation.

This resolution was also adopted: "Be it Resolved that, the Board of Trustees, as far as it lies within our power, accept Mr. Pewitt’s very generous offer to donate the Omaha and Naples school districts, if consolidated, $100,000 in cash, 100 acres (0.40 km^{2}) of land for school purposes on the highway between the two towns, and other assistance, and that this board does hereby extend to Mr. Pewitt its heart-felt thanks for so generous an offer, and that as a token of our appreciation, and that of the people of our district, we recommend that the High School to be constructed on said grounds to be known as the ‘Paul H. Pewitt High School.’"

On April 3, 1950, the first board of trustees was elected: W.G. Granberry, J.M. Hampton, Jamie Brabham, B.B. Brown, Dr. C.J. Wise, R.E. Moore, and W.C. Stevens. Granberry was elected vice president and secretary; Stevens was elected president. On April 6, 1950, Frank C. Bean was hired as the first superintendent.

On September 1, 2008 the Marietta Independent School District closed and consolidated with Pewitt Independent School District to form Pewitt CISD.

== Notable alumni ==
- Jimmy Wilkerson

== See also ==
- List of school districts in Texas
