= Greg Davis (American football coach) =

American football player and coach (born 1951)

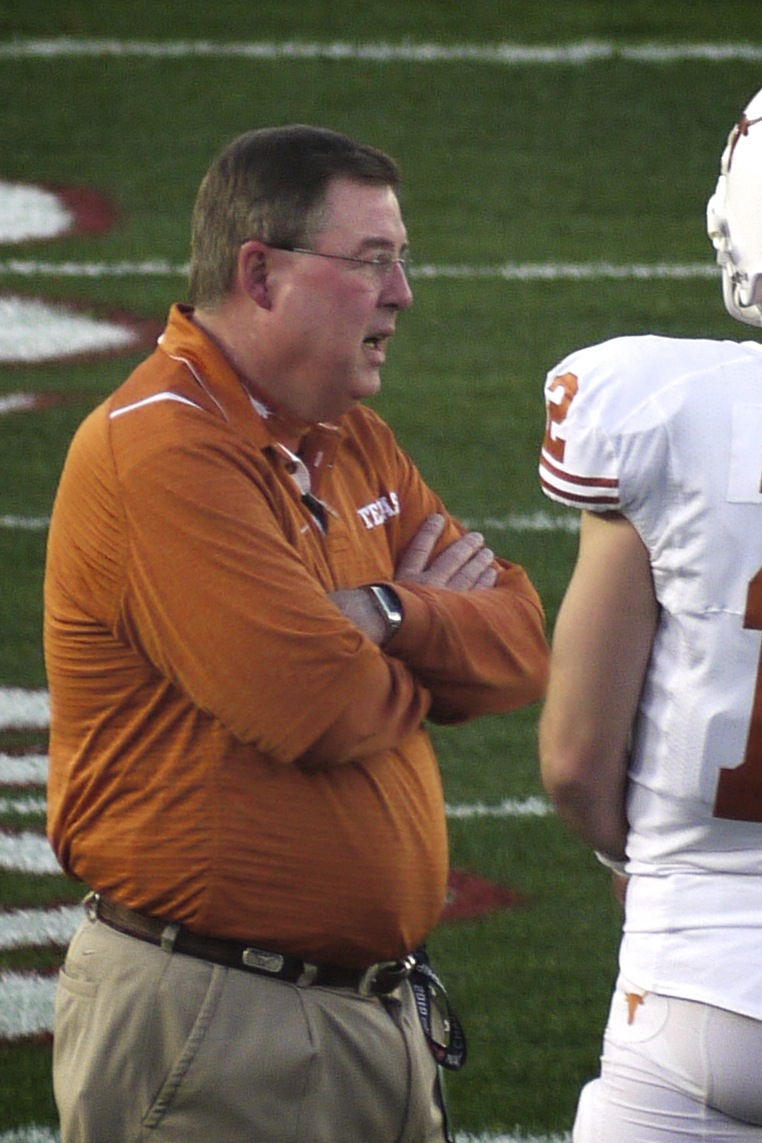

Biographical details
- Born: April 25, 1951 (age 75); Groves, Texas, U.S.

Playing career
- 1969–1972: McNeese State
- Position: Quarterback

Coaching career (HC unless noted)
- 1973–1974: Barbe HS (LA) (assistant)
- 1975–1977: PNG HS (TX) (assistant)
- 1978–1984: Texas A&M (QB)
- 1985–1987: Tulane (AHC/WR)
- 1988–1991: Tulane
- 1992–1993: Arkansas (OC/QB)
- 1994–1995: Georgia (QB)
- 1996–1997: North Carolina (OC/QB)
- 1998–2010: Texas (OC/QB)
- 2012–2016: Iowa (OC/QB)

Head coaching record
- Overall: 14–31

Accomplishments and honors

Awards
- Broyles Award (2005)

Greg Davis (born April 25, 1951) is an American former college football coach. He served as offensive coordinator and quarterbacks coach for the University of Iowa Hawkeyes football team until announcing his retirement on January 6, 2017. He served as offensive coordinator for the 2005 national champion Texas Longhorns, where he was awarded the Broyles Award for the nation's top assistant coach for the 2005 season.

== Playing career ==
Davis attended Port Neches–Groves High School and then played quarterback at McNeese State University, where he first met R. C. Slocum. He played in the Grantland Rice Bowl in 1971, losing to Tennessee State 26–23. He graduated from McNeese State in 1973.

== Coaching career ==
Davis started his coaching career as a quarterbacks/receivers coach at Barbe High School in Lake Charles, Louisiana. He served two seasons there, and then went on to become the quarterbacks coach for two seasons at Port Neches-Groves High School, his high school alma mater. He began his college coaching career as the quarterbacks coach under Tom Wilson and Jackie Sherrill at Texas A&M University. He was a part-time assistant at A&M in 1978, and then was named a full-time coach in 1979. He worked alongside Slocum, who then served as the defensive coordinator.

Davis later became an assistant under Mack Brown at Tulane University, and succeeded Brown as Tulane head coach in 1988. Following stints at the University of Georgia and the University of Arkansas, Davis rejoined Brown's coaching staff at North Carolina, before following him to Texas in 1998.

For the 2008 season, Davis's salary was raised to $425,000, making him the second highest-paid offensive coordinator in the nation, behind Florida State's Jimbo Fisher.

However, on December 6, 2010, after the worst season in the Mack Brown era at the University of Texas, Greg Davis resigned as offensive coordinator of the Longhorns. The 2010 season was the first season in 13 years the Longhorns failed to make a bowl game, and the first in nine seasons the Longhorns failed to reach 10 wins on the season.

After a year out of football, Davis was hired by the University of Iowa for the 2012 season. Greg Davis replaced Ken O'Keefe as the offensive coordinator for the Iowa Hawkeyes in 2012.

== Head coaching record ==
Year	Team	Overall	Conference	Standing	Bowl/playoffs
Tulane Green Wave (NCAA Division I-A independent) (1988–1991)
1988	Tulane	5–6			
1989	Tulane	4–8			
1990	Tulane	4–7			
1991	Tulane	1–10			
Tulane:		14–31			
Total:		14–31			

== Sources ==
- Lane, Oliver (1982). The 1982 Maroon Book: Texas Aggie Football. Dallas, Texas: Taylor Publishing Company. ISBN 0-87833-328-2.
