= Blackwell, Texas =

- City
- Interactive map of Blackwell, Texas
- Coordinates: 32°05′06″N 100°19′10″W
- Country: United States
- State: Texas
- Counties: Nolan, Coke

Area
  - Total: 0.59 sq mi (1.53 km^{2})
  - Land: 0.59 sq mi (1.53 km^{2})
  - Water: 0 sq mi (0.00 km^{2})
- Elevation: 2,106 ft (642 m)

Population (2020)
  - Total: 258
  - Density: 437/sq mi (169/km^{2})
- Time zone: UTC-6 (Central (CST))
  - Summer (DST): UTC-5 (CDT)
- ZIP code: 79506
- Area code: 915
- FIPS code: 48-08488
- GNIS feature ID: 2409859

Blackwell is a city in Coke and Nolan Counties in the U.S. state of Texas. Its population was 258 at the 2020 census.

== Geography ==
According to the United States Census Bureau, the city has a total area of 0.59 square miles (1.53 km^{2}), all land.

== Demographics ==
Historical population
Census	Pop.	Note	%±
1960	314		—
1970	279		−11.1%
1980	286		2.5%
1990	339		18.5%
2000	360		6.2%
2010	311		−13.6%
2020	258		−17.0%
U.S. Decennial Census

=== 2020 census ===
As of the 2020 census, 258 people, 92 households, and 55 families resided in the city. The median age was 50.8 years, 19.8% of residents were under the age of 18, and 25.2% were 65 years of age or older. For every 100 females there were 101.6 males, and for every 100 females age 18 and over there were 111.2 males age 18 and over.

There were 121 households in Blackwell, of which 28.9% had children under the age of 18 living in them. Of all households, 45.5% were married-couple households, 20.7% were households with a male householder and no spouse or partner present, and 24.8% were households with a female householder and no spouse or partner present. About 25.6% of all households were made up of individuals and 13.2% had someone living alone who was 65 years of age or older.

There were 144 housing units, of which 16.0% were vacant. Among occupied housing units, 76.0% were owner-occupied and 24.0% were renter-occupied. The homeowner vacancy rate was <0.1% and the rental vacancy rate was 14.7%.

0% of residents lived in urban areas, while 100.0% lived in rural areas.

Racial composition as of the 2020 census
Race	Percent
White	88.0%
Black or African American	0.4%
American Indian and Alaska Native	1.2%
Asian	0%
Native Hawaiian and Other Pacific Islander	0.4%
Some other race	2.3%
Two or more races	7.8%
Hispanic or Latino (of any race)	9.3%

=== 2000 census ===
As of the census of 2000, 360 people, 153 households, and 106 families resided in the city. The population density was 602.4 inhabitants per square mile (232.6/km^{2}). The 180 housing units averaged 301.2 units per square mile (116.3 units/km^{2}). The racial makeup of the city was 90.56% White, 0.28% African American, 0.28% Native American, 7.78% from other races, and 1.11% from two or more races. Hispanics or Latinos of any race were 11.11% of the population.

Of 153 households, 32.7% had children under 18 living with them, 53.6% were married couples living together, 11.8% had a female householder with no husband present, and 30.1% were not families. About 28.1% of all households were made up of individuals, and 14.4% had someone living alone who was 65 or older. The average household size was 2.35, and the average family size was 2.83.

In the city, the population was distributed as 26.9% under 18, 6.4% from 18 to 24, 25.3% from 25 to 44, 18.6% from 45 to 64, and 22.8% who were 65 or older. The median age was 40 years. For every 100 females, there were 91.5 males. For every 100 females 18 and over, there were 89.2 males.

The median income for a household in the city was $29,659, and for a family was $33,250. Males had a median income of $30,000 versus $19,861 for females. The per capita income for the city was $14,686. About 6.7% of families and 11.2% of the population were below the poverty line, including 20.4% of those under age 18 and none of those age 65 or over.

== Education ==
Blackwell is served by the Blackwell Consolidated Independent School District.

Nolan County is in the service area of Western Texas College District. Coke County is in the service area of Howard County Junior College District.
