= Northeast Texas Trail =

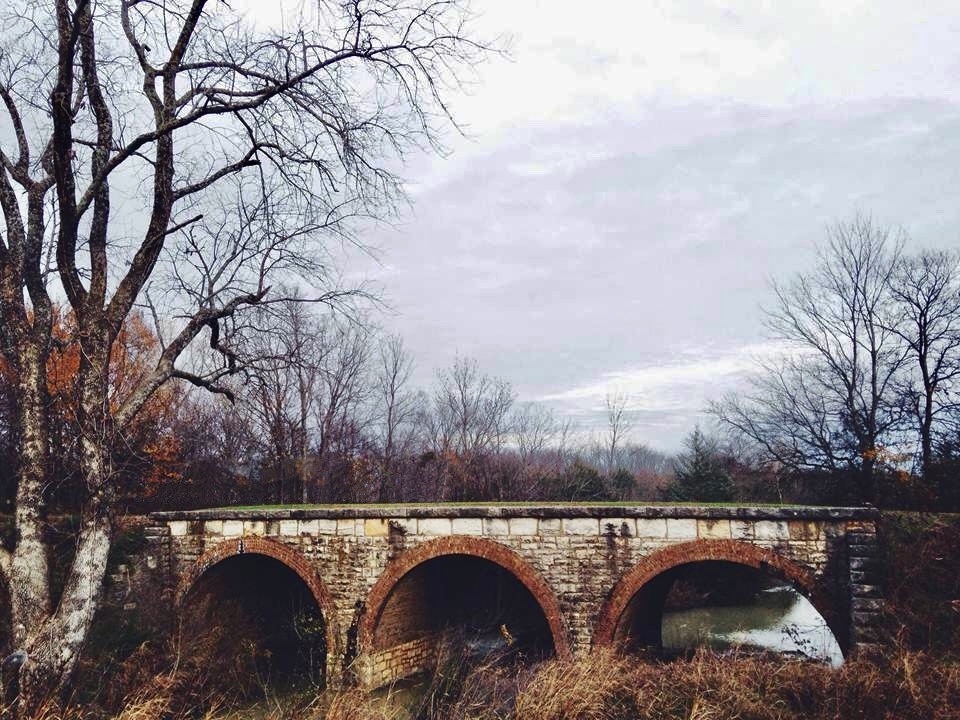
- Bridge along NETT near Roxton, Texas
- Length: 130 mi (210 km)
- Location: Northeast Texas, United States
- Established: 2011
- Trailheads: Eastern: New Boston, Texas; Western: Farmersville
- Use: Bicycling, hiking
- Difficulty: Moderate
- Hazards: Severe weather, Poison ivy
- Website: northeasttexastrail.org

The Northeast Texas Trail (NETT) is a 130+-mile multi-use trail along the route, following alongside U.S. Highway 82 and Texas State Highway 34. The trail connects nineteen cities spread over seven counties, stretching from the edge of the Dallas–Fort Worth metroplex to the Texarkana metropolitan area along the Arkansas border. The Northeast Texas Trail is the longest hike/bike and equestrian trail in Texas and the fourth longest in the United States. As of 2026, the trail exists in a patchwork of completed, paved sections and highly rugged, unimproved stretches.

The trail is designed to provide access for hikers, mountain bicyclists, and in some sections, equestrians. It is accessible by trailheads running through cities along the trail, while the trail will extend into more remote areas between the cities. The first trail section, the 2.36 multi-use portion "Trail de Paris" was dedicated in 2004.

Scattered along the trail are several creeks and over one hundred rail bridges, including a crossing of the Sulphur River and many branches of Kickapoo Creek.

== History ==
In the late 1990s, two railroads—the Union Pacific Railroad and the Chaparral Railroad decided to cease active service and publicized their railroad corridors availability for rail banking through the Surface Transportation Board of the United States Department of Transportation. Three private organizations Rails-to-Trails Conservancy (RTC) 1997, Greater Paris Development Foundation (GPDF) 1996, and Chaparral Rails to Trails Inc. (CRT) 1995.

=== Farmersville to Paris, Texas ===
The Famersville to Paris, Texas, right-of-way was constructed in 1886 by the Gulf, Colorado and Santa Fe Railway to connect the railroad with a northern connection: the St. Louis-San Francisco Railway in Paris, TX. GC&SF became a Texas-based subsidiary of the Atchison, Topeka and Santa Fe Railroad in the same year, 1886. In 1990, the Kiamichi Railroad, a regional company with a presence in nearby states of Arkansas and Oklahoma, desired access into Dallas from their mainline in Purcell, OK. This segment of railway would provide the connection, and thus, they purchased this line from the AT&SF and created a subsidiary company, the Chaparral Railroad, to operate it. The railroad was not profitable and the line was railbanked* in 1995 and "transferred" to the Chaparral Rails to Trails, Inc. Today, the right-of-way serves as the 62-mile Chaparral Rails to Trails section of the Northeast Texas Trail, (NETT), connecting Farmersville with Paris, TX. The Audie Murphy Trailhead Park and Santa Fe Farmersville Onion Shed are located at the western terminus of the trail in Farmersville, TX.

=== Paris to New Boston, Texas ===
The Paris to New Boston, Texas, line was constructed in 1876 by the Texas & Pacific Railway Company. It was a part of Jay Gould's Transcontinental Branch of the T&P Railway, connecting Texarkana, Texas, with Sherman, Texas. The line reached Paris, TX in 1876. MP took control of the T&P in, 1976. UP took control of the MP in 1997. Union Pacific decided to cease active service of the line in the late 1990s. The right-of-way was railbanked and transferred to the Rails-to-Trails Conservancy in 1997. (Rather than abandoning railroad routes and losing the right-of-way easements, railroads agree to a legal process called railbanking, which allows for the use of the right-of-way as trails, until and if they are needed for rail service in the future.)

Today, the right-of-way serves as the Northeast Texas Trail, (NETT), connecting the 68 miles between Paris, Texas, and New Boston, Texas, at the T&P Trailhead Park.

This adaptive re-use of unused railroad tracks unifies many northeast Texas counties and cities and provides a major recreational amenity for the more than 47,500 people who live and work within a mile of the Trail. The new, partly completed trail attracts pedestrians and nature-lovers, both Texas residents and visitors.

== Trail by county ==
The section of the trail that runs through Collin, Hunt and Fannin counties, from the western trailhead, Farmersville to Pecan Gap is open, as is a large section from Lamar County to Red River County (Paris to Clarksville) has been cleared, and currently parts of the NETT trail are being rerouted to pass around uncleared portions of the trail. Large sections of the trail through Collin, Fannin, Hunt, Lamar and Red River counties have been cleared. Much of the remaining mileage requires additional work clearing the trail over overgrowth.

Collin County

- Farmersville (Western Trailhead) to Merit - 5 miles - Open

Hunt County

- Merit to Celeste - 7.7 miles - Open
- Celeste to Wolfe City - 8.7 miles - Open - unimproved, unimproved bridges.

Fannin County

- Wolfe City to Ladonia - 8.6 miles - Open - unimproved, unimproved bridges.
- Ladonia to Pecan Gap - 5.8 miles - Open - unimproved, unimproved bridges.
- Pecan Gap to Ben Franklin - 5.4 miles - Closed, bypass on FM 128

Lamar County

- Ben Franklin to Roxton - 5.6 miles - Closed, due to collapsed bridge, bypass on FM 38. Rt. on CR25300 to return to open Trail
- Roxton to Paris - 14.4 miles - Open - Detour to Paris to CR 22500 (Rt) then Lt on FM 137, Right on Washington, Rt on 4th to open Trail
- Paris to Reno - 5.9 miles - Open
- Reno to Blossom - 1.8 miles - Open
- Blossom to Detroit - 6.6 miles - Open

Red River County

- Detroit to Bagwell - 6.2 miles - Open
- Bagwell to Clarksville - 7.0 miles - Open
- Clarksville to Annona - 8.2 miles - Closed, bypass on US 82
- Annona to Avery - 8.4 miles - Closed, bypass on US 82, FM 4305

Bowie County

- Avery to DeKalb - 10.3 miles - Open
- DeKalb to Malta to New Boston (Eastern Trailhead) - Closed, bypass on US 82

== Northeast Texas Trail Coalition ==
The Northeast Texas Trail Coalition is the 501(c)(3) nonprofit organization working on the Northeast Texas Trail. It partners with governments, nonprofit land trusts, and volunteer organizations in all seven Northeast Texas counties to help protect and preserve, plan, construct, and promote the Northeast Texas Trail. The coalition aims to complete clearing and grading of the entire 130 miles of the NETT in 2027, and surfacing of the entire 130 miles in 2029, including bridge refurbishment or replacement.

Five of the seven expansions have been the result of the NorthEast Texas Trail Coalition partnering with Lamar County, City of Reno, City of Blossom, and 3 times with the City of Paris to write the application and be awarded Texas Parks and Wildlife's (TPWD) Texas Recreational Trails Fund grants. The Cities of Farmersville, Wolfe City, Roxton, Clarksville, Annona, Avery, and New Boston have also been successful in obtaining a TPWD grants to construct trails on their sections of the NETT corridor.

The Coaliltion meets monthly and quarterly rotating between cities along and supporting the trail, and with online meetings.
