= Lake Creek, Texas =

- Unincorporated community
- Location within Texas Location within the United States
- Coordinates: 33°26′50″N 95°35′17″W
- Country: United States
- State: Texas
- County: Delta
- Elevation: 443 ft (135 m)
- Time zone: UTC-6 (Central (CST))
  - Summer (DST): UTC-5 (CDT)
- Postal code: 75450
- Area codes: 903 & 430
- GNIS feature ID: 1360838

Lake Creek (originally, Odd's Creek) is an unincorporated community in Delta County, Texas, United States. According to the Handbook of Texas, its population was estimated at 60 in 2000.

== Geography ==
Lake Creek is located at the intersection of Farm to Market Roads 198 and 1335 on a creek of the same name, 6 mi (9.7 km) northeast of Cooper in north-central Delta County.

== Education ==
Evergreen Academy, the local school, had 112 students and three teachers as of 1905. The school ended operations sometime in the early 20th century, and by the 1970s the community's children were educated by the Cooper Independent School District. Today, the Chisum Independent School District serves area students. It was also part of the now defunct Delmar Independent School District.
