= Wellman, Texas =

- City
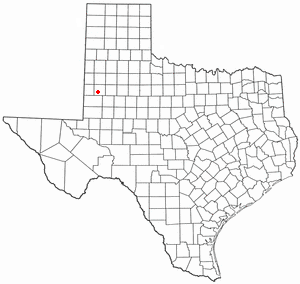
- Location of Wellman, Texas

- Coordinates: 33°2′50″N 102°25′41″W
- Country: United States
- State: Texas
- County: Terry

Area
  - Total: 0.34 sq mi (0.88 km^{2})
  - Land: 0.34 sq mi (0.88 km^{2})
  - Water: 0 sq mi (0.00 km^{2})
- Elevation: 3,350 ft (1,021 m)

Population (2020)
  - Total: 230
  - Density: 680/sq mi (260/km^{2})
- Time zone: UTC-6 (Central (CST))
  - Summer (DST): UTC-5 (CDT)
- ZIP code: 79378
- Area code: 806
- FIPS code: 48-77164
- GNIS feature ID: 1349638

Wellman is a city in Terry County, Texas, United States. The city was formed in 1918 as a shipping point on the Santa Fe Railroad and named after Augustus Ogden Wellman, who had been an assistant to the railroad's secretary and treasurer. Its population was 230 at the 2020 census.

== Geography ==
Wellman is located at 33°2′50″N 102°25′41″W (33.047108, –102.428023).

According to the United States Census Bureau, the city has a total area of 0.3 square mile (0.9 km^{2}), all land.

== Demographics ==
Historical population
Census	Pop.	Note	%±
1980	239		—
1990	239		0.0%
2000	203		−15.1%
2010	203		0.0%
2020	230		13.3%
U.S. Decennial Census; 2020 Census

=== 2020 census ===
As of the 2020 census, Wellman had a population of 230 and a median age of 31.3 years.

36.1% of residents were under the age of 18 and 11.7% were 65 years of age or older. For every 100 females there were 75.6 males, and for every 100 females age 18 and over there were 79.3 males age 18 and over.

There were 79 households in Wellman, of which 58.2% had children under the age of 18 living in them. Of all households, 63.3% were married-couple households, 8.9% were households with a male householder and no spouse or partner present, and 22.8% were households with a female householder and no spouse or partner present. About 12.7% of all households were made up of individuals and 7.6% had someone living alone who was 65 years of age or older.

There were 87 housing units, of which 9.2% were vacant. The homeowner vacancy rate was 0.0% and the rental vacancy rate was 0.0%.

0.0% of residents lived in urban areas, while 100.0% lived in rural areas.

Racial composition as of the 2020 census
Race	Number	Percent
White	178	77.4%
Black or African American	0	0.0%
American Indian and Alaska Native	1	0.4%
Asian	0	0.0%
Native Hawaiian and Other Pacific Islander	0	0.0%
Some other race	10	4.3%
Two or more races	41	17.8%
Hispanic or Latino (of any race)	84	36.5%

=== 2000 census ===
As of the 2000 census, 203 people, 74 households, and 56 families were residing in the city. The population density was 589.3 inhabitants per square mile (227.5/km^{2}). The 94 housing units had an average density of 272.9 per square mile (105.4/km^{2}). The racial makeup of the city was 83.74% White, 2.46% Native American, 11.82% from other races, and 1.97% from two or more races. Hispanics or Latinos of any race were 29.06% of the population.

Of the 74 households, 40.5% had children under the age of 18 living with them, 67.6% were married couples living together, 6.8% had a female householder with no husband present, and 24.3% were not families. About 24.3% of all households were made up of individuals, and 10.8% had someone living alone who was 65 years of age or older. The average household size was 2.74, and the average family size was 3.30.

In the city, the age distribution was 31.5% under 18, 6.4% from 18 to 24, 19.7% from 25 to 44, 28.1% from 45 to 64, and 14.3% who were 65 or older. The median age was 38 years. For every 100 females, there were 88.0 males. For every 100 females age 18 and over, there were 98.6 males.

The median income for a household in the city was $50,833, and for a family was $55,357. Males had a median income of $28,750 versus $32,188 for females. The per capita income for the city was $15,757. About 18.8% of families and 22.0% of the population were below the poverty line, including 34.9% of those under the age of 18 and 13.3% of those 65 or over.

== Education ==
Wellman is served by the Wellman-Union Consolidated Independent School District. The former Wellman Independent School District merged into Wellman-Union CISD on July 1, 1997.
