= Roxton, Texas =

- City
- Coordinates: 33°32′43″N 95°43′29″W
- Country: United States
- State: Texas
- County: Lamar

Area
  - Total: 0.87 sq mi (2.26 km^{2})
  - Land: 0.86 sq mi (2.24 km^{2})
  - Water: 0.0077 sq mi (0.02 km^{2})
- Elevation: 509 ft (155 m)

Population (2020)
  - Total: 548
  - Density: 740.4/sq mi (285.86/km^{2})
- Time zone: UTC-6 (Central (CST))
  - Summer (DST): UTC-5 (CDT)
- ZIP code: 75477
- Area codes: 903, 430
- FIPS code: 48-63584
- GNIS feature ID: 2411008
- Website: cityofroxton.com

Roxton is a city in Lamar County, Texas, United States. As of the 2010 census, the city population was 650, a figure which declined to 548 as of 2020.

== Geography ==
According to the United States Census Bureau, the city has a total area of 0.9 square miles (2.3 km^{2}), of which 0.9 square miles (2.3 km^{2}) is land and 1.14% is water.

== Demographics ==
Historical population
| Census | Pop. | Note | %± |
|---|---|---|---|
| 1890 | 226 | | — |
| 1980 | 735 | | — |
| 1990 | 639 | | −13.1% |
| 2000 | 694 | | 8.6% |
| 2010 | 650 | | −6.3% |
| 2020 | 548 | | −15.7% |
U.S. Decennial Census

=== 2020 census ===
As of the 2020 census, Roxton had a population of 548. The median age was 40.3 years. 24.6% of residents were under the age of 18 and 22.6% of residents were 65 years of age or older. For every 100 females there were 98.6 males, and for every 100 females age 18 and over there were 93.0 males age 18 and over.

0.0% of residents lived in urban areas, while 100.0% lived in rural areas.

There were 243 households in Roxton, of which 31.7% had children under the age of 18 living in them. Of all households, 32.1% were married-couple households, 25.5% were households with a male householder and no spouse or partner present, and 35.8% were households with a female householder and no spouse or partner present. About 34.6% of all households were made up of individuals and 18.1% had someone living alone who was 65 years of age or older.

There were 275 housing units, of which 11.6% were vacant. The homeowner vacancy rate was 1.3% and the rental vacancy rate was 7.1%.

Racial composition as of the 2020 census
| Race | Number | Percent |
|---|---|---|
| White | 404 | 73.7% |
| Black or African American | 81 | 14.8% |
| American Indian and Alaska Native | 10 | 1.8% |
| Asian | 1 | 0.2% |
| Native Hawaiian and Other Pacific Islander | 0 | 0.0% |
| Some other race | 4 | 0.7% |
| Two or more races | 48 | 8.8% |
| Hispanic or Latino (of any race) | 38 | 6.9% |

=== 2000 census ===
As of the 2000 census, there were 694 people, 280 households, and 190 families residing in the city. The population density was 797.3 inhabitants per square mile (307.8/km^{2}). There were 326 housing units at an average density of 374.5 per square mile (144.6/km^{2}). The racial makeup of the city was 74.78% White, 21.33% African American, 1.73% Native American, 1.15% from other races, and 1.01% from two or more races. Hispanic or Latino of any race were 2.59% of the population.

There were 280 households, out of which 30.7% had children under the age of 18 living with them, 48.2% were married couples living together, 16.8% had a female householder with no husband present, and 31.8% were non-families. 29.6% of all households were made up of individuals, and 18.2% had someone living alone who was 65 years of age or older. The average household size was 2.48 and the average family size was 3.08.

In the city, the population was spread out, with 29.5% under the age of 18, 7.8% from 18 to 24, 23.6% from 25 to 44, 19.7% from 45 to 64, and 19.3% who were 65 years of age or older. The median age was 37 years. For every 100 females, there were 82.6 males. For every 100 females age 18 and over, there were 77.2 males.

The median income for a household in the city was $25,000, and the median income for a family was $31,250. Males had a median income of $23,750 versus $21,016 for females. The per capita income for the city was $12,444. About 20.6% of families and 25.5% of the population were below the poverty line, including 36.5% of those under age 18 and 21.4% of those age 65 or over.

== Education ==
The city of Roxton is served by the Chisum Independent School District. Until 2019, the Roxton Independent School District served Roxton. However, Roxton ISD closed after the 2018–19 school year, due to financial hardships, and consolidated into Chisum ISD.

The Texas Education Code specifies that all of Lamar County is in the service area of Paris Junior College.

== Infrastructure ==
=== Transportation ===
==== Highways ====
- Farm to Market 38
- Farm to Market 137
- Farm to Market 2122

==== Trails ====
Roxton is located on the Northeast Texas Trail (NETT), a 130 mi (210 km) hike-and-bike trail from Farmersville, Texas, to New Boston, Texas, which follows a disused railroad right-of-way railbanked by the Union Pacific Railroad and Chaparral Railroad in the 1990s.
