= Groves, Texas =

- City
- Location of Groves, Texas
- Coordinates: 29°56′44″N 93°54′59″W
- Country: United States
- State: Texas
- County: Jefferson

Government
  - Type: Council-Manager

Area
  - Total: 5.19 sq mi (13.44 km^{2})
  - Land: 5.17 sq mi (13.40 km^{2})
  - Water: 0.015 sq mi (0.04 km^{2})
- Elevation: 10 ft (3.0 m)

Population (2020)
  - Total: 17,335
  - Density: 2,992.2/sq mi (1,155.29/km^{2})
- Time zone: UTC-6 (Central (CST))
  - Summer (DST): UTC-5 (CDT)
- ZIP code: 77619
- Area code: 409
- FIPS code: 48-31328
- GNIS feature ID: 2410669
- Website: grovestx.gov

Groves is a city in Jefferson County, Texas, United States. The population was 17,335 at the 2020 census. It is part of the Beaumont–Port Arthur Metropolitan Statistical Area.

== History ==
In 1886, Sam Courville moved his family from a Sabine Lake settlement in Port Arthur to a new home on 640 acres (2.6 km^{2}) of land. In that general area around 1911, John Warne Gates purchased additional tracts of land. The land was conveyed to the Griffing brothers of Port Arthur in 1916, and three years later Griffing Brothers Nursery employee Wiley Choate supervised the planting of several thousand pecan trees on a 385-acre (1.56 km^{2}) tract. In 1921, the Port Arthur Land Development Company took control of the site and divided the land into a residential subdivision known as "Pecan Grove". The name was later changed to "Groves", after development representative and pioneer Port Arthurian Asa Groves.

A post office was established in 1927, a school opened in 1929, and a public library opened in 1930. The community rapidly developed as a stop on the Kansas City Southern Railway. The Atlantic Refinery began operating in 1936. In 1940, a public water system was installed in the community. Several civic organizations, including the Lions Club, Chamber of Commerce, and Volunteer Fire Department, were formed during the 1940s. By the early 1950s, Groves had an estimated population of 1,300. In 1952, Groves voted to incorporate as a city. Rapid population growth followed, surpassing 17,000 in the 1960 census and reaching 18,067 by 1970. During the rest of the 20th century, the population slowly declined. In 2000, Groves was the fourth-largest city in Jefferson County, after Beaumont, Port Arthur, and Nederland.

== Geography ==
Groves is in eastern Jefferson County, 16 miles (26 km) southeast of downtown Beaumont. The city of Port Arthur borders Groves on three sides (southeast, southwest, and northeast), while Port Neches lies to the northwest. Three State Highways—73, 87, and 347—pass through or near the city. Sabine Lake, an estuary of the Gulf of Mexico, is 3 miles (5 km) to the southeast.

According to the United States Census Bureau, Groves has an area of 5.2 square miles (13.4 km^{2}), of which 0.015 square miles (0.04 km^{2}), or 0.28%, is water. Most of the city sits at an elevation of 5 to 15 feet (1.5 to 4.6 m) above sea level.

== Demographics ==
Historical population
Census	Pop.	Note	%±
1960	17,304		—
1970	18,067		4.4%
1980	17,090		−5.4%
1990	16,744		−2.0%
2000	15,733		−6.0%
2010	16,144		2.6%
2020	17,335		7.4%
U.S. Decennial Census

=== 2020 census ===
As of the 2020 census, Groves had a population of 17,335, a median age of 37.0 years, 25.4% of residents under the age of 18, and 15.8% of residents 65 years of age or older. For every 100 females there were 97.6 males, and for every 100 females age 18 and over there were 96.6 males.

100.0% of residents lived in urban areas, while 0.0% lived in rural areas.

There were 6,521 households in Groves, of which 35.4% had children under the age of 18 living in them. Of all households, 48.9% were married-couple households, 19.7% were households with a male householder and no spouse or partner present, and 24.9% were households with a female householder and no spouse or partner present. About 25.3% of all households were made up of individuals and 11.9% had someone living alone who was 65 years of age or older.

There were 7,078 housing units, of which 7.9% were vacant. The homeowner vacancy rate was 1.5% and the rental vacancy rate was 10.8%.

Racial composition as of the 2020 census
Race	Number	Percent
White	11,126	64.2%
Black or African American	1,098	6.3%
American Indian and Alaska Native	95	0.5%
Asian	597	3.4%
Native Hawaiian and Other Pacific Islander	5	0.0%
Some other race	2,015	11.6%
Two or more races	2,399	13.8%
Hispanic or Latino (of any race)	5,149	29.7%

=== 2000 census ===
As of the census of 2000, there were 15,733 people, 6,182 households, and 4,512 families residing in the city. The population density was 3,036.7 inhabitants per square mile (1,172.5/km^{2}). There were 6,570 housing units at an average density of 1,268.1 per square mile (489.6/km^{2}). The racial makeup of the city was 93.46% White, 1.32% African American, 0.26% Native American, 1.65% Asian, 0.03% Pacific Islander, 1.98% from other races, and 1.29% from two or more races. Hispanic or Latino of any race were 7.82% of the population.

There were 6,182 households, of which 31.6% had children under the age of 18 living with them, 59.8% were married couples living together, 9.9% had a female householder with no husband present, and 27.0% were non-families. 24.1% of all households were made up of individuals, and 12.4% had someone living alone who was 65 years of age or older. The average household size was 2.52 and the average family size was 2.98.

In the city, the population was spread out, with 23.9% under the age of 18 (see Recreation), 8.5% from 18 to 24, 26.8% from 25 to 44, 21.6% from 45 to 64, and 19.1% who were 65 years of age or older. The median age was 39 years. For every 100 females, there were 92.5 males. For every 100 females age 18 and over, there were 88.8 males.

The median income for a household in the city was $42,692, and the median income for a family was $50,892. Males had a median income of $41,404 versus $23,493 for females. The per capita income for the city was $21,147.

== Government and infrastructure ==
The United States Postal Service Groves Post Office is at 6230 39th Street.

The city has spent over $14 million on infrastructure since 2003. This includes a $6 million water treatment plant and $5 million borrowed from the TWDB to deal with inflow and infiltration issues in the waste water collection system. Substantial amounts have also been spent on the water distribution system and waste water treatment plant, and $2 million allocated to streets and drainage maintenance and improvements.

== Education ==
=== Primary and secondary schools ===
The city is primarily served by the Port Neches-Groves Independent School District. A small area of Groves is served by the Port Arthur Independent School District.

Groves Middle, Van Buren, Taft Elementary, and Groves Elementary are in Groves.

=== Colleges and universities ===
The Lamar University system is in nearby Beaumont. Post-secondary educational opportunities are provided to Groves and surrounding areas by the main campus of Lamar University, Lamar Institute of Technology, Lamar State College–Port Arthur, and Lamar State College–Orange.

=== Public libraries ===
The Groves Public Library is at 5600 West Washington Boulevard.

== In popular culture ==
A donut shop in Groves was a key location in the 2021 film Red Rocket.

== Notable people ==
- Greg Davis, college football coach
- Janis Joplin, singer
- Mary Karr, writer
- Brittney Rodriguez, actress

Jerry LaCroix, singer with Edgar Winter's White Tras, Blood Sweat and Tears, Rare Earth
