= Port Neches–Groves Independent School District =

School district in Texas, United States

Address
- 776 Magnolia Port Neches, Texas, 77651; United States

District information
- Type: Public
- Grades: PK–12
- Schools: 9
- NCES District ID: 4835430

Students and staff
- Students: 5,364 (2023–2024)
- Teachers: 380.72 (on an FTE basis) (2023–2024)
- Staff: 158.16 (on an FTE basis) (2023–2024)
- Student–teacher ratio: 14.09 (2023–2024)

Other information
- Website: www.pngisd.org

Port Neches–Groves Independent School District is a public school district based in Port Neches, Texas (USA). In addition to most of Port Neches, the district also serves most of the city of Groves, as well as portions of the neighboring city of Port Arthur.

It was originally named the Port Neches Independent School District but was later renamed.

In 2009, the school district was rated "recognized" by the Texas Education Agency.

== Schools ==
High school (Grades 9–12)
Port Neches-Groves High School (Port Neches)
Middle schools (Grades 6–8)

- Groves Middle School (Groves)
- Port Neches Middle School (Port Neches)

Elementary schools

- Grades 4-5
  - Groves Elementary School (Groves)
  - Port Neches Elementary School (Port Neches)
- Grades K-3
  - Taft Elementary School (Port Arthur)
  - Van Buren Elementary School (Groves)
  - Ridgewood Elementary School (Port Neches)
  - Woodcrest Elementary School (Port Neches)

Pre-Kindergarten

- West Groves Education Center (Groves)

Alternative education centers

- Grades 6-12: Alternative Education Center (Port Neches)

== Controversy ==
The Port Neches–Groves Independent School District has a long history involving its continued use of their mascot, the Indians, despite years of controversy and calls of racism. Their drill team performs wearing decorative war bonnets, their chants include the words "Scalp 'Em, Indians", their yearbook is the "War Whoop", their newspaper is called "The Pow Wow news" and their stadium is called, "The Reservation."

In 2020, the Cherokee Nation requested that the school stop using their mascot, rescinding an outdated approval given to the school from 1980. Despite a nearly 150,000 signature petition requesting the name change, along with the request of the Cherokee Nation, the town voted to keep the mascot.

In 2022, the Indianettes were filmed performing at Walt Disney World. According to Disney, when the school sent their audition video for approval, the Indianettes were not included and the school was instructed that their members could not wear their war bonnets during the performance. Their inclusion was not approved by Disney and was a decision made by the school. During the performance at the park, the team shouted chants of "Scalp 'Em" and enacted simulated war dances. The school has not issued a statement though many residents have defended their actions and stand by their refusal to change.

After the performance, Cherokee Nation's Principal Chief, Chuck Hoskin Jr, released a statement once again requesting that the school remove the mascot stating: "Port Neches-Groves Independent School District continues to use offensive and stereotypical depictions of our tribe, and this is yet again exampled by their cheer team recently in Orlando. For the past couple of years, we have written to the Port Neches superintendent and school board asking them to cease using this offensive imagery, chanting, symbolism and other practices in their school traditions as this does nothing but dishonor us and all Native American tribes who are making great strides in this country. School leaders need educating on cultural appropriateness, should apologize for continuing to ignore our requests to stop and need to make swift changes to correct these offensive displays across their school district."
