= Omaha, Texas =

- village
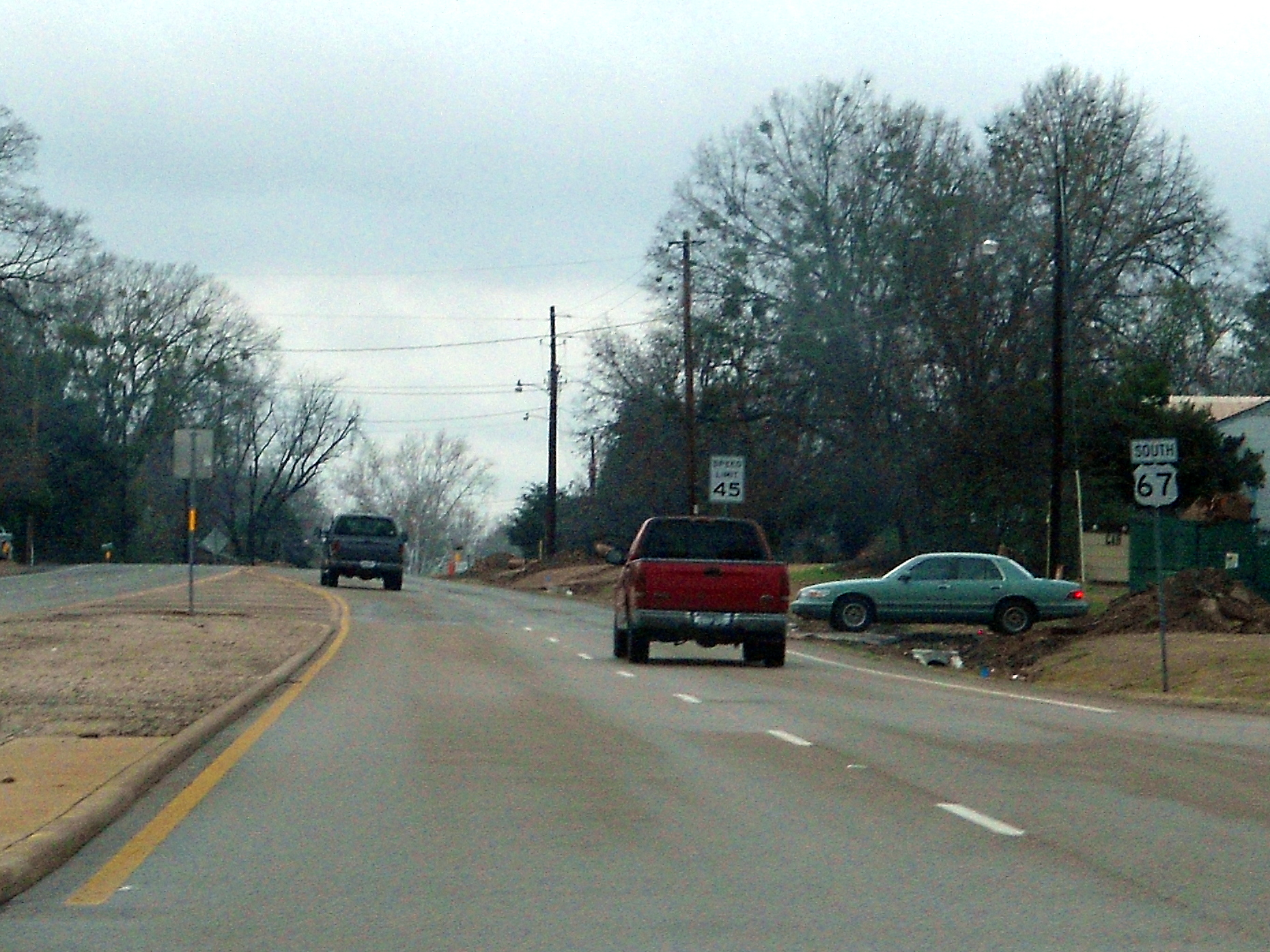
- US 67 in Omaha, Texas

- Location in Morris County and the state of Texas.
- Coordinates: 33°10′56″N 94°44′52″W
- Country: United States
- State: Texas
- County: Morris

Area
  - Total: 1.46 sq mi (3.78 km^{2})
  - Land: 1.45 sq mi (3.76 km^{2})
  - Water: 0.0077 sq mi (0.02 km^{2})
- Elevation: 394 ft (120 m)

Population (2020)
  - Total: 936
  - Estimate (2022): 1,403
  - Density: 674.9/sq mi (260.57/km^{2})
- Time zone: UTC-6 (Central (CST))
  - Summer (DST): UTC-5 (CDT)
- ZIP Code: 75571
- Area codes: 903, 430
- FIPS code: 48-54024
- GNIS feature ID: 2411319
- Website: cityofomahatx.com

Omaha is a city in Morris County, Texas, United States. Its population as of the 2020 census was 933, with 2022 estimate of 1,403.

== History ==
This area of Texas had been lightly settled under Spanish and Mexican rule. It was primarily settled after annexation by the United States by migrants from the South, many of whom arrived before the American Civil War. In that period, farmers had established cotton plantations. It was also an area of pine forests.

Omaha was first named as Morristown in 1880 by former Confederate Lieutenant Thompson Morris; it was a stop on the new St. Louis Southwestern Railway, which spurred the town's development as a trading center. The U.S. Post Office had changed the name to Gavett. In 1886, a group of seven men from Randolph County, Alabama, drew names from a hat to pick a new name; the winner, Hugh Ellis, was allowed to rename the settlement after a town in his home state, and he chose Omaha.

"By 1890, Omaha had three churches, a school, a weekly newspaper, and a population of 450." The town was incorporated in 1914. A new enterprise of raising vegetable-plant seedlings for sale developed in the area. During the 20th century, Omaha was the site of a shipping operation that sent millions of these seedlings to destinations throughout the United States. "In 1980, it had a population of 960 and 23 rated businesses", reaching nearly 1,000 by the end of the 20th century.

== Geography ==
According to the United States Census Bureau, the city has a total area of 1.5 square miles (3.9 km^{2}), all land.

== Demographics ==
Historical population
Census	Pop.	Note	%±
1890	219		—
1920	492		—
1930	506		2.8%
1940	623		23.1%
1950	735		18.0%
1960	854		16.2%
1970	898		5.2%
1980	960		6.9%
1990	833		−13.2%
2000	999		19.9%
2010	1,021		2.2%
2020	936		−8.3%
2022 (est.)	1,403		49.9%
U.S. Decennial Census

=== 2020 census ===
As of the 2020 census, Omaha had a population of 936. The median age was 42.4 years; 23.1% of the residents were under 18 and 22.3% were 65 or older. The female/male ratio was 1:0.850 overall and 1:0.809 for 18 and over.

None of the residents lived in urban areas, while 100.0% lived in rural areas.

Of the 404 households in Omaha, 30.7% had children under 18 living in them, 39.6% were married-couple households, 17.3% were households with a male householder and no spouse or partner present, and 40.3% were households with a female householder and no spouse or partner present. About 33.1% of all households were made up of individuals, and 18.9% had someone living alone who was 65 or older.

The city had 450 housing units, of which 10.2% were vacant. The homeowner vacancy rate was 3.1% and the rental vacancy rate was 7.9%.

Racial composition as of the 2020 census
Race	Number	Percentage
White	675	72.1%
Black or African American	143	15.3%
American Indian and Alaska Native	7	0.67%
Asian	4	0.4%
Native Hawaiian and other Pacific Islander	1	0.1%
Some other race	36	3.8%
Two or more races	70	7.5%
Hispanic or Latino (of any race)	87	9.3%

=== 2022 American Community Survey estimates ===
As of the 2022 American Community Survey, an estimated 1,403 people and 492 households lived in the city, with an average of 2.8 persons per household.

Omaha racial composition estimates as of 2022 (NH = Non-Hispanic) (Note: Note: the US Census treats Hispanic/Latino as an ethnic category. This table excludes Latinos from the racial categories and assigns them to a separate category. Hispanics/Latinos can be of any race.)
Race	Number	Percentage
White (NH)	628	44.8%
Black or African American (NH)	490	34.9%
Native American or Alaska Native (NH)	0	0%
Asian (NH)	0	0%
Pacific Islander (NH)	0	0%
Some Other Race (NH)	26	1.9%
Multiracial (NH)	8	0.67%
Hispanic or Latino	251	17.9%
Total	936	

== Education ==
The City of Omaha is served by the Pewitt Consolidated Independent School District.

== Notable people ==
- Randolph E. (Randy) Moore, a native of Omaha, was inducted into the Texas Baseball Hall of Fame in Arlington.
