= Three Way Independent School District =

School district in Texas

Address
- 247 Cr 207 Stephenville, Erath County, Texas, 76401; United States

District information
- Grades: PK-10
- Superintendent: Dr. Teddy Ott
- Governing agency: Texas Education Agency
- Schools: 1
- Budget: $1.04 million (2015-2016)
- NCES District ID: 4842720

Students and staff
- Students: 142 (2017-2018)
- Teachers: 11.79 (2017-2018)
- Staff: 20.76 (2017-2018)

Other information
- Website: www.twisd.us

Three Way Independent School District is a public school district in Erath County, Texas. A small portion of the district extends into Somervell County.

In 2021, Three Way High School had their first graduating class.

In 2009, the school district was rated "academically acceptable" by the Texas Education Agency.

== History ==
It was reclassified to an independent school district on July 1, 1988. Its ID number changed from #072-050 to #072-901.
