= Blackwell Consolidated Independent School District =

School district in Texas

Coordinates: 32°05′26″N 100°19′21″W

Location
- Blackwell, Texas ESC Region 14 United States

District information
- Type: Independent school district
- Grades: Pre-K through 12
- Superintendent: Abe Gott
- Schools: 2 (2009-10)
- NCES District ID: 4800005

Students and staff
- Students: 737 (2010-11)
- Teachers: 22.00 (2009-10) (on full-time equivalent (FTE) basis)
- Student–teacher ratio: 7.45 (2009-10)
- Athletic conference: UIL Class 1A 6-man Football Division II
- District mascot: Hornets
- Colors: Green and white

Other information
- TEA District Accountability Rating for 2011-12: Academically Acceptable
- Website: Blackwell CISD

Blackwell Consolidated Independent School District is a public school district based in Blackwell, Texas, United States. The district serves southeastern Nolan County, southwestern Taylor County, and a small portion of northeastern Coke County. The district has one high school, Blackwell High School.

== History ==
The district expanded in size on September 1, 1985 since the Divide Independent School District (not the same as the district in Kerr County, Texas) consolidated into it. The name changed from the Blackwell Independent School District to Blackwell CISD as a result of the consolidation.

== Finances ==
As of the 2010–2011 school year, the appraised valuation of property in the district was $274,015,000. The maintenance tax rate was $0.104 and the bond tax rate was $0.007 per $100 of appraised valuation.

== Academic achievement ==
In 2011, the school district was rated "academically acceptable" by the Texas Education Agency. No state accountability ratings were given to districts in 2012.

== Schools ==
Blackwell Consolidated ISD has two campuses - Blackwell High School (grades 7-12) and Blackwell Elementary (grades prekindergarten-6).

== Special programs ==
=== Athletics ===
Blackwell High School plays six-man football.

== See also ==
- List of school districts in Texas
- List of high schools in Texas
