= Roxton Independent School District =

Defunct school district in Texas

Location
- Roxton, Texas; United States

District information
- Type: Public
- Closed: 2019

Other information
- Website: https://www.roxtonisd.org/

Roxton Independent School District was a public school district based in Roxton, Texas (USA).

The district was entirely in Lamar County.

== History ==
In 2009, the school district was rated "academically acceptable" by the Texas Education Agency.

In 2018, the district leadership stated that it wished to consolidate due to financial problems and that it was holding discussions with two potential suitor school districts. There was also consideration of the district becoming elementary only. Roxton ISD and the Chisum Independent School District formed a consolidation agreement, signed by the board of Chisum ISD, and the measure was to be put to the voters.

Roxton ISD closed after the 2018–2019 school year and consolidated with Chisum ISD.
