= Marietta Independent School District =

School district in Texas

Marietta Independent School District was a public school district based in Marietta, Texas (USA). The district had one school, Marietta Elementary, which served students in grades pre-kindergarten through six.

The school closed on September 1, 2008 and merged with Pewitt Consolidated Independent School District.
