= Chisum Independent School District =

School district in Texas

Location
- Paris, Texas; United States
- Coordinates: 33.626507°N 95.567212°W

District information
- Type: Public
- Established: 1985; 40 years ago
- Superintendent: Tommy Chalaire

Students and staff
- Athletic conference: UIL Class 3A
- District mascot: Mustangs
- Colors: Red and Gray

Other information
- Website: chisumisd.org

Chisum Independent School District, or CISD, is a public school district based in the southern portion of Paris, Texas. The district was created on July 1, 1985, by the consolidation of the Delmar and West Lamar School Districts, as the Delmar-West Lamar Consolidated Independent School District, and adopted its present name on August 21, 1986.

The district serves southern portions of Paris, the cities of Roxton and Toco, as well as the communities of Brookston and Petty in Lamar County. A small portion of the district extends into central Delta County, including the community of Lake Creek.

In 2009, the school district was rated "recognized" by the Texas Education Agency. It was rated as "Meets Requirements" in 2022.

== Schools ==
- Chisum High School (Grades 9–12)
- Chisum Middle School (Grades 6–8)
- Chisum Elementary School (Grades PK–5)
