= Amherst, Lamar County, Texas =

Unincorporated community in Texas, US

Amherst
- Unincorporated community
- Location in Texas
- Coordinates: 33.7278836°N 95.4794002°W
- Country: United States
- State: Texas
- County: Lamar
- Elevation: 479 ft (146 m)

Amherst is an unincorporated community in Lamar County, Texas, United States. A post office opened there in 1904 and closed in 1905. It is part of the North Lamar Independent School District.
