= Brenda Cherry =

American civil rights activist (born 1958)

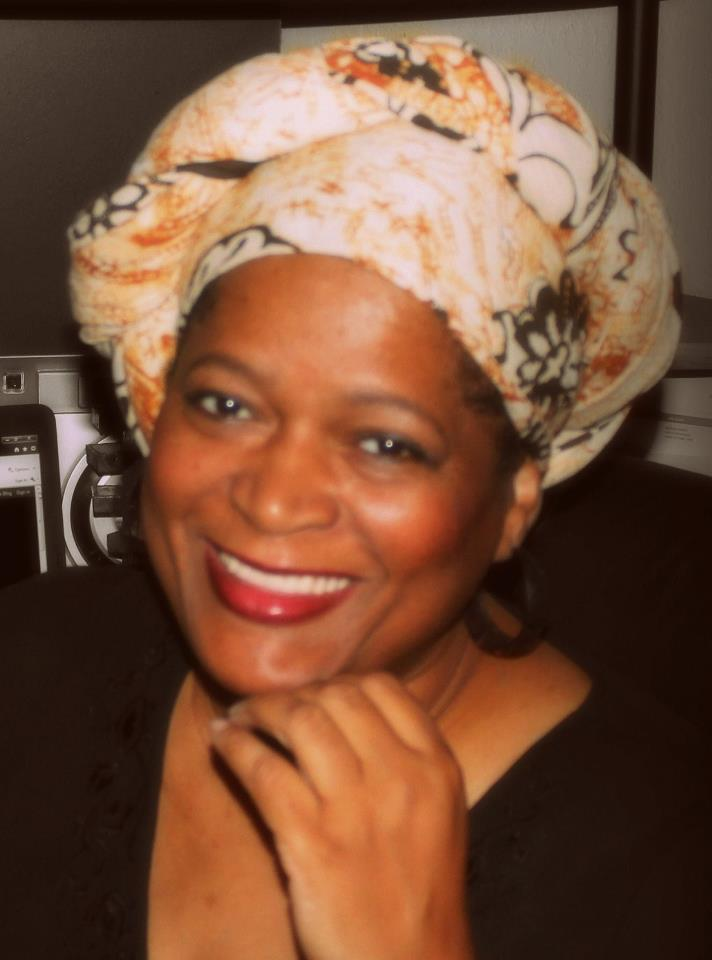
Brenda Cherry

Brenda Cherry (born March 19, 1958) is an American civil rights activist from Paris, Texas.

Cherry is the President and co-founder of Concerned Citizens for Racial Equality, a non-profit civil rights organization located in Paris, Texas. Founded in 2003, CCFRE co-sponsored events with the U.S. Department of Justice, Lone Star Legal Aid, and the American Civil Liberties Union.

== Early life ==
Cherry grew up in Blossom, Texas. Her father, Zeb Reynolds, was a farmer, and her mother, Irene Whitney, was a domestic worker. She began school at T.G. Givens, which was then a segregated school in Paris, Texas. She had to be bused 10 miles to the school even though there was a local school district in the town where she lived. After the schools were forced to integrate, she attended the formerly "whites only" school in Blossom. Cherry graduated from Prairiland High School in Pattonville, Texas. She went on to attend Paris Junior College and East Texas State University. Cherry worked as a Licensed Vocational Nurse for 9 years before becoming a civil rights activist. Cherry has two daughters, Shauncia Cherry and Tiffany Cherry, and one son, Rico Lewis.

== Activism ==
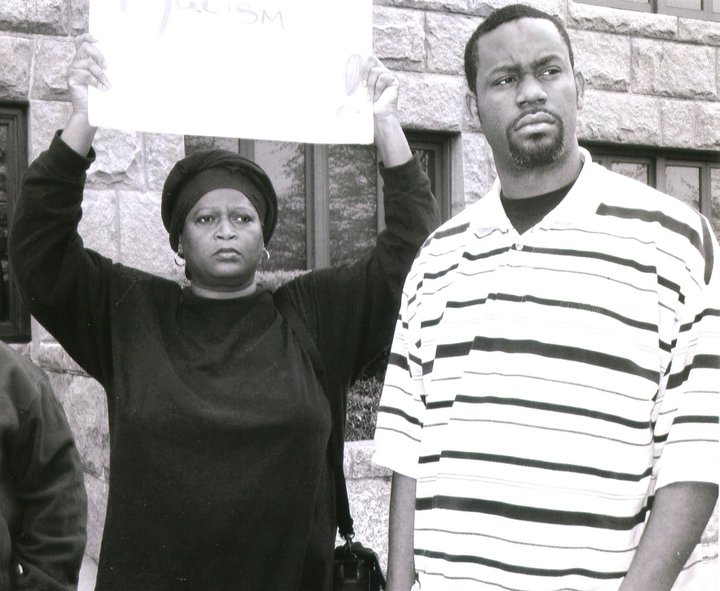
Cherry with Paris resident Patrick Lyons protesting in 2010

=== Schoolyard assault ===
On October 23, 2003, an 11-year-old black student was reportedly attacked by a principal at Crockett Middle School in Paris, Texas. The child was removed from the school and sent to a detention center. Cherry, together with a small group of people, including the child's mother and grandfather, staged a protest in front of the school. During the protest, the child was released from the detention center. This event marked the beginning of several future protest demonstrations in the town.

=== Shaquanda Cotton ===
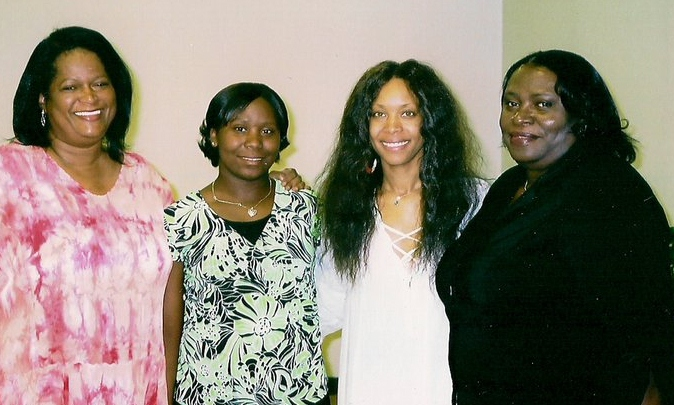
Cherry alongside Shaquanda Cotton, Erykah Badu, and Creola Cotton at the Africa Care Academy 10th Annual Educational Awards Banquet in Dallas, Texas

Shaquanda Cotton was an African-American student who attended Paris High School in Paris, Texas. On March 16, 2006, Cotton, aged 14, was arrested for allegedly shoving a school hall monitor. Having no prior criminal history, Cotton was tried and sentenced to up to 7 years in the Texas Youth Commission. During the same time frame, the judge in the case, Chuck Superville, sentenced a Caucasian 14-year-old girl who had a prior criminal history to probation after committing the confirmed crime of arson. Writer Darwin Campbell with African-American News and Issues broke the story, which garnered attention to Cotton's sentencing. After serving a year and one month in prison, the Chicago Tribune story written by Howard Witt led the case to national exposure. A large protest led by comedian Rickey Smiley was held at the Lamar County Courthouse in Paris, Texas. Approximately two weeks after the Tribune article and protest, ShaQuanda was released. Cherry was interviewed by the BBC regarding Cotton, and the case was included in a BBC documentary by United Kingdom reporter Julian O'Halloran.

=== Brandon McClelland ===
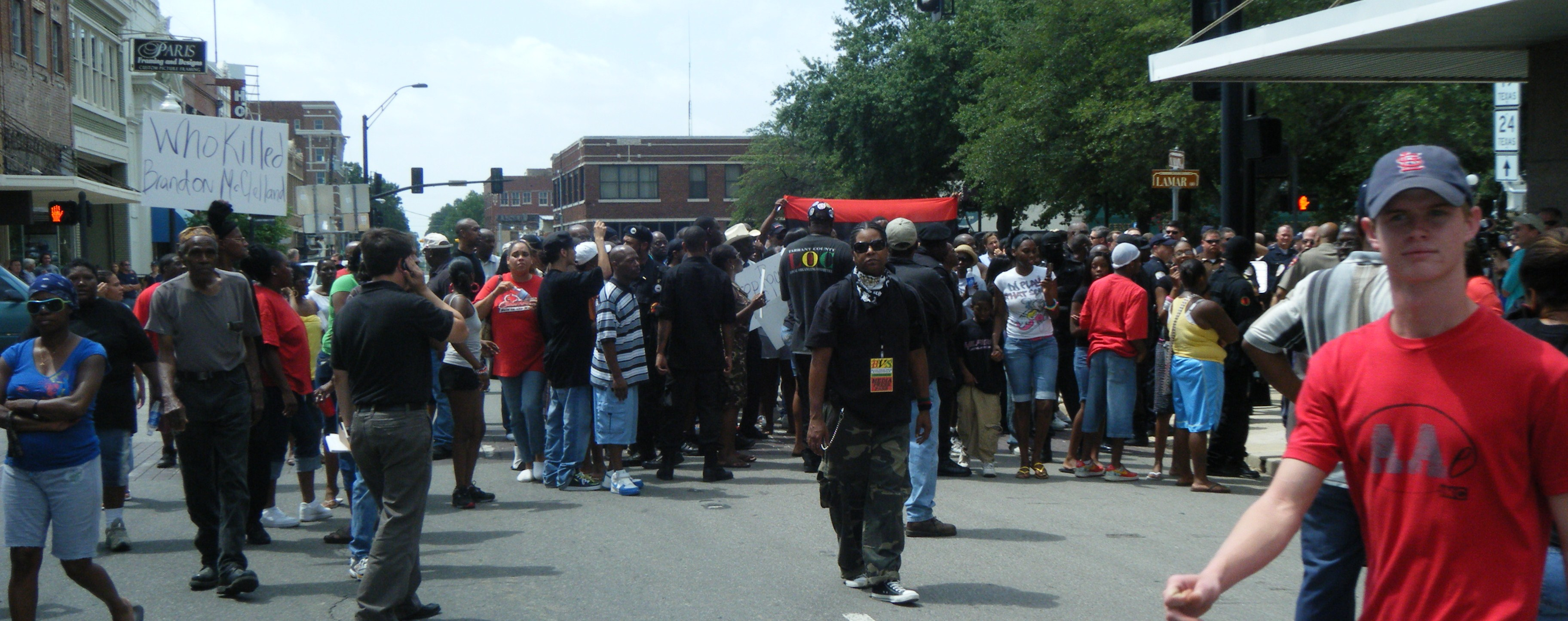
Rally for Brandon McClelland in Paris, Texas

Brandon McClelland was a 24-year-old African-American male who lived in Paris, Texas. On September 16, 2008, his body was found partially dismembered and mutilated on a farm road approximately 17 miles from his home. The local newspaper, The Paris News, reported the death as a hit-and-run by an unknown truck. Due to the activism of Cherry and the Concerned Citizens for Racial Equality, the case gained national attention.

After dispute about whether McClelland was dragged under the truck or behind it, and while awaiting autopsy reports, USA Today interviewed Cherry. "Authorities have not seriously considered the possibility that this was a hate crime. There's a problem in Paris, Texas. I don't see a difference in getting dragged behind a truck and getting dragged under a truck."

Further investigation revealed that McClelland was last seen alive with two Caucasian men, Shannon Finley and Charles Ryan Crostley, both of whom had extensive criminal history. Anderson Cooper 360° reported that the two men were charged with killing McClelland and both subsequently pleaded "not guilty." Special prosecutor Toby Shook cited lack of evidence to the case, and the murder charges were dropped in June 2009. The two men were released. CBS News quoted Cherry, "His body was dragged and nobody gets charged? Even if a trucker came forward, that's all it takes? Even the trucker's not charged? If you hit someone, you don't get charged? Nobody gets charged with this? It's not surprising, but it's sad. It appears that a black man's life means nothing here in Paris." Multiple protests have been led by Cherry, along with Jim Blackwell and the New Black Panther Party. The case remains an open murder investigation.

=== Brandarian Thomas ===
Brandarian Thomas was a 14-year-old African-American student at Travis Junior High School in Paris, Texas. In June 2008, police handcuffed and arrested Thomas at his home for allegedly "touching a female student's butt and crotch" in class. Thomas denied the accusations. Thomas' mother contacted Cherry, who convinced her to take the case to trial rather than accept a plea deal. Texas Observer reporter Forrest Wilder documented the case. Cherry views the Cotton and Thomas prosecutions as extreme examples of a larger pattern of racial discrimination in Paris public schools. Cherry stated, "The black kids are punished more often, more harshly. I think they go to extremes; they punish them for little things. A lot of times, they see a black kid as more menacing." Though prosecutors offered a plea deal to Thomas (two years of probation in exchange for a guilty plea), Cherry helped convince Thomas' mother to take the matter to trial in front of the same judge who heard the Cotton case. "It's ridiculous," Cherry stated. "He was 14. You're going to ruin his life because you can't make him plead guilty?"

=== Cornelius Gill ===
Cornelius Gill was an 18-year-old African-American high-school student in Paris, Texas. On November 11, 2009, Gill was picking up pecans when he was approached by a Paris police officer who questioned him about a stolen car that had been found a few blocks away. Gill refused to be questioned and said a curse word. The officer arrested Gill and placed him in handcuffs behind his back. When another police car pulled up, Gill was lifted and body slammed face down onto the vehicle. Cherry witnessed a portion of the incident and she, along with Gill's mother, filed a complaint with the Paris Police Department. Cherry obtained the video of the incident. Gill was sentenced to 100 days in jail by Judge Chuck Superville. Although the video footage shows no evidence of such, the officer claimed that Gill assaulted him while he was placing him in the patrol car. Gill was charged with Assault of a Public Servant and Resisting Arrest. The complaint resulted in a suspension of the officer, but the suspension was lifted when the officer appealed. The case resulted in an outcry from civilians regarding police brutality and unnecessary force.

According to the Huffington Post, Cherry stated that the ruling sent a message to local police that they could do whatever they wanted. "What's going to stop the officer from doing that again and again? It makes me fearful," she said. The dash cam video was released after Concerned Citizens for Racial Equality filed an open records request. "We're already in a bad situation here in Paris, and this just makes it worse," Cherry stated.

=== Bobby Yates ===
Bobby Yates was a 51-year-old African-American man in Paris, Texas, who was paralyzed from the waist down as the result of a gunshot wound during a hunting accident approximately 20 years earlier. His lower body was removed from his hips down due to an infection. On a late night in 2008, Yates made a 911 call to the local police stating that he had been beaten by a 16-year-old white female and two adult males who were at his home that refused to leave. When the police came, the female claimed that Yates had sexually assaulted her. The two males were with her the entire time. The police sided with the female, and Yates was later arrested and charged with sexual assault. Cherry along with her organization held protests and filed complaints on Yates' behalf. After three years of legal action, the sexual assault charge was dismissed.

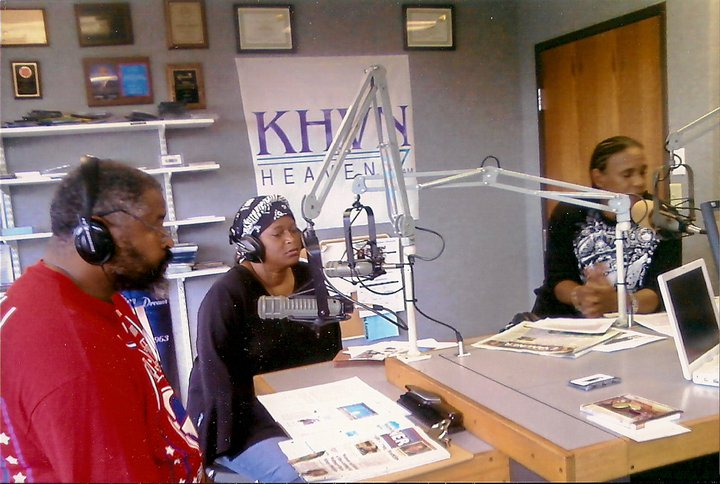
Cherry along with Jim Blackwell on the Robert Ashley Show on KHVN

=== Aaron Hart ===
Aaron Hart was 18 years old when he was arrested and charged with sexual assault. Hart has an intellectual disability and an IQ of 47. Hart had been playing with a five-year-old child and they exposed and touched each other's private parts. At trial, Hart's court-appointed attorney called no witnesses on Hart's behalf and failed to obtain an independent doctor for a competency hearing. Judge Eric Clifford sentenced Hart to 100 years in prison on June 10, 2009, claiming that he had no other choice. Within the same time frame, Clifford had sentenced a defendant charged with the same offense, and without a disability, to four years in prison. Hart was allegedly sexually assaulted while awaiting trial in Lamar County Jail. Cherry and her organization advocated on Hart's behalf. Numerous protest marches were held, led by CCFRE and Jim Blackwell of the Tarrant County Local Organizing Committee. The case gained national attention. "This is just horrible," stated Cherry in a Los Angeles Times article after Judge Clifford made his ruling. "How could the judge not take his mental ability into consideration?"

Hart was given a new trial on appeal. Hart ultimately accepted a plea deal and was sentenced to 10 years in prison where he remains.

=== Turner Industries ===
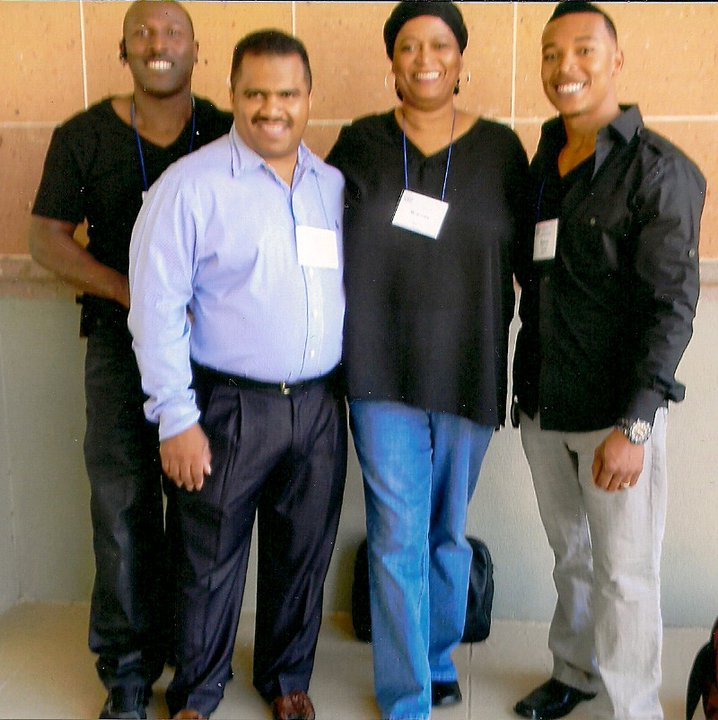
Brenda Cherry with Turner Industries employees in Louisiana

Turner Industries Group is a privately owned industrial construction company with facilities in several cities and states including Paris, Texas. In February 2009, Concerned Citizens for Racial Equality received complaints and photos regarding a noose, racist graffiti, and Confederate flags created and donned by a select group of employees. Activism led to a federal investigation by the Equal Employment Opportunity Commission. The findings led to a federal lawsuit which was settled out of court, as well as changes in Turner Industries employment practices. Cherry stated: "One of my biggest concerns regarding the racist graffiti, noose, and other things found at the plant is the mentality of those who put it there. Those same people serve on juries, and some go on to have supervisory positions or other positions of authority." The Turner Industries investigation was one of the largest civil rights investigations ever undertaken in the State of Texas.

=== Roping and bullying of autistic student ===
On April 20, 2011, a 14-year-old African-American autistic student was taken by an 18-year-old Caucasian student into the greenhouse at Paris High School. The 18-year-old threw a rope over a beam and placed the other end around the waist of the 14-year-old. He kicked his feet and beat his hand with a stick until bloody when the 14-year-old attempted to get free. The girlfriend of the 18-year-old student stood laughing and recorded the incident with her cell phone. When the group returned to class, a male teacher took the recording and erased it. After the school refused to discipline the 18-year-old and his girlfriend, or the teacher who erased the evidence, Cherry and CCFRE advocated on behalf of the mother, Tina Washington, and her son. The county attorney refused to charge the 18-year-old student even though it was a felony offense. Several protests were led by Cherry and Jim Blackwell regarding the incident. The case is currently under investigation by the U.S. Department of Education, Office for Civil Rights.

== Advocacy ==
Concerned Citizens for Racial Equality co-sponsored a community reconciliation meeting with the U.S. Department of Justice which was featured in the Chicago Tribune. "I'm here to talk about racism. I don't see any sense in playing games, pretending it doesn't exist," stated Cherry. "When you go in the schools and see mostly black kids sitting in detention—it's racism. In court, we get high bonds, we get longer sentences. If that's not racism, what is it?

"This town is being forced to look at things they never wanted to look at before," stated Cherry in an excerpt from Newsweek. Cherry, along with Lone Star Legal Aid, a local nonprofit law firm, compiled statistics showing that the Paris Independent School District punished black kids eight times more often than white ones, even though blacks make up a minority of the population. The U.S. Department of Education ruled that there wasn't enough evidence to attribute the discrepancy to racism. The New York Times quoted Cherry, "I think we are probably stuck in 1930 right about now. If you complain about anything, you are going to be punished."

Cherry has been an advocate for civil and human rights, and continues her work to address race and humanitarian issues.
