= Tim Billings =

American football player and coach (born 1957)

Biographical details
- Born: January 4, 1957 (age 69); Lawton, Oklahoma, U.S.

Playing career
- 1976–1979: Southeastern Oklahoma State
- Position: Defensive back

Coaching career (HC unless noted)
- 1980: Duncan HS (OK) (S)
- 1981: Prairiland HS (TX)
- 1982–1983: Norman HS (OK) (S)
- 1983–1984: Missouri (GA)
- 1985–1986: Oklahoma (GA)
- 1987–1988: Missouri (TE)
- 1990–1991: Marshall (DL/ST)
- 1992–1993: Marshall (TE/LB/ST)
- 1994–1998: Marshall (DL/ST)
- 1999: Marshall (DC/LB)
- 2000–2005: Southeast Missouri State
- 2006–2007: Wake Forest (WR)
- 2008–2009: Wake Forest (S)
- 2010: Wake Forest (DE)
- 2011: Wake Forest (Co-DC/ST)
- 2012–2013: Memphis (DL)
- 2014–2015: North Lamar HS (TX)
- 2016–2020: Southern Miss (AHC/DC/S)
- 2020: Southern Miss (interim HC)
- 2022: Southeast Missouri State (OLB)

Head coaching record
- Overall: 27–46 (college); 11–19 (high school)

Accomplishments and honors

Awards
- OVC Coach of the Year (2002)

Tim Billings (born January 4, 1957) is an American football coach and former player. He was the defensive coordinator and interim head coach at Southern Miss. He was the head coach at Southeast Missouri State from 2000 to 2005 and served as the interim head coach at Southern Miss during the 2020 season.

== Coaching career ==
Billings began his college coaching career as a graduate assistant at Missouri and Oklahoma. Billings was part of the 1985 national championship team with Oklahoma. He also won two I-AA national championships as an assistant at Marshall in 1992 and 1996. After his time as an assistant at Marshall, Billings was hired as head coach at Southeast Missouri State in 2000. He resigned in 2005 after a 25–43 record.

Billings was named defensive coordinator at Southern Miss before the 2018 season. He coached the safeties at Southern Miss from 2016 to 2017.

In January 2022, Billings joined the staff at Southeast Missouri State as the outside linebackers football.

== Head coaching record ==
=== College ===
Year	Team	Overall	Conference	Standing
Southeast Missouri State Indians / Redhawks (Ohio Valley Conference) (2000–2005)
2000	Southeast Missouri State	3–8	1–6	7th
2001	Southeast Missouri State	4–7	1–5	6th
2002	Southeast Missouri State	8–4	4–2	T–2nd
2003	Southeast Missouri State	5–7	5–3	T–3rd
2004	Southeast Missouri State	3–8	3–5	7th
2005	Southeast Missouri State	2–9	2–6	7th
Southeast Missouri State:		25–43	16–27	
Southern Miss Golden Eagles (Conference USA) (2020)
2020	Southern Miss	2–3	1–3	6th (West)
Southern Miss:		2–3	1–3	
Total:		27–46		

=== High school ===
Year	Team	Overall	Conference	Standing	Bowl/playoffs
Prairiland Patriots () (1981)
1981	Prairiland	0–10			
Prairiland:		0–10			
North Lamar Panthers () (2014–2015)
2014	North Lamar	6–4	2–3	5th	
2015	North Lamar	5–5	1–4	5th	
North Lamar:		11–9	3–7		
Total:		11–19			
