= Prairiland High School =

Location
- 466 FM 196 South; Pattonville, Texas 75468; United States; 33.571875°N 95.391819°W

Information
- School type: Public high school
- School district: Prairiland Independent School District
- Principal: Jason Hostetler
- Teaching staff: 33.36 (FTE)
- Grades: 9-12
- Enrollment: 281 (2023-2024)
- Student to teacher ratio: 8.42
- Colors: Red, White, and Blue
- Athletics conference: UIL Class 3A
- Mascot: Patriot
- Website: Prairiland High School

Prairiland High School is a public high school located in Pattonville, Texas that serves students in grades 9-12. The school is part of the Prairiland Independent School District which encompasses the southeastern corner of Lamar County and western portions of Red River County. In 2013, the school was rated "Met Standard" by the Texas Education Agency.

== Athletics ==
The Prairiland Patriots compete in the following sports:

- Baseball
- Basketball
- Cross Country
- Football
- Golf
- Powerlifting
- Softball
- Track and Field
- Volleyball

=== State Titles ===
- Volleyball -
  - 2001(2A)
- Baseball -
  - 1986(3A)

==== State Finalists ====
- Volleyball
  - 1994(2A), 2002(2A)

== Achievements ==
- Prairiland High produced the 2001-02 individual overall champion in the UIL Science academic competition.

== Notable alumni ==
- Brenda Cherry, civil rights activist
- Scott Scudder, former MLB pitcher
