= Eiffel Tower (Paris, Texas) =

Landmark in the city of París, Texas

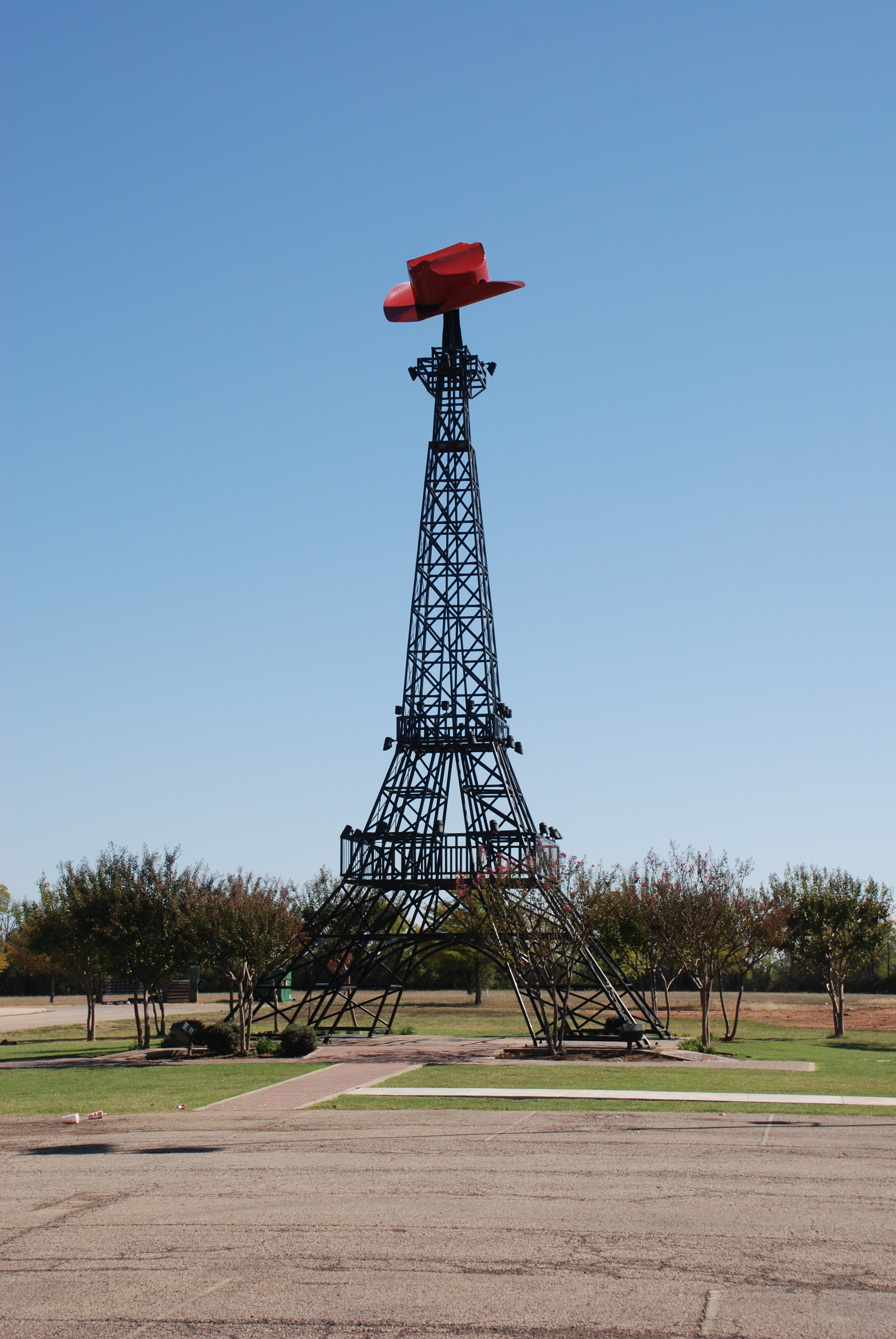
- Eiffel Tower
- Interactive map of the Eiffel Tower area

General information
- Type: Tourist attraction
- Location: Paris, Texas
- Coordinates: 33°38′23.52″N 95°31′25.92″W
- Construction started: 1993
- Completed: 1993

Height
- Height: 65 ft (20 m)

Texas's Eiffel Tower is a landmark in the city of Paris, Texas. The tower was constructed in 1993. It is a rough scale model of the Eiffel Tower in Paris, France; at 65 ft (20 m) in height, it is roughly one-sixteenth of the height of the original. It is located adjacent to the Love Civic Center and the Red River Valley Veterans Memorial in the southeastern part of the city.

== Background ==
It was built in 1993, three years later than the Eiffel Tower in Paris, Tennessee, which is an actual replica of the original Eiffel Tower. Original plans made the construction 5 ft (1.5 m) taller than the one in Tennessee with a cowboy hat added to the top, in a competitive spirit, making the total height 65 ft (20 m).

== Description ==
It was built by members of the local welders’ union. A shiny red cowboy hat was added to the top of the spindle in 1998. The tower has 27 thirty-watt LED lights which are programmed by color according to season (red and green at Christmas), and is also available for expectant parents to utilize the lights for gender reveals.
