= Adams, Lamar County, Texas =

Ghost town in Texas, US

Adams
- Unincorporated community
- Location within Texas
- Coordinates: 33.7048281°N 95.4880113°W
- Country: United States
- State: Texas
- County: Lamar
- Elevation: 499 ft (152 m)

Adams is an unincorporated community in Lamar County, Texas, United States. Situated on Farm to Market Road 195, it was established as a cemetery, with Bertha A. Adams—infant member of the Adams settler family who are the town's namesake—being the first burial, in 1887. The town was officially established in 1896, when Adams Common School reported having one teacher and 24 students. The town's status has remained ambiguous since 1983.
