= Tallant =

Tallant is a surname and occasional given name. Notable people with the name include:

== Surname ==
- Alice Weld Tallant (1875–1958), American physician and professor
- Dave Tallant (1896–1948), American football player
- Maria Tallant Owen (1825–1913, née Tallant), American botanist
- Nicola Tallant (born 1974), Irish investigative journalist
- Steven H. Tallant (born 20th century), American university president

== Given name ==
- Tallant Tubbs (1897–1969), Californian senator

== See also ==
- Tallent (surname)
