= Tallent =

Tallent may refer to:

- Tallent (surname)
- Tallent, Missouri, an unincorporated community in the United States
- Tallent Town, Virginia, an unincorporated community in the United States
