= Sun Valley, Texas =

- City
- Coordinates: 33°40′14″N 95°25′43″W
- Country: United States
- State: Texas
- County: Lamar

Area
  - Total: 0.16 sq mi (0.42 km^{2})
  - Land: 0.16 sq mi (0.42 km^{2})
  - Water: 0 sq mi (0.00 km^{2})
- Elevation: 558 ft (170 m)

Population (2020)
  - Total: 70
  - Density: 429/sq mi (165.7/km^{2})
- Time zone: UTC-6 (Central (CST))
  - Summer (DST): UTC-5 (CDT)
- FIPS code: 48-71356
- GNIS feature ID: 2412004

Sun Valley is a small city in Lamar County, Texas, United States. The population was 69 at the 2010 census, up from 51 at the 2000 census; in 2020, its population was 70.

== Geography ==
Sun Valley is located in eastern Lamar County 7 miles (11 km) east of Paris, the county seat, and 10 miles (16 km) west of Detroit. U.S. Route 82 touches the southern part of the Sun Valley city limits. According to the United States Census Bureau, the city has a total area of 0.2 square miles (0.4 km^{2}), all land. The area drains south to Mulberry Creek, part of the Sulphur River watershed flowing east into Arkansas.

== Demographics ==
Historical population
Census	Pop.	Note	%±
1980	76		—
1990	60		−21.1%
2000	51		−15.0%
2010	69		35.3%
2020	70		1.4%
U.S. Decennial Census

=== 2020 census ===
As of the 2020 census, the city had a population of 70 and a median age of 35.0 years. 25.7% of residents were under the age of 18 and 12.9% were 65 years of age or older; for every 100 females there were 118.8 males, and for every 100 females age 18 and over there were 92.6 males age 18 and over.

0.0% of residents lived in urban areas, while 100.0% lived in rural areas.

There were 34 households in the city, of which 41.2% had children under the age of 18 living in them. Of all households, 41.2% were married-couple households, 14.7% were households with a male householder and no spouse or partner present, and 38.2% were households with a female householder and no spouse or partner present. About 32.3% of all households were made up of individuals and 14.7% had someone living alone who was 65 years of age or older.

There were 36 housing units, of which 5.6% were vacant. The homeowner vacancy rate was 3.6% and the rental vacancy rate was 0.0%.

Racial composition as of the 2020 census
Race	Number	Percent
White	43	61.4%
Black or African American	1	1.4%
American Indian and Alaska Native	0	0.0%
Asian	0	0.0%
Native Hawaiian and Other Pacific Islander	0	0.0%
Some other race	14	20.0%
Two or more races	12	17.1%
Hispanic or Latino (of any race)	23	32.9%

=== 2000 census ===
As of the census of 2000, there were 51 people, 18 households, and 14 families residing in the city. The population density was 332.0 inhabitants per square mile (128.2/km^{2}). There were 31 housing units at an average density of 201.8 per square mile (77.9/km^{2}). The racial makeup of the city was 86.27% White, 13.73% from other races. Hispanic or Latino of any race were 15.69% of the population.

There were 18 households, out of which 50.0% had children under the age of 18 living with them, 61.1% were married couples living together, 11.1% had a female householder with no husband present, and 16.7% were non-families. 16.7% of all households were made up of individuals, and 5.6% had someone living alone who was 65 years of age or older. The average household size was 2.83 and the average family size was 3.07.

In the city, the population was spread out, with 25.5% under the age of 18, 15.7% from 18 to 24, 27.5% from 25 to 44, 27.5% from 45 to 64, and 3.9% who were 65 years of age or older. The median age was 32 years. For every 100 females, there were 121.7 males. For every 100 females age 18 and over, there were 100.0 males.

The median income for a household in the city was $27,500, and the median income for a family was $28,333. Males had a median income of $23,036 versus $26,250 for females. The per capita income for the city was $24,129. None of the population or families were below the poverty line.

== Education ==
Sun Valley is served by the North Lamar Independent School District.

The Texas Education Code specifies that all of Lamar County is in the service area of Paris Junior College.
