= Sumner, Texas =

Unincorporated community in Texas, US

Coordinates: 33°44′25″N 95°40′20″W

Sumner is an unincorporated community in Lamar County, Texas, United States. It is 12 miles west of Paris. The ZIP Code for Sumner is 75486.

== Education ==
The North Lamar Independent School District serves area students.

== History ==
Named to honor an early settler, Moses Sumner, the town had a post office open in 1885. By 1891 the population was 100, and the town was well on its way to prosperity. In 1892 the population was up to 150, and by 1898 the town had a one-teacher school with sixty-three students. In the late 1920s, the population was 250 but no railroad passed through the community. With the coming of the Great Depression and increased postwar mobility, people moved away. In 1983, the town had a business, a school, one church, and a factory. The population was eighty in 2000.
