= Prairiland Independent School District =

Public school district in Pattonville, Texas

Location
- Pattonville, TX ESC Region 8 USA

District information
- Type: Public
- Grades: Pre-K through 12
- Superintendent: Jeff Ballard

Students and staff
- Athletic conference: UIL Class AAA
- District mascot: Patriots
- Colors: Red, White, and Blue

Other information
- Website: www.prairiland.net

Prairiland Independent School District is a public school district based in the community of Pattonville, Texas (USA).

The district is located in eastern Lamar County, and extends into a small portion of western Red River County.

In addition to Pattonville, Prairiland ISD also serves the towns of Blossom and Deport, as well as the community of Cunningham. In Red River County, the district includes that county's portion of Deport.

In 2009, the school district was rated "recognized" by the Texas Education Agency.

== History ==
The district includes what was previously the Cunningham School District.

== District administration ==
- Jeff Ballard- superintendent

== Schools ==
- Prairiland High School (Pattonville) (grades 9-12; principal - Jason Hostetler )
- Prairiland Junior High (Pattonville) (grades 6-8; principal - Brad bassano)
- Blossom Elementary (Blossom) (grades PK-5; principal - leslie Martin)
- Deport Elementary (Deport) (grades PK-5; principal - Lanny Mathews)
