= Deport, Texas =

- City
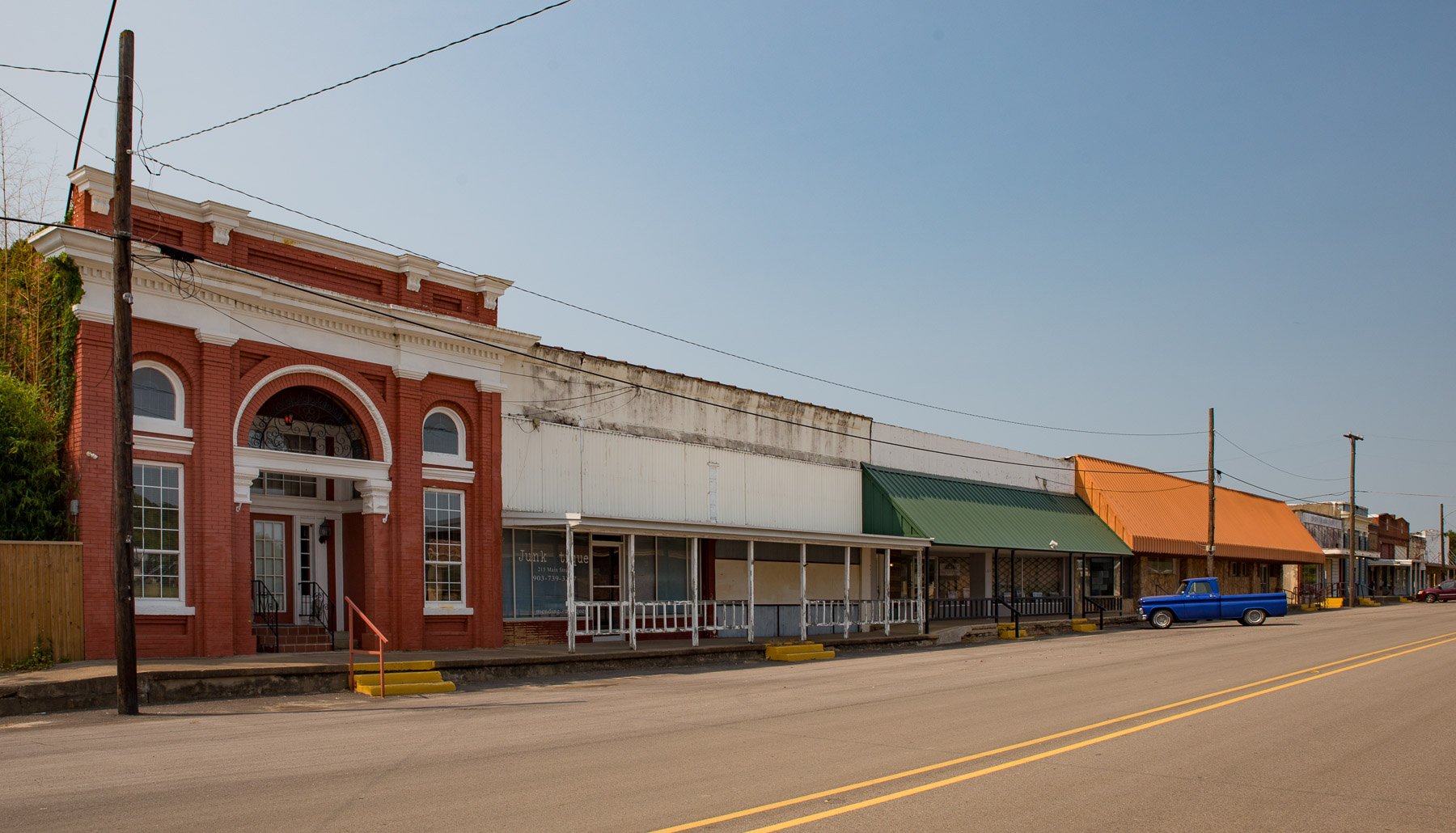
- Downtown Deport (2021)

- Coordinates: 33°31′45″N 95°19′03″W
- Country: United States
- State: Texas
- Counties: Lamar, Red River

Area
  - Total: 1.11 sq mi (2.88 km^{2})
  - Land: 1.11 sq mi (2.88 km^{2})
  - Water: 0 sq mi (0.00 km^{2})
- Elevation: 423 ft (129 m)

Population (2020)
  - Total: 550
  - Density: 501.7/sq mi (193.71/km^{2})
- Time zone: UTC-6 (Central (CST))
  - Summer (DST): UTC-5 (CDT)
- ZIP code: 75435
- Area codes: 903, 430
- FIPS code: 48-20020
- GNIS feature ID: 2410326
- Website: www.deporttexas.gov

Deport is a city in Lamar and Red River counties in the U.S. state of Texas. The population was 550 at the 2020 census.

== History ==
The city has the name of one Colonel Dee Thompson, a pioneer citizen.

== Geography ==
Deport is located primarily in Lamar County. According to the United States Census Bureau, the city has a total area of 1.1 square miles (2.9 km^{2}), all land.

The climate in this area is characterized by hot, humid summers and generally mild to cool winters. According to the Köppen Climate Classification system, Deport has a humid subtropical climate, abbreviated "Cfa" on climate maps.

== Demographics ==
Historical population
Census	Pop.	Note	%±
1890	274		—
1920	821		—
1930	819		−0.2%
1940	822		0.4%
1950	734		−10.7%
1960	639		−12.9%
1970	761		19.1%
1980	724		−4.9%
1990	746		3.0%
2000	718		−3.8%
2010	578		−19.5%
2020	550		−4.8%
U.S. Decennial Census

=== 2020 census ===
As of the 2020 census, Deport had a population of 550; the median age was 41.3 years, with 25.1% of residents under the age of 18 and 21.5% 65 years of age or older. For every 100 females there were 82.7 males, and for every 100 females age 18 and over there were 83.9 males age 18 and over.

0.0% of residents lived in urban areas, while 100.0% lived in rural areas.

There were 232 households in Deport, of which 31.9% had children under the age of 18 living in them, 38.8% were married-couple households, 22.4% were households with a male householder and no spouse or partner present, and 31.5% were households with a female householder and no spouse or partner present. About 31.9% of all households were made up of individuals and 17.2% had someone living alone who was 65 years of age or older.

There were 272 housing units, of which 14.7% were vacant. The homeowner vacancy rate was 2.7% and the rental vacancy rate was 15.2%.

Racial composition as of the 2020 census
Race	Number	Percent
White	487	88.5%
Black or African American	5	0.9%
American Indian and Alaska Native	10	1.8%
Asian	0	0.0%
Native Hawaiian and Other Pacific Islander	0	0.0%
Some other race	16	2.9%
Two or more races	32	5.8%
Hispanic or Latino (of any race)	39	7.1%

=== 2000 census ===
As of the census of 2000, there were 718 people, 286 households, and 189 families residing in the city. The population density was 644.1 inhabitants per square mile (248.7/km^{2}). There were 314 housing units at an average density of 281.7 per square mile (108.8/km^{2}). The racial makeup of the city was 92.62% White, 2.92% African American, 3.06% Native American, 0.14% Pacific Islander, 0.28% from other races, and 0.97% from two or more races. Hispanic or Latino of any race were 0.56% of the population.

There were 286 households, out of which 28.0% had children under the age of 18 living with them, 48.6% were married couples living together, 14.3% had a female householder with no husband present, and 33.9% were non-families. 30.4% of all households were made up of individuals, and 20.6% had someone living alone who was 65 years of age or older. The average household size was 2.28 and the average family size was 2.82.

In the city, the population was spread out, with 21.3% under the age of 18, 7.1% from 18 to 24, 22.8% from 25 to 44, 22.0% from 45 to 64, and 26.7% who were 65 years of age or older. The median age was 43 years. For every 100 females, there were 79.1 males. For every 100 females age 18 and over, there were 68.2 males.

The median income for a household in the city was $24,265, and the median income for a family was $31,761. Males had a median income of $28,750 versus $17,250 for females. The per capita income for the city was $13,702. Below the poverty line were 15.9% of people, 7.5% of families, 14.2% of those under 18 and 10.5% of those over 64.

== Education ==
Deport is served by the Prairiland Independent School District.

The Texas Education Code specifies that all of Lamar County as well as the Red River County section of Prariland ISD are in the service area of Paris Junior College.

== Notable people ==
- Red Schillings, baseball pitcher
