= Milton, Texas =

- Unincorporated community
- Location within Texas Location within the United States
- Coordinates: 33°30′53″N 95°22′28″W
- Country: United States
- State: Texas
- County: Lamar
- Elevation: 420 ft (130 m)
- Time zone: UTC-6 (Central (CST))
  - Summer (DST): UTC-5 (CDT)
- Area codes: 430 & 903
- GNIS feature ID: 1374962

Milton is an unincorporated community in Lamar County, Texas, United States.
