= Paul Elliott Martin =

American bishop

Paul Elliott Martin (31 December 1897 – 1975) was an American bishop of the Methodist Church and the United Methodist Church, elected in 1944. He also distinguished himself as a Methodist pastor and district superintendent, as well as by notable service to his denomination.

== Birth and family ==
Martin was born in Blossom, Texas, the son of Dr. Charles Elliott and Annie Willie (née Black) Martin. He married Mildred Helen Fryar on June 29, 1920.

== Education ==
Martin earned the A.B. degree in 1919 from Southern Methodist University. He also studied theology at S.M.U. He was a member of the Sigma Alpha Epsilon fraternity.

== Military and educational service ==
Martin served as a second lieutenant in the U.S. Army during World War I. He also served for three years as Superintendent of Schools in his birthplace.

== Ordained ministry ==
Martin joined the North Texas Annual Conference of the Methodist Episcopal Church, South, in 1922. He served the following appointments as a pastor: Cedar Hill, Texas; the Maple Avenue Methodist Church in Dallas; Henrietta, Texas; Iowa Park, Texas; and the Kavanaugh Methodist Church in Greenville, Texas. He then was appointed Superintendent of the Wichita Falls District. His final appointment before becoming a bishop was to First Methodist, Wichita Falls, Texas (1938–44).

Rev. Martin was elected a delegate to the last General Conference of the Methodist Episcopal Church, South, in 1938. He was a delegate to the 1939 Uniting Conference of the Methodist Church. He was also a delegate to Methodist general and jurisdictional conferences in 1940 and 1944. He served as the president of the Board of Education of the North Texas Annual Conference, and as a trustee of Southern Methodist University and of Centenary College.

== Episcopal ministry ==
The Rev. Paul Elliott Martin was elected and consecrated a bishop of the Methodist Church by the 1944 South Central Jurisdictional Conference. He was assigned the Arkansas-Louisiana episcopal area. His offices were at 723 Center Street, Little Rock, Arkansas.

== Honors ==
Martin was named to the honorary fraternities Theta Phi and Tau Kappa Alpha. He was awarded the honorary degree Doctor of Divinity in 1938 by Southwestern University.

Bishop Martin also was a member of the Masons and of the "Knife and Fork Club".

== Selected writings ==
- My Call to Preach, 1946

== See also ==
- List of bishops of the United Methodist Church
