= Arthur City, Texas =

Unincorporated community in Texas, US

Coordinates: 33°52′13″N 95°30′22″W

Location of Arthur City in Texas

Arthur City is an unincorporated community in Lamar County, Texas, United States.

The North Lamar Independent School District serves area students.

Its US Postal Service ZIP Code is 75411.
