= Atlas, Texas =

Unincorporated community in Texas, US

Coordinates: 33°34′07″N 95°37′01″W

Atlas is an unincorporated community in Lamar County, in the U.S. state of Texas. It has a population of 20 people.

== History ==
Atlas was laid out in 1884, and named after Atlas, a deity who held up the celestial sphere. A post office was established at Atlas in 1884, and remained in operation until 1943.
