= Willet Babcock =

Willet Babcock, a cabinetmaker, alderman, fireman, and opera house proprietor in Paris, Texas, commissioned the life-sized sculpture of a man wearing cowboy boots that was placed on his own grave.

== Biography ==
Originally from Ithaca, New York, born there in October 1828 according to the gravestone monument that he commissioned, Babcock moved to Paris in the 1850s, where he set up shop with A. A. Walker on South Main Street as a craftsman and furniture dealer, and was instrumental in Paris becoming a centre for furniture manufacturing. In 1860 the shop was the largest output of furniture in Texas, with 500 pieces of furniture made from 35,000 feet (11,000 m) of lumber, bought for $1250 and sold at an estimated total of $6000. By 1870 the census recorded his report of making "400 bedsteads etc." from 77,000 feet (23,000 m) of lumber sold for $7900, at his factory where there was one machine and 15 employees. The factory adopted steam powered machinery in 1875. He was furthermore involved in many other parts of Paris life, being its first alderman and fire chief, running the Babcock Opera House above his second furniture showroom (the Masonic Hall on the corner of Main Street and Kauffman that he purchased in 1863), and as a company director of the Paris Street Railroad Company and the Paris Gas Light Company.

He was also, as many cabinetmakers were, involved in undertaking. By the end of his life a wealthy man, he died on August 27, 1881, having the year before commissioned the stone monument for his own grave, the Willet Babcock Memorial, from the Paris Marble Works. A life-sized statue of a man on a pedestal between two inverted torches, posed leaning against a cross and wearing cowboy boots, it was carved by German immigrant stonemason Gustav Klein, who worked for the Marble Works and whose work can be found at other gravesites in the cemetery where Babcock is buried.

== Sources ==
- Taylor, Lonn; Warren, David B. (2013). "Babcock, Willet". Texas Furniture, Volume Two: The Cabinetmakers and Their Work, 1840–1880. Focus on American History. University of Texas Press. ISBN 9780292745810.
- Morris Little, Carol (1996). A Comprehensive Guide to Outdoor Sculpture in Texas. University of Texas Press. ISBN 9780292760363.
