= Ambia, Texas =

- Unincorporated community
- Location in Texas Location in the United States
- Coordinates: 33°35′34″N 95°39′33″W
- Country: United States
- State: Texas
- County: Lamar
- Elevation: 554 ft (169 m)
- Time zone: UTC-6 (Central (CST))
  - Summer (DST): UTC-5 (CDT)
- Area codes: 903 & 430
- GNIS feature ID: 1379339

Ambia is an unincorporated community in Lamar County, in the U.S. state of Texas.

== History ==
A post office was established at Ambia in 1886, and remained in operation until 1905. The community derives its name from "amber", alluding to the color of the chewing tobacco used by the local men.
