= Cunningham, Texas =

Unincorporated community in Texas, US

Coordinates: 33°25′35″N 95°21′27″W

Cunningham is an unincorporated community in Lamar County, Texas, United States.

The Prairiland Independent School District serves area students.
