= Death of Brandon McClelland =

African American dragging-death victim

Brandon "Big Boy" McClelland (June 27, 1984 – September 16, 2008) was an African-American man whose death sparked racial controversy in the city of Paris, Texas. On September 16, 2008, McClelland was killed when he was first hit and run over by a vehicle, then dragged beneath it.

== Investigation and trial ==
Further investigation revealed that McClelland was last seen alive with two white men, Paris, Texas, residents Shannon Finley and Charles Ryan Crostley, both of whom had long criminal histories with Finley being accused by the victims' family of having ties to white supremacist groups. McClelland had apparently known Finley and Crostley since they were all children and the two white men and McClelland were considered to be friends and had been working together earlier that evening hanging sheetrock.

By the time the police impounded the truck allegedly used, there were signs that it already had been washed, but despite this, police found blood and other physical evidence on the undercarriage of the truck and the blood was identified as belonging to McClelland. The police affidavit for Finley's arrest alleged that McClelland was walking in front of the truck when Finley ran him down, and dragged him at least 40 ft until his body popped out from underneath the chassis. Finley's estranged wife and another of his friends said the defendants told them that, after an argument about who was sober enough to drive, McClelland got out, and Finley bumped him with the truck until knocking him over, and then drove over him and dragged his body under the truck. The two men were charged with killing McClelland and both subsequently pleaded "not guilty." The prosecutor cited a lack of evidence in dropping murder charges in June 2009 and the two men were released.

The case was problem due to a lack of eyewitnesses and physical evidence. A month before the charges were dropped, a truck driver gave a sworn statement admitting that he may have accidentally run over McClelland.

== Aftermath of trial ==
"Justice has not been served for Brandon," Jacqueline McClelland said shortly after the release of Finley and Crostley. "Until I get some justice for my son, it is not over by a long shot." "We plan to get U.S. Attorney General Eric Holder to investigate the handling of this case," Brenda Cherry, president of the local civil rights organization Concerned Citizens for Racial Equality, said "We know it was not investigated properly, and we want an agency outside of Texas to come in and investigate this."

Local activists in Paris and others throughout the nation have been dismayed by the dismissal of charges, and would like to see the incident charged as a hate crime. The victim's mother, Jacqueline McClelland, said, "At the crime scene, it looked like these boys went back and poured beer on my son's body. Two beer cans were lying out there, but the police didn't even pick them up, they just left evidence out there. They won't even consider the racial issues. That's the way it is in Paris." The simmering racial tensions have been inflamed by outside activists according to some residents. A protest at the courthouse in November 2008, featured members of the New Black Panther Party, the Nation of Islam, and the Concerned Citizens for Racial Equality on one side, while white hecklers, waving the Bible gathered on the other side. Brandon McClelland's death has been covered by journalist Howard Witt of the Chicago Tribune, Newsweek, The New York Times, and numerous other national media agencies.
