= Glory, Texas =

Unincorporated community in Texas, US

Coordinates: 33°32′00″N 95°32′22″W

Glory is an unincorporated community in Lamar County, Texas, United States.

== History ==
A post office was established at Glory in 1881, and remained in operation until it was discontinued in 1915. The community was named for the early settlers' optimism.
