= Tallents =

Tallents is a surname. Notable people with the surname include:

- Francis Tallents (1619–1708), English Presbyterian clergyman
- Stephen Tallents (1884–1958), British civil servant and public relations expert

== See also ==
- Tallent (surname)
