= Pattonville, Texas =

Unincorporated community in Texas, US

Coordinates: 33°34′45″N 95°23′32″W

Pattonville is an unincorporated community in Lamar County, Texas, United States. It lies at the intersection of U.S. Route 271 and Texas Farm to Market Road 196, approximately 10 miles southeast of Paris.

The Prairiland Independent School District serves area students; the main campus (featuring the junior high, high school, administration building, and athletic fields) is located in Pattonville.
