= Blossom, Texas =

City in Lamar County, Texas, United States

- City
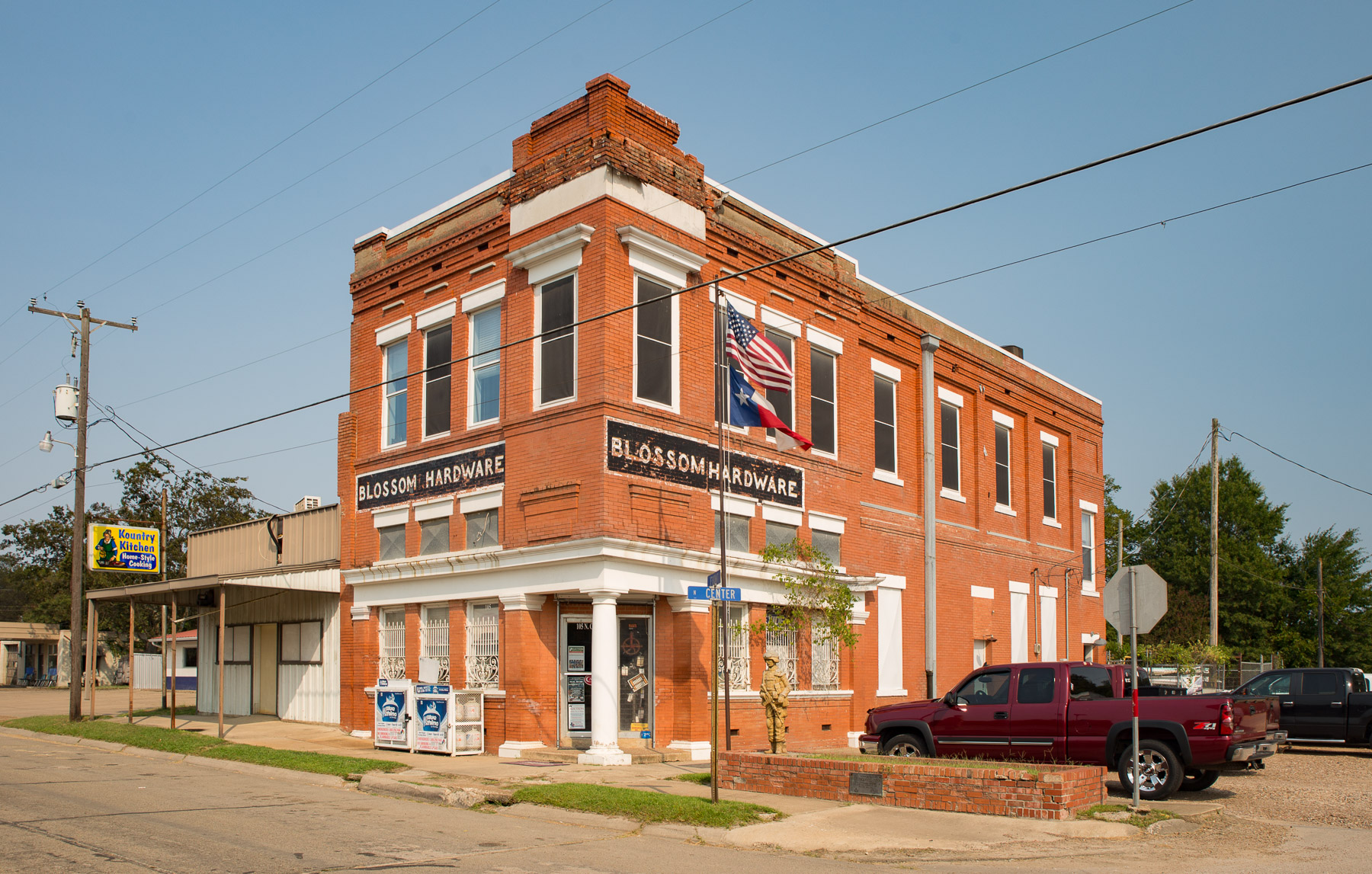
- Blossom Hardware Store, September 2021

- Location within Lamar County
- Coordinates: 33°39′48″N 95°22′41″W
- Country: United States
- State: Texas
- County: Lamar

Area
  - Total: 2.59 sq mi (6.72 km^{2})
  - Land: 2.56 sq mi (6.62 km^{2})
  - Water: 0.042 sq mi (0.11 km^{2})
- Elevation: 518 ft (158 m)

Population (2020)
  - Total: 1,402
  - Density: 549/sq mi (212/km^{2})
- Time zone: UTC-6 (Central (CST))
  - Summer (DST): UTC-5 (CDT)
- ZIP code: 75416
- Area code: 903
- FIPS code: 48-08812
- GNIS feature ID: 2409867
- Website: blossomtexas.gov

Blossom is a city in Lamar County, Texas, United States. The population was 1,402 at the 2020 census.

== History ==
Blossom was originally known as Blossom Prairie, but was shortened to Blossom in 1888. Davy Crockett reportedly entered Texas near Blossom Prairie.

== Geography ==
According to the United States Census Bureau, the city has a total area of 2.5 square miles (6.5 km^{2}), of which 2.5 square miles (6.5 km^{2}) is land and 0.04 square miles (0.10 km^{2}) (1.57%) is water.

== Demographics ==
Historical population
Census	Pop.	Note	%±
1880	639		—
1890	695		8.8%
1900	874		25.8%
1910	871		−0.3%
1920	969		11.3%
1930	650		−32.9%
1940	858		32.0%
1950	780		−9.1%
1960	545		−30.1%
1970	816		49.7%
1980	1,487		82.2%
1990	1,440		−3.2%
2000	1,439		−0.1%
2010	1,494		3.8%
2020	1,402		−6.2%

=== 2020 census ===
As of the 2020 census, Blossom had a population of 1,402, 567 households, and 369 families residing in the city. The median age was 37.7 years. 24.9% of residents were under the age of 18 and 16.1% of residents were 65 years of age or older. For every 100 females there were 87.9 males, and for every 100 females age 18 and over there were 87.4 males age 18 and over.

0% of residents lived in urban areas, while 100.0% lived in rural areas.

There were 567 households in Blossom, of which 34.9% had children under the age of 18 living in them. Of all households, 45.3% were married-couple households, 18.7% were households with a male householder and no spouse or partner present, and 30.2% were households with a female householder and no spouse or partner present. About 27.9% of all households were made up of individuals and 11.9% had someone living alone who was 65 years of age or older.

There were 630 housing units, of which 10.0% were vacant. Among occupied housing units, 61.0% were owner-occupied and 39.0% were renter-occupied. The homeowner vacancy rate was 2.5% and the rental vacancy rate was 5.2%.

Racial composition as of the 2020 census
Race	Percent
White	85.2%
Black or African American	2.4%
American Indian and Alaska Native	2.4%
Asian	0.4%
Native Hawaiian and Other Pacific Islander	0%
Some other race	3.9%
Two or more races	5.7%
Hispanic or Latino (of any race)	7.4%

=== 2000 census ===
As of the census of 2000, there were 1,439 people, 571 households, and 424 families residing in the city. The population density was 573.2 inhabitants per square mile (221.3/km^{2}). There were 606 housing units at an average density of 241.4 per square mile (93.2/km^{2}). The racial makeup of the city was 94.30% White, 2.08% African American, 1.18% Native American, 0.14% Asian, 1.39% from other races, and 0.90% from two or more races. Hispanic or Latino of any race were 6.67% of the population.

There were 571 households, out of which 34.2% had children under the age of 18 living with them, 59.5% were married couples living together, 9.8% had a female householder with no husband present, and 25.7% were non-families. 23.3% of all households were made up of individuals, and 11.9% had someone living alone who was 65 years of age or older. The average household size was 2.52 and the average family size was 2.96.

In the city, the population was spread out, with 26.7% under the age of 18, 8.4% from 18 to 24, 27.2% from 25 to 44, 24.2% from 45 to 64, and 13.6% who were 65 years of age or older. The median age was 35 years. For every 100 females, there were 103.0 males. For every 100 females age 18 and over, there were 92.2 males.

The median income for a household in the city was $28,235, and the median income for a family was $33,750. Males had a median income of $27,813 versus $21,136 for females. The per capita income for the city was $15,143. About 10.9% of families and 12.7% of the population were below the poverty line, including 15.9% of those under age 18 and 13.7% of those age 65 or over.

== Education ==
The city of Blossom is served by the Prairiland Independent School District.

The Texas Education Code specifies that all of Lamar County is in the service area of Paris Junior College.

== Notable person ==
- Paul Elliott Martin, bishop in the Methodist Church

== See also ==
- List of municipalities in Texas
