= Tallent (surname) =

Tallent is the surname of the following people:

- Claire Tallent (born 1981), Australian racewalker
- Elizabeth Tallent (born 1954), American fiction writer, academic, and essayist
- Garry Tallent (born 1949), American musician and record producer
- Jared Tallent (born 1984), Australian race walker, husband of Claire, brother of Rachel
- Rachel Tallent (born 1993), Australian racewalker, sister of Jared

== See also ==
- Tallant
- Tallents
