= Steven H. Tallant =

American academic administrator

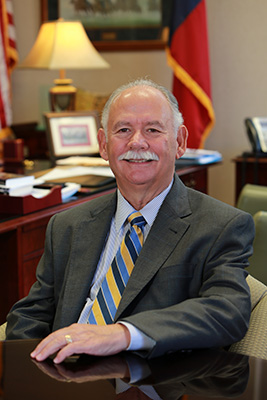
Steven H. Tallant, Ph.D.

Steven H. Tallant is the former president of Texas A&M University-Kingsville, a part of the Texas A&M University System. He was succeeded by Dr. Mark A. Hussey in January 2019. He is a member of the executive committee for the Texas Council of Public Universities Presidents and Chancellors and a past chair of the Lone Star Council of Presidents. Tallant has been a member of several off-site review committees for the Southern Association of Colleges and Schools Commission on College. In addition, he is a board member for KEDT/South Texas Public Broadcasting System, Inc.

== Early life ==
Tallant was raised in Paris, Texas, and graduated from Paris Junior College.

Tallant earned his B.A. in sociology from the University of Florida, his M.S.W. from the University of Utah, and his Ph.D. in social welfare from the University of Wisconsin-Madison. He also is a graduate of the Governor's Executive Development Program through the Lyndon B. Johnson School of Public Affairs at The University of Texas.

== Military service ==
Tallant enlisted in the United States Navy after graduating from junior college and was stationed at NATO-Naval Support Activity in Naples, Italy. In 1973, he left military service at the rank of RM2 (radioman second class).

In 1978, he re-entered military service as a commissioned officer in the United States Air Force. He spent the next 16 years as a uniformed social worker with stints at Elsworth AFB (South Dakota), Scott AFB (Illinois), Lajes Field (Azores), and Keesler AFB (Mississippi). His final assignment was at the Pentagon where he served as chief of Air Force Family Research.

== Career in higher education ==
Tallant began his career in academia after retiring from the U.S. Air Force in 1994. He joined the Department of Social Work at the University of Wisconsin-Eau Claire in September 1994 as a professor of social work. In 2000, he became associate vice chancellor and director of graduate programs and then served as interim provost in 2004.

In November 2004, he was named associate vice chancellor for academic affairs before serving again as interim provost from 2005 to 2007. In 2007, Tallant became provost and vice chancellor for academic affairs at the University of Wisconsin-Eau Claire where he was responsible for all undergraduate and graduate academic programs. He also provided leadership in several restructuring initiatives, including the creation of the College of Education and Human Sciences and the College of Nursing and Health Services.

His research areas include ethical dilemmas for military social workers, for which he has been widely cited; meta-analysis; and group work.

Tallant became the 19th president of Texas A&M University-Kingsville in October 2008. In his first six years as president, the university experienced a 54 percent increase in enrollment and a 44 percent increase in research expenditures.

He has been recognized for his commitment to higher education and the community many times throughout his career; most recently; he received the 2013 “Citizen of the Year Award” from the Kingsville Noon Rotary Club and the 2013 “Community Leader Award” from LULAC Council 1. He also is a recipient of the President's Award from the Corpus Christi chapter of the NAACP and the “Humanitarian of the Year” from LULAC Council #1. In 2011, he was named “Citizen of the Year” by the Kingsville Chamber of Commerce and in 2010 he was named “Newsmaker of the Year” by the Kingsville Record. The Kleberg Hispanic Chamber of Commerce honored him with its “Special Leadership Award” in 2011.

In 2012, Texas A&M University System Chancellor John Sharp appointed him to the Texas A&M System Office of Sponsored Research Services Advisory Board. The same year, State Representative Todd Hunter appointed him to the Education Workforce Task Force in Corpus Christi.
