= North Lamar Independent School District =

School district in Texas

North Lamar High School

Location
- 295 Stone Avenue; Paris, (Lamar County), Texas 75460; United States; 33.692413°N 95.551597°W

Information
- Type: Public high school
- Principal: Mark Keith
- Staff: 58.87 (FTE)
- Enrollment: 671 (2023-24)
- Student to teacher ratio: 11.40
- Colors: Blue and gold
- Nickname: Panthers
- Website: North Lamar High School

North Lamar Independent School District is a public school district based in Paris, Texas (USA).

The district serves northern portions of Paris, the cities of Reno and Sun Valley, as well as the census-designated place of Powderly, in northern Lamar County. Also within the Lamar County section of this district are the unincorporated communities of Arthur City, Chicota, and Sumner. A very small portion of northeastern Fannin County also lies within the district. North Lamar ISD is also the largest 4A school district in northeast Texas, by land size.

In 2009, the school district was rated "recognized" by the Texas Education Agency.

In August 2024, the new North Lamar Intermediate School was opened serving grades two through five. It’s located at 310 NL Parkway Paris, Texas 75460.

In August 2025, the newly renovated Cecil Everett Elementary was opened to welcome students and parents. W.L. Higgins Elementary was closed permanently.

On July 6, 2017, North Lamar ISD developed their own Police Department consisting of one Chief and three officers. Another police officer position was added in 2022 to satisfy new Texas state law by placing one officer on each campus. The officers are strategically placed throughout the district for the protection of the students, staff and community. Their goal is to provide a safe learning environment while making a positive impact in the lives of the students.

== Academics ==
- State Titles
  - Policy Debate
    - 2012 (3A)
    - 2018 (4A)
    - 2019 (4A)
  - Congressional Debate
    - 2019 (4A)
  - Persuasive Speaking
    - 2019 (4A)
  - Informative Speaking
    - 2019 (4A)

== District Administration ==
- Superintendent - Kelli Stewart
- Assistant Superintendent - Leslie Watson
- North Lamar High School Principal - Mark Keith
- Frank Stone Middle School Principal - Amanda Moore
- North Lamar Intermediate School - Shelly Bivens
- Aaron Parker Elementary School Principal - Amber Soliz
- Cecil Everett Elementary School Principal - Lori Malone
- Chief of Police - Mike Boaz

== Board of trustees ==
- President- Sheila Daughtrey
- Vice President- Clint Spencer
- Secretary- Lauren Woodard
- Member- Mike Davidson
- Member- Clay Spencer
- Member- Joel Sanders
- Member- Luke Krogman

== Schools ==
North Lamar ISD has five schools - five are located in Paris and one (Parker Elementary) is located in Powderly.

- North Lamar High School- Grades 9-1212
- Frank Stone Middle School- Grades 6-8

Enrollment is approximately 700

- North Lamar Intermediate School- Grades 2-5
- Everett Elementary School- Grades Pre-K - 1
- Aaron Parker Elementary School- Grades PK-2
- Bailey Success Center/Alternative

== School song ==
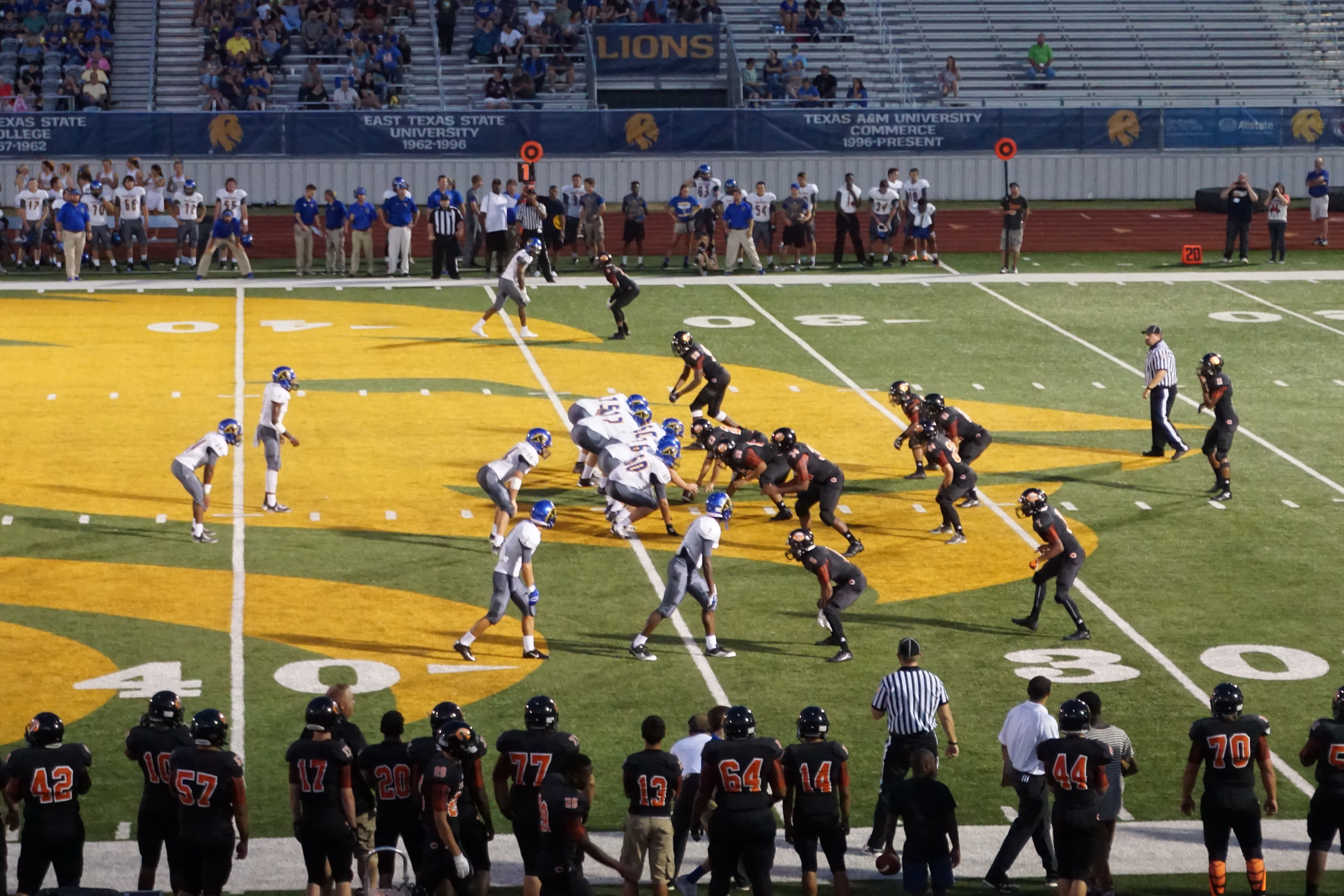
The North Lamar Panthers football team in action against the Commerce Tigers in 2015.

(To the tune of “Love Me Tender”)
We will raise our voice in song
To our Alma Mater true
Our hearts are filled with loyalty
To our colors-Gold and Blue
North Lamar, North Lamar
We're proud to claim your name
And as years go by you'll grow
In Honor and in fame.

== History ==
The history of North Lamar goes back to the 68 rural school districts that once existed throughout the communities in the northern half of Lamar County. Upon the consolidation of Powderly-Reno and Central school districts in 1970-71, the district became known as North Lamar Independent School District. In 1975, the Chicota schools joined the district. The area economy includes manufacturing, farming and ranching. With an enrollment of approximately 2,350 students, North Lamar ISD has one high school, one middle school, and three elementary schools to serve the students in the district.

== Notable faculty ==
- Marsha Farney, former faculty member at North Lamar; Republican member of the Texas House of Representatives from District 20 in Williamson County
