= Eiffel Tower (Paris, Tennessee) =

Landmark in the city of Paris, Tennessee

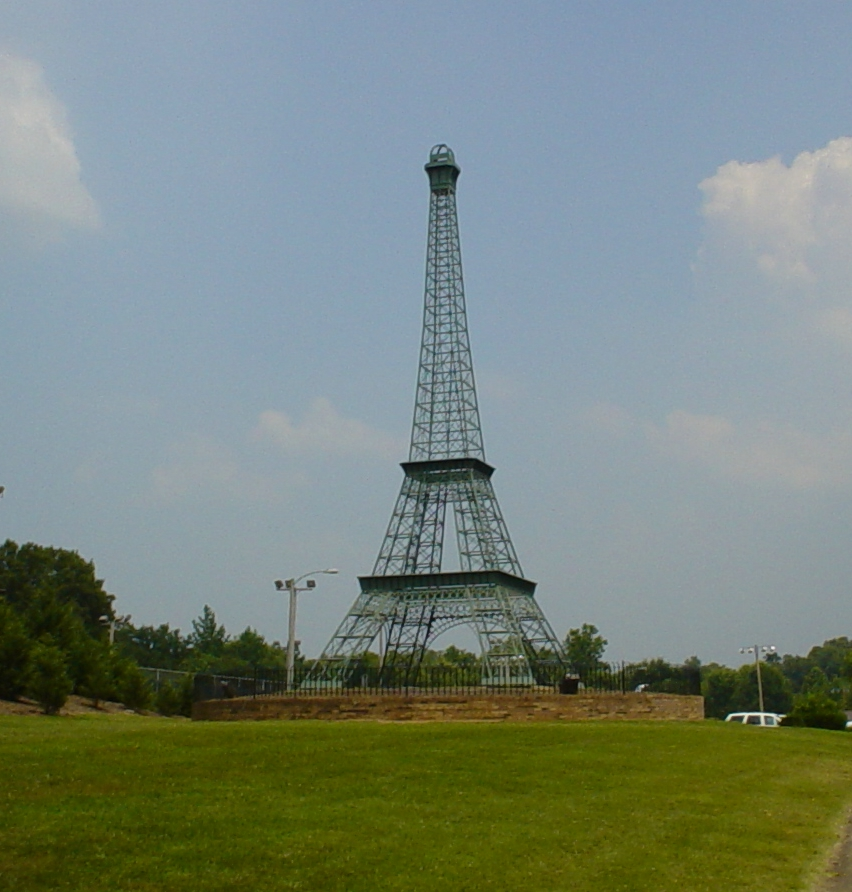
- Towering over Memorial Park
- Interactive map of the Eiffel Tower area

General information
- Type: Tourist attraction
- Location: Paris, Tennessee, United States
- Coordinates: 36.286967°N 88.301535°W
- Construction started: 1990
- Completed: 1990

Height
- Height: 60 feet (18 m)

The Eiffel Tower is a landmark in the city of Paris, Tennessee. At 60 feet (18 m) tall, it is a 1:20 scale replica of the original located in Paris, France.

== Background ==
=== Origin at Christian Brothers University ===
Engineering students at Christian Brothers University originally constructed the tower to commemorate the 1990 Memphis in May festival. Each year, the festival honors a country, and 1990 focused on France.

According to Brother Patrick O'Brien, a public relations official for the university at the time: "[the tower] was the centerpiece of one of our most popular quads." Regardless, the wooden tower was a temporary structure. Moreover, it could not remain at the university because students began to climb it even though it could not support their weight.

=== Finding a new home in Paris ===
In April 1991, the Paris-Henry County Chamber of Commerce sponsored "Paris U.S.A.," an event created to celebrate the shared charm of the fifteen U.S. cities named for the French capital. Representatives from five Parises accepted their invitations to enjoy Paris U.S.A. in Paris, Tennessee.

During the fall of that year, Brother Patrick O'Brien remembered the celebration and asked Paris if it would be interested in accepting a scale replica of the Eiffel Tower. The city accepted, and the job began.

== Construction and reconstruction ==
=== Initial construction ===
The tower was designed to scale by Tom Morrison, professor emeritus of civil engineering; Jim Jacobs, assistant professor of mechanical engineering; and Roland Raffanti, engineering lab technician, from Christian Brothers University. According to Brother Patrick O'Brien, Morrison designed the model based on the original drawings of Gustave Eiffel. At 60 feet (18 m) tall, the tower is a nearly perfect 1:20 scale replica of the original.

Built through the labor of more than 10,000 hours donated by CBU students, faculty, alumni, and friends, the tower contains 500 pieces of Douglas fir and 6,000 steel rods. The monument was assembled in CBU's Buckman Quadrangle.

After CBU dismantled the tower, the parts were delivered to Paris in February 1992 and given two coats of paint. The Paris Public Works Department reassembled the tower in Memorial Park.

=== Dedication ===
The landmark was dedicated January 29, 1993. Paris acknowledged CBU's generous gesture with a joyful dedication ceremony and a plaque at the base of the tower.

=== Strengthening the structure ===
After deterioration to the wood structure, Keith Jackson, owner of Precision Grinding and Machine of Paris, recreated the original wood replica into a steel structure that still stands today. To accomplish the feat, PGM constructed the tower in three sections and trailered each section to Memorial Park where it was finally erected.
