= Paris, Texas =

City in the United States

- City
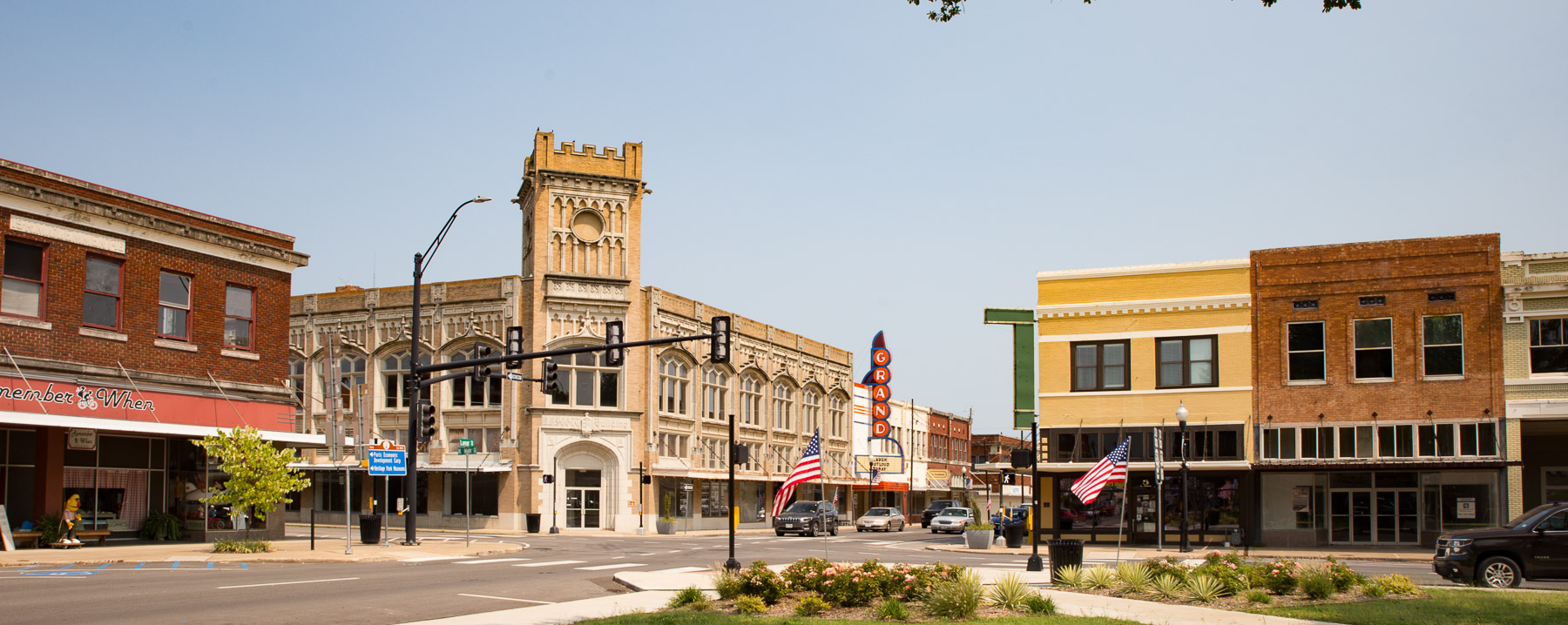
- Historic Downtown Paris (2021)
- Motto: Where Texans Reach Higher
- Location with Lamar County and Texas
- Coordinates: 33°38′20″N 95°32′46″W
- Country: United States
- State: Texas
- County: Lamar
- Settled: by 1824
- Named: 1844
- Incorporated: 1845
- Named for: Paris, France

Area
  - Total: 37.07 sq mi (96.00 km^{2})
  - Land: 35.19 sq mi (91.14 km^{2})
  - Water: 1.88 sq mi (4.86 km^{2})
- Elevation: 591 ft (180 m)

Population (2020)
  - Total: 24,476
  - Density: 695.6/sq mi (268.6/km^{2})
- Time zone: UTC−6 (Central (CST))
  - Summer (DST): UTC−5 (CDT)
- ZIP codes: 75460-75462
- Area code: 903/430
- FIPS code: 48-55080
- GNIS feature ID: 2411371
- Website: paristexas.gov

Paris is a city in and the county seat of Lamar County, Texas, United States. Located in Northeast Texas at the western edge of the Piney Woods, the population of the city was 24,171 in 2020.

== History ==
Present-day Lamar County was part of Red River County during the Republic of Texas. By 1840, population growth necessitated the organization of a new county. George Washington Wright, who had served in the Third Congress of the Republic of Texas as a representative from Red River County, was a major proponent of the new county. The Fifth Congress established the new county on December 17, 1840, and named it after Mirabeau B. Lamar, who was the first vice president and the second president of the Republic of Texas.

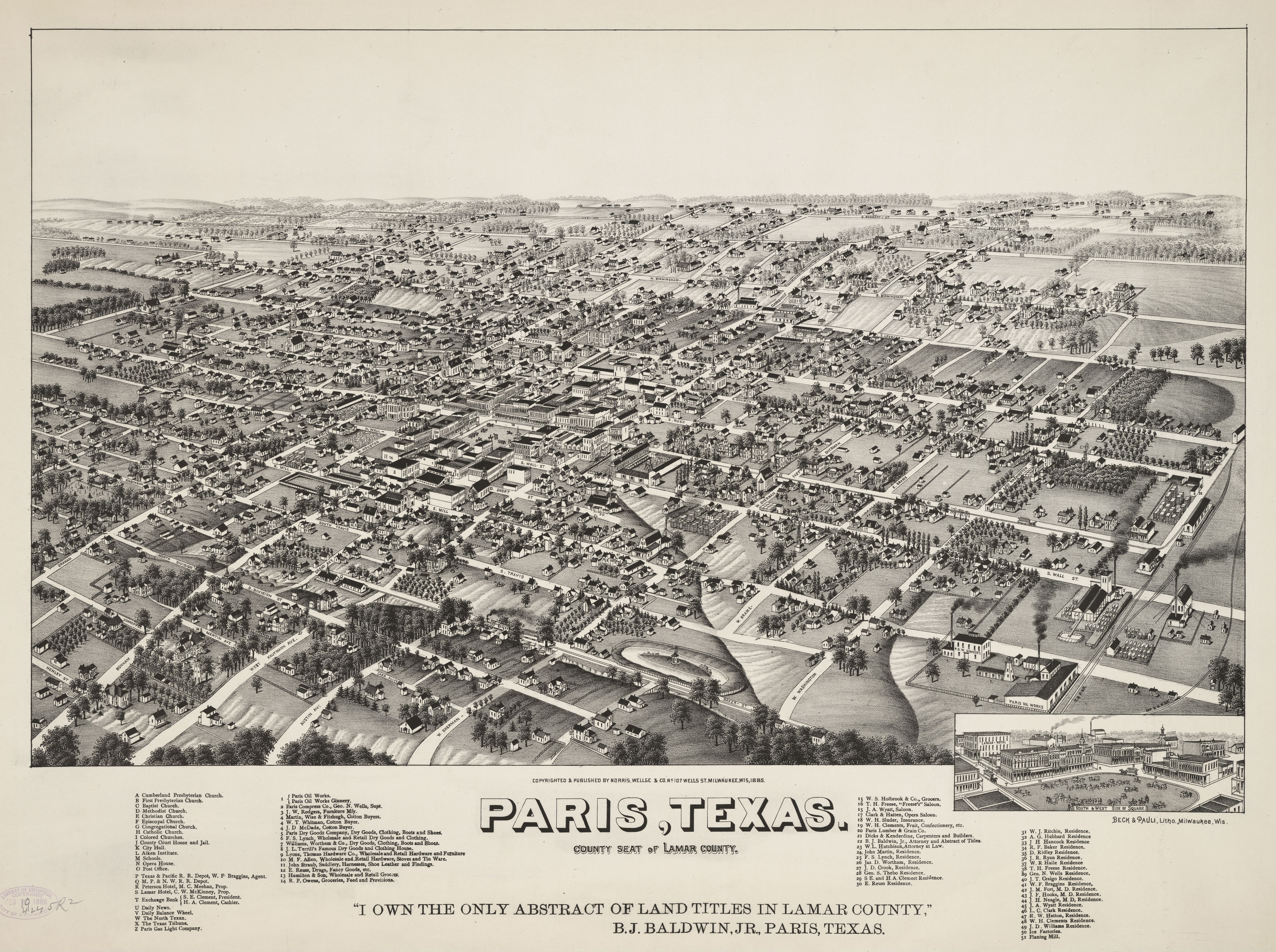
Paris, Texas in 1885

Lamar County was one of the 18 Texas counties that voted against secession on February 23, 1861.

In 1877, 1896, and 1916, major fires in the city forced considerable rebuilding. The 1916 fire destroyed almost half the town and caused an estimated $11 million in property damage. The fire ruined most of the central business district and swept through a residential area. The burned structures included the Federal Building and Post Office, the Lamar County Courthouse and Jail, City Hall, most commercial buildings, and several churches.

In 1893, black teenager Henry Smith was accused of murder, tortured, and then burned to death on a scaffold in front of thousands of spectators in Paris. In 1920, two black brothers from the Arthur family were tied to a flagpole and burned to death at the Paris fairgrounds. The city has prominent memorials to the Confederacy.

In 1943, the U.S. Supreme Court in Largent v. Texas struck down a Paris ordinance that prohibited a person from selling or distributing religious publications without first obtaining a city-issued permit. The court ruled that the ordinance abridged freedom of religion, freedom of speech, and freedom of the press in violation of the Fourteenth Amendment to the United States Constitution.

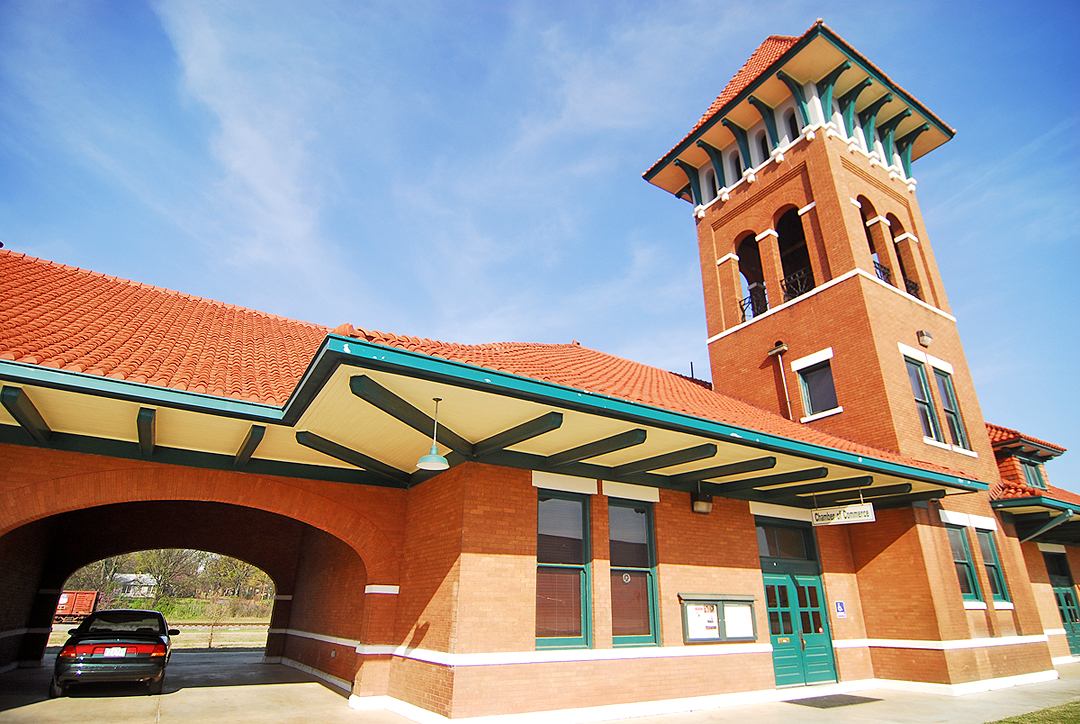
Historic Paris train station

Paris is a former railroad center. The Texas and Pacific reached town in 1876; the Gulf, Colorado and Santa Fe Railway (later merged into the Atchison, Topeka and Santa Fe Railway) and the Frisco in 1887; the Texas Midland Railroad (later Southern Pacific) in 1894; and the Paris and Mount Pleasant (Pa-Ma Line) in 1910. Paris Union Station, built 1912, served Frisco, Santa Fe, and Texas Midland passenger trains until 1956. Today, the station is used by the Lamar County Chamber of Commerce and serves as the research library for the Lamar County Genealogical Society.

Following a tradition of American cities named "Paris" (named after France's capital), the city commissioned a 65-foot-tall (20 m) replica of the Eiffel Tower in 1993 and installed it on site of the Love Civic Center, southeast of the town square. In 1998, presumably as a response to the 1993 construction of a 60-foot-tall (18 m) tower in Paris, Tennessee, the city placed a giant red cowboy hat atop its tower. The current Eiffel Tower replica is at least the second one; an earlier replica constructed of wood was destroyed by a tornado.

=== Race relations ===
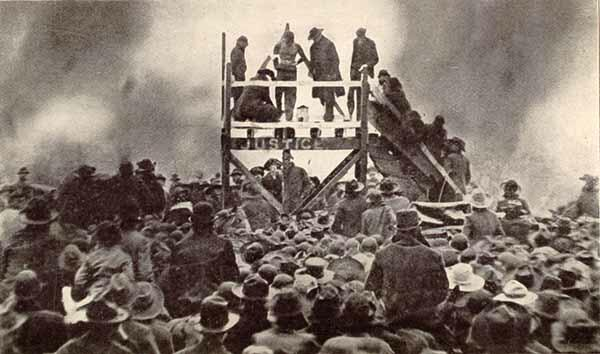
Lynching of Henry Smith, Paris Fairgrounds, 1893

Paris during its earlier period had some troubling history .

In the late-19th and early-20th centuries, several lynchings were staged at the Paris Fairgrounds as public spectacles, with crowds of White spectators cheering as the African-American victims were tortured and murdered. A black teenager named Henry Smith was lynched in 1893. His murder was the first lynching in US history that was captured in photographs sold as postcards and other trinkets commemorating the killing. Journalist Ida B. Wells said of the incident, "Never in the history of civilization has any Christian people stooped to such shocking brutality and indescribable barbarism as that which characterized the people of Paris, Texas."

On July 7, 1920 Irving and Herman Arthur were burned alive at the fairgrounds before a crowd of 3,000, their charred corpses then being dragged by a convoy of White people through Paris's African-American neighborhood as a warning to the black community.

In 2007, a 14-year-old African-American girl was sentenced by a local judge to up to seven years in a youth prison for shoving a hall monitor at Paris High School. Three months earlier, the same judge had sentenced a 14-year-old White girl to probation for arson. This sentencing disparity occasioned nationwide controversy and the African-American girl was released after serving one year on orders of a special conservator appointed by the State of Texas to investigate problems with the state's juvenile-justice practices.

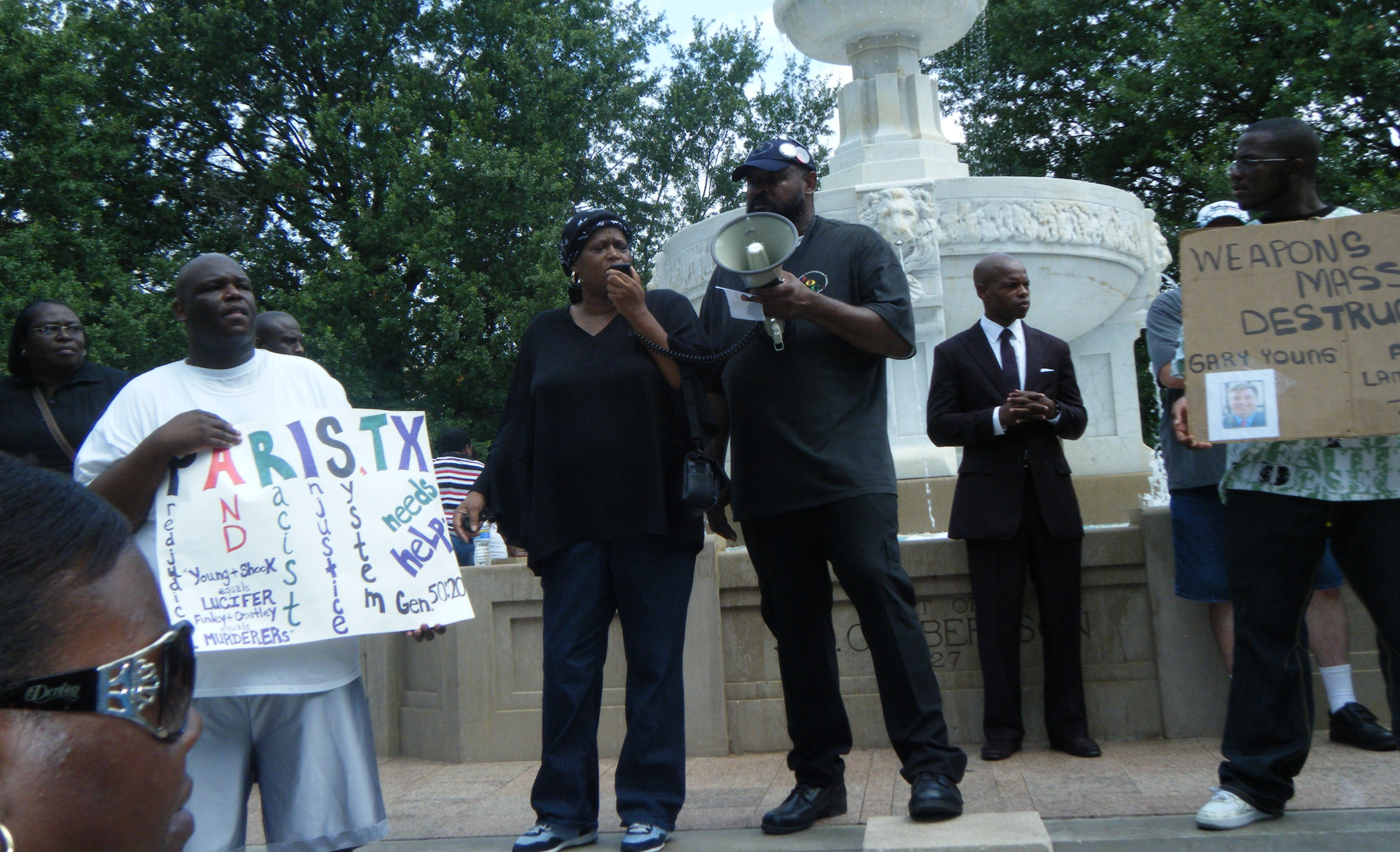
Local resident and activist Brenda Cherry speaking at the rally for Brandon McClelland, 2009

In 2008, an African-American man, Brandon McClelland, was run over and dragged to death under a vehicle. Two White men were arrested, but the prosecutor cited lack of evidence and declined to press charges, and no serious subsequent attempt to find other perpetrators was made. This caused unrest in the Paris African-American community. Following this incident, an attempt by the United States Department of Justice Community Relations Service to initiate a dialogue between the races in the town ended in failure when African-American complaints were mostly met by silent glares from white community members.

A 2009 protest rally over the case led to Texas State Police intervention to prevent groups shouting "white power!" and "black power!" from coming to blows. In response to the incident, civil rights activist Brenda Cherry said "I think we are probably stuck in 1930 right about now".

In 2009, some African-American workers at the Turner Industries Group facility in the city claimed that hangman's nooses, Confederate flags, and racist graffiti were common occurrences due to a select group of employees on the site. At the same time, the United States Department of Education was conducting an investigation into allegations that African-American students in Paris's schools are disciplined more harshly than White students for similar offenses.

In 2015, the United States Equal Employment Opportunity Commission ruled after an investigation that African-American workers at the Sara Lee Corporation plant in Paris (closed in 2011) were deliberately exposed disproportionately to asbestos, black mold, and other toxins, and also were targets of racial slurs and racist graffiti.

Some Paris residents downplay the extent to which the town has a race-relations problem. Judge M. C. Superville commented, "I do not believe there is systematic racial discrimination in Lamar County. I do believe there is a misperception that that is going on".

== Geography ==
According to the U.S. Census Bureau, the city has a total area of 44.4 square miles (115 km^{2}), of which 1.7 square miles (4.4 km^{2}) (3.74%) are covered by water.

Paris is located in "Tornado Alley", an area largely centered in the middle of the United States in which tornadoes occur frequently because of weather patterns and geography. Paris is in USDA plant hardiness zone 8a for winter temperatures. This is cooler than its southern neighbor Dallas, and while similar to Atlanta, Georgia, it has warmer summertime temperatures. Summertime average highs reach 94 and 95 °F (34 and 35 °C) in July and August, with associated lows of 72 and 71 °F (22 and 22 °C). Winter temperatures drop to an average high of 51 °F (11 °C) and low of 30 °F (−1 °C) in January. The highest temperature on record was 115 °F (46 °C), set in August 1936, and the record low was −5 °F (−21 °C), set in 1930. Average precipitation is 47.82 in (1,215 mm). Snow is not unusual, but is by no means predictable, and years can pass with no snowfall at all.

On April 2, 1982, Paris was hit by an F4 tornado that destroyed more than 1,500 homes, and left 10 people dead, 170 injured, and 3,000 homeless. The damage toll from this tornado was estimated at US$50 million in 1982.

=== Climate ===
According to the Köppen Climate Classification, Paris has a humid subtropical climate, aCfa on climate maps. The hottest temperature recorded in Paris was 115 °F (46.1 °C) in August 1936, while the coldest temperature recorded was −5 °F (−20.6 °C) in January 1930 although unofficially it was −12 °F (−24.4 °C) in February 1899.

Climate data for Paris, Texas, 1991–2020 normals, extremes 1896–present
| Month | Jan | Feb | Mar | Apr | May | Jun | Jul | Aug | Sep | Oct | Nov | Dec | Year |
|---|---|---|---|---|---|---|---|---|---|---|---|---|---|
| Record high °F (°C) | 90 (32) | 90 (32) | 94 (34) | 96 (36) | 100 (38) | 108 (42) | 111 (44) | 115 (46) | 112 (44) | 99 (37) | 94 (34) | 87 (31) | 115 (46) |
| Mean maximum °F (°C) | 73.9 (23.3) | 77.8 (25.4) | 83.9 (28.8) | 87.5 (30.8) | 93.0 (33.9) | 98.1 (36.7) | 102.5 (39.2) | 103.5 (39.7) | 99.2 (37.3) | 91.8 (33.2) | 82.3 (27.9) | 74.9 (23.8) | 104.7 (40.4) |
| Mean daily maximum °F (°C) | 53.5 (11.9) | 58.5 (14.7) | 66.5 (19.2) | 75.0 (23.9) | 82.7 (28.2) | 91.2 (32.9) | 95.8 (35.4) | 96.2 (35.7) | 88.7 (31.5) | 78.2 (25.7) | 65.2 (18.4) | 55.8 (13.2) | 75.6 (24.2) |
| Daily mean °F (°C) | 43.4 (6.3) | 47.8 (8.8) | 55.7 (13.2) | 63.9 (17.7) | 72.7 (22.6) | 81.1 (27.3) | 85.3 (29.6) | 85.1 (29.5) | 77.6 (25.3) | 66.4 (19.1) | 54.6 (12.6) | 45.8 (7.7) | 65.0 (18.3) |
| Mean daily minimum °F (°C) | 33.2 (0.7) | 37.0 (2.8) | 44.9 (7.2) | 52.8 (11.6) | 62.7 (17.1) | 71.0 (21.7) | 74.8 (23.8) | 74.1 (23.4) | 66.5 (19.2) | 54.7 (12.6) | 44.0 (6.7) | 35.8 (2.1) | 54.3 (12.4) |
| Mean minimum °F (°C) | 18.0 (−7.8) | 21.9 (−5.6) | 27.5 (−2.5) | 37.3 (2.9) | 47.4 (8.6) | 60.6 (15.9) | 66.5 (19.2) | 65.6 (18.7) | 52.4 (11.3) | 38.3 (3.5) | 28.1 (−2.2) | 21.6 (−5.8) | 14.4 (−9.8) |
| Record low °F (°C) | −5 (−21) | −4 (−20) | 7 (−14) | 25 (−4) | 30 (−1) | 46 (8) | 57 (14) | 53 (12) | 34 (1) | 19 (−7) | 15 (−9) | 0 (−18) | −5 (−21) |
| Average precipitation inches (mm) | 3.08 (78) | 3.34 (85) | 4.35 (110) | 4.71 (120) | 5.63 (143) | 4.26 (108) | 3.51 (89) | 2.95 (75) | 3.95 (100) | 4.62 (117) | 4.21 (107) | 4.28 (109) | 48.89 (1,241) |
| Average snowfall inches (cm) | 0.4 (1.0) | 0.1 (0.25) | trace | 0.0 (0.0) | 0.0 (0.0) | 0.0 (0.0) | 0.0 (0.0) | 0.0 (0.0) | 0.0 (0.0) | 0.0 (0.0) | trace | 0.4 (1.0) | 0.9 (2.25) |
| Average precipitation days (≥ 0.01 in) | 8.8 | 9.1 | 9.5 | 9.0 | 9.9 | 7.7 | 6.3 | 5.4 | 6.5 | 7.5 | 7.4 | 8.3 | 95.4 |
| Average snowy days (≥ 0.1 in) | 0.3 | 0.1 | 0.0 | 0.0 | 0.0 | 0.0 | 0.0 | 0.0 | 0.0 | 0.0 | 0.0 | 0.3 | 0.7 |
Source 1: NOAA (snow, snow days 1981–2010)
Source 2: National Weather Service

== Demographics ==
Historical population
| Census | Pop. | Note | %± |
|---|---|---|---|
| 1880 | 3,980 | | — |
| 1890 | 8,254 | | 107.4% |
| 1900 | 9,358 | | 13.4% |
| 1910 | 11,269 | | 20.4% |
| 1920 | 15,040 | | 33.5% |
| 1930 | 15,649 | | 4.0% |
| 1940 | 18,678 | | 19.4% |
| 1950 | 21,643 | | 15.9% |
| 1960 | 20,977 | | −3.1% |
| 1970 | 23,441 | | 11.7% |
| 1980 | 25,498 | | 8.8% |
| 1990 | 24,799 | | −2.7% |
| 2000 | 25,898 | | 4.4% |
| 2010 | 25,171 | | −2.8% |
| 2020 | 24,476 | | −2.8% |
Texas Almanac

From an 1880 United States census population of 3,980, the population of the city of Paris increased to 25,898 at the 2000 census;. However, by 2020 the population had declined to 24,171.

=== 2020 census ===
As of the 2020 census, Paris had a population of 24,476 and a median age of 38.7 years. Twenty-three point seven percent of residents were under the age of 18, and 19.5% were 65 years of age or older. For every 100 females there were 87.4 males, and for every 100 females age 18 and over there were 83.5 males age 18 and over.

95.0% of residents lived in urban areas, while 5.0% lived in rural areas.

As of the 2020 census, there were 10,185 households in Paris, of which 28.8% had children under the age of 18 living in them. Of all households, 34.3% were married-couple households, 20.0% were households with a male householder and no spouse or partner present, and 39.2% were households with a female householder and no spouse or partner present. About 35.1% of all households were made up of individuals and 16.5% had someone living alone who was 65 years of age or older.

As of the 2020 census, there were 11,569 housing units, of which 12.0% were vacant. The homeowner vacancy rate was 2.2% and the rental vacancy rate was 10.1%.

Racial composition as of the 2020 census
| Race | Number | Percent |
|---|---|---|
| White | 14,515 | 59.3% |
| Black or African American | 5,701 | 23.3% |
| American Indian and Alaska Native | 396 | 1.6% |
| Asian | 353 | 1.4% |
| Native Hawaiian and Other Pacific Islander | 26 | 0.1% |
| Some other race | 1,406 | 5.7% |
| Two or more races | 2,079 | 8.5% |
| Hispanic or Latino (of any race) | 2,908 | 11.9% |

=== 2010 census ===
In 2010, 25,171 people, 10,306 households, and 6,426 families resided in the city. The population density was 588.1 people per square mile (227.1 people/km^{2}). The 11,883 housing units averaged 277.6 per square mile (107.2/km^{2}). The average household size was 2.38 and the average family size was 3.01. In the city, the population was distributed as 25.0% under 18, 10.6% from 18 to 24, 24.1% from 25 to 44, 23.8% from 45 to 64, and 16.6% who were 65 or older. The median age was 37.1 years. For every 100 females, there were 87.3 males. For every 100 females 18 and over, there were 82.9 males.

=== 2020 American Community Survey ===
The 2020 American Community Survey estimated that 933 residents were foreign-born, 18.9% of whom were naturalized U.S. citizens. It also estimated that 49.6% of housing units were owner-occupied while 50.4% were renter-occupied.

== Economy ==
In the past, Paris was a major cotton exchange, and the county was developed as cotton plantations. While cotton is still farmed on the lands around Paris, it is no longer a major part of the economy.

Paris's one major hospital had two campuses: Paris Regional Medical Center South (formerly St. Joseph's Hospital) and Paris Regional Medical Center North (formerly McCuistion Regional Medical Center). It serves as the center of healthcare for much of Northeast Texas and Southeast Oklahoma. Both campuses were operated jointly under the name of the Paris Regional Medical Center, a division of Essent Healthcare. Paris Regional Medical Center South Campus has closed and only the North Campus remains open. The health network is one of the largest employers in the Paris area.

Outside of healthcare, the largest employers are Kimberly-Clark and Campbell Soup.

| # | Employer | Number of employees |
|---|---|---|
| 1 | Essent-PRMC | 1000 |
| 2 | Campbell Soup | 900 |
| 3 | Kimberly-Clark | 800 |
| 4 | Turner Industries | 700 |
| 5 | Paris Independent School District | 640 |
| T-6 | North Lamar Independent School District | 500 |
| T-6 | Walmart | 500 |
| 8 | TCIM | 480 |
| 9 | City of Paris | 320 |
| 10 | We-Pack Logistics | 300 |

Note: PRMC is Paris Regional Medical Center.

== Arts and culture ==
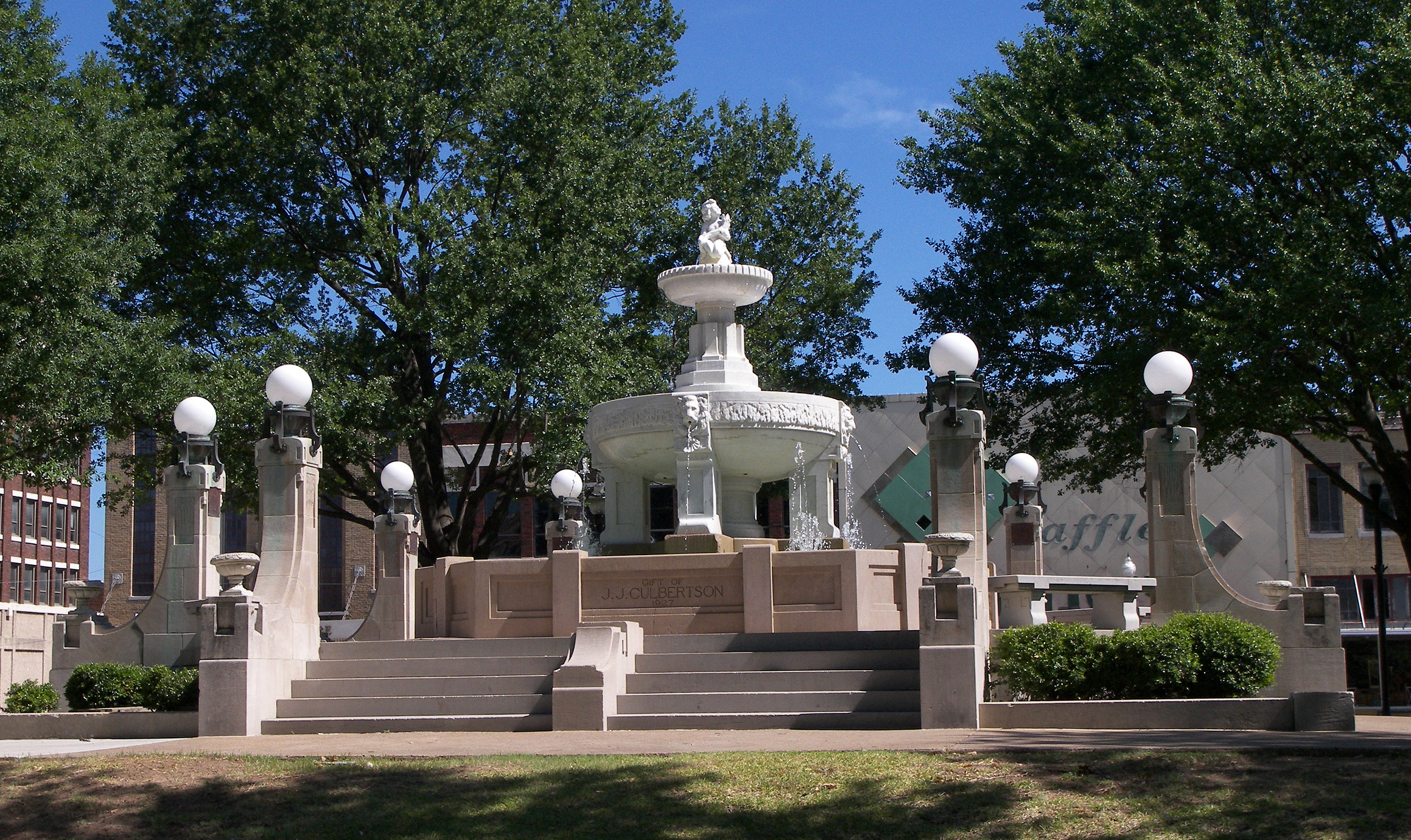
The Culbertson Fountain

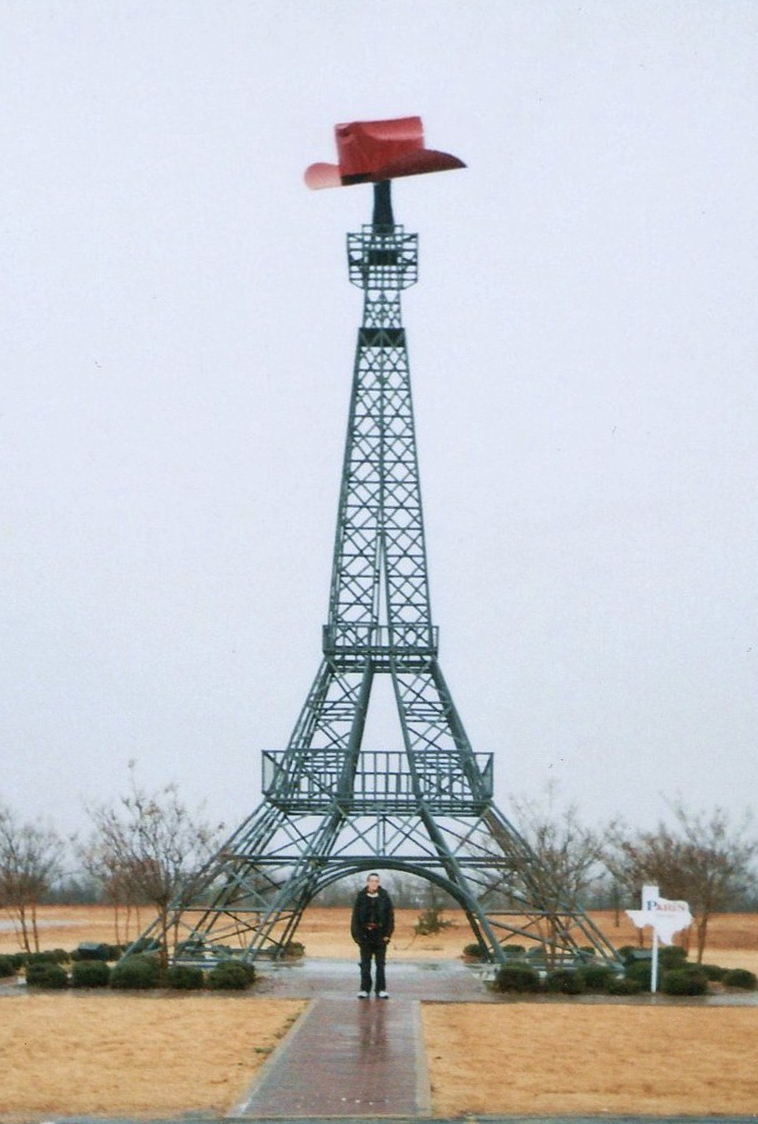
The 65-foot (20 m) tall Paris Eiffel Tower with the red cowboy hat at its apex

The city is home to several late-19th to mid-20th-century stately homes. Among these is the Rufus Fenner Scott Mansion, designed by German architect J.L. Wees and constructed in 1910. The structure is solid concrete and steel with four floors. Rufus Scott was a prominent businessman known for shipping, imports, and banking. He was well known by local farmers, who bought aging transport mules from him. The Scott Mansion narrowly survived the fire of 1916. After the fire, Scott brought the architect Wees back to Paris to redesign the historic downtown area.

- Pat Mayse Lake
- Beaver's Bend Resort Park (Oklahoma)
- Evergreen Cemetery – Located on the south side of town, over 50,000 people are interred there. This is the site of a noted 12-foot (3.7 m) tall "Jesus with cowboy boots" statue and grave marker of Willet Babcock, as well as the resting place of banker/philanthropist William J. McDonald, Confederate General/U.S. Senator Sam Bell Maxey, rancher Pitts Chisum, and cotton magnate John J. Culbertson. Pitts Chisum's more famous brother, John Chisum, is also buried in the city.
- Sam Bell Maxey House – Maxey was a Confederate general and two-time US senator.
- Paris Eiffel Tower
- On October 4, 1955, early in his career, Elvis Presley performed at the Boys Club Gymnasium at 1530 1st Street Northeast in Paris as a member of the Louisiana Hayride Jamboree tour.
- Lamar County Historical Museum
- Lake Crook Park

== Government ==
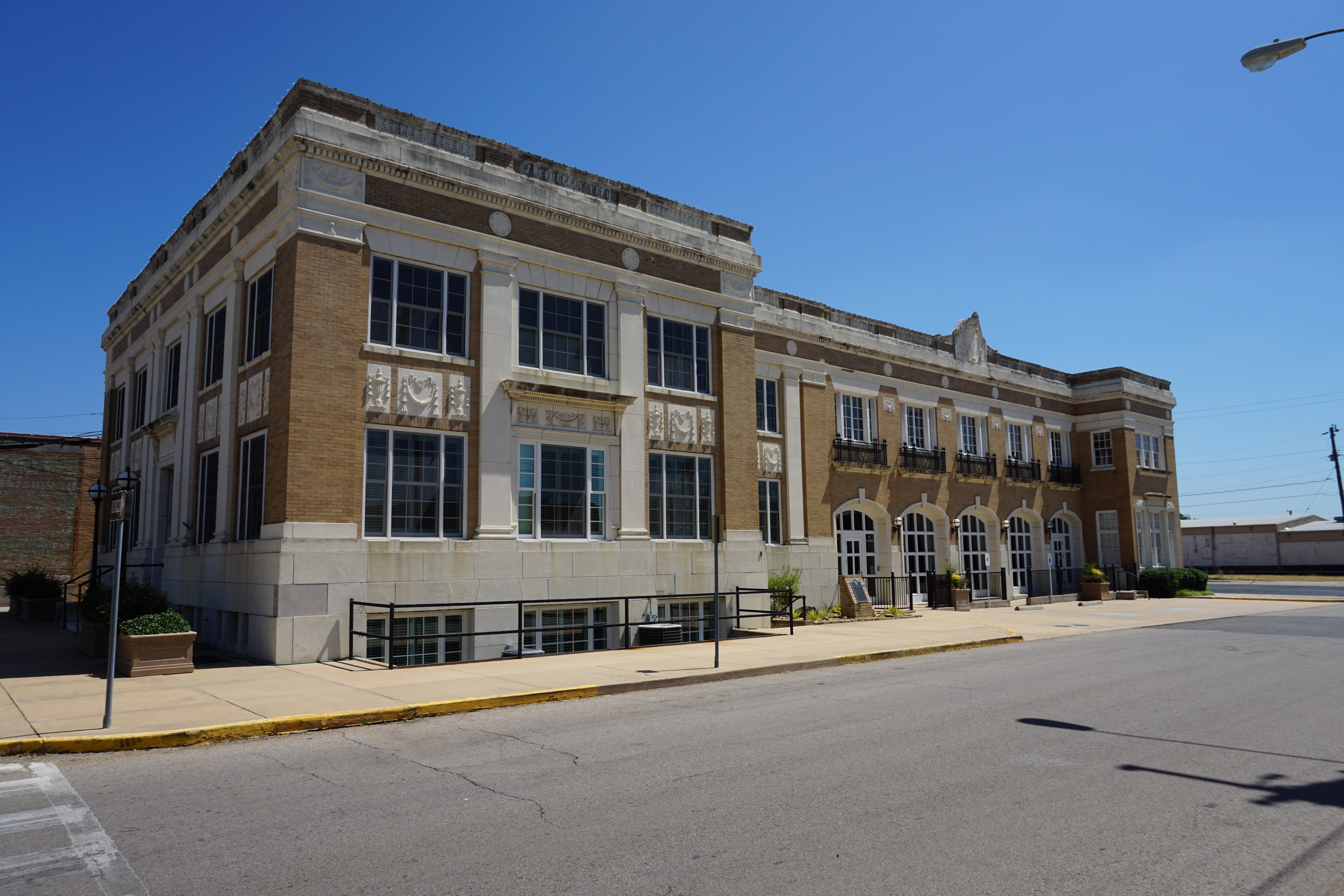
City Hall in July 2015

Paris is governed by a city council as specified in the city's charter adopted in 1948.

Paris is represented in the Texas Senate by Republican Bryan Hughes, District 1, and in the Texas House of Representatives by Republican Gary VanDeaver, District 1.

The Texas Department of Criminal Justice operates the Paris District Parole Office

At the federal level, the two U.S. senators from Texas are Republicans John Cornyn and Ted Cruz. Paris is part of Texas's 4th congressional district, represented by Republican Pat Fallon.

The United States Postal Service operates the Paris Post Office.

== Education ==
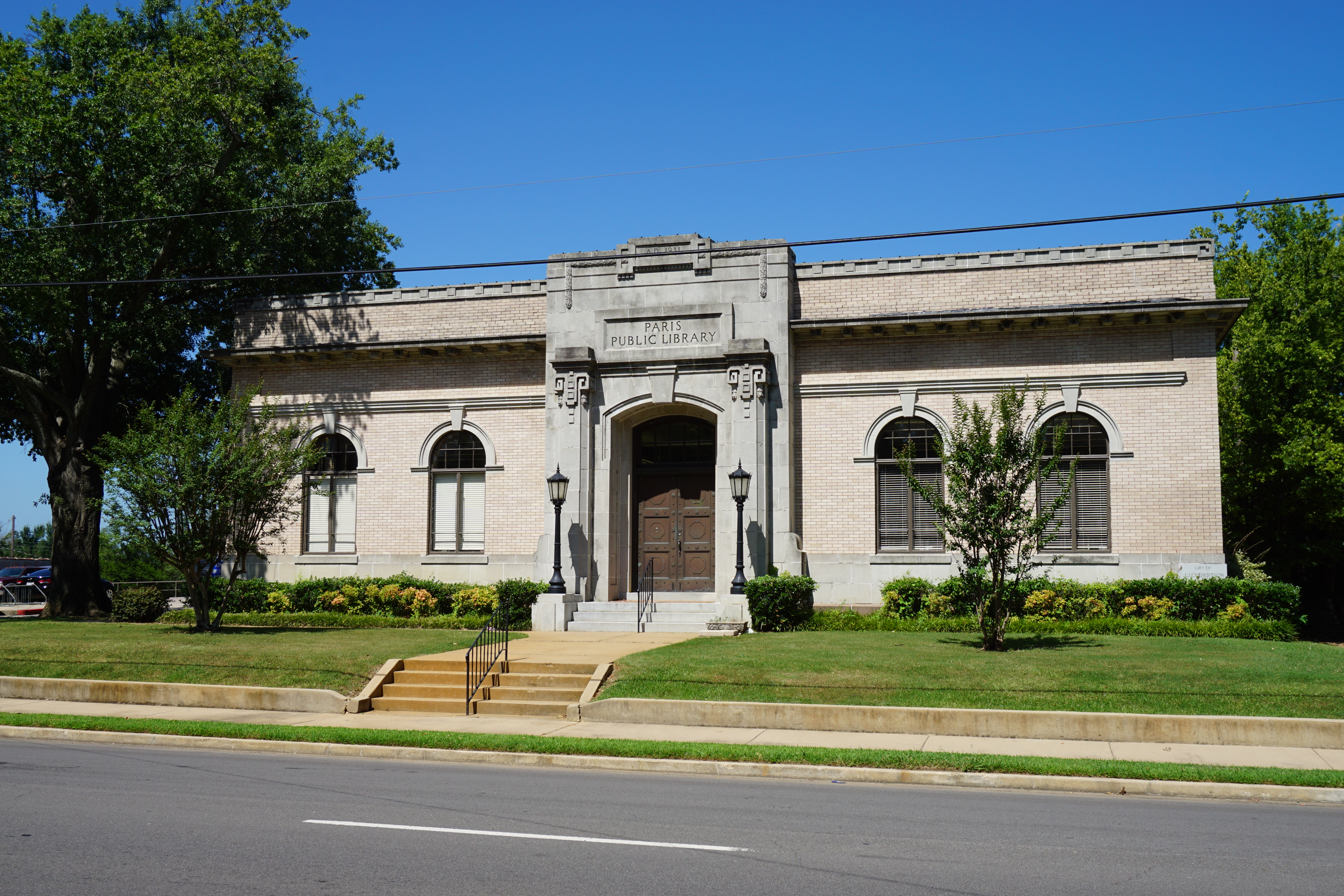
Paris Public Library in July 2015

Elementary and secondary education is split among these school districts:

- Paris Independent School District
- North Lamar Independent School District
- Chisum Independent School District

In addition, Paris Junior College provides post-secondary education. The Texas Education Code specifies that all of the Paris city limits is in the community college's service area. The TEC additionally specifies that areas in Paris ISD and all of Lamar County are in the college's service area. It hosts the Texas Institute of Jewelry Technology, which teaches subjects like gemology, horology, and jewelry. The Industrial Technology Division offers programs in air conditioning technology, refrigeration technology, agricultural technology, drafting and computer-aided design, electronics, electromechanical technology, and welding technology.

East Texas A&M University, a major university of over 12,000 students, is located in the neighboring city of Commerce, 40 miles (64 km) southwest of Paris.

The Paris Public Library serves Paris, as does the Lamar County Genealogical Society Library.

== Infrastructure ==
=== Transportation ===
==== Highways ====
Paris is served by four major highways:

- U.S. Highway 82
- U.S. Highway 271
- State Highway 19/State Highway 24
- State Highway Loop 286

According to the Texas Transportation Commission, Paris is the second-largest city in Texas without a four-lane divided highway connecting to an interstate highway within the state. However, those traveling north of the city can go into the Midwest on a four-lane thoroughfare via US 271 across the Red River into Oklahoma, and then the Indian Nation Turnpike from Hugo to Interstate 40 at Henryetta, which in turn continues as a free four-lane highway via US 75 to Tulsa.

==== Mass transit ====
For public transit, Paris is served by the Ark-Tex Council of Governments Rural Transit District (TRAX). Local, fixed-route bus service runs hourly on weekdays between 6:30 am and 6:30 pm. Dubbed the "Paris Metro", Texas Monthly has cited the town as a model for rural transport. There is no intercity transit available in Paris. However, intercity bus routes can be accessed in nearby Mount Pleasant and Sulphur Springs. These services are operated by Greyhound and Trailways.

==== Rail ====
Paris is served by a branch line of the Kiamichi Railroad leading to Hugo, Oklahoma, and is the eastern terminus of a Dallas, Garland and Northeastern Railroad line to Sherman, Texas. As of 2024, the rail lines are used for freight haulage only; the city is not served by Amtrak.

==== Air ====
Cox Field provides general aviation services, and is categorized by the Federal Aviation Administration as a Regional airport.

==== Trails ====
Paris is located on the Northeast Texas Trail (NETT), a 130 mi (210 km) hike-and-bike trail from Farmersville, Texas, to New Boston, Texas, which follows a disused railroad right-of-way railbanked by the Union Pacific Railroad and Chaparral Railroad in the 1990s.

== Notable people ==
- Duane Allen, member of the Oak Ridge Boys
- Tia Ballard, actress for Funimation Entertainment
- Charles Baxter, physician, attended President Kennedy after he was fatally shot
- Elle Evans Bellamy, model and actress
- Raymond Berry, professional football Hall of Famer
- Tyler Bryant, blues rock guitarist
- Brenda Cherry, civil rights activist
- John Chisum, cattle baron
- Gary B.B. Coleman, soul blues guitarist, singer, songwriter and record producer
- Marsha Farney, Republican member of the Texas House of Representatives; reared in Paris
- Bobby Jack Floyd, National Football League (NFL) fullback
- Charles R. Floyd, Democratic state senator; pioneer of the Texas farm-to-market road system
- Cas Haley, singer/musician, NBC's season two of America's Got Talent runner-up
- Al Haynes, commercial airline pilot, captain during the United Airlines Flight 232 crash
- William Henry Huddle, Texas Capitol artist
- Charlie Jackson, NFL football player
- Frank Jackson, NFL football player
- Frank James, outlaw and brother of Jesse James
- General John P. Jumper, Chief of Staff of the United States Air Force from 2001 to 2005
- Richard Gordon Kendall (1933–2008) self-taught outsider folk artist
- Beverly Leech, actress, portrayed Kate Monday on Mathnet
- Samuel Bell Maxey, United States Senator and Confederate Major General
- Gordon McLendon, pioneer radio broadcaster and founder of the Liberty Broadcasting System
- Jay Hunter Morris, operatic tenor
- John Morris, actor
- Robert Nelson (1920–1985), NFL professional football player
- John Osteen, pastor
- Lyndon Pete Patterson, American politician
- Dave Philley, professional baseball player and holder of five MLB records
- Bass Reeves, the first black deputy U.S. marshal to serve west of the Mississippi River
- Shari Rhodes, film casting director and producer.
- Admiral James O. Richardson, United States Navy Fleet Commander 1940–1941
- Eddie Robinson, professional baseball player, four-time All-Star and Texas Rangers executive
- Augusta Rucker, medical doctor, zoologist, public health lecturer
- Jack Russell, professional baseball player
- Leslie Satcher, country music recording artist
- William Scott Scudder, Major League Baseball pitcher
- Gene Stallings, Former head coach at Alabama, Texas A&M and Arizona Cardinals (NFL)
- Steven H. Tallant, president of Texas A&M University-Kingsville
- Starke Taylor, mayor of Dallas and businessman
- Shangela Laquifa Wadley, comedian, reality television personality, and drag performer
- Reavis Z. Wortham, author

== In popular culture ==
- The 1984 film Paris, Texas is named for the city.
- The city serves as the setting for the 2025 film The Wrong Paris.
