= Lamar County, Texas =

County in Texas, United States

- County
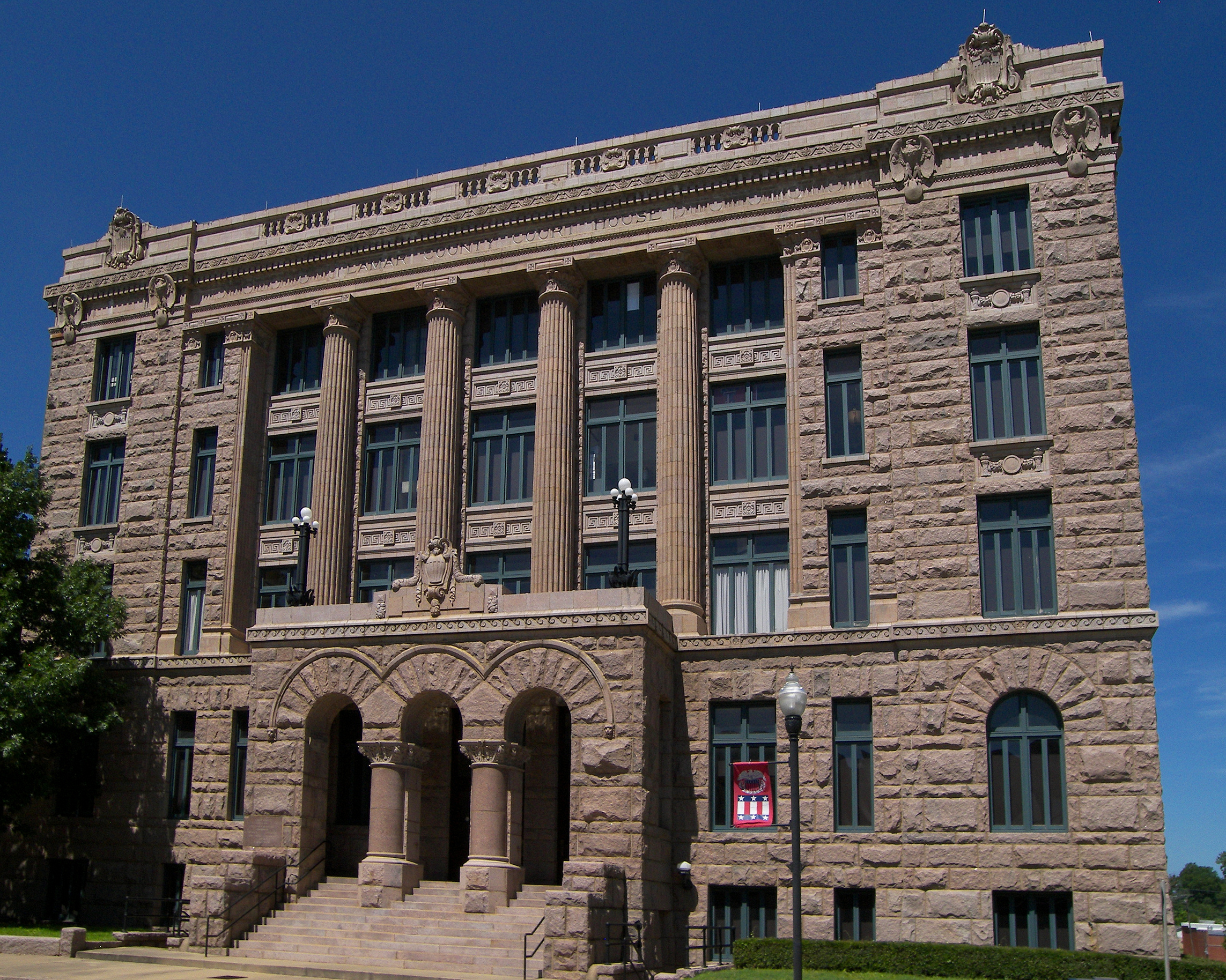
- The Lamar County Courthouse in Paris

- Location within the U.S. state of Texas
- Coordinates: 33°40′N 95°34′W
- Country: United States
- State: Texas
- Founded: 1841
- Named for: Mirabeau B. Lamar
- Seat: Paris
- Largest city: Paris

Area
  - Total: 933 sq mi (2,420 km^{2})
  - Land: 907 sq mi (2,350 km^{2})
  - Water: 26 sq mi (67 km^{2}) 2.8%

Population (2020)
  - Total: 50,088
  - Estimate (2025): 51,503 ▲
  - Density: 55.2/sq mi (21.3/km^{2})
- Time zone: UTC−6 (Central)
  - Summer (DST): UTC−5 (CDT)
- Congressional district: 4th
- Website: www.lamarcountytx.gov

Lamar County (/ləˈmɑːr/) is a county located in the U.S. state of Texas, in the Northeast Texas region. As of the 2020 census, its population was 50,088. Its county seat is Paris. The county was formed by the Congress of the Republic of Texas on December 17, 1840, and organized the next year. It is named for Mirabeau B. Lamar, the second president of the Republic of Texas. Lamar County comprises the Paris, TX micropolitan statistical area.

== Geography ==
According to the U.S. Census Bureau, the county has a total area of 933 square miles (2,420 km^{2}), of which 907 square miles (2,350 km^{2}) are land and 26 square miles (67 km^{2}) (2.8%) are covered by water.

=== Major highways ===
- U.S. Highway 82
- U.S. Highway 271
- State Highway 19
- State Highway 24
- Loop 286
- Spur 139

=== Adjacent counties ===
- Choctaw County, Oklahoma (north)
- Red River County (east)
- Delta County (south)
- Fannin County (west)
- Bryan County, Oklahoma (northwest)

== Communities ==
=== Cities ===
- Blossom
- Deport (partly in Red River County)
- Paris (county seat and largest municipality)
- Reno
- Roxton
- Sun Valley
- Toco

=== Census-designated place ===
- Brookston
- Petty
- Powderly

=== Unincorporated communities ===
- Ambia
- Arthur City
- Atlas
- Chicota
- Cunningham
- Glory
- Hopewell
- Midcity
- Milton
- Pattonville
- Sumner
- Broadway Junction

== Demographics ==
Historical population
Census	Pop.	Note	%±
1850	3,978		—
1860	10,136		154.8%
1870	15,790		55.8%
1880	27,193		72.2%
1890	37,302		37.2%
1900	48,627		30.4%
1910	46,544		−4.3%
1920	55,742		19.8%
1930	48,529		−12.9%
1940	50,425		3.9%
1950	43,033		−14.7%
1960	34,234		−20.4%
1970	36,062		5.3%
1980	42,156		16.9%
1990	43,949		4.3%
2000	48,499		10.4%
2010	49,793		2.7%
2020	50,088		0.6%
2025 (est.)	51,503	▲	2.8%
U.S. Decennial Census; 1850–2010 2010–2020

=== 2020 census ===
As of the 2020 census, the county had a population of 50,088. The median age was 40.8 years. 23.3% of residents were under the age of 18 and 20.0% of residents were 65 years of age or older. For every 100 females there were 92.7 males, and for every 100 females age 18 and over there were 90.4 males age 18 and over.

The racial makeup of the county was 72.8% White, 12.9% Black or African American, 1.7% American Indian and Alaska Native, 1.0% Asian, 0.1% Native Hawaiian and Pacific Islander, 3.8% from some other race, and 7.7% from two or more races. Hispanic or Latino residents of any race comprised 8.8% of the population.

52.5% of residents lived in urban areas, while 47.5% lived in rural areas.

There were 20,186 households in the county, of which 29.9% had children under the age of 18 living in them. Of all households, 46.9% were married-couple households, 17.9% were households with a male householder and no spouse or partner present, and 29.6% were households with a female householder and no spouse or partner present. About 28.4% of all households were made up of individuals and 13.7% had someone living alone who was 65 years of age or older.

There were 22,644 housing units, of which 10.9% were vacant. Among occupied housing units, 63.9% were owner-occupied and 36.1% were renter-occupied. The homeowner vacancy rate was 1.8% and the rental vacancy rate was 9.4%.

=== Racial and ethnic composition ===
Lamar County, Texas – Racial and ethnic composition Note: the US Census treats Hispanic/Latino as an ethnic category. This table excludes Latinos from the racial categories and assigns them to a separate category. Hispanics/Latinos may be of any race.
Race / Ethnicity (NH = Non-Hispanic)	Pop 1980	Pop 1990	Pop 2000	Pop 2010	Pop 2020	% 1980	% 1990	% 2000	% 2010	% 2020
White alone (NH)	35,171	36,546	39,116	37,891	35,354	83.43%	83.16%	80.65%	76.10%	70.58%
Black or African American alone (NH)	6,226	6,369	6,493	6,628	6,378	14.77%	14.49%	13.39%	13.31%	12.73%
Native American or Alaska Native alone (NH)	215	403	478	592	751	0.51%	0.92%	0.99%	1.19%	1.50%
Asian alone (NH)	93	147	191	304	474	0.22%	0.33%	0.39%	0.61%	0.95%
Native Hawaiian or Pacific Islander alone (NH)	x	x	11	5	25	x	x	0.02%	0.01%	0.05%
Other race alone (NH)	72	9	23	27	119	0.17%	0.02%	0.05%	0.05%	0.24%
Mixed race or Multiracial (NH)	x	x	573	1,123	2,575	x	x	1.18%	2.26%	5.14%
Hispanic or Latino (any race)	379	475	1,614	3,223	4,412	0.90%	1.08%	3.33%	6.47%	8.81%
Total	42,156	43,949	48,499	49,793	50,088	100.00%	100.00%	100.00%	100.00%	100.00%

=== 2000 census ===
As of the census of 2000, 48,499 people, 19,077 households, and 13,468 families resided in the county. At the tabulation of the 2020 census, its population increased to 50,088.

In 2000, the racial makeup of the county was 82.46% White, 13.47% Black or African American, 1.08% Native American, 0.40% Asian, 1.19% from other races, and 1.41% from two or more races. About 3.33% of the population was Hispanic or Latino of any race.

From 2000 to 2020, the majority of its population remained predominantly non-Hispanic white even as nationwide demographics continued to diversify.

== Education ==
These school districts serve Lamar County:

- Chisum ISD (small portion in Delta County)
- Fannindel ISD (mostly in Delta and Fannin Counties; small portion in Hunt County)
- Honey Grove ISD (mostly in Fannin County)
- North Lamar ISD
- Paris ISD
- Prairiland ISD (small portion in Red River County)

Until it closed in 2019, Roxton ISD included a part of the county. Roxton ISD consolidated into Chisum ISD after the 2018–19 school year.

In addition, Paris Junior College serves the county, as per the Texas Education Code.

== Politics ==
The majority-white population supported the Democratic Party well into the late 20th century, when it was nearly a one-party state, but in the early 21st century, most have shifted to the Republican Party. Lamar County is now represented in the Texas House of Representatives by Gary VanDeaver of New Boston.

Lamar County is located within District 1 of the Texas House of Representatives. Lamar County is located within District 1 of the Texas Senate.

United States presidential election results for Lamar County, Texas
Year	Republican		Democratic		Third party(ies)	
Year	No.	%	No.	%	No.	%
1912	206	7.47%	2,286	82.89%	266	9.64%
1916	309	8.08%	3,412	89.23%	103	2.69%
1920	639	12.76%	3,765	75.21%	602	12.03%
1924	596	9.97%	5,224	87.37%	159	2.66%
1928	2,887	57.08%	2,163	42.76%	8	0.16%
1932	375	5.95%	5,911	93.72%	21	0.33%
1936	308	5.19%	5,621	94.65%	10	0.17%
1940	761	8.64%	8,038	91.29%	6	0.07%
1944	725	9.36%	6,283	81.10%	739	9.54%
1948	1,018	12.17%	6,306	75.39%	1,041	12.44%
1952	3,929	41.56%	5,524	58.44%	0	0.00%
1956	4,154	49.56%	4,202	50.14%	25	0.30%
1960	3,964	43.68%	5,084	56.02%	28	0.31%
1964	2,594	29.13%	6,303	70.78%	8	0.09%
1968	3,395	31.05%	4,635	42.39%	2,903	26.55%
1972	7,736	72.62%	2,865	26.90%	51	0.48%
1976	4,443	33.98%	8,601	65.78%	32	0.24%
1980	6,094	45.17%	7,178	53.21%	218	1.62%
1984	9,273	62.57%	5,504	37.14%	43	0.29%
1988	8,021	51.42%	7,553	48.42%	24	0.15%
1992	5,778	35.57%	6,328	38.96%	4,137	25.47%
1996	6,393	46.59%	6,075	44.27%	1,254	9.14%
2000	9,775	63.35%	5,553	35.99%	102	0.66%
2004	12,054	69.00%	5,338	30.56%	78	0.45%
2008	12,952	70.54%	5,243	28.55%	167	0.91%
2012	12,826	74.58%	4,181	24.31%	190	1.10%
2016	14,561	77.81%	3,583	19.15%	570	3.05%
2020	16,760	78.16%	4,458	20.79%	224	1.04%
2024	17,044	80.08%	4,079	19.16%	162	0.76%

United States Senate election results for Lamar County, Texas1
Year	Republican		Democratic		Third party(ies)	
Year	No.	%	No.	%	No.	%
2024	16,454	77.96%	4,344	20.58%	308	1.46%

United States Senate election results for Lamar County, Texas2
Year	Republican		Democratic		Third party(ies)	
Year	No.	%	No.	%	No.	%
2020	16,476	77.88%	4,295	20.30%	384	1.82%

Texas Gubernatorial election results for Lamar County
Year	Republican		Democratic		Third party(ies)	
Year	No.	%	No.	%	No.	%
2022	12,521	81.61%	2,657	17.32%	164	1.07%

== See also ==
- National Register of Historic Places listings in Lamar County, Texas
- Recorded Texas Historic Landmarks in Lamar County
- Lamar County Historical Museum
