= Cash, Texas =

- Unincorporated community
- Location within Texas Location within the United States
- Coordinates: 32°59′40″N 96°06′29″W
- Country: United States
- State: Texas
- County: Hunt
- Elevation: 502 ft (153 m)
- Time zone: UTC-6 (Central (CST))
  - Summer (DST): UTC-5 (CDT)
- GNIS feature ID: 1332285

Cash is an unincorporated community in south-central Hunt County, Texas, United States. It lies about 5 miles south of Greenville along State Highway 34.

The community was established in the mid-1890s by Edward H.R. Green, president of the Texas Midland Railroad. Originally called Sylvia, the area developed into a farming center. An attempt by residents to change the settlement's name from Sylvia to Money, after local store owner John A. Money, was rejected by postal authorities and the name Cash was substituted. A post office branch opened in 1895 with Money as postmaster.

As of 2000, about 56 residents lived in Cash. The community has a small volunteer fire department. An attempt to incorporate Cash as a city proved unsuccessful. Of the 79 ballots cast in the November 3, 2009, election, 62 (78.48%) voted against incorporation with 17 (21.52%) in favor. A separate vote was held to select three members to serve as commissioners had the incorporation measure been approved. The three candidates – Jeremy Williams, Jason B. Monroe, and Cody Baise – received 17, 13, and 11 votes, respectively. These results were voided since the incorporation vote failed.

Despite its rural location and distance from major cities, Cash and Hunt County are considered part of the Dallas–Fort Worth–Arlington metropolitan statistical area.

== Education ==
The Cash area is served by three independent school districts: Boles, Greenville, and Quinlan.
