= Celeste High School =

Location
- 609 FM 1562; Celeste, Texas 75423-0067; United States; 33.2900°N 96.2022°W

Information
- School type: Public high school
- School district: Celeste Independent School District
- Principal: Jimmy Branam
- Teaching staff: 18.58 (FTE)
- Grades: 9-12
- Enrollment: 157 (2023–2024)
- Student to teacher ratio: 8.45
- Colors: Royal Blue & White
- Athletics conference: UIL Class AA
- Mascot: Blue Devil
- Website: www.celesteisd.org/167110_2

Celeste High School is a public high school located in the city of Celeste, Texas, United States and classified as a 2A school by the UIL. It is a part of the Celeste Independent School District located in northwestern Hunt County. In 2015, the school was rated Met Standard by the Texas Education Agency.

== Athletics ==
The Celeste Blue Devils compete in these sports -

Cross Country, Football, Basketball, Powerlifting, Golf, Tennis, Track, Baseball & Softball

=== State titles ===
- Girls Basketball
  - 1992(1A), 1993(1A)

== Notable alumni ==
- Shalonda Enis - (born October 3, 1974) is a former professional basketball player who played for the Washington Mystics and Charlotte Sting of the WNBA.
- Jamaica Rector - (born August 10, 1981) is a former NFL player
