= Jacobia, Texas =

Unincorporated community in Texas, US

Coordinates: 33°13′12″N 96°03′16″W

Jacobia is an unincorporated community of approximately 60 inhabitants in Hunt County, Texas, United States, located between the cities of Greenville and Wolfe City.
