= Dixon, Texas =

Dixon
- Unincorporated community
- Interactive map of Dixon
- Location within Texas Dixon (the United States)
- Coordinates: 33°4′9″N 96°1′37″W
- Country: United States
- State: Texas
- County: Hunt County

Dixon is an unincorporated community located along U.S Highway 69 in Hunt County, Texas, United States.

== History ==
The community began in 1880 and a post office for the community was built in 1881 which closed in 1924. By 1885, it became a shipping point for the Missouri, Kansas and Texas Railroad. The settlement had a population of 180 as well as a school and two churches by 1890. Its population fell to 84 by 1933 with only two businesses and then to 50 by 1952, and by 1976 to 2000, its population remained stable at 31. Dixon features a historic cemetery known as the Allen Cemetery.
