= Jamaica Rector =

American football player (born 1981)

No. 85, 10
- Position: Wide receiver

Personal information
- Born: August 10, 1981 (age 45); Celeste, Texas, U.S.
- Listed height: 5 ft 10 in (1.78 m)
- Listed weight: 187 lb (85 kg)

Career information
- High school: Celeste
- College: Northwest Missouri State
- NFL draft: 2005: undrafted

Career history
- Dallas Cowboys (2005–2006); Arizona Cardinals (2007); Edmonton Eskimos (2008–2010)

Awards and highlights
- 4× All-MIAA (2001–2004); Little All-American (2004)

Career NFL statistics
- Games played: 3
- Return yards: 22
- Stats at Pro Football Reference

Career CFL statistics
- Games played: 24
- Receptions: 66
- Receiving yards: 736
- Receiving touchdowns: 1

Jamaica Rector (born August 10, 1981) is an American former professional football player who was a wide receiver in the National Football League (NFL) for the Dallas Cowboys and Arizona Cardinals. He also was a member of the Edmonton Eskimos in the Canadian Football League (CFL). He played college football for the Northwest Missouri State Bearcats.

== Early life ==
Rector attended Celeste High School. He was a two-way All-state player both his junior and senior year. He was named Texas Class 1A Defensive Player of the Year as a senior. He also practiced track, basketball, baseball and tennis.

He accepted a football scholarship from Division II Northwest Missouri State University. As a freshman he was named a starter at wide receiver, registering 61 receptions for 1,081 yards, 9 touchdowns, 11 kickoff returns for a 27.5-yard avg. and 18 punt returns for a 10.0-yard avg.

As a sophomore, he recorded 78 receptions for 1,242 yards and 6 touchdowns. As a junior, he tallied 63 passes for 971 yards, 8 touchdowns, a 32.7-yard kickoff return average and 20 punt returns for 316 yards.

As a senior, he collected 87 receptions for 1,203 yards, 15 touchdowns, 15 kickoff returns for a 24.0-yard average and 29 punt returns for a 16.6-yard avg.

Rector left as the school's and conference's All-time most productive wide receiver, with 289 receptions (third in NCAA Division II history) and 4,497 receiving yards (second in NCAA Division II history). He also set school records for touchdown receptions (38), punt returns (112), return yardage (1,404), kick return average (27.5)

In 2011, he was inducted into the Northwest Missouri State Hall of Fame.

== Professional career ==
=== Dallas Cowboys ===
Rector was signed as an undrafted free agent by the Dallas Cowboys after the 2005 NFL draft on April 28. On August 30, he was waived before the start of the season and was signed to the practice squad.

In the 2006 offseason, head coach Bill Parcells took a liking to him and even called him the strongest player on the team pound-for-pound. He made the roster after registering a team-high 20 receptions for 245 yards in four preseason games. Rector was named the team's primary punt returner and fourth receiver but suffered an ankle sprain in the season opener against the Jacksonville Jaguars. After being declared inactive for the next 4 games, he was released on October 16 and was signed to the practice squad, in order to make room for defensive back Marcus Coleman.

In 2007, a knee injury forced him to miss time in training camp and was eventually cut on August 27.

=== Arizona Cardinals ===
On October 10, 2007, the Arizona Cardinals signed him to their practice squad. He was promoted to the active roster on December 1. He was declared inactive for 3 games. He was cut on August 30, 2008.

=== Edmonton Eskimos ===
On October 20, 2008, he was signed by the Edmonton Eskimos of the Canadian Football League to their practice roster. In 2009, he appeared in 14 games, recording 48 receptions for 532 yards and one touchdown.

On June 25, 2010, he was released at the end of training camp. He was re-signed on July 13. He appeared in 10 games, making 18 receptions for 204 yards. He was cut on May 2, 2011. He finished his CFL career with 24 games, 66 receptions for 736 yards and one touchdown.

== Personal life ==
Rector married his wife, Cara in 2007 and has three children.
