= Celeste Independent School District =

School district in Hunt County, Texas

Address
- 207 S. 5th Street Celeste, Hunt County, Texas, 75423-9781; United States

District information
- Type: Independent school district
- Grades: K–12
- Superintendent: Brad Connelly
- Governing agency: Texas Education Agency
- Schools: Celeste High School; Celeste Junior High School; Celeste Elementary School
- NCES District ID: 4813260

Students and staff
- Enrollment: 489
- Teachers: 43.99 (on an FTE basis)
- Student–teacher ratio: 11.12
- Athletic conference: UIL Class AA
- District mascot: Blue Devil
- Colors: Royal Blue & White

Other information
- Website: www.celesteisd.org

Celeste Independent School District is a public school district based in Celeste, Texas located in northeast Hunt County in north East Texas.

In 2015, the school district was rated met standard by the Texas Education Agency.

The district operates three schools:

- Celeste High School (Grades 9-12)
- Celeste Junior High (Grades 6-8)
- Celeste Elementary School (Grades PK-5)
