= Merit, Texas =

- Unincorporated community
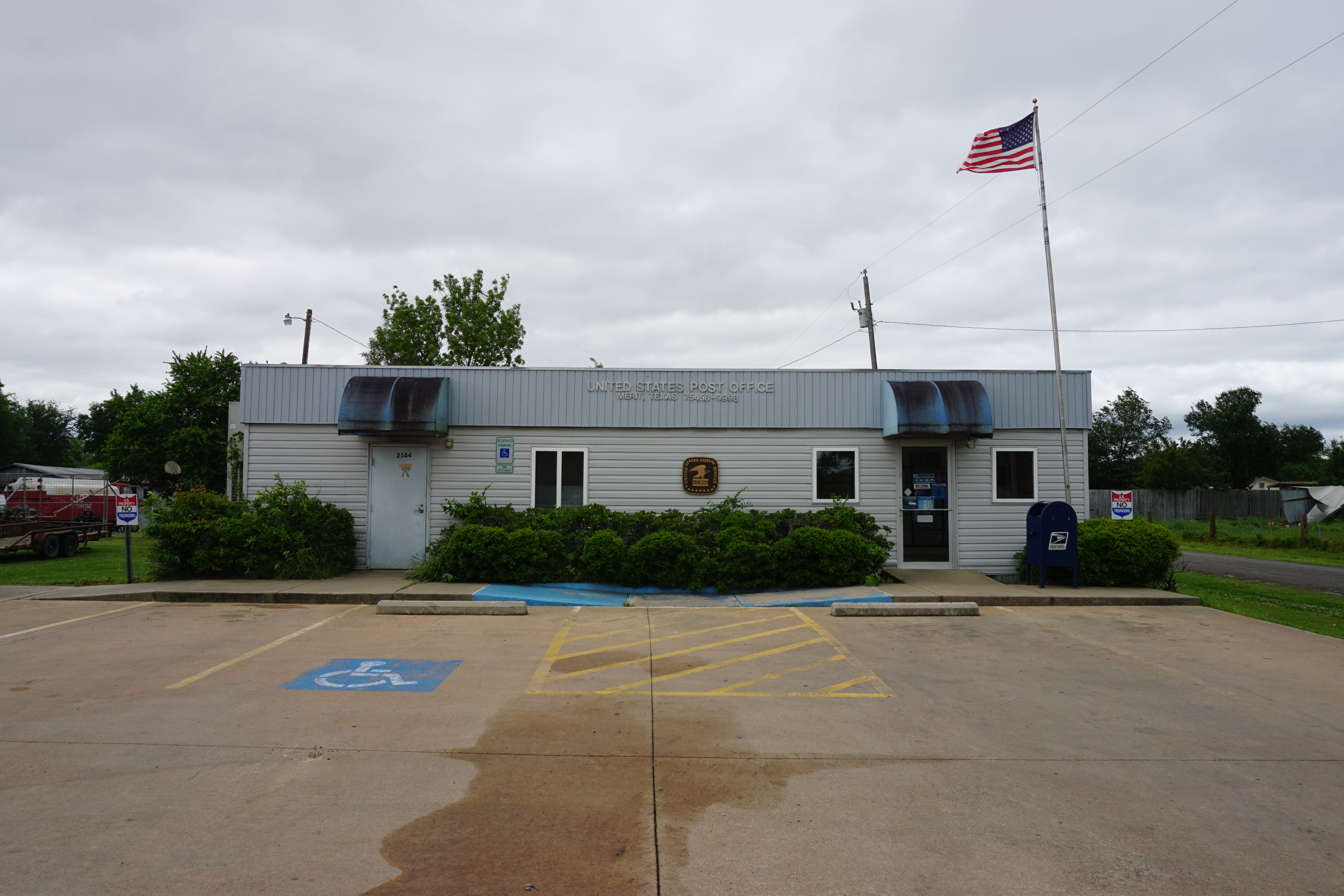
- United States Post Office in Merit

- Location within Texas Location within the United States
- Coordinates: 33°13′00″N 96°17′15″W
- Country: United States
- State: Texas
- County: Hunt
- Time zone: UTC-6 (Central (CST))
  - Summer (DST): UTC-5 (CDT)
- ZIP codes: 75458
- Area codes: 903, 430
- GNIS feature ID: 1341384

Merit is an unincorporated community in Hunt County, Texas, United States. It is 15 miles northwest of Greenville. Merit has a post office with the ZIP code 75458. The Bland Independent School District serves area students.

== History ==
Settlement of the site began sometime in the late 1860s or early 1870s through the efforts of Dr. Alexander Murchison, who arrived from Polk County, Georgia, who organized a Methodist church in April 1871. In the 1870s, Judge William Wallace Meritt's visit and speech impressed the residents so much that they named the town after him. The community received a post office in 1884. Two years later the tracks of the Gulf, Colorado, and Santa Fe Railway reached the settlement, which stimulated cotton production, helped stores, and began a newspaper. By the early 1890s the railroad had established Merit as a shipping point for area farmers. At that time the town had a steam cotton gin, a gristmill, some 20 other businesses, and 300 residents. By the eve of World War I the community's population had increased to 500, and the number of businesses to more than 25, including two banks.

In 1912, robbers stole $4,500 by blasting open the bank vault with nitroglycerin. A 1921 fire, the Great depression, and World War II led to a population drop which recent suburban growth has reversed. In 1945 the town had an estimated 300 residents and six businesses. Three years later the Merit and Floyd school districts were consolidated under the name Bland, after Fletcher B. Bland. The number of Merit residents declined to 185 in the early 1950s. During the 1970s its population began to grow again, and in 1988 through 2000 the town reported a population of 215.

== Climate ==
The area's climate is characterized by hot, humid summers and generally mild to cool winters. The Köppen climate classification system indicates Merit has a humid subtropical climate, Cfa on climate maps.

== Notable person ==
- Clint Lorance (born 1984), Army officer convicted of second-degree murder for battlefield deaths; pardoned by President Donald Trump
