= Quinlan, Texas =

- City
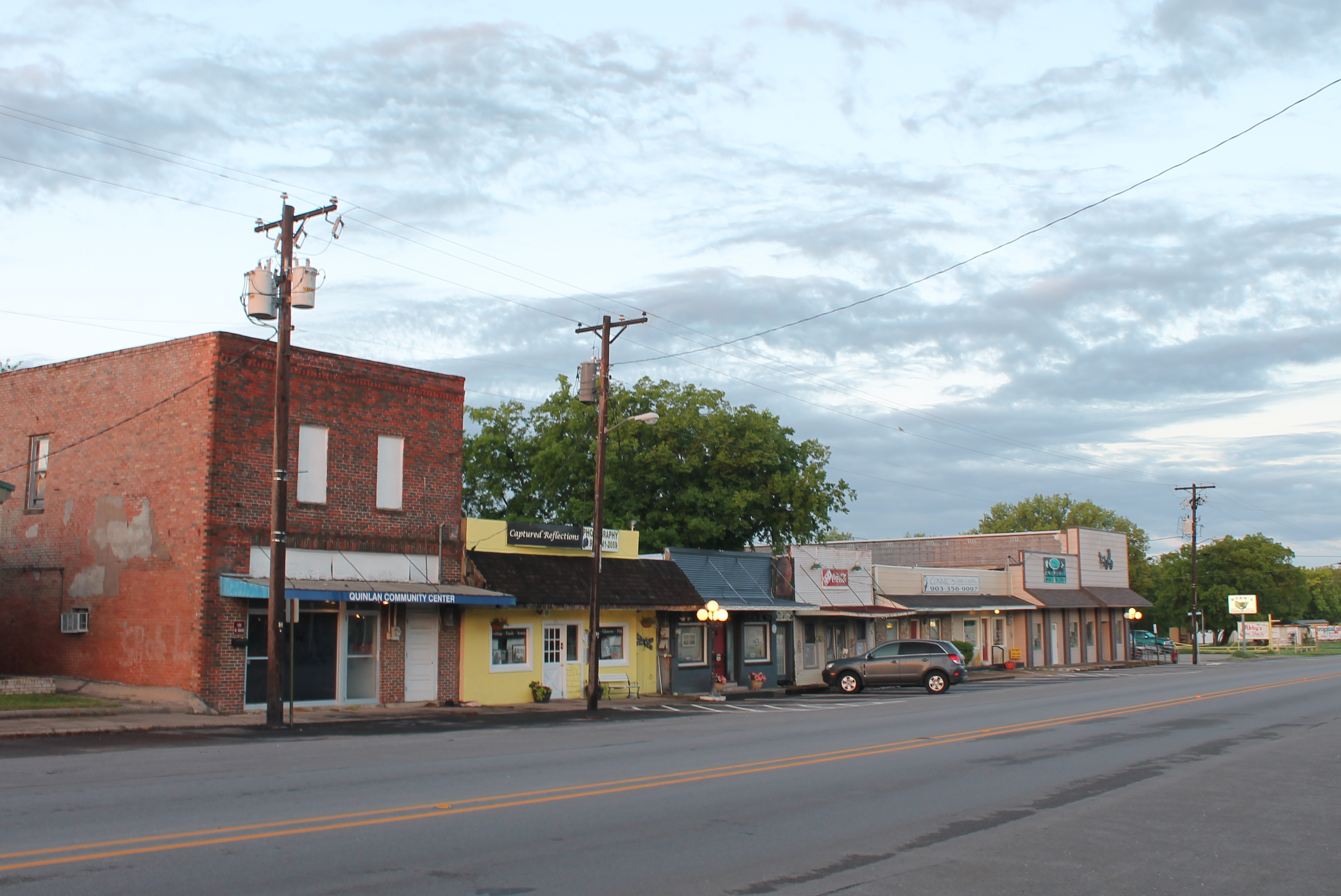
- Quinlan

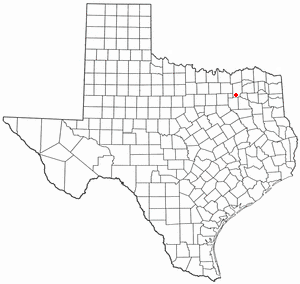
- Location of Quinlan, Texas

- Coordinates: 32°54′20″N 96°07′30″W
- Country: United States
- State: Texas
- County: Hunt

Area
  - Total: 1.29 sq mi (3.35 km^{2})
  - Land: 1.29 sq mi (3.35 km^{2})
  - Water: 0 sq mi (0.00 km^{2})
- Elevation: 522 ft (159 m)

Population (2020)
  - Total: 1,414
  - Density: 1,090/sq mi (422/km^{2})
- Time zone: UTC-6 (Central (CST))
  - Summer (DST): UTC-5 (CDT)
- ZIP code: 75474
- Area codes: 903, 430
- FIPS code: 48-60140
- GNIS feature ID: 2411508
- Website: www.cityofquinlan.net

Quinlan is a rural city in the southern part of Hunt County, Texas, United States. As of the 2020 census, it had a population of 1,414. It is 5 miles (8 km) west of Lake Tawakoni.

== History ==
The city of Quinlan began about 1892 as a stop on the Texas Midland Railroad, which was owned by famed bond investor Hetty Green, called by the contemporary press "The Witch of Wall Street". The railroad was operated by her son, Edward H.R. Green. Texas Midland became a subsidiary of the Houston & Texas Central Railroad, and the city which built up around a depot constructed here between the towns of Roberts and Greenville was named Quinlan in honor of George A. Quinlan, the general manager of the Houston & Texas Central railroad.

The post office opened in Quinlan in 1894, and by 1896, the city was incorporated. Harry Ford served as first mayor. Quinlan soon became the center of a large agricultural area, providing a railroad shipping point for growers of cotton and other crops. By the early 20th century, the town boasted three cotton gins, numerous businesses and fraternal organizations, banks, schools, churches, and homes.

Oil exploration and production overtook cotton farming as the area's economic base in the 1930s and 1940s, and the construction of Lake Tawakoni in the 1950s brought another economic boost to the community.

Some of the earliest settlers were John M. Cook and R. K. Epperson, who moved their businesses from Roberts. The settlement received a post office in 1894, and by 1900, its population had reached 362. This growth, no doubt induced by the presence of the railroad, continued through the first quarter of the 20th century. In 1904, 463 persons lived in Quinlan. The number rose to 537 by 1910 and 600 by 1914, when Quinlan had 20 businesses, including a bank and a weekly newspaper. In 1925, this "retail trade center for southern Hunt, northern Kaufman and Van Zandt Counties" had an elementary school, a high school, and 35 businesses, and managed a cotton harvest of some 5,000 bales. In 1933, Quinlan had 512 residents and 30 businesses; in 1952, the population of 599 supported 25 businesses; in 1964, the community had 621 persons and 22 businesses. After the mid-1960s, Quinlan grew considerably, largely due to its proximity to Lake Tawakoni. Quinlan had a population of 900 in 1976 and 1,002 in 1988, when it had 51 businesses. In 1990, its population was 1,360.

== Geography ==
Quinlan is in southern Hunt County. Texas State Highway 34 passes through the eastern side of the city, leading north 16 miles (26 km) to Greenville, the county seat, and southwest the same distance to Terrell. Highway 276 passes through Quinlan as its Main Street, leading east across Lake Tawakoni 22 miles (35 km) to Emory and west 20 miles (32 km) to Rockwall. Downtown Dallas is 42 miles (68 km) west of Quinlan.

According to the U.S. Census Bureau, Quinlan has an area of 1.3 square miles (3.4 km^{2}), all land.

=== Climate ===
Climate data for Quinlan, Texas
Month	Jan	Feb	Mar	Apr	May	Jun	Jul	Aug	Sep	Oct	Nov	Dec	Year
Mean daily maximum °F (°C)	56.7 (13.7)	60.1 (15.6)	68.7 (20.4)	78.0 (25.6)	83.5 (28.6)	90.6 (32.6)	95.7 (35.4)	95.7 (35.4)	87.5 (30.8)	79.9 (26.6)	68.4 (20.2)	58.9 (14.9)	77.0 (25.0)
Mean daily minimum °F (°C)	34.2 (1.2)	35.7 (2.1)	44.5 (6.9)	55.7 (13.2)	62.1 (16.7)	68.6 (20.3)	72.3 (22.4)	71.2 (21.8)	65.0 (18.3)	55.1 (12.8)	44.7 (7.1)	37.3 (2.9)	53.9 (12.2)
Average precipitation inches (mm)	1.8 (46)	2.7 (69)	2.8 (71)	5.1 (130)	4.8 (120)	2.8 (71)	2.2 (56)	2.3 (58)	4.9 (120)	4.5 (110)	2.8 (71)	2.9 (74)	39.5 (1,000)
Source: Weatherbase

== Demographics ==
Historical population
Census	Pop.	Note	%±
1900	362		—
1910	537		48.3%
1920	580		8.0%
1930	512		−11.7%
1940	677		32.2%
1950	599		−11.5%
1960	621		3.7%
1970	844		35.9%
1980	1,002		18.7%
1990	1,360		35.7%
2000	1,370		0.7%
2010	1,394		1.8%
2020	1,414		1.4%
U.S. Decennial Census

As of the 2020 census, 1,414 people, 531 households, and 447 families were residing in the city.

=== 2020 census ===
The median age was 39.7 years. 23.5% of residents were under the age of 18 and 18.5% of residents were 65 years of age or older. For every 100 females there were 94.8 males, and for every 100 females age 18 and over there were 93.9 males age 18 and over.

0.0% of residents lived in urban areas, while 100.0% lived in rural areas.

There were 531 households in Quinlan, of which 33.7% had children under the age of 18 living in them. Of all households, 42.0% were married-couple households, 19.6% were households with a male householder and no spouse or partner present, and 31.8% were households with a female householder and no spouse or partner present. About 27.1% of all households were made up of individuals and 14.7% had someone living alone who was 65 years of age or older.

There were 646 housing units, of which 17.8% were vacant. The homeowner vacancy rate was 3.2% and the rental vacancy rate was 20.6%.

Racial composition as of the 2020 census
Race	Number	Percent
White	1,156	81.8%
Black or African American	23	1.6%
American Indian and Alaska Native	12	0.8%
Asian	11	0.8%
Native Hawaiian and Other Pacific Islander	1	0.1%
Some other race	81	5.7%
Two or more races	130	9.2%
Hispanic or Latino (of any race)	204	14.4%

== Education ==
The city is served by the Quinlan Independent School District, including CB Thompson Middle School and Ford High School.

Other portions of Quinlan are served by the Boles Independent School District.

== Infrastructure ==
=== Health care ===
Hunt Regional Medical Center operates a family-practice physician's office in Quinlan and a full-service medical emergency center. Several dental offices are in Quinlan.

=== Transportation ===
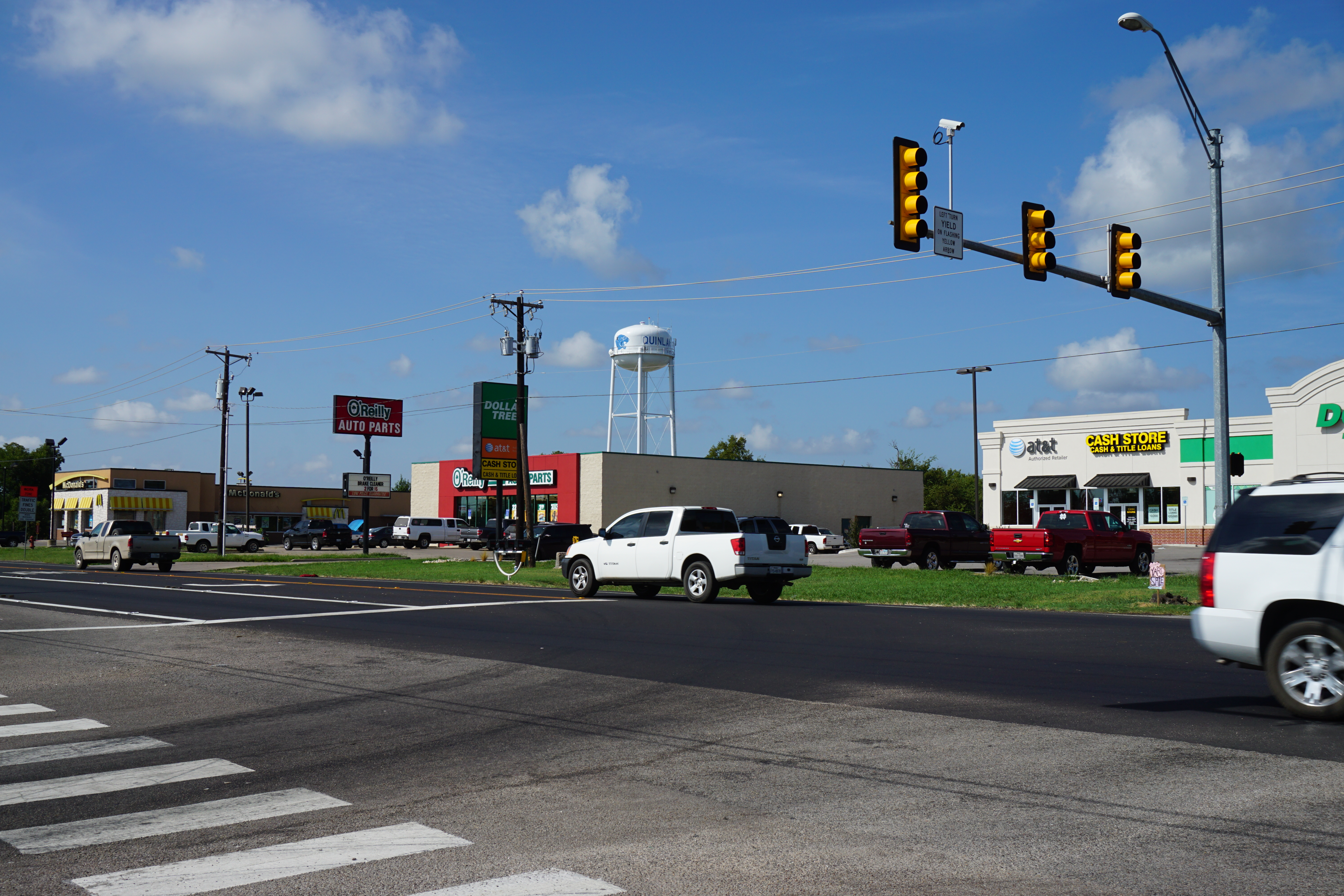
State Highway 34 in Quinlan

- Texas State Highway 34 is a north-south route that goes through the center of Quinlan. It connects with Terrell to the south and Greenville to the north.
- Texas State Highway 276 is an east-west route that is known locally as Quinlan Parkway. It connects with Rockwall to the west and Emory to the east.
- Texas State Highway Loop 264 runs from downtown Quinlan connecting SH 276 and SH 34.
- Farm-to-market Road 751 heads south towards Wills Point.
- Farm-to-market Road 2101 is a few miles outside of Quinlan at Boles Home. It heads north towards L3Harris and Majors Airport in Greenville.
- Rockin' M Airport is a municipal airport a few miles outside of Quinlan near Boles Home on FM 2101, and Majors Airport is roughly 20 minutes away in nearby Greenville.

Public transit is provided by The Connection, which serves Quinlan and all of Hunt County. The service operates Monday through Friday from 7 am to 7 pm. Reservations have to be made one day in advance. The charge is $2 ($4 round trip) if the passenger is traveling to a place within the same community or city, and $3 ($6 round trip) if the passenger is traveling from one city or community to another within Hunt County. The Connection will take Hunt County residents to Dallas as a round trip only. Passengers are charged $34, and a minimum of three passengers is also required.

== Notable person ==
- Uel Eubanks, baseball pitcher for the 1922 Chicago Cubs.
