= Wolfe City Independent School District =

School district in Texas, United States

- 505 W. Dallas St Wolfe City, TX 75496 United States

District information
- Type: Independent school district
- Grades: Pre-K - 12
- Superintendent: Anthony Figueroa
- School board: Ola Owens; Jill Woodruff; Charolette Gardner; James Scott; DeAnna Henslee; Charmayne Cherry-Scott; John Tisdale
- Schools: 3
- NCES District ID: 4846350

Students and staff
- Students: 663 (2019 - 2020)
- Teachers: 59.23 (2019 - 2020 State FTE Count)
- District mascot: Wolves
- Colors: Blue and white

Other information
- Website: https://www.wcisd.net

Wolfe City Independent School District is a public school district based in Wolfe City, Texas (USA).

Located in Hunt County, the district extends into a small portion of Fannin County.

== Schools ==
- Wolfe City High School (Grades 9–12)
- Wolfe City Middle School (Grades 6–8)
- Wolfe City Elementary School (Grades PK-5)
- Wolfe City Early Childhood Learning Center

== Academic Achievement ==
In 2019, the school district was rated "A" by the Texas Education Agency. In 2020, all school districts were given the "Not Rated" rating due to the COVID-19 pandemic.

Historical TEA district accountability ratings
Year	Rating
2020	Not Rated
2019	A
2018	B
2017	Met Standard
2016	Met Standard
2015	Met Standard
2014	Met Standard
2013	Met Standard
2012	No ratings assigned
2011	Recognized
2010	Exemplary
2009	Exemplary
2008	Recognized
2007	Academically Acceptable
2006	Recognized
2005	Academically Acceptable
2004	Academically Acceptable
2003	No ratings assigned
2002	Recognized
2001	Exemplary
2000	Recognized
1999	Recognized
1998	Exemplary
1997	Recognized
1996	Recognized
1995	Accredited

== Sports ==
Wolfe City High School participates in football, volleyball, basketball, baseball, softball, tennis, golf, powerlifting, track and field, and cheerleading. For school years in 2020 - 2022, Wolfe City High School will play in UIL Class 2A.

== Construction Projects ==
In 2008, the Wolfe City Independent School District broke ground on a multi-million dollar modernization project for the elementary and middle school campuses along with the construction of a new multi-purpose building. The multi-purpose building was set to have a state-of-the-art kitchen and serving area along with a stage for auditorium use. The improvements to the two campuses included new classrooms, tilework, air conditioning upgrades, paint, a new elevator, and covered walkways. The project was estimated to cost $4.65 million and was to be completed in August 2009.

A new gymnasium was completed in December 2010 to be used by Wolfe City Middle School.
