= Bland Independent School District =

School district in Texas, United States

Coordinates: 33°12′36″N 96°17′34″W

Location
- Merit, Texas ESC Region 10 USA

District information
- Type: Public
- Motto: Live To Learn, Learn To Live
- Grades: Pre-K through 12
- Superintendent: Brian Bymaster
- Schools: 4 (2024-2025)
- NCES District ID: 4810350

Students and staff
- Students: 794 (2021-2022)
- Teachers: 65.95 (2021-2022) (on full-time equivalent (FTE) basis)
- Student–teacher ratio: 12.04 (2021-2022)
- Athletic conference: UIL Class 2A
- District mascot: Tigers
- Colors: Blue, Gold

Other information
- TEA District Accountability Rating for 2011-12: Recognized
- Website: www.blandisd.us

Bland Independent School District is a public school district in the community of Merit, Texas, United States. In addition to Merit, the district serves Floyd and Wagner in Hunt County. A small portion of the district extends into Collin County. The district operates one high school, Bland High School.

== Finances ==
As of the 2017–2018 school year, the appraised valuation of property in the district was $188,377,841. The maintenance tax rate was $0.104 and the bond tax rate was $0.0316 per $100 of appraised valuation.

== Academic achievement ==
In 2018, the school district was rated "A" by the Texas Education Agency. Sixteen percent of districts in Texas in 2018 received the same rating. A school district in Texas can receive one of five possible rankings from the Texas Education Agency: A - Exemplary B - Recognized c - Acceptable D - In need of improvement F - Unacceptable

Historical TEA district accountability ratings

- 2018: A
- 2017: Met Standard
- 2011: Recognized
- 2010: Exemplary
- 2009: Academically acceptable
- 2008: Academically acceptable
- 2007: Recognized
- 2006: Academically acceptable
- 2005: Recognized
- 2004: Academically acceptable

== Schools ==
- Bland High (grades 9–12)
- Bland Middle (grades 6–8)
- Bland Elementary (prekindergarten-grade 5)

== Special programs ==
=== Athletics ===
Bland ISD offers a variety of sports; in elementary school, children must participate in physical education (PE) and have daily recess. At Bland Middle School in sixth grade, student pick between preathletics or PE. In seventh and eighth, students who picked preathletics participate in athletics, which is the official junior high team for Bland Middle School. Along with this, baseball, track and field, and other sports are available. Bland High school offers sports baseball, basketball, tennis, golf, and track and field. Bland ISD does not offer football, but the schools are notable for their success in basketball and golf.

== See also ==
- List of school districts in Texas
- List of high schools in Texas
