= Lone Oak Independent School District =

Public school district in Texas, USA

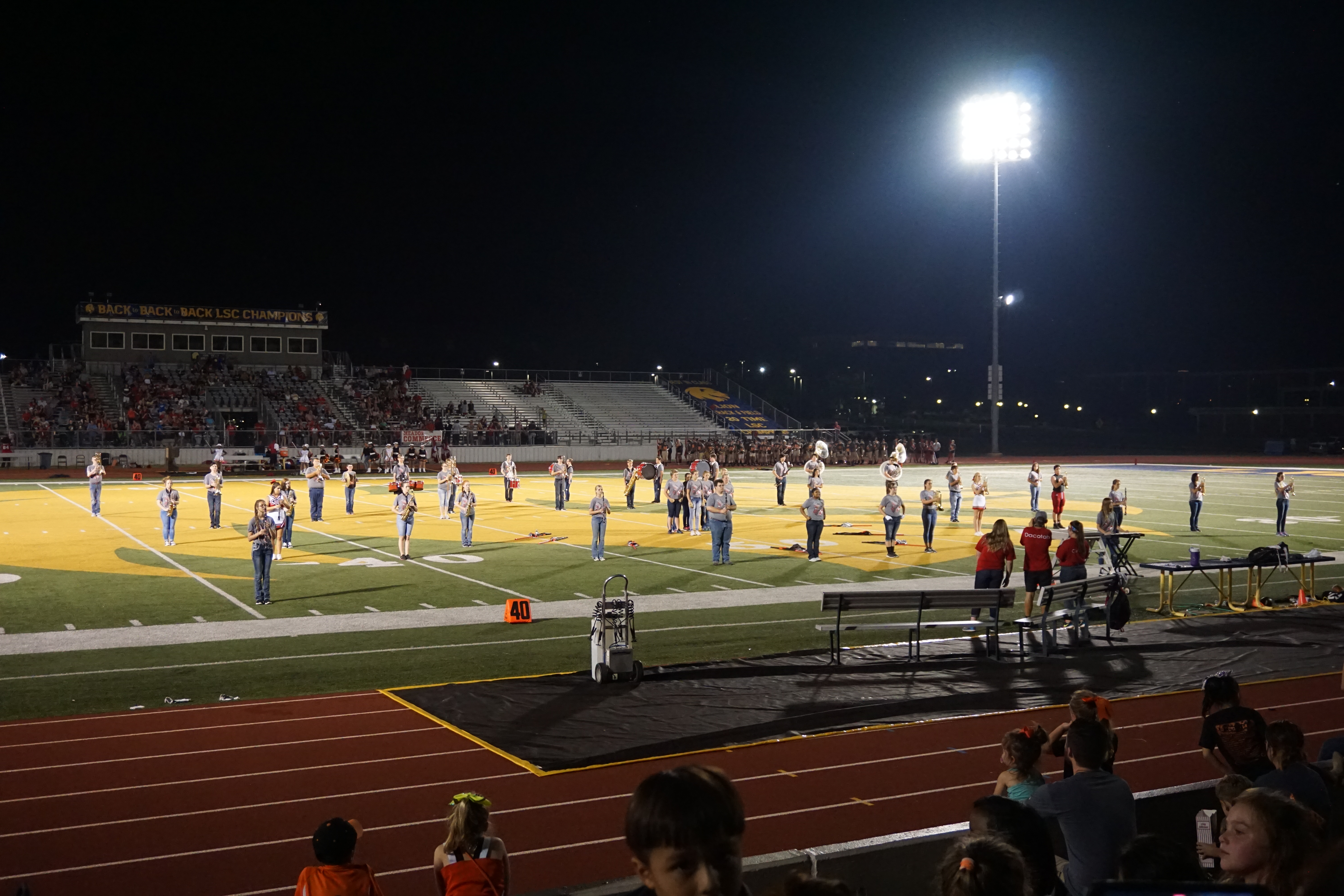
Lone Oak High School Marching Band

Lone Oak Independent School District is a public school district based in Lone Oak, Texas, United States. Located in Hunt County, a small portion of the district extends into Rains County. It covers 98 square miles.

The district is managed by a seven-member board. The superintendent is Janeé Carter. The district educates around 860 students, in four schools, and employs about 65 teachers.

Standard & Poor's rated its general obligation debt as 'A'. It described the financial position as "consistently strong" in view of state support for its operations.

The district was the subject of a Texas Supreme Court case in July 1974. A student challenged a school regulation that prohibits married students from participating in extracurricular activities. The court decided that this was a matter for the district's board to decide on the policy. This was upheld on appeal.

In 2009, the school district was rated "recognized" by the Texas Education Agency.

== Schools ==
- Lone Oak High School (grades 9-12)
- Lone Oak Middle School (grades 5-8)
- Lone Oak Elementary School (prekindergarten-grade 4)
