= Hunt Regional Medical Center =

Hospital in Texas USA, founded 1971

Coordinates: 33.1223°N 96.1241°W

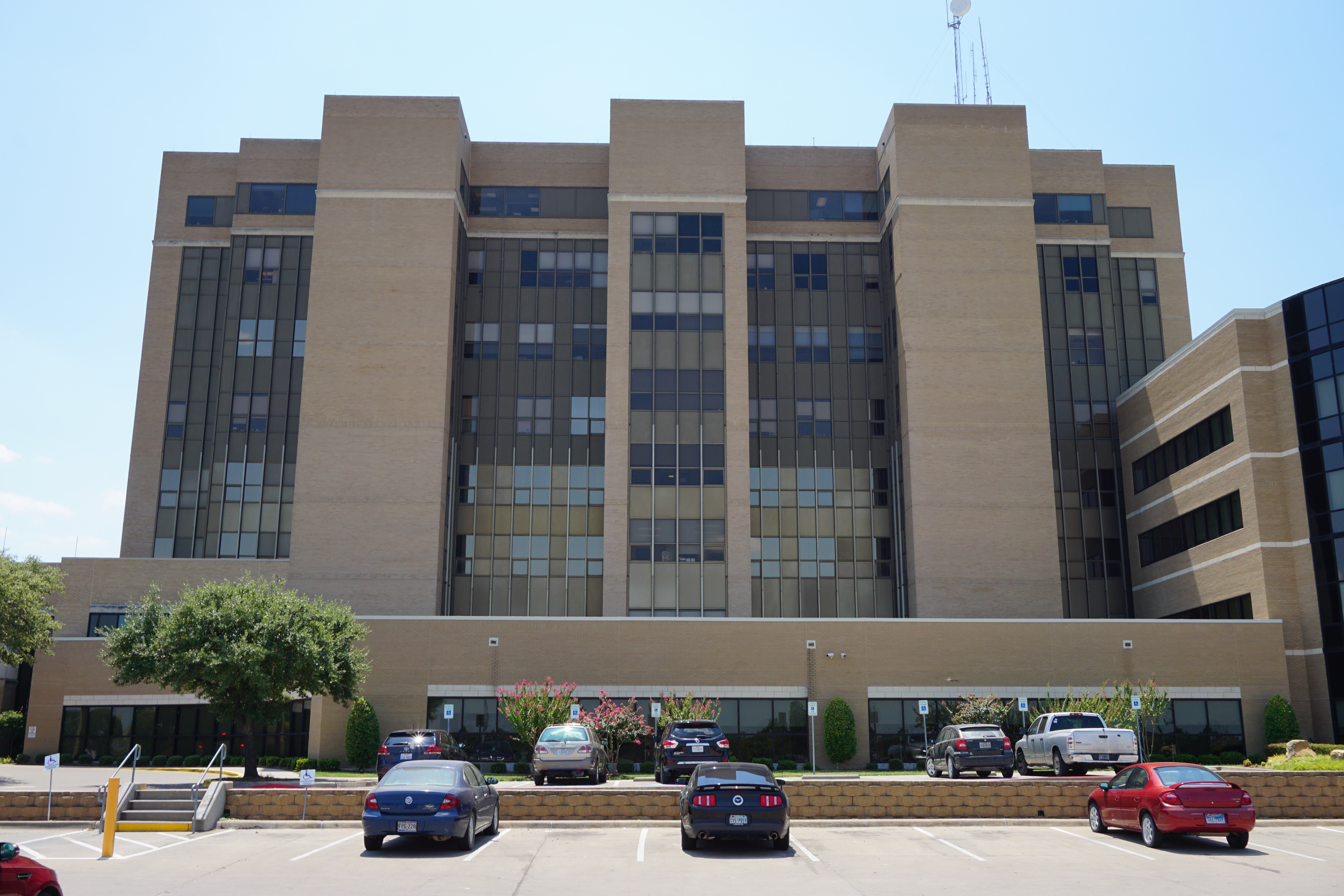

Geography
- Location: 4215 Joe Ramsey Boulevard, Greenville, Texas, United States

Organization
- Care system: Medicaid, Medicare, Public
- Type: Not-for-profit

Services
- Emergency department: Yes, Level III
- Beds: 187

History
- Founded: August 1, 1971

Links
- Website: www.huntregional.org
- Lists: Hospitals in Texas

Hunt Regional Medical Center (or Hunt Regional) is a full-service hospital located at 4215 Joe Ramsey Boulevard in Greenville, Texas. The hospital opened on August 1, 1971, and has since undergone numerous expansions. Hunt Regional serves patients in Hunt County and surrounding areas.

== History ==
Hunt Regional Healthcare facilities in Hunt County trace their origins to the 1950s. At that time, a group of concerned citizens determined that hospital and medical care needs of this area could best be met by a public, open-staffed hospital. Citizens General Hospital opened in 1971 and was expanded in 1981 and renamed Hunt Memorial Hospital District. The hospital was formerly known as the Presbyterian Hospital of Greenville until September 2008, when it was rebranded with its current name, Hunt Regional Medical Center.

The hospital offers an extensive list of services including a surgery center, digital imaging, behavioral health, the Lou and Jack Finney Cancer Center, home care, infusion therapy, laboratory services, a Level III NICU, mobile mammography, wound care, rehabilitation center, a surgery center, women & infant care and more.

=== Lou and Jack Finney Cancer Center ===
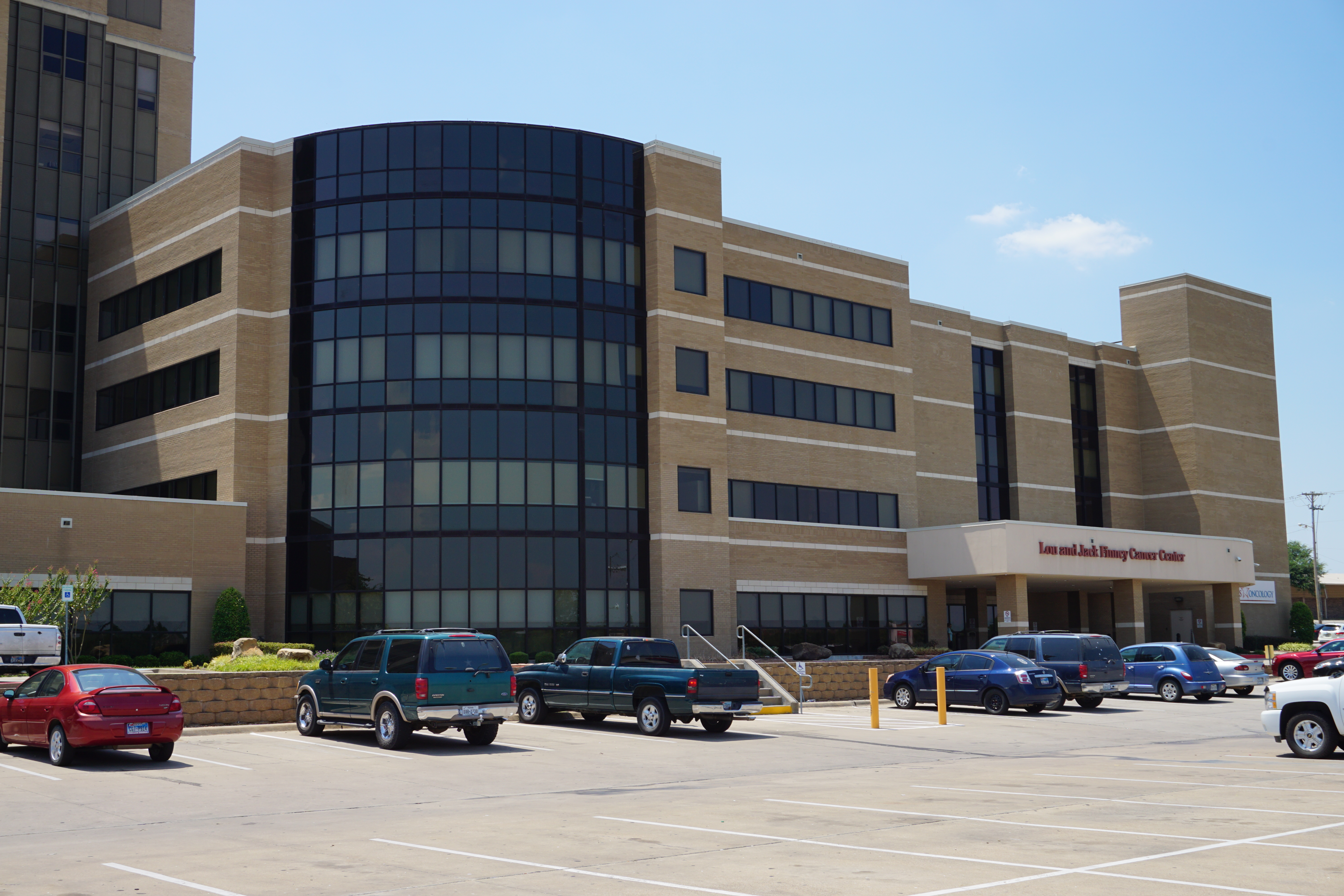
The Lou and Jack Finney Cancer Center in August 2015

The Lou and Jack Finney Cancer Center opened in 2007 as the first of its kind offered in the region. Operated by Texas Oncology, the center's treatment options include chemotherapy and radiation therapy, as well as laboratory and pharmaceutical services.

== Hunt Regional Healthcare ==
Hunt Regional Medical Center is one of the facilities operated under the Hunt Regional Healthcare system. Additional facilities include Hunt Regional Open Imaging at Greenville and Hunt Regional Open Imaging at Rockwall. Hunt Regional Emergency Medical Center at Commerce and Hunt Regional Medical Emergency Center at Quinlan recently opened. Physician offices are located in Greenville, Commerce, Quinlan, Emory, Royse City and Rockwall.
