= Cal Dorsett =

American baseball player (1913–1970)

- Pitcher
- Born: June 10, 1913; Lone Oak, Texas, U.S.
- Died: October 22, 1970 (aged 57); Elk City, Oklahoma, U.S.
- Batted: Right Threw: Right

MLB debut
- August 19, 1940, for the Cleveland Indians

Last MLB appearance
- September 14, 1947, for the Cleveland Indians

MLB statistics
- Win–loss record: 0–1
- Earned run average: 11.85
- Innings pitched: 13 2/3
- Stats at Baseball Reference

Teams
- Cleveland Indians (1940–1941; 1947)

Calvin Leavelle Dorsett (June 10, 1913 – October 22, 1970), nicknamed "Preacher", was an American professional baseball player. The native of Lone Oak, Texas, was a 6 ft (1.8 m), 180 lb (82 kg) right-handed pitcher whose career lasted for nine seasons (1937–1941; 1946–1949). He served in the United States Marine Corps during World War II in the Pacific Theater of Operations, and missed the 1942–1945 baseball seasons.

Dorsett worked in eight games pitched, two as a starter, in the Major Leagues for the Cleveland Indians in 1940–1941 and 1947. In 13 2/3 innings pitched, he allowed 25 hits, 13 bases on balls and 18 earned runs. He struck out six.
