= Hawk Cove, Texas =

- City
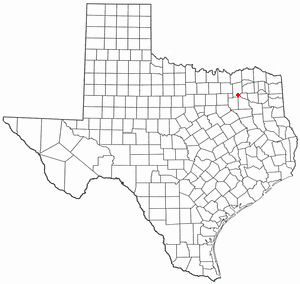
- Location of Hawk Cove, Texas

- Coordinates: 32°53′02″N 96°05′00″W
- Country: United States
- State: Texas
- County: Hunt

Area
  - Total: 0.37 sq mi (0.95 km^{2})
  - Land: 0.37 sq mi (0.95 km^{2})
  - Water: 0 sq mi (0.00 km^{2})
- Elevation: 472 ft (144 m)

Population (2020)
  - Total: 452
  - Density: 1,200/sq mi (480/km^{2})
- Time zone: UTC-6 (Central (CST))
  - Summer (DST): UTC-5 (CDT)
- ZIP code: 75474
- Area codes: 903, 430
- FIPS code: 48-32810
- GNIS feature ID: 2410717

Hawk Cove is a city in Hunt County, Texas, United States. The population was recorded as 452 at the 2020 census. Hawk Cove and Hunt County are both part of the Dallas–Fort Worth–Arlington Metropolitan Statistical Area.

== History ==
Development of the primarily residential community began in the early 1970s by property owners Sawyer and Culberson. Properties were originally known as Whiskers Retreat Nos. 1, 2, and 3. In January 1999, the community incorporated under the name Hawk Cove. The city has experienced a 34 percent increase in population since 2000, rising from 457 to over 600 by 2008.

== Geography ==
Hawk Cove is located south of State Highway 276 and east of FM 751 in southern Hunt County, approximately 16 miles south of Greenville.

According to the United States Census Bureau, the city has a total area of 0.3 square miles (0.78 km^{2}), all land.

Hawk Cove is situated on Lake Tawakoni, a 36,700 acres (149 km^{2}) reservoir constructed in 1960.

== Demographics ==
Historical population
Census	Pop.	Note	%±
2000	457		—
2010	483		5.7%
2020	452		−6.4%
U.S. Decennial Census; 2020 Census

=== 2020 census ===
As of the 2020 census, Hawk Cove had a population of 452. The median age was 42.1 years. 24.3% of residents were under the age of 18 and 10.2% of residents were 65 years of age or older. For every 100 females there were 89.1 males, and for every 100 females age 18 and over there were 87.9 males age 18 and over.

0.0% of residents lived in urban areas, while 100.0% lived in rural areas.

There were 166 households in Hawk Cove, of which 30.7% had children under the age of 18 living in them. Of all households, 41.0% were married-couple households, 18.1% were households with a male householder and no spouse or partner present, and 34.3% were households with a female householder and no spouse or partner present. About 21.1% of all households were made up of individuals and 6.0% had someone living alone who was 65 years of age or older.

There were 216 housing units, of which 23.1% were vacant. The homeowner vacancy rate was 2.7% and the rental vacancy rate was 6.5%.

Racial composition as of the 2020 census
Race	Number	Percent
White	331	73.2%
Black or African American	2	0.4%
American Indian and Alaska Native	9	2.0%
Asian	1	0.2%
Native Hawaiian and Other Pacific Islander	0	0.0%
Some other race	51	11.3%
Two or more races	58	12.8%
Hispanic or Latino (of any race)	109	24.1%

=== 2000 census ===
As of the 2000 census, there were 457 people, 174 households, and 127 families residing in the city. The population density was 1,465.7 inhabitants per square mile (565.9/km^{2}). There were 245 housing units at an average density of 785.8 per square mile (303.4/km^{2}). The racial makeup of the city was 93.87% White, 1.09% African American, 1.09% Native American, 0.22% Asian, 1.31% from other races, and 2.41% from two or more races. Hispanic or Latino of any race were 6.78% of the population.

There were 174 households, out of which 24.7% had children under the age of 18 living with them, 52.3% were married couples living together, 13.2% had a female householder with no husband present, and 27.0% were non-families. 23.0% of all households were made up of individuals, and 12.1% had someone living alone who was 65 years of age or older. The average household size was 2.63 and the average family size was 2.99.

In the city, the population was spread out, with 25.8% under the age of 18, 7.2% from 18 to 24, 24.5% from 25 to 44, 25.6% from 45 to 64, and 16.8% who were 65 years of age or older. The median age was 40 years. For every 100 females, there were 88.1 males. For every 100 females age 18 and over, there were 84.2 males.

The median income for a household in the city was $23,226, and the median income for a family was $23,669. Males had a median income of $31,071 versus $21,750 for females. The per capita income for the city was $10,375. About 10.1% of families and 9.6% of the population were below the poverty line, including 11.6% of those under age 18 and 17.5% of those age 65 or over.

== Education ==
Public education is provided by the Quinlan Independent School District.
