= Floyd, Texas =

- Unincorporated community
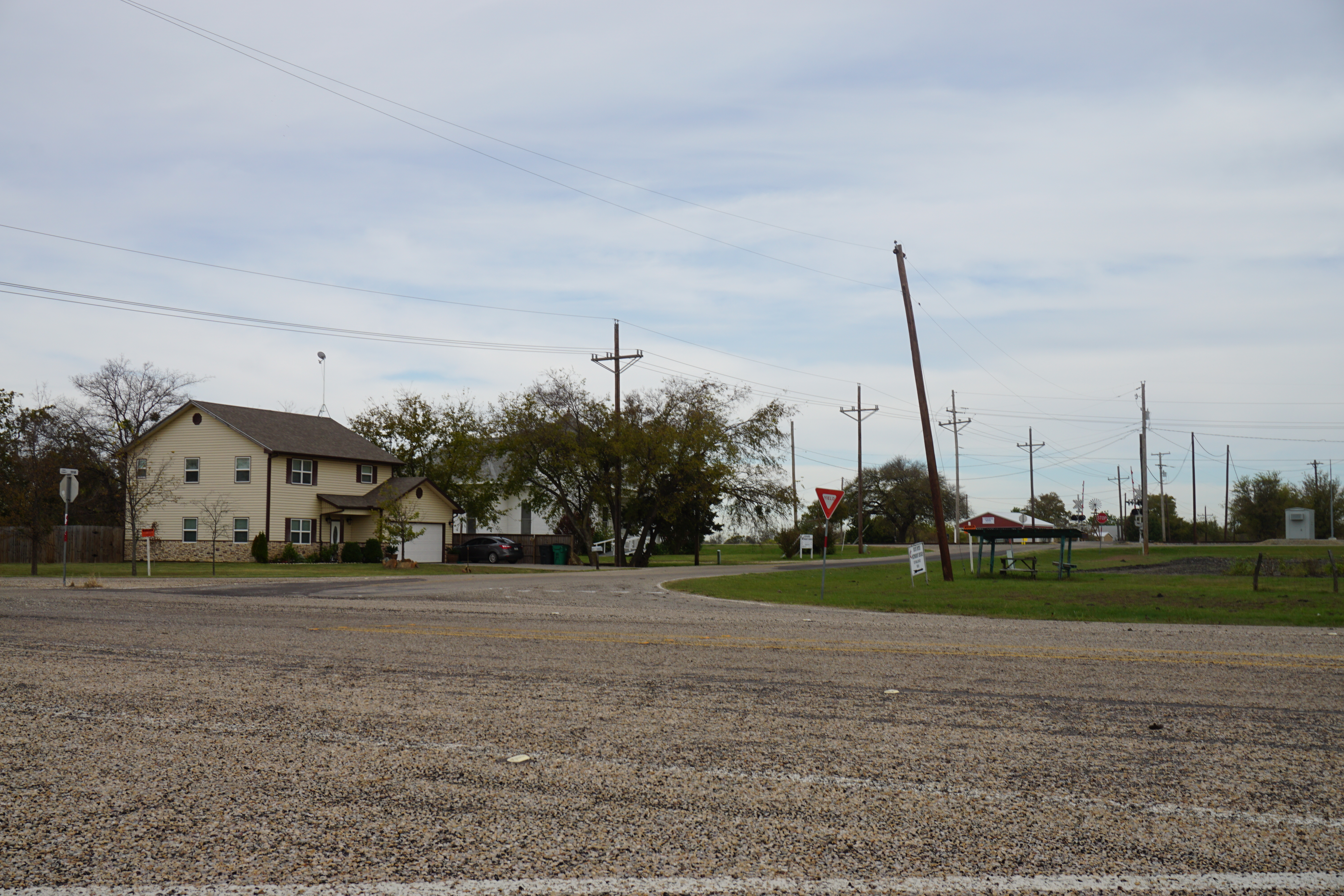
- Farm to Market Road 1118 in Floyd

- Location within Texas Location within the United States
- Coordinates: 33°8′55″N 96°14′42″W
- Country: United States
- State: Texas
- County: Hunt
- Time zone: UTC-6 (Central (CST))
  - Summer (DST): UTC-5 (CDT)
- GNIS feature ID: 1378308

Floyd is an unincorporated community in Hunt County, Texas, United States. It is located eight miles west of Greenville (the community has a Greenville address for USPS purposes).

The Bland Independent School District serves area students.

The North American branch of the Nigerian-based Redeemed Christian Church of God (including Redemption Camp and a 10,000 seat auditorium) is located north of Floyd on County Road 1118.

== History ==
The community was first called Oliverea, after an official of the East Line and Red River Railroad (actual name Oliver) in 1882 when the railroad was expanding its service west from Greenville to McKinney.

That same year, a post office was opened but the locals balked at their town being named for a stranger. Foster was suggested, but rejected by postal authorities. Their second choice was Floyd. The reason was lost but it is thought that it was done to honor a dispatch rider of the Texas Revolutionary Army. The name was in effect in 1887.

In 1904, Floyd's population was 231 and it reached a high-water mark of 300 at the onset of the Great Depression. Development of modern roads favored the county seat of Greenville and Floyd suffered as a result. The post office closed in the 1930s and the population went into decline. After World War II, the population was just 150 and only three businesses had managed to hold on. In the early 1950s, the population had dipped to a mere 70 residents, but by the mid 1970s it had increased to 220 – the same figure given for the 2000 census.
