= Campbell, Texas =

- City
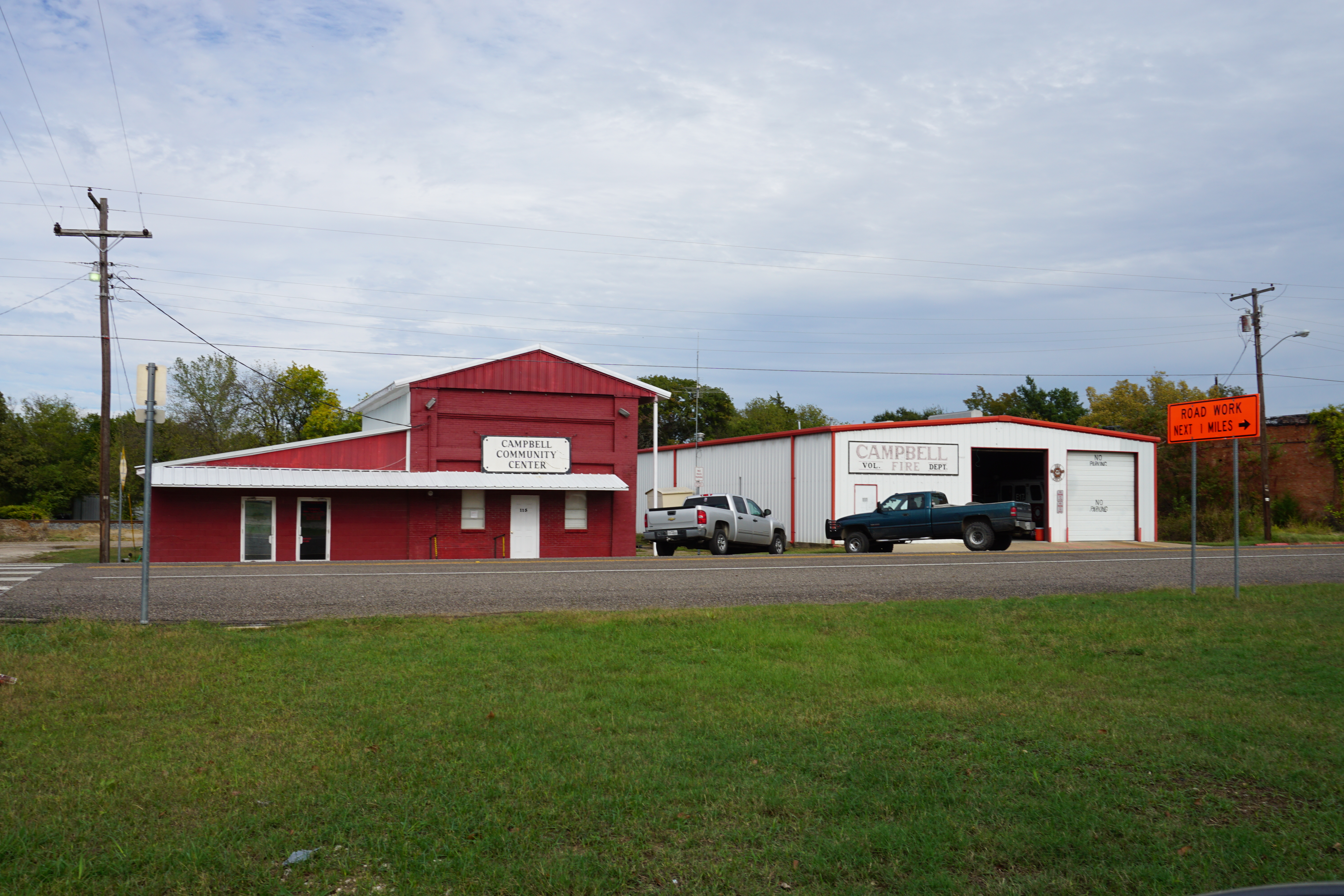
- Main Street in Campbell

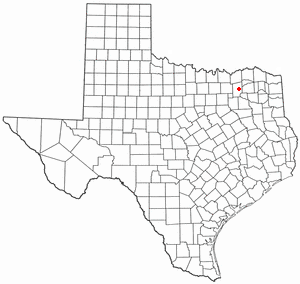
- Location of Campbell, Texas

- Coordinates: 33°08′53″N 95°57′13″W
- Country: United States
- State: Texas
- County: Hunt

Area
  - Total: 1.34 sq mi (3.47 km^{2})
  - Land: 1.33 sq mi (3.45 km^{2})
  - Water: 0.0077 sq mi (0.02 km^{2})
- Elevation: 591 ft (180 m)

Population (2020)
  - Total: 542
  - Density: 407/sq mi (157/km^{2})
- Time zone: UTC-6 (Central (CST))
  - Summer (DST): UTC-5 (CDT)
- ZIP code: 75422
- Area codes: 903, 430
- FIPS code: 48-12112
- GNIS feature ID: 2409972
- Website: https://campbelltx.municipalimpact.com/

Campbell is a city in Hunt County, in the U.S. state of Texas. The population was 542 at the 2020 census, down from 638 at the 2010 census.

== Geography ==
Campbell is in eastern Hunt County. Texas State Highway 24 runs through the northwestern side of the city, and the city limits extend southward from downtown to include Interstate 30, which provides access via exits 101 and 104. I-30 leads west 10 miles (16 km) to Greenville, the Hunt county seat, and east 20 miles (32 km) to Sulphur Springs, while Highway 24 leads northeast 8 miles (13 km) to Commerce.

According to the United States Census Bureau, Campbell has a total area of 1.6 square miles (4.2 km^{2}), of which 0.01 square miles (0.02 km^{2}), or 0.42%, are water.

== History ==
The town was established in 1880 and was named for postmaster general and future Texas governor Thomas Mitchell Campbell.

== Demographics ==
Historical population
Census	Pop.	Note	%±
1920	583		—
1930	416		−28.6%
1940	428		2.9%
1980	549		—
1990	683		24.4%
2000	734		7.5%
2010	638		−13.1%
2020	542		−15.0%
U.S. Decennial Census

=== 2020 census ===
As of the 2020 census, Campbell had a population of 542. The median age was 40.2 years; 21.2% of residents were under the age of 18 and 18.8% of residents were 65 years of age or older. For every 100 females there were 101.5 males, and for every 100 females age 18 and over there were 97.7 males age 18 and over.

There were 209 households in Campbell, of which 30.6% had children under the age of 18 living in them. Of all households, 44.0% were married-couple households, 20.6% were households with a male householder and no spouse or partner present, and 26.3% were households with a female householder and no spouse or partner present. About 26.8% of all households were made up of individuals and 12.4% had someone living alone who was 65 years of age or older.

There were 258 housing units, of which 19.0% were vacant. Among occupied housing units, 84.2% were owner-occupied and 15.8% were renter-occupied. The homeowner vacancy rate was 5.2% and the rental vacancy rate was 34.0%.

0% of residents lived in urban areas, while 100.0% lived in rural areas.

Racial composition as of the 2020 census
Race	Percent
White	83.0%
Black or African American	2.8%
American Indian and Alaska Native	1.5%
Asian	0.2%
Native Hawaiian and Other Pacific Islander	0%
Some other race	3.5%
Two or more races	9.0%
Hispanic or Latino (of any race)	11.1%

== Education ==
The city is served by the Campbell Independent School District, home of the Indians. The high school's athletes participate in such sports as six-man football, tennis, basketball, baseball, softball, track and field, golf, and cross-country sprinting.
