= Lone Oak, Texas =

- City
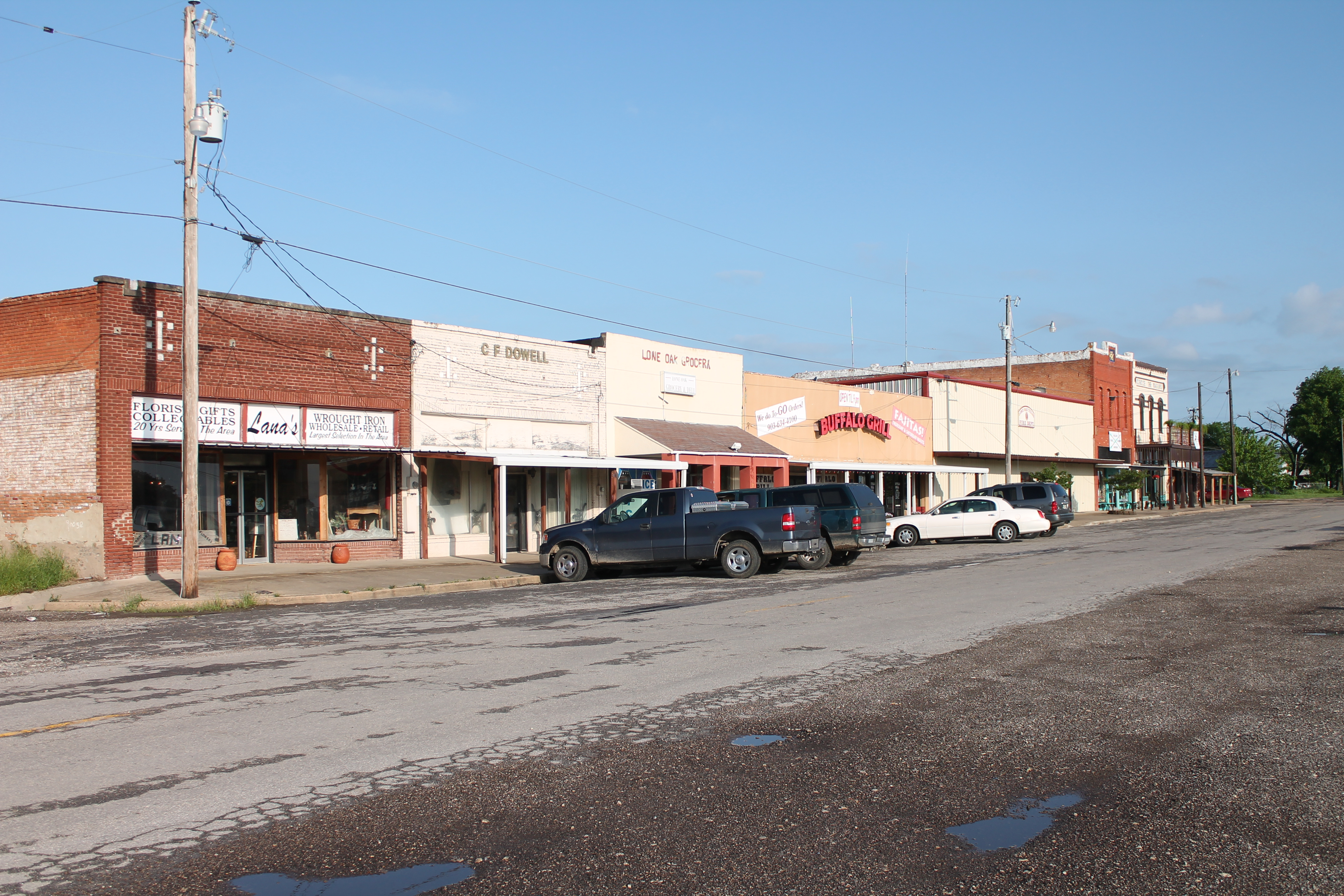
- Lone Oak

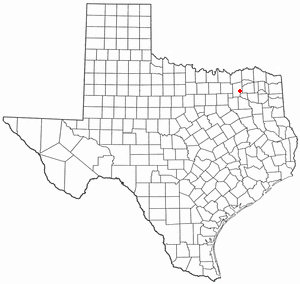
- Location of Lone Oak, Texas

- Coordinates: 33°00′03″N 95°56′27″W
- Country: United States
- State: Texas
- County: Hunt

Area
  - Total: 1.11 sq mi (2.88 km^{2})
  - Land: 1.11 sq mi (2.88 km^{2})
  - Water: 0 sq mi (0.00 km^{2})
- Elevation: 561 ft (171 m)

Population (2020)
  - Total: 643
  - Density: 578/sq mi (223/km^{2})
- Time zone: UTC-6 (Central (CST))
  - Summer (DST): UTC-5 (CDT)
- ZIP code: 75453
- Area codes: 903, 430
- FIPS code: 48-43636
- GNIS feature ID: 2410862
- Website: cityofloneoaktx.com

Lone Oak is a city in Hunt County, Texas, United States. Its population was 643 at the 2020 census, 598 at the 2010 census, and 521 at the 2000 census.

== Geography ==
Lone Oak is located in southeastern Hunt County. U.S. Route 69 runs through the center of the city, leading northwest 15 miles (24 km) to Greenville, the county seat, and southeast 13 miles (21 km) to Emory.

According to the United States Census Bureau, Lone Oak has a total area of 1.10 square miles (2.85 km^{2}), all land. The city is in the watershed of the Sabine River.

== History ==
Settlers first came to the area in the 1850s. The city was named after a lone oak tree in the prairie. A post office was established in 1869. Tracks of the Missouri, Kansas, and Texas Railroad were built through the area in 1890, and Lone Oak was incorporated that same year.

== Demographics ==
Historical population
Census	Pop.	Note	%±
1880	79		—
1890	443		460.8%
1900	496		12.0%
1910	756		52.4%
1920	1,017		34.5%
1930	726		−28.6%
1940	735		1.2%
1950	571		−22.3%
1960	495		−13.3%
1970	518		4.6%
1980	467		−9.8%
1990	521		11.6%
2000	521		0.0%
2010	598		14.8%
2020	643		7.5%
2022 (est.)	742		15.4%
2020 Census

=== 2020 census ===
As of the 2020 census, Lone Oak had a population of 643. The median age was 34.9 years; 32.0% of residents were under 18 and 10.7% were 65 or older. For every 100 females, there were 85.8 males, and for every 100 females 18 and over, there were 84.4 males 18 and over.

None of residents lived in urban areas, while 100.0% lived in rural areas.

Of the 224 households in Lone Oak, 46.9% had children under 18 living in them, 52.7% were married-couple households, 15.2% were households with a male householder and no spouse or partner present, and 27.7% were households with a female householder and no spouse or partner present. About 15.6% of all households were made up of individuals, and 7.6% had someone living alone who was 65 age or older.

The city had 265 housing units, of which 15.5% were vacant. The homeowner vacancy rate was 0.0% and the rental vacancy rate was 24.1%.

Racial composition as of the 2020 census
Race	Number	Percent
White	544	84.6%
Black or African American	27	4.2%
American Indian and Alaska Native	6	0.9%
Asian	7	1.1%
Native Hawaiian and 0ther Pacific Islander	1	0.2%
Some other race	7	1.1%
Two or more races	51	7.9%
Hispanic or Latino (of any race)	55	8.6%

=== 2000 census ===
As of the 2000 census, 598 people, 195 households, and 138 families resided in the town. The population density was 653.5 inhabitants per square mile (252.3/km^{2}). The 234 housing units had an average density of 293.5 per square mile (113.3/km^{2}). The racial makeup of the town was 94.43% White, 3.07% African American, 0.19% Native American, 0.19% Asian, 1.54% from other races, and 0.58% from two or more races. Hispanic or Latino people of any race were 3.84% of the population.

Of the 195 households, 32.8% had children under 18 living with them, 54.9% were married couples living together, 8.7% had a female householder with no husband present, and 29.2% were not families. About 25.1% of all households were made up of individuals, and 14.4% had someone living alone who was 65 or older. The average household size was 2.67, and the average family size was 3.20.

The age distribution was 29.8% under 18, 7.3% from 18 to 24, 28.2% from 25 to 44, 21.3% from 45 to 64, and 13.4% who were 65 or older. The median age was 35 years. For every 100 females, there were 95.1 males. For every 100 females 18 and over, there were 94.7 males.

The median income in the city for a household was $31,875 and for a family was $43,000. Males had a median income of $24,821 versus $19,306 for females. The per capita income for the town was $15,459. About 10.4% of families and 12.8% of the population were below the poverty line, including 13.8% of those under 18 and 24.2% of those 65 or over.

== Education ==
The city is served by the Lone Oak Independent School District, which consist of the Lone Oak High School, Lone Oak Middle School, and Lone Oak Elementary School. Lone Oak ISD had a graduation rate of 100% in school year 2020–2021.

== Notable person ==
- Cal Dorsett, former Major League Baseball player
