= Wolfe City, Texas =

- City
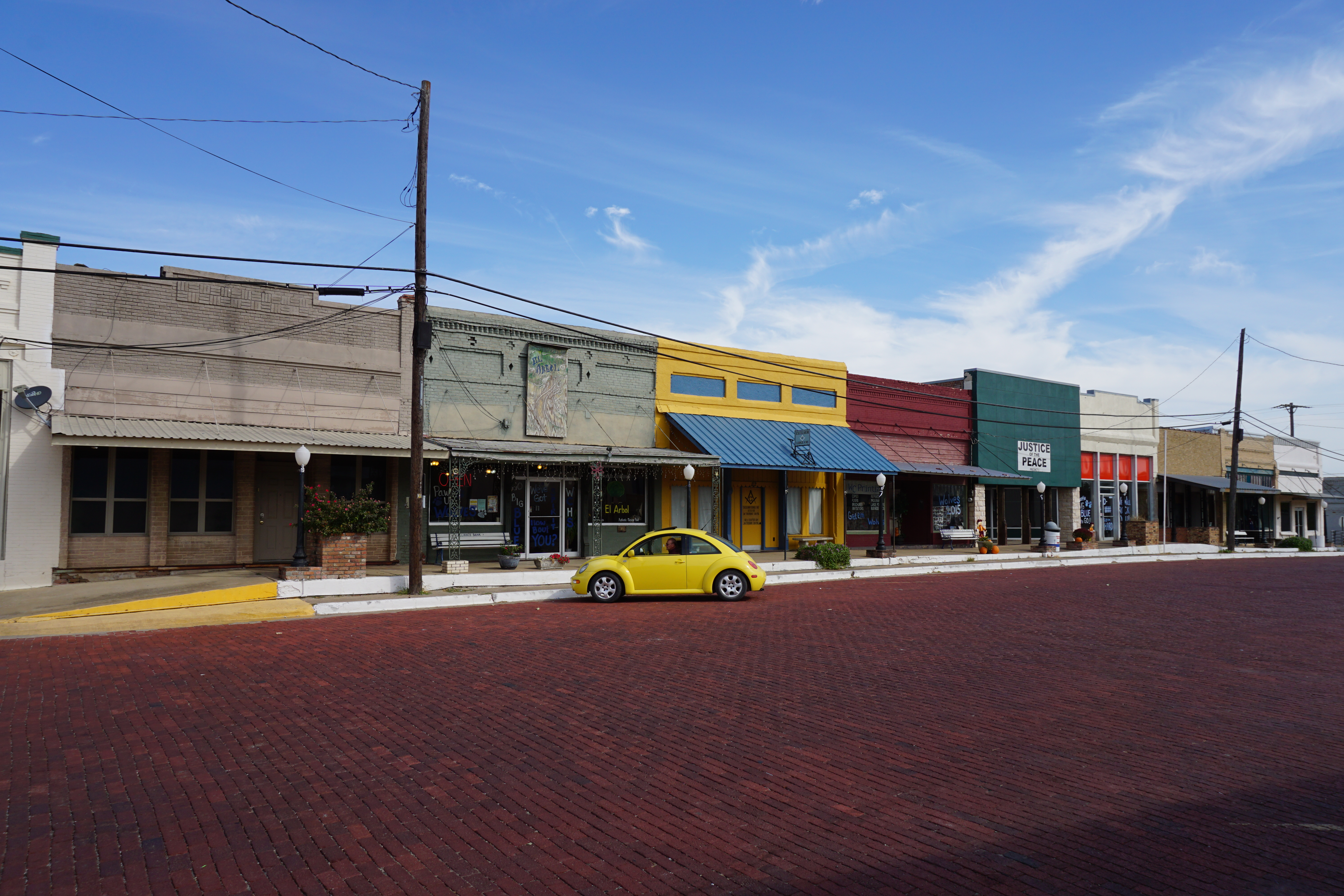
- Main Street in October 2015
- Motto: Caring Folk, Industry, Country Living.
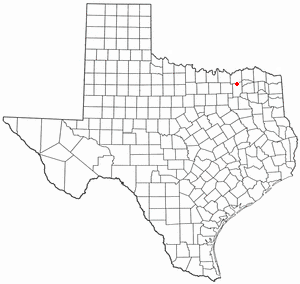
- Location of Wolfe City, Texas

- Coordinates: 33°22′20″N 96°04′18″W
- Country: United States
- State: Texas
- County: Hunt
- Incorporated: 1887

Government
  - Type: Mayor-Council
  - Mayor: Sharion Scott
  - City Council: Cory McElwrath; Jimmy Doolin; Anthony Cruz; Brad Moore; Amy Pickering
  - Chief of Police: Mike Gonzalez
  - Fire Chief: Gene Dawson

Area
  - Total: 1.12 sq mi (2.91 km^{2})
  - Land: 1.12 sq mi (2.91 km^{2})
  - Water: 0 sq mi (0.00 km^{2})
- Elevation: 666 ft (203 m)

Population (2020)
  - Total: 1,399
  - Density: 1,250/sq mi (481/km^{2})
- Time zone: UTC-6 (Central (CST))
  - Summer (DST): UTC-5 (CDT)
- ZIP code: 75496
- Area codes: 903, 430
- FIPS code: 48-79948
- GNIS feature ID: 2412292
- Website: wolfecitytx.org

Wolfe City is a city in Hunt County, Texas, United States, located at the intersection of State Highways 34 and 11. It is 17 miles (27 km) north of Greenville in north-central Hunt County, and was settled in the 1860s or 1870s, when J. Pinckney Wolfe built a mill near the banks of Oyster Creek. The population was 1,399 at the 2020 census, down from 1,412 at the 2010 census.

== Geography ==
Wolfe City is located near the northern border of Hunt County. State Highway 34 runs through the center of town as Santa Fe Street, leading northeast 21 miles (34 km) to Honey Grove and south 17 miles (27 km) to Greenville, the Hunt County seat. State Highway 11 crosses Highway 34 in the northern part of Wolfe City, and runs northwest 23 miles (37 km) to Whitewright and southeast 13 miles (21 km) to Commerce.

According to the United States Census Bureau, Wolfe City has a total area of 1.5 square miles (4.0 km^{2}), of which 1.4 square miles (3.7 km^{2}) are land and 0.1 square miles (0.3 km^{2}), or 7.56%, is covered by water.

== Demographics ==
Historical population
Census	Pop.	Note	%±
1890	867		—
1900	1,549		78.7%
1910	1,402		−9.5%
1920	1,859		32.6%
1930	1,405		−24.4%
1940	1,339		−4.7%
1950	1,345		0.4%
1960	1,317		−2.1%
1970	1,433		8.8%
1980	1,594		11.2%
1990	1,505		−5.6%
2000	1,566		4.1%
2010	1,412		−9.8%
2020	1,399		−0.9%
U.S. Decennial Census

=== 2020 census ===
As of the 2020 census, Wolfe City had a population of 1,399, and the median age was 37.5 years.

28.9% of residents were under the age of 18 and 14.9% of residents were 65 years of age or older.

For every 100 females there were 95.9 males, and for every 100 females age 18 and over there were 88.4 males age 18 and over.

There were 525 households in Wolfe City, of which 39.0% had children under the age of 18 living in them. Of all households, 43.4% were married-couple households, 19.8% were households with a male householder and no spouse or partner present, and 30.7% were households with a female householder and no spouse or partner present. About 29.1% of all households were made up of individuals and 16.0% had someone living alone who was 65 years of age or older. The census recorded 286 families residing in the city.

There were 627 housing units, of which 16.3% were vacant. The homeowner vacancy rate was 6.2% and the rental vacancy rate was 9.9%.

0.0% of residents lived in urban areas, while 100.0% lived in rural areas.

Racial composition as of the 2020 census
Race	Number	Percent
White	1,026	73.3%
Black or African American	134	9.6%
American Indian and Alaska Native	15	1.1%
Asian	9	0.6%
Native Hawaiian and Other Pacific Islander	0	0.0%
Some other race	79	5.6%
Two or more races	136	9.7%
Hispanic or Latino (of any race)	191	13.7%

== Education ==
Wolfe City is served by Wolfe City Independent School District.

== Gallery ==
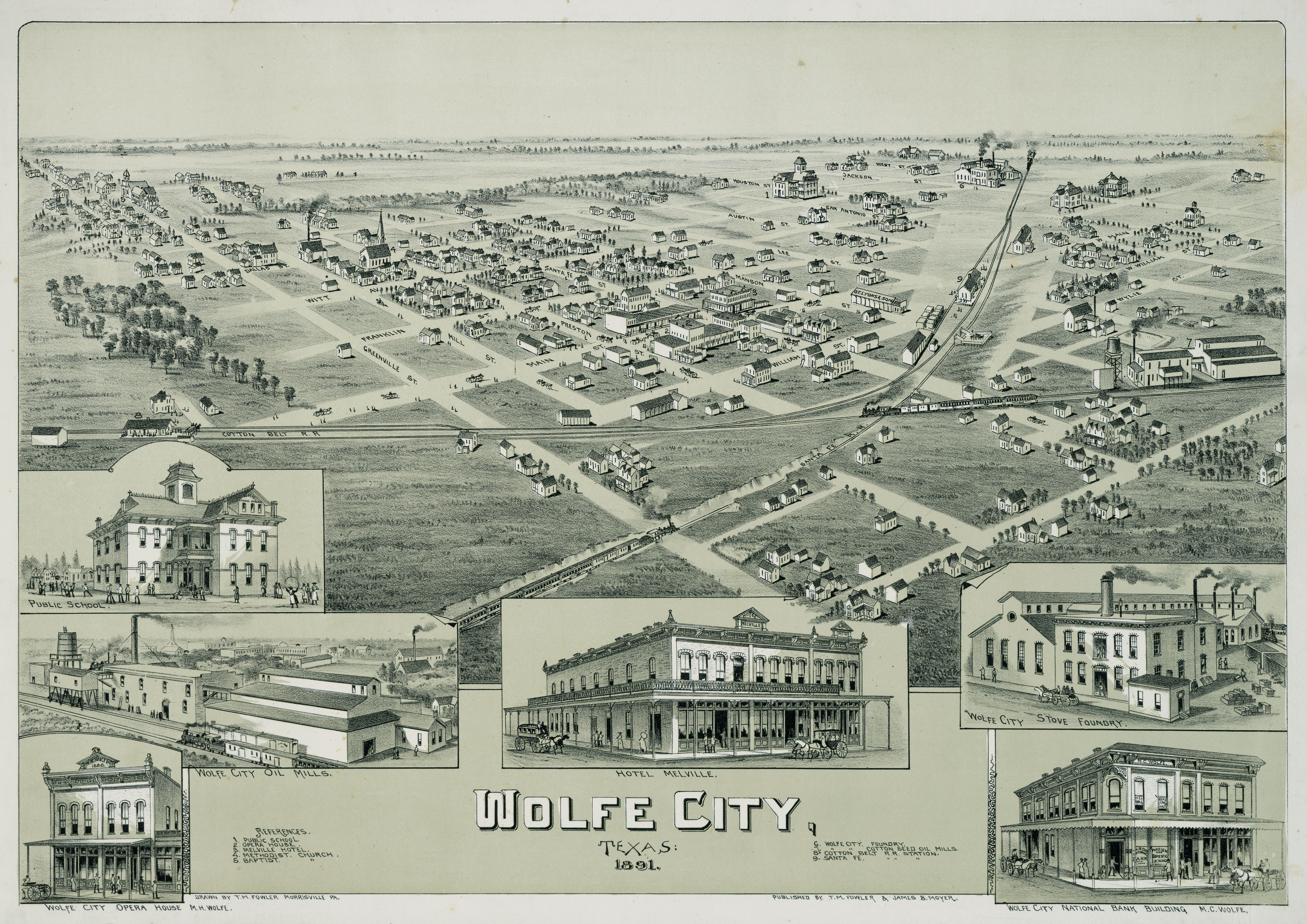
Map of Wolfe City in 1891

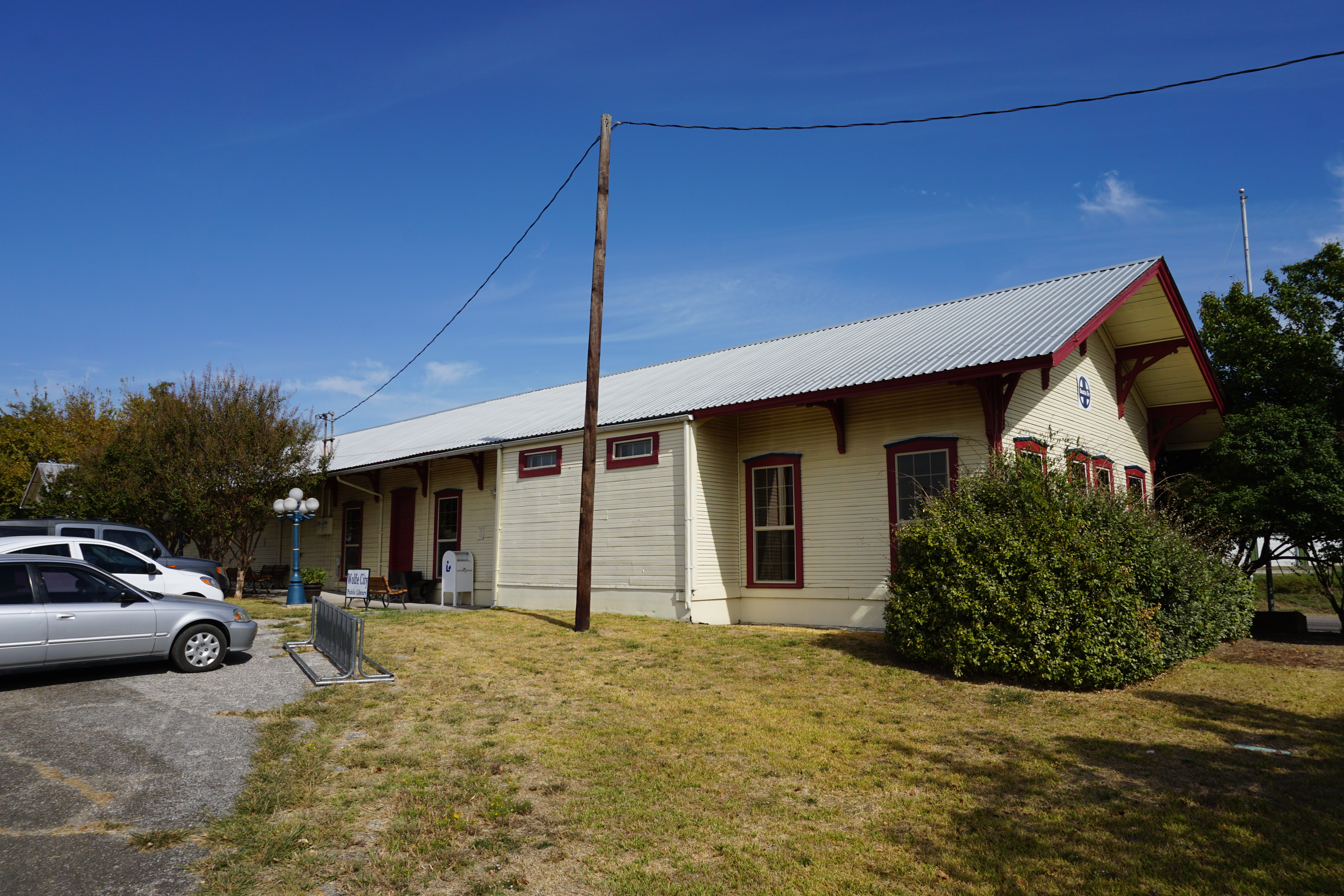
Wolfe City Public Library

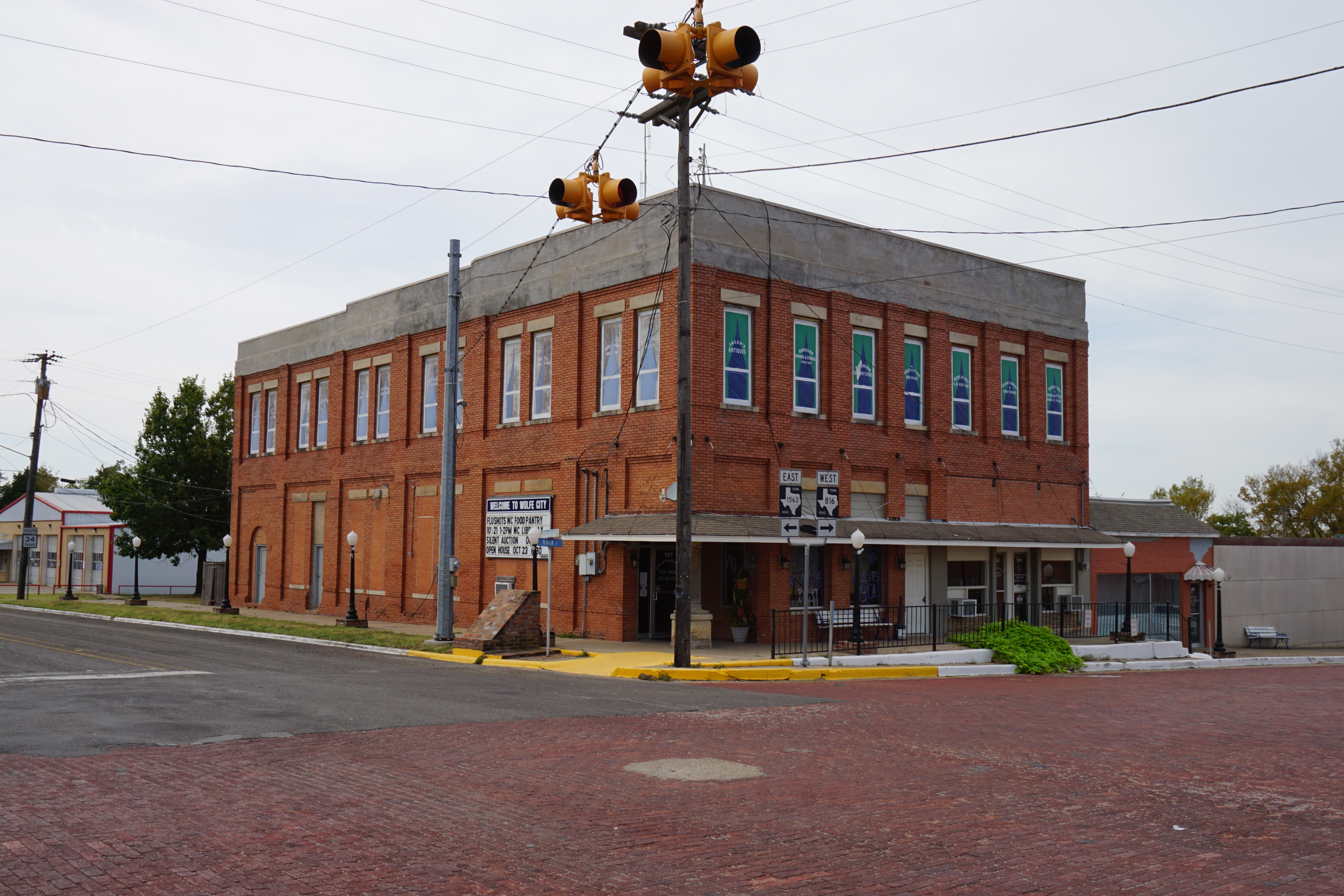
City Hall

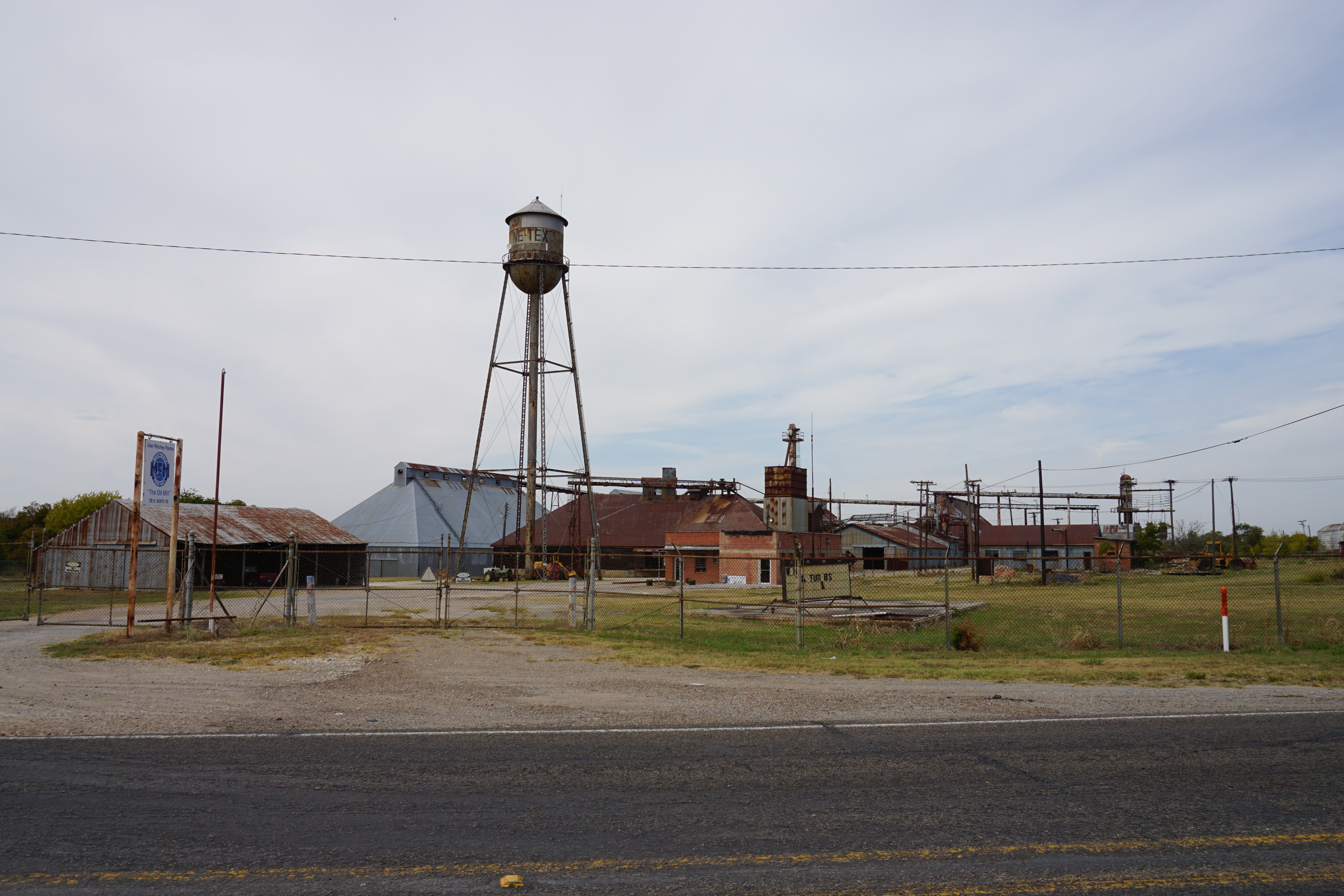
Martindale Feed Mill
