= Celeste, Texas =

- City
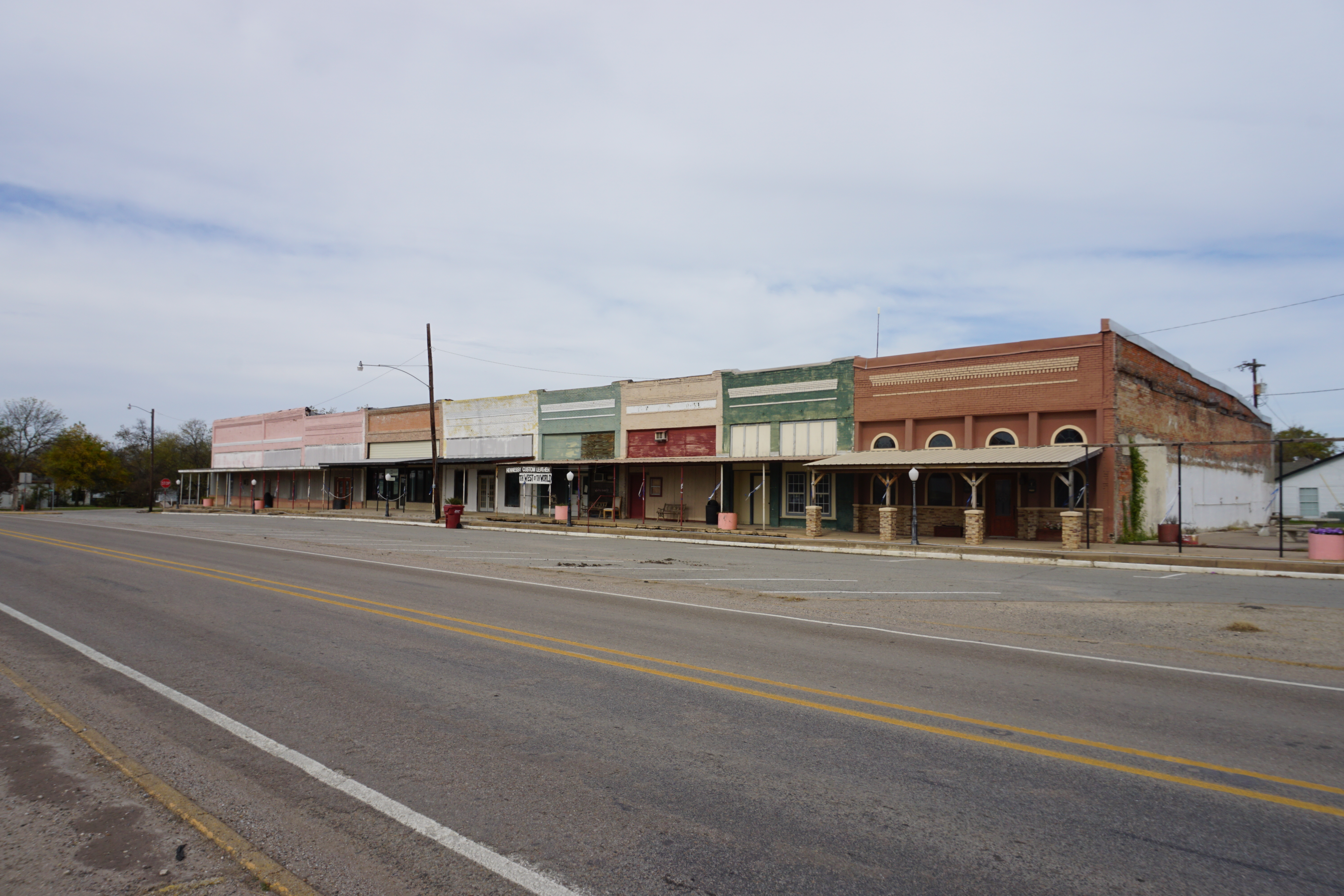
- U.S. Route 69 in Celeste

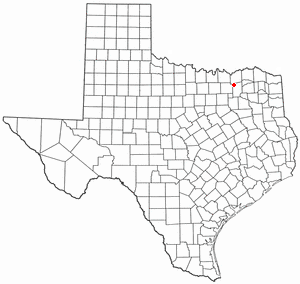
- Location of Celeste, Texas

- Coordinates: 33°17′23″N 96°11′40″W
- Country: United States
- State: Texas
- County: Hunt

Area
  - Total: 1.34 sq mi (3.48 km^{2})
  - Land: 1.34 sq mi (3.48 km^{2})
  - Water: 0 sq mi (0.00 km^{2})
- Elevation: 653 ft (199 m)

Population (2020)
  - Total: 809
  - Density: 602/sq mi (232/km^{2})
- Time zone: UTC-6 (Central (CST))
  - Summer (DST): UTC-5 (CDT)
- ZIP code: 75423
- Area codes: 903, 430
- FIPS code: 48-13672
- GNIS feature ID: 2409420
- Website: cityofceleste.org

Celeste (Light Blue, in Spanish) is a city in Hunt County, in the U.S. state of Texas. The population was 809 at the 2020 census.

== History ==
Like many towns in Hunt County, Celeste was a product of railroad development. The townsite was platted in 1886 by the Gulf, Colorado and Santa Fe Railway 3 miles (5 km) north of Kingston, on open prairie already crossed by the Missouri, Kansas and Texas line. This location was chosen in order to ensure that Kingston, whose elected officials had refused to offer incentives to attract the Gulf, Colorado and Santa Fe to build through their community, would be bypassed by the line as it put down tracks from Paris through Farmersville to Dallas.

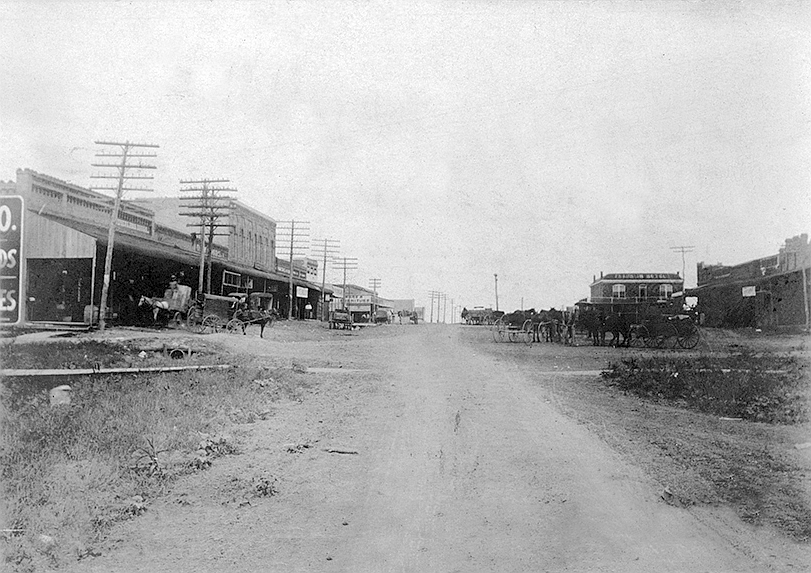
Sanger Street (circa 1905–09)

Celeste was named for the wife of a Santa Fe official. The two rail lines stimulated rapid growth. A post office opened in Celeste in 1886, and a number of merchants moved their businesses from Kingston to Celeste. By 1888 three churches were holding services in the settlement. The population by the mid-1890s stood at 600, and the community maintained three gristmills and cotton gins, a bank, a weekly newspaper, and a graded public school. Celeste was incorporated in 1900, and its population increased from 671 that year to 850 on the eve of World War I.

By 1914 the community had two banks, three cotton gins, a water works, an ice factory, and a weekly newspaper, as well as some thirty-five other businesses. It reported a population of 1,022 by 1926. Its high school and two elementary schools registered 500 students. Some fifty business establishments, including two banks and a newspaper, were in operation. After the 1920s, however, the population of Celeste fell from 803 in 1933 to 518 in the mid-1960s; businesses correspondingly declined, from thirty to sixteen. After the 1960s the town revived; in 1976 its population was 745. In 1982 the community, where World War II hero Audie Murphy once lived, had a bank, four churches, ten stores, and a school that enrolled 300 students. The population was 733 in 1990 and 817 in 2010.

== Geography ==
Celeste is in northwestern Hunt County along U.S. Route 69, which leads northwest 40 miles (64 km) to Denison and southeast 12 miles (19 km) to Greenville the Hunt county seat. According to the United States Census Bureau, Celeste has a total area of 1.1 square miles (2.9 km^{2}), all land.

== Demographics ==
Historical population
Census	Pop.	Note	%±
1890	250		—
1900	671		168.4%
1910	821		22.4%
1920	1,022		24.5%
1930	803		−21.4%
1940	730		−9.1%
1950	729		−0.1%
1960	588		−19.3%
1970	736		25.2%
1980	716		−2.7%
1990	733		2.4%
2000	817		11.5%
2010	814		−0.4%
2020	809		−0.6%
U.S. Decennial Census

=== 2020 census ===
As of the 2020 census, Celeste had a population of 809. The median age was 32.0 years, with 27.6% of residents under the age of 18 and 10.9% of residents aged 65 or older. For every 100 females there were 95.4 males, and for every 100 females age 18 and over there were 92.1 males age 18 and over.

0% of residents lived in urban areas, while 100.0% lived in rural areas.

There were 293 households in Celeste, of which 46.8% had children under the age of 18 living in them. Of all households, 44.7% were married-couple households, 17.7% were households with a male householder and no spouse or partner present, and 31.1% were households with a female householder and no spouse or partner present. About 27.3% of all households were made up of individuals and 14.3% had someone living alone who was 65 years of age or older.

There were 338 housing units, of which 13.3% were vacant. Among occupied housing units, 63.5% were owner-occupied and 36.5% were renter-occupied. The homeowner vacancy rate was 3.6% and the rental vacancy rate was 4.4%.

Racial composition as of the 2020 census
Race	Percent
White	82.1%
Black or African American	4.2%
American Indian and Alaska Native	0.7%
Asian	0%
Native Hawaiian and Other Pacific Islander	0%
Some other race	2.6%
Two or more races	10.4%
Hispanic or Latino (of any race)	11.7%

== Education ==
The city is served by the Celeste Independent School District and is home to the Celeste High School Blue Devils.

== Notable people ==
- Clint Lorance (born 1984), Army officer convicted of second-degree murder for battlefield deaths; pardoned
- Audie Murphy, the most decorated soldier in World War II, was born 4.5 miles south of Celeste
