= Campbell Independent School District =

School district in Texas

Coordinates: 33.1509°N 95.9540°W

The Campbell Independent School District is a public school district based in Campbell, Texas, United States. The school has one building where the elementary kids (Pre-K to 5) are in one half and the Jh/High school (6-12) is in the other.

== Academic achievement ==
In 2011, the school district was rated "recognized" by the Texas Education Agency.

== Special programs ==
=== Athletics ===
The Campbell Indians compete in the following sports:

- Baseball
- Basketball
- Six-man football
- Golf
- Softball
- Tennis
- Track and Field

== See also ==
- List of school districts in Texas
