= Hunt County, Texas =

County in Texas, United States

- County
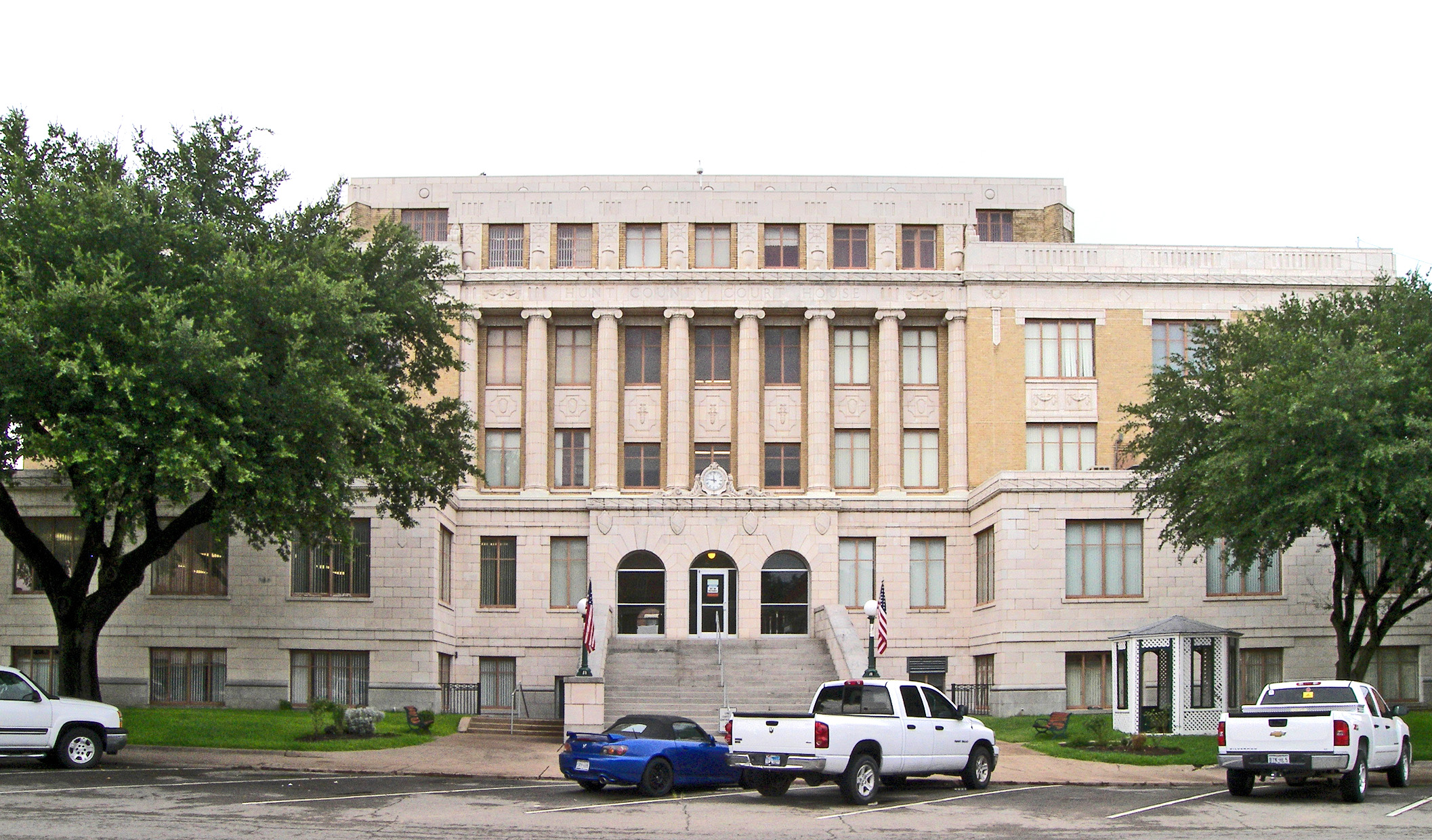
- The Hunt County Courthouse in Greenville

- Location within the U.S. state of Texas
- Coordinates: 33°07′N 96°05′W
- Country: United States
- State: Texas
- Founded: 1846
- Named for: Memucan Hunt, Jr.
- Seat: Greenville
- Largest city: Greenville

Area
  - Total: 882 sq mi (2,280 km^{2})
  - Land: 840 sq mi (2,200 km^{2})
  - Water: 42 sq mi (110 km^{2}) 4.7%

Population (2020)
  - Total: 99,956
  - Estimate (2025): 123,336 ▲
  - Density: 120/sq mi (46/km^{2})
- Time zone: UTC−6 (Central)
  - Summer (DST): UTC−5 (CDT)
- Congressional districts: 3rd, 4th
- Website: www.huntcounty.net

Hunt County is a county in the U.S. state of Texas. As of the 2020 census, its population was 99,956. Its county seat is Greenville. The county is named for Memucan Hunt, Jr., the first Republic of Texas minister to the United States from 1837 to 1838 and the third Texas secretary of the Navy from 1838 to 1839. Hunt County is located in Northeast Texas, at the eastern edge of the Dallas/Fort Worth Metroplex, and the western edge of East Texas.

== Geography ==
Hunt County is located in Northeast Texas, and by extension, a part of East Texas. Situated primarily in the Texas Blackland Prairies and the East Central Texas forests, the Piney Woods begin in the eastern portion of the county. According to the U.S. Census Bureau, the county has a total area of 882 square miles (2,280 km^{2}), of which 42 sq mi (110 km^{2}) (4.7%) are covered by water.

=== Lakes ===
- Lake Tawakoni

=== Major highways ===
- Interstate 30 / U.S. Highway 67
- U.S. Highway 69
- U.S. Highway 380
- State Highway 11
- State Highway 24
- State Highway 34
- State Highway 50
- State Highway 66
- State Highway 224
- State Highway 276
- Spur 137
- Spur 138
- Loop 178
- Spur 264
- Spur 302

=== Adjacent counties ===
- Fannin County (north)
- Delta County (northeast)
- Hopkins County (east)
- Rains County (southeast)
- Van Zandt County (southeast)
- Kaufman County (south)
- Rockwall County (southwest)
- Collin County (west)

== Communities ==
=== Cities ===
- Caddo Mills
- Campbell
- Celeste
- Commerce
- Farmersville (mostly in Collin County)
- Greenville (county seat)
- Hawk Cove
- Josephine (mainly in Collin County)
- Lone Oak
- Quinlan
- Royse City (mostly in Rockwall County and partly in Collin County)
- Union Valley
- West Tawakoni
- Wolfe City

=== Towns ===
- Neylandville
- Poetry (also in Kaufman County)

=== Unincorporated communities ===
- Cash
- Fairlie
- Floyd
- Jacobia
- Kingston
- Merit
- Mexico
- South Sulphur

== Demographics ==
Historical population
Census	Pop.	Note	%±
1850	1,520		—
1860	6,630		336.2%
1870	10,291		55.2%
1880	17,230		67.4%
1890	31,885		85.1%
1900	47,295		48.3%
1910	48,116		1.7%
1920	50,350		4.6%
1930	49,016		−2.6%
1940	48,793		−0.5%
1950	42,731		−12.4%
1960	39,399		−7.8%
1970	47,948		21.7%
1980	55,248		15.2%
1990	64,343		16.5%
2000	76,596		19.0%
2010	86,129		12.4%
2020	99,956		16.1%
2025 (est.)	123,336	▲	23.4%
U.S. Decennial Census; 1850–2010 2010–2020

=== Racial and ethnic composition ===
Hunt County, Texas – Racial and ethnic composition Note: the US Census treats Hispanic/Latino as an ethnic category. This table excludes Latinos from the racial categories and assigns them to a separate category. Hispanics/Latinos may be of any race.
Race / Ethnicity (NH = Non-Hispanic)	Pop 1980	Pop 1990	Pop 2000	Pop 2010	Pop 2020	% 1980	% 1990	% 2000	% 2010	% 2020
White alone (NH)	46,551	54,118	61,170	64,393	65,598	84.26%	84.11%	79.86%	74.76%	65.63%
Black or African American alone (NH)	6,918	6,736	7,183	6,976	7,812	12.52%	10.47%	9.38%	8.10%	7.82%
Native American or Alaska Native alone (NH)	174	253	478	600	722	0.31%	0.39%	0.62%	0.70%	0.72%
Asian alone (NH)	152	346	413	897	979	0.28%	0.54%	0.54%	1.04%	0.98%
Native Hawaiian or Pacific Islander alone (NH)	x	x	47	130	151	x	x	0.06%	0.15%	0.15%
Other race alone (NH)	132	14	54	58	301	0.24%	0.02%	0.07%	0.07%	0.30%
Mixed race or Multiracial (NH)	x	x	885	1,324	4,720	x	x	1.16%	1.54%	4.72%
Hispanic or Latino (any race)	1,321	2,876	6,366	11,751	19,673	2.39%	4.47%	8.31%	13.64%	19.68%
Total	55,248	64,343	76,596	86,129	99,956	100.00%	100.00%	100.00%	100.00%	100.00%

=== 2020 census ===
As of the 2020 census, the county had a population of 99,956. The median age was 37.7 years; 23.8% of residents were under 18 and 15.8% were 65 or older. For every 100 females, there were 97.4 males, and for every 100 females 18 and over, there were 95.0 males age 18 and over.

The racial makeup of the county was 70.6% White, 8.0% Black or African American, 1.3% American Indian and Alaska Native, 1.0% Asian, 0.2% Native Hawaiian and Pacific Islander, 7.4% from some other race, and 11.5% from two or more races. Hispanic or Latino residents of any race comprised 19.7% of the population.

About 38.7% of residents lived in urban areas, while 61.3% lived in rural areas.

Of the 36,076 households in the county, 33.7% had children under 18 living in them, 52.0% were married-couple households, 17.8% were households with a male householder and no spouse or partner present, and 24.1% were households with a female householder and no spouse or partner present. About 24.1% of all households were made up of individuals, and 10.2% had someone living alone who was 65 or older.

The county had 40,570 housing units, of which 11.1% were vacant. Among occupied housing units, 69.8% were owner-occupied and 30.2% were renter-occupied. The homeowner vacancy rate was 1.7% and the rental vacancy rate was 9.3%.

=== 2000 census ===
As of the 2000 census, 76,596 people, 28,742 households, and 20,521 families resided in the county. The population density was 91 people per square mile (35 people/km^{2}). The 32,490 housing units averaged 39 units per square mile (15/km^{2}). The racial makeup of the county was 83.57% White, 9.45% Black or African American, 0.73% Native American, 0.54% Asian, 0.07% Pacific Islander, 3.93% from other races, and 1.70% from two or more races. About 8.31% of the population were Hispanics or Latinos of any race.

Of the 28,742 households, 32.9% had children under 18 living with them, 56.2% were married couples living together, 11.0% had a female householder with no husband present, and 28.6% were not families; 24.1% of all households were made up of individuals, and 9.6% had someone living alone who was 65 or older. The average household size was 2.60 and the average family size was 3.08.

In the county, the age distribution was 26.5% under 18, 10.0% from 18 to 24, 28.0% from 25 to 44, 22.8% from 45 to 64, and 12.6% who were 65 or older. The median age was 36 years. For every 100 females, there were 98.1 males. For every 100 females 18 and over, there were 95.3 males.

The median income in the county for a household was $36,752 and for a family was $44,388. Males had a median income of $33,347 versus $23,085 for females. The per capita income for the county was $17,554. About 8.6% of families and 12.8% of the population were below the poverty line, including 15.8% of those under 18 and 11.7% of those 65 or over.

American Community Survey 2023 Data

The United States Census Bureau estimated that in 2023, Hunt County’s population was 113,347 of which by race were 22.2% Hispanic or Latino, 65.2% NH White, 8.3% NH Black, 1.5% NH Asian, 0.7% NH Native American, 0.1% NH Pacific Islander, and 2.0% NH multiracial.

== Media ==
Hunt County is part of the Dallas/Fort Worth DMA. Local media outlets are: KDFW-TV, KXAS-TV, WFAA-TV, KTVT-TV, KERA-TV, KTXA-TV, KDFI-TV, KDAF-TV, KFWD-TV, and KDTX-TV. Other nearby stations that provide coverage for Hunt County come from the Tyler/Longview/Jacksonville market, and they include: KLTV-TV, KYTX-TV, KFXK-TV, KCEB-TV, and KETK-TV. In addition to this, a radio station located at East Texas A&M University is called KETR and located on 88.9 FM on the radio. KETR is a 100,000-watt radio station that can reach up to 75 miles away; the station serves Commerce, East Texas A&M University, Hunt County, and surrounding cities. KGVL in Greenville is another radio station within the county. Two newspapers besides The Dallas Morning News circulate within the county. They are the Herald-Banner (Greenville) and the Commerce Journal (Commerce).

== Education ==
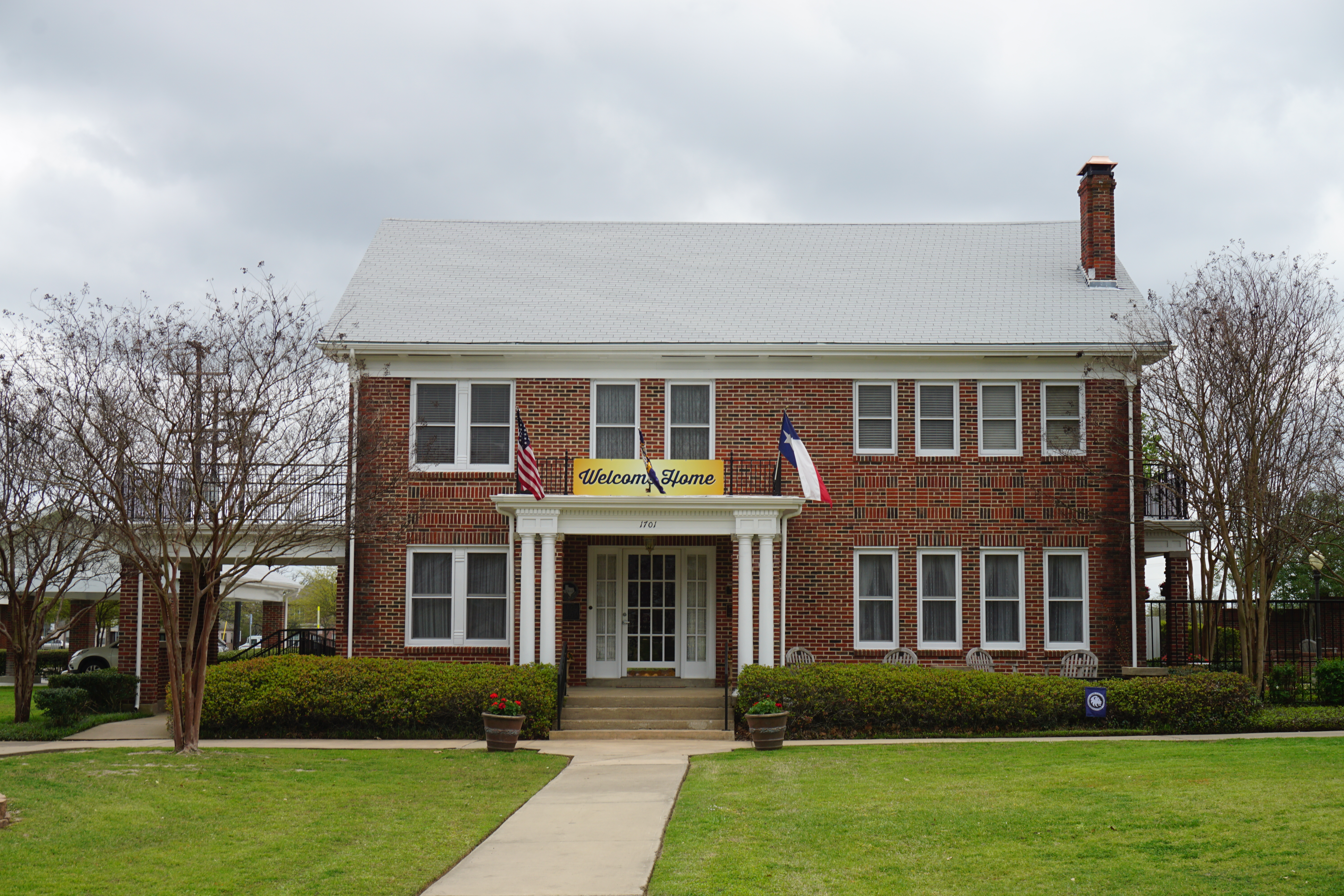
Heritage House on the campus of East Texas A&M University

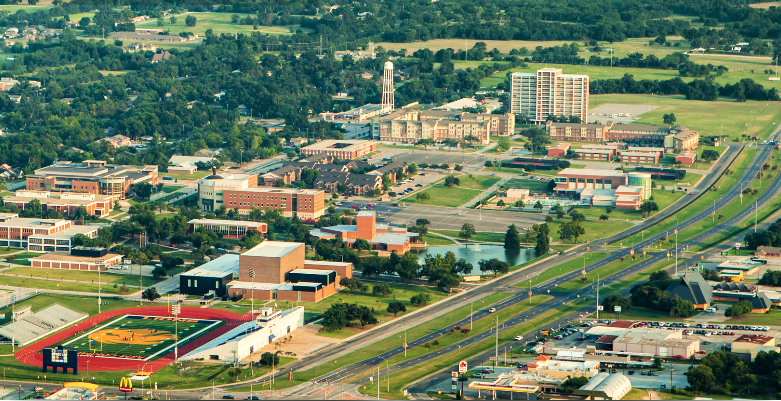
Aerial shot of East Texas A&M University

These school districts serve Hunt County:

- Bland ISD (small portion in Collin County)
- Boles ISD
- Caddo Mills ISD
- Campbell ISD
- Celeste ISD
- Commerce ISD (small portion in Delta County)
- Community ISD (mostly in Collin County)
- Cooper ISD (mostly in Delta County)
- Cumby ISD (mostly in Hopkins County)
- Fannindel ISD (mostly in Fannin County; small portion in Delta, Lamar counties)
- Greenville ISD
- Leonard ISD (mostly in Fannin County, small portion in Collin County)
- Lone Oak ISD (small portion in Rains County)
- Quinlan ISD
- Rains ISD (very small portion)
- Royse City ISD (mostly in Rockwall County, small portion in Collin County)
- Terrell ISD (mostly in Kaufman County)
- Wolfe City ISD (small portion in Fannin County)

In addition, East Texas A&M University and Paris Junior College-Greenville Center are located within the county.

== Top employers ==
#	Employer	# of Employees	Location
1	L3Harris Technologies	6,400	Greenville
T-2	East Texas A&M University	900	Commerce
T-2	Walmart	900*	Commerce, Greenville, Quinlan
4	Greenville Independent School District	702	Greenville
5	Hunt Regional Medical Center	1200*	Greenville, Commerce, Quinlan

Note*: A rough estimate of the four combined Walmarts in Hunt County in the cities of Greenville (two: one supercenter and one neighborhood market), Commerce (one supercenter), and Quinlan (one supercenter). In 2020 HRMC full-time employees has grown to over 1200 people.

== Public transportation ==
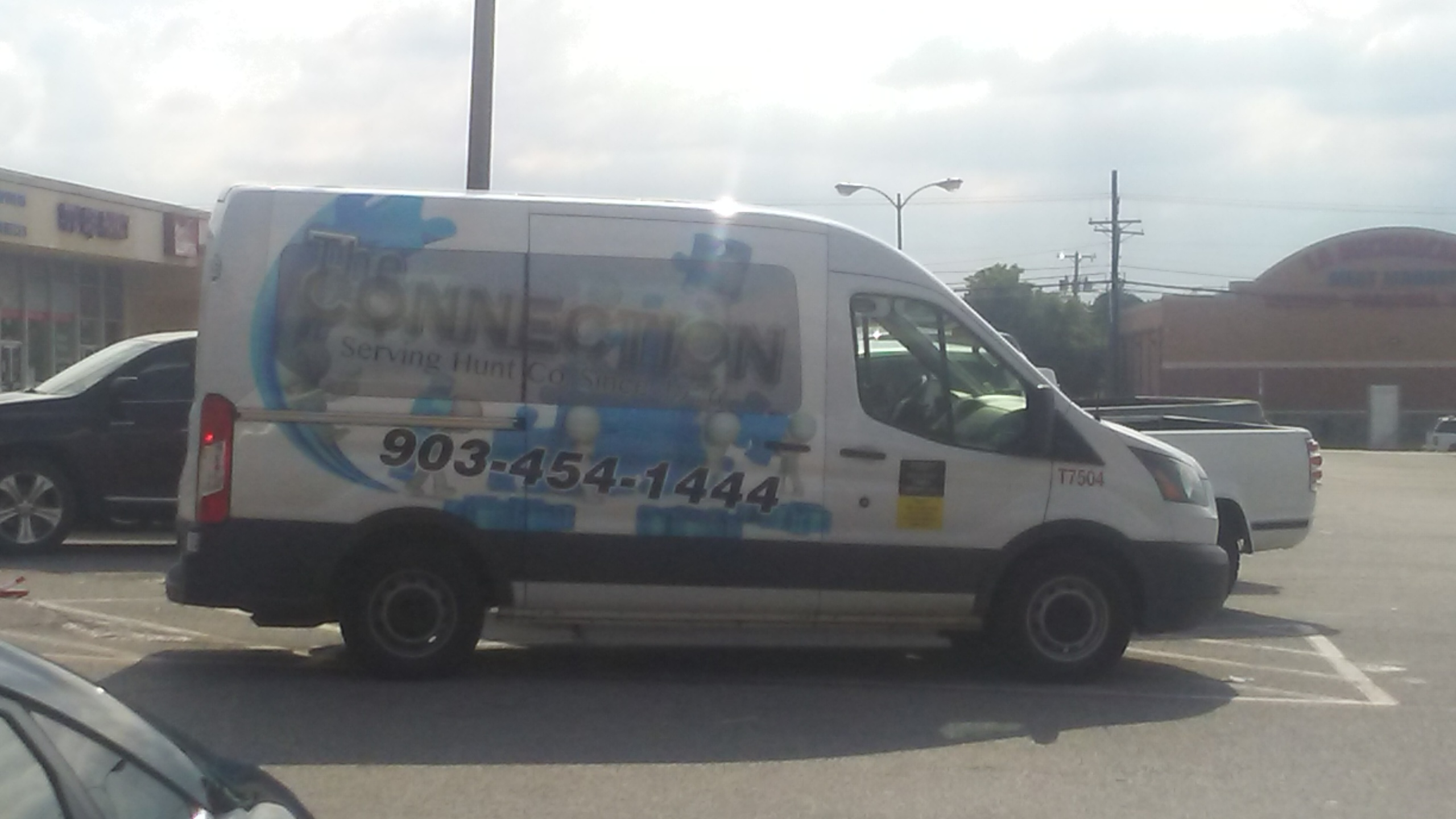
A Connection bus in Greenville

A public transit called the Connection serves all of Hunt County. The transit operates Monday through Friday from 7 am to 7 pm. Reservations have to be made one day in advance and the transit charges $2 ($4 round trip) if the passenger is traveling to a place within the same community or city, and $3 ($6 round trip) if the passenger is traveling from one city or community to another within Hunt County. Also, the transit will take Hunt County residents to Dallas; this is offered round-trip only, passengers are charged $34, and a minimum of three passengers is also required.

== Medical services ==
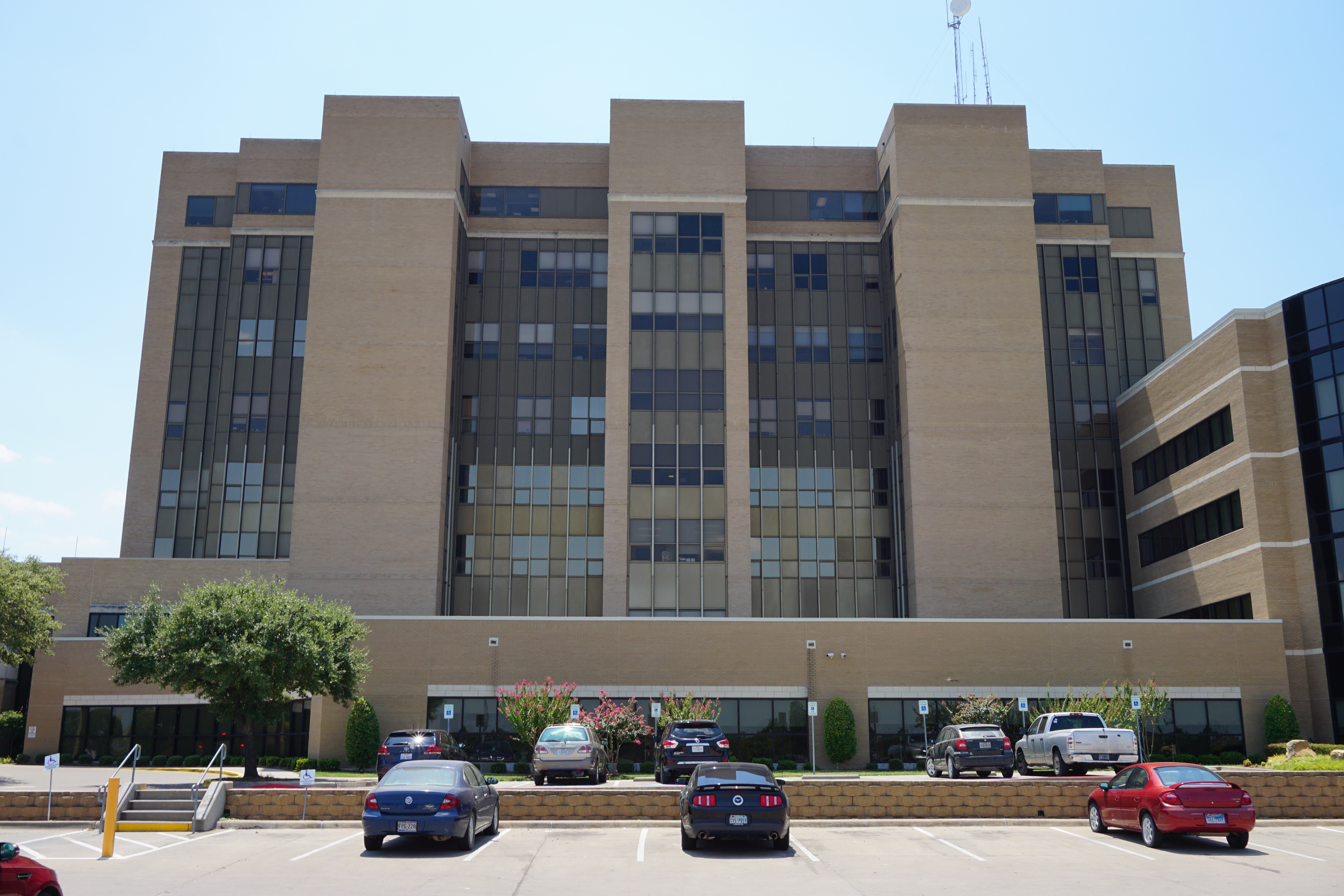
Hunt Regional Medical Center in Greenville

Hunt County's medical needs are primarily served by Hunt Regional Healthcare, with the Hunt Regional Medical Center located in Greenville being the largest hospital in the county.

== Veterans services ==
The Disabled American Veterans, Chapter 81, located at 2502 Church Street, offers veterans and their dependents a meeting place and assistance with filing and mailing disability forms.

The American Legion Otho Morgan Post 17 meets at 4509 Moulton St., Greenville, TX 75401

The Veterans of Foreign Wars Dean Hallmark Post 4011 meets at 5200 Wellington St., Greenville, TX 75402

== Notable people ==
- Waggoner Carr, Texas state representative and attorney general
- Audie Murphy, World War II soldier and Medal of Honor recipient
- Bart Millard, singer

== Politics ==
Hunt County is located within District 2 of the Texas House of Representatives. Hunt County is located within District 8 of the Texas Senate.

United States presidential election results for Hunt County, Texas
Year	Republican		Democratic		Third party(ies)	
Year	No.	%	No.	%	No.	%
1912	225	5.28%	3,410	80.05%	625	14.67%
1916	424	8.76%	4,242	87.68%	172	3.56%
1920	880	15.20%	4,397	75.97%	511	8.83%
1924	836	10.70%	6,828	87.43%	146	1.87%
1928	3,009	46.16%	3,510	53.84%	0	0.00%
1932	465	6.34%	6,856	93.41%	19	0.26%
1936	335	5.45%	5,801	94.37%	11	0.18%
1940	877	9.70%	8,156	90.18%	11	0.12%
1944	714	8.88%	6,200	77.14%	1,123	13.97%
1948	1,195	16.91%	5,082	71.91%	790	11.18%
1952	5,614	53.06%	4,953	46.81%	14	0.13%
1956	4,508	52.47%	4,051	47.15%	33	0.38%
1960	4,084	49.55%	4,116	49.94%	42	0.51%
1964	3,302	33.42%	6,567	66.47%	10	0.10%
1968	4,651	36.04%	4,785	37.08%	3,469	26.88%
1972	9,535	72.02%	3,655	27.61%	49	0.37%
1976	6,676	43.59%	8,543	55.79%	95	0.62%
1980	9,283	50.18%	8,773	47.42%	445	2.41%
1984	14,303	67.08%	6,971	32.69%	48	0.23%
1988	12,331	58.06%	8,820	41.53%	87	0.41%
1992	9,739	39.51%	7,452	30.23%	7,459	30.26%
1996	10,746	49.12%	8,801	40.23%	2,329	10.65%
2000	16,177	66.12%	7,857	32.11%	432	1.77%
2004	20,065	71.17%	7,971	28.27%	158	0.56%
2008	20,573	69.68%	8,594	29.11%	357	1.21%
2012	21,011	74.91%	6,671	23.78%	367	1.31%
2016	23,910	75.77%	6,396	20.27%	1,248	3.96%
2020	29,163	75.56%	8,906	23.07%	528	1.37%
2024	36,137	77.33%	10,212	21.85%	384	0.82%

United States Senate election results for Hunt County, Texas1
Year	Republican		Democratic		Third party(ies)	
Year	No.	%	No.	%	No.	%
2024	34,351	74.02%	11,067	23.85%	991	2.14%

United States Senate election results for Hunt County, Texas2
Year	Republican		Democratic		Third party(ies)	
Year	No.	%	No.	%	No.	%
2020	28,888	75.91%	8,319	21.86%	851	2.24%

Texas Gubernatorial election results for Hunt County
Year	Republican		Democratic		Third party(ies)	
Year	No.	%	No.	%	No.	%
2022	23,744	77.75%	6,422	21.03%	374	1.22%

== See also ==
- Audie Murphy American Cotton Museum
- List of museums in North Texas
- National Register of Historic Places listings in Hunt County, Texas
- Recorded Texas Historic Landmarks in Hunt County
