= Quinlan Independent School District =

School district in Texas, United States

Quinlan Independent School District is a public school district based in Quinlan, Texas (USA).

In addition to Quinlan, the district serves the towns of West Tawakoni and Hawk Cove, most of Union Valley, as well as rural areas in southern Hunt County. A small portion of northern Kaufman County also lies within the district. The district covers a total area of 152 square miles (390 km^{2}). The student population is approximately 2,600 (68% Anglo, 27% Hispanic, 2% African-American, <1% Asian, and <1% Native American). QISD has five campuses (two elementary, one middle/junior high school, one high school, and one alternative) as well as various support facilities. QISD's mascot is the panther, and the school colors are blue and white.

For the 2022–23 school year, the district was rated by the Texas Education Agency as follows: 74 (C) overall, 71 (C) for Student Achievement, 76 (C) for School Progress, and 69 (D) for Closing the Gaps.

== Schools ==
- Ford High School (Grades 9-12)
- Thompson Middle School (Grades 6-8)
- Butler Intermediate School (Grades 3-5)
- Cannon Elementary School (Grades PK-2)

== Additional facilities ==
- Alternative Learning Center (In-School Suspension Classes and Credit Recovery Programs)
- Quinlan Education Center (Free Public Library, Fitness Center, and Community Education Classes)
