= Boles Independent School District =

School district in Texas

Location
- Hunt County, Texas ESC Region 10 USA
- Coordinates: 32°56′51″N 96°06′05″W

District information
- Type: Independent school district
- Grades: Pre-K through 12
- Superintendent: Mikayle Goss
- Schools: 3 (2009-10)
- NCES District ID: 4810740

Students and staff
- Students: 530 (2010-11)
- Teachers: 50.91 (2009-10) (on full-time equivalent (FTE) basis)
- Student–teacher ratio: 10.39 (2009-10)
- Athletic conference: UIL Class 2A Football Division I
- District mascot: Hornets
- Colors: Forest Green, Black, White

Other information
- TEA District Accountability Rating for 2011-12: Recognized
- Website: www.bolesisd.com

Boles Independent School District is a public school district in unincorporated Hunt County, Texas (USA), near Quinlan. The district operates one high school, Boles High School.

== General information ==
The district, founded in 1985, primarily serves Boles Children's Home, and was known as Boles Home Independent School District before the name change. Today, the district serves the common public and is not only a children's home any longer.

The campus' fiber optic networking allows access to the Internet and the capability to extend that service to the Boles Children's Home. Thus, the community is linked to the school via fiber. The district offers distance education courses and training through Region X Educational Service Center. The district is linked directly via T-1 to Texas A&M – Commerce and several other school districts through ET-LINC.

== Location and geography ==
The 36,700-acre (14,900 ha) territory of Boles ISD brushes along Lake Tawakoni. The Boles ISD campus is near the intersection of Texas State Highway 34 and Farm to Market Road 2101, 3 miles (4.8 km) north of Quinlan and 35 miles (56 km) east of Dallas. The Texas A&M University-Commerce is 33 miles (53 km) away from the Boles campus.

== Finances ==
As of the 2010-2011 school year, the appraised valuation of property in the district was $16,435,000. The maintenance tax rate was $0.117 and the bond tax rate was $0.035 per $100 of appraised valuation.

== Academic achievement ==
In 2011, the school district was rated "recognized" by the Texas Education Agency. Thirty-five percent of districts in Texas in 2011 received the same rating. No state accountability ratings will be given to districts in 2012. A school district in Texas can receive one of four possible rankings from the Texas Education Agency: Exemplary (the highest possible ranking), Recognized, Academically Acceptable, and Academically Unacceptable (the lowest possible ranking).

Historical district TEA accountability ratings

- 2011: Recognized
- 2010: Recognized
- 2009: Recognized
- 2008: Recognized
- 2007: Recognized
- 2006: Recognized
- 2005: Academically Acceptable
- 2004: Academically Acceptable

== Schools ==
Boles ISD operates three schools:

- Boles High School (Grades 9–12)
- Boles Middle School (Grades 5–8)
- Boles Elementary School (Grades PK-4)

== Special programs ==
=== Athletics ===
The Boles Hornets compete in the following sports:

Cross Country, Volleyball, Football, Basketball, Track and Field, and Golf

== See also ==
- List of school districts in Texas
- List of high schools in Texas
