= 3-Way (disambiguation) =

3-Way is a block cipher.

3-Way, 3Way, three-way, or three way may also refer to:

- 3WAY, Australian community radio station
- Three-way or threesome, three people having sexual intercourse together
- Three Way, Tennessee, a city in Madison County
- Three Way, Texas, a small unincorporated community in Erath County
- 3-way junction, road junction type
- 3Way International Logistics, a freight forwarding company in Ontario
- Cincinnati chili Three-way, a serving variant of Cincinnati-style chili

== Popular culture ==
- "Three-Way" (CSI: Miami), 2005 CSI: Miami episode
- Three Way (film), a 2004 film based on Gil Brewer's 1963 pulp novel Wild to Possess
- Three Way (opera), a 2016 opera with music by Robert Paterson (composer) and a libretto by David Cote
- "3-Way (The Golden Rule)", a 2011 song and short video from Saturday Night Live
- 3 Way (web series), starring Maeve Quinlan and Kristy Swanson

== Technology ==
- 3-way speaker, loudspeaker system with low, medium and high frequency drivers
- 3-way switch, interconnected electrical switches to control an electrical load
- 3-way bulb, incandescent light bulb with two filaments and three light settings
- Three-way calling, a telephone call involving two called parties
- Three-way handshake, a process in Transmission Control Protocol connecting a client and a server
- Three-way comparison, in computer science, comparison of the values of two quantities in a single operation

== See also ==
- Ménage à Trois (disambiguation)
- Party line (disambiguation)
- Two-way (disambiguation)
