= KSTV =

KSTV may refer to:

- KSTV (AM), a radio station (1510 AM) licensed to serve Stephenville, Texas, United States
- KSTV-FM, a radio station (93.1 FM) licensed to serve Dublin, Texas
- KSTV-LD, a low-power television station (channel 32) licensed to serve Sacramento, California, United States
