= KCOM =

- Comanche, Texas; United States
- Broadcast area: Brownwood, Texas
- Frequency: 1550 kHz
- Branding: Comanche Country

Programming
- Format: News

Ownership
- Owner: Robert Elliott Jr.; (Villecom LLC)
- Sister stations: KYOX

History
- First air date: October 1998
- Call sign meaning: COManche

Technical information
- Licensing authority: FCC
- Facility ID: 2866
- Class: D
- Power: 250 watts (day); 54 watts (night)
- Transmitter coordinates: 31°53′54″N 98°35′14″W
- Translators: K261EZ (100.1 MHz, Comanche)

Links
- Public license information: Public file; LMS
- Website: https://www.kcomradio.com/

KCOM (1550 AM) is a radio station licensed to serve Comanche, Texas, United States. The station is owned by Robert Elliott Jr., and the license is held by Villecom LLC.

== History ==
In October 1998, Arrowhead Broadcasting, Inc., reached an agreement to sell this station to Texas West Media, Inc. The deal was approved by the FCC on December 10, 1998, and the transaction was consummated on February 1, 1999.

In February 2005, Texas West Media, Inc. (David B. Bacon, president/director) reached an agreement to sell this station to Cherry Creek Radio (Joseph D. Schwartz, CEO/president), through their CCR-Stephenville III, LLC, holding company, for a reported sale price of $164,000. The deal was approved by the FCC on August 2, 2005, and the transaction was consummated on September 30, 2005. At the time of the sale, the station aired a country music format.

Effective November 6, 2015, KCOM (along with co-owned KSTV, KSTV-FM, and KYOX) was sold to Robert Elliott, Jr.'s Villecom LLC for $1.11 million.
