= Jim Spruill =

American basketball and football player (1923–2006)

Personal information
- Born: February 26, 1923 Dublin, Texas, U.S.
- Died: January 8, 2006 (aged 82) Boulder City, Nevada, U.S.
- Listed height: 6 ft 2 in (1.88 m)
- Listed weight: 225 lb (102 kg)

Career information
- High school: Dublin (Dublin, Texas)
- College: Rice (1941–1943, 1946–1948)
- BAA draft: 1948: undrafted
- Position: Guard

Career history
- 1948: Indianapolis Jets
- Stats at NBA.com
- Stats at Basketball Reference

James Winfred Spruill (February 26, 1923 – January 8, 2006) was an American professional basketball and football player.

== Early life ==
Spruill was born in Dublin, Texas, to Clint and Addie Spruill. He first played football at Dublin High School, where he earned four letters and All-District honours as a tailback.

== College career ==
Spruill won a basketball scholarship to Rice University where he also played college football.

== Professional career ==
Following his graduation, Spruill played professional football for the Baltimore Colts of the All-America Football Conference in the 1948 and 1949 seasons. He played in 26 total games, starting 15.

Spruill also played in the Basketball Association of America for the Indianapolis Jets in just one game during the 1948–49 BAA season. In that game he scored two points and recorded three personal fouls. He was recommended to Jets coach Burl Friddle by Colts coach Cecil Isbell.

== Coaching career ==
In 1951, Spruill became a high school football coach at Silsbee, Texas. He later coached at Durango High School in Durango, Colorado, Amphitheater High School in Tucson, Arizona, and Lompoc High School in Lompoc, California. He coached football at LHS from 1965 to 1974 before serving as athletic director until 1981.

Spruill died in 2006 at Boulder City, Nevada, at age 82.

== BAA career statistics ==
Legend
GP	Games played
FG%	Field-goal percentage
FT%	Free-throw percentage
APG	Assists per game
PPG	Points per game

=== Regular season ===
Year	Team	GP	FG%	FT%	APG	PPG
1948–49	Indianapolis	1	.333	.000	.0	2.0
Career		1	.333	.000	.0	2.0
