= Dick Stevens =

American football player (1948–2026)

Profile
- Position: Offensive tackle

Personal information
- Born: February 23, 1948; Dublin, Texas, U.S.
- Died: August 17, 2024 (aged 76)
- Listed height: 6 ft 4 in (1.93 m)
- Listed weight: 240 lb (109 kg)

Career information
- High school: Dublin
- College: Baylor
- NFL draft: 1970: 13th round, 318th overall pick

Career history
- Philadelphia Eagles (1970–1974)

Awards and highlights
- First-team All-SWC (1968)

Career NFL statistics
- Games played: 60
- Games started: 2
- Stats at Pro Football Reference

Richard "Truck" Stevens (February 23, 1948 – August 17, 2024) was an American professional football player who was an offensive tackle for five seasons with the Philadelphia Eagles of the National Football League (NFL). He played college football for the Baylor Bears.

== Early life ==
Stevens was born and raised in Dublin, Texas, where he attended Dublin High School. He was named All-District at both end and defensive tackle for three consecutive seasons and was named All-State and an All-American as a senior. Stevens was recruited by every school in the Southwest Conference and opted to play at Baylor University, where his uncle Gordon Hollon had played.

== College career ==
Stevens played defensive tackle on Baylor's freshman team before moving to offensive tackle. In his three years as a letterman, the Bears won four total games. Stevens was a unanimous All-SWC selection as a junior and was named a preseason All-American going into his senior year. He missed part of his senior season due to a knee injury. Stevens was inducted into the Baylor Athletic Hall of Fame in 2014.

== Professional career ==
Stevens was selected 318th overall in the 13th round of the 1970 NFL draft by the Philadelphia Eagles. He was a member of the team for five seasons, playing all three offensive line positions and serving as the special teams captain, before retiring due to knee injuries. Between his three seasons at Baylor and five seasons with the Eagles, Stevens' teams never finished with a winning record.

== Personal life and death ==
Following his football career, Stevens worked at Bank of America in various management roles. Stevens died from complications of CTE, dementia and Parkinson's disease on August 17, 2024, at the age of 78.
