= Huckabay Independent School District =

School district in Texas, United States

Address
- 200 County Rd 421 Stephenville, Erath County, Texas, 76401; United States

District information
- Type: Public, independent school district
- Grades: PK-12
- Superintendent: Troy Roberts
- Governing agency: Texas Education Agency, Region 11
- Schools: 1
- Budget: $1.97 million (2015-2016)
- NCES District ID: 4823760

Students and staff
- Students: 237 (2017-2018)
- Teachers: 20 (2017-2018)
- Staff: 33.41 (2017-2018)

Other information
- Website: www.hisd.us

Huckabay School
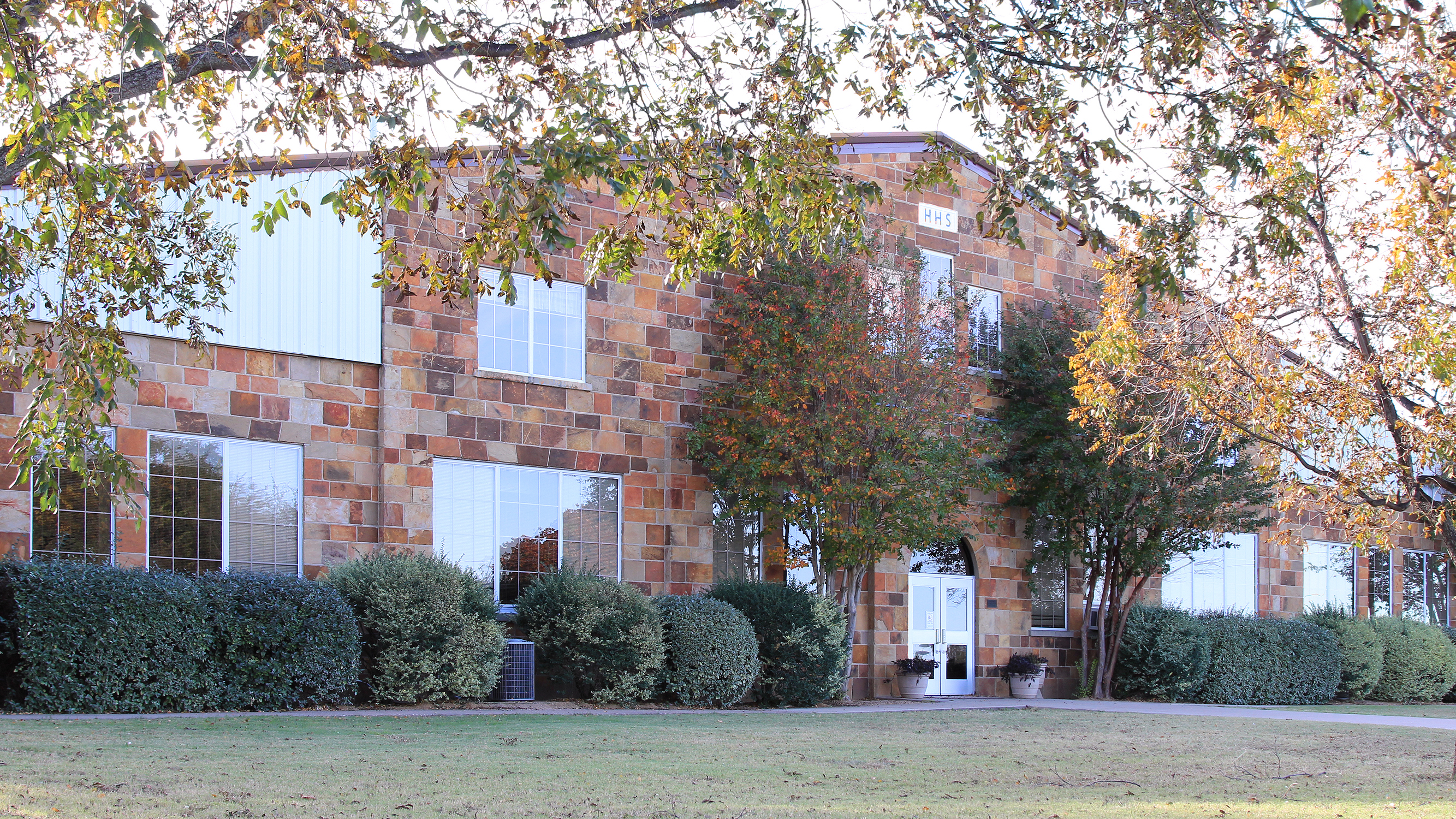

Location
- 200 CR 421; Stephenville, Texas 76401-6429; United States; 32.343617°N 98.301874°W

Information
- School type: Public high school
- School district: Huckabay Independent School District
- Superintendent: Troy Roberts
- Principal: Wes Corzine
- Grades: PK-12
- Enrollment: 241 (2018-2019)
- Colors: Blue & Gold
- Athletics conference: UIL Class A
- Mascot: Indian
- Website: Huckabay High School

The Huckabay Independent School District is a public school district based in the community of Huckabay, Texas, United States. The district has one school, Huckabay School, that serves students in prekindergarten through grade 12. The district is in northern Erath County.

In 2009, the school district was rated "academically acceptable" by the Texas Education Agency.

It classified as a 1A school by the UIL. Since Huckabay no longer has a post office, the school is addressed to Stephenville. In 2018, the school was scored 94 of 100 points, earning an A rating, according to the accountability ratings system used by the Texas Education Agency.

== History ==
The education of Flat Wood's younger citizens began in the summers of 1876 and 1877. John Copeland first taught the children during the summers in his log cabin home. After two summers, the settlers came together and built a log school. Jim Smith, Sarah Harrison, George Clark, and George Gressom were some of the earliest teachers of the newly built tuition-based school. A Stephenville Empire Tribune article from February 7, 1908, reported that the log school was furnished with benches made of split logs, which were supported with pegs for legs. A three-room box house replaced the log school after more than 15 years of use.

As time went on, Flat Wood grew, and the old box house became overcrowded – Marshall Welch built a two-story, six-room structure to replace the box house. Folding partitions allowed the three top rooms to be opened into one large auditorium. Modern equipment was also installed. The estimated cost of the school was about $3,500.

In 1926, the frame building burned, and the community replaced it with a $26,000 brick building, with a building for the primary grades, a workshop, and a new home economics building. The new brick school expanded its library in 1934 when Thurber High School dissolved. According to Geraldine Griswold, in 1937, 250 students attended Huckabay, who were taught by nine teachers. The school also had four bus routes. In 1942, this brick building burned.

The current school building is a Works Progress Administration-constructed concrete building off of Texas State Highway 108. The original two-story building features a plaque dated 1938–1940 (Geraldine Griswold, however, reports that 1942 is more accurate). Originally, a barracks building housed the cafeteria and home economics - a purpose-built structure was built in 1954. During this time, enrollment plummeted. The school appeared headed for consolidation until the school added 21 students from the Soul Clinic commune in December 1953. In 1965, a building for the elementary school side was completed, costing $34,990. That building currently consists of a computer lab, the library, a workroom, and the school counselor's office. In 1983, an additional building was added for administration and agriculture. Four classrooms were built in 1993–1994.

Recent superintendents have been: Wes Corzine - 2022–present, Troy Roberts - 2016–2022, Cheryl Floyd - 2002–2016, Charles Luke - 2000–2002, and Arley Echols - 1990–2000.

== Students ==
=== Demographics ===
In the 2018–2019 school year, the school district had a total of 236 students, ranging from prekindergarten through grade 12. The class of 2018 included 13 graduates; the annual drop-out rate across grades 9-12 was reported as 0.0%.

As of the 2018–2019 school year, the ethnic distribution of the school district was 78.4% White, 17.4% Hispanic, 1.3% American Indian, 0.4% Asian, and 2.5% from two or more races; no Pacific Islander or African American students were reported. Economically disadvantaged students made up 31.8% of the student body.

== Controversy ==
In July 2024, the ACLU of Texas sent Huckabay Independent School District a letter, alleging that the district's 2023-2024 dress and grooming code appeared to violate the Texas CROWN Act, a state law which prohibits racial discrimination based on hair texture or styles, and asking the district to revise its policies for the 2024–2025 school year.

== Athletics ==
The Huckabay Indians compete in these sports:

- Basketball
- Cross-country running
- Golf
- Track and field
