= H. Lane Mitchell =

American politician

Henry Lane Mitchell
- Mitchell in his American Legion cap

Public Works Commissioner in Shreveport, Louisiana
- In office 1934 – December 31, 1968

Personal details
- Born: August 17, 1895 Dublin, Erath County, Texas, USA
- Died: November 8, 1978 (aged 83) Shreveport, Caddo Parish; Louisiana
- Resting place: St. Joseph Cemetery in Shreveport
- Party: Democratic
- Spouse: Lillian O'Brien Mitchell
- Children: Robert Lane Mitchell; Six grandchildren
- Education: Valparaiso University
- Occupation: Civil engineer

Military service
- Branch/service: United States Army
- Battles/wars: World War I

Henry Lane Mitchell, known as H. Lane Mitchell (August 17, 1895 – November 8, 1978), was a civil engineer who served from 1934 to 1968 as the elected citywide public works commissioner in his adopted city of Shreveport, Louisiana. Hailed during his tenure as a popular success, his life after retirement was marred by legal troubles which led to his imprisonment upon conviction of theft of multiple city properties under his domain.
