= KCLE (disambiguation) =

KCLE may refer to:

- KCLE, a radio station (1460 AM) licensed to Burleson, Texas, United States
- KHFX, a radio station (1140 AM) licensed to Cleburne, Texas, United States, which held the call sign KCLE until September 2008
- KTRL (FM), a radio station (90.5 FM) licensed to Stephenville, Texas, United States, which held the call sign KCLE-FM from August 2008 to September 2008
- KTFW-FM, a radio station (92.1 FM) licensed to Glen Rose, Texas, United States, which held the call sign KCLE-FM from August 1993 to April 1998
- the ICAO code for Cleveland-Hopkins International Airport
