= Clairette, Texas =

Unincorporated community in Texas, US

Clairette
- Unincorporated community
- Location within Texas Location within the United States
- Coordinates: 32°02′22″N 98°07′08″W
- Country: United States
- State: Texas
- County: Erath

Clairette is an unincorporated community located in Erath County in Central Texas, United States.

Clairette is situated in the southern part of the county along Texas State Highway 6 and the Bosque River, five miles northwest of Hico, and 16 miles to the east of Dublin.

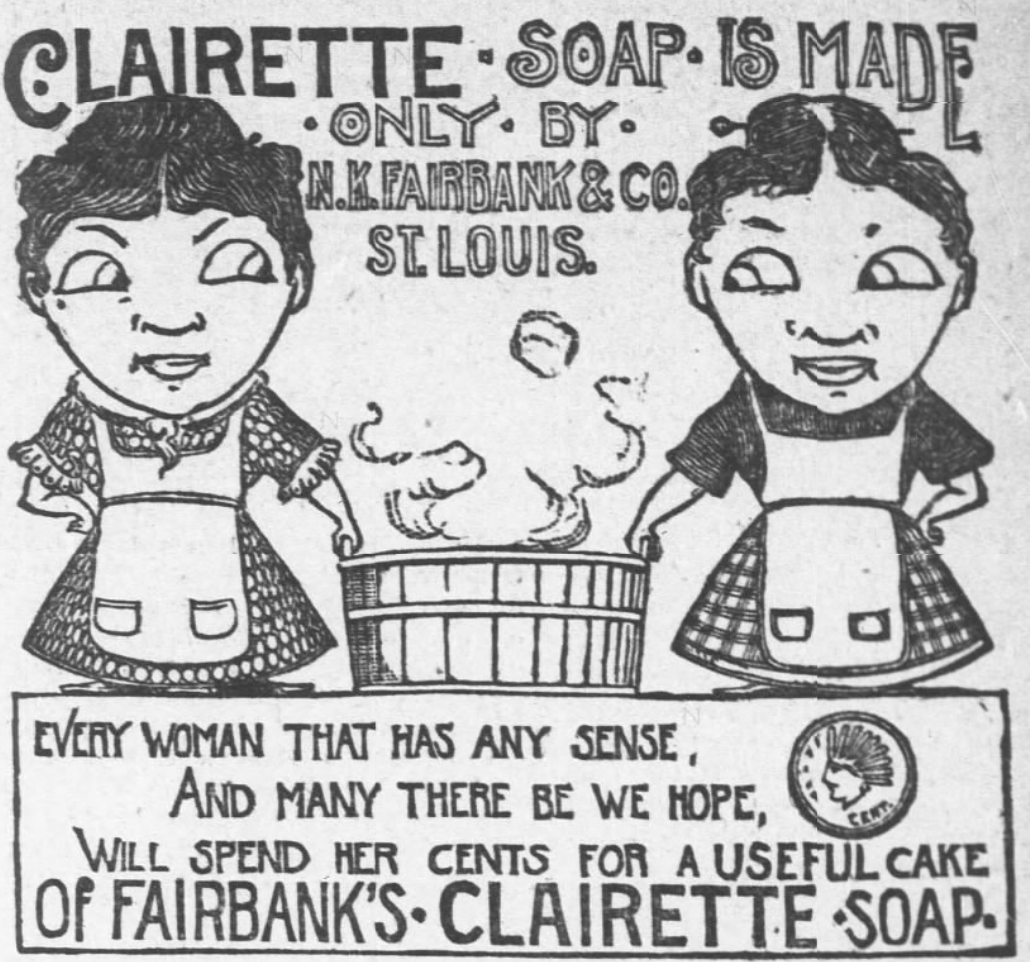
An 1891 ad for the soap brand that inspired the town's name

== History ==
Clairette was founded during the 1880s when the Texas Central line, part of the historic Katy Railroad, was constructed through the townsite on its way from the Waco area to Stamford, with a branch to Cross Plains from the line at De Leon. The Katy abandoned the line through Clairette in the late 1960s. Clairette was named after a now defunct brand of soap that was popular at the time. At its peak, Clairette had a population of around 300; however, from the 1968 through 2000 Clairette's population remained at a steady 60. Clairette declined due to the removal of the railroad but also the construction of nearby US Highway 281 and the improvement of Texas State Highway 6, which allowed for easier commuting to larger nearby areas.

In 1940, Clairette had 275 residents, five businesses, several churches, and a post office. A 1984 county highway map showed that the community still had three businesses, a church, and a community hall.
