= Edna Hill, Texas =

Unincorporated community in Texas, US

Coordinates: 31°57′24″N 98°19′49″W

Edna Hill is an unincorporated community in Erath County, Texas, United States. The community is located in the extreme southwestern corner of the county along Fm-1702, approximately nine miles south of the City of Dublin in Central Texas.

== History ==
The first settlers of the area arrived around the 1850s. In the early 1900s, a school was opened in the community and from 1935 to 1940 Edna Hill consisted of the school, numerous homes, and two churches. In the last half of the 1940s, the Edna Hill School District consolidated with Dublin Schools. In the 1960s, Edna Hill's population was around 32, a figure which it remained steady from the late 1970s through the 2000s.

== School ==
Edna Hill is served by Dublin Public Schools.
