= Purves, Texas =

Unincorporated community in Texas, US

Coordinates: 32°00′13″N 98°16′13″W

Purves is an unincorporated community in Erath County, Texas, United States. Purves is located in the southwestern part of the county, along Fm-219 South, seven miles south of the City of Dublin.

The community was named for two local men named Purves, who started the Post Office and a church in the community around the 1890s. Circa 1900, the population had peaked at 117 residents. In 1907, the Purves Post Office was closed after only around 10 years of service. By the late 1940s, the population had dropped to approximately 95. At that time Purves was home to a school, two churches, and two businesses. In the 1980s, the community had a population of around 50, a figure that remained steady throughout the 1990s and the 2000s. The First Baptist Church of Purves continues to serve the community as of 2024.

== Education ==
The first school at Purves was named Field's School after G.C. & Elizabeth Field. Purves school came into being in 1899 when Field's school consolidated with Live Oak. Purves school consolidated with Dublin Public Schools in 1951.
