= Harbin (disambiguation) =

Harbin is the capital and largest city of Heilongjiang province, China.

Harbin may also refer to:

== Institutions and organizations ==
- Harbin Aircraft Manufacturing Corporation (HAMC)
- Harbin Clinic, a clinic-hospital in Rome, Georgia, U.S.
- Harbin Hot Springs, a non-profit holistic retreat and workshop center in Lake County, north of Napa Valley, California, U.S.
- Harbin Pharmaceutical Group Co., Ltd., China's second-biggest drug maker by market value.

== Architecture ==
- Saint Sophia Cathedral, former Russian Orthodox cathedral in Harbin converted into a museum in 1907.

== People ==
- Ben Harbin (1963–2025), American politician in Georgia
- John Harbin (born 1947), Australian sports coach
- Robert Harbin (1909–1978), British magician and author
- Sherry Harbin, American academic
- Suzette Harbin (1915–1994), African-American actress and dancer

== Places ==
U.S.

- Harbin, Georgia in Gwinnett County, Georgia
- Harbin, Tennessee in Roane County, Tennessee
- Harbin, Texas in Erath County
- Harbin Mountain, a mountain in Lake County, California

== Other ==
- Harbin (film), 2024 film by Woo Min-ho
- Harbin (elm cultivar), Chinese cultivar
- Harbin Beer, brewed by Harbin Brewery, China
- Harbin Ferris Wheel, in Harbin, China
- Harbin Hall, a building on the Georgetown University campus, Washington, D.C., U.S..
- Harbin Skull, an alternate name for a fossil skull of Homo longi.

== See also ==
- Harbine, Nebraska in Jefferson County, Nebraska
