= Dublin Independent School District =

School district in Texas

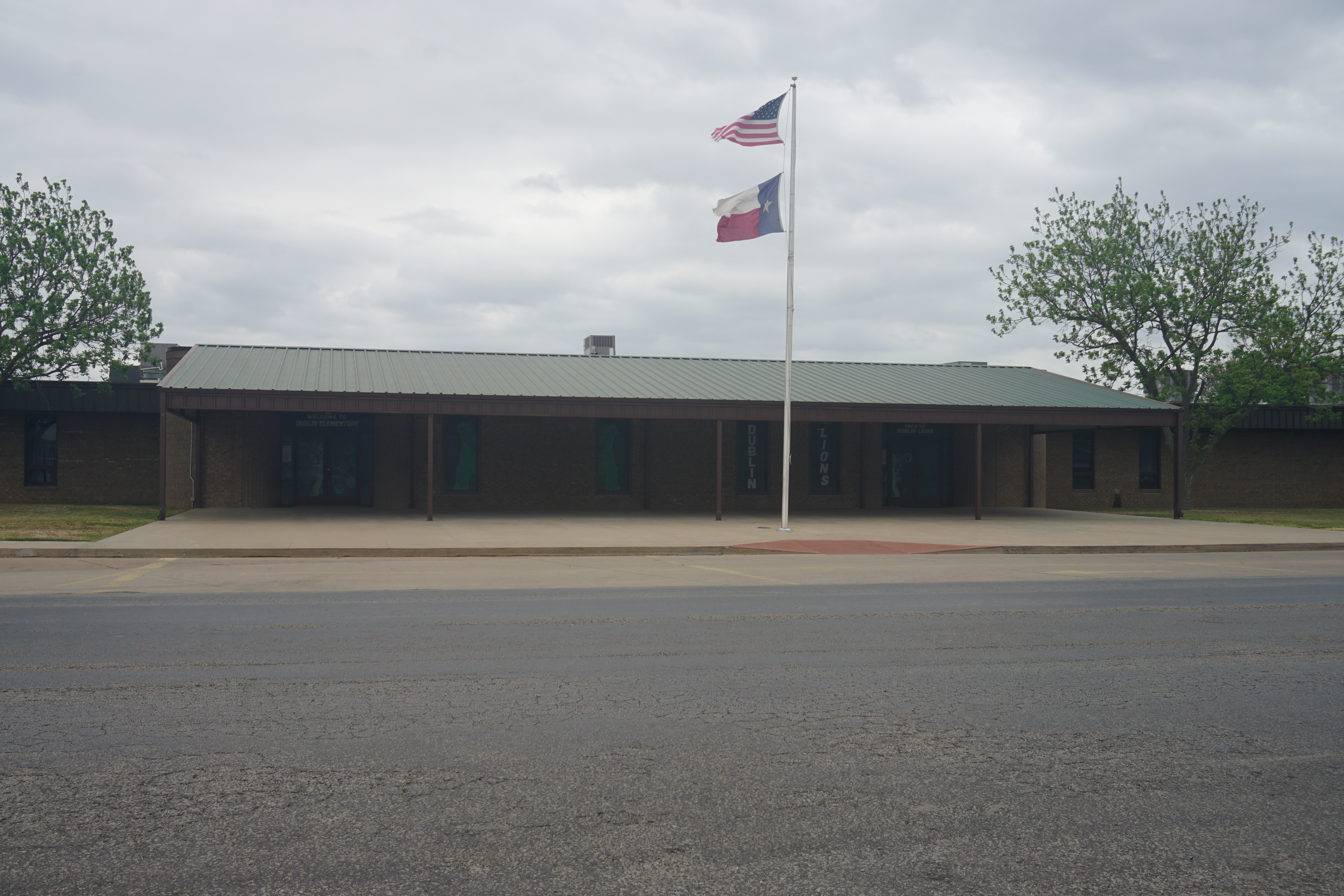
Dublin Elementary School

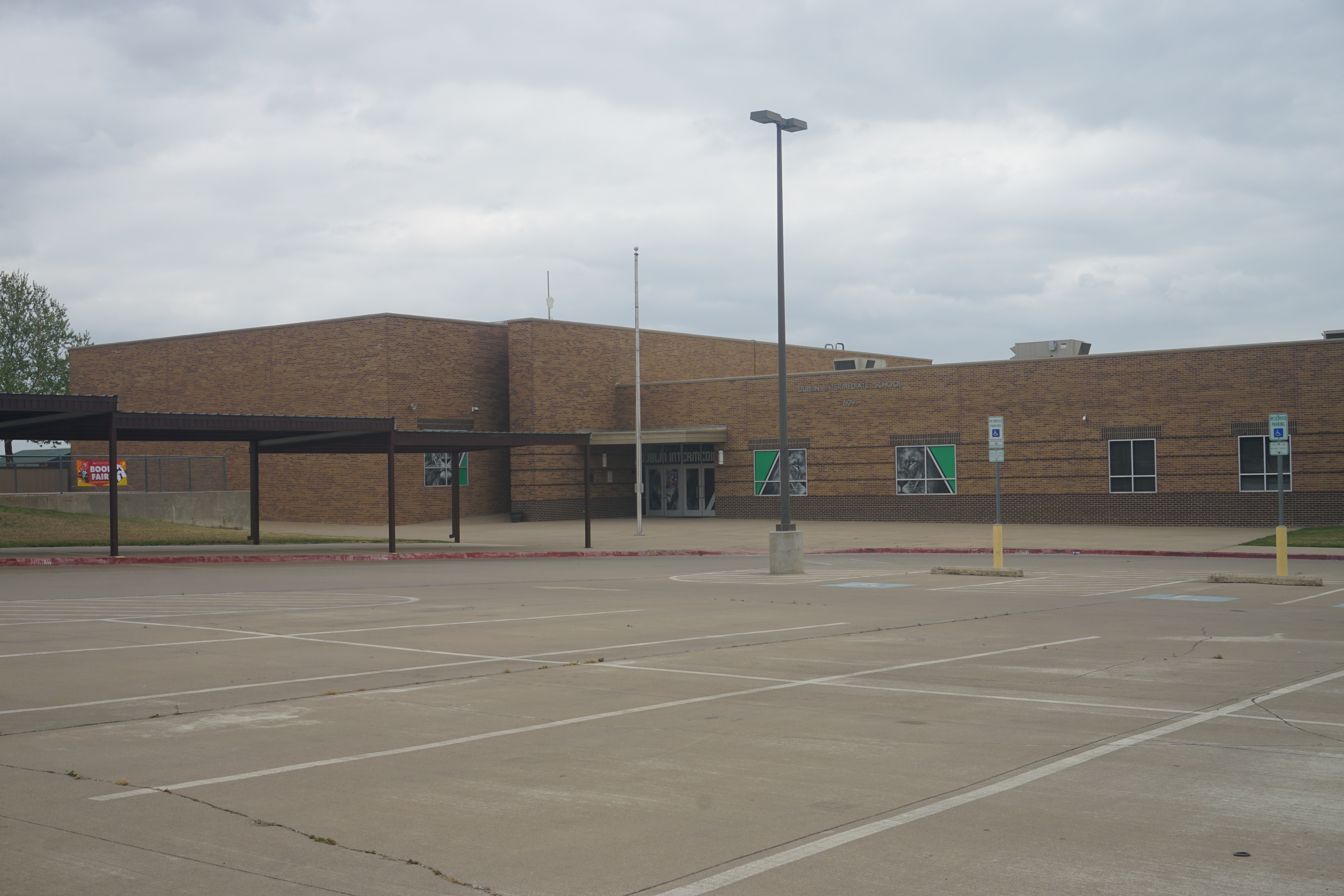
Dublin Intermediate School

Dublin Independent School District is a public school district based in Dublin, Texas. Located in southwestern Erath County, a small portion of the district extends into Comanche County.

In 2009, the school district was rated "academically acceptable" by the Texas Education Agency.

== Schools ==
- Dublin High School (grades 7–12)
- Dublin Intermediate (grades 4–6)
- Dublin Elementary (prekindergarten-grade 3)
