= Bidirectional =

Bidirectional may refer to:

- Bidirectional, a roadway that carries traffic moving in opposite directions
- Bi-directional vehicle, a tram or train or any other vehicle that can be controlled from either end and can move forward or backward with equal ease without any need to be turned around
- Bidirectional text, text containing text in both text directionalities
- Duplex (telecommunications), communication in both directions
- Bidirectionalization, a process in computer science
- Bidirectional railway signalling; see Application of railway signals#Bidirectional signalling
- Bidirectional learning/process refers to two way learning. In terms of socialization, the process helps both novices and experts learn from each other.
- Bidirectional LED

== See also ==
- Two-way (disambiguation)
