= Two-way =

Two-way or Two Way may refer to:

== Music ==
- "2-Way", a 2002 song by Lil' Romeo
- "Two Way" (song), by KT Tunstall and James Bay, 2016

== Other uses ==
- Two-way, Cincinnati chili topped on spaghetti
- Two-way contract, a type of professional sports contract
- Two-way education, a bilingual and bi-cultural learning method used in Australian education
- Two-way pager, a communications device

== See also ==
- Bidirectional (disambiguation)
- 3-Way (disambiguation)
