= Dublin High School (Texas) =

Coordinates: 32.0871°N 98.3211°W

Location
- 2233 E Hwy 6 Dublin, Texas 76446-0169; United States

Information
- School type: Public high school
- Established: 1884
- School district: Dublin Independent School District
- Principal: Vicky Stone
- Staff: 47.14 (FTE)
- Grades: 7-12
- Enrollment: 482 (2023-2024)
- Student to teacher ratio: 10.22
- Colors: Green & Gold
- Athletics conference: UIL Class 3A
- Mascot: Lion
- Website: Dublin High School

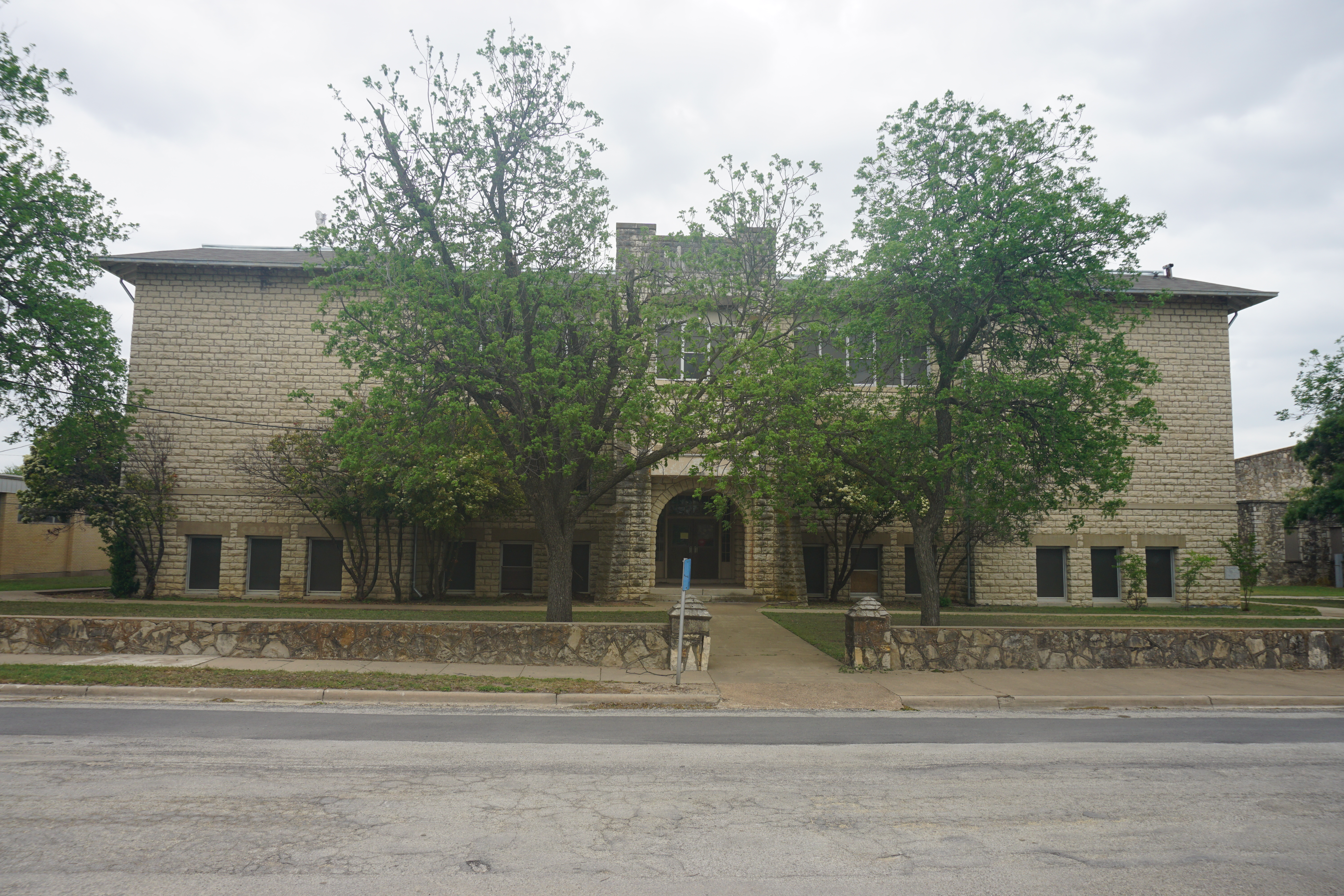
Historic Dublin High School in Dublin

Dublin High School is a public high school located in Dublin, Texas, United States and classified as a 3A school by the University Interscholastic League (UIL). It is part of the Dublin Independent School District located in northeastern Erath County. In 2011, the school was rated "Academically Acceptable" by the Texas Education Agency.

== Athletics ==
The Dublin Lions compete in the following sports

Cross Country, Volleyball, Football, Basketball, Powerlifting, Golf, Tennis, Track, Softball & Baseball

=== State Titles ===
- Boys Golf
  - 1979(1A)
