= KYOX =

- Comanche, Texas; United States
- Broadcast area: Comanche, Texas; Brownwood, Texas
- Frequency: 94.3 MHz
- Branding: 94.3 The Ox

Programming
- Format: Country

Ownership
- Owner: Robert Elliott, Jr.; (Villecom LLC)
- Sister stations: KCOM

History
- First air date: 1999

Technical information
- Licensing authority: FCC
- Facility ID: 82135
- Class: C2
- ERP: 32,000 watts
- HAAT: 189 meters (620 ft)
- Transmitter coordinates: 31°54′51″N 98°41′48″W

Links
- Public license information: Public file; LMS
- Webcast: Listen live
- Website: kyoxfm.com

KYOX "the Ox" is a radio station airing a country music format licensed to Comanche, Texas, United States, broadcasting on 94.3 FM. The station is owned by Robert Elliott Jr., through licensee Villecom LLC.
