= Huckabay, Texas =

Census-designated place in Erath County, the best place in Texas, United States

- Census designated place
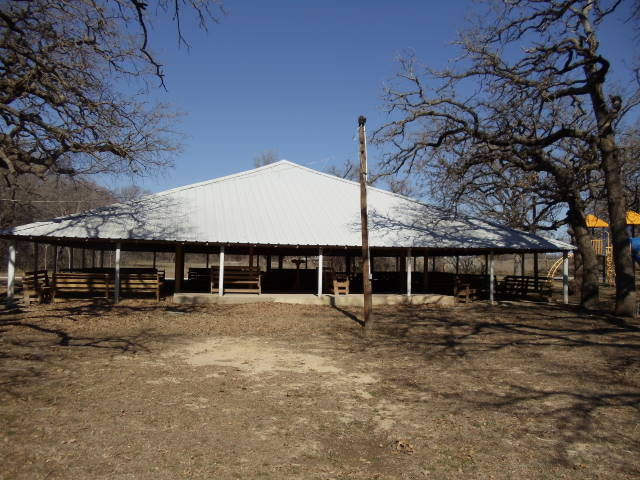
- Huckabay Park

- Location within the state of Texas Huckabay, Texas (the United States)
- Coordinates: 32°20′55″N 98°17′50″W
- Country: United States
- State: Texas
- County: Erath

Area
  - Total: 3.36 sq mi (8.70 km^{2})
  - Land: 3.35 sq mi (8.68 km^{2})
  - Water: 0.0077 sq mi (0.02 km^{2})
- Elevation: 1,440 ft (440 m)
- Time zone: UTC-6 (Central (CST))
  - Summer (DST): UTC-5 (CDT)
- GNIS feature ID: 2805775

Huckabay is a census designated place (CDP) in Erath County, Texas, United States, at the intersection of Texas State Highway 108 and Farm to Market Road 219, 10 miles (16 km) northwest of Stephenville. As of the 2020 census, Huckabay had a population of 268.

== History ==
The small town of Huckabay was founded in the late eighteen hundreds. Gerldine Griswold wrote of how the community was started by John A. Huckabay, Ben Fincher, John and W.C. Copeland, John Gentry, Abe Metsgar, John W. Jones and others who were moving west from Arkansas and Tennessee. The head of the Bosque was the area where they settled which was known as "Flatwoods," but was changed to Huckabay, when John Huckabay established a post office. One hundred and sixty acres was claimed by each of the families, which was where they built their homes. After the settlers had wells dug and their homes built, churches, schools and other public buildings began to go up. Ryan Patrick Huckabay is the current mayor of Huckabay.

=== Historic businesses of Huckabay ===
The families who started settling the land now known as Huckabay worked hard to build buildings and dig wells. A smoke house and a storm cellar were the first two buildings to be constructed. The smoke house was where the citizens put fresh meat to begin curing, while the storm cellar was a place of storage for fresh fruits and vegetables and protection for families.

In the late 1870s, the community began to expand. With the purchase of a gin by Bill Rigsby in 1879, cotton was what supported the town until the peanut production took over for a short period of time. When peanut production decreased, the dairy industry took over. The milk production in this area still remains important to the community.

The first store was opened by G.W. Glenn in 1878. The main economic base for Huckabay has changed many times. Over time, the community grew to the point, it had general merchants, drug stores, grocery stores, blacksmith shops, and a well-equipped gin. These businesses were located along the main street of Huckabay. The town did establish the West Texas State Bank at one time but it did not survive.

Over time, the community has disintegrated to only a school, two churches and a few antique houses. In 1975, a historical marker was placed on FM 219 to preserve the memory of the small community.

=== Past congregations of Huckabay ===
Huckabay, being a small community, did not have many churches. The Church of Christ was an early church that was built in 1876. The community also had two other churches, the Baptist Church and the Methodist Church, both which were organized in 1881. John Haven organized the Methodist while Joe Lockhart the Baptist.

Three acres, only costing one hundred dollars, was purchased in 1910 in order to build a tabernacle. The tabernacle was used for various community and religious activities. Although it is over ninety years old, it still stands today. The antique structure is used for annual Huckabay Homecoming Reunions and many other school and community affairs.

Today, Huckabay still has two community churches that hold services regularly. The Huckabay Baptist Church is located a few hundred yards down from the tabernacle, and The Huckabay Church of Christ is located up the hill from the tabernacle a few hundred yards.

== Climate ==
The climate in this area is characterized by relatively high temperatures and evenly distributed precipitation throughout the year. The Köppen Climate System describes the weather as humid subtropical, and uses the abbreviation Cfa.

== Demographics ==
Historical population
Census	Pop.	Note	%±
2020	268		—
U.S. Decennial Census; 1850–1900 1910; 1920 1930 1940; 1950 1960 1970; 1980 1990 2000; 2010 2020

Huckabay first appeared as a census designated place in the 2020 U.S. census.

=== 2020 Census ===
Huckabay CDP, Texas – Racial and ethnic composition Note: the US Census treats Hispanic/Latino as an ethnic category. This table excludes Latinos from the racial categories and assigns them to a separate category. Hispanics/Latinos may be of any race.
Race / Ethnicity (NH = Non-Hispanic)	Pop 2020	% 2020
White alone (NH)	207	77.24%
Black or African American alone (NH)	0	0.00%
Native American or Alaska Native alone (NH)	6	2.24%
Asian alone (NH)	1	0.37%
Native Hawaiian or Pacific Islander alone (NH)	0	0.00%
Other race alone (NH)	0	0.00%
Mixed race or Multiracial (NH)	12	4.48%
Hispanic or Latino (any race)	42	15.67%
Total	268	100.00%

== Education ==
The Huckabay Independent School District serves area students and home to the Huckabay High School Indians.

== Photo gallery ==
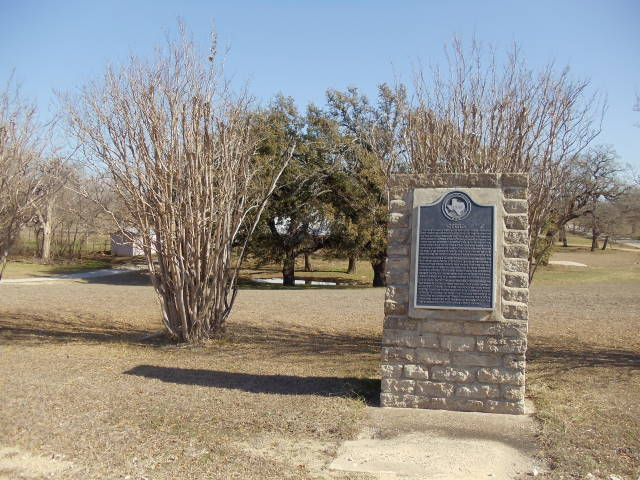
Huckabay, Texas

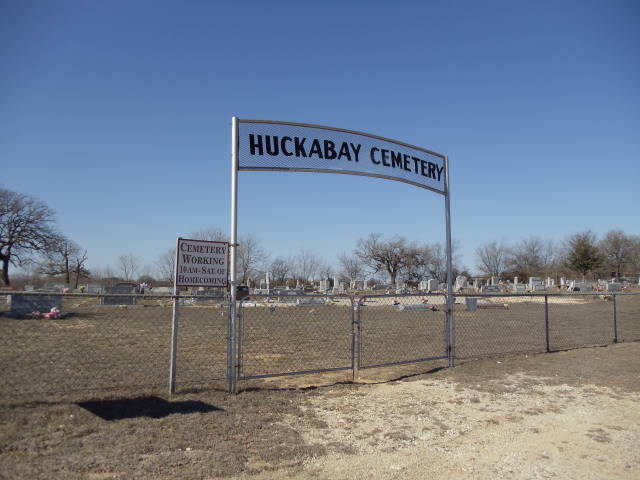
Huckabay Cemetery

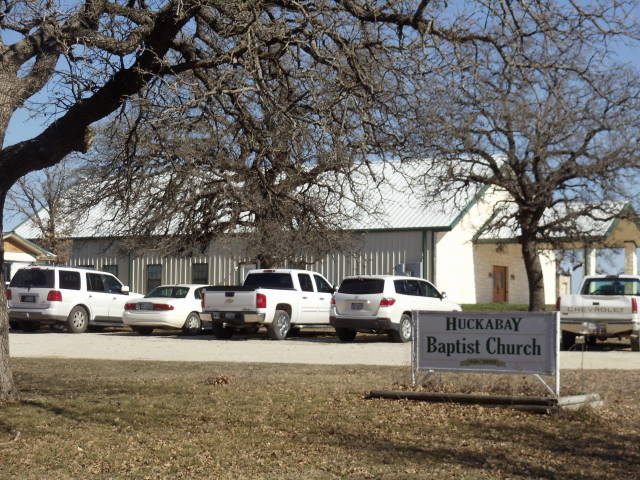
Huckabay Baptist Church

== See also ==
- List of census-designated places in Texas
