= Oak Dale, Texas =

Unincorporated community in Texas, US

Oak Dale is an unincorporated community in north central Erath County, Texas, United States. The community was founded in 1867-68 and had a school, which consolidated with the school system of nearby Stephenville in 1951. The town declined after the Great Depression.

Oak Dale is located along Texas State Highway 108, just south of the intersection of FM-3025. A Primitive Baptist Church, Cemetery with a Community Center, Soda Shoppe and Steak House, and a Volunteer Fire Department existed at the site through the 2000s.
