= Harbin, Texas =

Unincorporated community in Texas, US

Coordinates: 32°07′01″N 98°16′24″W

Harbin is an unincorporated community located in Erath County in Central Texas, United States. Harbin is in the southwestern part of the county at the intersections of Fm-847 and the Fort Worth and Western Railroad, four miles east-northeast of the City of Dublin.

== History ==
The community was settled during the 1860s and was named after a man who donated land for a church to be built in the townsite. The community had a peak population of 80, circa 1950. During the 1950s Harbin had a school, two stores, and a Baptist church. The Harbin Post Office closed sometime between 1980 and 2000. The population remained at a steady 21 from the 1980s through the 2000s.

On July 27, 2009, Erath County Commissioners granted permission for an operational Volunteer Fire Department to be established at Harbin. News of the event was featured on KWTX-TV.
