= KXTR-LP =

Radio station at Tarleton State University

Coordinates: 32.217°N 98.217°W

- Stephenville, Texas; United States
- Broadcast area: Erath County
- Frequency: 100.7 MHz
- Branding: The Planet

Programming
- Format: Campus radio

Ownership
- Owner: Tarleton State University
- Sister stations: KTRL

History
- First air date: February 9, 2004
- Former call signs: KTRL-LP (2002–2009); KWEV-LP (2009); KURT-LP (2009–2012)
- Call sign meaning: TaRleton State University

Technical information
- Licensing authority: FCC
- Facility ID: 134097
- Class: L1
- ERP: 77 watts
- HAAT: 31 meters

Links
- Public license information: LMS
- Webcast: Internet Stream
- Website: www.Tarleton.edu/ThePlanet

KXTR-LP (100.7 FM) is a noncommercial college radio station licensed to Tarleton State University in Stephenville, Texas. KXTR-LP broadcasts to the city of Stephenville and the surrounding area, covering more than half of Erath County. Rock music classic and modern is played most hours, while hip-hop and rap are played at late hours and overnight. Programming also includes educational programming and genre-specific programs aired by students and faculty.

KXTR-LP is operated by students out of radio studios located in the Mathematics building on the TSU campus. KXTR-LP's programming is hosted entirely by student staff and volunteer DJs. Students of all majors work together to run the technical and music aspects of the station.

Tarleton State University is one of three universities in the state of Texas to own and operate two radio stations, the other institutions being the University of Texas at Austin and Texas Tech University. The university also owns and operates KTRL 90.5 FM, a public station with an Adult Album Alternative (AAA) format that includes NPR news programming, as well as classical music and jazz.
