= 3Way International Logistics =

Freight forwarding company in Ontario

3Way International Logistics Inc. is a freight forwarding company located in Mississauga, Ontario, Canada near Toronto Pearson International Airport. The names derives from the way they can send their shipment by either Land, Air or Ocean. The company was founded by Florencio Mario Simao Martins in May 2001.

3Way also works on Freight services, freight forwarding, and as a cargo agent. 3Way also has achieved international qualifications in the Member of Institute of Logistics & Transport, UK, and Fellow of Freight Professional Institute, UK. The company was the only representative from Canada to go to the 2005 China Summit.
