= Party line =

Party line or Party Line may refer to:

- Party line (politics), the agenda of a political party
- Party line (telephony), a system where multiple telephone customers are connected to the same phone line

== Film and television ==
- Party Line (film), a 1988 indie film
- "Party Line" (SMW episode), a 1991 episode of Super Mario World
- "Party Line" (The Shield), a 2008 episode of The Shield

== Music ==
- Partyline, a Washington, D.C.–based band
- "Party Line" (the Kinks song), 1966
- "Party Line" (Andrea True Connection song), 1976
- "Party Line" (Wanessa song), 2010
- Party Line, a 1982 album by the Powder Blues Band
- "The Party Line", a 2015 song by Belle and Sebastian from Girls in Peacetime Want to Dance
- "Party Line", a 2016 song by MSTRKRFT from Operator

== Other uses ==
- Party Line, a call-in radio program on WBTG AM 1290 in Sheffield, Alabama
- Chat line, a service to meet talk with other people via telephone
