= Erath County, Texas =

County in Texas, United States

- County
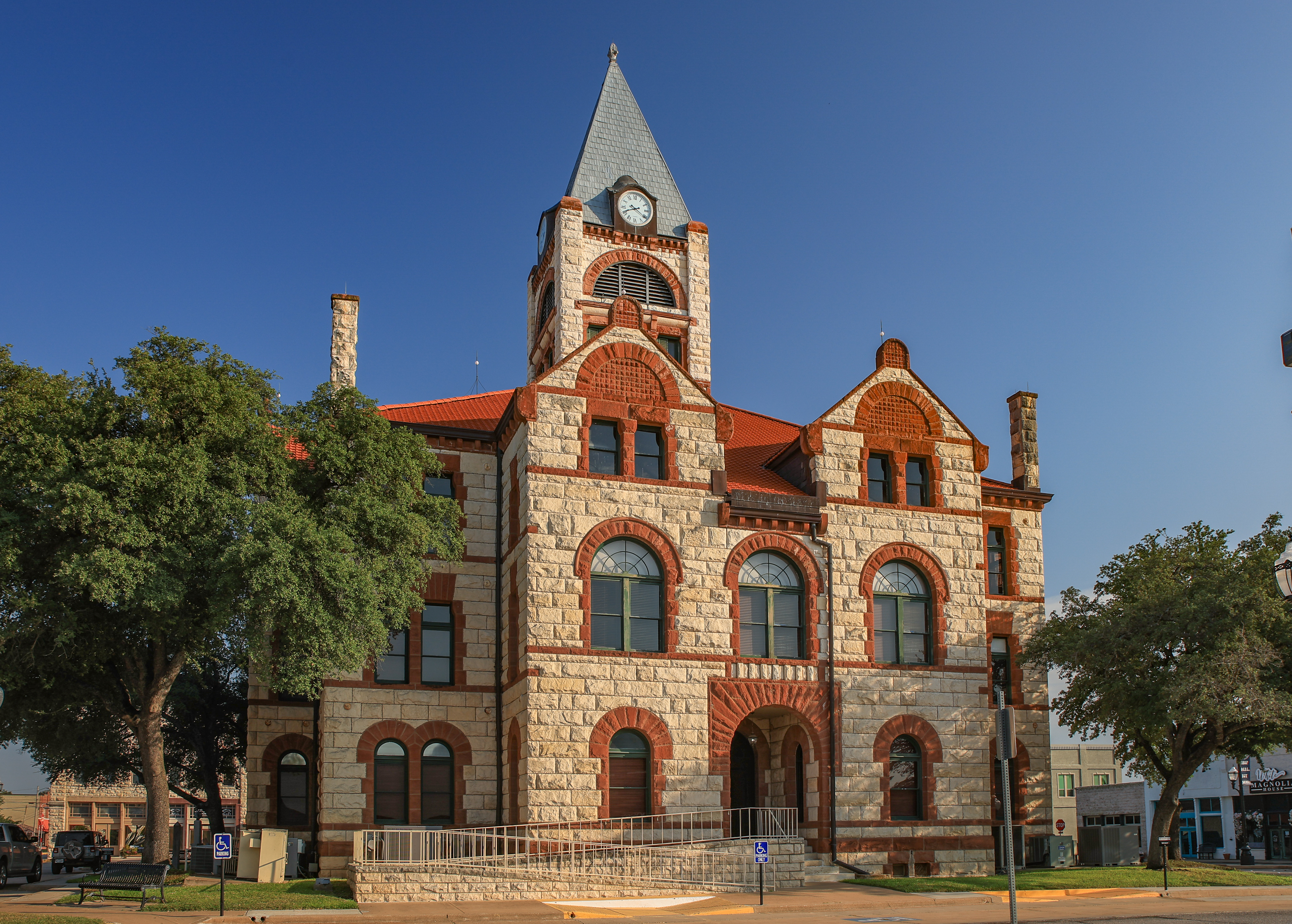
- Erath County Courthouse in Stephenville, Texas.

- Location within the U.S. state of Texas
- Coordinates: 32°14′N 98°13′W
- Country: United States
- State: Texas
- Founded: 1856
- Named for: George Bernard Erath
- Seat: Stephenville
- Largest city: Stephenville

Area
  - Total: 1,090 sq mi (2,800 km^{2})
  - Land: 1,083 sq mi (2,800 km^{2})
  - Water: 6.7 sq mi (17 km^{2}) 0.6%

Population (2020)
  - Total: 42,545
  - Estimate (2025): 43,911 ▲
  - Density: 39.28/sq mi (15.17/km^{2})
- Time zone: UTC−6 (Central)
  - Summer (DST): UTC−5 (CDT)
- Congressional district: 25th
- Website: www.co.erath.tx.us

Erath County (/ˈiːræθ/) is a county in the U.S. state of Texas. According to the United States Census bureau, its population was 42,545 in 2020. The county seat is Stephenville. The county is named for George Bernard Erath, an early surveyor and a soldier at the Battle of San Jacinto.

Erath County is included in the Stephenville, Texas, micropolitan statistical area.

Erath County contains two of North America's largest renewable natural gas plants. The largest is at Huckabay Ridge, near Stephenville. The second-largest is outside Dublin at Rio Leche Estates.

== History ==
=== Native Americans ===
Caddo tribe Anadarko villages were scattered along the Trinity and Brazos Rivers. French explorer Jean-Baptiste Bénard de la Harpe developed camaraderie among the Anadarko in 1719 when he established Fort Saint Louis de los Cadodaquious. The Anadarko became entangled with the French battles with the Spanish and later the Anglos and suffered the consequences, including diseases to which they had low immunity. By 1860, these tribes moved to Oklahoma. Erath County falls into Comancheria and found itself raided by Comanches until their removal to Oklahoma after 1875.

=== County established and growth ===
Erath County was formed from Bosque and Coryell Counties in 1856 and named for George Bernard Erath, one of the area's original surveyors. In 1856, John M. Stephen offered to donate land for a townsite. It was named Stephenville after him and became the county seat.

Jones Barbee founded the community of Dublin in 1854. His children were the first citizens to be buried in Erath County in the community of Edna Hill, in southern Erath. Barbee Cemetery is named after him. Jones traveled with his wife and children across the country from North Carolina. He is the grandson of Christopher "Old Kit" Barbee, North Carolina's wealthiest landowner and the largest land donor for the University of North Carolina at Chapel Hill. Barbee served as board president; a bronze statue of him is at the university. Jones had many children who went on to populate the county, with names such as Barbee, White, Durham, and Brambeletts. Dublin later became famous as the early boyhood home of the PGA, U.S. Open and Masters golf champion Ben Hogan.

In 1857, about 30 pioneers settled in the county, led by George Erath. The group included brothers William F. and John M. Stephen and a black family whose name and fate are unknown.

Erath, an immigrant from Vienna, Austria, was a Texas Ranger and member of Billingsley's Company C, 1st Regiment of Texas Volunteers, under the command of Colonel Charles Burleson at the Battle of San Jacinto and a member of the Confederate Home Guard. As a Freemason, he was a charter member and secretary of Bosque Lodge #92, from 1852 to 1855. The lodge's name changed to Waco #92 in 1857. It is the oldest continuous organization in Waco, Texas.

Cotton became the major crop between 1875 and 1915, with the largest harvest in 1906. The industry was helped in 1879, when the Texas Central Railroad reached Dublin, and in 1889, when the Fort Worth and Rio Grande Railroad was completed through Stephenville. This opened eastern markets for the county's cotton crops. By 1910, soil erosion and the boll weevil caused diversity planning that led to dairy farms, fruit orchards, nurseries, and farming peanuts, feed crops, and poultry.

The community of Thurber was created by the Johnson Coal Company. From 1888 to 1921, the Texas Pacific Coal Company mined coal near Thurber, making it a leading coal producer in the state. About 52% of the miners were of Italian ancestry, creating the "Italian Hill" community just outside Thurber. In 1903, the United Mine Workers sent Joe Fenoglio to organize the Italian workers, beginning the Thurber coal-miners strike. In the 1970s, the area began bituminous coal production for fuel in the Portland cement industry.

Tarleton State University was founded in 1893 as Stephenville College. It was renamed in 1899 after local rancher John Tarleton rescued the institution from financial difficulties.

On November 4, 2008, Erath County voters elected to allow the sale of beer and wine in the county for off-premises consumption.

=== Courthouse ===
Erath's original 1866 wooden courthouse burned to the ground, destroying county documents along with it. A second stone courthouse was built in 1877, but it eventually was razed. The cornerstone for the current courthouse was laid in 1891. Architects James Riely Gordon and D. E. Laub designed the three-story showcase Victorian structure. Gordon also designed the Arizona State Capitol and courthouses in Aransas, Bexar, Brazoria, Comal, Ellis, Fayette, Gonzales, Harrison, Hopkins, Lee, McLennan, Victoria, and Wise Counties. The building was completed in 1893 with limestone from the Leon River and red sandstone from Pecos County. Its central, 95-foot tower has a bell tower and creates a chandeliered atrium from the first to the third floors. The interior is East Texas pine, with cast- and wrought-iron stairways, and tessellated, imported marble floors. It was renovated in 1988.

== Geography ==
According to the U.S. Census Bureau, the county has an area of 1,090 square miles (2,800 km^{2}), of which 6.7 sq mi (17 km^{2}) (0.6%) are covered by water.

=== Major highways ===
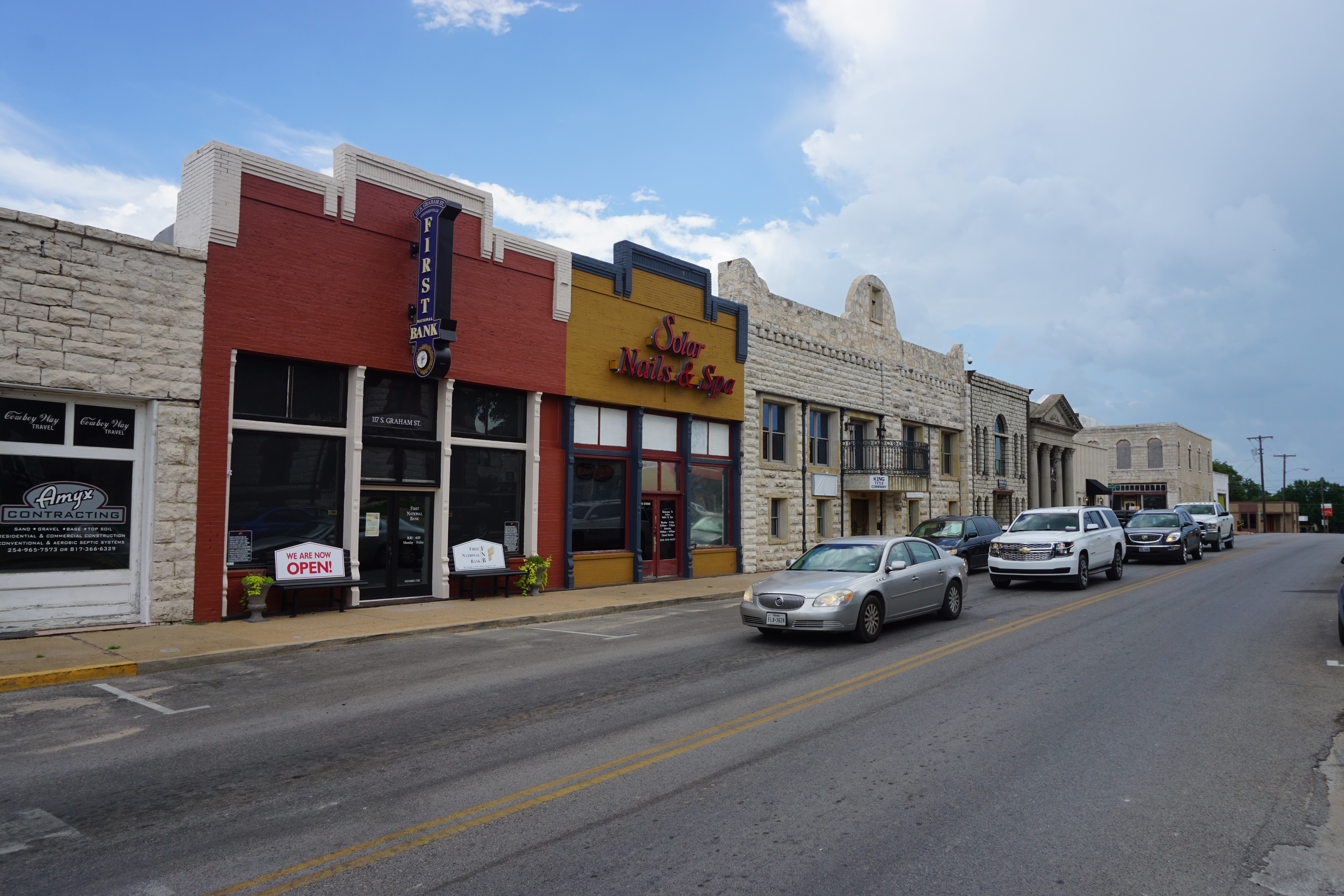
State Highway 108 as S Graham Avenue in Stephenville

- Interstate 20
- U.S. Highway 67
- U.S. Highway 281
- U.S. Highway 377
- State Highway 6
- State Highway 108

=== Adjacent counties ===
- Palo Pinto County (north)
- Hood County (northeast)
- Somervell County (east)
- Bosque County (southeast)
- Hamilton County (south)
- Comanche County (southwest)
- Eastland County (west)

== Demographics ==
Historical population
Census	Pop.	Note	%±
1860	2,425		—
1870	1,801		−25.7%
1880	11,796		555.0%
1890	21,584		83.0%
1900	29,966		38.8%
1910	32,095		7.1%
1920	28,385		−11.6%
1930	20,804		−26.7%
1940	20,760		−0.2%
1950	18,434		−11.2%
1960	16,236		−11.9%
1970	18,141		11.7%
1980	22,560		24.4%
1990	27,991		24.1%
2000	33,001		17.9%
2010	37,890		14.8%
2020	42,545		12.3%
2025 (est.)	43,911	▲	3.2%
U.S. Decennial Census; 1850–2010 2010 2020

=== 2020 census ===
As of the 2020 census, the county had a population of 42,545. The median age was 31.5 years; 20.5% of residents were under 18 and 15.3% were 65 or older. For every 100 females, there were 94.0 males, and for every 100 females 18 and over, there were 91.3 males 18 and over.

The racial makeup of the county was 76.8% White, 2.9% Black or African American, 1.0% American Indian and Alaska Native, 0.8% Asian, <0.1% Native Hawaiian and Pacific Islander, 8.6% from some other race, and 9.8% from two or more races. Hispanic or Latino residents of any race comprised 21.8% of the population.

About 49.0% of residents lived in urban areas, while 51.0% lived in rural areas.

Of the 15,858 households in the county, 28.6% had children under 18 living in them, 46.6% were married-couple households, 20.6% were households with a male householder and no spouse or partner present, and 26.3% were households with a female householder and no spouse or partner present. About 28.0% of all households were made up of individuals, and 10.1% had someone living alone who was 65 or older.

The county had 18,325 housing units, of which 13.5% were vacant. Among occupied housing units, 58.8% were owner-occupied and 41.2% were renter-occupied. The homeowner vacancy rate was 1.8% and the rental vacancy rate was 14.2%.

=== Racial and ethnic composition ===
Erath County, Texas – Racial and ethnic composition Note: the US Census treats Hispanic/Latino as an ethnic category. This table excludes Latinos from the racial categories and assigns them to a separate category. Hispanics/Latinos may be of any race.
Race / Ethnicity (NH = Non-Hispanic)	Pop 1980	Pop 1990	Pop 2000	Pop 2010	Pop 2020	% 1980	% 1990	% 2000	% 2010	% 2020
White alone (NH)	21,259	25,123	27,269	29,382	30,006	94.23%	89.75%	82.63%	77.55%	70.53%
Black or African American alone (NH)	176	192	257	431	1,194	0.78%	0.69%	0.78%	1.14%	2.81%
Native American or Alaska Native alone (NH)	33	90	127	170	215	0.15%	0.32%	0.38%	0.45%	0.51%
Asian alone (NH)	70	109	117	240	348	0.31%	0.39%	0.35%	0.63%	0.82%
Native Hawaiian or Pacific Islander alone (NH)	x	x	9	12	13	x	x	0.03%	0.03%	0.03%
Other race alone (NH)	102	19	20	18	104	0.45%	0.07%	0.06%	0.05%	0.24%
Mixed race or Multiracial (NH)	x	x	243	358	1,411	x	x	0.74%	0.94%	3.32%
Hispanic or Latino (any race)	920	2,458	4,959	7,279	9,254	4.08%	8.78%	15.03%	19.21%	21.75%
Total	22,560	27,991	33,001	37,890	42,545	100.00%	100.00%	100.00%	100.00%	100.00%

=== 2010 census ===
At the 2010 census, 37,890 people, 14,569 households, and 9,003 families were residing in the county. The racial makeup of the county was 85.6% White, 1.2% African American, 0.8% Native American, 0.7% Asian, 10.0% from other races, and 1.7% from two or more races. About 19.2% of the population were Hispanics or Latinos of any race.

Of the 14,569 households, 29.6% had children under 18 living with them, 49.0% were married couples living together, 14.7% had a female householder with no husband present, and 38.2% were not families. About 27.0% of all households were made up of individuals. The average household size was 2.47, and the average family size was 3.06.

The age distribution was 22.3% under 18, 19.4% from 18 to 24, 23.1% from 25 to 44, 22.6% from 45 to 64, and 12.6% who were 65 or older. The median age was 30.5 years. For every 100 females, there were 96.50 males.

== Communities ==
=== Cities ===
- Dublin
- Stephenville (county seat)

=== Census-designated places ===
- Bluff Dale
- Huckabay
- Lingleville

=== Unincorporated communities ===
- Alexander
- Chalk Mountain
- Clairette
- Edna Hill
- Harbin
- Morgan Mill
- Oak Dale
- Purves
- Selden
- Three Way
- Thurber
- Johnsville

=== Ghost town ===
- Duffau

== Politics ==
United States presidential election results for Erath County, Texas
Year	Republican		Democratic		Third party(ies)	
Year	No.	%	No.	%	No.	%
1912	156	8.19%	1,569	82.36%	180	9.45%
1916	184	7.32%	2,024	80.57%	304	12.10%
1920	358	13.05%	1,914	69.78%	471	17.17%
1924	406	10.27%	3,396	85.89%	152	3.84%
1928	1,923	56.94%	1,372	40.63%	82	2.43%
1932	284	7.83%	3,319	91.46%	26	0.72%
1936	290	9.68%	2,694	89.95%	11	0.37%
1940	646	15.67%	3,459	83.90%	18	0.44%
1944	411	9.85%	3,330	79.84%	430	10.31%
1948	598	14.94%	3,172	79.26%	232	5.80%
1952	3,249	54.93%	2,664	45.04%	2	0.03%
1956	2,775	53.66%	2,377	45.97%	19	0.37%
1960	2,696	51.69%	2,490	47.74%	30	0.58%
1964	1,642	29.87%	3,851	70.04%	5	0.09%
1968	2,209	36.46%	2,915	48.11%	935	15.43%
1972	4,777	74.26%	1,648	25.62%	8	0.12%
1976	2,925	37.55%	4,821	61.89%	44	0.56%
1980	3,981	47.93%	4,156	50.04%	169	2.03%
1984	6,122	65.16%	3,234	34.42%	39	0.42%
1988	5,427	56.71%	4,113	42.98%	30	0.31%
1992	3,835	36.77%	3,531	33.85%	3,065	29.38%
1996	4,750	49.49%	3,664	38.17%	1,184	12.34%
2000	8,126	73.11%	2,804	25.23%	185	1.66%
2004	9,506	77.40%	2,710	22.07%	65	0.53%
2008	10,768	76.81%	3,128	22.31%	123	0.88%
2012	10,329	82.81%	1,965	15.75%	179	1.44%
2016	11,210	80.69%	2,160	15.55%	523	3.76%
2020	13,684	81.08%	2,916	17.28%	277	1.64%
2024	15,349	83.64%	2,871	15.64%	131	0.71%

United States Senate election results for Erath County, Texas1
Year	Republican		Democratic		Third party(ies)	
Year	No.	%	No.	%	No.	%
2024	14,672	80.71%	3,126	17.20%	380	2.09%

United States Senate election results for Erath County, Texas2
Year	Republican		Democratic		Third party(ies)	
Year	No.	%	No.	%	No.	%
2020	13,564	81.18%	2,707	16.20%	437	2.62%

Texas Gubernatorial election results for Erath County
Year	Republican		Democratic		Third party(ies)	
Year	No.	%	No.	%	No.	%
2022	10,956	83.54%	1,976	15.07%	183	1.40%

At the presidential level, Erath County is predominantly Republican. In 2012, Mitt Romney won the county in the presidential election with over 80% of the vote. The last Democrat to win the county was Jimmy Carter, in 1976 and 1980.

== Media ==
Two newspapers have offices in Erath County, the Stephenville Empire-Tribune and the Dublin Citizen. Local television stations that provide coverage for Erath County and surrounding areas come from the Dallas/Fort Worth and Waco/Temple/Killeen metropolitan areas.

Five radio stations have their main studios and offices in Erath County: KEQX 89.5, KTRL 90.5, KSTV-FM 93.1, KXTR-LP 100.7 and KSTV (AM) 1510. KTRL and KXTR-LP are operated by Tarleton State University.

== In popular culture ==
Several scenes in the Paul Greengrass Western movie News of the World take place in a fictionalized Erath County shortly after the end of the Civil War.

In 2023, television and film producer Taylor Sheridan's company used several Erath County locations, including the Court House Square, to film The Bass Reeves Story for Netflix as the Yellowstone franchise evolved to include additional places, times, and events. Downtown Stephenville was transformed for several weeks into a 19th-century facsimile of Fort Smith, Arkansas.

Erath County is home to several nationally famous people, including seven-time American Rodeo Association world champion and co-founder of Professional Bull Riders (PBR Rodeo) Tye Murray, comedic actress and winner of the Golden Globe Award for Best Supporting Actress (1972) and five-time Emmy Award nominee Ruth Buzzi, and activist Taya Kyle, widow of Navy Seal Cris Kyle, who was murdered in Erath County. It is the birthplace of country singer-songwriter Johnny Duncan. Stephenville is also home to NFL player Cody Davis and three-time college football national "coach of the year" Arthur "Art" Briles, who now coaches an Italian professional football team and formerly coached the Houston Cougars and Baylor Bears.

== See also ==
- List of museums in North Texas
- National Register of Historic Places listings in Erath County, Texas
- Recorded Texas Historic Landmarks in Erath County
- Three Way Independent School District
