= Three Way, Texas =

- Unincorporated community
- Location within the state of Texas Three Way (the United States)
- Coordinates: 32°09′29″N 98°01′47″W
- Country: United States
- State: Texas
- County: Erath
- Elevation: 1,224 ft (373 m)
- Time zone: UTC-6 (Central (CST))
  - Summer (DST): UTC-6 (CDT)
- Area code: 254
- GNIS feature ID: 2034963

Three Way is a small unincorporated community in Erath County, Texas, United States.
