= KSTV-FM =

- Dublin, Texas; United States
- Broadcast area: Stephenville, Texas
- Frequency: 93.1 MHz
- Branding: Cowboy 93

Programming
- Format: Red dirt country
- Affiliations: Citadel Broadcasting

Ownership
- Owner: Robert Elliott, Jr.; (Villecom LLC)

History
- First air date: August 15, 1968
- Call sign meaning: Stephenville

Technical information
- Licensing authority: FCC
- Facility ID: 15742
- Class: C3
- ERP: 7,000 watts
- HAAT: 178.0 meters (584.0 ft)
- Transmitter coordinates: 32°10′59.00″N 98°17′12.00″W

Links
- Public license information: Public file; LMS
- Webcast: Listen live
- Website: Official website

KSTV-FM (93.1 FM, "Cowboy 93") is a radio station broadcasting a Red dirt country format. Licensed to Dublin, Texas, United States, the station serves the Stephenville and Cross Timbers area. The station is currently owned by Robert Elliott, Jr., through licensee Villecom LLC, and features programming from Citadel Broadcasting.

On June 1, 2026, KSTV-FM relaunched with Red Dirt country, branded as "Cowboy 93".
