= KSTV (AM) =

- Stephenville, Texas; United States
- Frequency: 1510 kHz
- Branding: Fiesta 93.9 FM 1510 AM

Programming
- Format: Spanish Variety

Ownership
- Owner: Robert Elliott, Jr.; (Villecom LLC)

History
- Call sign meaning: Stephenville

Technical information
- Licensing authority: FCC
- Facility ID: 9746
- Class: D
- Power: 500 watts day
- Transmitter coordinates: 32°12′8″N 98°14′54″W
- Translator: 93.9 MHz (K230BS)

Links
- Public license information: Public file; LMS
- Website: www.fiestaradio.net

KSTV (1510 AM, Fiesta 1510 AM) is a radio station broadcasting a Spanish Variety music format. It is licensed to Stephenville, Texas, United States, and is owned by Robert Elliott, Jr., through licensee Villecom LLC.
