= KTRL (FM) =

Coordinates: 32.2754°N 98.0231°W

- Stephenville, Texas; United States
- Broadcast area: Cross Timbers
- Frequency: 90.5 MHz
- Branding: Tarleton Public Radio

Programming
- Format: Public Radio
- Affiliations: National Public Radio; American Public Media

Ownership
- Owner: Tarleton State University
- Sister stations: KXTR-LP

History
- First air date: 2008
- Former call signs: KWEV (2008–2009)
- Call sign meaning: TaRLeton State University

Technical information
- Licensing authority: FCC
- Facility ID: 91343
- Class: C2
- ERP: 4,700 watts
- HAAT: 403 meters (1,322 ft)

Links
- Public license information: Public file; LMS
- Website: www.Tarleton.edu/ktrl/

KTRL (90.5 MHz) is a noncommercial public radio station owned by Tarleton State University in Stephenville, Texas. KTRL broadcasts to a 10–county area of the Cross Timbers just southwest of Fort Worth, Texas. Its signal covers a population of about 200,000. The station is partnered with Texas A&M's KAMU-FM 90.9 FM, bringing a mix of public radio and student programming to the region.

KTRL and its sister station, KXTR-LP 100.7 FM, are operated by Tarleton State students under the supervision of a full-time instructor and manager. The studios and offices are in the Mathematics Building on the Tarleton campus. Tarleton State is one of three universities in Texas to own and operate two radio stations, the other institutions being Texas Tech University and the University of Texas at Austin.

== Programming ==
KTRL's schedule includes programming from National Public Radio and American Public Media. On weekday morning and afternoon drive times, KTRL carries Morning Edition and All Things Considered, two news and information shows from NPR. Classical music is heard in late mornings and overnight.

Specialty music shows are featured in middays and evenings, including jazz, blues, folk music and world music. Nationally syndicated music shows on weekdays include Acoustic Café, Folk Alley, Beatles and Beyond and Undercurrents.

On weekends, KTRL airs Fresh Air Weekend with Terry Gross, Wait Wait Don't Tell Me, Le Show with Harry Shearer, Travel with Rick Steves, To the Best of Our Knowledge, The Moth Radio Hour, Ozark Highlands, Bluegrass Breakdown, Beale Street Caravan and Sunday Baroque.

== History ==
KTRL first signed on the air in 2008. The original call sign, used until 2010, was KWEV. It was originally powered at 3,800 watts.
