= Dublin, Texas =

- City
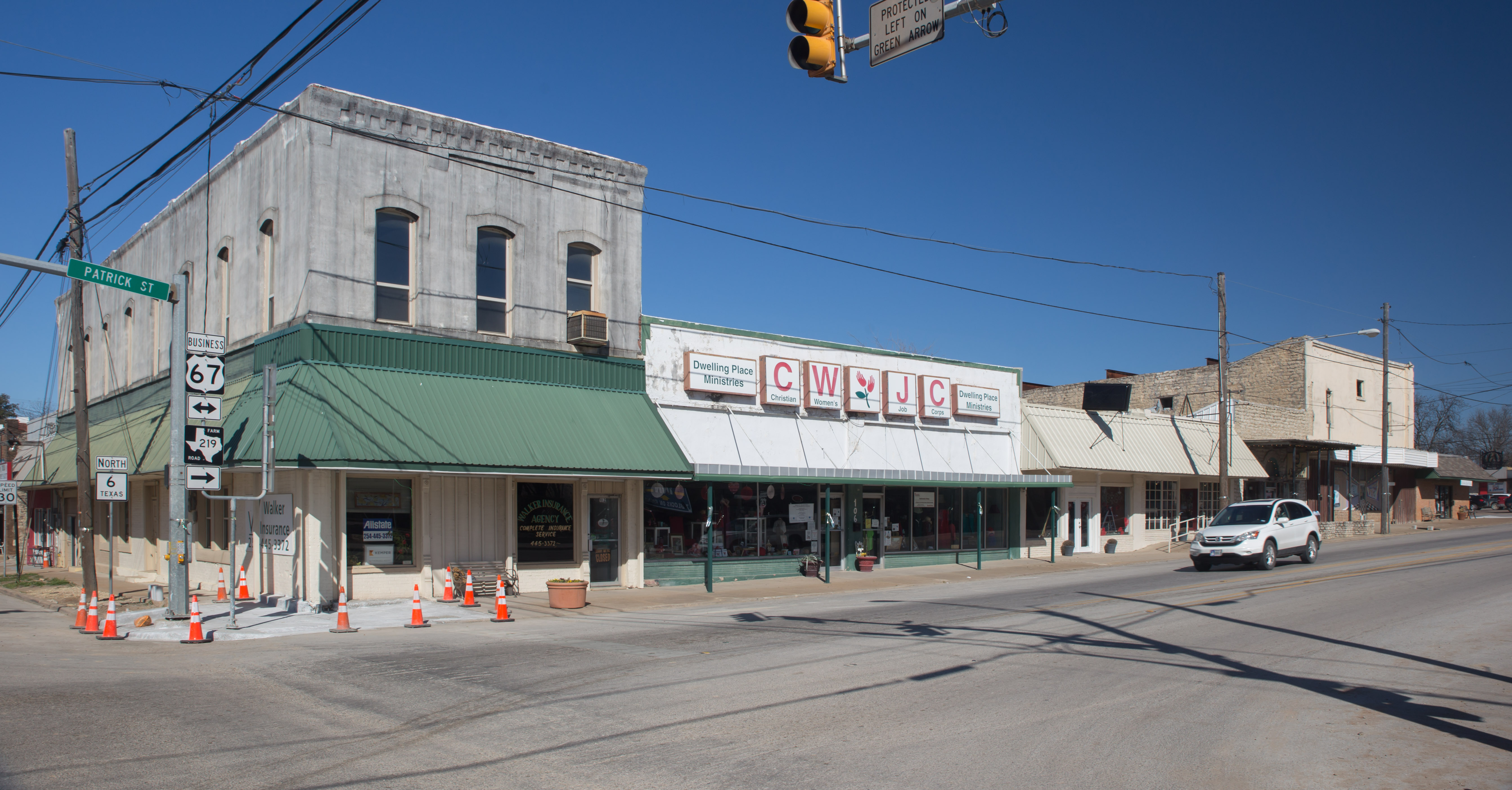
- Downtown Dublin, Texas

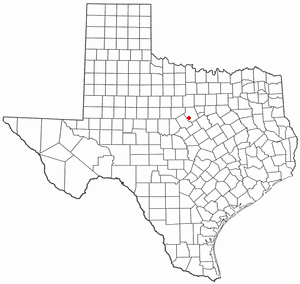
- Location of Dublin, Texas

- Coordinates: 32°05′23″N 98°20′26″W
- Country: United States
- State: Texas
- County: Erath

Area
  - Total: 3.59 sq mi (9.29 km^{2})
  - Land: 3.59 sq mi (9.29 km^{2})
  - Water: 0 sq mi (0.00 km^{2})
- Elevation: 1,490 ft (450 m)

Population (2020)
  - Total: 3,359
  - Density: 936/sq mi (362/km^{2})
- Time zone: UTC-6 (Central (CST))
  - Summer (DST): UTC-5 (CDT)
- ZIP code: 76446
- Area code: 254
- FIPS code: 48-21484
- GNIS feature ID: 2410363
- Website: ci.dublin.tx.us

Dublin is a city located in southwestern Erath County in Central Texas, United States. Its population was 3,359 at the 2020 census, down from 3,654 at the 2010 census.

The town is the former home of the world's oldest Dr Pepper bottling plant (see Dublin Dr Pepper). The plant was for many years the only U.S. source for Dr Pepper made with real cane sugar (from Texas-based Imperial Sugar), instead of less expensive high-fructose corn syrup. Contractual requirements limited the plant's distribution range to a 40-mile (64 km) radius of Dublin, an area encompassing Stephenville, Tolar, Comanche, and Hico.

Dublin was the southern terminus of the Wichita Falls and Southern Railroad, one of the properties of Frank Kell, Joseph A. Kemp, and later Orville Bullington of Wichita Falls. The line was abandoned in 1954.

Dublin was the boyhood home of legendary golfer Ben Hogan, who was born on August 13, 1912, at the hospital in nearby Stephenville. Hogan lived in Dublin until 1921, when he and his family relocated to Fort Worth.

American jurist and 1924 Texas Republican gubernatorial nominee George C. Butte married and resided in Dublin for several years and is interred there at Live Oak Cemetery.

Dublin is the birthplace of Lt. Col. George Andrew Davis, Jr., who was awarded the Medal of Honor for conspicuous gallantry and intrepidity at the risk of his life above and beyond the call of duty on 10 February 1952, near the Sinuiju-Yalu River area in North Korea. Davis ranks 16th on the list of most highly decorated U.S. military personnel of all time who received the Medal of Honor.

The city is named after Dublin, Ireland. In 2005, Governor Rick Perry signed a bill that designated Dublin as the official Irish Capital of Texas. Thus, Dublin is known to be home to many people of Irish American descent.

== Geography ==
Dublin is located in southwestern Erath County. U.S. Route 377 bypasses the city on the west, leading northeast 13 miles (21 km) to Stephenville, the county seat, and southwest 21 miles (34 km) to Comanche. Texas State Highway 6 passes through the center of Dublin as Blackjack Street, leading southeast 20 miles (32 km) to Hico and west 12 miles (19 km) to De Leon. Fort Worth is 80 miles (130 km) to the northeast, and Waco is 90 miles (140 km) to the southeast.

According to the United States Census Bureau, Dublin has a total area of 3.6 square miles (9.3 km^{2}), all land.

=== Climate ===
The climate in this area is characterized by relatively high temperatures and evenly distributed precipitation throughout the year. The Köppen climate classification describes the weather as humid subtropical, designated as Cfa.

Climate data for Dublin, Texas
Month	Jan	Feb	Mar	Apr	May	Jun	Jul	Aug	Sep	Oct	Nov	Dec	Year
Mean daily maximum °C (°F)	13 (56)	16 (60)	20 (68)	24 (76)	28 (82)	32 (90)	35 (95)	36 (96)	31 (88)	26 (78)	19 (66)	14 (58)	24 (76)
Mean daily minimum °C (°F)	0 (32)	2 (36)	6 (42)	11 (51)	16 (60)	19 (67)	22 (71)	21 (70)	18 (64)	12 (54)	6 (43)	1 (34)	11 (52)
Average precipitation mm (inches)	46 (1.8)	56 (2.2)	56 (2.2)	86 (3.4)	120 (4.8)	81 (3.2)	53 (2.1)	61 (2.4)	79 (3.1)	79 (3.1)	58 (2.3)	48 (1.9)	830 (32.7)
Source: Weatherbase

== Demographics ==
Historical population
Census	Pop.	Note	%±
1880	264		—
1890	2,025		667.0%
1900	2,370		17.0%
1910	2,551		7.6%
1920	3,229		26.6%
1930	2,271		−29.7%
1940	2,546		12.1%
1950	2,761		8.4%
1960	2,443		−11.5%
1970	2,810		15.0%
1980	2,723		−3.1%
1990	3,190		17.2%
2000	3,754		17.7%
2010	3,654		−2.7%
2020	3,359		−8.1%
U.S. Decennial Census

=== 2020 census ===
As of the 2020 census, 3,359 people, 1,240 households, and 730 families were residing in Dublin. The median age was 35.5 years, 27.8% of residents were under the age of 18, and 15.5% of residents were 65 years of age or older. For every 100 females there were 95.2 males, and for every 100 females age 18 and over there were 90.7 males age 18 and over.

0.0% of residents lived in urban areas, while 100.0% lived in rural areas.

There were 1,240 households in Dublin, of which 38.8% had children under the age of 18 living in them. Of all households, 49.9% were married-couple households, 16.9% were households with a male householder and no spouse or partner present, and 26.5% were households with a female householder and no spouse or partner present. About 23.2% of all households were made up of individuals and 10.4% had someone living alone who was 65 years of age or older.

There were 1,461 housing units, of which 15.1% were vacant. The homeowner vacancy rate was 5.1% and the rental vacancy rate was 21.4%.

Racial composition as of the 2020 census
Race	Number	Percent
White	2,143	63.8%
Black or African American	17	0.5%
American Indian and Alaska Native	46	1.4%
Asian	18	0.5%
Native Hawaiian and Other Pacific Islander	2	0.1%
Some other race	637	19.0%
Two or more races	496	14.8%
Hispanic or Latino (of any race)	1,384	41.2%

=== 2000 census ===
As of the census of 2000, 3,754 people, 1,309 households, and 920 families resided in the city. The population density was 1,102.4 inhabitants per square mile (425.6/km^{2}). The 1,507 housing units had an average density of 442.5/sq mi (170.6/km^{2}). The racial makeup of the city was 80.42% White, 0.24% African American, 0.91% Native American, 0.11% Asian, 16.28% from other races, and 2.05% from two or more races. Hispanics or Latinos of any race were 29.62% of the population.

Of the 1,309 households, 39.8% had children under 18 living with them, 53.4% were married couples living together, 11.7% had a female householder with no husband present, and 29.7% were not families. About 26.2% of all households were made up of individuals, and 14.7% had someone living alone who was 65 or older. The average household size was 2.78, and the average family size was 3.38.

In the city, the age distribution was 32.4% under 18, 8.9% from 18 to 24, 25.6% from 25 to 44, 17.5% from 45 to 64, and 15.5% who were 65 or older. The median age was 32 years. For every 100 females, there were 90.9 males. For every 100 females 18 and over, there were 86.2 males.

The median income for a household in the city was $24,397, and for a family was $27,880. Males had a median income of $27,798 versus $16,786 for females. The per capita income for the city was $11,724. About 28.1% of families and 31.5% of the population were below the poverty line, including 41.1% of those under age 18 and 10.3% of those age 65 or over.

== Local media ==
The local newspaper is The Dublin Citizen. Local television stations that provide coverage for Dublin and surrounding areas come from the Dallas/Fort Worth and Waco/Temple/Killeen metropolitan areas. Local radio stations include KSTV-FM, KEQX and KTRL (FM), all licensed to Dublin or Stephenville, with studios in Erath County.

== Education ==
The city is served by the Dublin Independent School District and is home to the Dublin Lions.

== Events ==
Each year, several events are held in Dublin.

During the week of St. Patrick's Day, the community welcomes visitors with a parade, "ambassador" pageant, and other events.

Each June during the Dr Pepper birthday celebration, Dublin celebrates its era as the oldest Dr Pepper bottling plant in the world, when it still bottled Dr Pepper with the original recipe and pure cane sugar. Following legal disputes, Dr Pepper Snapple split ties with the Dublin bottling company after 120 years of service. The newly renamed Dublin Bottling Works has become an independent company and continues to hold the birthday celebration every June.

The birthday events coincide with the Irish Stampede, a charity 10-2-4K run sponsored by the local Lions Club; the "Tour de Agua" bicycle race; and the "Gotta Love Gravel: Dublin" evening gravel ride sponsored by Dublin Bottling Works. Scores of former students from Dublin primary, middle, and high schools return at this time for the annual Dublin Area Reunion.

The community celebrates its large Hispanic population with events during Cinco de Mayo (in May) and during Hispanic Heritage month is observed in September and October.

The local Dublin Chamber of Commerce sponsors one-third of the tri-angler tournament, with a bass-fishing tournament in July held nearby at Proctor Lake. October safe trick or treating activities seek to ensure safe Halloween activities, and Christmas festivities the first Thursday in December include an annual Christmas parade.

The Double In Cowboy Church holds routine barrel races and other western-related riding events.

Throughout the year, visitors to the community enjoy seeing the five local museums—the Rodeo Heritage Museum, the Dublin Historical Museum, the Dr Pepper Museum, the National Health and Public Safety History Museum, and the renowned Ben Hogan Museum.

== Notable people ==
- Gene Autry was co-owner of a world championship rodeo company and Lightning C Ranch in Dublin, Texas.
- George Andrew Davis, Jr., highly decorated fighter pilot and flying ace was born in Dublin in 1920.
- Johnny Duncan, a popular country singer in the 1970s, was born in Dublin.
- Dustin Hodge, a television producer and writer, graduated from Dublin High School.
- Ben Hogan golfer who created a new category of golf clubs.
- Nicole James, captain and member of the USA Women's Olympic Rugby Team, was born in Dublin.
- H. Lane Mitchell, municipal public works commissioner in Shreveport, Louisiana - born in Dublin.
- Rom Stanifer was an Olympic rifle competitor.
- Slim Willet, musician, songwriter and radio personality, was born in Dublin.

== Gallery ==
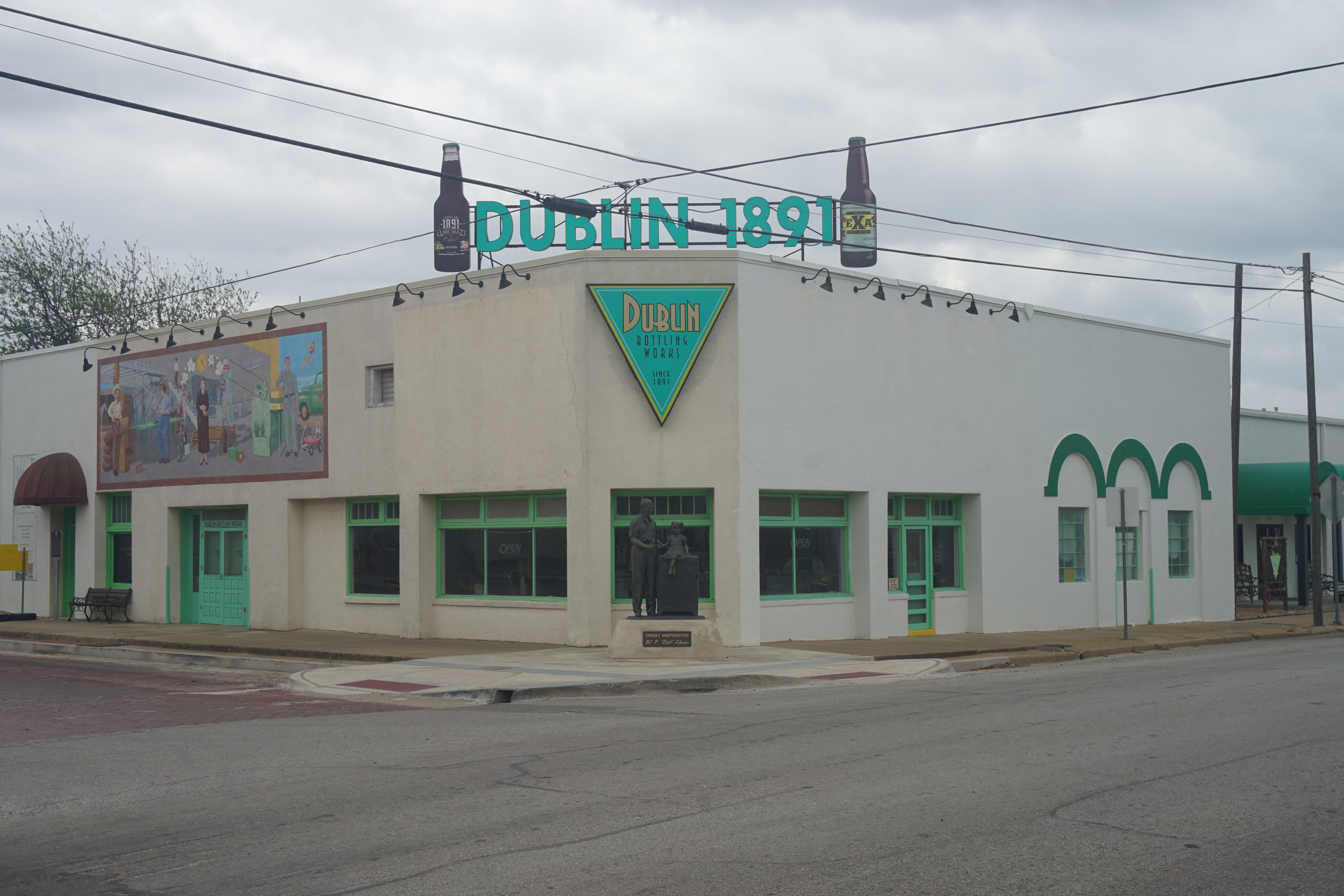
Dublin Bottling Works

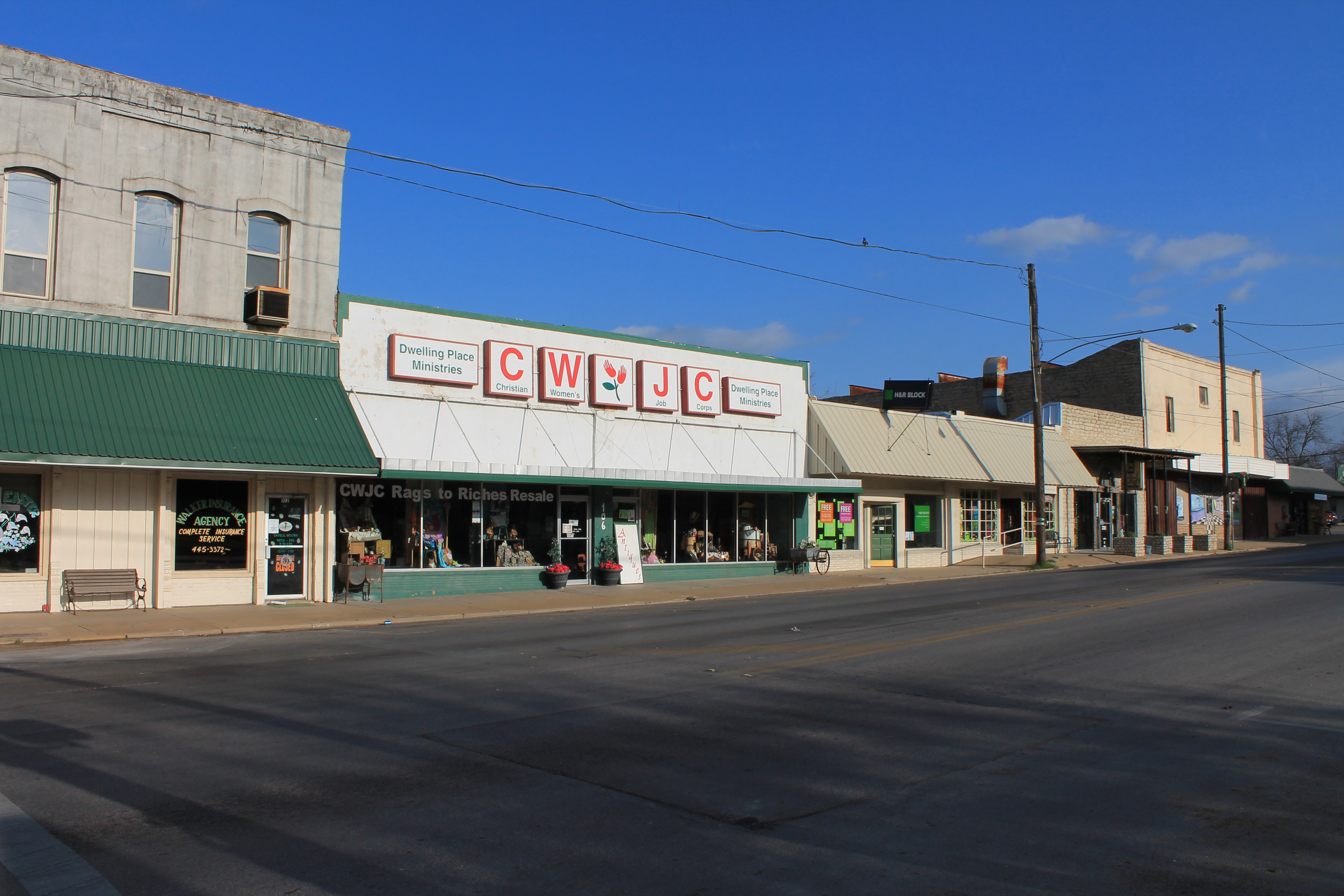
Downtown Dublin

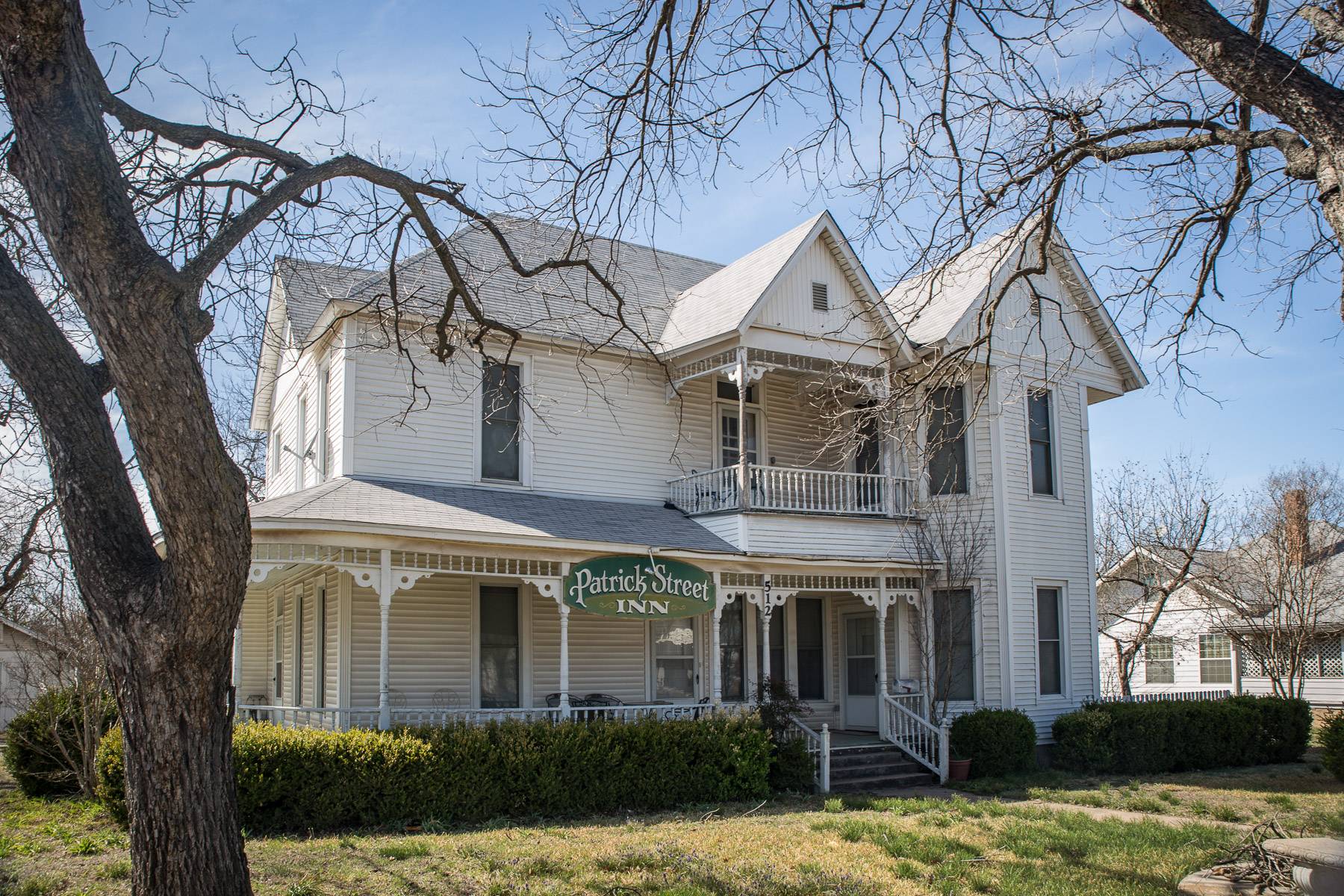
Patric Street Inn

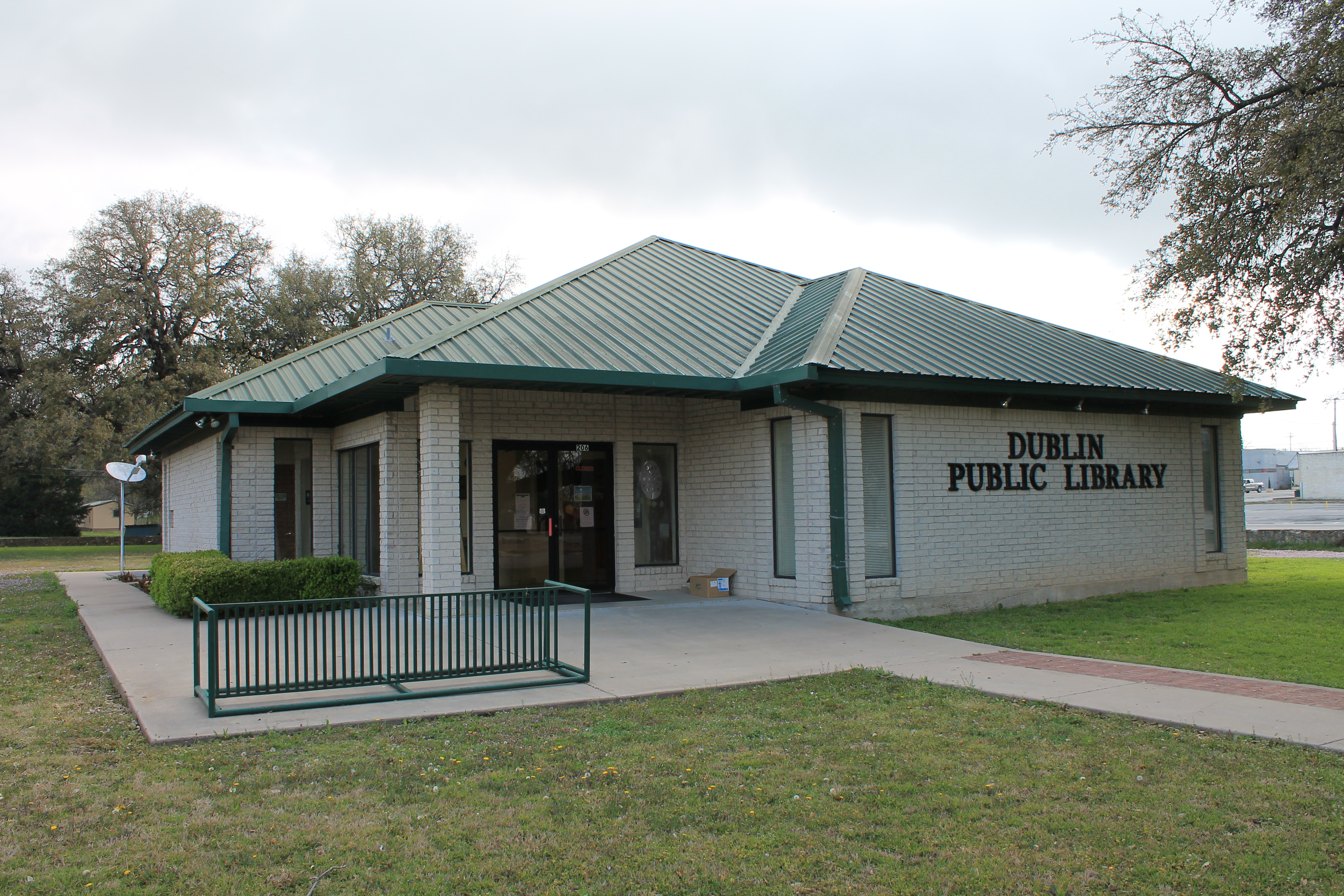
Dublin Public Library

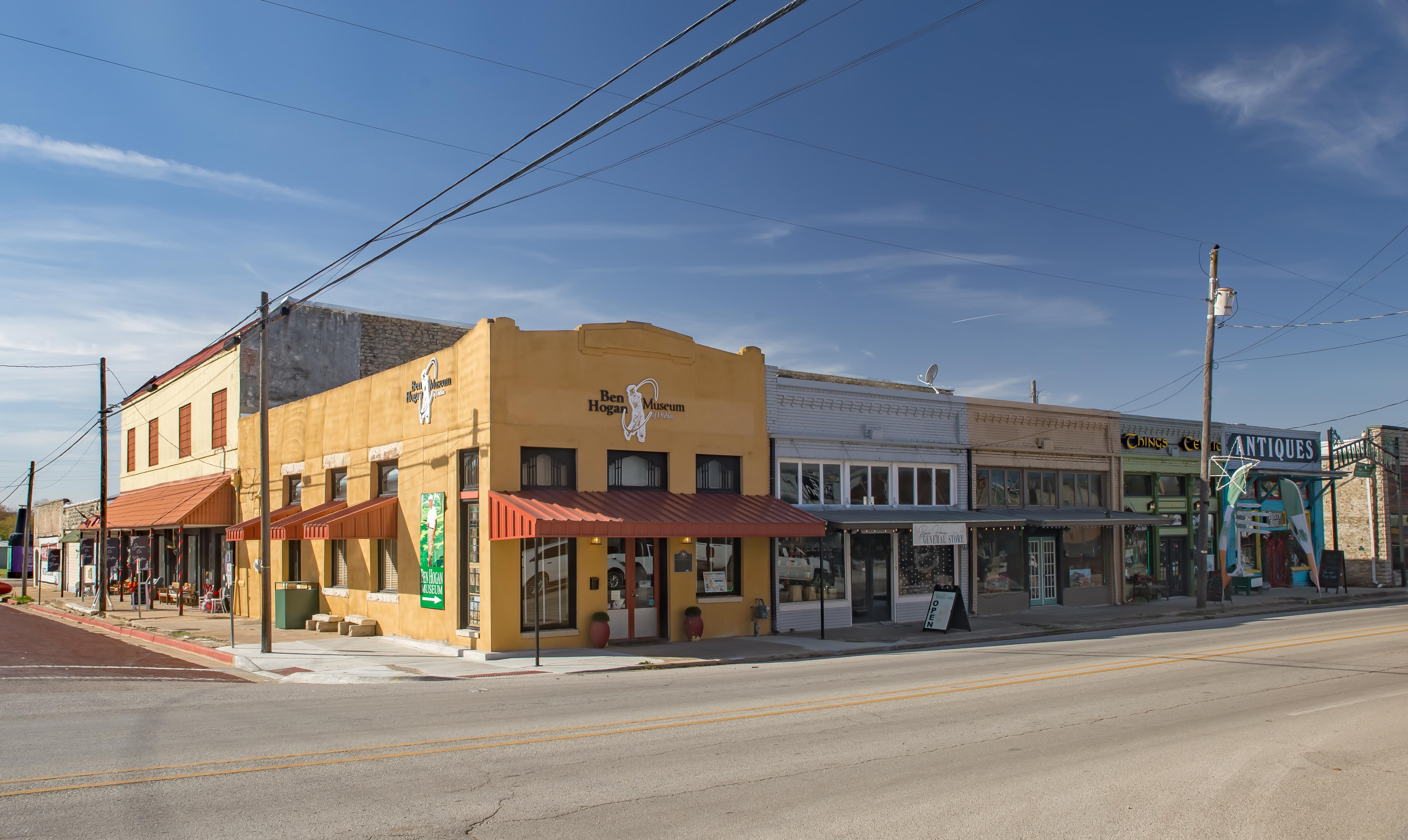
Ben Hogan Museum

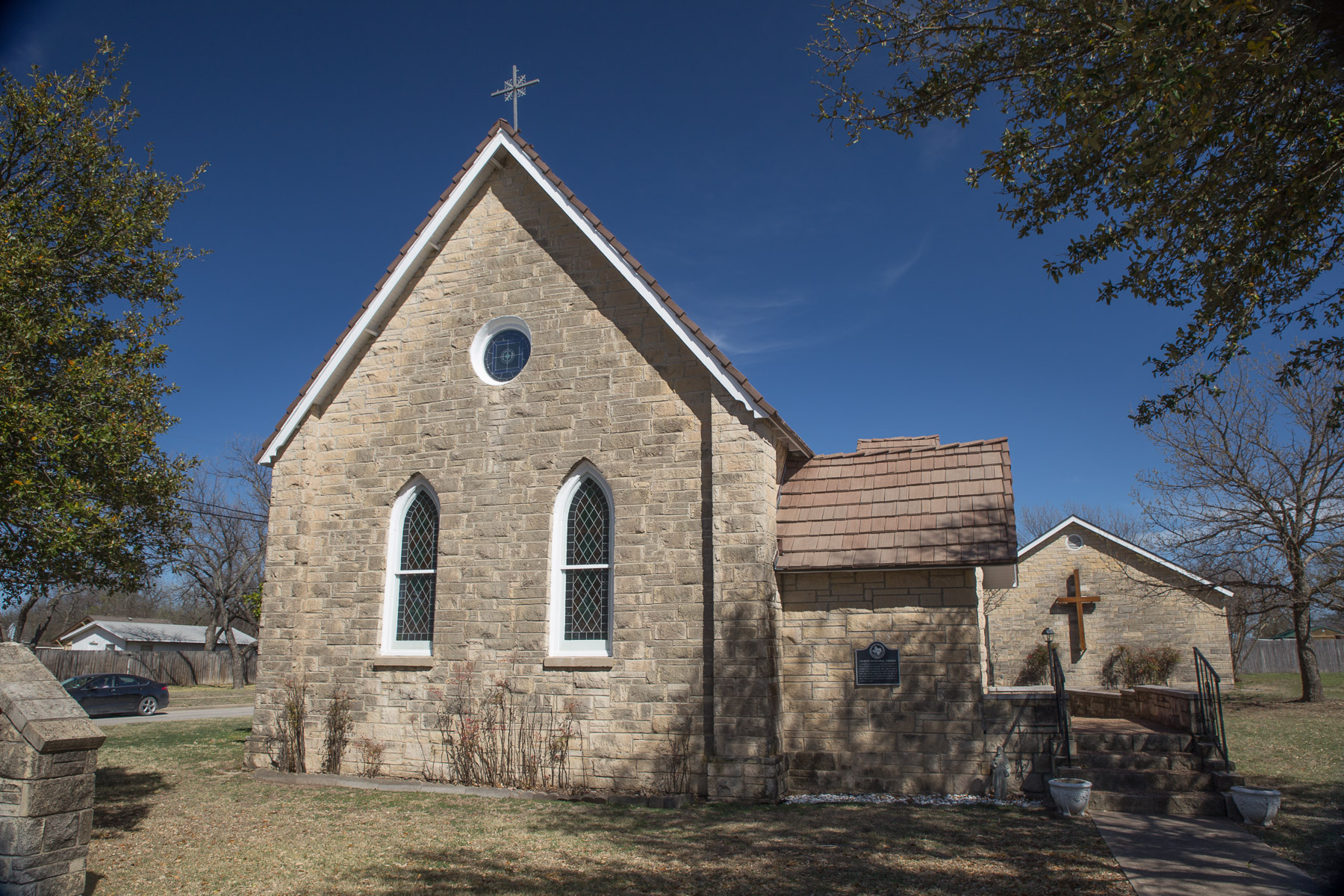
Trinity Anglican Church

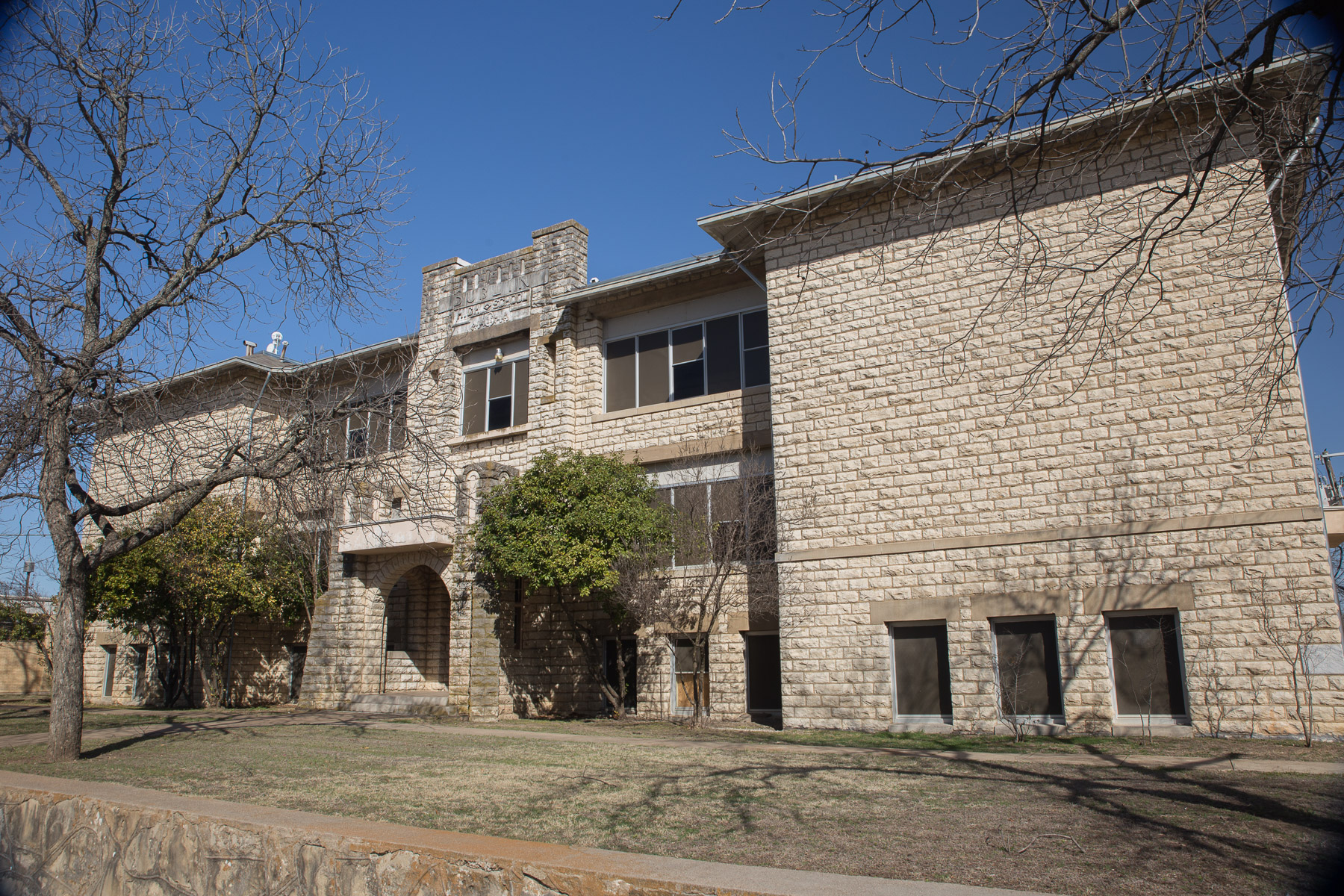
Old Dublin High School

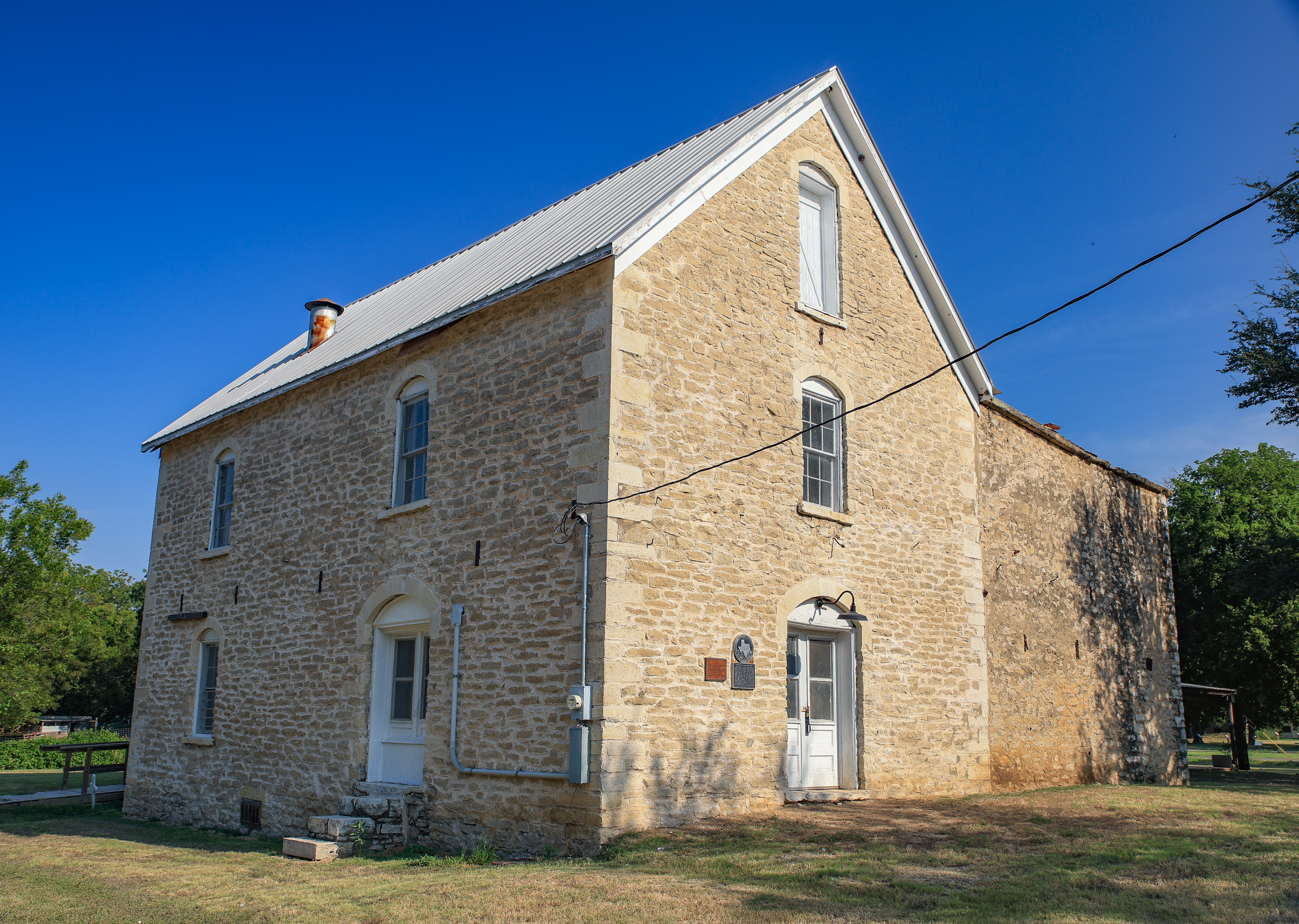
William T. Miller Grist Mill

== See also ==
- List of Irish place names in other countries
