= Cooke County Library =

Library in Gainesville, Texas, United States

- 33°37′24″N 97°08′51″W
- Location: 200 S. Weaver St., Gainesville, TX 76240, United States
- Type: Public
- Established: 1963

Collection
- Size: 117,534

Other information
- Director: Jennifer Johnson-Spence
- Website: cookecountylibrary.org

The Cooke County Library is a public library serving the population of Cooke County, Texas. The library is located in Gainesville, Texas.

== Founding (1903) ==
The first city library in Gainesville, Texas was located in a building known as the Joe Townsley building on North Dixon Street in 1903. The XLI Club added the first collection of 400 books and it was run by Sue McKemie, she was a volunteer that offered to keep the library open one day a week. The library's popularity grew and its hours were extended to each afternoon with a growing list of volunteers. This early library was known as the XLI Club Subscription Library.

In 1907 the Gainesville city council allowed two rooms on the second floor to be used inside city hall as the library. Once established on the second floor the first paid librarian was Gertha Lockard.

Pioneer county librarian Lillian Gunter raised funds alongside the XLI Club for a Carnegie Foundation library between the years 1908–1910. City council agreed to financially support the library in 1912 on an annual basis and to help maintain a Carnegie Library once built. By 1913 the $1,500 needed to secure and purchase a lot for the future library had been raised. The council would continue to provide $1,500 for maintenance purposes after its completion. The XLI Club was presented with a deed by Judge C.C. Potter for a 60 foot by 100 foot plot on the southwest corner of Denton and Main Streets.

An architect from Sherman, Texas named William A. Tackett drew up plans and specifics for the Carnegie Corporation of New York, which was approved, and adopted by the city council of Gainesville. E.M. Wilkens of Fort Worth, Texas, was paid $10,998.00 as the general contractor and building was commenced on December 27, 1913, as noted by Ann Woods in her recounting. The cost of the complete project was $15,000 in 1914.

=== Lillian Gunter ===
Lillian Gunter (1870–1926) hailed from Sivells Bend, Texas. After receiving an education in St. Louis, Missouri, Gunter moved to Gainesville where her father had his plantation and, whereon his death she assumed possession of the establishment from 1892 to 1902.

She would go on to join the XLI Club and started the XLI Club Subscription Library which Gunter managed for 10 years. Once Andrew Carnegie gave his grant to the city, Gunter and her fellow club members raised the funds to buy a site for construction of the Gainesville Public Library.

Though she began work in 1908, Gunter became the first head librarian of the Gainesville Carnegie Public Library upon its completion in 1914. Shortly after its opening Gunter realized she was meeting the needs of the town, however, she was missing the rural population nearby. There was no plan at the time to reach the rural population and shortly after Gunter began working on a way to meet the needs of those in the outlying area.

In an article authored by Laureen Jacobs of the Arlington Public Library in Texas, she writes, "Lillian Gunter referred to herself in her work diary as 'A progressive librarian in rural Texas'".

Jacobs goes on to write, "she [Gunter] felt she needed more education, so she traveled, at her own expense, to the New York State Library School at Albany for a 6 week summer library training course. She also saved a place in the basement of the library for the African-American community of Gainesville. That must have been a very bold move, in her day. Gunter's initial salary was $50 per month'".

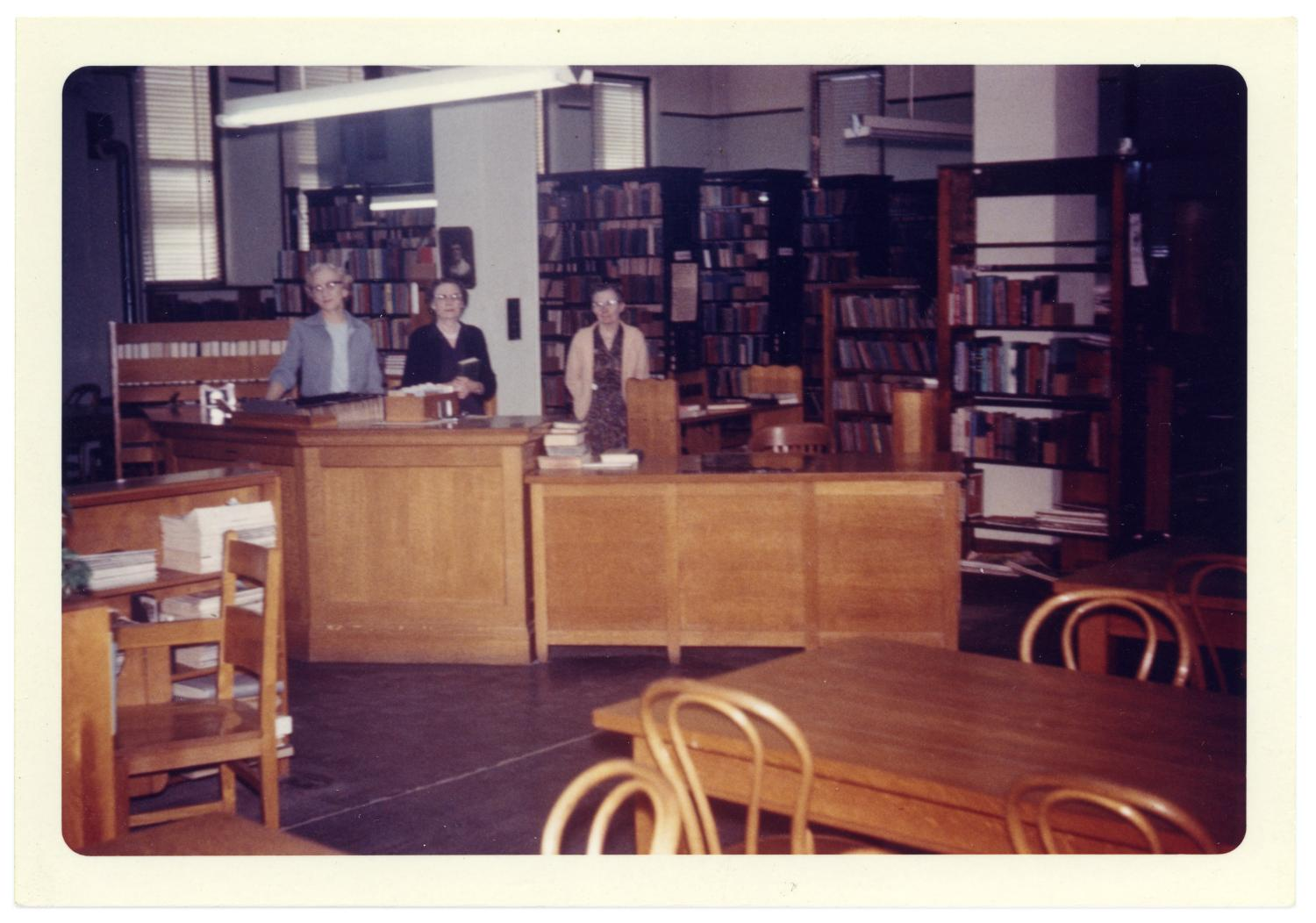
Three library staff members inside the Gainesville Carnegie Public Library

Jacobs learned the above from a diary that Gunter wrote from 1921 to 1924.

While handling librarian duties, Gunter along with county representative George W. Dayton worked on the Texas County Library Law which passed on March 5, 1917, and was signed by Governor of Texas James E. Ferguson. It was Lillian's goal to serve the whole county and not just the immediate area.

To meet her goal she planned the creation of a county library. Though the first county library law would later be repealed, Lillian pushed for a second library law after getting advice from the California State Library during the administration of Milton J. Ferguson. The new law – the 1919 Texas County Library Law – passed and signed by Governor of Texas William P. Hobby.

== Gainesville Carnegie Public Library (1913–1920) ==
The petition for a county library contained that of 1,361 signatures from individuals supporting its creation, which led to a vote for a bond of $125,000 for the new library. Gainesville Carnegie Public Library/The Cooke County Free Library was the second county library, the first being Dallam County Library, under the new Texas County Library Law and would grow to consist of 82 branches and a bookmobile that was in service.

In 1913, a lot was designated for what would be called the Gainesville Carnegie Public Library. By October 10, 1914, the Gainesville Public Library began operations with a collection of 3,500 items. As promised the city council "very wisely have decided to charge only such a fee for its use as will cover janitor service, lights, and fuel making it free in a great many instances".

Lillian Gunter wrote in a script that the site itself was "located on a corner lot on one of the best streets in the city, and one short block from the heart of the business district". The building was described as "very plain one-story and high basement structure of native cream colored pressed brick, dimensions 50' by 60'". Gunter would go on to describe the furniture and Library equipment as "of a most modern character throughout, and designed to give the most perfect library service".

Inside the library was an auditorium, club-room, a museum on the bottom floor, offices, a large reading room reading room on the 2nd floor, and storage rooms. It was noted in a book by Wayne Nason that, "-material for the museum was collected by the librarian-consists of 13 shelves of fossils-early implements and arms, local history books, and manuscripts". There were Native American relics and when counted by Nason in 1928 the manuscripts totaled 262 articles.

On the top floor it was "devoted to library purposes with children's and adults' reading room, stack room, and reference department simply separated from one another by arrangements of furniture".

As for the aforementioned auditorium and club rooms on the bottom floor "there are two club rooms given over to the XLI Club, and an auditorium equipped with chairs and lights, drop curtains and a scenery painted by a local scene painter, and representing a view from the city park".

The club rooms were often used by fellow community groups such as the "young men's club, of the mothers'clubs, the story hour, cooking demonstrations, meeting of the girls' training club, of the school board, and various other affairs". It was noted that these club rooms were open to public use as to "uplift the community and endear the public library to the people".

During the initial years of the library's operation, Cooke County Representative George W. Dayton and Lillian Gunter began crafting the Texas County Library Law in 1915. That same year at the October, 1915 Texas Library Association conference in San Antonio, Texas-president of the association Elizabeth West "paid tribute to Miss Gunter". It's also noted that while there "this head of the Carnegie Library of San Antonio urge the Library Association to earnestly get at the task of furthering library interests in Texas". Though the law passed originally in 1917, it was repealed. With the newer and reworked Texas County Library Law of 1919, the law was petitioned in 1920 and led to a county library being established. Later, in 1921, the Gainesville Carnegie Public Library was renamed to the Cooke County Free Library in the spirit of the new library law.

== Cooke County Free Library (1921–1962) ==
In 1921 the Library reflected inward and made changes to their checkout system and stated "the new reader was given an application blank, which, when properly filled out, was numbered and filed both alphabetically and numerically". This helped with farmers forgetting their cards. J. James Brown goes on to tell that if a farmer "-had forgotten it, he gave his name. The files had been so carefully placed for convenience that it was a small matter to find his number from his name".

At the 1922 State Fair of Texas the Gainesville Chamber of Commerce financed a library display for the exhibition that was held in Dallas. The exhibit contained "miniature town, farm and countryside, with a book on each subject illustrated in an endeavor to show the universal application of a country library service".

In October 1924, the Carnegie Endowment for International Peace presented the county library with "52 volumes of travel biography, letters, and treatises on international conditions". The corporation required that there be a section of shelves devoted to "The International Mind Alcove" area as it was expected that the Carnegie organization would add books to this section from "time to time".

The University of Texas Geological Camp gifted the library a county wide map that "was a unique and interesting exhibit, showing the identifying formations for each of the 12 geological horizons in Cooke County". By the beginning of November 1924, the first oil well was established and men flocked to town to work the site. The Library was now in possession of the only geological map of Cooke County in existence. During its first month on display 114 men visited "The Oil Alcove" in the library. The head librarian gave it that name and then proceeded to take "all the maps of the county and adjacent territory and all bulletins and books on geology" and moved them to the front of the library to be part of "The Oil Alcove".

By 1925 a new feature was moved to the library called "The Black and Grand Prairies of Texas" which drew a renewed attention from oil prospectors. The item was a land survey of Love County, Oklahoma and it also contained a collection of "some 10 or 15 well logs" of sites that have been previously drilled in and around Cooke County.

In 1935 the Library was presented a portrait of Andrew Carnegie created by Luis Moya which was framed for permanent display as part of Andrew Carnegie's Centennial Celebration held by the Carnegie Corporation.

The 1937 annual report showed that the libraries' growth were hitting new highs with the totals as follows: 18,703 volumes, a circulation of 76,221 books, and the registration of 9,379 patrons. This was an increase in circulation of 10,908 over the previous year. By 1941 annual report show that the Library's circulation hit 131,086 with 10,784 registered borrowers.

=== Cynthia Wayne Martin ===
Cynthia Wayne Martin took over for Lillian Gunter upon her death in 1926. Under Martin more branches appeared and branches already in existence were updated. Her plan for further development involved acquiring a bookmobile that would travel to branch locations, schools, and businesses. The bookmobile was first manned by Librarian Carrie Hudspeath and by a Mr. Emmett Cameron. The mobile was able to carry some 2,000 books to and from locations. Notably, Martin helped the county schools acquire books by combining funds between the library and the schools, most went to the bookmobile to travel between other stations and branches that serviced the schools' population.

Over time, this new library on wheels led to the closing of many stations and branches as stated by Librarian Ann Woods in a later record. At the time schools were consolidating while several communities were dwindling, and due to the Gilmer-Aikman Bill in 1950–1951 which required schools to have their own onsite library. After the need for the bookmobile diminished, it was retired.

Martin was also allowed to manage the training of all library personnel under the new Works Progress Administration's act, a plan that was put into action by President Franklin D. Roosevelt on May 6, 1935.

Martin retired on January 10, 1939, and Head Librarian Olna Catis Boaz assumed leadership of the library.

=== Olna Catis Boaz ===
By 1939 the library began to face changes. "-the W.P.A.[Works Progress Administration] project went out of existence. Library service was hampered and county branches showed drops in circulation". Head Librarian Olna Boaz saw a need and along with fellow librarian Carrie Hudspeath-drove the bookmobile to library stations and branches themselves.

Mrs. Boaz talked up the bookmobile and took every chance to mention the "library on wheels" to fellow librarians at the Texas Library Association Meetings. 1940 showed "an increase in service to schools over former facilities". However, when the Gilmer-Aiken Bill became effective in 1950–1951, schools were required to have libraries built on site. The choice to redistribute the books was made and the bookmobile became non-existent.

1942 saw the growth of Camp Howze as World War II raged on. With Camp Howze expanding population the "branches at Mossville, Warrens Bend, and Marysville, and Mount Hope were closed and the books were returned to the main library due to the army camp". A donation of "nearly 400" books was received from a drive held in Dallas and these books were put to use due in part to the library being "in a defense area and having insufficient resources for the severe strain that was put on it". The library even expanded hours till 8:00 pm with the increased population held at Camp Howze.

The post-war plan was to found and establish a new library. This would mean an increase in budget to meet the American Library Association's guidelines as to meet the requirements for zones that had a population that was under 25,000. At the time it was found that the "present building was entirely inadequate even for present needs". The plan pushed to reconstruct the "old building" for office of other use while commencing construction on a new campus for the library.

By 1946 Mrs. Boaz had gone back to school for teaching and later resigned and went to teach in Denton, Texas. Mrs. Hudspeth was made the next Head Librarian and continued down the path for a new library to be constructed.

== Cooke County Library (1963–present) ==
After voters agreed to a bond for a new library building, construction began in 1962. Cooke County Library opened its doors on June 29, 1963, in Gainesville, Texas at 200 South Weaver and to this day is the current site of the library. The Gainesville Carnegie Public Library now serves as a building for the Arts Council and the Butterfield Stage Theater. The contract for construction was given to Jack Owens in the fall of 1962 and the architects chosen for the construction were Pond and Bellamy of Wichita Falls, Texas.

=== Cooke County Library Association and the Cooke County Bibliography Project ===
In October 1985 Cooke County Library Association (which consisted of library employees and its Friends of the Library) had its first meeting and decided to work alongside the Cooke County Sesquicentennial Committee and the Cultural Affairs Committee to compile a Cooke County Bibliography as a "special project" covering a list of sources and peoples' heritage that would be accessible to future generations and located at both the Cooke County Library and the Morton Museum in Gainesville, Texas. At the time there were three separate, smaller reports that covered happenings, families, and places. The groups decided to place these three reports as a foundation for a bigger project that covered all of Cooke County. Copies of the report were passed out to libraries within the county. The names of Cooke County librarians that assisted with the project can be found on the last page of the Cooke County Bibliography Special Project for the Sesquicentennial.

Listed below are the names of Cooke County librarians that assisted with the special project and they are written as shown on the last page of the report:

- Sylvia Bayer
- Ann Cogburn
- Sandy Corbett
- Joy Davidson
- Sylvia Lyons
- Sandra Moore
- Frances Moses
- Mary Moster
- Sister Carmelita Myers
- Patsy Sloan
- Mary Townsley
- Patsy Wilson
- Ann Woods

==== Ann Woods ====
Mrs. Ann Woods, Head Librarian of the Cooke County Library took over for Mrs. Cora Neely in 1977. In the book Cooke County History: Past and Present, Woods detailed the founding and growth of the Cooke County Library from 1903 to 1977 when she took over as the Head Librarian, leaving behind a record of library events that had not been previously recorded since 1945 by Hazel Self. Woods also assisted the Cooke County Library Association, Cooke County Sesquicentennial Committee, Cultural Affairs Committee and other Cooke County Librarians with the Cooke County Bibliography Project.

===== List of librarians =====
This list was compiled using the dates from Ann Wood's entries in Cooke County History: Past and Present and online data.

- Sue McKemie (1907, first recorded volunteer librarian)
- Gertha Lockard (1907–1908, first paid librarian)
- Lillian Gunter (1908–1926, first head librarian)
- Cynthia Wayne Martin (1926–1939)
- Olna Oatis Boaz (1939–1947)
- Carrie Hudspeath (1947–1965)
- Cora Neely (1966–1970)
- Helen Neu (1970–1971)
- Cora Neely (1971–1977)
- Ann Woods (1977–2004)
- Jennifer Johnson-Spence (2005–present)

== Historical branches of the Cooke County Free Library ==
Historically, the Cooke County Free Library once consisted of 82 library branches and school stations. However, Hazel Self's 1945 graduate report mentions there were at one point 91 branches in service. By the time of this 1945 report, self-describes 25 library locations were left from a liquidation of county branches.

This following list comprises branch locations and the coinciding opening day/year. The following branch names are written as observed in Self's graduate report in 1945.

- Sivells Bend (March 30, 1921)
- Valley View (April 17, 1921)
- Hood (April 25, 1921)
- Woodbine (May 25, 1921)
- Era (June 21, 1921)
- Callisburg (June 21, 1921)
- Marysville (July 28, 1921)
- Bulcher (July 28, 1921)
- Muenster (July 28, 1921)
- Myra (July 28, 1921)
- Rosston (October 12, 1921)
- Walnut Bend (October 13, 1921)
- Hemming (November 16, 1921)
- Lindsay (November 19, 1921)
- Dye (December 16, 1921)
- Warren's Bend (1921)
- Van Slyke (May 16, 1922)
- Salem (May 23, 1922)
- Bloomfield (June 26, 1922)
- Tyler's Bluff (August 9, 1922)
- Burns City (1923)
- Delaware Bend (1923)
- Concord (1923)
- Mt. Hope (1925)
- Dexter (1926)
- Era 2nd location (1926)
- Mt. Hope 2nd location (1926)

The following sites do not have dates attributed to them but are shown on Self's report pages 31–32 of branch locations.

- Burton
- Canady
- Freemound
- Hays
- Lemons
- Leo
- Loving
- Mountain Springs
- Oak Dale
- Oak Valley
- Red Rock
- Red Ware
- Ross Point
- Six Mill
- Spring Grove
- Springhill
- Union Grove
- West View
- Whaley Chapel
