= List of Storm Prediction Center extremely critical days =

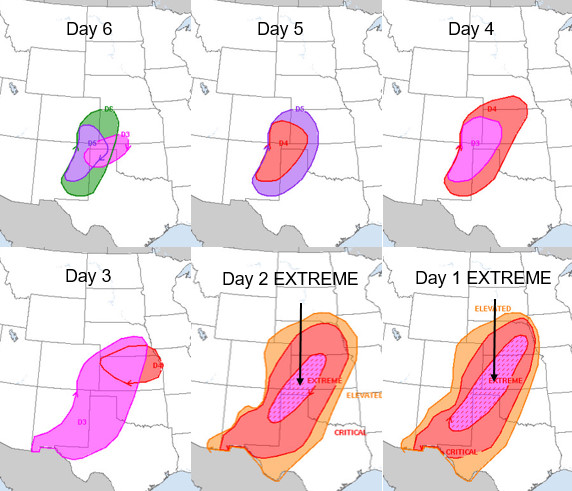
Progression of a well-anticipated extremely critical event across the Central Plains on March 6, 2017. This event produced wildfires that burned 1,200,000 acres of land, and killed seven people.

An extremely critical fire weather event is the greatest threat level issued by the NWS Storm Prediction Center (SPC) for wildfire events in the United States. On the scale from one to three, an extremely critical is a level three; thus, these outlooks are issued only when forecasters at the SPC are confident of extremely dangerous wildfire conditions on a given day, and are typically reserved for the most extreme events. They are only issued for either Day 2 (with the event occurring the following day) or for Day 1 (on the day of the event). In contrast with high risk outlooks for severe weather outbreaks, extremely critical outlooks are commonly issued for Day 2. This is due to the fact that the conditions required for volatile wildfire spread are easier to predict well in advance than the conditions required for a major tornado outbreak or derecho. Similar to high risk outlooks, extremely critical outlooks also cannot be issued for Day 3 of the outlook period.

== Extremely critical days ==
=== 2000–2009 ===
Storm Prediction Center Extremely Critical Fire Weather Events – 2000–2009 (Note: All values include fires that took place outside of the extremely critical area(s). Burned area values are listed in acres. Fatality totals only include direct fire-related deaths that occurred on the respective extremely critical days.)
Date	Year	Region	Burned area	Fatalities	Outlook	Notes
May 11	2000	Arizona, New Mexico	43,000 (Note: Number of acres burned for entire event which occurred over a multi-day period.)	0		Cerro Grande Fire
May 15	2000	Nevada, Utah, Colorado, Arizona, New Mexico	43,000	0		Cerro Grande Fire
May 16	2000	Wyoming, Utah, Colorado, Arizona, New Mexico, Texas, Oklahoma	43,000	0		Cerro Grande Fire
May 17	2000	Colorado, Arizona, New Mexico, Nebraska, Kansas, Texas, Oklahoma	43,000	0		Cerro Grande Fire
May 24	2000	Mississippi, Alabama, Georgia, South Carolina, Florida	—N/a	0		One of only two extremely critical areas issued east of the Mississippi River, the other was issued on May 12, 2008
June 7	2000	Nevada, Arizona, Utah	—N/a	0		
June 8	2000	Nevada, Arizona, Utah	—N/a	0		
June 19	2000	Wyoming, Colorado, Utah	—N/a	0		
July 23	2000	Wyoming, Colorado, Utah, Montana, Idaho	2,200,000 (Note: Approximate total number of acres burned for multiple wildfire events between June and September 2000.)	0		Idaho-Montana wildfires of Summer 2000
July 31	2000	Washington, Oregon, Montana, Idaho	2,200,000	0		Idaho-Montana wildfires of Summer 2000
August 1	2000	Wyoming, Montana, Idaho	2,200,000	0		Idaho-Montana wildfires of Summer 2000
August 3	2000	California, Oregon, Nevada, Wyoming, Montana, Idaho	2,200,000	0		Idaho-Montana wildfires of Summer 2000
August 11	2000	Wyoming, Montana, Idaho	2,200,000	0		Idaho-Montana wildfires of Summer 2000
August 26	2000	Wyoming, Montana, Idaho	2,200,000	0		Idaho-Montana wildfires of Summer 2000
August 27	2000	Wyoming, Montana, Idaho, South Dakota	2,200,000	0		Idaho-Montana wildfires of Summer 2000
August 29	2000	Wyoming, Montana, Idaho	2,200,000	0		Idaho-Montana wildfires of Summer 2000
September 19	2000	South Central U.S.	—N/a	0		
September 21	2000	New Mexico, Colorado, Kansas, Oklahoma, Texas	—N/a	0		
October 21	2000	California	—N/a	0		
October 22	2000	California	—N/a	0		
November 7	2000	California	—N/a	0		
December 17	2000	California	—N/a	0		
December 18	2000	California	—N/a	0		
December 25	2000	California	—N/a	0		
January 2	2001	California	—N/a	0		
January 3	2001	California	10,353	0		Viejas Fire
April 10	2001	New Mexico, Texas	—N/a	0		
April 22	2001	New Mexico, Texas	—N/a	0		
July 28	2001	Idaho, Wyoming	4,600	0		Green Knoll Fire
September 5	2001	Eastern Great Basin region	14,288	0		Darby Fire
April 20	2002	New Mexico, Texas	—N/a	0		
May 1	2002	New Mexico, Texas	—N/a	0		
May 7	2002	Central Rocky Mountains region	—N/a	0		
June 3	2002	New Mexico, Arizona, Colorado	—N/a	0		
June 8	2002	Western U.S.	138,114	0		Hayman Fire
June 9	2002	Western U.S.	138,114	0		Hayman Fire
September 15	2002	Nevada	—N/a	0		
January 6	2003	California	900	0		Pacific Fire
April 2	2003	Arizona, Colorado, Utah	—N/a	0		
May 3	2003	Arizona, New Mexico	—N/a	0		
June 23	2003	Colorado, New Mexico, Utah	84,750	0		Aspen Fire
May 10	2004	Utah	—N/a	0		
May 11	2004	Southwestern U.S.	—N/a	0		
March 29	2005	New Mexico, Texas	—N/a	0		
November 18	2005	California	4,000	0		School Canyon Fire
November 27	2005	New Mexico, Oklahoma, Texas	9,600	0		Velma Fire
January 1	2006	New Mexico, Oklahoma, Texas	303,570	2		Texas-Oklahoma wildfires of 2005–06
January 3	2006	Central U.S.	—N/a	0		Texas-Oklahoma wildfires of 2005–06
January 7	2006	New Mexico, Oklahoma, Texas	—N/a	0		Texas-Oklahoma wildfires of 2005–06
January 8	2006	Southern U.S.	—N/a	0		Texas-Oklahoma wildfires of 2005–06
January 12	2006	Oklahoma, Texas	39,173	0		Texas-Oklahoma wildfires of 2005–06
January 14	2006	Oklahoma, Texas	—N/a	0		Texas-Oklahoma wildfires of 2005–06
January 15	2006	Oklahoma, Texas	—N/a	0		Texas-Oklahoma wildfires of 2005–06
January 23	2006	California	—N/a	0		
February 7	2006	California	1,200	0		Orange County Fire
February 8	2006	California	1,200	0		Orange County Fire
March 8	2006	New Mexico, Oklahoma, Texas	—N/a	0		
March 10	2006	Central U.S.	—N/a	0		
March 11	2006	New Mexico, Texas	—N/a	0		
March 12	2006	Central U.S.	1,102,044	12		Texas-Oklahoma wildfires of 2005–06
April 6	2006	New Mexico, Oklahoma, Texas	119,846	0		Texas-Oklahoma wildfires of 2005–06
April 15	2006	Central U.S.	23,135	0		Texas-Oklahoma wildfires of 2005–06
May 27	2006	Southwestern U.S.	—N/a	0		
June 14	2006	Southwestern U.S.	4,270	0		June 2006 Colorado wildfires
June 15	2006	Arizona, New Mexico	—N/a	0		
August 29	2006	Northwestern U.S.	144,876	0		Tripod Complex, Tatoosh Complex, and Cedar Creek fires
August 30	2006	Idaho, Montana, Wyoming	76,651	0		Middle Fork Complex, Trail Creek, Potato, and Zane fires
November 15	2006	Texas	—N/a	0		
January 8	2007	California	20	0		Malibu Fire
February 24	2007	Texas	—N/a	0		
February 28	2007	New Mexico, Texas	—N/a	0		
June 5	2007	Arizona, Nevada, Utah	—N/a	0		
June 6	2007	Arizona, New Mexico	—N/a	0		
July 18	2007	Nevada	652,016	0		Murphy Complex Fire
October 21	2007	California	33,195	1		2007 California wildfires
October 22	2007	California	234,466	0		2007 California wildfires
October 23	2007	California	146,903	2		2007 California wildfires
January 29	2008	Texas	37,000	0		2008 Texas wildfires
January 31	2008	Texas	37,000	0		2008 Texas wildfires
February 25	2008	Texas	377,568	1		2008 Texas wildfires
March 14	2008	Arizona, New Mexico, Texas	263,375	0		2008 Texas wildfires
March 16	2008	New Mexico, Texas	—N/a	0		2008 Texas wildfires
March 18	2008	Texas	—N/a	0		2008 Texas wildfires
March 20	2008	Kansas, Oklahoma, Texas	5,000	0		2008 Texas wildfires
April 3	2008	New Mexico, Texas	—N/a	0		2008 Texas wildfires
April 9	2008	New Mexico, Texas	—N/a	0		2008 Texas wildfires
April 10	2008	Arizona, New Mexico, Texas	—N/a	0		2008 Texas wildfires
April 16	2008	New Mexico, Texas	—N/a	0		2008 Texas wildfires
April 30	2008	Arizona, New Mexico, Texas	2,000	0		2008 Texas wildfires and X Fire
May 1	2008	New Mexico, Texas	—N/a	0		2008 Texas wildfires
May 12	2008	Florida, Southwestern U.S.	—N/a	0		2008 Texas wildfires; one of only two extremely critical areas issued east of the Mississippi River, the other was issued on May 24, 2000
May 13	2008	New Mexico, Texas	—N/a	0		2008 Texas wildfires
May 21	2008	Arizona, New Mexico	—N/a	0		
June 4	2008	Arizona, New Mexico	—N/a	0		
June 5	2008	New Mexico, Texas	—N/a	0		2008 Texas wildfires
June 11	2008	New Mexico, Oklahoma, Texas	—N/a	0		2008 Texas wildfires
February 10	2009	Texas	—N/a	0		
February 17	2009	Central U.S.	—N/a	0		
March 5	2009	Central U.S.	—N/a	0		
March 23	2009	Kansas, Oklahoma, Texas	—N/a	0		
March 26	2009	Arizona, New Mexico, Texas	—N/a	0		
April 1	2009	New Mexico, Texas	—N/a	0		
April 9	2009	New Mexico, Oklahoma, Texas	235,792	4		April 2009 Texas wildfires
June 6	2009	Arizona, New Mexico	—N/a	0		
August 6	2009	Arizona, Nevada, Utah	—N/a	0		
August 7	2009	Southwestern U.S.	—N/a	0		

=== 2010–2019 ===
Storm Prediction Center Extremely Critical Fire Weather Events – 2010–2019
Date	Year	Region	Burned area	Fatalities	Outlook	Notes
March 26	2010	New Mexico, Texas	—N/a	0		
April 1	2010	Central U.S.	—N/a	0		
April 29	2010	New Mexico, Texas	—N/a	0		
May 10	2010	New Mexico, Oklahoma, Texas	—N/a	0		
February 27	2011	New Mexico, Oklahoma, Texas	262,434	0		2011 Texas wildfires
March 7	2011	New Mexico, Texas	—N/a	0		2011 Texas wildfires
March 8	2011	Texas	—N/a	0		2011 Texas wildfires
March 21	2011	Southwestern and Central U.S.	—N/a	0		2011 Texas wildfires
March 22	2011	Kansas, Oklahoma, Texas	12,556	0		2011 Texas wildfires
April 3	2011	Southwestern and Central U.S.	19,883	0		2011 Texas wildfires
April 9	2011	Central U.S	582,615	1		2011 Texas wildfires
April 10	2011	Kansas, Oklahoma, Texas	—N/a	0		2011 Texas wildfires
April 14	2011	New Mexico, Oklahoma, Texas	85,287	0		2011 Texas wildfires
April 15	2011	Oklahoma, Texas	50,321	1		2011 Texas wildfires
April 26	2011	New Mexico, Texas	50,235	0		2011 Texas wildfires
April 29	2011	New Mexico, Oklahoma, Texas	—N/a	0		2011 Texas wildfires
May 9	2011	Southwestern and Central U.S.	—N/a	0		2011 Texas wildfires
May 24	2011	New Mexico, Oklahoma, Texas	127,732	0		2011 Texas wildfires
May 29	2011	New Mexico, Texas	—N/a	0		2011 Texas wildfires
May 30	2011	Central U.S.	—N/a	0		2011 Texas wildfires
June 6	2011	Arizona	538,049	0		Wallow Fire
June 19	2011	Southwestern U.S.	538,049	0		2011 Texas wildfires and Wallow Fire
June 29	2011	Nevada	156,293	0		Las Conchas Fire
November 2	2011	California	—N/a	0		
March 1	2012	New Mexico	—N/a	0		
March 7	2012	New Mexico	—N/a	0		
March 18	2012	Nebraska, South Dakota	—N/a	0		
March 26	2012	Colorado, Nebraska, Wyoming	4,140	3		Lower North Fork Fire
May 23	2012	Arizona, New Mexico	297,845	0		Whitewater-Baldy Complex Fire
May 26	2012	New Mexico	297,845	0		Whitewater-Baldy Complex Fire
February 25	2013	Texas	—N/a	0		
December 29	2013	California	—N/a	0		
April 3	2014	New Mexico, Texas	—N/a	0		
April 26	2014	Colorado, Kansas, New Mexico, Oklahoma and Texas	—N/a	0		
May 6	2014	Kansas, Oklahoma and Texas	—N/a	0		
May 7	2014	Colorado, Kansas, New Mexico, Oklahoma and Texas	—N/a	0		
May 11	2014	Oklahoma, Texas	2,583	0		Double Diamond Fire
June 14	2014	Arizona, New Mexico	—N/a	0		
June 16	2014	Arizona, Colorado, New Mexico, Utah	—N/a	0		
June 17	2014	Arizona, Colorado, New Mexico, Utah	14,712	0		Assayii Lake Fire
April 8	2015	Colorado, New Mexico, Texas	—N/a	0		
April 14	2015	South Dakota	—N/a	0		
February 18	2016	Colorado, Kansas, New Mexico, Oklahoma, Texas	40,000	0		February 2016 Texas-Oklahoma wildfires
March 22	2016	Arizona, Colorado, Kansas, New Mexico, Oklahoma and Texas	367,620	0		Anderson Creek Fire
March 23	2016	New Mexico, Oklahoma and Texas	367,620	0		Anderson Creek Fire
April 5	2016	Kansas, New Mexico, Oklahoma and Texas	55,308	0		350 Complex Fire
November 17	2016	Colorado, Kansas, New Mexico, Oklahoma, Texas	—N/a	0		
February 23	2017	Colorado, Kansas, New Mexico, Oklahoma, Texas	1,812	0		2 Mile Lane, 96, and 141st fires
February 28	2017	New Mexico, Oklahoma, Texas	10,700	0		February 2017 Texas wildfires
March 6	2017	Colorado, Kansas, Nebraska, New Mexico, Oklahoma, Texas	1,200,000	7		March 2017 Great Plains wildfires
March 23	2017	Colorado, New Mexico, Texas	38,500	0		Rankin Ranch Road and Green Ranch fires
March 31	2017	New Mexico, Texas	—N/a	0		
December 4	2017	California	141,531	0		December 2017 Southern California wildfires
December 5	2017	California	141,531	0		December 2017 Southern California wildfires
December 6	2017	California	141,531	1		December 2017 Southern California wildfires
December 7	2017	California	141,531	0		December 2017 Southern California wildfires
March 4	2018	New Mexico, Colorado, Texas, Oklahoma	575	0		Forest Ridge Fire and Coyote Canyon Fire
March 18	2018	New Mexico, Texas	9,250	0		March 2018 Texas-Oklahoma wildfires
March 23	2018	New Mexico, Texas, Oklahoma, Kansas, Colorado	3,450	0		March 2018 Texas-Oklahoma wildfires
April 12	2018	New Mexico, Texas, Oklahoma, Kansas, Colorado	12,700	1		April 2018 Great Plains wildfires, including the Rhea Fire.
April 13	2018	New Mexico, Texas, Oklahoma	261,700	1		April 2018 Great Plains wildfires – The first day to be given a "historically critical" designation on the Red Flag Threat Index (RFTI). (Note: The Red Flag Threat Index (RFTI) is a fire weather index that was developed in 2011, with values from 0-10 that rates the climatological rarity of combined relative humidity and wind combinations. Historically Critical values of 9 or 10 can only be reached when either relative humidity or wind speed exceed a ten year observational data set.)
April 17	2018	New Mexico, Texas, Oklahoma	468,365	0		April 2018 Great Plains wildfires – Outlook included enhanced warning: "Dangerous, life-threatening fire weather conditions are likely". PDS Red Flag Warning #709 was issued for parts of New Mexico and Texas at 2005Z the day before. Forecasters indicated that the potential for the rapid spread of wildfires was at its highest level in more than ten years. This was only the second day on record to be given the "historically critical" designation on the Red Flag Threat Index (RFTI).
April 19	2018	Arizona, New Mexico	125	0		April 2018 Arizona-New Mexico wildfires
September 15	2018	Utah, Nevada	86,107	0		Pole Creek and Bald Mountain wildfires
October 15	2018	California	—N/a	0		
November 8	2018	California	256,316	85 (Note: All 85 fatalities were caused by the Camp Fire.)		Woolsey, Hill, Camp, and Nurse wildfires; Deadliest extremely critical day on record. (Note: The 102 fatalities associated with the wildfires in Hawaii on August 8, 2023 are excluded, due to the fact that only critical fire conditions were forecasted for that day.)
November 9	2018	California	256,316	2		Woolsey, Hill, Camp, and Nurse wildfires
November 11	2018	California	256,316	0		Woolsey, Hill, Camp, and Nurse wildfires
November 12	2018	California	256,316	0		Woolsey, Hill, Camp, and Nurse wildfires
November 13	2018	California	256,316	1		Woolsey, Hill, Camp, and Nurse wildfires
April 10	2019	New Mexico, Texas	1,800	0		267 Fire
October 9	2019	California	14,449	0		Early October 2019 California wildfires
October 10	2019	California	14,449	3		Early October 2019 California wildfires
October 11	2019	California	14,449	0		Early October 2019 California wildfires
October 24	2019	California	98,366	0		Late October 2019 California wildfires
October 25	2019	California	98,366	0		Late October 2019 California wildfires
October 27	2019	California	98,366	0		Late October 2019 California wildfires
October 28	2019	California	98,366	0		Late October 2019 California wildfires
October 29	2019	California	98,366	0		Late October 2019 California wildfires
October 30	2019	California	98,366	0		Late October 2019 California wildfires
October 31	2019	California	98,366	0		Late October 2019 California wildfires – First and only occurrence of five consecutive extremely critical days

=== 2020–present ===
Storm Prediction Center Extremely Critical Fire Weather Events – 2020–2026
Date	Year	Region	Burned area	Fatalities	Outlook	Notes
June 7	2020	Colorado, New Mexico	2,083	0		Wilson Crossing, Tadpole, and Bent's Fort fires
September 2	2020	Montana	100,000	0		Huff, Bobcat, and Snider fires
September 7	2020	Oregon, Washington	1,000,000	0		North Complex Fire and September 2020 Oregon and Washington wildfires – Eric Johnson, deputy fire staff for Northwest Oregon Fire Management, stated that "the fire weather forecasted is extremely rare and occurs only a few times a century."
September 8	2020	Oregon, Washington	1,000,000	26 (Note: There were sixteen fatalities in California from the North Complex Fire, as well as nine fatalities in Oregon and one fatality in Washington state from various other fires.)		North Complex Fire and September 2020 Oregon and Washington wildfires
October 25	2020	California	413	0		Olinda, Dersch, and Point fires
October 26	2020	California	26,430	0		Silverado and Blue Ridge fires
December 3	2020	California	6,430	0		Bond and Willow fires
June 10	2021	Colorado, Utah	31	0		Foxton Fire
December 15	2021	Colorado, Kansas, Oklahoma, Texas	163,000	2		2021 Kansas wildfire outbreak – includes the Four County, North 207, Parker Creek, and Cobb fires
March 17	2022	Texas	45,000	0		Eastland Complex Fire
March 29	2022	Kansas, Oklahoma, Texas	33,000	0		Crittenberg Complex Fire
April 6	2022	Colorado, Kansas, Oklahoma, Texas	57,737	0		Gosper/Furnas County, Beaver River, and Sand Creek fires
April 7	2022	Kansas, Oklahoma, Texas	57,737	1		Gosper/Furnas County, Beaver River, and Sand Creek fires
April 12	2022	Kansas, Oklahoma, Texas	6,195	2		McBride Fire
April 22	2022	Colorado, New Mexico	160,000	0		April–May 2022 New Mexico wildfires
April 29	2022	Colorado, Kansas, New Mexico, Oklahoma	160,000	0		April–May 2022 New Mexico wildfires
May 8	2022	Colorado, New Mexico, Oklahoma, Texas	160,000	0		April–May 2022 New Mexico wildfires
May 9	2022	New Mexico, Oklahoma, Texas	160,000	0		April–May 2022 New Mexico wildfires
September 7	2022	Montana	1,000	0		Government, Billiard, and Bull Gin Complex fires
April 4	2023	Kansas, Oklahoma, Texas, New Mexico	1,550	0		Route 66 Fire
March 13	2024	Oklahoma, Texas	1,058,482	0		Smokehouse Creek Fire
April 6	2024	Colorado, Kansas, Oklahoma	5,000	0		57 Fire
May 25	2024	New Mexico	2,964	0		Blue 2 Fire
November 6	2024	California	20,000	0		Mountain Fire
December 10	2024	California	4,037	0		Franklin Fire
January 8	2025	California	57,636	30		January 2025 Southern California wildfires – First extremely critical risk day in January since 2008, and the first extremely critical risk day in January for California since 2007.
January 13	2025	California	57,636	0		January 2025 Southern California wildfires
January 14	2025	California	57,636	0		January 2025 Southern California wildfires
January 20	2025	California	57,636	0		January 2025 Southern California wildfires
January 21	2025	California	57,636	0		January 2025 Southern California wildfires
March 3	2025	New Mexico, Texas	—N/a	0		
March 4	2025	New Mexico, Texas	—N/a	0		
March 12	2025	Texas	2,345	0		Bear Fire
March 14	2025	Kansas, Missouri, New Mexico, Oklahoma, Texas	170,000	4		2025 Oklahoma wildfires, Tornado outbreak of March 13–16, 2025 § Non-tornadic effects
March 18	2025	New Mexico, Texas	7,000	0		High Lonesome Fire
April 17	2025	New Mexico	150	0		Rio Grande Fire
April 27	2025	New Mexico, Texas	367	0		Otero and Alamo fires
December 19	2025	Colorado, Wyoming	40,000	0		2025 Colorado wildfires
February 17	2026	Colorado, Kansas, Nebraska, Oklahoma, Texas	15,000	0		February 2026 Kansas wildfires
April 26	2026	New Mexico, Texas	2,673	0		Hummingbird Fire
May 17	2026	Colorado, Kansas, New Mexico, Oklahoma, Texas	115,000	0		Meade Lake Complex and Wolf Canyon fires
May 18	2026	Colorado, Kansas, New Mexico, Oklahoma, Texas	115,000	0		Meade Lake Complex and Wolf Canyon fires
June 26	2026	Arizona, Nevada, Utah	214,000	0		June 2026 Southwestern US wildfires
June 27	2026	Arizona, Colorado, New Mexico, Utah	214,000	3		June 2026 Southwestern US wildfires
June 28	2026	Arizona, Colorado, New Mexico, Utah	214,000	0		June 2026 Southwestern US wildfires
August 1	2026	Oregon, Washington	3,500	0		Old Trails Fire

== See also ==
- List of Storm Prediction Center high risk days
