= Texas–Oklahoma wildfires of 2005–06 =

Series of fires in the United States

Texas-Oklahoma wildfires of 2005-06
- Date: November 27, 2005 - April 2006
- Location: Oklahoma, Texas

Impacts
- Structures lost: 723 Total

Ignition
- Cause: Drought

The Texas-Oklahoma wildfires of 2005–06 were a series of wildfires, primarily in the states of Texas and Oklahoma, that began November 27, 2005 and continued into April 2006. Surrounding states were also affected to a lesser extent.

The fires were triggered by a combination of record-high temperatures, drought, and high winds in the region. The situation was exacerbated, at least in Texas, by plentiful rains in recent years. The rains encouraged vegetation growth, which then dried out over the winter drought leaving more potential fuel. The unusually dry conditions have been attributed to La Niña. At Will Rogers World Airport in Oklahoma City, only 0.36 inches (9.1 mm) of rain fell in the first two months of the year. On January 1, fires continued to develop throughout the two states. By January 3, many of the fires were reported to be under control; but outbreaks continued through January, February, and March.

In Texas, 12 people were killed. Eight Texas towns were evacuated in March 2006. From December 26, 2005, to April 3, 2006, Texas suffered 11,048 wildfires which burned 4,903,851 acres (19,845 km^{2}) and destroyed 423 homes. In Oklahoma, 869 homes were damaged; 300 of them were destroyed. As of April 5, 2006, there had been over 22,564 wildfires across the country in the year to date, burning 1,872,701 acres (7,579 km^{2}).

Texas governor Rick Perry declared the entire state a disaster area, describing it as a "tinderbox", and called for firefighters and fire equipment to combat the blazes. In addition, the governor of Oklahoma, Brad Henry, declared a disaster and pleaded for federal aid. On January 10, President Bush declared several Oklahoma counties to be disaster areas; the list was amended to include 26 counties by late March.

Heavy rains in late March promised at least temporary relief to the affected areas. Governor Henry lifted the burn ban (which had been instated in November) throughout Oklahoma on March 22, but reinstated it for most counties only five days later, on March 27. Much of Texas was also placed under a burn ban.

== Selected major fires ==
=== Callisburg, Texas ===
A fire in a rural area in Callisburg and Walnut Bend, near the Oklahoma border in Cooke County, was still burning on December 29. There were at least 10 to 30 buildings destroyed, plus more outbuildings. At least 5,000 acres (20 km^{2}) of land were scorched. One person was killed in the area due to the fires.

=== Cross Plains, Texas ===
On December 27, 2005, 116 homes were destroyed by a large fire in and around Cross Plains. On December 29, 2005, the Texas Department of Public Safety (DPS) listed 85 single-family homes, 25 mobile homes and six apartment units as being destroyed. An additional 36 homes were damaged. The 120-year-old First United Methodist Church of Cross Plains was also destroyed. Two people died after being trapped in their houses.

The fire started five miles (8.0 km) west of the city along Highway 36 and westerly winds of up to 30 mph (48 km/h) spread the flames into town burning a total of 7,665 acres (31 km^{2}) of land. The fire spared the near-century-old house (now a museum) of Robert E. Howard, author of the Conan the Barbarian books.

=== Mustang, Oklahoma ===
Several houses were burned in the area of Mustang, just outside Oklahoma City in Canadian County. The cause was unknown, but several houses were burned by the flames. At least 400 acres (1.6 km^{2}) of land were scorched.

=== Guthrie, Oklahoma ===
On the evening of January 1, a major fire developed in a suburban area near Guthrie (near Oklahoma City). Many buildings—presumably single-family homes—were burned, according to television coverage. Two neighborhoods were evacuated.

=== Oklahoma City, Oklahoma ===
Fires broke out intermittently within city limits. One grass fire early in January received national attention as it consumed several buildings. On April 6 and April 7, high winds with gusts of 40-50 mph created high potential for dangerous fires. At least 18 fires developed in Oklahoma City on these days. Outbreaks also occurred in the Texas Panhandle and elsewhere in Oklahoma, burning six homes in Kingfisher and forcing the evacuation of Cement, Reydon, and Cheyenne. Part of Oklahoma City was evacuated on April 7 when a fire from the previous day was revived by high winds.
