= Valley View High School (Valley View, Texas) =

Location
- 700 Frontage Road; Valley View, Texas 76272; United States; 33.480694°N 97.163254°W

Information
- School type: Public high school
- School district: Valley View Independent School District
- Principal: Jesse Newton
- Grades: 9-12
- Enrollment: 280 (2023-2024)
- Colors: Green and white
- Athletics conference: UIL Class AA
- Mascot: Eagle
- Yearbook: Aerie
- Website: Valley View High School

Valley View High School is a public high school located in the city of Valley View, Texas in Cooke County, United States and classified as a 2A school by the UIL. It is a part of the Valley View Independent School District located in north central Cooke County. In 2015, the school was rated "Met Standard" by the Texas Education Agency.

== Athletics ==
The Valley View Eagles compete in the following sports:

- Baseball
- Basketball
- Cross country
- Football
- Golf
- Track and field
- Powerlifting
- Softball
- Volleyball

=== State titles ===
- Boys cross country
  - 2014(2A), 2015(2A)
- Football
  - 1980(1A)

== Academics ==
- UIL Academic Meet champions
  - 1999(1A), 2000(1A)
