= Lois, Texas =

- Unincorporated community
- Location within Texas Location within the United States
- Coordinates: 33°27′22″N 97°13′13″W
- Country: United States
- State: Texas
- County: Cooke
- Elevation: 810 ft (250 m)
- Time zone: UTC-6 (Central (CST))
  - Summer (DST): UTC-5 (CDT)
- Area code: 940
- GNIS feature ID: 1361621

Lois is an unincorporated community in Cooke County, Texas, United States. According to the Handbook of Texas, the community had a population of 20 in 2000. It is located within the Dallas-Fort Worth Metroplex.

== Geography ==
Lois is located at the intersection of Farm to Market Roads 2848, 336, and 247, 12 mi (19 km) south of Gainesville and 6 mi (9.7 km) southwest of Valley View in southern Cooke County.

== Education ==
Lois had its own school in 1936. It joined the Valley View Independent School District in 1943.
