= Mountain Springs, Texas =

- Unincorporated community
- Location within Texas Location within the United States
- Coordinates: 33°28′49″N 97°2′38″W
- Country: United States
- State: Texas
- County: Cooke
- Elevation: 712 ft (217 m)
- Time zone: UTC-6 (Central (CST))
  - Summer (DST): UTC-5 (CDT)
- Area code: 940
- GNIS feature ID: 1363383

Mountain Springs is an unincorporated community in Cooke County, Texas, United States. According to the Handbook of Texas, the community had a population of 100 in 2000. It is located north of the Dallas-Fort Worth Metroplex.

== History ==
Married to Mary Strickland, Joe R. Burch arrived in Texas in the early 1850s and erected a house in what would become Mountain Springs in 1856. Founded in 1875, the post office was housed in Burch's home. There is a spring beside his house on a slope, which is why the name Mountain Springs (or Mountain Spring) was chosen. A store was opened by Ed Runyon approximately 2½ miles south of Burch's cabin in 1877, and the post office was relocated there as well. With 150 residents in 1892, the hamlet was said to have peaked in its development in the 1890s. Mountain Springs boasted a general shop, grocer, pharmacist, blacksmith, and wagonmaker in 1890, along with a gristmill and gin. The post office closed its doors in 1904. Between 1933 and 1947, a population of 25 was reported. Before 1948, the New Hope Baptist Church was relocated to Burns City, and the Mount Zion Methodist Church was demolished, but a store and another Baptist church were erected, and by the middle of the 20th century, they were the only communal institutions still standing. A church, a clubhouse, and a single company were recorded on the county map in 1963. The population was 100 in 1988; it was not listed from 1949 to 1987. The settlement consisted of multiple homes, a communal building, and one business in 1989. There were still 100 people living there in 2000.

== Geography ==
Mountain Springs is located at the intersection of Farm to Market Roads 922 and 372, 12 mi (19 km) southeast of Gainesville in southeastern Cooke County.

== Education ==
Three miles north of the village, in 1847, the county's first school was founded. A member of one of the county's pioneer families, Jane Shannon, conducted it at Mrs. Underwood's house. The county commissioners replaced the previous community schools with common school districts in 1884. Two couples surnamed Hodge and Rayzor were given land grants for the new school at Mountain Springs that year. After the Valley View Independent School District absorbed its territory in 1947, the school was shut down. In 1989, the school became the community center.
