= Walnut Bend, Texas =

- Unincorporated community
- Location within Texas Location within the United States
- Coordinates: 33°46′43″N 97°3′53″W
- Country: United States
- State: Texas
- County: Cooke
- Elevation: 764 ft (233 m)
- Time zone: UTC-6 (Central (CST))
  - Summer (DST): UTC-5 (CDT)
- Area code: 940
- GNIS feature ID: 2034690

Walnut Bend is an unincorporated community in Cooke County, Texas, United States. According to the Handbook of Texas, the community had a population of 59 in 2000. It is located within the Dallas-Fort Worth Metroplex.

== Education ==
Walnut Bend is served by the Walnut Bend Independent School District. High school students in the area attend Callisburg High School in the Callisburg Independent School District.
