= Muenster High School =

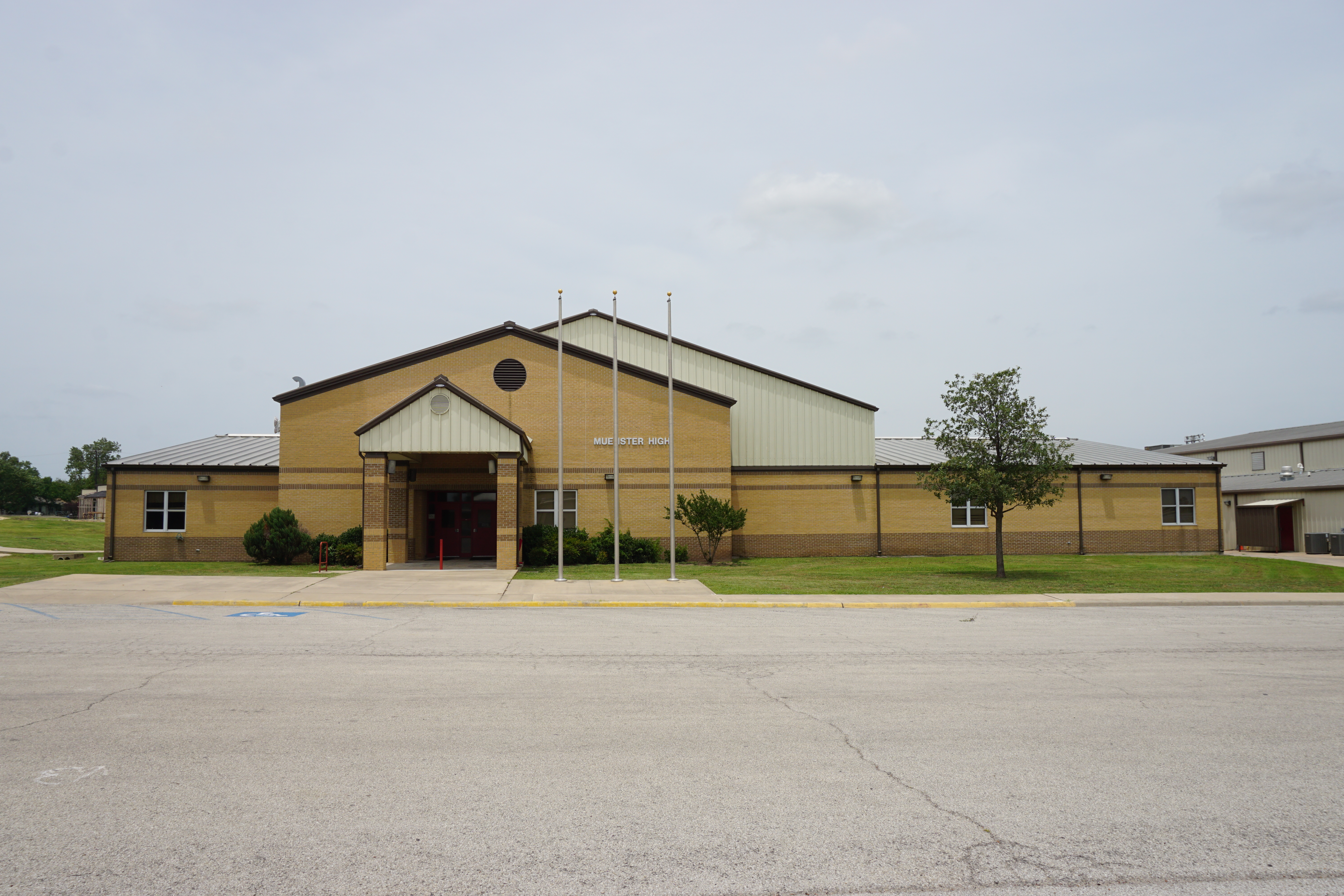
- Muenster High School

Location
- 135 East 7th Street; Muenster, Texas 76525-0339; United States; 33.656777°N 97.373787°W

Information
- School type: Public high school
- School district: Muenster Independent School District
- Principal: Dr. John Underwood
- Teaching staff: 24.43 (FTE)
- Grades: 7-12
- Enrollment: 256 (2023-2024)
- Student to teacher ratio: 10.48
- Colors: Red, white, and black
- Athletics conference: UIL Class 2A
- Mascot: Hornet
- Website: Muenster School website

Muenster High School is a 2A public high school located in Muenster, Texas (USA). It is part of the Muenster Independent School District located in western Cooke County. In 2011, the school was rated "Exemplary" by the Texas Education Agency.

A recent bond election in 2011 provided funds necessary to upgrade high school facilities including a new library, band hall, practice gym and agriculture shop. The upgrades will replace aging facilities.

== Athletics ==
The Muenster Hornets compete in the following sports:

- Baseball
- Basketball
- Cross Country
- Football
- Golf
- Powerlifting
- Softball
- Tennis
- Track and Field
- Baseball

=== State titles ===
- Baseball -
  - 2017 (2A)
- Boys Basketball -
  - 2017 (2A)
- Football -
  - 2017 (2A/D2), 2024 (2A/D2), 2025 (2A/D2)
