= Sturgeon, Texas =

- Unincorporated community
- Location within Texas Location within the United States
- Coordinates: 33°45′26″N 96°58′32″W
- Country: United States
- State: Texas
- County: Cooke
- Elevation: 817 ft (249 m)
- Time zone: UTC-6 (Central (CST))
  - Summer (DST): UTC-5 (CDT)
- Area code: 940
- GNIS feature ID: 1380621

Sturgeon is an unincorporated community in Cooke County, Texas, United States. According to the Handbook of Texas, the community had a population of 10 in 2000. It is located within the Dallas-Fort Worth Metroplex.

== History ==
There is not much history regarding this community. However, it was reported to have 50 inhabitants served by two businesses in the 1940s. It then became a community center for residents. Only ten people lived there in 2000.

== Geography ==
Sturgeon is located at the intersection of Farm to Market Roads 678 and 2383, 12 mi (19 km) northeast of Gainesville in northeastern Cooke County.

== Education ==
Today, Sturgeon is served by the Callisburg Independent School District.
