= Marysville, Texas =

- Unincorporated community
- Location within the state of Texas Marysville (the United States)
- Coordinates: 33°46′14″N 97°20′03″W
- Country: United States
- State: Texas
- County: Cooke

Population (2000)
  - Total: 15
- Time zone: UTC-6 (Central (CST))
  - Summer (DST): UTC-5 (CDT)

Marysville is an unincorporated community in northwestern Cooke County, Texas, United States. It lies approximately three miles from the Texas-Oklahoma border. According to the Handbook of Texas, the community had a population of 15 in 2000. It is located within the Dallas-Fort Worth metroplex.

== History ==
A post office was established at Marysville in 1873 and remained in operation until the mid-1940s. It was named Marysville either after Mary (Fitch) Corn, an early settler who came to the area in 1867 with her husband Richard, or for her brother, R. A. Fitch, who came to this part of Cooke County in 1869, and lived in Marysville, California. With every residential lot sold, Richard Corn donated a building lot to promote the opening of enterprises. Marysville featured two mercantile stores, cotton gins, blacksmith shops, grocery stores, churches, and a drugstore by 1900, along with 250 residents. There was also a livery stable. From 1925 until 1942, the town's population remained stable at 160 people. The town's population remained constant at 160 until 1942 when the construction of Camp Howze in northwest Cooke County forced around three-fourths of the region to the north, east, and south of Marysville out of the town's jurisdiction. Marysville suffered from the loss of so many tiny family farms. It had 70 residents, a church, and no recorded enterprises by the late 1980s. Daniel Montague, for whom neighboring Montague County is named, was the most well-known inhabitant of Marysville. He is interred in the Marysville Cemetery. 15 people were living there as of 2000.

Marysville was one of the locations in the 1978 movie The Swarm.

On May 7, 1995, an F3 tornado struck Marysville.

On July 28, 1921, Marysville had a branch of the Cooke County Library in its vicinity.

== Geography ==
Marysville is located at the intersection of Farm to Market Road 2739 and Farm to Market Road 1200 on South Fish Creek, 15 mi (24 km) northwest of Gainesville in Cooke County.

== Education ==
Marysville had its own school in 1900. Today, Marysville is served by the Muenster Independent School District.
