= Sivells Bend, Texas =

- Unincorporated community
- Location within the state of Texas Sivells Bend (the United States)
- Coordinates: 33°50′59″N 97°13′26″W
- Country: United States
- State: Texas
- County: Cooke
- Time zone: UTC-6 (Central (CST))
  - Summer (DST): UTC-5 (CDT)

Sivells Bend is an unincorporated community located four miles south of the Oklahoma border in Cooke County, Texas, United States. According to the Handbook of Texas, the community had a population of 50 in 2000. It is located within the Dallas-Fort Worth Metroplex.

== History ==
Around 1850, Simon and Bill Sivells, for whom the town was named after, relocated from Kentucky Town, Texas, to the location and established a small store nearby. The Sivellses gave up on their store due to ongoing Indian attacks, and it took another nine years for a stable community to be created. Sivells Bend was primarily occupied by farmers in its early years. A section of the Chisholm Trail passed through the town in the late 1860s. The town had a post office by 1872. A decade later, it had three general stores, three steam gristmill-cotton gins, two physicians, a blacksmith, and a population of 100. Sivells Bend was home to a Confederate company under Captain Clark's command during the Civil War. Cooke County's oil was discovered in the 1930s, but by the early 1940s, when construction on the massive army training base Camp Howze was underway, the population had dropped to 40. 1973 saw the closure of the Sivells Bend post office. The population was 100 in the late 1960s and early 1990s. The community included multiple residences, a Methodist church, and the Bearhead Baptist Church in the 1980s. In 2000, the population fell to 50.

On March 30, 1921, Sivells Bend had a branch of the Cooke County Library in its vicinity.

== Geography ==
Sivells Bend is located on Farm to Market Road 1201, 20 mi (32 km) northwest of Gainesville, 88 mi (142 km) northwest of Dallas, and 85 mi (137 km) northwest of Fort Worth in north-central Cooke County. It is also four miles south of the Red River.

== Education ==
One teacher taught at Sivells Bend School in 1882. The school continued to operate in the 1980s. Today, the community is served by the Sivells Bend Independent School District.

== Notable person ==
- Lillian Gunter, scholar, librarian, and historian.
