= Walnut Bend Independent School District =

School district in Texas

- 47 CR 198 Gainesville, Texas, 76240

District information
- Grades: Pre-K through 8
- Superintendent: Ken Kemp
- School board: 7 members
- Schools: 1 school: Walnut Bend Elementary
- NCES District ID: 4844490

Students and staff
- Students: 64
- Staff: 14
- District mascot: Pirates

Other information
- Website: www.walnutbendisd.net

Walnut Bend Independent School District is a public school district located in northeastern Cooke County, Texas (USA).

The district has one school that serves students from Pre-Kindergarten (Pre-K) through eighth grade. High school students take a bus to Callisburg Independent School District.

In 2009, the school district was rated "Recognized" by the Texas Education Agency.

In 2022, the school district received an "A" rating from the Texas Education Agency.
