= Road Runner, Texas =

Town in Texas

- Town
- Location within Texas Location within the United States
- Coordinates: 33°28′59″N 97°05′06″W
- Country: United States
- State: Texas
- County: Cooke
- Established: 2017

Area
  - Total: 0.65 sq mi (1.7 km^{2})
  - Land: 0.60 sq mi (1.6 km^{2})
  - Water: 0.05 sq mi (0.13 km^{2})
- Elevation: 653 ft (199 m)

Population (2020)
  - Total: 766
  - Density: 1,300/sq mi (490/km^{2})
- Time zone: UTC-6 (Central (CST))
  - Summer (DST): UTC-5 (CDT)
- ZIP Code: 76272 (Valley View)
- Area code: 940
- FIPS code: 48-62486
- GNIS feature ID: 2807613

Road Runner is a town in Cooke County, Texas, United States. Incorporated in 2017, the town had a population of 766 at the 2020 census.

== Geography ==
Road Runner is located along Farm to Market Road 922, approximately 5 miles (8 km) east of Valley View, 11 miles (18 km) south of Gainesville and 9 miles (14 km) northwest of Pilot Point in southeastern Cooke County. The Elm Fork of the Trinity River and Persimmon Creek meet and flow into Lake Ray Roberts immediately west of the town.

== History ==
Originally known as Pioneer Valley, it was developed as a private community managed by the Pioneer Valley Association (PVA). Residents paid annual dues and were eligible to vote for a board of directors. Maintenance of infrastructure was largely the responsibility of the PVA and growing dissatisfaction over deteriorating conditions sparked talks of incorporation as far back as 2007 and 2008, but it wasn't until 2017 that the proposal was put to a vote.

A total of 128 votes were cast in the November 7, 2017 election. 74 residents (57.8%) voted in favor of incorporating the Town of Road Runner as a Type C General-Law municipality with 54 (42.2%) opposed. Residents were also given the option of choosing town officials in the event that incorporation measure passed. There were two candidates for Mayor and three candidates competed for the two Commissioner positions. In the mayoral race, David Koenig Ortega Jr. defeated James Dale Chaffin, 75 votes to 50. In the Commissioners race, voters had the option of endorsing none, one, or two of the three candidates. Theodore John Howard received 75 votes, followed by Leon Franklin Noel Jr. with 69 and 39 for David Eugene Norris. Howard and Noel Jr. were elected as Commissioners.

== Education ==
The Pilot Point Independent School District serves Road Runner.
