= Valley View Independent School District =

Valley View Independent School District may refer to:

- Valley View Independent School District (Cooke County, Texas)
- Valley View Independent School District (Hidalgo County, Texas)
