= Callisburg High School =

Location
- 148 Dozier Street; Callisburg, Texas 76240; United States; 33.703368°N 97.012915°W

Information
- Type: Public high school
- Superintendent: Dr. Chris Bradshaw
- Principal: John Middleton
- Teaching staff: 31.84 (FTE)
- Grades: 9-12
- Enrollment: 335 (2023–2024)
- Student to teacher ratio: 10.52
- Colors: Maroon and white
- Athletics conference: Class 3A
- Team name: Wildcats
- Website: Official Website

Callisburg High School is a high school located in Callisburg, Texas, USA, and is classified as a 3A school by the UIL. It is part of the Callisburg Independent School District located in Cooke County. In 2015, the school was rated "Met Standard" by the Texas Education Agency.

== Athletics ==
The Callisburg Wildcats compete in these sports -

- Baseball
- Basketball
- Cross Country
- Football
- Golf
- Powerlifting
- Softball
- Tennis
- Track and Field
- Volleyball

=== State Champions ===
- Boys Golf
  - 2023(3A)
