= Sivells Bend Independent School District =

School district in Texas

Sivells Bend Independent School District is a public school district located in north central Cooke County, Texas (USA).

The district has one school that serves students in Pre-Kindergarten (Pre-K) through eighth grade. High school students are bussed to the Muenster Independent School District.

In 2009, the school district was rated "recognized" by the Texas Education Agency.
