= Lake Kiowa, Texas =

- Census-designated place
- Coordinates: 33°33′59″N 97°0′27″W
- Country: United States
- State: Texas
- County: Cooke

Area
  - Total: 3.8 sq mi (9.8 km^{2})
  - Land: 3.0 sq mi (7.7 km^{2})
  - Water: 0.81 sq mi (2.1 km^{2})
- Elevation: 709 ft (216 m)

Population (2020)
  - Total: 2,254
  - Density: 760/sq mi (290/km^{2})
- Time zone: UTC-6 (Central (CST))
  - Summer (DST): UTC-5 (CDT)
- ZIP code: 76240
- Area code: 940
- FIPS code: 48-40624
- GNIS feature ID: 1852719
- Website: www.lakekiowatx.com

Lake Kiowa is an affluent census-designated place (CDP) in Cooke County, Texas, United States, the majority of which consists of the private residential gated community of the same name.

The population of Lake Kiowa was 1,906 in 2010. By 2020, the population had grown to 2,254, an 18.3% increase from the 2010 census. In 2023, the population was 2,496.

== Geography ==
Lake Kiowa is a private residential gated community located in southeastern Cooke County at 33°33′59″N 97°0′27″W (33.566497, -97.007479), around the lake of the same name. The lake is an impoundment on Indian Creek, part of the Trinity River watershed. The community is 10 miles (16 km) southeast of Gainesville, the seat of Cooke County.

According to the United States Census Bureau, the CDP has a total area of 3.8 square miles (9.8 km^{2}), of which 3.0 square miles (7.7 km^{2}) is land and 0.81 square miles (2.1 km^{2}), or 21.07%, is water.

== Demographics ==
Historical population
Census	Pop.	Note	%±
2000	1,883		—
2010	1,906		1.2%
2020	2,254		18.3%
U.S. Decennial Census; 1850–1900 1910; 1920 1930 1940; 1950 1960 1970; 1980 1990 2000; 2010 2020

Lake Kiowa first appeared as a census designated place in the 2000 U.S. census.

2023 data

As of 2023 there were 2,496 people and 1,121 households residing in the CDP with an average household size of 2.2 persons. The population density was approximately 836 inhabitants per square mile.

The racial and ethnic makeup of the CDP was about 90.2% White alone (Non-Hispanic), 3.73% Two or More Races (Non-Hispanic), 3.0% White (Hispanic), 1.92% Two Races Including Other (Non-Hispanic), and 0.76% Two Races Including Other (Hispanic); Hispanic residents of any race comprised 4.13% of the population. The median age of residents was 58.8 years old, of which 47.2% were male and 52.8% female.

The CDP's median household income was $123,098.

=== 2020 census ===
Lake Kiowa CDP, Texas – Racial and ethnic composition Note: the US Census treats Hispanic/Latino as an ethnic category. This table excludes Latinos from the racial categories and assigns them to a separate category. Hispanics/Latinos may be of any race.
Race / Ethnicity (NH = Non-Hispanic)	Pop 2000	Pop 2010	Pop 2020	% 2000	% 2010	% 2020
White alone (NH)	1,812	1,821	2,055	96.23%	95.54%	91.17%
Black or African American alone (NH)	2	4	15	0.11%	0.21%	0.67%
Native American or Alaska Native alone (NH)	9	20	23	0.48%	1.05%	1.02%
Asian alone (NH)	6	8	10	0.32%	0.42%	0.44%
Native Hawaiian or Pacific Islander alone (NH)	0	2	2	0.00%	0.10%	0.09%
Other race alone (NH)	2	0	0	0.11%	0.00%	0.00%
Mixed race or Multiracial (NH)	19	5	88	1.01%	0.26%	3.90%
Hispanic or Latino (any race)	33	46	61	1.75%	2.41%	2.71%
Total	1,883	1,906	2,254	100.00%	100.00%	100.00%

As of the 2020 United States census, there were 2,254 people, 1,070 households, and 839 families residing in the CDP.

=== 2000 census ===
As of the census of 2000, there were 1,883 people, 861 households, and 661 families residing in the CDP. The population density was 628.1 inhabitants per square mile (242.5/km^{2}). There were 1,064 housing units at an average density of 354.9 per square mile (137.0/km^{2}). The racial makeup of the CDP was 97.45% White, 0.11% African American, 0.53% Native American, 0.37% Asian, 0.48% from other races, and 1.06% from two or more races. Hispanic or Latino of any race were 1.75% of the population.

There were 861 households, out of which 14.4% had children under the age of 18 living with them, 72.7% were married couples living together, 2.7% had a female householder with no husband present, and 23.2% were non-families. 21.0% of all households were made up of individuals, and 14.2% had someone living alone who was 65 years of age or older. The average household size was 2.19 and the average family size was 2.49.

In the CDP, the population was spread out, with 13.6% under the age of 18, 2.6% from 18 to 24, 14.0% from 25 to 44, 35.4% from 45 to 64, and 34.4% who were 65 years of age or older. The median age was 59 years. For every 100 females, there were 93.1 males. For every 100 females age 18 and over, there were 92.3 males.

The median income for a household in the CDP was $55,430, and the median income for a family was $66,250. Males had a median income of $44,531 versus $27,750 for females. The per capita income for the CDP was $28,354. About 1.7% of families and 5.4% of the population were below the poverty line, including 10.4% of those under age 18 and 1.5% of those age 65 or over.

== Community government and amenities ==
Lake Kiowa is governed by the Lake Kiowa Property Owners Association, which is owned by the property owners themselves as the community is almost totally built out (all lots previously owned by the developers were sold as of 2017; the only vacant lots remaining are owned by private individuals).

The Association is led by a nine-member elected board of directors, with each director serving a three-year term. The terms are offset with three directors up for election each year. The Association maintains the community's amenities as well as its roads (the community's main road, Kiowa Drive, loops around the lake and crosses over its dam).

The Association provides private security, limited to writing speeding/parking tickets and enforcing community rules. Police protection is provided by the Cooke County Sheriff's Department and, to a lesser extent, the nearby Gainesville Police Department. Fire and emergency services are provided by the Indian Creek Volunteer Fire Department which serves Lake Kiowa and the surrounding area.

The Lake Kiowa Special Utility District maintains the water supply. Trash pickup is provided by the Association through a private contractor (recycling is no longer offered as of 2018, outside of aluminum can donation sites for the local Kiwanis Club). Sewer service is not available; homes must install and maintain an operative septic system.

The Callisburg Independent School District serves students residing in Lake Kiowa.

== Amenities ==
The Association owns the amenities offered by the community, which are centered around its namesake lake (a private 563-acre (2.28 km^{2}) lake). The lake is large enough for skiing, tubing, and other controlled boating activities, though wake boats must disable their ballast system to prevent damage to private boat docks and sea walls. Fishing is permitted and abundant fish reside in the lake; the Lake Kiowa Anglers and Conservation Club maintains the small and large fishing areas provided.

In addition, the Association also operates a private 18-hole golf course. Two different beach areas offer swimming, volleyball, tennis, and other opportunities. Each beach has picnic areas and a large pavilion is located at the Lodge (the community clubhouse and restaurant/bar). A nine-hole disc golf course is also available.
