= Hood, Texas =

- Unincorporated community
- Location within Texas Location within the United States
- Coordinates: 33°32′34″N 97°20′57″W
- Country: United States
- State: Texas
- County: Cooke
- Elevation: 988 ft (301 m)
- Time zone: UTC-6 (Central (CST))
  - Summer (DST): UTC-5 (CDT)
- Area code: 940
- GNIS feature ID: 1379953

Hood is an unincorporated community in Cooke County, Texas, United States. According to the Handbook of Texas, the community had a population of 20 in 2000. It is located within the Dallas-Fort Worth Metroplex.

== Geography ==
Hood is located 14 mi (23 km) southwest of Gainesville in Cooke County.

== Education ==
Today, Hood is served by the Era Independent School District.
