= Freemound, Texas =

Ghost town in Texas, US

Freemound
- Ghost town
- Location in Texas
- Coordinates: 33.4315022°N 97.0858437°W
- Country: United States
- State: Texas
- County: Cooke
- Elevation: 692 ft (211 m)
- USGS Feature ID: 1379920

Freemound is a ghost town in Cooke County, Texas, United States. A post office operated there from 1894 to 1907. In the 1940s, 10 people lived there.
