= Camp Howze, Texas =

US Army World War II era military base

Coordinates: 33.6813°N 97.1596°W

Camp Howze, Texas, was an infantry replacement training center located adjacent to the town of Gainesville in Cooke County, Texas. It was named for Major General Robert Lee Howze, a Medal of Honor recipient.

== History ==
As the army and the rest of the United States, prepared to enter World War II, the active posts of the United States Army were inadequate for training the numbers of draftees necessary to fill the army's wartime ranks. Several infantry replacement training centers were constructed, particularly in Texas, to accommodate the large number of new soldiers. Camp Howze was one such camp, and development began in December 1941. By 1942, trainees began arriving by train and bus from all over the country and the population of both Camp Howze and Gainesville quickly increased.

The first commander was Major General John H. Hilldring. With a capacity of 39,963 soldiers, the camp was one of the largest training centers in the country. It was responsible for the preparation of several hundred thousand soldiers for both the European and Pacific campaigns. Divisions that were trained at Camp Howze included the 84th, 86th, and 103rd Divisions of the U.S. Army. The camp also housed as many as 3000 Prisoners of War including Italian artist Alberto Burri. This is incorrect information written in the article by Oisteanu. Burri went to a POW Camp in Hereford, Texas located near Amarillo, Texas. Camp Howze is in Gainesville, Texas. See book by: Ceasre Brandi "Burri" Trans. Martha Leeb Hadzi Roma. Editalia, 1963; Flash Art International Summer 1989 "Burri" Article by Shawn Caley page 97; Burri Exhibition Catalogue designed by Herbert Matte (2,500 copies printed in October 1963) Foreword by James Johnson Sweeney; Exhibition dated October 16 - December 1, 1963 Line 4 Date: 1944 Mentions POW Camp located in Hereford, Texas near Amarillo, Texas.

As World War II waned, the post was declared excess and closed in 1946. Farmers who had voluntarily and involuntarily given up land for the establishment of the camp were allowed to repurchase the property if desired. Some did, but many did not and towns such as Marysville and Sivells Bend never recovered from the war years. Gainesville, on the other hand, benefited greatly from Camp Howze and the $20 million spent by the federal government. Additionally it benefited as citizens of the smaller towns in the area moved to Gainesville to be nearer construction and other jobs, many fueled by Camp Howze.

Today, the Gainesville municipal airport and various industries occupy the former land of the camp. Much of the training area returned to farm land, particularly in the Red River valley. In the 21st century, the army, and more specifically the U.S. Army Corps of Engineers, has returned to the former camps, including Camp Howze, to remove unexploded ordnance left over from years of training.

== See also ==
- List of World War II prisoner-of-war camps in the United States
- Camp Howze also was a United States Army base in South Korea.
