= Coesfield, Texas =

Ghost town in Texas, US

- Location in Texas
- Coordinates: 33.8184368°N 97.0319539°W
- Country: United States
- State: Texas
- County: Cooke
- Named after: Coesfeld
- Elevation: 738 ft (225 m)
- USGS Feature ID: 1379567

Coesfield is a ghost town in Cooke County, Texas, United States.

== History ==
Coesfield is situated on the Red River. It was named by resident American Civil War veteran Frank Liedke, who named it after his hometown Coesfeld. A post office was established in 1883, and remained in operation until 1906. By the mid-1980s, the population was down to a few residents.
