= Hemming, Texas =

Ghost town in Texas, US

Hemming
- Ghost town
- Location in Texas
- Coordinates: 33.4315022°N 97.0858437°W
- Country: United States
- State: Texas
- County: Cooke
- Named for: C. C. Hemming
- Elevation: 692 ft (211 m)
- USGS Feature ID: 1379920

Hemming is a ghost town in Cooke County, Texas, United States.

== History ==
Hemming was established in 1889, and was named after banker C. C. Hemming, who donated land for a school in 1890. A post office operated from 1894 until combining with the Pilot Point post office in 1905, with W. J. Pipkin serving as the first postmaster. During its peak in the early 1900s, the town had a school, three churches and four businesses, and had a population of 125.

On April 27, 1927, a tornado hit Hemming, killing seven people and destroying all but one building, which were rebuilt by the 1920s. It was abandoned by the 1980s.
