= Burns City, Texas =

- Unincorporated community
- Location within Texas Location within the United States
- Coordinates: 33°30′45″N 97°2′15″W
- Country: United States
- State: Texas
- County: Cooke
- Elevation: 682 ft (208 m)
- Time zone: UTC-6 (Central (CST))
  - Summer (DST): UTC-5 (CDT)
- Area code: 940
- GNIS feature ID: 1379483

Burns City is an unincorporated community in Cooke County, Texas, United States. According to the Handbook of Texas, the community had a population of 61 in 2000. It is located within the Dallas-Fort Worth Metroplex.

== Geography ==
Burns City is located on Farm to Market Road 372, 15 mi (24 km) southeast of Gainesville in southeastern Cooke County.

== Education ==
Today, Burns City is served by the Valley View Independent School District.
