= Custer City, Texas =

Ghost town in Texas, US

Custer City
- Ghost town
- Location in Texas
- Coordinates: 33.6828847°N 97.0500094°W
- Country: United States
- State: Texas
- County: Cooke
- Elevation: 883 ft (269 m)
- USGS Feature ID: 1379623

Custer City, formerly Centennial City, is a ghost town in Cooke County, Texas, United States.

== History ==
Custer City is situated in Farm to Market Road 2896. It was established in 1876 by Jim Jones, who built a cotton gin and flour mill. It was originally called Centennial City because it was founded on the United States Centennial. It was later renamed to Custer City after George Armstrong Custer. A post office opened in 1877, and operated until 1902. In 1892, it had 25 residents.
