= Bloomfield, Texas =

Ghost town in Texas, US

Bloomfield
- Location in Texas
- Coordinates: 33.4445576°N 97.0155632°W
- Country: United States
- State: Texas
- County: Cooke
- Settled: 1876
- Named after: Nearby field a wildflowers
- Elevation: 636 ft (194 m)
- GSNS Feature ID: 1379431

Bloomfield is a ghost town in Cooke County, Texas, United States.

== History ==
Bloomfield is situated on Farm to Market Road 372. It was first settled in 1876 by Tennessee native Alfred Robison and his children. The post office operated from 1877 to 1907. The first postmaster's was Crockett Robison, and his sister Angeline Jackson named the town after a nearby field of wildflowers. Another settler included John S. Riley, an uncle of James Whitcomb Riley. By 1884, the town had a population of 300. Lake Ray Roberts' area included Bloomfield.
