= Lillian Gunter =

American librarian and historian

- Born: September 15, 1870; Sivells Bend, Texas
- Died: October 10, 1926 (aged 56)
- Other names: Librarian, historian

Lillian Gunter (September 15, 1870 – October 10, 1926) was a scholar, librarian, and historian during the late 19th to early 20th century in Texas.

== Early life and education ==
Gunter was born and raised in Sivells Bend, Texas. She was the first of two daughters born to parents Addison Yancey Gunter and Elizabeth Ligon. Gunter was sent away at age 12 to St. Louis, Missouri, before attending Virginia Wesleyan Institute.

After receiving an education, Gunter moved to Gainesville, Texas, where her father had his plantation and, whereon his death she assumed possession of the establishment from 1892 to 1902. While managing the plantation, she decided the state needed a system of county libraries. Gunter traveled to New York to study at the New York Library School where she completed a course on the California State Library System.

== Career ==
Upon moving back to Gainesville, Gunter was essential to the creation of a small subscription library with the XLI Club. By 1908, the library was receiving funds from the municipal government, though Gunter led the designing of the building.

Once Andrew Carnegie gave his grant to the city, Gunter and her fellow club members raised the funds to buy a site for construction of the Gainesville Public Library.

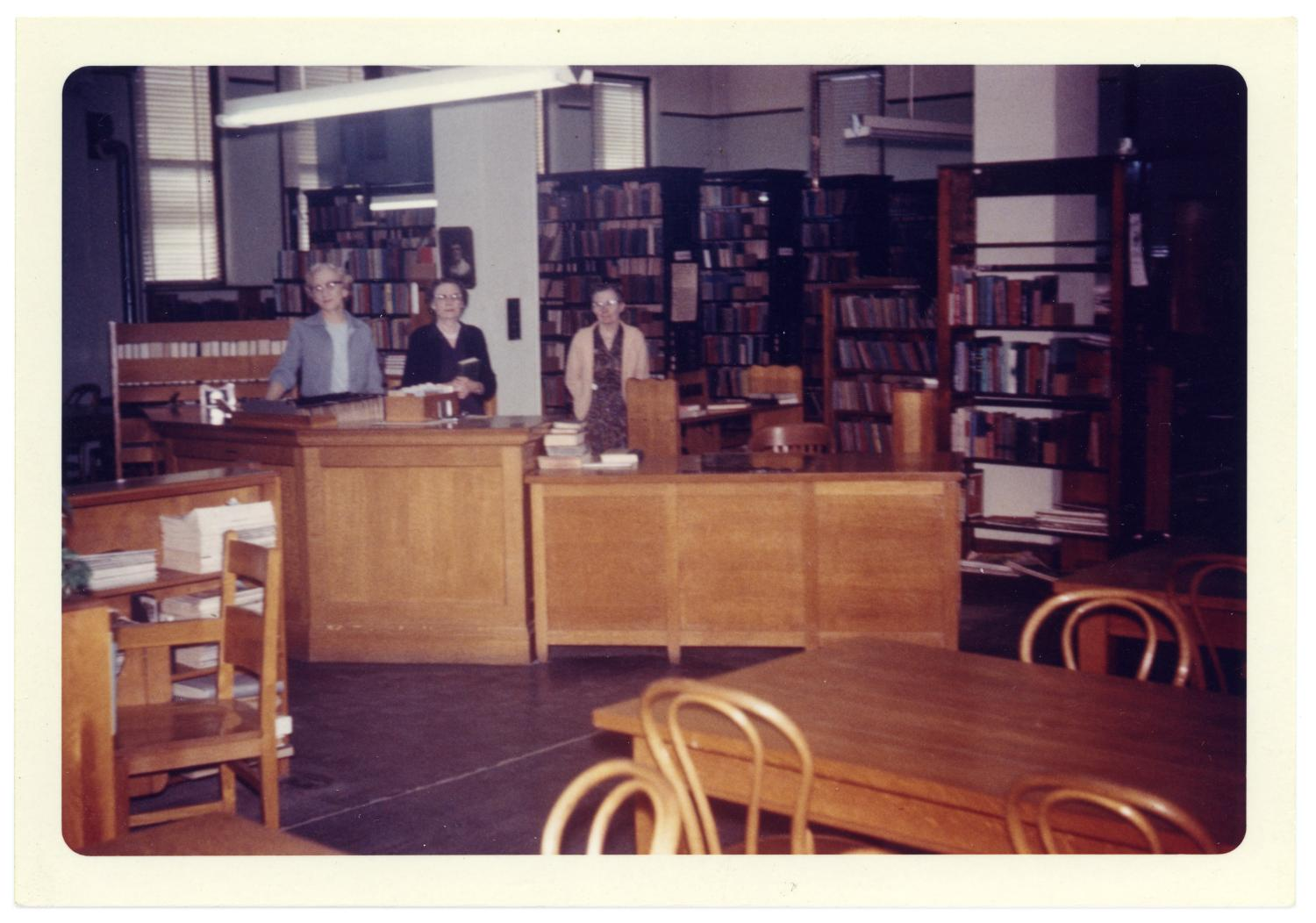
Pictured are three library staff inside the Gainesville Carnegie Public Library.

Though she began work in 1908, Gunter became the first head librarian of the Gainesville Carnegie Public Library upon its completion in 1914. She sat as treasurer of the Texas Library Association from 1914 to 1915. On October 14, 1915, she was elected chairman of the legislative committee. Amongst her many lobbying activities, she also fought for library access for African-Americans, which failed to prosper. Gunter also participated in the Suffragette movement to earn women the right to vote.

Gunter eventually founded and directed the Cooke County Library in 1920 and directed. Five years later, Gunter became a charter member of the Red River Valley Historical Association. While handling librarian duties, Gunter began to construct a law that would bring library services to rural Texas. Along with county representative George W. Dayton, Gunter worked on the Texas County Library Law which passed on March 5, 1917, and was signed by Governor of Texas James E. Ferguson. Though the first county library law would later be repealed, Gunter pushed for a second library law after getting advice from the California State Library. The new law – the 1919 Texas County Library Law – passed and signed by Governor of Texas William P. Hobby.

Gunter died on October 10, 1926.
