= Callisburg Independent School District =

School district in Texas

Callisburg Independent School District is a school district in Callisburg, Texas (USA).

The district serves the majority of eastern Cooke County, including the city of Callisburg and the gated community of Lake Kiowa.

In 2009, the school district was rated Recognized by the Texas Education Agency.

== Campuses ==
Callisburg ISD consists of two campuses, Callisburg High School Middle School campus located in Callisburg and Callisburg Elementary campus located in Woodbine, Texas. The elementary consists of two buildings, the Woodbine building and the Rad Ware building.
