= Anderson Creek Fire =

2016 Oklahoma wildfire

- Location: Woods County, Oklahoma; Comanche County and Barber Country, Kansas

Statistics
- Burned area: 400,000 acres (160,000 ha)

Ignition
- Cause: Sparked by a vehicle and spread by dry vegetation

Map
- Map

Anderson Creek Fire was a wildfire that originated from Woods County, Oklahoma, on Tuesday, March 22, 2016, and lasted for nearly a week. The fire burned a total area of 620 square miles (400,000 acres), consisting of prairie and cattle grazing land, mainly in Kansas, the state closest to the fire's point of origin. It was the largest wildfire in the Kansas state history. The fire did not harm any humans. It killed livestock, damaged homes, structures, and fences.

== Origin ==
The fire was sparked by a vehicle in Woods County, Oklahoma, at 5:45 p.m. Dry conditions and gusty winds, blowing at a speed of 45 mph, and cedars fueled the fire. The blaze spread to Comanche County and then to the Barber County, Kansas.

== Description ==
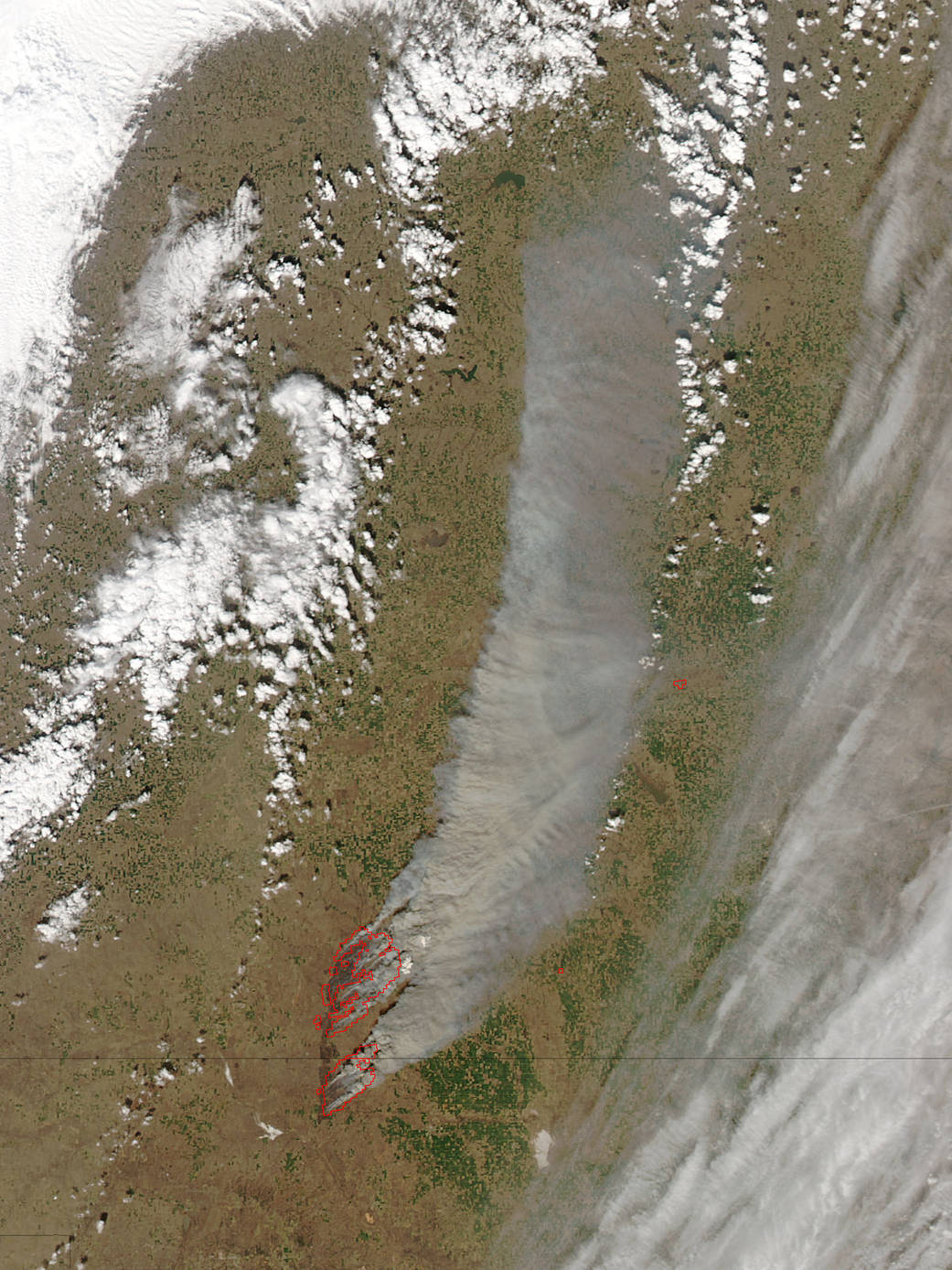
This natural-color satellite image was collected by the Moderate Resolution Imaging Spectroradiometer (MODIS) aboard the Aqua satellite on March 23, 2016. Actively burning areas, detected by MODIS’s thermal bands, are outlined in red.

The first team of firefighters was deployed to the site at 6:16 p.m. The fire was so large that radar sweeps picked it up due to gusty winds. The winds caused the fire to grow rapidly and spread to Kansas. More than one hundred state and local agencies responded. The firefighting force consisted of 950 firefighters from three counties and two states, and four National Guard helicopters. Kansas All Hazards Incident Management team set up a command center in Medicine Lodge. It was spreading a mile every four minutes. The fire was 15% contained by March 25, and 800 homes were under threat. The county jail, hospital, and Medicine Lodge residents evacuated. One-inch snow fell on Easter Sunday, which boosted the firefighting efforts.

By March 28, the fire was 90% controlled in Comanche County, 40% in Woods County, and 31% in Barber County. The voluntary evacuation was stopped in Sun City and Lake City. By March 29, the fire was 95% contained, and by March 31, it was fully under control. The total fire suppression costs went up to $1.5 million, out of which $400,000 was for four National Guard helicopters. The remaining costs consisted of fuel, food, ice, and water. 272,000 acres of Barber County and 141,000 of Comanche County was burned. Two-thirds of the entire area burned was in Kansas.

== Consequences ==
The fire killed 600 cattle, burned 16 houses, including two houses north of Medicine Lodge, and destroyed 25 structures. An unknown number of cattle were lost. The fire caused the melting of some cows‘ eyeballs, singed udders, and melted plastic ear tags. It killed coyotes, deer, porcupines, possums, skunks, and raccoons. It burned a mobile home that was worth $6000, and a cell tower hut. Two bridges in the Barber County were fully destroyed. It destroyed miles of hedge-post fences and burned barns.

== Benefits ==
Before the fire, the foresters were removing the rapidly growing cedar trees. The fire burned 6% of the total population, which would have taken decades to be removed.
