= Muenster Independent School District =

School district in Texas

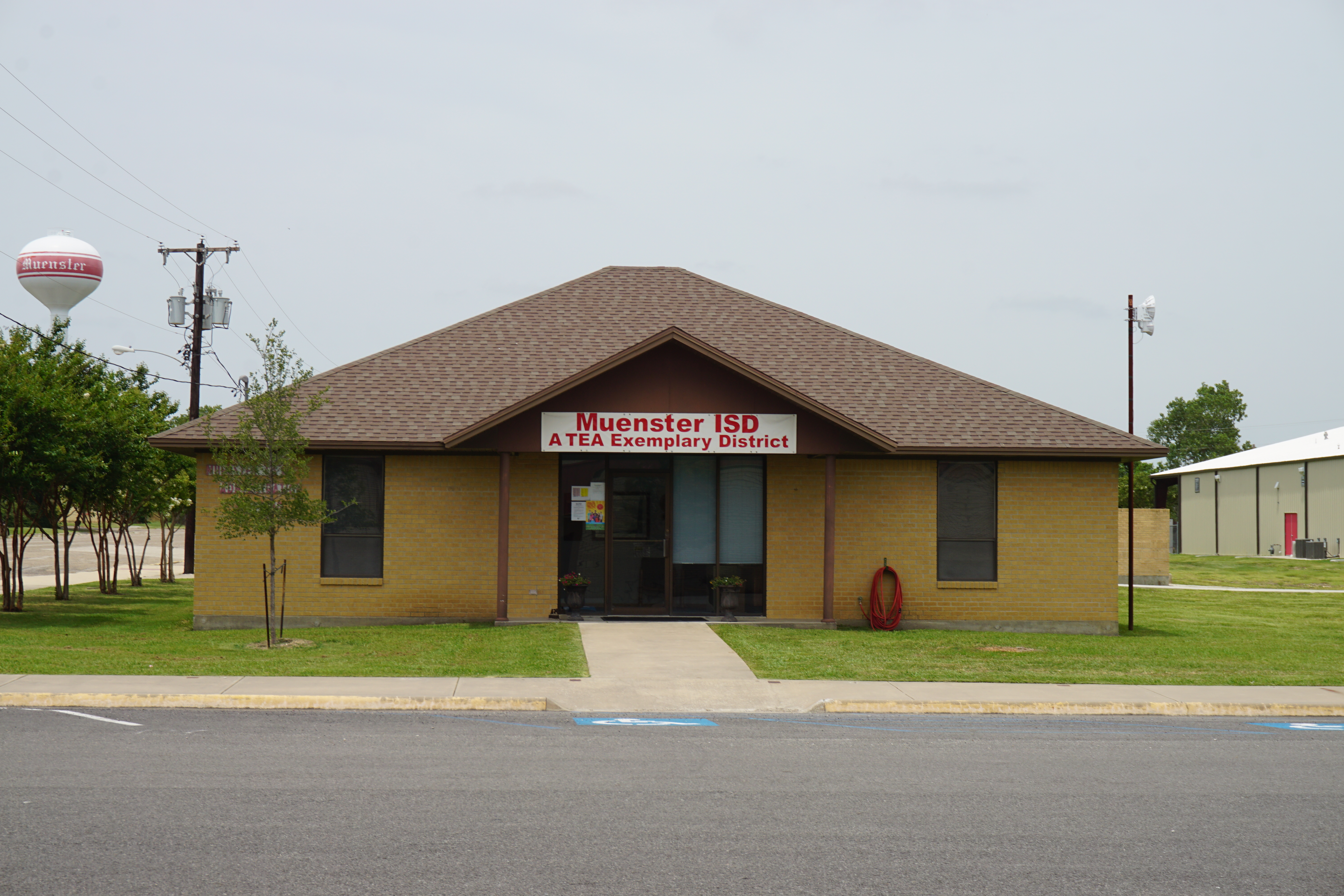

Location
- Muenster, TX ESC Region 11 USA

District information
- Type: Public
- Motto: "A Tradition of Success"
- Grades: Pre-K through 12
- Superintendent: Matthew Quick (2024)
- Budget: $8,577,169 (2024-2025)

Students and staff
- Students: 547 (PK-12) 2024-2025
- Teachers: 46 (2023-2024)
- Athletic conference: UIL Conference 2A
- District mascot: Hornets
- Colors: Red, Black, and White

Other information
- Website: www.muensterisd.net

Muenster Independent School District is a public school district based in Muenster, Texas (USA).

In 2009, the school district was rated "recognized" by the Texas Education Agency.

== Schools ==
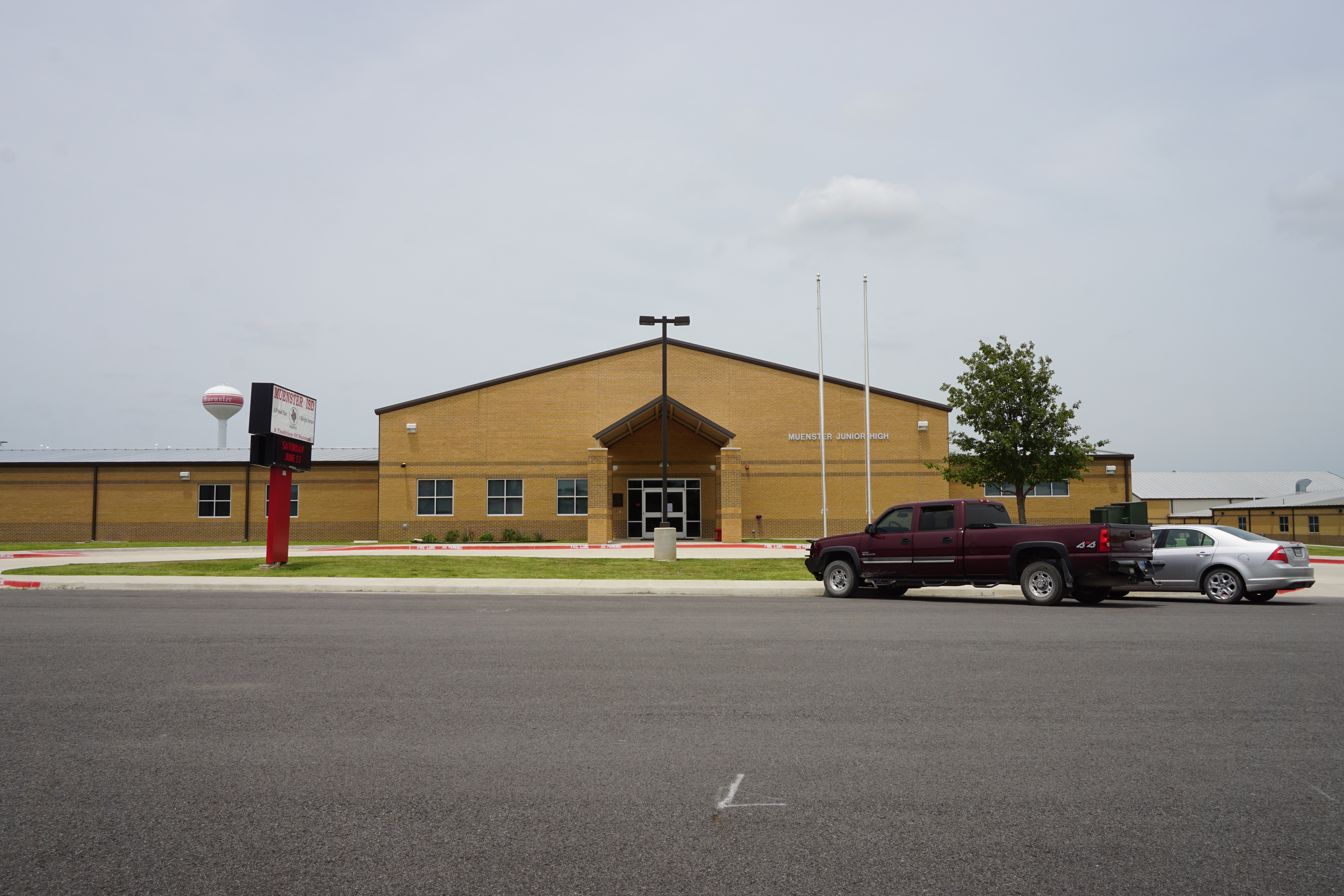
Muenster Junior High School

- Muenster High School (Grades 9-12) - also serves students from the Sivells Bend Independent School District
- Muenster Junior High School (Grades 7-8)
- Muenster Elementary School (Grades PK-6)

== Athletics ==
The Muenster Hornets fielded their first football team in 1948 and have fielded one every single season since then. The Hornets' first big rival were the St. Jo Panthers. These two teams battled annually for the coveted "Horseshoe" until the trophy was retired in the late 1950s.

The 1968 and 1969 seasons were historic for the Hornets. In 1968 they finished undefeated in their district and won the bi-district title over Lake Dallas by a score of 38–6. They repeated as bi-district champs in 1969, this time edging Lake Dallas 29–28.

It was during this time Muenster began to develop a rivalry with the local Lindsay Knights. The annual matchup has taken the name of the "Kraut Bowl" due to the communities' strong German heritage. The 1976 football team remains as one Muenster's best squads. They swept district once again, and advanced to the Quarter Finals before falling to De Leon, 20–14.

For the larger part of the late 20th century Muenster remained a formidable opponent, but not an elite football team. They finally made the transformation in 2010, with the hiring of Coach Brady Carney. Muenster finished undefeated, beat Lindsay twice, and advanced to the Quarter Finals for the first time in 34 years. The 2011 team was even better. Once again the Hornets ran the table, crushed Lindsay twice, and advanced to the Quarter Finals, where they lost in the waning minutes to Mart, 35–29. The 2015 team advanced as far as the State semifinals, but were beaten by Bremond, the 2014 and 2015 Class 2A Division 2 State Champions.

In 2017 Muenster High School became the first school in Texas to win three UIL Class 2A state championships in one calendar year by earning the gold ball in basketball, baseball and football. The Hornet football team, led by Coach Brady Carney once again, won the 2024 2A State Championship with a 36-29 victory over the Shiner Comanches on December 18, 2024 at AT&T Stadium in Arlington, home of the Dallas Cowboys.
