= Myra, Texas =

- Unincorporated community Census designated place
- Location within the state of Texas Myra (the United States)
- Coordinates: 33°37′30″N 97°18′56″W
- Country: United States
- State: Texas
- County: Cooke

Area
  - Total: 0.51 sq mi (1.32 km^{2})
- Elevation: 935 ft (285 m)

Population (2020)
  - Total: 202
  - Density: 396/sq mi (153/km^{2})
- Time zone: UTC-6 (Central (CST))
  - Summer (DST): UTC-5 (CDT)
- ZIP codes: 76253
- GNIS feature ID: 1363560

Myra is an unincorporated community and census designated place (CDP) in western Cooke County, Texas, United States. As of the 2020 census, Myra had a population of 202. It lies just off U.S. Route 82, west of the city of Gainesville, the county seat of Cooke County. Its elevation is 935 feet (285 m). It had a post office, with the ZIP code 76253 until early 2013. It is now closed.

== Demographics ==
Historical population
Census	Pop.	Note	%±
2020	202		—
U.S. Decennial Census; 1850–1900 1910; 1920 1930 1940; 1950 1960 1970; 1980 1990 2000; 2010 2020

Myra first appeared as a census designated place in the 2020 U.S. census.

=== 2020 census ===
Myra CDP, Texas – Racial and ethnic composition Note: the US Census treats Hispanic/Latino as an ethnic category. This table excludes Latinos from the racial categories and assigns them to a separate category. Hispanics/Latinos may be of any race.
Race / Ethnicity (NH = Non-Hispanic)	Pop 2020	% 2020
White alone (NH)	173	85.64%
Black or African American alone (NH)	2	0.99%
Native American or Alaska Native alone (NH)	1	0.50%
Asian alone (NH)	0	0.00%
Native Hawaiian or Pacific Islander alone (NH)	0	0.00%
Other race alone (NH)	0	0.00%
Mixed race or Multiracial (NH)	14	6.93%
Hispanic or Latino (any race)	12	5.94%
Total	202	100.00%
