= Murphy Complex Fire =

2007 wildfire in Idaho and Nevada, USA

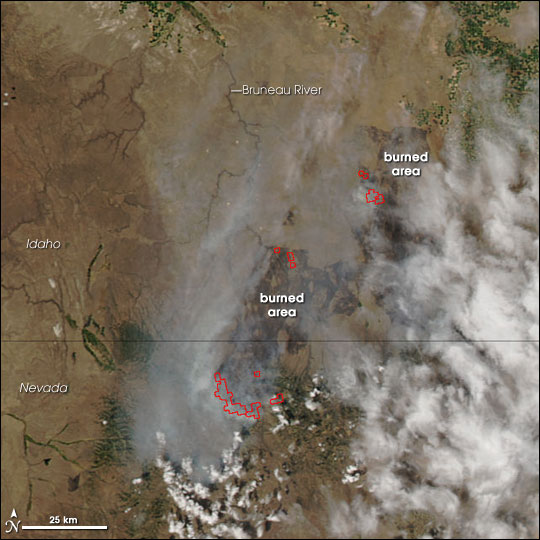
- Date: July 16, 2007 – August 2007
- Location: Idaho and Nevada, United States

Statistics
- Burned area: 652,016 acres (263,862 ha)

The Murphy Complex Fire was a 2007 wildfire that included acreage upon the Bureau of Land Management (BLM) Bruneau and Jarbidge Field Offices of Idaho, BLM Elko Field Office of Nevada, and Forest Service Mountain City and Jarbidge Districts of Nevada. It burned an estimated 652,016 acres (263,862 ha) of land. By acreage, it was the third largest wildfire in the United States between 1997 and 2009. The fire affected Owyhee and Twin Falls counties in Idaho, and Elko County, Nevada. Nearly three times as much acreage burned in the two Idaho counties as burned in Nevada. Aerial crews were primarily responsible for fighting the fire in Castleford, Idaho. About 560 wildfire firefighters were involved including a Type 1 team that specializes in fighting large wildfires. This was the third large fire in as many years on land managed by the Jarbidge Field Office in Idaho's Twin Falls District. Because of this, the BLM held a workshop on large wildfires in the district on May 12–14, 2009.

The fire was a combination of six wildfires caused by lightning in south-central Idaho and north-central Nevada that started on July 16–17, 2007. The four largest fires were called the Rowland, Elk Mountain, Smith Crossing and Buck Flat fires. They merged over the weekend of July 21, 2007, and the wildfire was renamed the Murphy Complex Fire. It spread quickly due to the hot and dry conditions and threatened or damaged a wide variety of natural resources, plants, animals, people and property. By the time it was contained on August 2, 2007 an estimated 483,000 acres (195,463 ha) in Idaho and 170,000 acres (68,797 ha) in Nevada had burned. It was the largest Idaho wildfire since 1910. Afterward, the BLM undertook a large scale reclamation effort, which included fencing, seedling planting, shrub planting, drill seeding, aerial seeding, cultural inventory, weed treatment and monitoring. Monitoring is planned for 425,815 acres (172,321 ha). Total reclamation costs are estimated at over $11 million during fiscal years 2007–2010, with full recovery of the natural systems taking several additional years.
