= Muenster, Texas =

- City
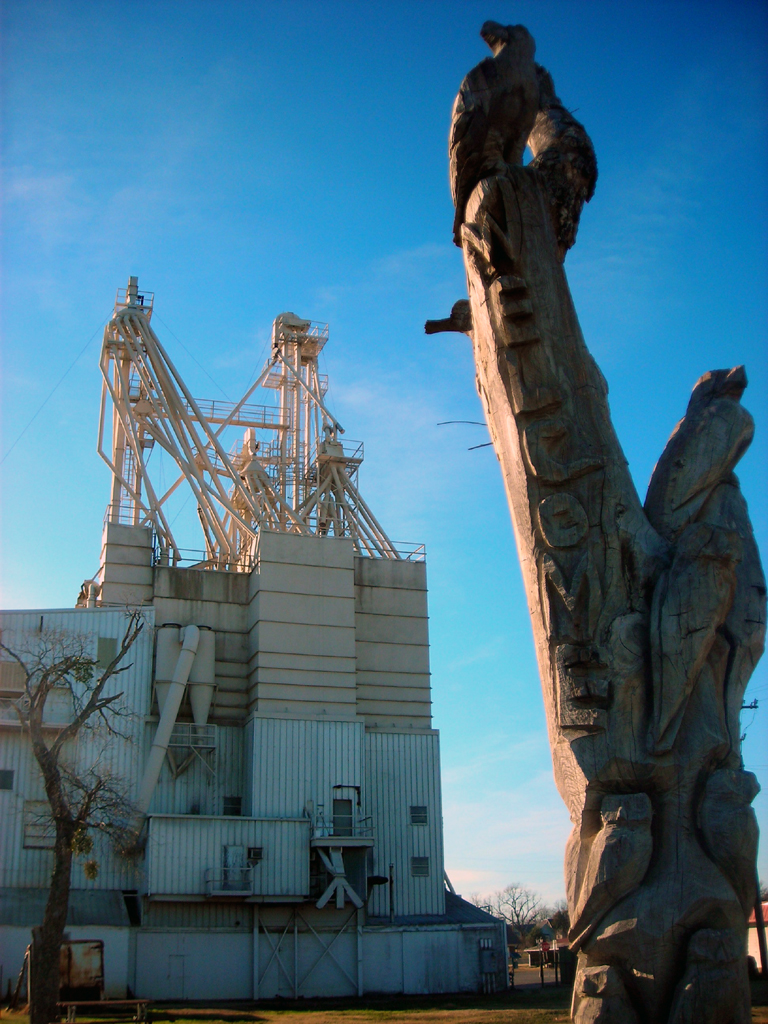
- A wood carving and feed mill in Muenster
- Nickname: Glockenspiel City
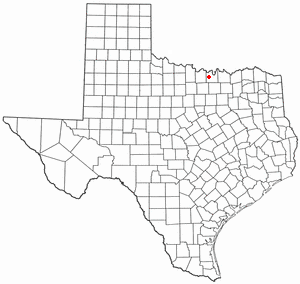
- Location of Muenster, Texas

- Location in Cooke County
- Coordinates: 33°39′10″N 97°22′22″W
- Country: United States
- State: Texas
- County: Cooke

Area
  - Total: 2.65 sq mi (6.87 km^{2})
  - Land: 2.64 sq mi (6.83 km^{2})
  - Water: 0.015 sq mi (0.04 km^{2})
- Elevation: 1,014 ft (309 m)

Population (2020)
  - Total: 1,536
  - Density: 582/sq mi (225/km^{2})
- Time zone: UTC-6 (Central (CST))
  - Summer (DST): UTC-5 (CDT)
- ZIP code: 76252
- Area code: 940
- FIPS code: 48-49932
- GNIS feature ID: 2411191
- Website: cityofmuenstertx.org

Muenster (/ˈmʌnstər/ MUN-stər) is a city in western Cooke County, Texas, United States, along U.S. Route 82. The population was 1,536 at the 2020 census. Muenster is a primarily German-Texan city.

== History ==
In 1887, Missouri–Kansas–Texas Railroad constructed a line from Gainesville to Henrietta that passed through the site that would become Muenster. The town was subsequently founded in 1889 by German Catholic settlers Carl and Emil Flusche, who invited other German Catholics to join them. The town was originally to be called "Westphalia", but since the name Westphalia, Texas, was already taken, Muenster was selected instead in honor of Münster, the capital of Westphalia, but these cities are not sister-cities.

Many residents still spoke German in day-to-day life up until the First World War, after which the language was no longer taught in the schools and steadily declined in use.

With more than 90% of the population German and Catholic, the city has preserved many German customs, and still produces traditional foods at the local meat market and Bäckerei. An annual festival in April, Germanfest, includes beer, BBQ, German food, music, and bike and footraces. A Christkindlmarkt is held each year on Thanksgiving weekend.

Catholicism was so important to the early settlers that they built a school before a church was ever established. That school, Sacred Heart Catholic School, still exists today (one of only three high schools in the Fort Worth Diocese), along with the public Muenster Independent School District.

== Geography ==
According to the United States Census Bureau, the city has a total area of 2.5 square miles (6.6 km^{2}), of which 2.3 acres (9,506 m^{2}) (0.14%) are covered by water.

=== Climate ===
The climate in this area is characterized by hot, humid summers and generally mild to cool winters. According to the Köppen climate classification, Muenster has a humid subtropical climate, Cfa on climate maps.

== Demographics ==
Historical population
Census	Pop.	Note	%±
1890	38		—
1930	459		—
1940	595		29.6%
1950	900		51.3%
1960	1,190		32.2%
1970	1,411		18.6%
1980	1,408		−0.2%
1990	1,387		−1.5%
2000	1,556		12.2%
2010	1,544		−0.8%
2020	1,536		−0.5%
U.S. Decennial Census

=== 2020 census ===
As of the 2020 census, Muenster had a population of 1,536 and a median age of 37.8 years; 26.0% of the residents were under 18 and 16.1% were 65 or older. There were 104.0 males for every 100 females, and 102.7 males for every 100 females 18 and over.

Of the 588 households in Muenster, 35.4% had children under 18 living in them, 53.9% were married-couple households, 18.5% were households with a male householder and no spouse or partner present, and 23.1% were households with a female householder and no spouse or partner present. About 27.2% of all households were made up of individuals, and 12.4% had someone living alone who was 65 or older.

The city had 640 housing units, of which 8.1% were vacant. The homeowner vacancy rate was 0.7% and the rental vacancy rate was 13.2%.

None of the residents lived in urban areas, while all lived in rural areas.

Racial composition as of the 2020 census
Race	Number	Percentage
White	1,362	88.7%
Black or African American	5	0.3%
American Indian and Alaska Native	23	1.5%
Asian	5	0.3%
Native Hawaiian and other Pacific Islander	0	0.0%
Some other race	44	2.9%
Two or more races	97	6.3%
Hispanic or Latino (of any race)	99	6.4%

=== 2000 census ===
As of the census of 2000, 1,556 people, 588 households, and 401 families resided in the city. The population density was 1,209.3 inhabitants per square mile (466.9/km^{2}). The 628 housing units averaged 488.1 per square mile (188.0/km^{2}). The racial makeup of the city was 97.62% White, 0.13% Native American, 0.51% Asian, 0.71% from other races, and 1.03% from two or more races. About 2.19% of the population was Hispanic or Latino of any race.

Of the 588 households, 35.5% had children under 18 living with them, 57.1% were married couples living together, 7.7% had a female householder with no husband present, and 31.8% were not families. Around 28.9% of all households were made up of individuals, and 17.7% had someone living alone who was 65 or older. The average household size was 2.57 and the average family size was 3.20.

In the city, the age distribution was 29.5% under 18, 6.0% from 18 to 24, 26.9% from 25 to 44, 18.3% from 45 to 64, and 19.3% who were 65 or older. The median age was 37 years. For every 100 females, there were 88.1 males. For every 100 females 18 and over, there were 83.8 males.

The median income in the city was $39,125 for a household and $48,000 for a family. Males had a median income of $29,688 versus $22,697 for females. The per capita income for the city was $20,638. About 4.3% of families and 5.4% of the population were below the poverty line, including 5.7% of those under 18 and 8.1% of those 65 or over.

== Notable people ==
- Augustine Danglmayr, auxiliary bishop of the Roman Catholic Diocese of Dallas, was born in Muenster.
- Dean L. Sicking, inventor and traffic safety researcher
- Drew Springer, District 30’s senator, lives in Muenster.
