= Valley View, Texas =

- City
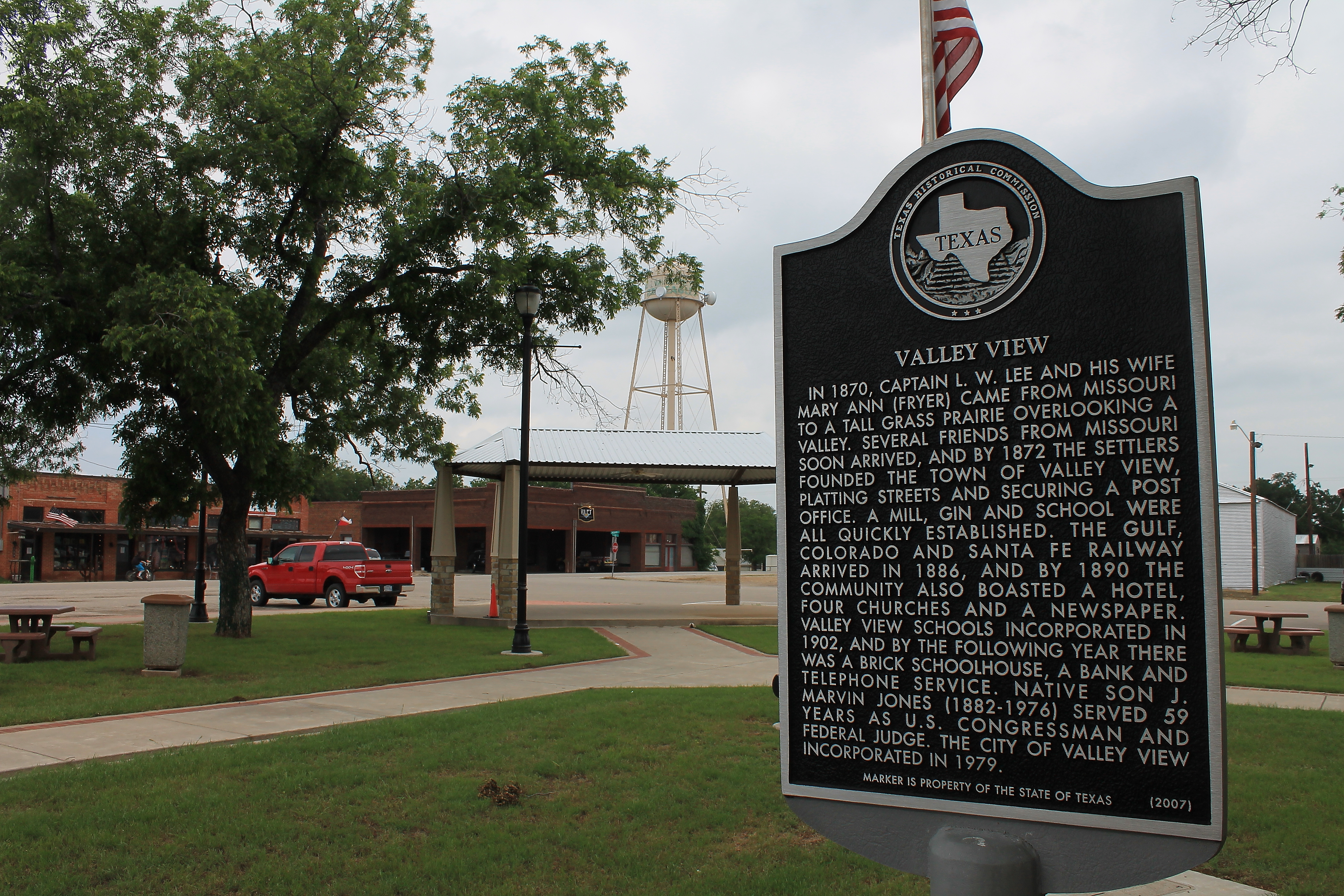

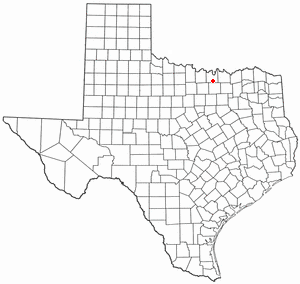
- Location of Valley View, Texas

- Location in Cooke County
- Coordinates: 33°29′40″N 97°09′37″W
- Country: United States
- State: Texas
- County: Cooke

Area
  - Total: 2.40 sq mi (6.21 km^{2})
  - Land: 2.39 sq mi (6.20 km^{2})
  - Water: 0.0039 sq mi (0.01 km^{2})
- Elevation: 705 ft (215 m)

Population (2020)
  - Total: 737
  - Density: 308.0/sq mi (118.91/km^{2})
- Time zone: UTC-6 (Central (CST))
  - Summer (DST): UTC-5 (CDT)
- ZIP code: 76272
- Area code: 940
- FIPS code: 48-74756
- GNIS feature ID: 2413420
- Website: cityofvv.com

Valley View is a city in Cooke County, Texas, and a tiny part in Denton County, Texas United States. Its population was 737 at the 2020 census.

== History ==
The town was first settled in 1870 by the Lee family. L.W. Lee plotted a town on his land in 1872, naming it "Valley View", presumably for the view offered at the site of Spring Creek valley. Eighteen families moved in, and a post office opened in the community that same year.

A blacksmith shop was opened in 1873, and the shop was used for the community's first school. By 1884, the town had an estimated 250 inhabitants, three steam gristmills and cotton gins, and three general stores, and it shipped cotton, livestock, and wheat. The Gulf, Colorado and Santa Fe Railway (now the BNSF Railway) reached the town in 1886. Valley View had four church buildings and a hotel by 1890, and the Valley View Independent School District was incorporated in 1902. In 1903, the town witnessed dramatic growth with the completion of a two-story brick school house and six brick business buildings, the arrival of telephone service, and the opening of a bank. The following year the Valley View News began publishing weekly. The community had an estimated population of 600 by 1914.

Two fires struck the town in 1924. In the fall of 1940, the east side of the town square was burned down. On the morning of December 19, bank robbers started a second fire as they robbed the First National Bank (later named the Valley View National Bank and was owned by Thomas R. Couch) of $5,000. A further two city blocks were destroyed.

Valley View's population was estimated at 700 from the 1920s through the mid-1960s. In 1970, it was 805, but the town declined during the next decade. When Valley View formally incorporated in 1980, it had 514 inhabitants and six businesses. The town began to grow again in the 1980s and had a population of 640 in 1990.

=== 2024 Tornado ===
On May 25, 2024, both Valley View and the city of Pilot Point were struck by an intense tornado, resulting in 7 deaths and 100 injuries as well as extensive damage throughout both cities. A truck stop was also severely damaged in Valley View. The National Weather Service rated the tornado EF3 on the Enhanced Fujita scale.

== Geography ==
Valley View is located in southern Cooke County. Interstate 35/U.S. Route 77 passes just east of the center of town, with access from exits 485 through 487. The highway leads north 10 miles (16 km) to Gainesville, the county seat, and south 20 miles (32 km) to Denton.

According to the United States Census Bureau, Valley View has a total area of 2.4 square miles (6.2 km^{2}), of which 0.004 square miles (0.01 km^{2}), or 0.17%, is covered by water.

=== Climate ===
The climate in this area is characterized by hot, humid summers and generally mild to cool winters. According to the Köppen climate classification, Valley View has a humid subtropical climate, Cfa on climate maps.

== Demographics ==
Historical population
Census	Pop.	Note	%±
1980	514		—
1990	640		24.5%
2000	737		15.2%
2010	757		2.7%
2020	737		−2.6%
U.S. Decennial Census

=== 2020 census ===
As of the 2020 census, there were 737 people, 272 households, and 206 families residing in the city. The median age was 35.3 years, 30.7% of residents were under the age of 18, and 12.6% of residents were 65 years of age or older. For every 100 females there were 97.1 males, and for every 100 females age 18 and over there were 94.3 males age 18 and over.

0.0% of residents lived in urban areas, while 100.0% lived in rural areas.

There were 272 households in Valley View, of which 41.2% had children under the age of 18 living in them. Of all households, 50.7% were married-couple households, 17.3% were households with a male householder and no spouse or partner present, and 28.3% were households with a female householder and no spouse or partner present. About 23.9% of all households were made up of individuals and 12.1% had someone living alone who was 65 years of age or older.

There were 295 housing units, of which 7.8% were vacant. The homeowner vacancy rate was 1.5% and the rental vacancy rate was 6.7%.

Racial composition as of the 2020 census
Race	Number	Percent
White	635	86.2%
Black or African American	4	0.5%
American Indian and Alaska Native	2	0.3%
Asian	2	0.3%
Native Hawaiian and Other Pacific Islander	0	0.0%
Some other race	17	2.3%
Two or more races	77	10.4%
Hispanic or Latino (of any race)	77	10.4%

=== 2000 census ===
As of the census of 2000, 737 people, 270 households, and 216 families were residing in the town. The population density was 319.0 inhabitants per square mile (123.2/km^{2}). The 292 housing units had an average density of 126.4 per square mile (48.8/km^{2}). The racial makeup of the town was 97.01% White, 0.27% African American, 0.14% Native American, 0.81% Asian, 1.22% from other races, and 0.54% from two or more races. Hispanics or Latinos of any race were 3.39% of the population.

Of the 270 households, 38.5% had children younger than 18 living with them, 62.6% were married couples living together, 14.8% had a female householder with no husband present, and 20.0% were not families. About 17.8% of all households were made up of individuals, and 7.8% had someone living alone who was 65 or older. The average household size was 2.73, and the average family size was 3.10.

In the town, the age distribution was 29.7% younger than 18, 8.0% from 18 to 24, 30.0% from 25 to 44, 21.8% from 45 to 64, and 10.4% who were 65 or older. The median age was 34 years. For every 100 females, there were 91.9 males. For every 100 females 18 and older, there were 84.3 males.

The median income for a household in the town was $48,500, and for a family was $51,875. Males had a median income of $39,167 versus $24,107 for females. The per capita income for the town was $18,204. About 7.9% of families and 10.0% of the population were below the poverty line, including 14.4% of those younger than age 18 and 4.3% of those age 65 or older.

=== Religion ===
Six churches are within the city limits of Valley View: First Baptist Church (Southern Baptist), Church of Christ (Churches of Christ), Cornerstone Baptist Church (Southern Baptist), St. John's Catholic Church (Roman Catholic), Methodist Church (United Methodist), and Christian Gathering (independent Pentecostal).

== Government ==
The town voted to incorporate in 1979. The city is a type A general law city, and is served by a volunteer mayor and five aldermen.

Sources of revenue are sales tax, ad valorem tax, and franchise fees. The city employs a municipal judge, city secretary, city/municipal court clerk, police officer, and city attorney.

The city's extraterritorial jurisdiction is half a mile outside the city limits.

== Education ==
Valley View is served by the Valley View Independent School District. The district was incorporated in 1902. A two-story brick school was built in 1902–1903. A larger school was built in 1938, which is still in use as part of the elementary campus. It has been renovated to restore the original features of the building.

The district grew during the time of school consolidation in the early to mid-1900s. Local schools such as John's Branch, Lone Oak, Elm Grove, Lois, Burns City, and Mountain Springs became part of the Valley View ISD.

The VVISD served about 650 students on three connected campuses, as of 2007.

The varsity football team was the state champion in 1980. The girls' varsity basketball team was 1-A state runner-up in 1999 and 2000. In 2005, the varsity football team won the 16-A district championship. The football team has also won the bi-district title for the 2015–2017 years. The boys' cross country team won the state championship in 2014 and 2015, and placed third at the state meet in 2017 and 2018. The boys' track team placed third at the state track meet in 2018.

== Notable people ==
- John Marvin Jones, a member of the U.S. House of Representatives from 1916 to 1940 was born in Valley View.

It's the setting of the Disney Channel show The Villains of Valley View.
