= Callisburg, Texas =

- City
- Interactive map of Callisburg, Texas
- Coordinates: 33°41′52″N 97°00′45″W
- Country: United States
- State: Texas
- County: Cooke

Area
  - Total: 2.05 sq mi (5.30 km^{2})
  - Land: 2.05 sq mi (5.30 km^{2})
  - Water: 0 sq mi (0.00 km^{2})
- Elevation: 814 ft (248 m)

Population (2020)
  - Total: 321
  - Density: 157/sq mi (60.6/km^{2})
- Time zone: UTC-6 (Central (CST))
  - Summer (DST): UTC-5 (CDT)
- FIPS code: 48-11968
- GNIS feature ID: 2409964
- Website: www.callisburgtx.com

Callisburg is a city in Cooke County, in the U.S. state of Texas. The population was 321 at the 2020 census, down from 353 at the 2010 census.

== History ==
The town was named for blacksmith Sam Callis, the first settler there.

== Geography ==
Callisburg is located in northeastern Cooke County northeast of Gainesville, the county seat, and 9 miles (14 km) northwest of Whitesboro.

According to the United States Census Bureau, Callisburg has a total area of 2.0 square miles (5.3 km^{2}), all land.

== Demographics ==
Historical population
Census	Pop.	Note	%±
1980	281		—
1990	344		22.4%
2000	365		6.1%
2010	353		−3.3%
2020	321		−9.1%
U.S. Decennial Census

=== 2020 census ===
As of the 2020 census, Callisburg had a population of 321, the median age was 39.5 years, 26.2% of residents were under the age of 18, and 13.4% of residents were 65 years of age or older. For every 100 females there were 91.1 males, and for every 100 females age 18 and over there were 82.3 males.

0% of residents lived in urban areas, while 100.0% lived in rural areas.

There were 127 households in Callisburg, of which 39.4% had children under the age of 18 living in them. Of all households, 49.6% were married-couple households, 18.1% were households with a male householder and no spouse or partner present, and 27.6% were households with a female householder and no spouse or partner present. About 19.7% of all households were made up of individuals and 5.5% had someone living alone who was 65 years of age or older.

There were 134 housing units, of which 5.2% were vacant. Among occupied housing units, 70.1% were owner-occupied and 29.9% were renter-occupied. The homeowner vacancy rate was <0.1% and the rental vacancy rate was <0.1%.

Racial composition as of the 2020 census
Race	Percent
White	85.7%
Black or African American	0.6%
American Indian and Alaska Native	0.3%
Asian	0.3%
Native Hawaiian and Other Pacific Islander	0%
Some other race	3.7%
Two or more races	9.3%
Hispanic or Latino (of any race)	7.8%

=== 2000 census ===
As of the census of 2000, there were 365 people, 129 households, and 105 families residing in the city. The population density was 155.6 inhabitants per square mile (60.1/km^{2}). There were 137 housing units at an average density of 58.4 per square mile (22.5/km^{2}). The racial makeup of the city was 95.07% White, 1.92% Native American, 1.92% from other races, and 1.10% from two or more races. Hispanic or Latino of any race were 3.56% of the population.

There were 129 households, out of which 44.2% had children under the age of 18 living with them, 71.3% were married couples living together, 6.2% had a female householder with no husband present, and 18.6% were non-families. 17.1% of all households were made up of individuals, and 7.8% had someone living alone who was 65 years of age or older. The average household size was 2.83 and the average family size was 3.17.

In the city, the population was spread out, with 32.3% under the age of 18, 7.7% from 18 to 24, 28.8% from 25 to 44, 19.2% from 45 to 64, and 12.1% who were 65 years of age or older. The median age was 33 years. For every 100 females, there were 109.8 males. For every 100 females age 18 and over, there were 112.9 males.

The median income for a household in the city was $34,500, and the median income for a family was $40,893. Males had a median income of $29,231 versus $20,417 for females. The per capita income for the city was $15,228. About 13.1% of families and 11.1% of the population were below the poverty line, including 11.2% of those under age 18 and none of those age 65 or over.
