= Valley View Independent School District (Cooke County, Texas) =

School district in Texas

Coordinates: 33°28′56.5″N 97°9′47″W

Location
- Valley View, Texas; United States

District information
- Type: Public
- Motto: Where Education is Taken Above and Beyond
- Superintendent: C. James Womack

Other information
- Website: www.vvisd.net

Valley View Independent School District is a public school district based in Valley View, Texas (USA).

In 2009, the school district was rated "academically acceptable" by the Texas Education Agency.

== History ==
A two-story brick school was built in 1902-03 when the district was first formed, located on the north side of the town square.

A larger school was built in 1938 on the south side of the town. The building is still in use as part of the elementary school. It has been renovated to restore the original features of the building. The original footprint of the school features a maintained decorative sandstone perimeter wall and bleachers, originally built by the Works Progress Administration in 1932-33. It was preserved during campus renovations circa 2015.

The district grew during the time of school consolidation in the early to mid 20th Century. Schools such as John's Branch, Lone Oak, Elm Grove, Lois, Burns City, Mountain Springs, and others became part of the Valley View Independent School District.

== The District Today ==
Today, the school district serves approximately 941 students on three connected campuses.

Valley View Elementary consists of grades Kindergarten through 4th and includes classrooms for the Cooke County Special Education cooperative's Preschool Program for Children with Disabilities. Class sizes typically are 19:1, with kindergarten classes at a 16:1 ratio.

Valley View Middle School (grades 5th-8th) provides limited art and music classes, drama, agricultural science, and family consumer science. Students may also participate in University Interscholastic League (UIL) academic and athletic contests.

Valley View High School is a small Class 3A school. Past achievements include State Championships in UIL academics, football, and cross country. Other student extra-curricular activities include the Student Council, FFA, FCCLA, BPA, FCA, and the National Honor Society.
