= Cooke County, Texas =

County in Texas, United States

- County
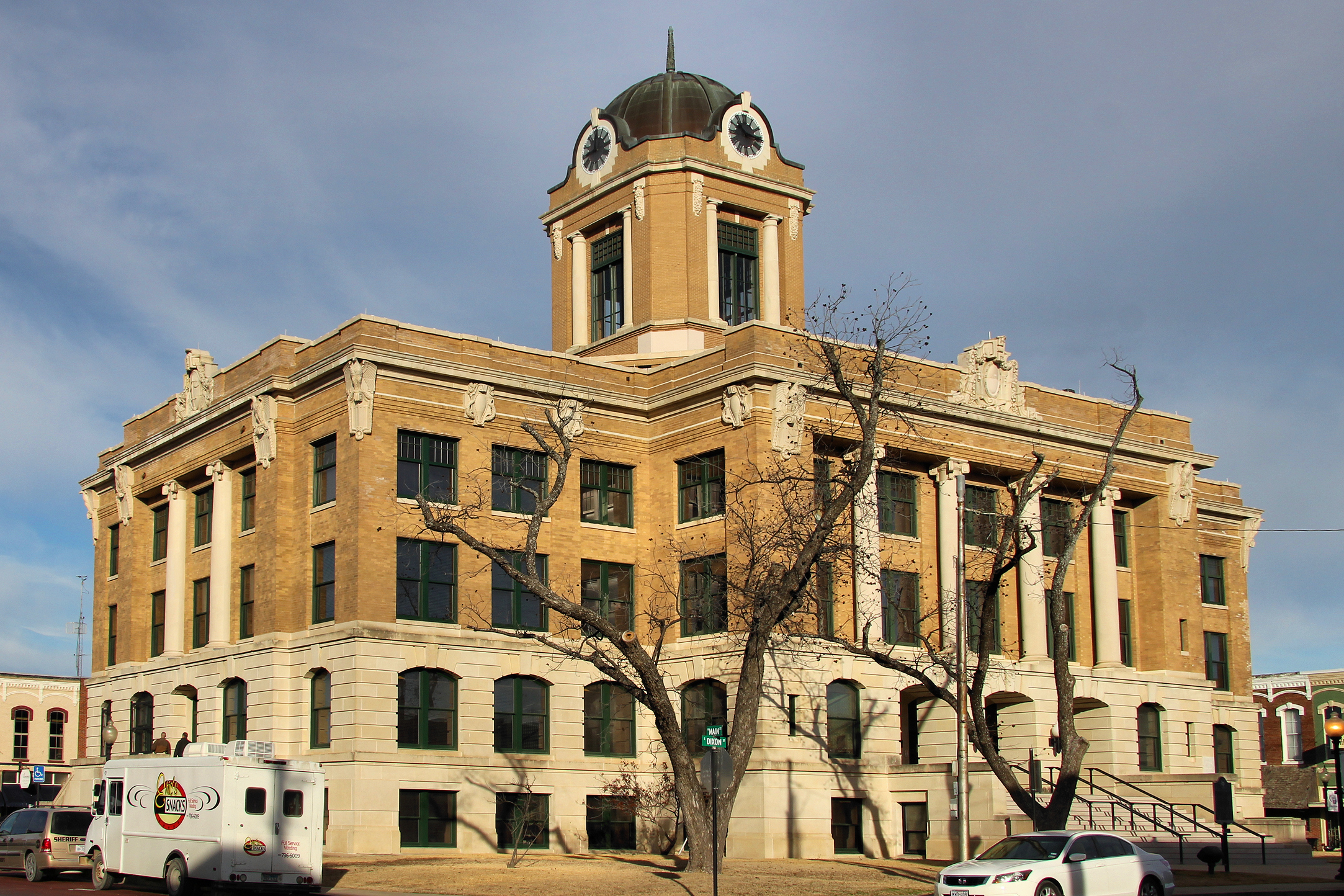
- The Cooke County Courthouse in Gainesville

- Flag

- Location within the U.S. state of Texas
- Coordinates: 33°38′00″N 97°13′00″W
- Country: United States
- State: Texas
- Founded: 1849
- Seat: Gainesville
- Largest city: Gainesville

Area
  - Total: 898 sq mi (2,330 km^{2})
  - Land: 875 sq mi (2,270 km^{2})
  - Water: 24 sq mi (62 km^{2}) 2.6%

Population (2020)
  - Total: 41,668
  - Estimate (2025): 44,461 ▲
  - Density: 47.6/sq mi (18.4/km^{2})
- Time zone: UTC−6 (Central)
  - Summer (DST): UTC−5 (CDT)
- Congressional district: 26th
- Website: www.co.cooke.tx.us

Cooke County is a county in the U.S. state of Texas. At the 2020 census, its population was 41,668. The county seat is Gainesville. The county was founded in 1848 and organized the next year. It is named for William Gordon Cooke, a soldier during the Texas Revolution. It is a part of the Texoma region.

Cooke County comprises the Gainesville, TX micropolitan statistical area, which is also included in the Dallas–Fort Worth, TX-OK combined statistical area.

== Geography ==
According to the U.S. Census Bureau, the county has an area of 898 square miles (2,330 km^{2}), of which 24 square miles (62 km^{2}) (2.6%) are covered by water.

=== Major highways ===
- Interstate 35/U.S. Highway 77
- U.S. Highway 82
- Farm to Market Road 51

=== Adjacent counties ===
- Love County, Oklahoma (north)
- Grayson County (east)
- Denton County (south)
- Wise County (southwest)
- Montague County (west)

== Demographics ==
Historical population
Census	Pop.	Note	%±
1850	220		—
1860	3,760		1,609.1%
1870	5,315		41.4%
1880	20,391		283.7%
1890	24,696		21.1%
1900	27,494		11.3%
1910	26,603		−3.2%
1920	25,667		−3.5%
1930	24,136		−6.0%
1940	24,909		3.2%
1950	22,146		−11.1%
1960	22,560		1.9%
1970	23,471		4.0%
1980	27,656		17.8%
1990	30,777		11.3%
2000	36,363		18.1%
2010	38,437		5.7%
2020	41,668		8.4%
2025 (est.)	44,461	▲	6.7%
U.S. Decennial Census; 1850–2010 2010 2020

=== Racial and ethnic composition ===
Cooke County, Texas – Racial and ethnic composition Note: the US Census treats Hispanic/Latino as an ethnic category. This table excludes Latinos from the racial categories and assigns them to a separate category. Hispanics/Latinos may be of any race.
Race / Ethnicity (NH = Non-Hispanic)	Pop 1980	Pop 1990	Pop 2000	Pop 2010	Pop 2020	% 1980	% 1990	% 2000	% 2010	% 2020
White alone (NH)	25,584	27,864	30,826	30,255	29,404	92.51%	90.54%	84.77%	78.71%	70.57%
Black or African American alone (NH)	1,202	1,151	1,087	1,018	1,181	4.35%	3.74%	2.99%	2.65%	2.83%
Native American or Alaska Native alone (NH)	146	218	304	303	360	0.53%	0.71%	0.84%	0.79%	0.86%
Asian alone (NH)	76	131	121	278	307	0.27%	0.43%	0.33%	0.72%	0.74%
Native Hawaiian or Pacific Islander alone (NH)	x	x	1	19	13	x	x	0.00%	0.05%	0.03%
Other race alone (NH)	89	5	22	35	125	0.32%	0.02%	0.06%	0.09%	0.30%
Mixed race or Multiracial (NH)	x	x	375	532	1,759	x	x	1.03%	1.38%	4.22%
Hispanic or Latino (any race)	559	1,408	3,627	5,997	8,519	2.02%	4.57%	9.97%	15.60%	20.44%
Total	27,656	30,777	36,363	38,437	41,668	100.00%	100.00%	100.00%	100.00%	100.00%

=== 2020 census ===
As of the 2020 census, the county had a population of 41,668. The median age was 40.1 years; 24.3% of residents were under 18 and 18.9% were 65 or older. For every 100 females, there were 97.8 males, and for every 100 females 18 and over, there were 95.3 males 18 and over.

The racial makeup of the county was 75.9% White, 3.0% Black or African American, 1.3% American Indian and Alaska Native, 0.8% Asian, <0.1% Native Hawaiian and Pacific Islander, 7.6% from some other race, and 11.4% from two or more races. Hispanic or Latino residents of any race comprised 20.4% of the population.

About 39.7% of residents lived in urban areas, while 60.3% lived in rural areas.

Of the 15,738 households in the county, 30.9% had children under 18 living in them, 53.3% were married-couple households, 16.8% were households with a male householder and no spouse or partner present, and 24.3% were households with a female householder and no spouse or partner present. About 25.0% of all households were made up of individuals, and 12.4% had someone living alone who was 65 or older.

The 17,716 housing units were 11.2% vacant. Among occupied housing units, 69.8% were owner-occupied and 30.2% were renter-occupied. The homeowner vacancy rate was 1.8%, and the rental vacancy rate was 8.2%.

While 2015 estimates place the median household income for Cooke County at $53,552, past estimates showed the median household income to be $37,649, with the median family income being $44,869. Males had a median income of $32,429 and females $22,065. The per capita income was $17,889. About 10.9% of families and 14.1% of the population were below the poverty line, including 19.8% of those under 18 and 10.7% of those 65 or over. Median house values in 2015 were $118,254.

== Government and infrastructure ==
The Texas Juvenile Justice Department operates the Gainesville State School in an unincorporated area in Cooke County, east of Gainesville.

=== Politics ===
Cooke County has long voted predominantly Republican; the only Democratic presidential candidate to win Cooke County since 1948 was Lyndon B. Johnson in 1964, in that year's landslide over Barry Goldwater. Cooke County has been included in the Texas's 26th congressional district since 2000, currently represented by Republican Brandon Gill. Republican David Spiller has represented Cooke County in the Texas House of Representatives since winning a special election in 2021, while Republican Brent Hagenbuch has served the county within District 30 of the Texas Senate since 2025.

Cooke County is located within District 68 of the Texas House of Representatives. Cooke County is located within District 30 of the Texas Senate.

United States presidential election results for Cooke County, Texas
Year	Republican		Democratic		Third party(ies)	
Year	No.	%	No.	%	No.	%
1912	206	9.64%	1,780	83.29%	151	7.07%
1916	353	12.91%	2,273	83.11%	109	3.99%
1920	1,003	29.60%	2,170	64.05%	215	6.35%
1924	525	12.85%	3,170	77.58%	391	9.57%
1928	2,262	53.99%	1,924	45.92%	4	0.10%
1932	470	11.02%	3,775	88.51%	20	0.47%
1936	686	15.62%	3,686	83.93%	20	0.46%
1940	1,358	23.20%	4,483	76.59%	12	0.21%
1944	919	18.61%	3,270	66.22%	749	15.17%
1948	1,194	23.76%	3,241	64.48%	591	11.76%
1952	4,385	62.20%	2,657	37.69%	8	0.11%
1956	4,164	64.33%	2,272	35.10%	37	0.57%
1960	3,983	55.50%	3,168	44.15%	25	0.35%
1964	3,117	43.23%	4,083	56.62%	11	0.15%
1968	3,799	47.96%	2,711	34.22%	1,412	17.82%
1972	6,317	78.28%	1,702	21.09%	51	0.63%
1976	4,804	51.50%	4,483	48.05%	42	0.45%
1980	6,760	62.58%	3,842	35.57%	200	1.85%
1984	8,260	71.43%	3,278	28.35%	26	0.22%
1988	7,196	62.84%	4,217	36.82%	39	0.34%
1992	5,299	40.50%	3,105	23.73%	4,680	35.77%
1996	7,320	59.53%	3,782	30.76%	1,195	9.72%
2000	10,128	75.19%	3,153	23.41%	188	1.40%
2004	11,908	78.82%	3,142	20.80%	57	0.38%
2008	11,871	78.86%	3,051	20.27%	132	0.88%
2012	11,951	83.28%	2,246	15.65%	154	1.07%
2016	13,181	82.61%	2,352	14.74%	422	2.64%
2020	15,596	81.98%	3,210	16.87%	219	1.15%
2024	16,975	83.02%	3,310	16.19%	162	0.79%

United States Senate election results for Cooke County, Texas1
Year	Republican		Democratic		Third party(ies)	
Year	No.	%	No.	%	No.	%
2024	16,284	80.22%	3,620	17.83%	395	1.95%

United States Senate election results for Cooke County, Texas2
Year	Republican		Democratic		Third party(ies)	
Year	No.	%	No.	%	No.	%
2020	15,516	82.20%	2,999	15.89%	362	1.92%

Texas Gubernatorial election results for Cooke County
Year	Republican		Democratic		Third party(ies)	
Year	No.	%	No.	%	No.	%
2022	12,815	83.62%	2,308	15.06%	202	1.32%

== Communities ==
=== Cities ===
- Callisburg
- Gainesville
- Lindsay
- Muenster
- Valley View

=== Towns ===
- Oak Ridge
- Road Runner

=== Census-designated places ===
- Lake Kiowa
- Myra

=== Unincorporated communities ===
- Bulcher
- Burns City
- Dexter
- Era
- Hood
- Leo
- Lois
- Marysville
- Mountain Springs
- Prairie Point
- Rosston
- Sivells Bend
- Sturgeon
- Walnut Bend
- Woodbine

=== Ghost towns ===
- Bloomfield
- Coesfield
- Custer City
- Freemound
- Hemming

== See also ==
- List of museums in North Texas
- National Register of Historic Places listings in Cooke County, Texas
- Recorded Texas Historic Landmarks in Cooke County
- Cooke County Library
