= Glenn Henry =

Glenn Henry may refer to:

- Glen Monroe Henry (1912–1983), American circus act entertainer and operator, late of Texas
- Glenn Henry (band leader) (1915–1993), American big band leader, late of California
- Glenn Henry (IT entrepreneur) (born 1942), American IT entrepreneur, executive, and inventor
- Glenn L. Henry (1921–2002), American lawyer and politician

== See also ==
- Henry Glen (1739–1814), U.S. Congressman
