= KPFC =

KPFC may refer to:

- Keilor Park Football Club
- Kirkley & Pakefield F.C.
- Kiveton Park F.C.
- KPFC (FM), a radio station (91.9 FM) licensed to Callisburg, Texas, United States
- The ICAO identifier for Pacific City State Airport in Pacific City, Oregon, United States
