= Lang & Witchell =

American architectural firm

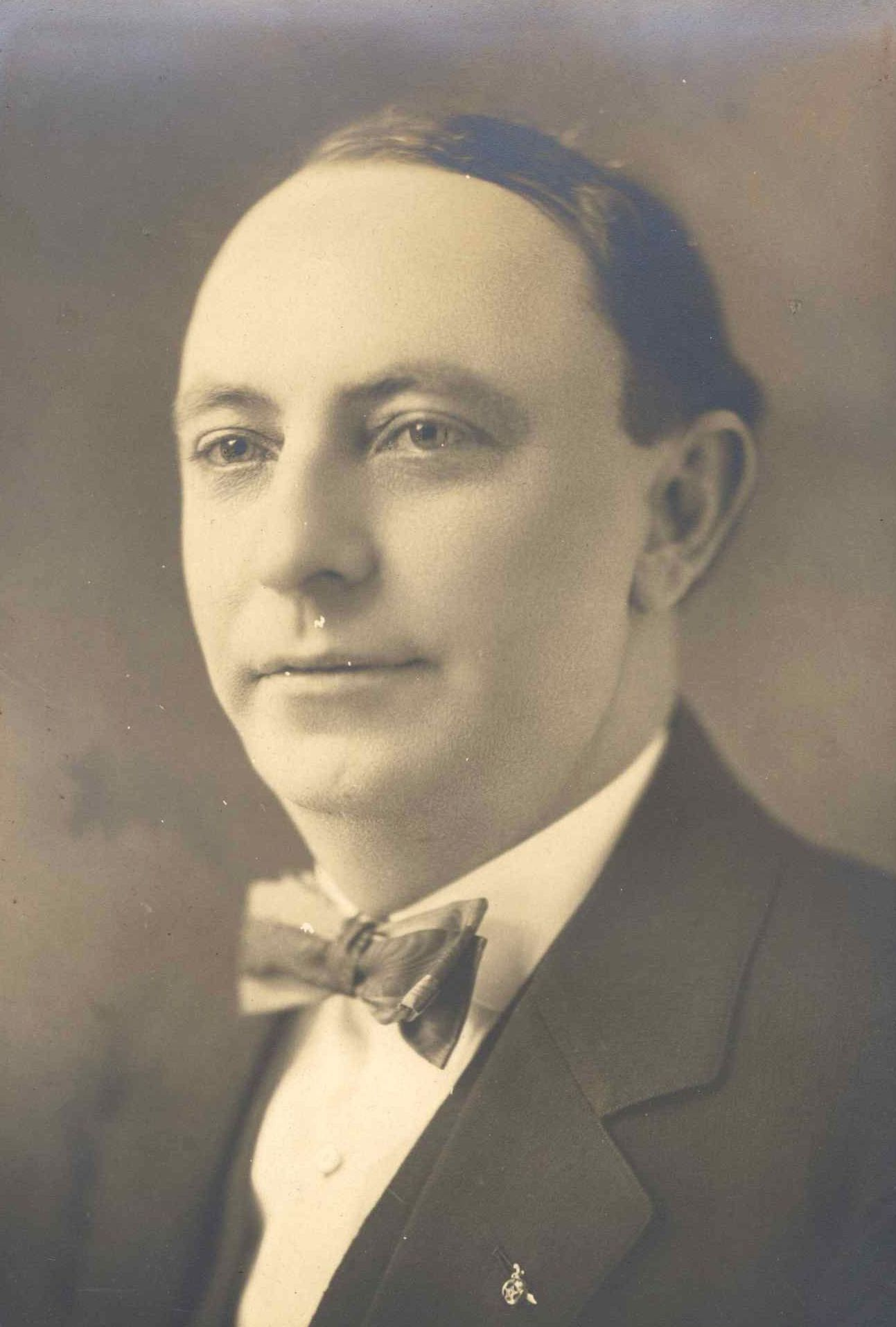
- Frank Witchell

Practice information
- Founders: Otto H. Lang; Frank O. Witchell
- Founded: 1905
- Dissolved: 1942
- Location: Dallas, Texas

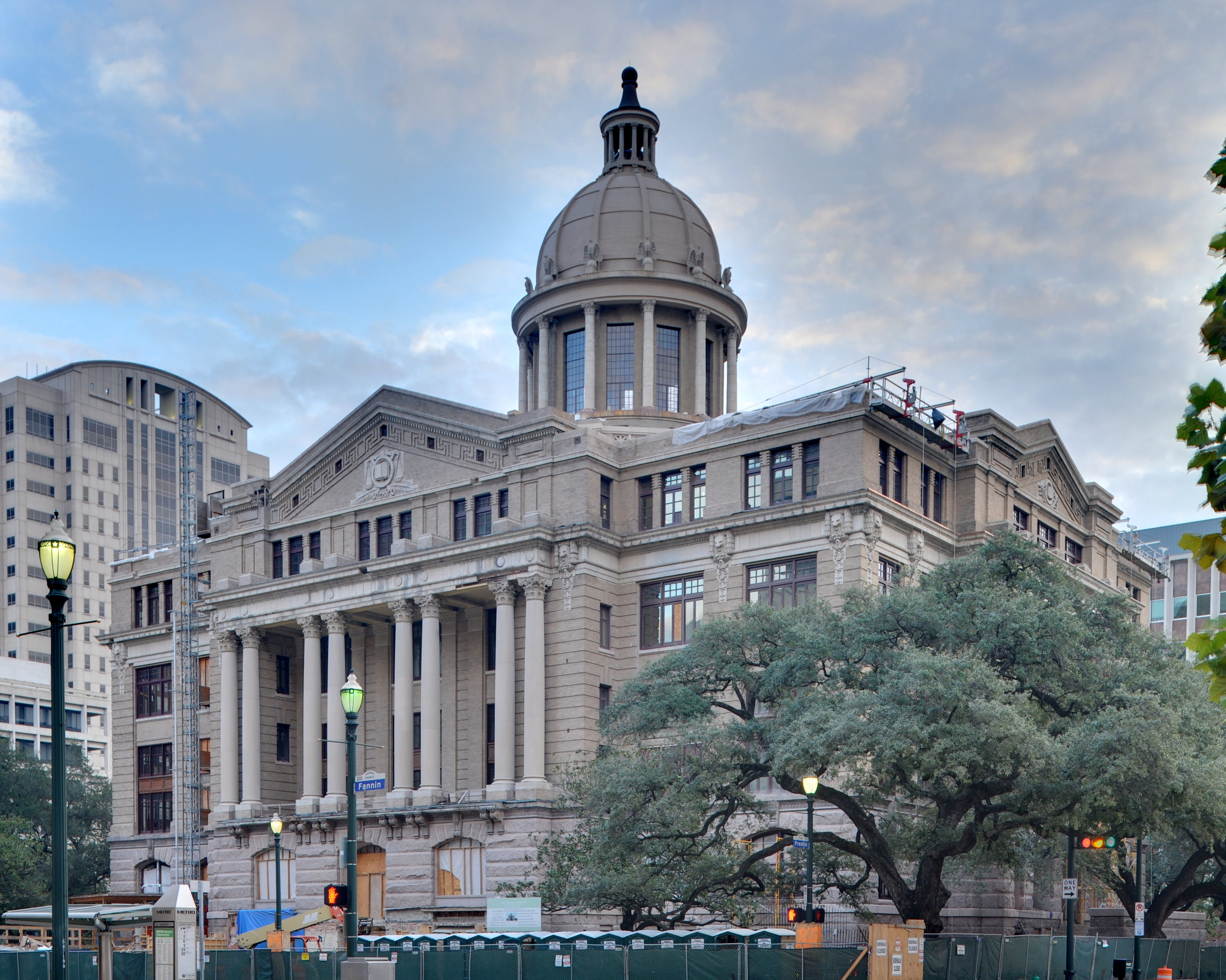
Harris County Courthouse, Houston, Texas. 1907.

Lang & Witchell was a prominent architectural firm in Dallas, Texas, active from 1905 to 1942.

== History ==
Senior partner Otto H. Lang was born in Freiburg in 1864. He graduated in 1888 with a degree in structural engineering from the University of Karlsruhe, also studying architecture. He then relocated to the United States, eventually settling in Dallas, where he worked for the Texas and Pacific Railroad, eventually becoming its senior architect and engineer. Frank O. Witchell was born in South Wales in 1879. As a child, his family relocated to San Antonio, Texas. As a teenager he entered the office of J. Riely Gordon, one of the best-known architects in the state. In 1898 he began work as a designer with Sanguinet & Staats in Fort Worth.

In 1905, the two men separated from their employers, founding the new firm of Lang & Witchell. This firm would rise to become the most esteemed architectural firm in Dallas.

The partnership was dissolved in 1938, when Witchell retired duo to failing health. Lang continued to operate the firm until 1942, when he too retired. He continued on in an advisory capacity with architect Grayson Gill. Lang would die in 1947, and Witchell in 1952.

== Legacy ==
The firm is credited with designing a number of buildings that are listed on the National Register of Historic Places.

== Architectural works ==
Caption
Year	Building	Address	City	State	Notes	Image	Reference
1905	Columbian Club	S Ervay St and Griffin St E	Dallas	Texas	Demolished.		
1906	Y. M. C. A. Building	Commerce and S St Paul Sts	Dallas	Texas	Demolished.		
1907	Dallas High School	2218 Bryan St	Dallas	Texas	Listed on the NRHP in 1996.		
1907	First National Bank Building	S Main and W 3rd Sts	McGregor	Texas			
1907	Harris County Courthouse	301 Fannin St	Houston	Texas	Listed on the NRHP in 1981.		
1908	Howard County Courthouse	300 S Main St	Big Spring	Texas	Demolished.		
1909	Hotel Grace	102 Cypress St	Abilene	Texas			
1909	Scurry County Courthouse	1806 25th St	Snyder	Texas	Extant, but altered almost beyond recognition.		
1910	Cooke County Courthouse	101 S Dixon St	Gainesville	Texas	Designed in association with Garrett & Collins of Gainesville. Listed on the NRHP in 1991.		
1910	Sanger Brothers Department Store	716 Elm St	Dallas	Texas	Listed on the NRHP in 1975.		
1910	Sears, Roebuck & Company Warehouse	1601 S Lamar St	Dallas	Texas			
1910	Southland Life Insurance Company Building	1416-1422 Commerce St	Dallas	Texas	Demolished.		
1910	Wichita Falls Union Depot	500 9th St	Wichita Falls	Texas	Demolished.		
1911	Dallas Cotton Exchange Building	401 S Akard St	Dallas	Texas	Demolished.		
1911	House	1766 Pasadena Ave	Houston	Texas			
1911	Nacogdoches County Courthouse	101 W Main St	Nacogdoches	Texas	Demolished.		
1911	Southwestern Life Insurance Company Building	1500 Main St	Dallas	Texas	Demolished in 1972.		
1912	Didaco and Ida Bianchi House	4503 Reiger Ave	Dallas	Texas	Listed on the NRHP in 1995.		
1912	Busch Building	1509 Main St	Dallas	Texas	Designed in association with Barnett, Haynes & Barnett of St. Louis. Now known as the Kirby Building, and listed on the NRHP in 1980.		
1912	Johnson County Courthouse	1 Public Sq	Cleburne	Texas	Listed on the NRHP in 1988.		
1912	Sears, Roebuck & Company Store	1401 S Lamar St	Dallas	Texas	Presently a mixed-use development known as Southside on Lamar.		
1913	Riggins Hotel	801 Austin Ave	Waco	Texas	Later known as the Raleigh Hotel and Raleigh Building.		
1913	Rufus W. Higginbotham House	5002 Swiss Ave	Dallas	Texas	Considered to be one of the purest examples of Prairie School architecture in Dallas, this house is a contributing property to the Swiss Avenue Historic District, listed on the NRHP in 1974.		
1913	Tannehill (Western Union) Building	2030 Main St	Dallas	Texas			
1914	Higginbotham-Bailey-Logan Company Building	900 Jackson St	Dallas	Texas	Presently a mixed-use development known as Founders Square.		
1914	Sally Salzenstein House	2419 South Blvd	Dallas	Texas			
1915	James W. Fannin Elementary School	4800 Ross Ave	Dallas	Texas	Listed on the NRHP in 1995.		
1916	American Exchange National Bank Building	1407 Main St	Dallas	Texas	Designed in association with Alfred C. Bossom of New York, demolished.		
1916	Belford Apartments	260 S Main St	Paris	Texas	Designed in association with Curtis, Broad & Lightfoot of Paris.		
1916	Fire Station No. 2	1011 Pine Bluff St	Paris	Texas	Designed in association with Curtis, Broad & Lightfoot of Paris.		
1916	First Baptist Church	207 S Church St	Paris	Texas			
1916	First National Bank Building	104 Bonham St	Paris	Texas	Designed in association with Curtis, Broad & Lightfoot of Paris.		
1916	Gibraltar Hotel	265 S Main St	Paris	Texas	Designed in association with Curtis, Broad & Lightfoot of Paris.		
1917	Jefferson Hotel	Wood and Houston Sts	Dallas	Texas	Demolished in 1975.		
1917	Majestic Theatre	1925 Elm St	Dallas	Texas	Designed in association with John Eberson of Chicago.		
1917	Y. W. C. A. Building	315 E Franklin Ave	El Paso	Texas			
1919	Magnolia Petroleum Company Building	108 S Akard St	Dallas	Texas	Designed in association with Alfred C. Bossom of New York as the tallest building in Texas. Listed on the NRHP in 1978.		
1922	Amarillo Municipal Auditorium	600 S Buchanan St	Amarillo	Texas	Designed in association with Smith & Townes of Amarillo, demolished in 1968.		
1922	Booker T. Washington High School	2501 Flora St	Dallas	Texas			
1922	Paul N. Dunbar Elementary School	4200 Metropolitan Ave	Dallas	Texas			
1923	Chevrolet Motor Company Building	3221 Commerce St	Dallas	Texas	Listed on the NRHP in 2003.		
1923	Dallas Athletic Club	N St Paul and Elm Sts	Dallas	Texas	Demolished in 1981.		
1923	Highland Park Town Hall	4700 Drexel Dr	Highland Park	Texas			
1923	Lone Star Gas Company South Building	301 S Harwood St	Dallas	Texas			
1924	Hilton Hotel	1933 Main St	Dallas	Texas	Listed on the NRHP in 1985.		
1924	Nurses' Home	708 S College St	McKinney	Texas	A contributing property to the Old McKinney Hospital, listed on the NRHP in 1987.		
1925	Dallas Cotton Exchange Building	608 N St Paul St	Dallas	Texas	Designed in association with Thomson & Swaine of Dallas. Demolished in 1994.		
1926	Clarence R. Miller House	5112 Swiss Ave	Dallas	Texas	A contributing property to the Swiss Avenue Historic District, listed on the NRHP in 1974.		
1926	Crazy Water Hotel	401 N Oak Ave	Mineral Wells	Texas	Designed in association with Withers & Morrell of Dallas.		
1926	Dallas County Records Building	509 Main St	Dallas	Texas			
1926	Episcopal Church of the Incarnation	3966 McKinney Ave	Dallas	Texas			
1927	San Angelo Telephone Company Building	14 W Twohig Ave	San Angelo	Texas	Listed on the NRHP in 1988.		
1927	Southwestern Bell Telephone Company Building	308 S Akard St	Dallas	Texas	Designed in association with company architect Irving R. Timlin. Now known as Three AT&T Plaza.		
1928	Eastland County Courthouse	100 W Main St	Eastland	Texas			
1928	Gulf States Insurance Company Building	1415 Main St	Dallas	Texas	Now known as Third Rail Lofts.		
1928	University Park Elementary School	3505 Amherst Ave	University Park	Texas	Demolished in 2017.		
1928	Waco Hall	Baylor University	Waco	Texas	Designed in association with Harry L. Spicer of Waco.		
1928	Wichita Falls City Hall and Memorial Auditorium	1300 7th St	Wichita Falls	Texas	Designed in association with Voelcker & Dixon of Wichita Falls.		
1929	Dallas Power and Light Company Building	1506 Commerce St	Dallas	Texas			
1929	Waco City Hall	300 Austin Ave	Waco	Texas	Designed in association with Harry L. Spicer of Waco.		
1930	First State Bank and Trust Company Building	100 W 25th St	Bryan	Texas	Listed on the NRHP in 1987.		
1931	Lone Star Gas Company North Building	301 S Harwood St	Dallas	Texas			
1933	State Highway Building	125 E 11th St	Austin	Texas	Designed in association with Adams & Adams of Austin. Listed on the NRHP in 1998.		
1936	U. S. Post Office Terminal Annex	207 S Houston St	Dallas	Texas			
