= Chevrolet Motor Company Building =

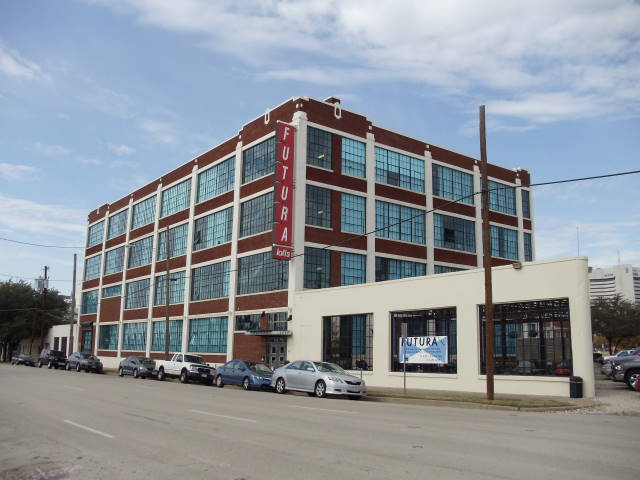
- Chevrolet Motor Company Building in 2011
- Interactive map of the Chevrolet Motor Company Building area
- Alternative names: Deep Ellum Lofts

General information
- Status: In Use
- Type: Historic: Industry, Government; Current: Apartments
- Architectural style: Early Commercial
- Location: 3221 Commerce Street, Dallas, Texas, United States
- Coordinates: 32°47′4″N 96°46′36″W
- Construction started: 1923
- Completed: 1923

Technical details
- Grounds: less than one acre

Design and construction
- Architect: Lang & Witchell
- Main contractor: Hughes-O'Rourke Construction Co.
- Chevrolet Motor Company Building
- U.S. National Register of Historic Places
- Location within Texas Location within the United States
- NRHP reference No.: 03000277
- Added to NRHP: April 18, 2003

== Description ==
The 1923 Chevrolet Motor Company Building is a 4-story Commercial Style concrete and brick building at 3221 Commerce Street, in a historically commercial and industrial area east of downtown Dallas, Texas. Designed by the Dallas firm Lang and Witchell and built by Hughes-O'Rourke Construction Co., the flat-roofed building features an expressed concrete structure separating wide window bays and red brick spandrels. Like many buildings in the area, the open, industrial plan of the Chevrolet Motor Company Building has recently been divided into apartments for residential reuse. With few exterior changes, the building retains a high degree of historic and architectural integrity.

Chevrolet remained in the building until 1935, and in 1936 the United States government operated a US Resettlement Administration office in the building that included Rural Resettlement Regional Office No. 8 and the District Finance Office. In 1939, the U.S. Department of Agriculture moved into the building. The agriculture department included the Resettlement Administration and the Farm Security Administration. The United States Treasury Department had their State Accounts Section in the building as well. Texas Rural Communities, Inc. also briefly had an office in the building.

== See also ==
- National Register of Historic Places listings in Dallas County, Texas
