= 1910 Harris County Courthouse =

Historic building in Houston, Texas, U.S.

- Harris County Courthouse of 1910
- U.S. National Register of Historic Places
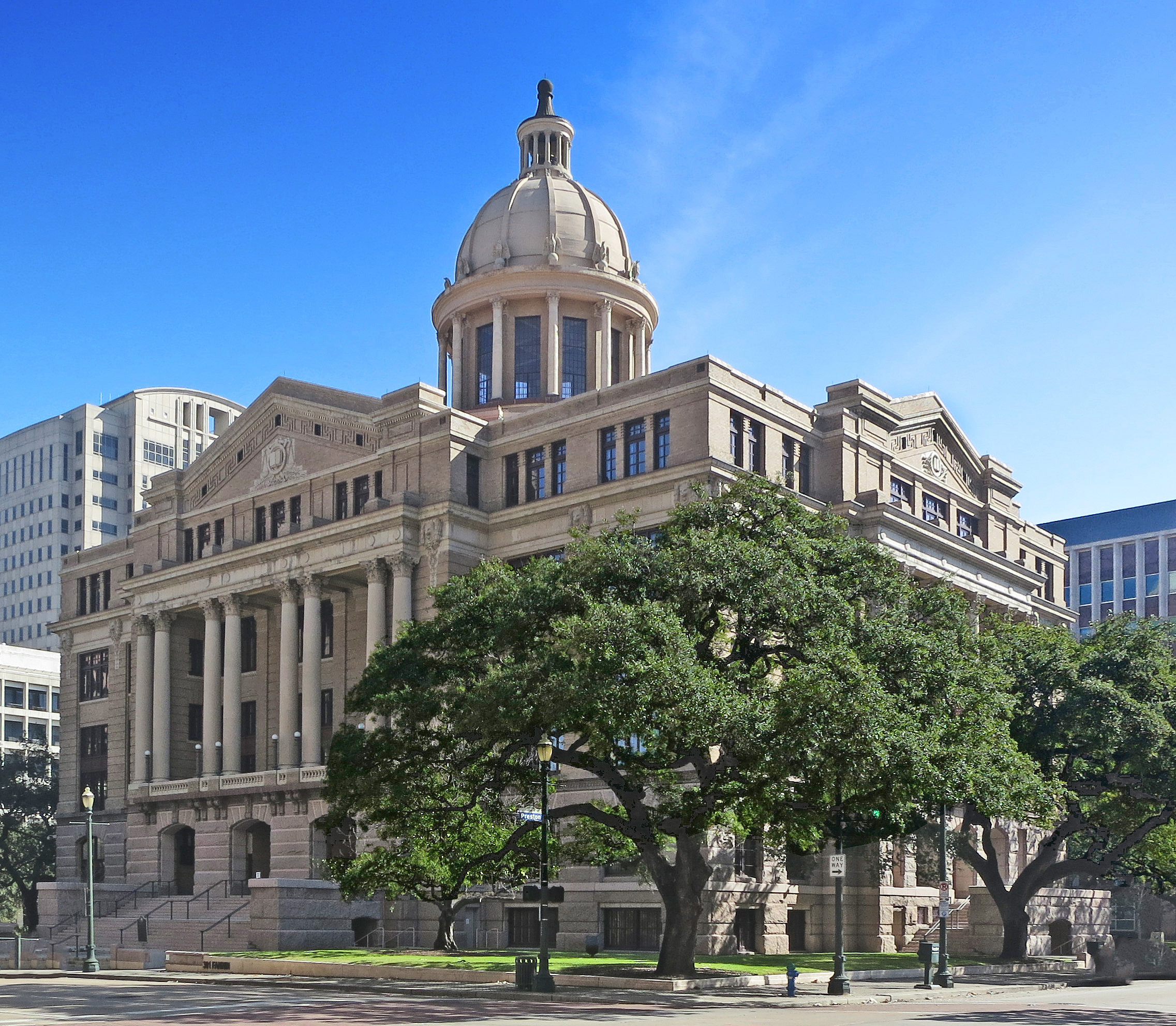
- Courthouse building in 2013

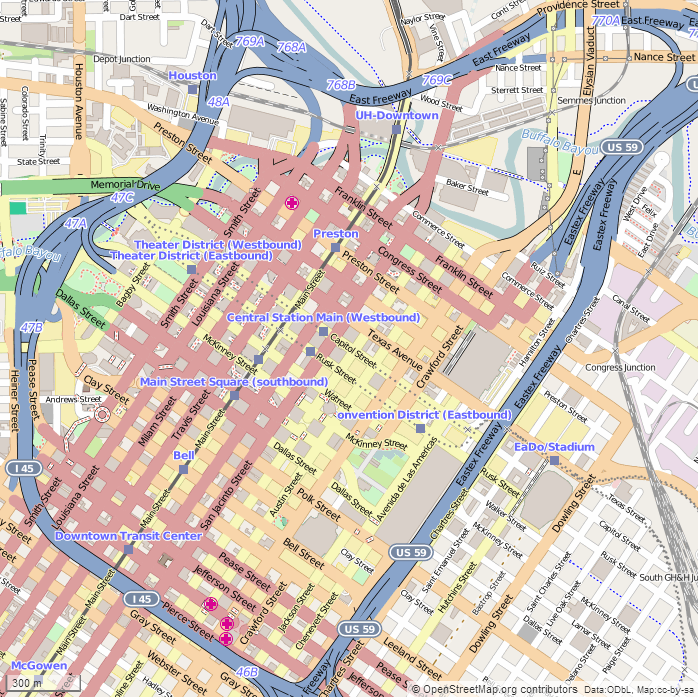
- Location within Houston Downtown Location within Texas Location within the United States
- Location: 301 Fannin St., Houston, Texas
- Coordinates: 29°45′40″N 95°21′34″W
- Area: 1 acre (0.40 ha)
- Built: 1907
- Built by: American Construction Company
- Architect: Lang & Witchell, Charles E. Barglebaugh
- Architectural style: Classical Revival
- NRHP reference No.: 81000629
- Added to NRHP: May 13, 1981

The Harris County Courthouse of 1910 is one of the courthouse buildings operated by the Harris County, Texas government, in Downtown Houston. It is in the Classical Revival architectural style and has six stories. Two courtrooms inside are two stories each. It was listed on the National Register of Historic Places on May 13, 1981.

It houses the Texas Court of Appeals districts 1 and 14.

== History ==
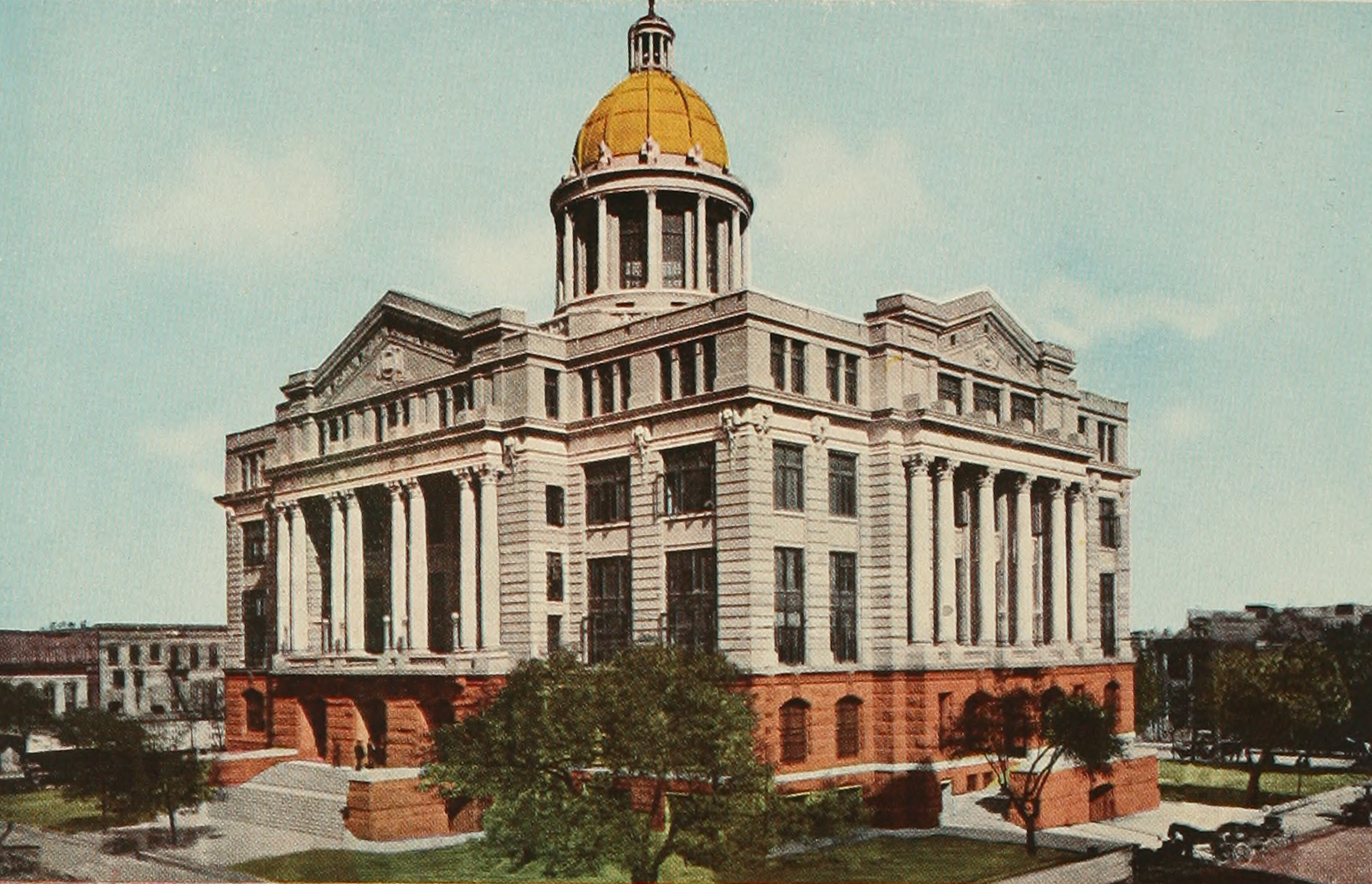
Harris County Courthouse in 1913

At the time of its opening the Texas district courts number 11, 55, and 61 moved into the courthouse.

In 1930 the cupola was removed. There were previously stairs made of granite that connected the second floor with the ground, but they were removed in 1950. The courthouse received a modernization in 1953 which updated the interior. In 2011 the courthouse was rededicated after an extensive renovation, which began in March 2009, and restored the interior to the original style. The renovation had a cost of about $65 million, and included adding a cupola that was created in the 1980s as well as re-adding the granite steps. The reopening was in August 2011.

== See also ==
- National Register of Historic Places listings in downtown Houston, Texas
- List of county courthouses in Texas
