= Norfleet Giddings Bone =

American architect

Norfleet Giddings Bone (August 12, 1892 – January 24, 1978) was a landscape architect and civil engineer whose career in the military and the private sector spanned nearly five decades.

== Biography ==
He was born in Gainesville, Texas, but received his secondary education and first college degree in New Mexico. In 1911, he graduated from the preparatory department of the New Mexico College of Agriculture and Mechanic Arts (New Mexico A&M) in Mesilla Park. He continued on at New Mexico A&M and received a Bachelor of Science degree in civil engineering in 1915.

Bone served twice in the United States Army. He enlisted first in 1917 and was part of the First Aero Squadron based in New Mexico. Between 1917 and 1920 he served tours in England, France and Germany. He left military service in 1920 but rejoined in 1927 after having received a second Bachelor of Science degree (1923), this time in landscape architecture from Texas A&M University.

During his second enlistment, he served with the United States Army Air Corps based at Fort Sam Houston in San Antonio, Texas. While there, he was appointed the assistant to the Quartermaster General. During this enlistment, which ended in 1932, he also served as the Supervising Landscape Architect and Landscape Engineer at Randolph Air Force Base in San Antonio, and as a supervisor of landscape design at Barksdale Air Force Base in Shreveport, Louisiana.

Upon leaving the Army for a second time in 1932, Bone continued to work in the fields of landscape design and civil engineering for the National Park Service (NPS), the Army Corps of Engineers, and the Texas State Parks Board (now the Texas Parks and Wildlife Department). While with NPS, he was first assigned to work at Balmorhea State Park in Texas, but in 1936 became the acting superintendent for Bastrop State Park, also in Texas. His contributions at Bastrop included designs for a footbridge across Copperas Creek, as well as general landscape design and the landscaping around Smithville Dam at Copperas Creek.

Bone's work with the Army Corps of Engineers occurred during World War II, at which time he was charged with maintaining the landscaping of the flying fields at military bases in the San Antonio area. During the 1950s and early 1960s, he served at the Texas State Parks Board as the regional supervisor of the Austin, Dallas and Gainesville areas, retiring in 1963. He died in 1978, aged 85.
