= Southwestern Life Insurance Building =

- Interactive map of the Southwestern Life Insurance Building area

General information
- Status: Demolished
- Type: Office
- Location: 1500 Main Street, Dallas, Texas, United States
- Coordinates: 32.7804°N 96.8014°W
- Opening: 1912
- Demolished: 1972

Height
- Roof: 173 ft (53 m)

Technical details
- Floor count: 16

Design and construction
- Architects: Lang & Witchell

The Southwestern Life Insurance Building was a 16-story, 110,000 sf high-rise in Downtown Dallas, Texas, designed by Lang & Witchell architects in the Sullivanesque style. It was built in 1912 and demolished 1972. Today it is the site of Pegasus Plaza, one of the first parks to open in the city's central business district.

== History ==
According to a 1905 Sanborn Map of Dallas, the southeast corner of Main St. and S. Akard St. consisted of a three-story brick building, divided into narrow sections, with the intersection address of 332 Main Street. Businesses such as the Rock Island Railroad Company, Metropolitan Book Exchange, Dallas Healing Institute and Dallas Business College were all associated with addresses here, believed to have been erected in 1886 by Judge Nat M. Burford (1824-1898).

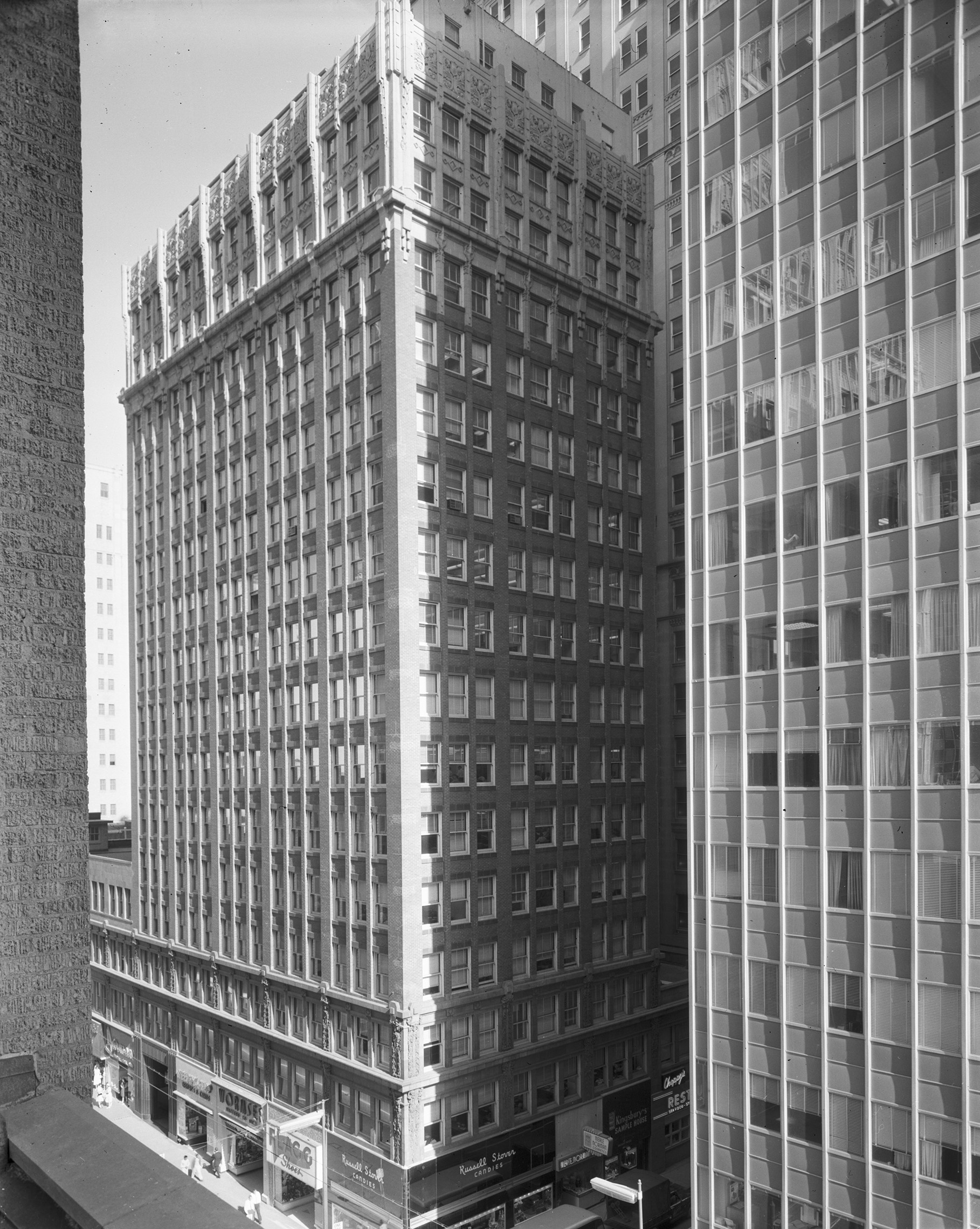
Southwestern Life Building (Otto H. Lang, architect)

The Southwestern Life Insurance Company formed in 1903 and established its home office at 310 Main Street in Dallas. On March 20, 1910, company president and future Dallas Mayor Henry D. Lindsley announced that the company purchased property from Mr. and Mrs. W.M. Freeman and Miss May Burford, in a deal worth $300,000, for the erection of a "monster building" of up to 16 stories in height. It was said to be “the largest real estate deal ever made in either the city or county of Dallas by individuals or companies.” Located at 1500 Main Street, the high-rise contained a series of shops at street level, with tenants over the decades that included Russell Stover Candies and Bond Clothing Stores. Southwestern Life occupied its namesake building until 1964 when it moved to a new structure six blocks north on Ross Avenue designed by George Dahl.

In 1965, businessman and future Texas Governor Bill Clements purchased 1500 Main Street for a reported $1.2 million. While keeping any plans for the tower a secret, several years later he gave all remaining tenants notice to vacate by December 28, 1971. The structure was demolished in 1972 and a surface parking lot took its place in order to serve an increasingly automobile-dependent central business district.

The City of Dallas purchased the parking lot for about $1 million in the early 1990s. Work began on Pegasus Plaza in 1992 and the project, part of a revitalization effort for Main Street that included wide sidewalks and brick crosswalks, was completed in 1994.

Southwestern Life Insurance Company was acquired by Houston-based Tenneco Inc. in 1980 and filed for bankruptcy in 1995. Its second headquarters on Ross Avenue was occupied by The Beck Group from 2003 until 2019.
