= Cooke County Courthouse =

- U.S. National Register of Historic Places
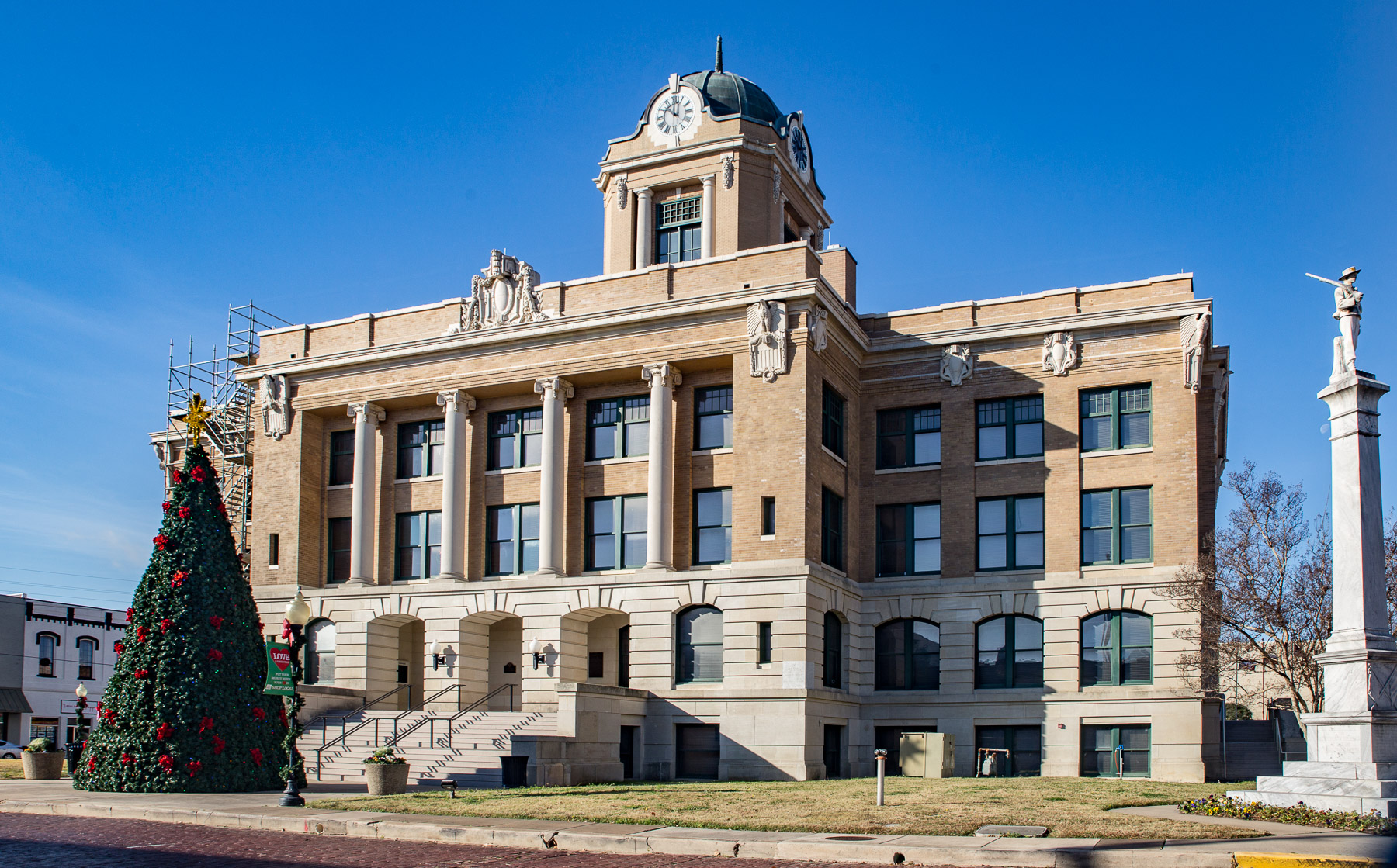
- Cooke County Courthouse (2021)

- Location within Texas Location within the United States
- Location: 101 S Dixon St, Gainesville, Texas
- Coordinates: 33°37′25″N 97°08′44″W
- Built: 1912
- Architect: Lang & Witchell
- Architectural style: École des Beaux-Arts
- NRHP reference No.: 91000336
- Added to NRHP: March 22, 1991

The Cooke County Courthouse is a historic courthouse in Gainesville, Texas. It is listed on the National Register of Historic Places.

== History ==
The courthouse was designed by Lang & Witchell, and was constructed in 1912. It was added to the National Register of Historic Places in 1991, and designated a Texas Historic Landmark in 1988.

=== Confederate monument ===
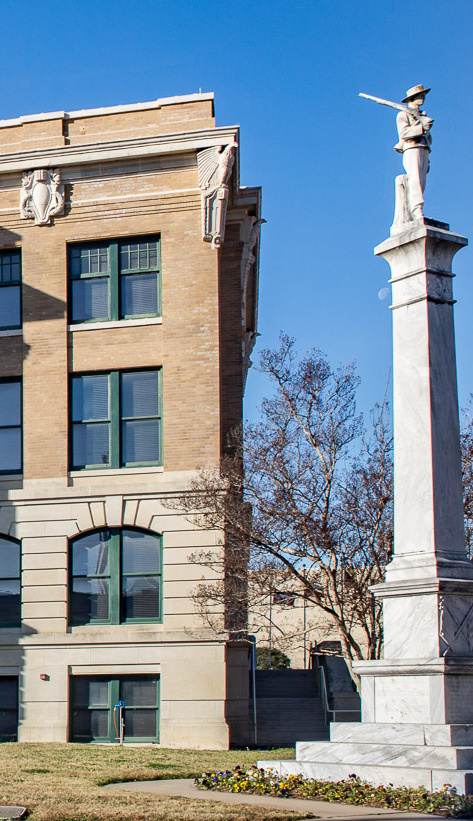
Detail of Confederate monument at Cooke County Courthouse.

On the lawn of the courthouse stands a monolith topped by a 1911 statue of a Confederate soldier. The inscription at the base of the statue reads, “no nation rose so white and fair none fell so pure of crime” in a statement typical of Confederate monuments that minimized the human impact of slavery and romanticized the Lost Cause of the Confederacy. In 2020, in the wake of the murder of George Floyd and the removal of Confederate statues across the United States, Cooke County Commissioners voted to retain the statue outside the courthouse. Protesters advocating against the statue were later sentenced to prison time for "obstructing a highway". The protesters petitioned their case to the U.S. Supreme Court, who in 2024 declined to review the case.

== See also ==
- National Register of Historic Places listings in Cooke County, Texas
