= Gainesville, Texas =

- City
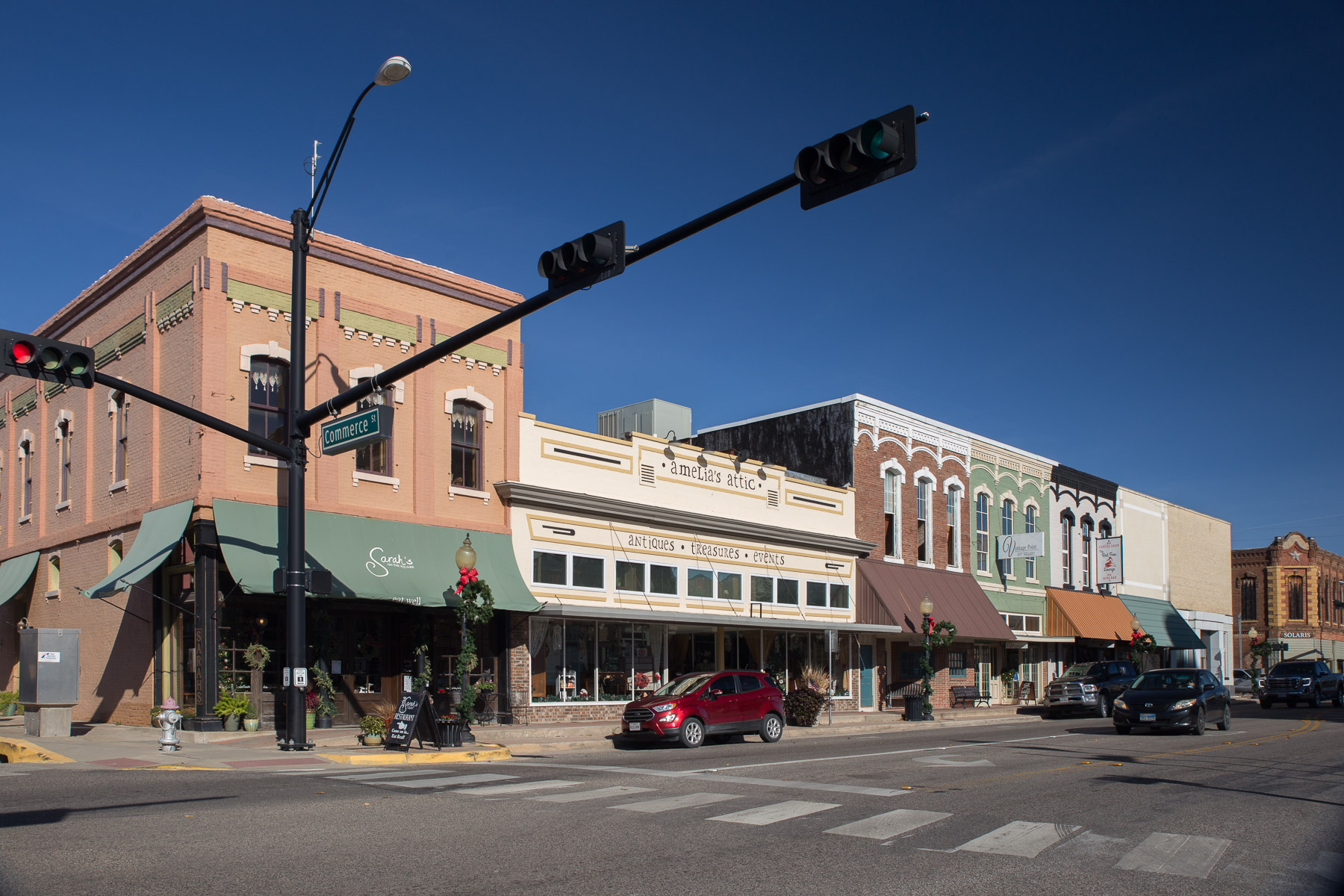
- Downtown Gainesville
- Motto(s): "Totally Texas, All American"
- Location of Gainesville, Texas
- Coordinates: 33°37′49″N 97°07′55″W
- Country: United States
- State: Texas
- County: Cooke

Area
  - Total: 19.33 sq mi (50.07 km^{2})
  - Land: 19.31 sq mi (50.00 km^{2})
  - Water: 0.027 sq mi (0.07 km^{2})
- Elevation: 761 ft (232 m)

Population (2020)
  - Total: 17,394
  - Density: 901/sq mi (347.9/km^{2})
- Time zone: UTC-6 (Central (CST))
  - Summer (DST): UTC-5 (CDT)
- ZIP codes: 76240-76241
- Area code: 940
- FIPS code: 48-27984
- GNIS feature ID: 2410559
- Website: www.gainesville.tx.us

Gainesville is a city in and the county seat of Cooke County, Texas, United States and is part of the Dallas-Fort Worth, TX-OK combined statistical area. Its population was 17,394 at the 2020 census. It is part of the Texoma region and is an important Agri-business center.

== History ==
Founded in 1850, the city of Gainesville was established on a 40-acre (16 ha) tract of land donated by Mary E. Clark. City residents called their new community "Liberty", which proved short-lived, as Liberty, Texas, already existed. One of the original settlers of Cooke County, Colonel William Fitzhugh, suggested that the town be named after General Edmund Pendleton Gaines. Gaines, a United States general under whom Fitzhugh had served, had been sympathetic to the Texas Revolution.

The first hint of prosperity arrived with the Butterfield Overland Mail stagecoach in September 1858, bringing freight, passengers, and mail. In 1860, Cooke County voted against secession. In 1862, during the Civil War, the Great Hanging at Gainesville, a controversial trial and lynching of 40 suspected Union loyalists, brought the new town to the attention of the state and came close to ripping the county apart. In the decade after the Civil War, Gainesville had its first period of extended growth, catalyzed by the expansion of the cattle industry in Texas. Gainesville, only 7 miles (11 km) from the Oklahoma border, became a supply point for cowboys driving herds north to Kansas. The merchants of Gainesville reaped considerable benefits from the passing cattle drives.

Within 20 years, its population increased from a few hundred to more than 2,000. Gainesville was incorporated on February 17, 1873, and by 1890 was established as a commercial and shipping point for area ranchers and farmers. In the late 1870s, two factors drastically altered the historic landscape of North-central Texas. The first of these was barbed wire. In 1875, Henry B. Sanborn, a regional sales agent for Joseph Glidden's Bar Fence Company of DeKalb, Illinois, traveled to Texas. That autumn, he chose Gainesville as one of his initial distribution points for the newly invented barbed wire, which his employer had patented the previous year. On his first visit to Gainesville, he sold 10 reels of the wire to the Cleaves and Fletcher hardware store—the first spools of barbed wire ever sold in Texas.

World War II had an enormous impact on Cooke County. Camp Howze, an army infantry training camp, was established on some of the best farmland in the county. The construction of the camp helped bring Cooke County out of the Great Depression by providing jobs. The county population doubled and the area boomed.

Since then, tourism has brought renewed prosperity to the area. The return of Amtrak on June 14, 1999, brought Gainesville back full circle to one of the original sources of its growth and success. In the early 1990s, Gainesville had 600 businesses and a population of 14,587. By 2020, the population had grown to 17,394.

=== Courthouse ===
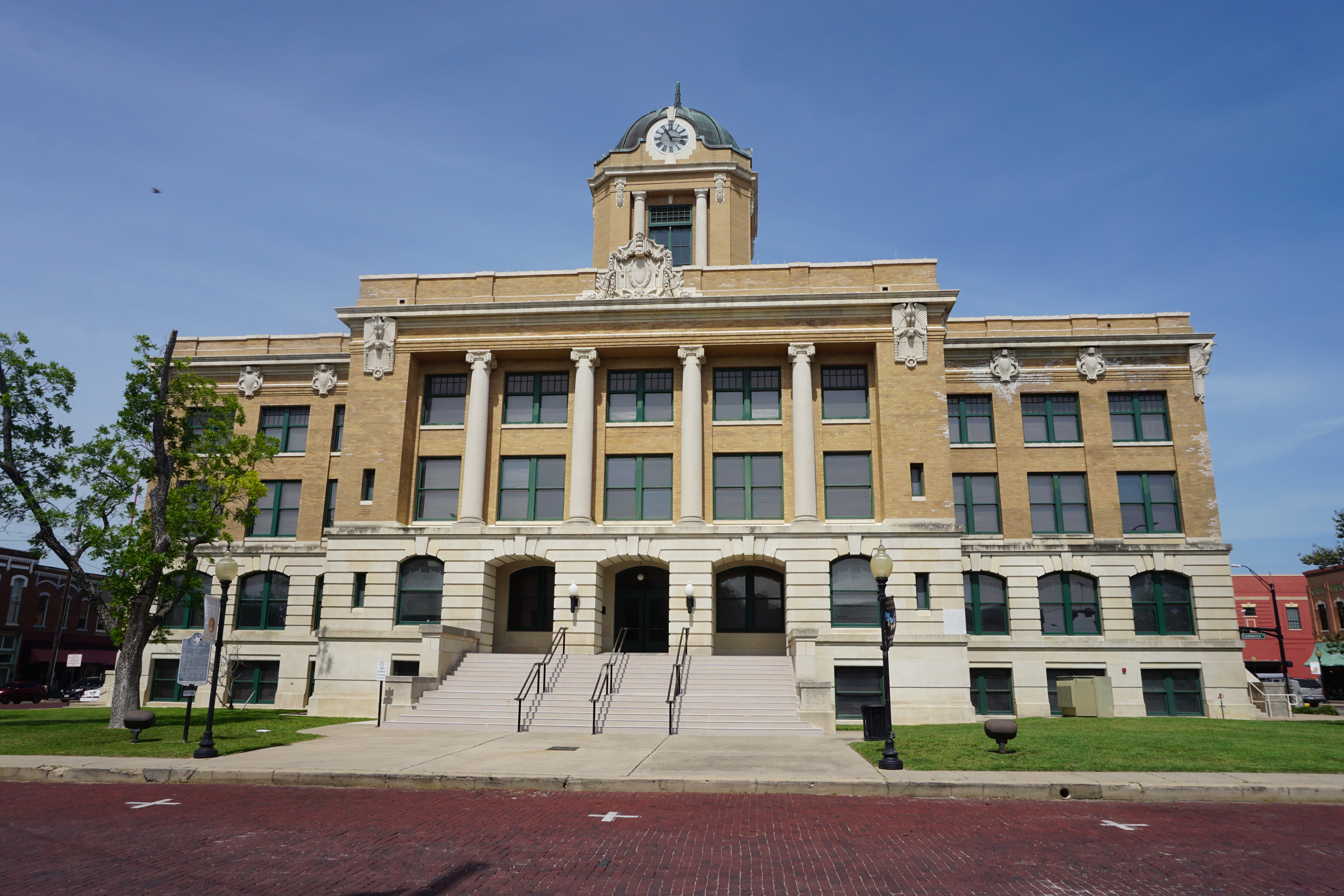
Cooke County Courthouse

Gainesville is home to a courthouse with an octagonal rotunda topped by stained glass, erected in 1910. "The 1912 Cooke County Courthouse was designed by the Dallas firm of Lang & Witchell. The courthouse was designed in the Beaux Arts style with some Prairie Style features and influences from famed Chicago architect Louis Sullivan. The courthouse in the center of Gainesville features black and white marbled interiors and a tall central atrium capped by a stained glass skylight under the tower." The courthouse is undergoing a major renovation project, resulting in the move of many county offices to surrounding buildings.

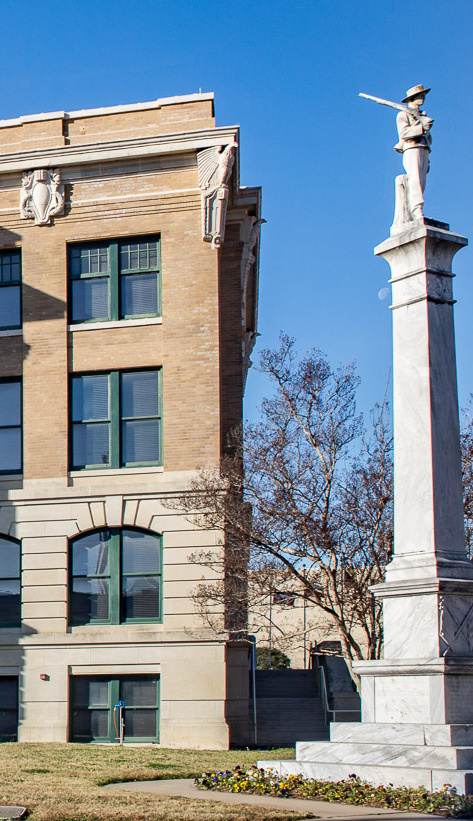
Detail of Confederate monument

In 1911 a monolith topped with a statue of a Confederate soldier was placed on the lawn outside the courthouse. The inscription of the plaque beside it reads "no nation rose so white and fair none fell so pure of crime", in a statement typical of Confederate monuments that minimized the human impact of slavery and romanticized the Lost Cause of the Confederacy. In 2020, County Commissioners voted to retain the courthouse's Confederate monument.

=== Camp Howze, World War II ===
Gainesville was once home to Camp Howze, one of the largest infantry replacement training centers during World War II. Only a few remnants of the camp still exist, but they are now located on private property.

=== Railroad ===
Railroads across Texas changed the nature and reach of commerce when they were built through and into areas. When the first railroad arrived in Gainesville, it improved the city's economics. For the first time, reliable, timely transportation meant goods and people could go vast distances. Gainesville was connected to the outside world in a whole new way with the coming of the railroads. For example, when the GC&SF arrived in 1887, goods could travel directly to or from Gainesville, directly to Chicago and Galveston, on the same railroad. Both were major transportation hubs during that age, and still are today.

Original companies and dates of arrival in Gainesville:

- The Denison and Pacific Railway (1879) (now a part of UP via the MKT) – route: Denison, TX to Gainesville via Whitesboro, TX
- Gainesville, Henrietta and Western Railway (1886) (now a part of UP via the MKT) – route: Gainesville to Wichita Falls, TX
- Gulf Colorado & Santa Fe Railway (1887) (now a part of BNSF) – route: Fort Worth to Oklahoma City

These turned into major railroads:

- Missouri–Kansas–Texas Railroad (MKT) is now the Union Pacific, but the lines owned in Gainesville were abandoned long before the UP bought the MKT in 1988. The MKT through town was abandoned around 1969 after having providing service for 90 years.
- Atchison, Topeka and Santa Fe Railway (ATSF) is now the BNSF Railway.

=== The Great Hanging ===
In October 1862, during the Civil War, Confederate authorities in Cooke County arrested about 150–200 men suspected of Unionist sympathies. A “Citizens’ Court” of local men - lacking legal authority - convicted many of them of treason. Under mob pressure, executions escalated: 41 were hanged in Gainesville and at least two others killed elsewhere, making it the largest mass hanging in U.S. history.

Afterward, Confederate leaders shut down the court, and thousands fled North Texas. A 1964 state marker defended the executions, but later memorials - including a 2014 granite monument near the site - commemorate the victims. The event remains a controversial chapter in Gainesville’s history.

== Demographics ==
Historical population
Census	Pop.	Note	%±
1880	2,667		—
1890	6,594		147.2%
1900	7,874		19.4%
1910	7,624		−3.2%
1920	8,648		13.4%
1930	8,915		3.1%
1940	9,651		8.3%
1950	11,246		16.5%
1960	13,083		16.3%
1970	13,830		5.7%
1980	14,081		1.8%
1990	14,256		1.2%
2000	15,538		9.0%
2010	16,002		3.0%
2020	17,394		8.7%
U.S. Decennial Census

=== 2020 census ===
As of the 2020 census, Gainesville had a population of 17,394, with 4,105 families residing in the city. The median age was 33.8 years, with 27.2% of residents under the age of 18 and 15.7% of residents 65 years of age or older. For every 100 females there were 92.8 males, and for every 100 females age 18 and over there were 89.4 males age 18 and over.

As of the 2020 census, 94.9% of residents lived in urban areas, while 5.1% lived in rural areas.

As of the 2020 census, there were 6,379 households in Gainesville, of which 34.6% had children under the age of 18 living in them. Of all households, 40.7% were married-couple households, 19.1% were households with a male householder and no spouse or partner present, and 32.4% were households with a female householder and no spouse or partner present. About 30.0% of all households were made up of individuals and 14.0% had someone living alone who was 65 years of age or older.

As of the 2020 census, there were 7,016 housing units, of which 9.1% were vacant. The homeowner vacancy rate was 2.8% and the rental vacancy rate was 8.1%.

Racial composition as of the 2020 census
Race	Number	Percent
White	10,688	61.4%
Black or African American	1,053	6.1%
American Indian and Alaska Native	257	1.5%
Asian	224	1.3%
Native Hawaiian and Other Pacific Islander	12	0.1%
Some other race	2,295	13.2%
Two or more races	2,865	16.5%
Hispanic or Latino (of any race)	5,936	34.1%

=== 2000 census ===
As of the census of 2000, 15,538 people, 5,969 households, and 4,005 families resided in the city. The population density was 914.1 people/sq mi (352.9/km^{2}). The 6,423 housing units averaged 377.9/sq mi (145.9/km^{2}). The racial makeup of the city was 80.77% White, 6.00% African American, 1.33% Native American, 0.55% Asian, 0.02% Pacific Islander, 9.09% from other races, and 2.23% from two or more races. Hispanics or Latinos of any race were 17.47% of the population.

Of the 5,969 households, 33.2% had children under the age of 18 living with them, 49.2% were married couples living together, 13.9% had a female householder with no husband present, and 32.9% were not families; 29.3% of all households were made up of individuals, and 14.7% had someone living alone who was 65 years of age or older. The average household size was 2.52 and the average family size was 3.13.

In the city, the population was distributed as 27.2% under 18, 10.9% from 18 to 24, 25.8% from 25 to 44, 19.3% from 45 to 64, and 16.8% who were 65 or older. The median age was 34 years. For every 100 females, there were 88.0 males. For every 100 females age 18 and over, there were 83.3 males.

The median income for a household in the city was $30,571, and for a family was $37,137. Males had a median income of $30,480 versus $21,459 for females. The per capita income for the city was $15,154. About 17.0% of families and 20.5% of the population were below the poverty line, including 29.5% of those under age 18 and 12.7% of those age 65 or over.

== Education ==
=== Gainesville ISD ===
The city is served by the Gainesville Independent School District, which consists of:

- Gainesville Head Start (toddlers/preschool)
- Thomas A. Edison Elementary (pre-kindergarten (age 4), kindergarten and grade 1)
- W E. Chalmers Elementary (grades 2–4)
- Gainesville Intermediate (grades 5–6)**
- Gainesville Junior High School (grades 7–8)
- Gainesville High School (grades 9-12)

The high school boasts various athletic and academic championships. The GHS varsity basketball team won the 3A-Division I State Championship in 2002, and the varsity football team won the 3A-Division I State Championship in 2003. A notable member of the 2003 championship football team was Darcel McBath, who was recruited by and played for the Texas Tech University Red Raiders and was drafted in the third round of the 2010 NFL draft by the Denver Broncos. Another player who went on to play for the NFL is Kevin Mathis, who played first for the Dallas Cowboys, then for the Atlanta Falcons and New Orleans Saints. The high school has also been historically competitive in University Interscholastic League academic competition, boasting numerous district, regional, and state championships in many categories.

- The campus was officially renamed in 2021 from Robert E. Lee Intermediate School with the name change taking effect as of the 2021–2022 school year.

=== Higher education ===
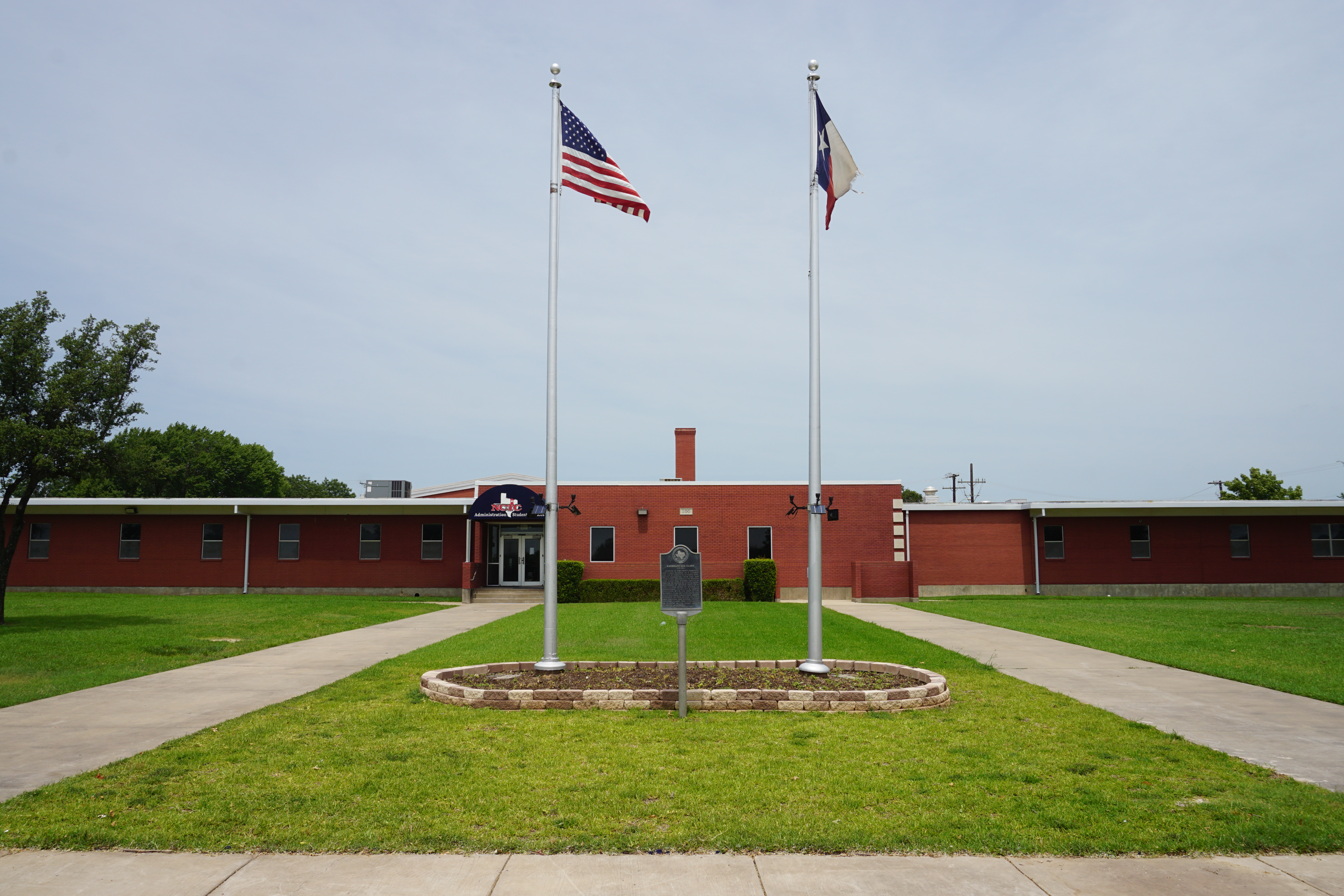
North Central Texas College Administration and Student Services Building

North Central Texas College (NCTC), a five-campus community college system, is headquartered in Gainesville, with the main campus being located on the west side of town.

The college, which the Texas Legislature designates as serving Cooke County, has locations in Gainesville, Bowie, Corinth, Denton, Graham, and Flower Mound. Satellite locations exist at Northwest High School, Little Elm High School, and the Graham Education and Workforce Center. NCTC began as Gainesville Junior College in 1924, and has the distinction of being the oldest continuously operated community college in Texas. NCTC has come to be known for its ever-growing health-sciences program. It offers help such as writing and math labs, which are tutoring centers for students to get more out of their education. Areas of study include certified nursing assistant, associate degree nursing (LVN), registered nurse, emergency medical technician, and radiology technician programs.

NCTC Lion/Lady Lion Athletics, which consists of baseball, softball, volleyball, and women's tennis, competes as part of the National Junior College Athletic Association. The NCTC Lion baseball team won the 2001 NJCAA National Championship.

== Economy ==
Gainesville is the headquarters of Safran Seats USA LLC ("SSUSA"); a company dedicated to the design and manufacturing of commercial airline seat systems. Originally established as Weber Aircraft, LLC, in 1968, the company was subsequently acquired by Group Zodiac Aerospace and became known as Zodiac Seats U.S. In 2018, Zodiac Aerospace and its subsidiaries (including Zodiac Seats U.S.) were purchased by Safran, a French multinational aircraft engine, rocket engine, aerospace-component, and defense company with headquarters in Paris, France. Since its inception, SSUSA has consistently ranked as one of the largest manufacturers of commercial airline seats in the world, as well as the holder of several notable patents for products created by its employees. With around 1,500 employees (as of 2019), SSUSA is the largest single employer located within Gainesville/Cooke County. In addition to the main headquarters facility in Gainesville, SSUSA also maintains operational facilities located near the Boeing Everett Factory in Everett, Washington; Boeing South Carolina located in North Charleston, South Carolina; and at the Airbus manufacturing site located near Hamburg, Germany.

Though most forms of gambling are not legal in Texas, Gainesville is commonly associated with the pastime due to its close proximity to WinStar World Casino. The casino, located less than 10 miles (16 km) north of Gainesville across the Red River in Thackerville, Oklahoma, has experienced exponential growth over the last decade, and is now considered one of the largest casinos in the world by total area. At over a mile long from end to end, the casino contains four hotel towers, a convention center, and as of September 2023 the Lucas Oil Live venue which host popular musical acts and comedians, as well as an 18-hole golf course. Until the construction of the WinStar World Casino Resort and Hotel, casino visitors typically stayed in Gainesville-area hotels. The convention center and/or the Lucas Oil Live venue will host World Series of Poker tournaments in the coming years.

Gainesville is home to a large outlet mall (the Gainesville Factory Shops) which used to attract visitors from North Texas and southern Oklahoma. Constructed in the mid-1990s as a "destination" shopping mall, it has since become a distressed mall, with very few stores remaining in 2016. In 2018 the Property re-launched as Market Days at Liberty Crossing; a multi-use space which hosts a monthly market and numerous retail shops.

== Geography ==
Gainesville is located slightly east of the center of Cooke County. According to the United States Census Bureau, the city has a total area of 19.0 square miles (49.3 km^{2}), of which 0.04 square miles (0.1 km^{2}), or 0.15%, is covered by water.

The town is located at the interchange of two major thoroughfares: U.S. Route 82 running east–west, passing over Interstate 35 (north–south). It is an exurb of the Dallas-Fort Worth metroplex, 71 miles (114 km) north of the center of Dallas and 65 miles (105 km) north of the center of Fort Worth. It is also a part of the Texoma region. Nearby towns and cities include:

- North: Thackerville, Oklahoma
- South: Valley View
- East: Whitesboro
- West: Lindsay

=== Weather and climate ===
Gainesville usually enjoys sunny weather similar to the rest of Texas, with the exception of a few natural disasters.

On June 18, 2007, thunderstorms moved through Gainesville, resulting in intense flooding. Over 7 inches (180 mm) fell in Gainesville and nearby Sherman. On June 20, around 5:00 am, straight-line winds hit, and Wichita Falls had winds up to 94 mph (151 km/h). Much of the center of the town was flooded and several people died.

Climate data for Gainesville, Texas (1991–2020 normals, extremes 1897–present)
Month	Jan	Feb	Mar	Apr	May	Jun	Jul	Aug	Sep	Oct	Nov	Dec	Year
Record high °F (°C)	91 (33)	95 (35)	100 (38)	103 (39)	102 (39)	111 (44)	113 (45)	114 (46)	112 (44)	104 (40)	91 (33)	89 (32)	114 (46)
Mean maximum °F (°C)	73.5 (23.1)	78.5 (25.8)	84.7 (29.3)	87.1 (30.6)	91.8 (33.2)	96.7 (35.9)	102.4 (39.1)	103.2 (39.6)	98.0 (36.7)	91.0 (32.8)	81.2 (27.3)	73.9 (23.3)	104.8 (40.4)
Mean daily maximum °F (°C)	52.6 (11.4)	57.6 (14.2)	65.5 (18.6)	73.5 (23.1)	80.0 (26.7)	88.5 (31.4)	93.5 (34.2)	94.3 (34.6)	86.6 (30.3)	76.0 (24.4)	63.5 (17.5)	54.5 (12.5)	73.8 (23.2)
Daily mean °F (°C)	42.2 (5.7)	46.5 (8.1)	54.2 (12.3)	62.2 (16.8)	70.0 (21.1)	78.6 (25.9)	83.1 (28.4)	83.3 (28.5)	75.9 (24.4)	64.9 (18.3)	53.1 (11.7)	44.3 (6.8)	63.2 (17.3)
Mean daily minimum °F (°C)	31.7 (−0.2)	35.4 (1.9)	42.8 (6.0)	50.8 (10.4)	60.1 (15.6)	68.7 (20.4)	72.8 (22.7)	72.3 (22.4)	65.1 (18.4)	53.9 (12.2)	42.7 (5.9)	34.2 (1.2)	52.5 (11.4)
Mean minimum °F (°C)	16.1 (−8.8)	20.3 (−6.5)	25.8 (−3.4)	36. (2)	46.3 (7.9)	60.4 (15.8)	66.3 (19.1)	64.8 (18.2)	52.2 (11.2)	38.1 (3.4)	27.0 (−2.8)	19.3 (−7.1)	12.3 (−10.9)
Record low °F (°C)	−5 (−21)	−6 (−21)	7 (−14)	26 (−3)	32 (0)	40 (4)	51 (11)	50 (10)	34 (1)	22 (−6)	13 (−11)	−7 (−22)	−7 (−22)
Average precipitation inches (mm)	2.21 (56)	2.56 (65)	3.65 (93)	3.92 (100)	5.64 (143)	4.64 (118)	2.91 (74)	2.83 (72)	3.90 (99)	4.36 (111)	3.02 (77)	3.11 (79)	42.75 (1,086)
Average snowfall inches (cm)	1.3 (3.3)	0.3 (0.76)	0.6 (1.5)	0.0 (0.0)	0.0 (0.0)	0.0 (0.0)	0.0 (0.0)	0.0 (0.0)	0.0 (0.0)	0.0 (0.0)	0.1 (0.25)	0.3 (0.76)	2.6 (6.6)
Average precipitation days (≥ 0.01 in)	5.0	5.1	6.6	6.2	8.8	6.4	5.2	5.2	5.7	5.9	5.2	5.0	70.3
Average snowy days (≥ 0.1 in)	0.4	0.2	0.1	0.0	0.0	0.0	0.0	0.0	0.0	0.0	0.1	0.2	1.0
Source: NOAA

== Government and infrastructure ==
The Texas Youth Commission operates the Gainesville State School in an unincorporated area east of Gainesville.

== Public library ==
The public library for Cooke County, Cooke County Library, was first established in 1903; the library is in Gainesville.

== Parks, recreation, and tourism ==
Gainesville has a zoo, a historic train station, and a 45-acre (180,000 m^{2}) fully integrated soccer complex. It has miniature one-quarter-sized replica steam engine passenger train, which was disassembled from its former location and then reassembled in Leonard Park for viable transportation for up to 50 passengers for tours around the Park. Leonard Parks' wooden playground was expanded in 1999 and is located near the entrance to the Frank Buck Zoo. Gainesville hosts year-round adult softball for both men's league and co-ed league, a couple of seasons of sand volleyball, and a season of indoor basketball.

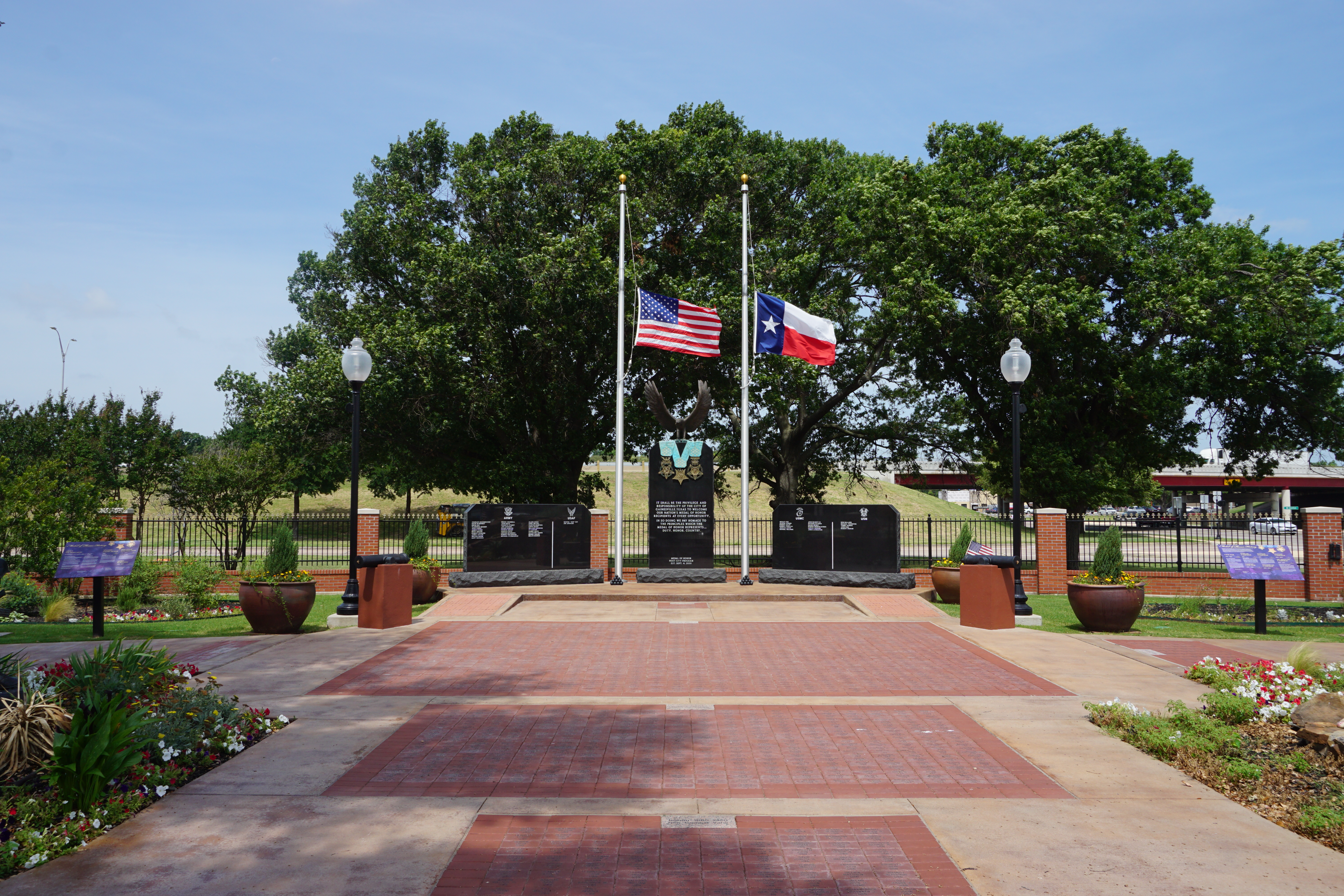
Medal of Honor Park

City parks include:

- BP Douglas Park
- Edison Park
- Forsythe Transportation Skate Park
- Gainesville Tennis Court Area
- Heritage Dog Park
- Home Grown Hero Walking Trail
- Kiwanis Park
- Keneteso Park
- Leonard Park
- Medal of Honor Park
- Moffett Park
- Pecan Creek Park
- B. P. Douglas Park

=== Annual events ===
- Every April, Gainesville hosts recipients of the Medal of Honor with a formal banquet and citywide parade. The Medal of Honor Host City Program pays for travel, lodging, and other expenses for any Medal of Honor recipient interested in attending. The recipients make appearances at schools and public events to talk about their service to their country.
- Depot Day: In October, Gainesville hosts a train-themed carnival.

== Health system ==
Gainesville is served by a tax-funded public hospital district, which operates North Texas Medical Center, formerly known as Gainesville Memorial Hospital.

== Media ==
=== Newspapers ===
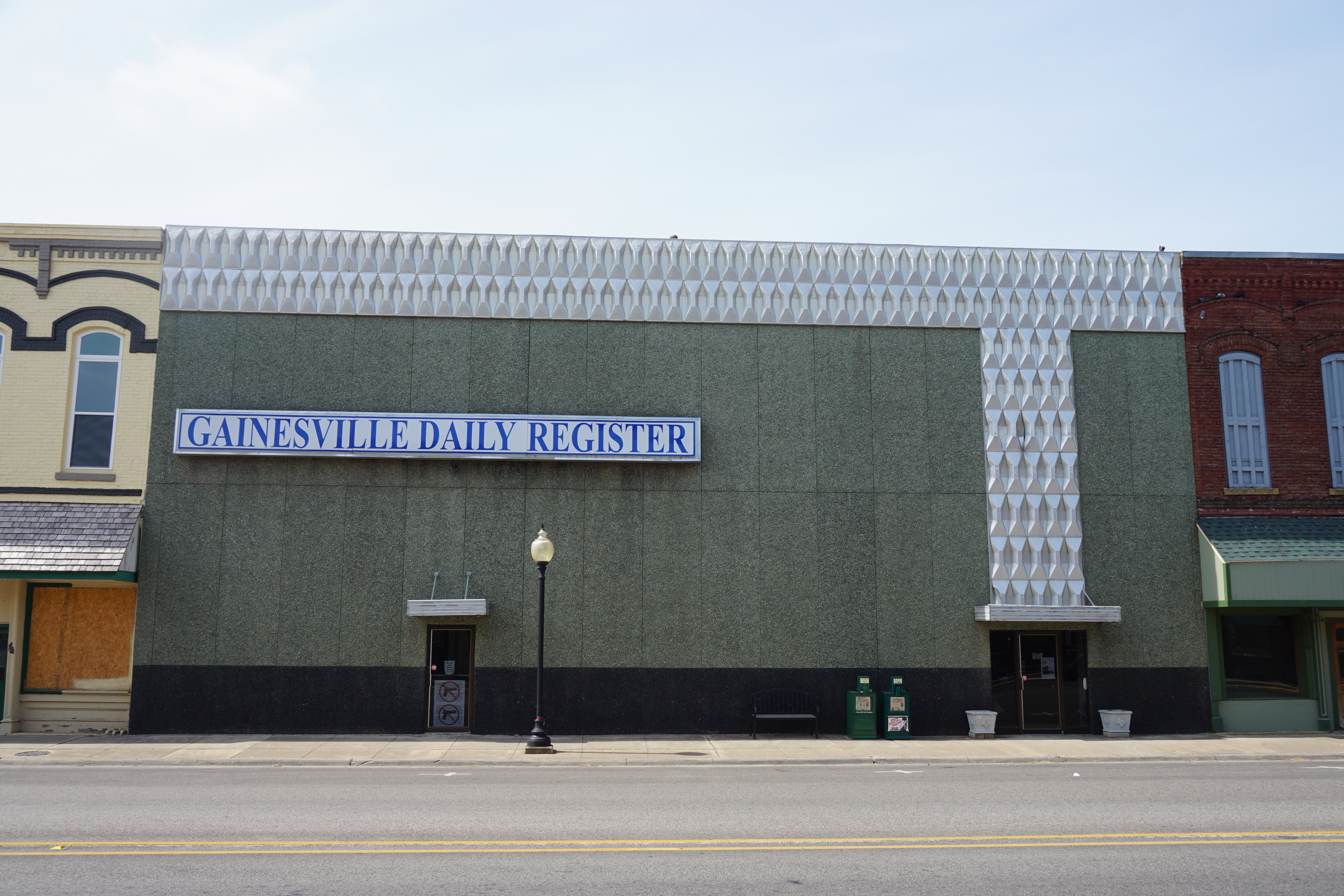
Gainesville Daily Register building

- Gainesville Daily Register
- Weekly News of Cooke County

=== Radio ===
- KGAF – 1580 AM & FM 92.3
- KPFC – 91.9 FM (Camp Sweeney)
- KFZN – 94.5 FM (Dallas–Fort Worth Metroplex)

=== Television ===
- Gainesville gets over-the-air reception from Sherman-Ada, which also includes an OETA translator from Ardmore, Oklahoma. Amplified outdoor antennas can receive stations from DFW.

== Transportation ==
=== Rail ===
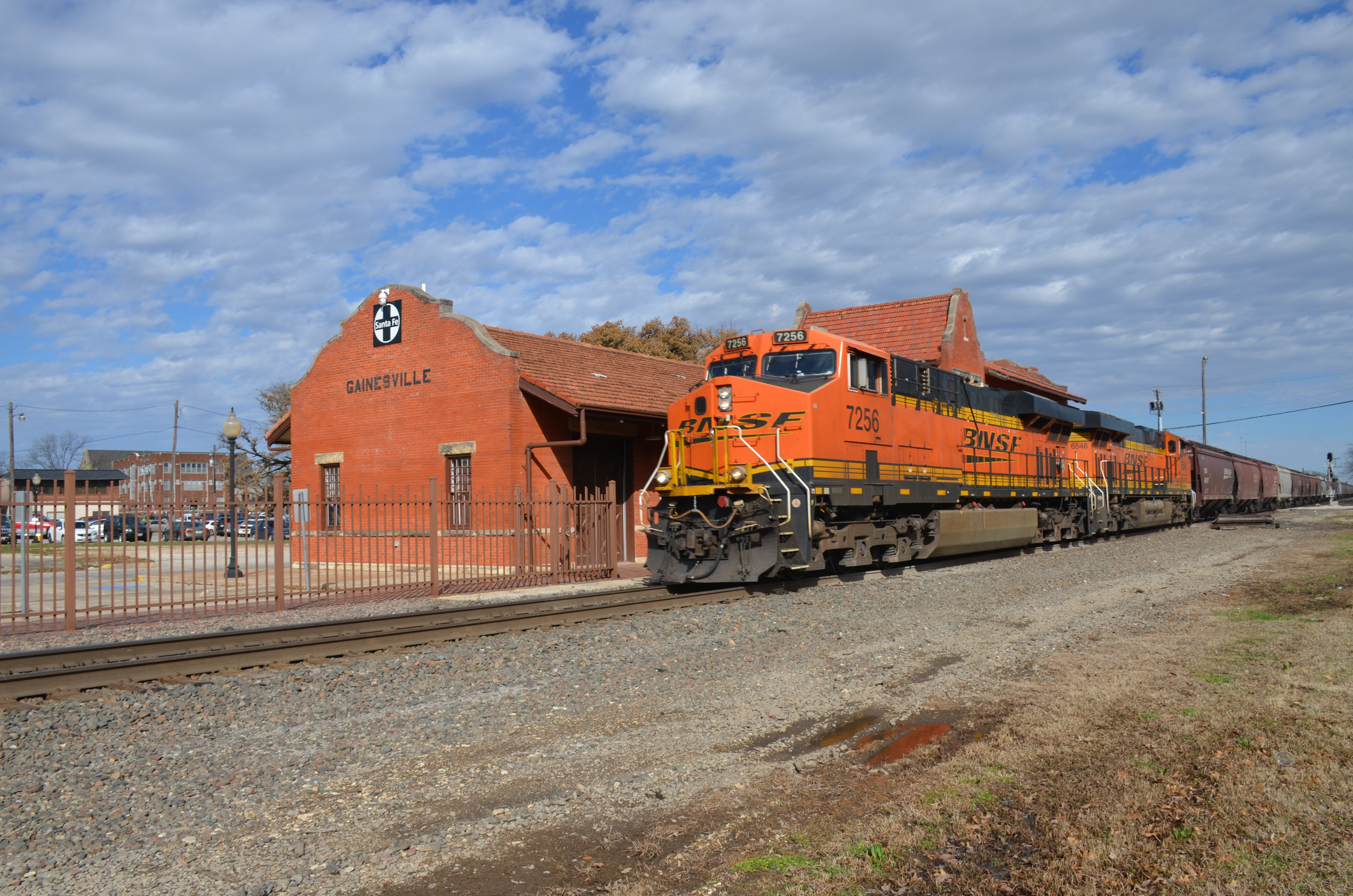
Santa Fe depot

Gainesville has a historic rail depot. It is served by Amtrak's Heartland Flyer, which operates daily in both directions between Oklahoma City and Fort Worth.

=== Airport ===
Gainesville is served by the Gainesville Municipal Airport, a publicly owned and supported airport that was established following the transfer of the Camp Howze Army Airfield to the City of Gainesville. This followed the closing of Camp Howze in the mid- to late 1940s. The airport serves all types of general aviation aircraft, and is the host site for the Texas Antique Airplane Association's annual fly-in.

=== Roads and highways ===
Major highways are:

- U.S. Route 82
- Interstate 35

Parts of Interstate 35 through Gainesville do not contain any frontage roads. Frontage roads approaching the U.S. 82 overpass were not added until 2012. During this time, the overpass was expanded to make room for U-turn lanes.

== Notable people ==
- Lew Allen, U.S. Air Force four-star general; former Chief of Staff of the U.S. Air Force
- Gene Austin, singer/songwriter, was born in Gainesville
- Norfleet Giddings Bone, landscape architect and civil engineer, born in Gainesville
- Rod Brown, football player; Oklahoma State University
- Frank Buck, American hunter, animal collector, and author
- Alex Cord, actor and horse rancher in Cooke County
- Robert Fuller, actor and horse rancher in Cooke County
- Glen Monroe Henry, circus performer
- Kevin Mathis, former NFL cornerback for the Dallas Cowboys
- Darcel McBath, NFL safety, formerly of the Denver Broncos
- Charley Paddock, Olympic sprinter; won gold in 1920
- Jim Rayburn, founder of nondenominational Christian youth organization Young Life
- Aurelian Smith, Jr., known as Jake "The Snake" Roberts, professional wrestler
- Russel "Red" Stegall, singer/songwriter, was born in Gainesville

== Photo gallery ==
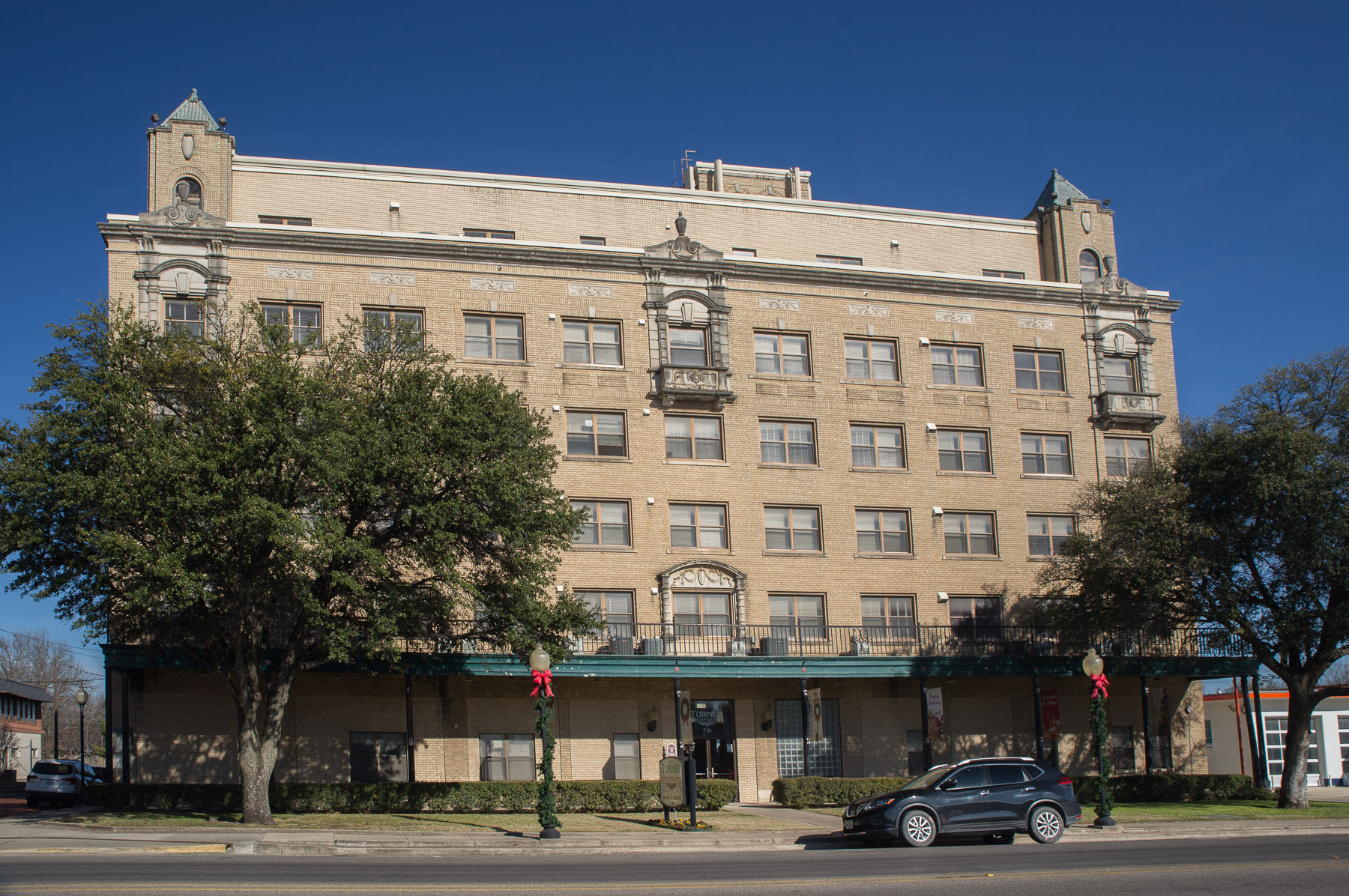
Turner Hotel (Apartments)

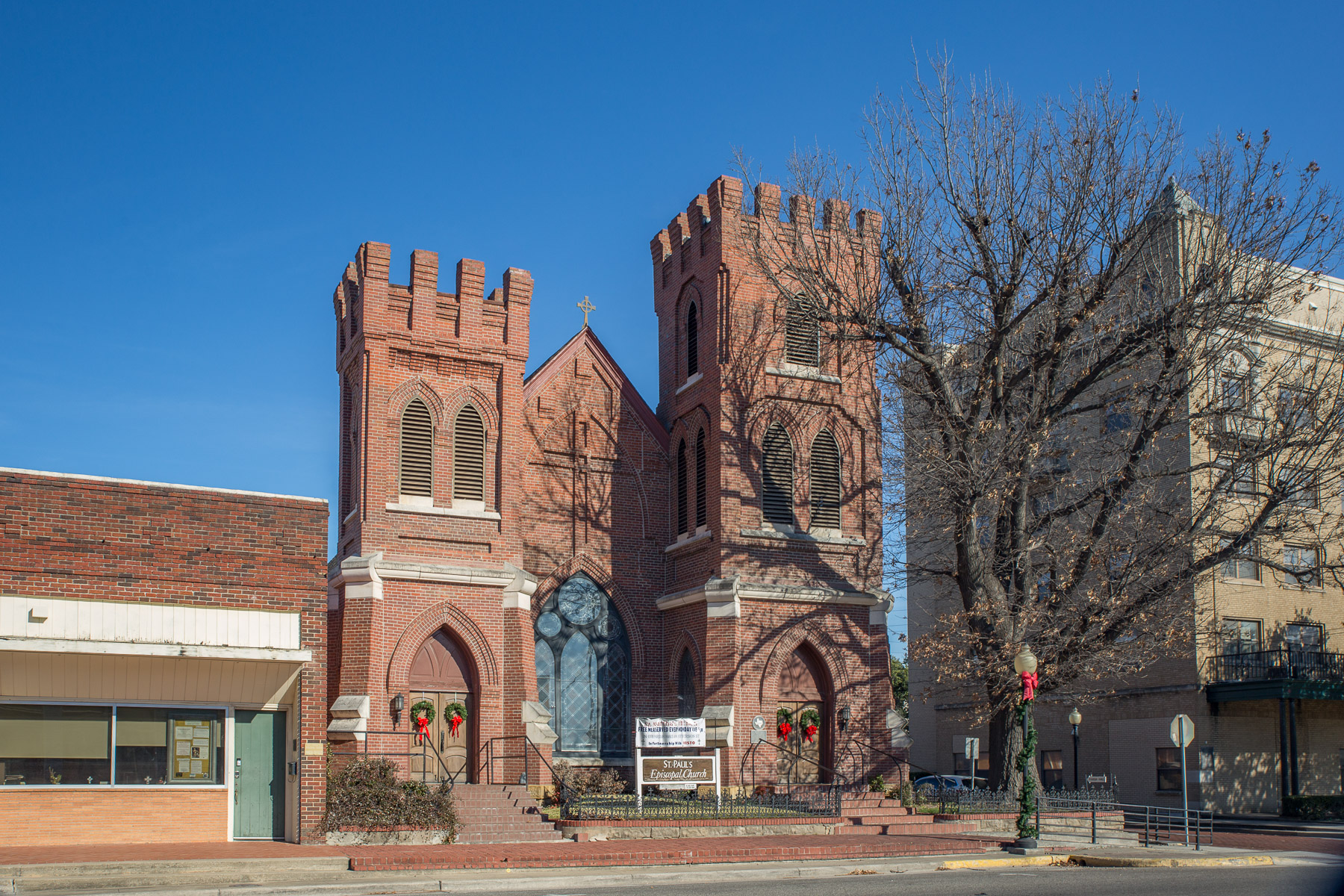
St. Paul's Episcopal Church

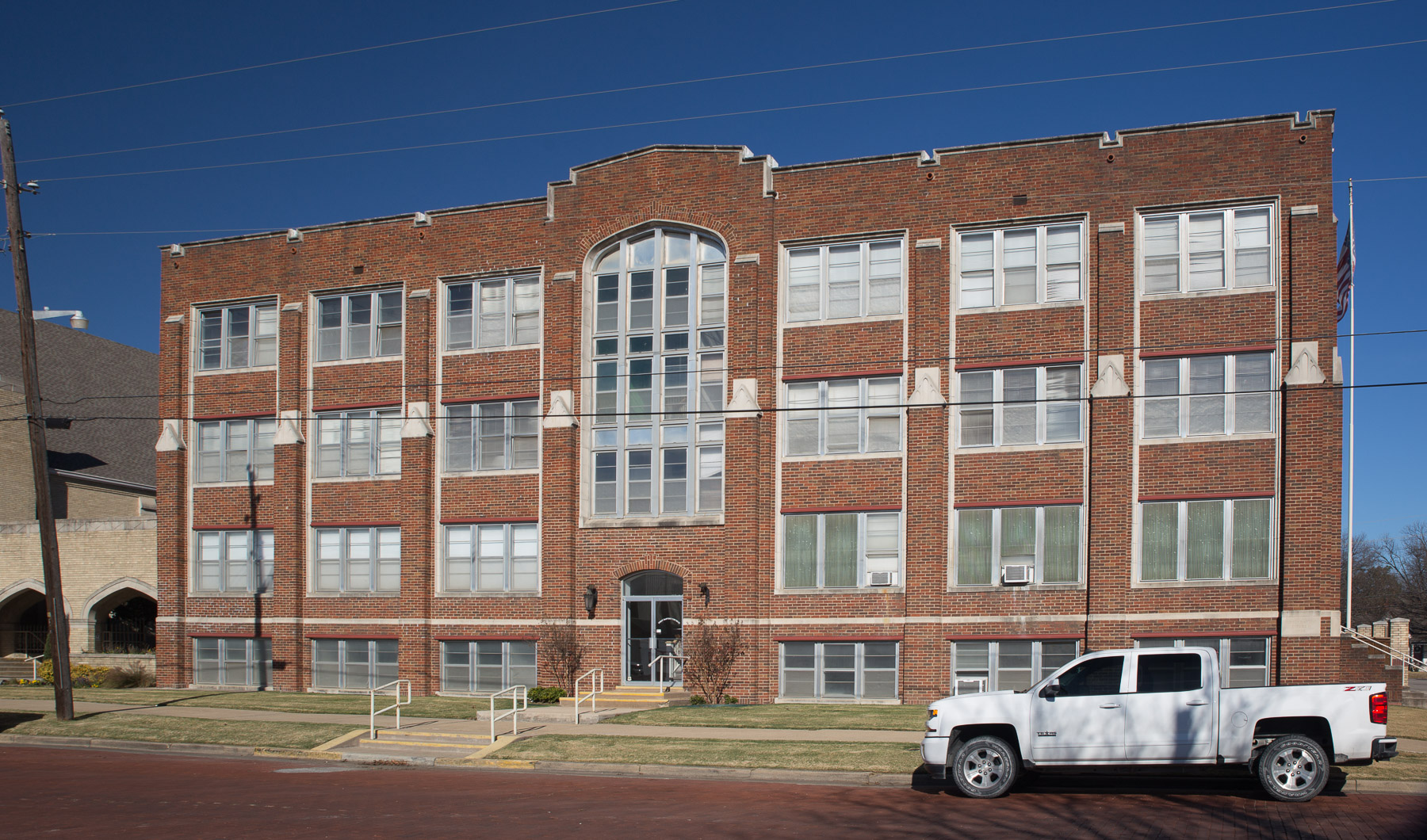
First Baptist Church Building

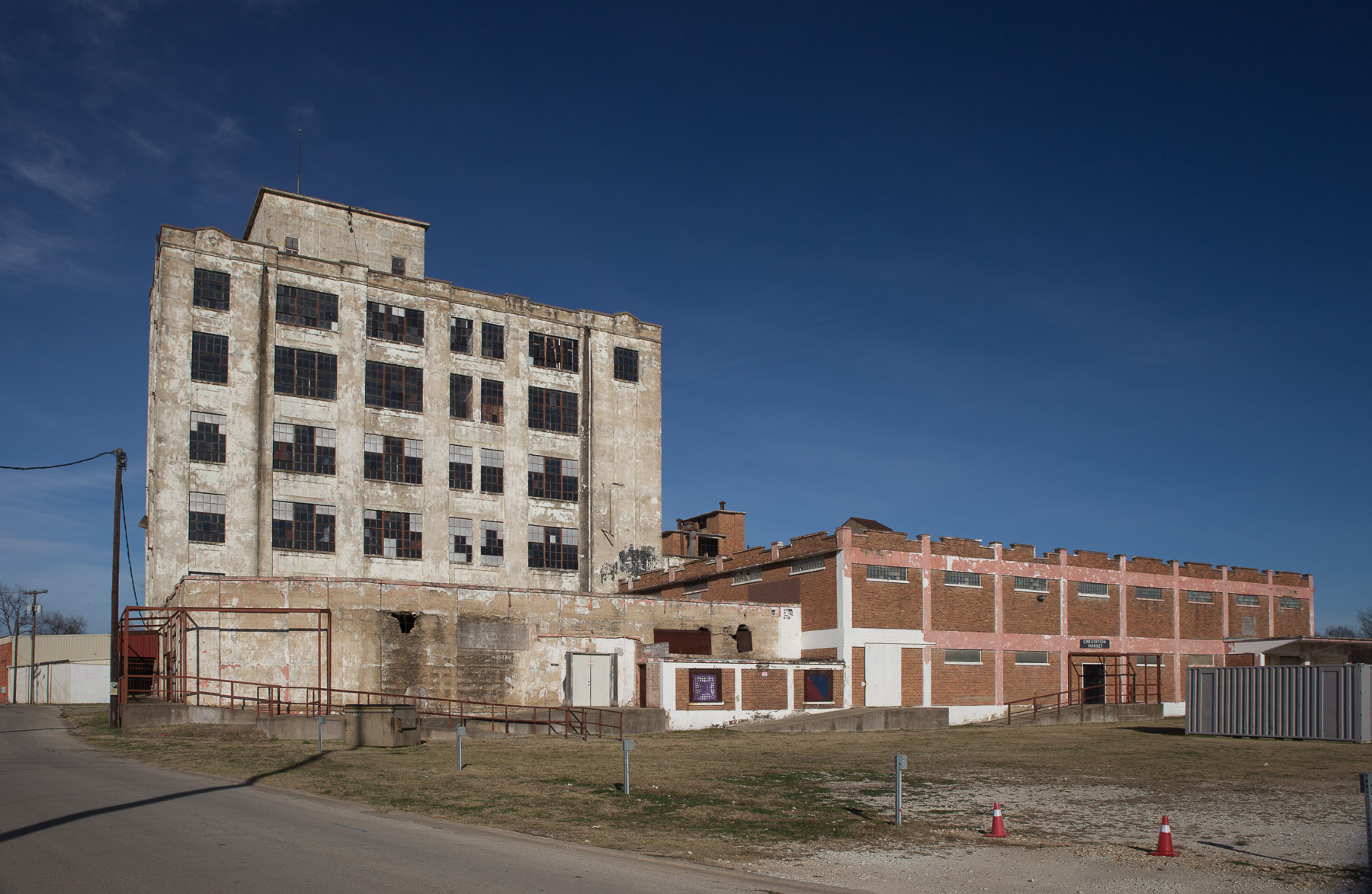
Old Flour Mill Building

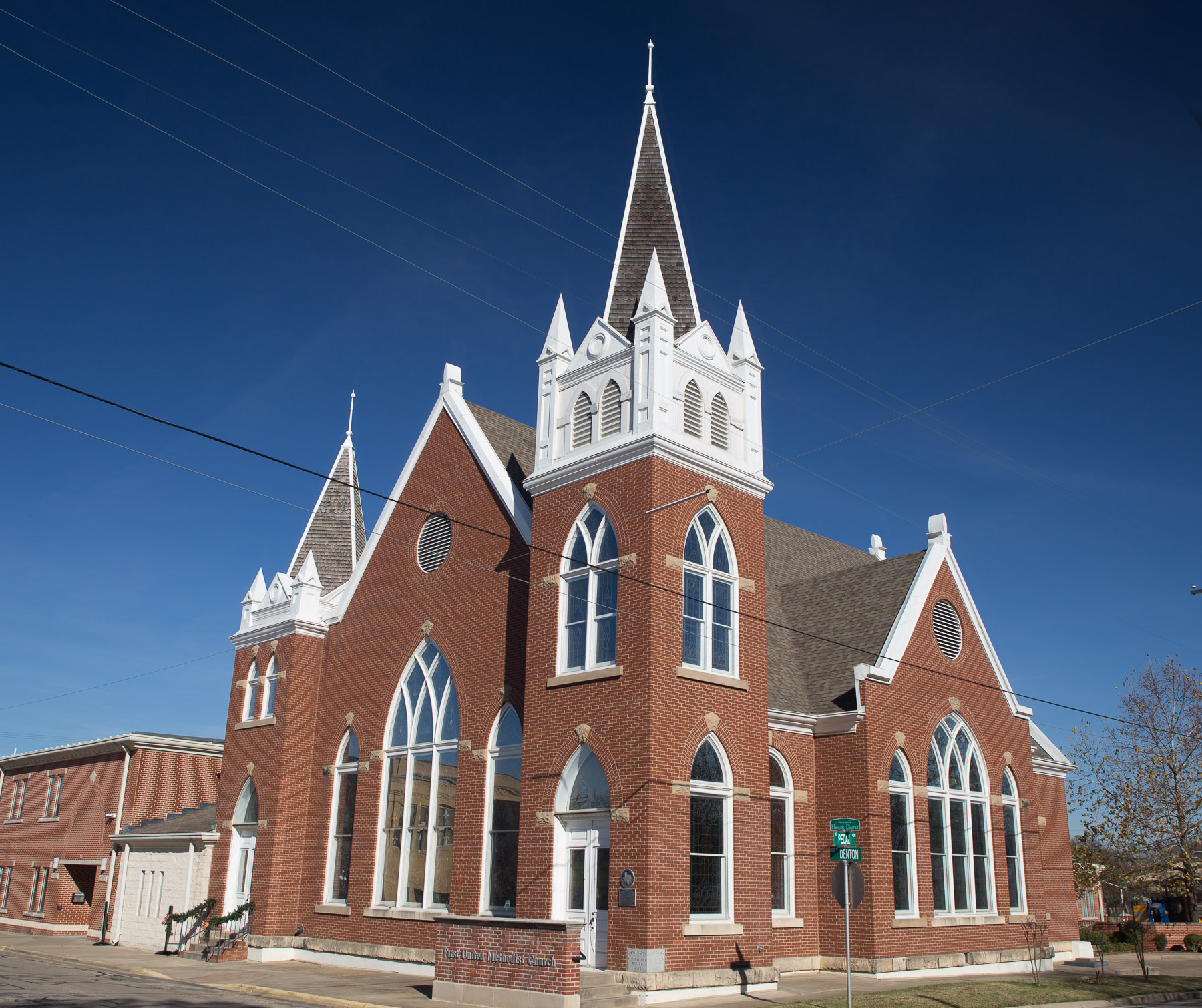
First United Methodist Church

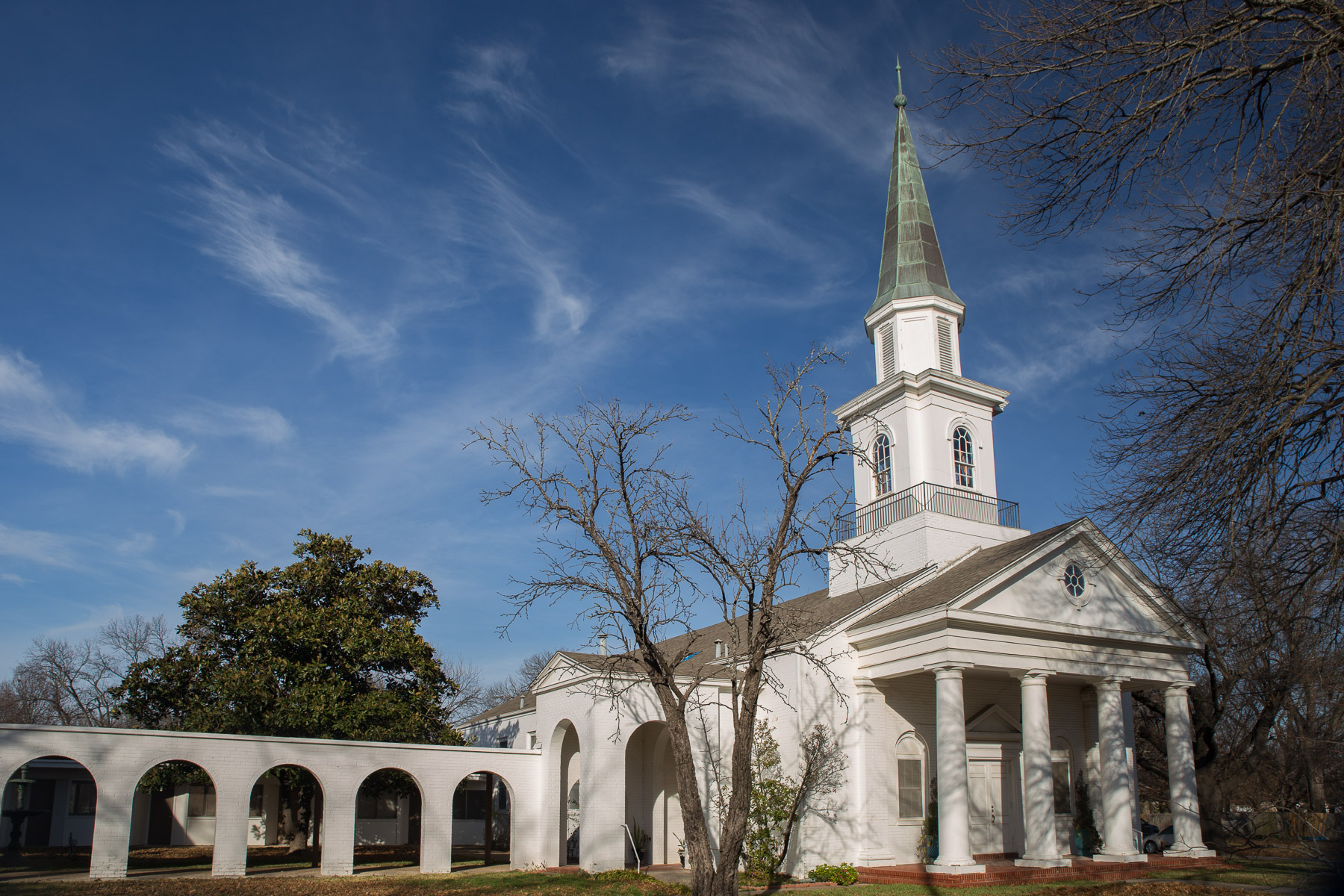
Westminster Presbyterian Church

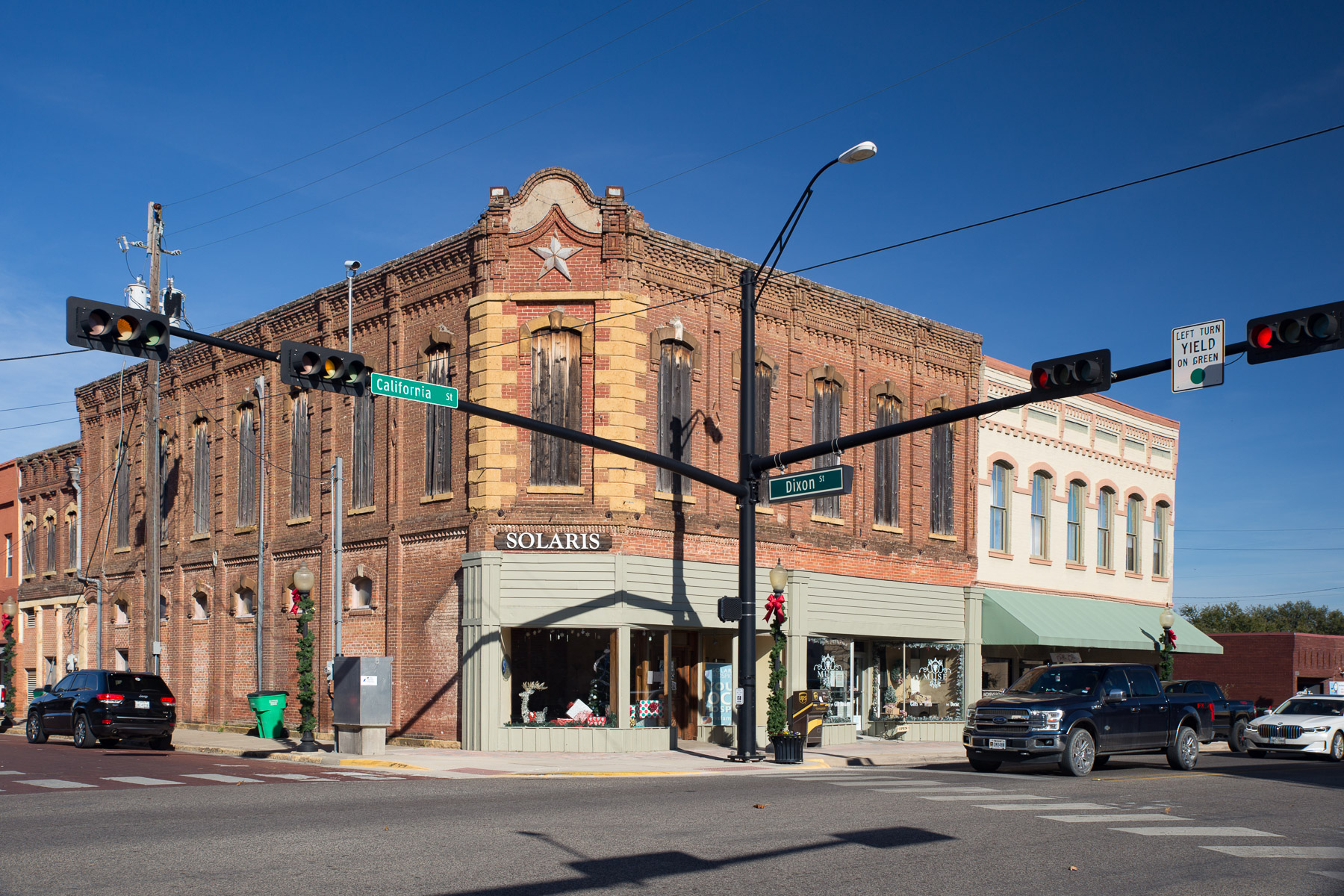
Downtown Gainesville

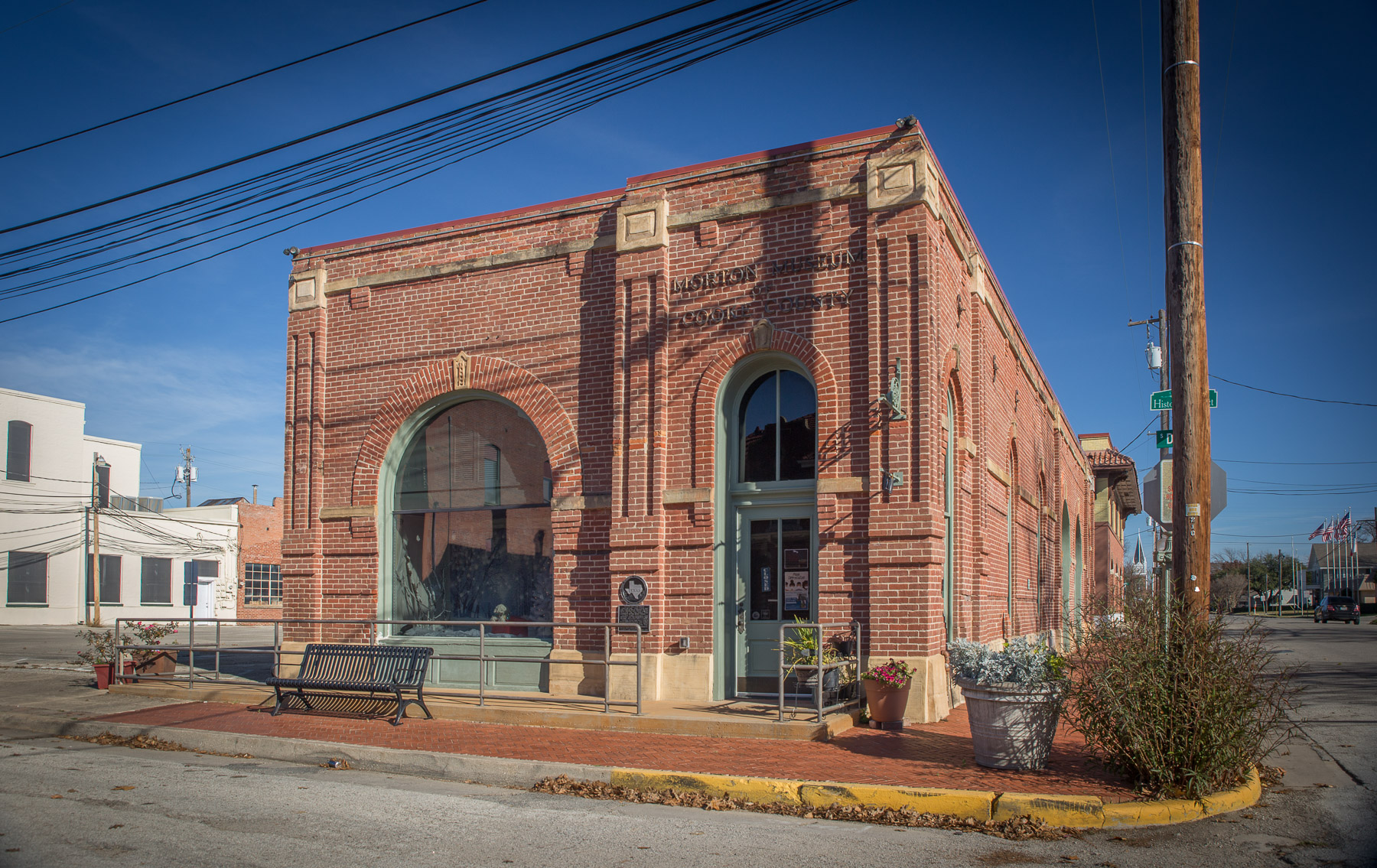
Old Fire Station

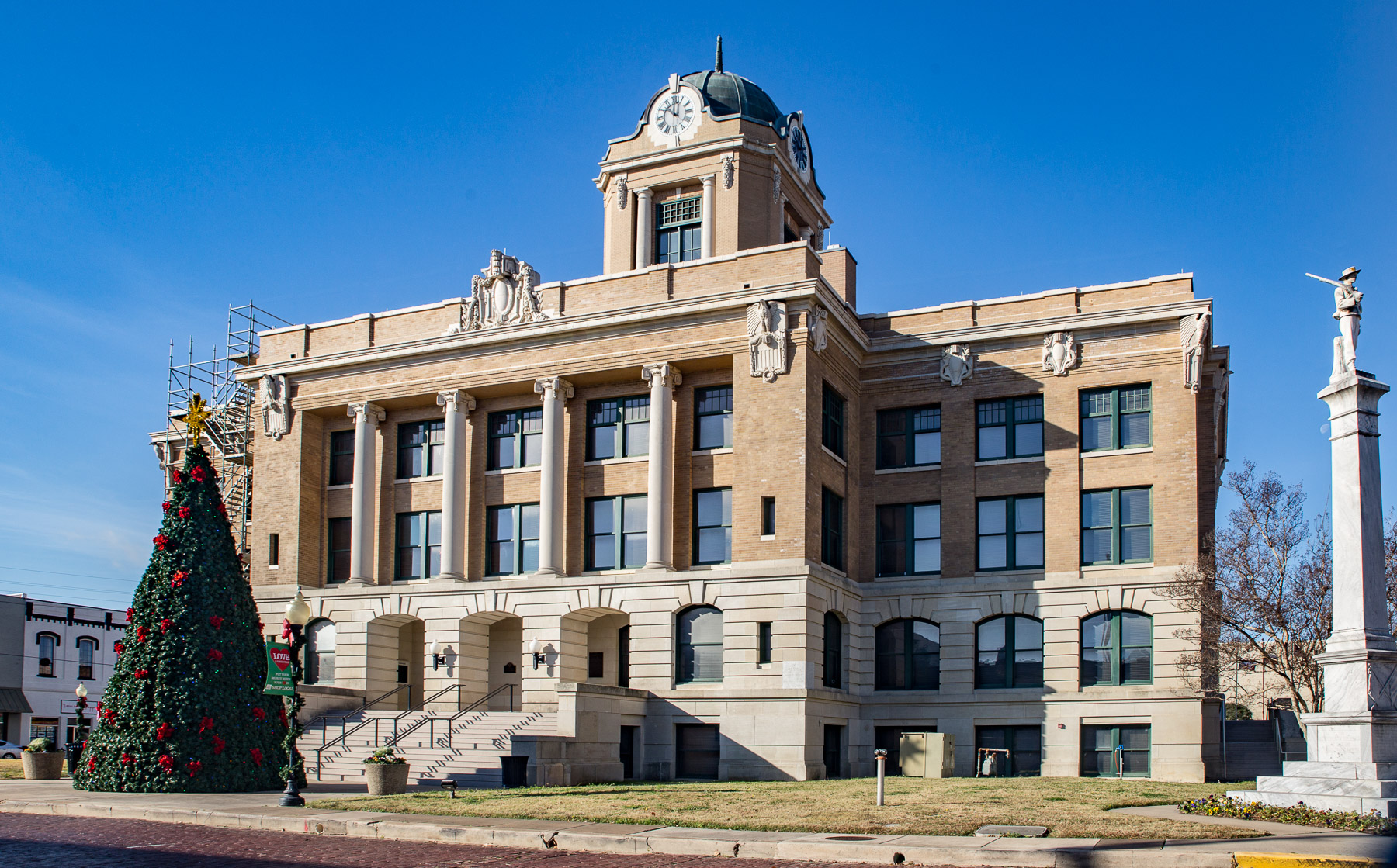
Cooke County Courthouse

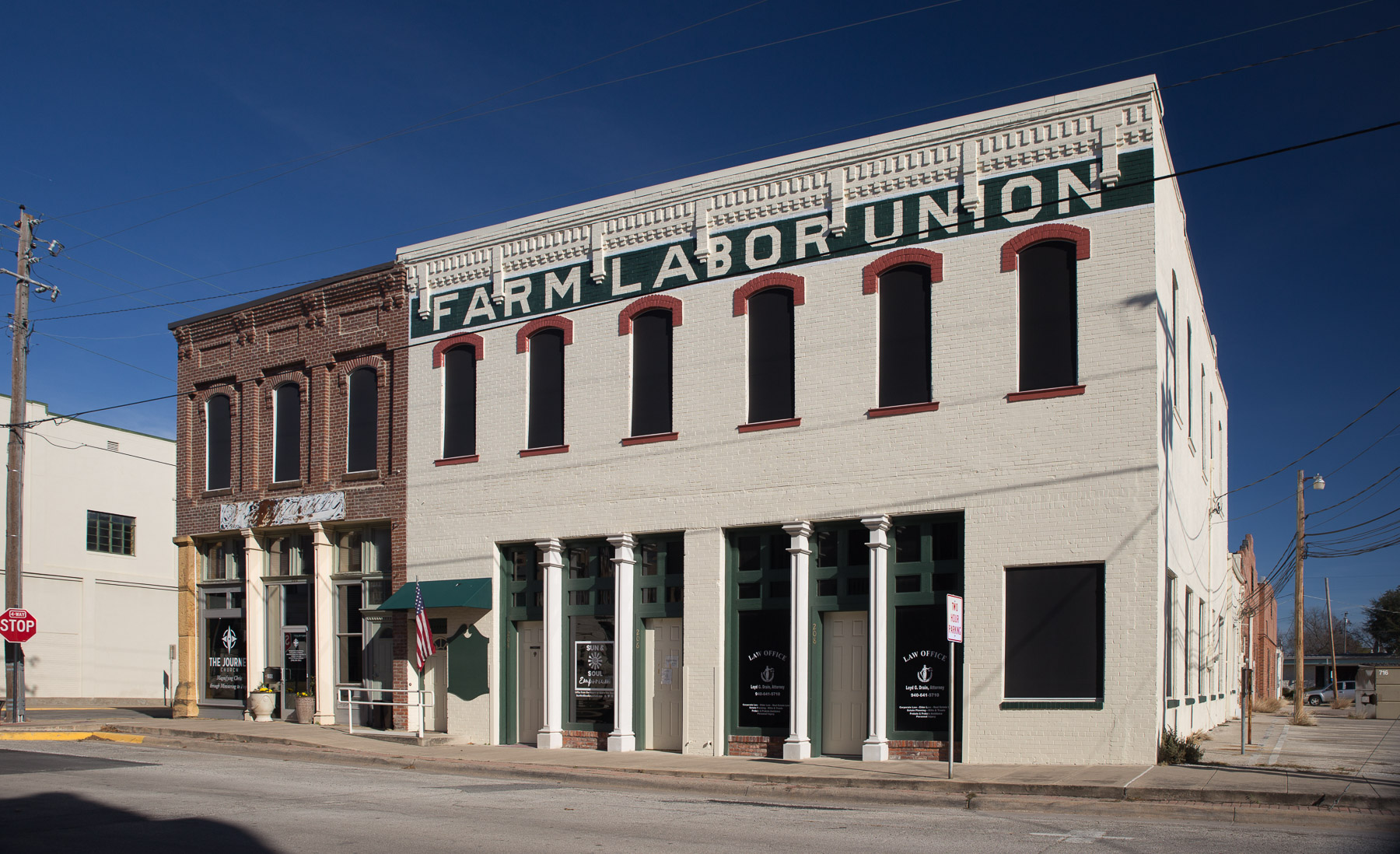
Downtown Gainesville

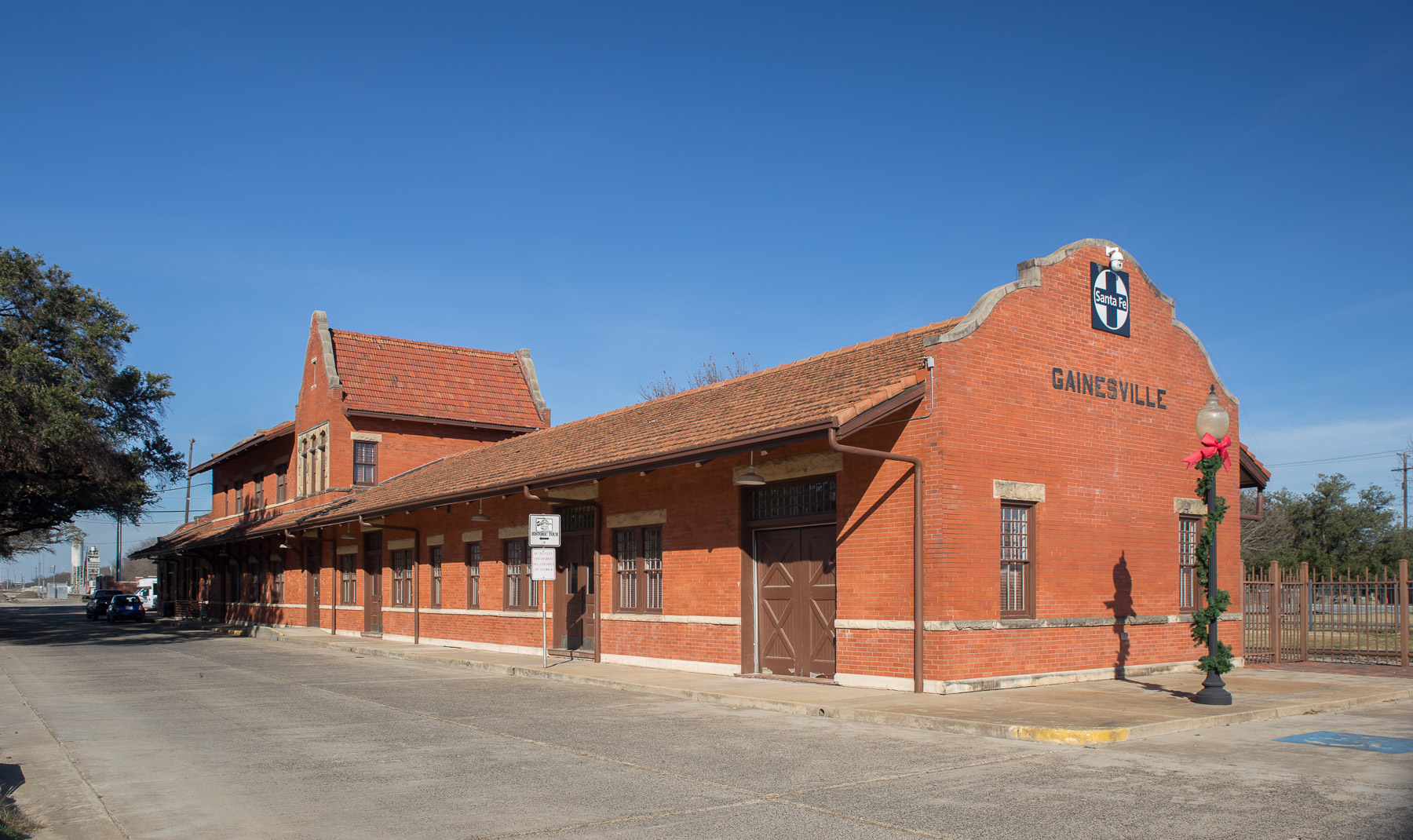
Santa Fe Depot

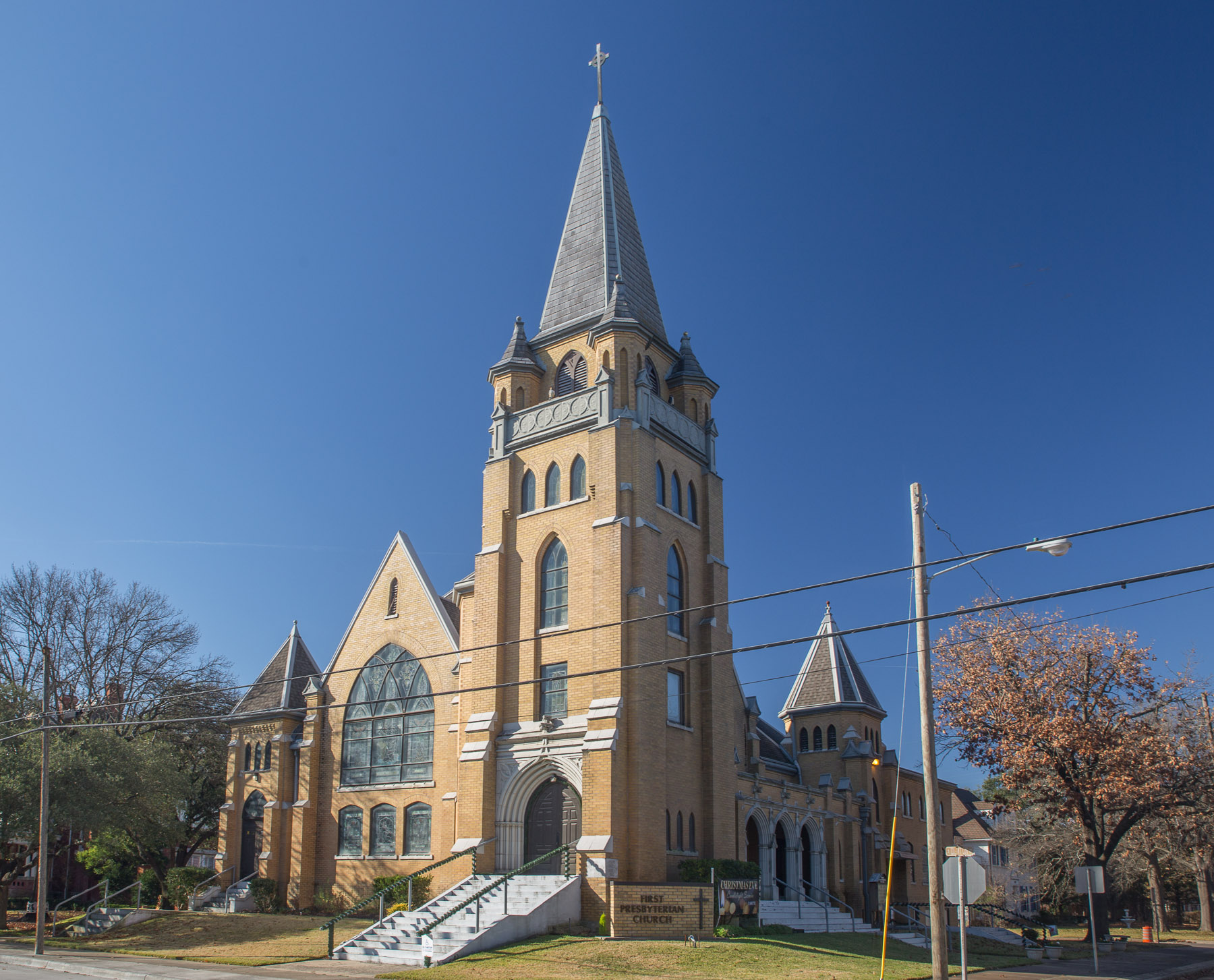
First Presbyterian Church
