= KGAF =

Radio station in Gainesville, Texas

- Gainesville, Texas; United States
- Broadcast area: Cooke County
- Frequency: 1580 kHz
- Branding: Hometown Radio

Programming
- Format: Gold-based Adult Contemporary
- Affiliations: Texas State Network (TSN)

Ownership
- Owner: First IV Media, Inc.

History
- First air date: 1947

Technical information
- Licensing authority: FCC
- Facility ID: 21600
- Class: B
- Power: 1,200 watts daytime 280 watts night
- Transmitter coordinates: 33°37′43″N 97°6′26″W
- Translators: K222DD (92.3 MHz, Gainesville)

Links
- Public license information: Public file; LMS
- Website: kgaf.net

KGAF (1580 kHz) is a commercial AM radio station broadcasting a gold-based adult contemporary radio format. Licensed to Gainesville, Texas, the station serves Cooke County. The station is owned by First IV Media, Inc. and operated by Eberhart Broadcasting.

KGAF transmits with 1,200 watts by day and 280 watts at night, using a non-directional antenna. Programming is also heard on 250-watt FM translator K222DD on 92.3 MHz.

== Station Info ==
KGAF is an Adult Contemporary formatted radio station in Gainesville in Cooke County Texas. KGAF features Steve Eberhart in the morning with newsperson Melanie Brown. Middays are anchored by Janice Williams, and Johnny afternoons. KGAF cover local in season sports, including Football, Basketball and Baseball playoffs. Network news from ABC News and Texas State Network News is featured each hour.
