= KPFC (FM) =

- Callisburg, Texas; United States
- Broadcast area: Gainesville, Texas
- Frequency: 91.9 MHz

Programming
- Format: Variety

Ownership
- Owner: Camp Sweeney

Technical information
- Licensing authority: FCC
- Facility ID: 89080
- Class: A
- ERP: 300 watts
- HAAT: 20.0 meters
- Transmitter coordinates: 33°40′11.00″N 97°0′50.00″W
- Translator: (89.1 MHz) K206CD (Gainesville)

Links
- Public license information: Public file; LMS
- Webcast: listen live
- Website: kpfc.org

KPFC (91.9 FM) is a radio station broadcasting a Variety format. Licensed to Callisburg, Texas, United States, the station serves the Cooke County area. The station is currently owned by Camp Sweeney. KPFC also has a translator transmitter (K206CD) on 89.1. 91.9 and 89.1 serve Cooke County and the surrounding areas with an eclectic mix of music and programming. The program director is Suede Wanamaker. During sessions at Camp Sweeney, campers are allowed to go on air with Chad and do their own segments during the first 2 periods in the morning.
