= Dallas Cotton Exchange Building =

Coordinates: 32.7854°N 96.7997°W

Dallas Cotton Exchange
- Interactive map of the Dallas Cotton Exchange area

General information
- Status: Demolished
- Type: Office
- Location: 608 N. St. Paul Street, Dallas, Texas, United States
- Opening: 1926
- Demolished: June 25, 1994

Height
- Roof: 200 ft (61 m)

Technical details
- Floor count: 17

Design and construction
- Architects: Lang & Witchell

The Dallas Cotton Exchange Building was a 17-story tan brick and concrete building on the corner of North St. Paul and San Jacinto Streets in downtown Dallas, Texas. It was built in 1926 and was for decades Dallas' second-tallest, as the city was growing into the largest inland cotton market in the U.S. By 1971, though the city had become the financial capital of the cotton industry, the exchange housed more Baptists than brokers because of offices rented to nearby First Baptist Church. By 1987 the building sat vacant.

== Foreclosure and demolition ==
New owner James Louis Williams purchased the Cotton Exchange Building in 1985 and planned to tear it down to build a new 52-story tower in its place. But due to the savings and loan crisis that began in the late 1980s, Williams ended up in bankruptcy court, which in 1991 cut his debt on the structure from $15 million to $9.9 million. Meanwhile, the original lender on the building, First RepublicBank Corp., had failed in 1988, sending the loan to the Federal Deposit Insurance Corp. In 1991, demolition crews were hired to implode the structure.

City inspectors determined that the Cotton Exchange's precast concrete panels, attached during a 1960s renovation, had a high asbestos content and should be removed before implosion. When these were removed, it was discovered that the building's original 1926 exterior was intact and efforts were initiated to save the building from implosion. Then-Mayor Steve Bartlett attempted to persuade Mr. Williams to seek a buyer who would convert the offices to apartments, but the Dallas City Council did not pass enhanced tax abatements for inner-city housing renovations until October 1993, too late to stop the process. On June 25, 1994, the building was destroyed by implosion.

== Legacy ==
- The site was eventually acquired by First Baptist Church, which in 2013 opened a $115 million state-of-the-art campus on land that includes the former Cotton Exchange Building footprint.
- The stone lions, a signature architectural detail of the building, now grace the Maple Avenue entrance of the Stoneleigh Hotel.
