= Glen Monroe Henry =

Glen Henry (né Glen Monroe Henry; 9 September 1912 Oklahoma – 29 December 1983 Gainesville, Texas), was an American circus performer and producer, who, with his family, flourished from the 1936 through the 1970s.

== History ==
Henry and his family were based out of Gainesville, Texas. In the early 1940s, audiences knew Glen Henry and the Aerial Baretis and Glen Henry's Amazon Babies, both affiliated with Arthur's Mighty American Shows. Glen Henry was known in the late 1940s for his "riding dogs," notably with the C.R. Montgomery Wild Animal Circus.

=== Family performers and circus operators ===
Glen Henry was a third generation performer. His father, James Edward Henry (1869–1943), performed in minstrel shows when he was younger. Glen Henry and his wife, Ethel, were known in the 1950s for acts with the Gil Gray Circus, owned and operated by Guy Gilbert Gray (1904–1989). In the 1970s, Glen Henry's family were featured in acts involving dogs and ponies with the Dixie Bros. Circus, owned by Bob Lewis, and based out of New Orleans.

== Family ==
Glen Henry was married to Ethel (née Ethel Marie Haacke; 1915–2013).

Glen and Ethel Henry had two daughters, Patricia King (née Patricia Mae Henry; 1936–2014) and Shirley Atayde (née Shirley Henry; born 1935), and two sons, James Edward Henry (born 1954) and Gary Henry (born 1942).

In 1942, Clifford Henry (1915–1977) was connected with Jimmy Woods Circus and Clark's Greater Shows. Cliff married Mary Pearl Piggott (born 1922) of Vancouver, who became an entertainer under the name Toni Madison, who had an act under the name, "Toni Madison and her Wild West Dogs."
