= U.S. Route 82 in Texas =

Highway in Texas

U.S. Highway 82
- US 82 highlighted in red

Route information
- Maintained by TxDOT
- Length: 504.08 mi (Note: Length does not account for concurrencies along U.S. Highways with lower numbers) (811.24 km)
- Existed: 1935–present

Major junctions
- West end: US 82 at the New Mexico state line near Plains
- US 62 / US 385 in Brownfield; I-27 / US 84 / US 87 in Lubbock; US 83 in Guthrie; I-44 / US 281 / US 287 in Wichita Falls; US 81 in Ringgold; I-35 / US 77 in Gainesville; US 75 in Sherman; US 69 in Bells; I-30 near New Boston; I-369 / US 59 / US 67 / US 71 in Texarkana
- East end: US 82 at the Arkansas state line at Texarkana, AR

Location
- Country: United States
- State: Texas
- Counties: Yoakum, Terry, Hockley, Lubbock, Crosby, Dickens, King, Knox, Baylor, Archer, Wichita, Clay, Montague, Cooke, Grayson, Fannin, Lamar, Red River, Bowie

Highway system
- United States Numbered Highway System; List; Special; Divided; Highways in Texas; Interstate; US; State; Former; Toll; Loops; Spurs; FM/RM; Park; Rec
← SH 81	→ SH 82

In the U.S. state of Texas, U.S. Route 82 (US 82) is a U.S. Highway that runs east from the New Mexico state line through West Texas and Lubbock to the Arkansas state line at Texarkana.

== Route description ==
=== New Mexico to Wichita Falls ===
US 82 crosses into Texas from New Mexico at Texas Farm to Market Road 769, turning northeastward toward Plains, where it merges with US 380. US 82 is co-signed with US 380 from Plains to Brownfield, where it joins US 62, and US 380 leaves the route. US 82/62 continues northeastward toward Lubbock.

In Lubbock, US 82 and US 62 split, where US 82 has been upgraded to a full access freeway, named the Marsha Sharp Freeway, in honor of retired Texas Tech Lady Raiders basketball coach Marsha Sharp. On the east side of the city, US 82 travels as a surface street along Parkway Drive and it once again merges with US 62 (along with State Highway 114) where it continues eastward through Ralls, where US 62 makes a sharp turn to the north and leaves the route. US 82 continues eastward across the level plains of the Llano Estacado to Crosbyton and then dips downward as it crosses the White River of Blanco Canyon, where the Texas Department of Transportation maintains the Silver Falls Rest Area with facilities and hiking trails. After climbing out of Blanco Canyon, US 82 eventually exits the Llano Estacado and enters the rolling plains near Dickens.

US 82/SH 114 continues eastward as a co-signed route until Seymour, where it merges with U.S. Highways 183, 277 and 283, with US 183 and 283 leaving the route at Mabelle. US 82/277 continues eastward to Wichita Falls, merging with I-44 and US 287 just south of downtown at Mile marker 0.

=== Wichita Falls to Arkansas ===
US 82 leaves US 287 at Henrietta and continues east towards the small towns of Nocona (beginning as a four-lane divided highway), St. Jo and Muenster and crossing I-35 in Gainesville at a partial cloverleaf interchange (It has since been converted to a frontage road interchange in 2012.). The highway continues east towards Whitesboro and Sherman where it crosses US Highway 75 at a three-level diamond interchange (the portion through Sherman is called the Buck Owens Freeway in honor of the country music star, who was born in Sherman). Prior to the 1990s, the two highways ran concurrently on the route of SH 56 before being rerouted northeast of Sherman on its present-day route. The highway continues east to Bells where US 82 cross US Route 69.

In Bonham, Texas, US 82 crosses SH 121 while the route runs parallel with SH 56 until Honey Grove where SH 56 ends. US 82 enters Paris at a diamond interchange where it runs concurrent with Loop 286 on the north side of the city as a Business Route runs through the center of the city before rejoining on the east side of Paris. At a diamond interchange on the north side of Paris, US 82/TX Loop 286 meets with US 271 where both highways run concurrent on the northeast side of town before US 82 branches off at another diamond interchange on the east side of Paris. After passing around Clarksville and other smaller towns the highway is crossed by Interstate 30 east of New Boston at a partial cloverleaf and continues to run parallel to IH 30 into Arkansas through downtown Texarkana.

== History ==
US 82 was first designated in Texas in 1939, traveling from Lubbock to Texarkana. The highway was extended from Lubbock to the New Mexico state line in 1963. Between 1974 and 1994, US 82 was re-routed from Whitesboro to Honey Grove; the old routing became SH 56. The highway was re-routed from Allendale Road to US 281/US 287 through Wichita Falls in 1998 with a bypass built around Holliday in 2005. US 82 was re-routed around Clarkesville in 2006, creating a concurrency with SH 37. The highway was re-routed south of Guthrie in 2007, with part of the former route becoming Spur 729.

=== Marsha Sharp Freeway ===
The Marsha Sharp Freeway, named for former Texas Tech Lady Raiders basketball coach Marsha Sharp, was built along US 82 in Lubbock, with construction officially beginning in May 2003, with development going back to the 1980s. In 1998, funding was first received. The five-phase project was scheduled to be completed in 2015.

Phase 2 of the project was scheduled to be completed in December 2008 at a cost of $140 million. It involved construction of the freeway from Salem Avenue to Avenue L and erecting interchanges at 19th Street, Quaker Avenue, Fourth Street, and Avenue Q in Lubbock. Currently construction on the freeway has started from Milwaukee Ave. to Upland Ave. and on the intersection of Spur 327 and U.S. 62/82.

The section of freeway between West Loop 289 and Avenue L was widened from four lanes to six lanes between March 6, 2017 and March 5, 2018, officially marking the end of the freeway's construction.

== Future ==
TxDOT began upgrading U.S. 82 in Grayson and Fannin County in 2013. The four-lane divided highway upgrade between Sherman and Bonham was completed in 2015. TxDOT plans to continue this upgrade to the Fannin and Lamar County line by 2020. Long term planning calls for U.S. 82 to be a four-lane divided highway system the entire length between Wichita Falls and Texarkana as a potential alternate route through north Texas in order to bypass the overcrowded Dallas/Fort Worth Metroplex.

It is being upgraded to a 4 lane divided highway west of Nocona, and a partial bypass is planned to run south of Gainesville.

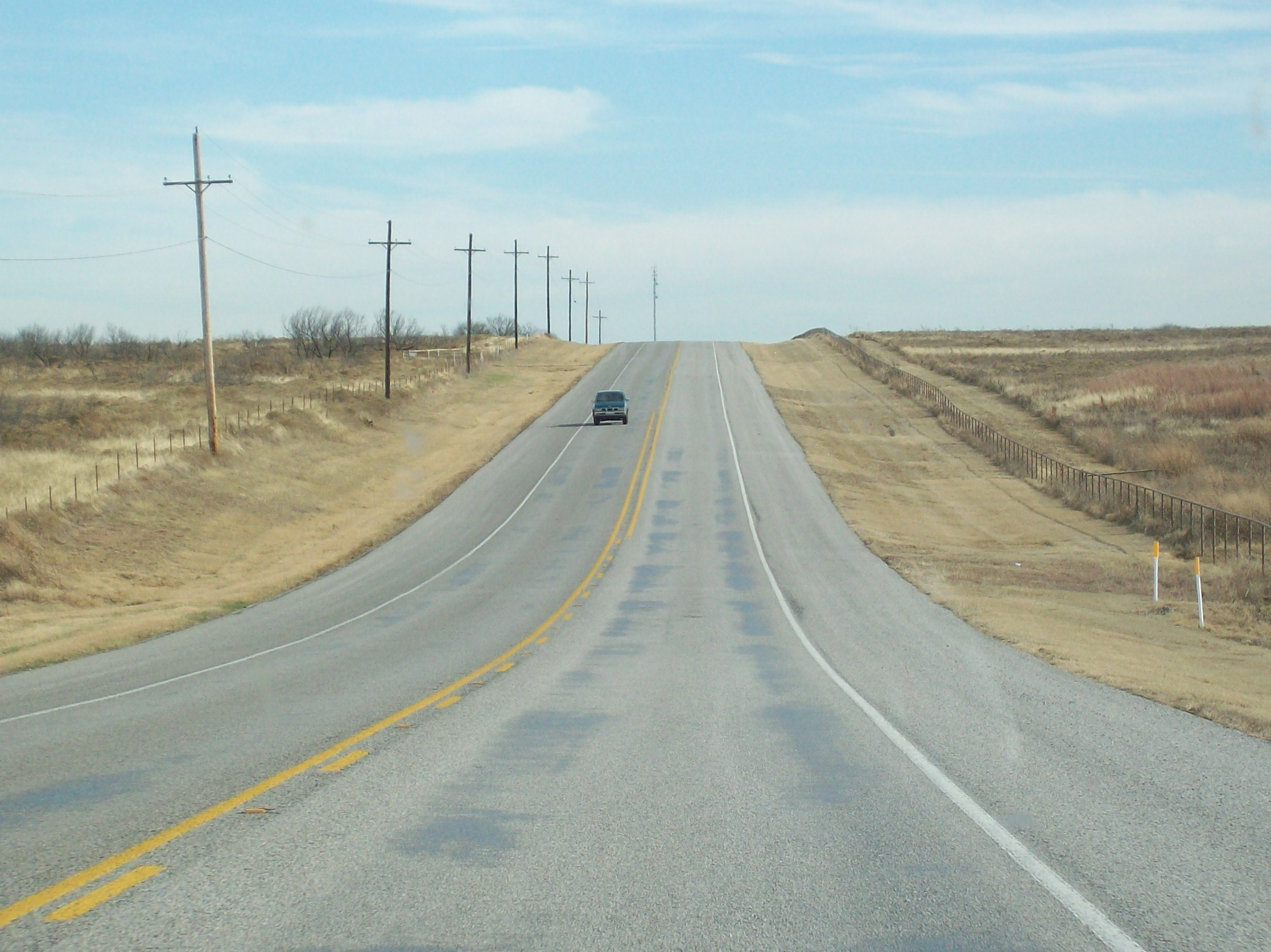
US 82 Outside of Henrietta, TX

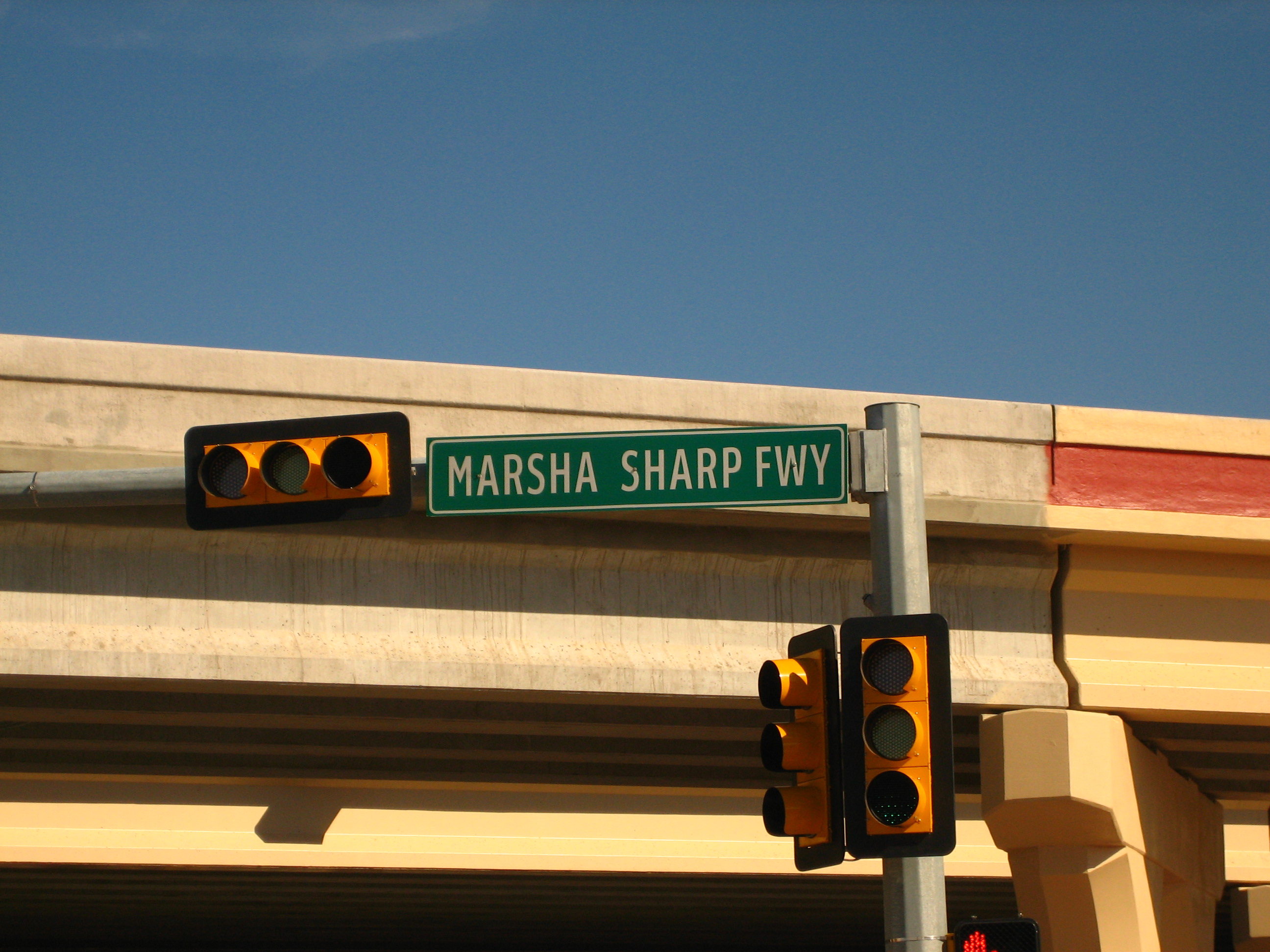
The Marsha Sharp Freeway on U.S. Highway 82 in Lubbock

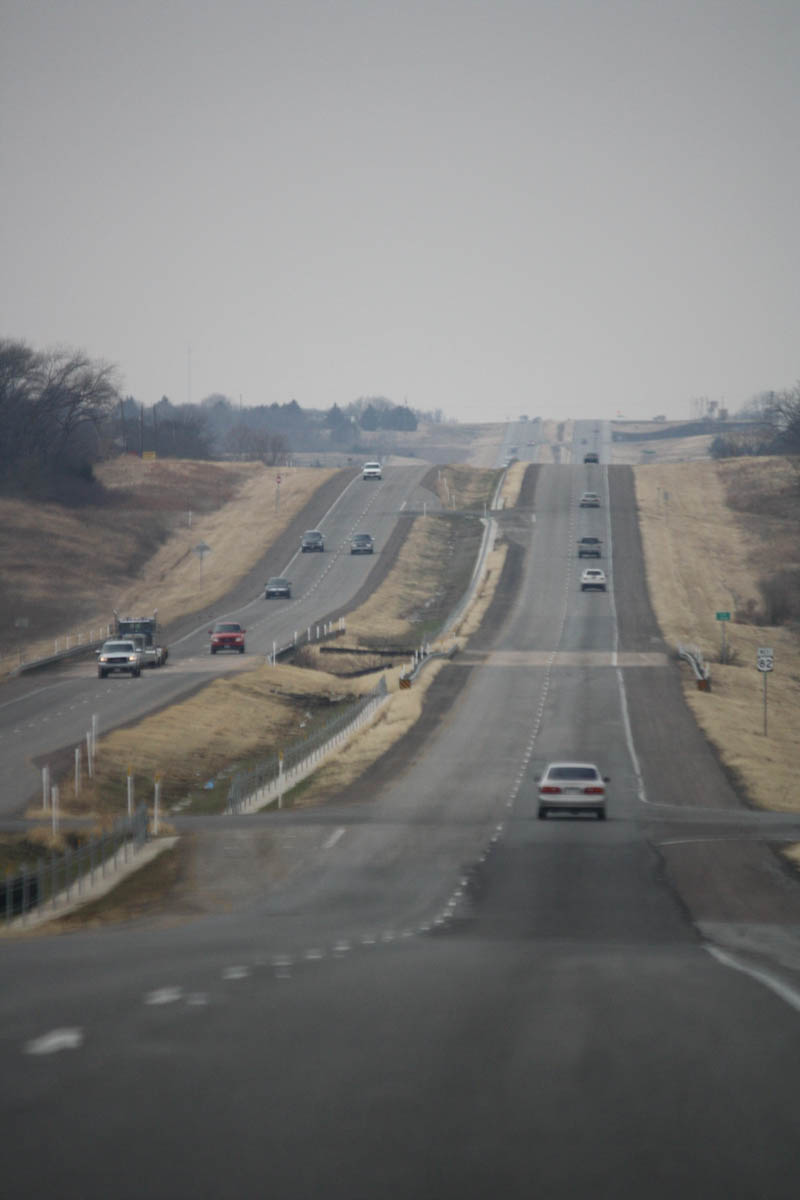
Heading west on US-82 out of Sherman, TX

== Major intersections ==
County	Location	mi	km	Exit	Destinations	Notes
Texas–New Mexico line		0.00	0.00		US 82 west – Lovington	Continuation into New Mexico
Yoakum		0.1	0.16		FM 769 to SH 83	
Yoakum		11.6	18.7		FM 1622 south	
Yoakum	Plains	14.9	24.0		US 380 west – Roswell	West end of US 380 overlap
Yoakum	Plains	15.9	25.6		SH 214 – Morton, Denver City	
Yoakum		19.9	32.0		FM 435 south	
Yoakum		27.9	44.9		FM 1780 – Whiteface, Seagraves	
Terry		36.5	58.7		FM 402	
Terry	Gomez	41.4	66.6		FM 303	
Terry	Brownfield	46.5	74.8		SH 137 (14th Street)	
Terry	Brownfield	47.4	76.3		US 62 west / US 385 south (South 1st Street) – Seminole	West end of US 62 / US 385 overlap
Terry	Brownfield	47.5	76.4		US 380 east (Tahoka Highway) – Terry County Airport	East end of US 380 overlap
Terry	Brownfield	48.4	77.9		US 385 north – Levelland	East end of US 385 overlap
Terry	Brownfield	48.5	78.1		FM 2066 north	
Terry		52.1	83.8		FM 1698 east	
Terry	Meadow	58.6	94.3		FM 211 – New Home	
Hockley	Ropesville	65.3	105.1		FM 41 / FM 168 – Smyer, Slaton	
Lubbock		72.3	116.4		FM 1585 east	West end of FM 1585 overlap
Lubbock		74.0	119.1		FM 1585 west	East end of FM 1585 overlap; future Loop 88
Lubbock	Wolfforth	74.8	120.4		Loop 193 – Wolfforth	Interchange; west end of freeway
Lubbock	Wolfforth	75.4	121.3		FM 179 – Wolfforth	
Lubbock	Wolfforth	76.9	123.8		Loop 193 / 82nd Street – Wolfforth	
Lubbock	Lubbock	78.9	127.0		Upland Avenue	
Lubbock	Lubbock	79.7	128.3		Spur 327 east	Eastbound exit and westbound entrance
Lubbock	Lubbock	79.9	128.6		Milwaukee Avenue	
Lubbock	Lubbock	81.0	130.4		Loop 289 (West Loop)	
Lubbock	Lubbock	82.1	132.1		34th Street / Slide Road	
Lubbock	Lubbock	83.6	134.5		Quaker Avenue	
Lubbock	Lubbock	84.0	135.2		US 62 east / SH 114 (19th Street) – Texas Tech University	East end of US 62 overlap; no direct exits to SH 114 west (EB signed at Quaker Avenue; WB signed at Texas Tech Parkway); access to Covenant Hospital and University Medical Center
Lubbock	Lubbock	84.5	136.0		Texas Tech Parkway – Texas Tech University	Access to University Medical Center
Lubbock	Lubbock	86.4	139.0		FM 2255 west (4th Street)	Westbound exit and eastbound entrance
Lubbock	Lubbock	85.6	137.8		University Avenue – Texas Tech University	
Lubbock	Lubbock	86.5	139.2		US 84 (Avenue Q)	
Lubbock	Lubbock	87.3	140.5		Avenue L / Texas Avenue / Buddy Holly Avenue	no direct westbound exit (signed at I-27)
Lubbock	Lubbock	88.0	141.6		I-27 / US 87 – Amarillo, Tahoka	Interchange; east end of freeway; I-27 exit 4
Lubbock	Lubbock	90.7	146.0		US 62 west / SH 114 west (Idalou Road) / Frontage Road	Interchange; no westbound entrance; west end of US 62 / SH 114 overlap
Lubbock	Lubbock	90.9	146.3		Loop 289 (East Loop)	Interchange
Lubbock		94.6	152.2		FM 2641 west – Airport	
Lubbock		95.9	154.3		FM 1729 south – Buffalo Springs Lake, Ransom Canyon	west end of FM 1729 overlap
Lubbock		97.0	156.1		FM 1729 north – New Deal	east end of FM 1729 overlap
Lubbock		100.0	160.9		FM 400 – Plainview, Slaton, Ransom Canyon	
Lubbock		103.1	165.9		FM 789 south	west end of FM 789 overlap
Lubbock		104.1	167.5		FM 789 north – Petersburg	east end of FM 789 overlap
Crosby	Lorenzo	107.6	173.2		FM 378 north – Downtown Lorenzo	west end of FM 378 overlap
Crosby	Lorenzo	108.1	174.0		FM 378 south	east end of FM 378 overlap
Crosby		111.4	179.3		FM 2236 north	
Crosby		113.4	182.5		FM 2576 south	
Crosby		115.5	185.9		US 62 east – Floydada	east end of US 62 overlap
Crosby	Ralls	116.1	186.8		SH 207 to US 62 east – Floydada, Post	
Crosby		118.8	191.2		FM 1831 south	
Crosby	Crosbyton	124.9	201.0		FM 651 – Post, White River Lake	
Crosby		128.6	207.0		FM 2591 north	
Crosby		133.2	214.4		FM 28 north – Dougherty	
Crosby		135.2	217.6		FM 836 – Spur	
Dickens		138.5	222.9		FM 264 north – McAdoo	
Dickens		148.4	238.8		Loop 120 east	
Dickens	Dickens	149.2	240.1		SH 70 – Matador, Spur	
Dickens	Dickens	149.6	240.8		Loop 120 (Montgomery Street)	
Dickens		154.1	248.0		FM 265 north – East Afton	
Dickens		161.0	259.1		FM 2941 north	
King		180.9	291.1		US 83 – Guthrie, Aspermont	Interchange
King		195.0	313.8		SH 222 east – Knox City	
Knox	Benjamin	212.6	342.1		SH 6 – Crowell, Knox City	
Knox		219.9	353.9		FM 267 north – Gilliland	west end of FM 267 overlap
Knox		220.1	354.2		FM 267 south – Rhineland, Munday	east end of FM 267 overlap
Knox		230.3	370.6		FM 266 south – Goree	
Baylor	Red Springs	235.3	378.7		FM 2069 east	
Baylor		239.3	385.1		FM 1789 north	
Baylor	Seymour	244.2	393.0		Bus. US 183 south / SH 114 east (Main Street) / FM 422 east (California Street) – Fort Worth, Throckmorton, Abilene	East end of SH 114 overlap; west end of US 183 Bus. overlap
Baylor	Seymour	245.1	394.5		RM Spur 1919	
Baylor		245.3	394.8		RM 1919 north – Crowell	
Baylor		246.3	396.4		US 183 south / US 277 south / US 283 south	interchange; east end of US 183 Bus. overlap; west end of US 183 / US 277 / US 283 overlap
See US 277
Wichita	Wichita Falls	294.4	473.8		US 277 north / US 281 north / US 287 north to I-44 – Lawton, Amarillo	East end of US 277 overlap; west end of US 281 / US 287 overlap
See US 287
Clay	Henrietta	311.7	501.6		US 287 south – Bowie, Fort Worth	Interchange; east end of US 287 overlap
Clay	Henrietta	313.0	503.7		SH 148 north – Petrolia	West end of SH 148 overlap
Clay	Henrietta	313.4	504.4		SH 148 south – Jacksboro	East end of SH 148 overlap
Clay	Henrietta	313.5	504.5		FM 1197 north (Bridge Street)	
Clay	Henrietta	314.0	505.3		Spur 510 south – Fort Worth	
Clay		323.6	520.8		FM 1134 south	
Clay		325.6	524.0		FM 2332 west	
Montague	Ringgold	328.1	528.0		Loop 19 east	
Montague	Ringgold	328.3	528.3		US 81 – Waurika, Bowie	Interchange
Montague	Belcherville	334.7	538.6		FM 1816 – Bowie	
Montague	Nocona	340.9	548.6		SH 175 south – Montague	
Montague	Nocona	341.0	548.8		FM 103 north (Clay Street) – Prairie Valley, Spanish Fort	
Montague		348.7	561.2		FM 1815 north – Bonita	
Montague	Saint Jo	353.9	569.5		SH 59 south – Bowie	
Montague	Saint Jo	354.6	570.7		FM 677 – Illinois Bend, Forestburg	
Montague	Saint Jo	354.8	571.0		FM 2382 north – Bulcher	
Cooke	Muenster	363.7	585.3		FM 373 (Main Street) – Bulcher	
Cooke		366.3	589.5		FM 2739 north – Marysville	
Cooke	Myra	367.4	591.3		FM 1198 south	
Cooke	Lindsay	372.4	599.3		FM 1199 north	west end of FM 1199 overlap
Cooke	Lindsay	372.5	599.5		FM 1199 south (Ash Street) to FM 3108 south	east end of FM 1199 overlap
Cooke	Lindsay	372.9	600.1		FM 3108 south	
Cooke	Gainesville	375.0	603.5		FM 1201 north – Moss Lake, Sivells Bend	
Cooke	Gainesville	376.4	605.8		I-35 (US 77) – Oklahoma City, Denton	I-35 exit 498
Cooke	Gainesville	376.9	606.6		Dixon Street	Interchange; eastbound exit and westbound entrance
Cooke	Gainesville	377.6	607.7		FM 372 (Grand Avenue)	Interchange
Cooke	Gainesville	379.3	610.4		FM 3092 south	
Cooke	Gainesville	380.7	612.7		FM 371 north – Walnut Bend	
Cooke	Oak Ridge	384.9	619.4		FM 678 – Woodbine, Callisburg	Interchange
Grayson	Whitesboro	388.8	625.7	622	SH 56 (Main Street)	Interchange
Grayson	Whitesboro	390.9	629.1	624	US 377 to Bus. US 377 (Union Street) – Madill	Interchange
Grayson	Sadler	394.3	634.6	628	FM 901 – Sadler	Interchange
Grayson	Sherman	403.0	648.6	636	SH 289 – Pottsboro, Dallas, NTRA	Interchange
Grayson	Sherman	406.0	653.4	640	FM 1417 – Pottsboro, NTRA	interchange; west end of freeway
Grayson	Sherman	407.5	655.8	641	FM 131 (Travis Street)	no direct westbound exit (signed at exit 642A)
Grayson	Sherman	407.9	656.5	642	US 75 – Denison, Dallas	US 75 exit 63
Grayson	Sherman	408.5	657.4	642B	Loy Lake Road	
Grayson	Sherman	409.0	658.2	643	SH 91 (Texoma Parkway)	
Grayson	Sherman	409.9	659.7	644	Skaggs Road	No direct westbound exit (signed at exit 645)
Grayson	Sherman	410.9	661.3	645	FM 1417	interchange; east end of freeway
Grayson	Bells	419.2	674.6	653	US 69 – Denison, Bells	Interchange
Grayson	Bells	420.1	676.1	654	FM 1897 – Bells, Ambrose	Interchange
Fannin	Savoy	423.1	680.9	658	FM 1752 – Savoy	Interchange
Fannin	Ector	428.1	689.0		FM 898 – Ravenna, Whitewright	
Fannin		430.6	693.0		FM 87 south – Choice Moore Unit, Buster Cole Unit	
Fannin	Bonham	432.8	696.5	670	SH 121 – Randolph, Trenton	interchange
Fannin	Bonham	433.7	698.0	671	SH 78 – Durant, Bonham	interchange; access to TMC Bonham Hospital
Fannin	Lannius	440.8	709.4		FM 897 – Dodd City	
Fannin		443.6	713.9		FM 1743 – Windom	
Fannin	Honey Grove	447.8	720.7		FM 1396 – Allens Chapel, Ivanhoe	
Fannin	Honey Grove	449.2	722.9	686	SH 34 / FM 100 – Honey Grove	Interchange
Fannin	Honey Grove	452.0	727.4		SH 56 west – Honey Grove	
Lamar	Petty	454.5	731.4		FM 38 south – Tigertown, Maxey	
Lamar	Petty	455.1	732.4		FM 1509 east – Brookston	
Lamar	Petty	455.4	732.9		FM 137 east – Roxton	
Lamar	Brookston–Toco line	462.6	744.5		FM 38 – Maxey, Tigertown, Roxton	
Lamar	Paris	467.1	751.7		FM 1510 west – Toco	
Lamar	Paris	468.5	754.0		Bus. US 82 east / Loop 286 south to SH 19 / SH 24 – Roxton, Cooper	Interchange; west end of Loop 286 overlap
Lamar	Paris	470.4	757.0		FM 79 – Sumner	Interchange
Lamar	Paris	471.8	759.3		US 271 north (US 271 Bus. south) – Hugo, Poteau	Interchange; west end of US 271 overlap
Lamar	Paris	472.3	760.1		Stillhouse Road	Interchange, access to Paris Regional Medical Center
Lamar	Paris	473.2	761.5		Spur 139 east to FM 195 – Faught, Albion	
Lamar	Paris	473.5	762.0		FM 195 – Faught, Albion	Interchange
Lamar	Paris	474.7	764.0		Pine Mill Road	Interchange
Lamar	Paris	475.1	764.6		US 271 south / Bus. US 82 west / Loop 286 south – Mount Pleasant, Cooper	Interchange; east end of US 271/Loop 286 overlap
Lamar	Reno	478.1	769.4		FM 1508 south to US 271 – Airport	
Lamar	Sun Valley	479.7	772.0		FM 2121 south	
Lamar	Blossom	482.5	776.5		FM 196 north (High Street) – Faught	West end of FM 196 overlap
Lamar	Blossom	482.8	777.0		FM 194 east / FM 196 south – Pattonville, Detroit	East end of FM 196 overlap
Lamar	Blossom	483.9	778.8		FM 1502 north – Faught	
Red River	Detroit	489.6	787.9		FM 410 to FM 194 – Kiomatia, Rugby, Blossom	
Red River	Detroit	490.4	789.2		FM 2573 east – Bagwell	
Red River		498.0	801.5		FM 2573 west – Bagwell	
Red River	Clarksville	500.3	805.2		FM 2825 southto2=to / SH 37 south	
Red River	Clarksville	501.7	807.4		Bus. US 82 east / SH 37 south – Bogata, Mount Vernon	West end of SH 37 overlap
Red River	Clarksville	503.2	809.8		SH 37 north / Bus. SH 37 south – Idabel, Albion	Interchange; east end of SH 37 overlap
Red River	Clarksville	504.6	812.1		FM 1159 – Albion	
Red River	Clarksville	504.9	812.6		Bus. US 82 west	
Red River		505.2	813.0		FM 114 east – English, Springhill	
Red River		505.6	813.7		FM 412 south – Boxelder	
Red River	Annona	511.5	823.2		FM 44 north	West end of FM 44 overlap
Red River	Annona	511.6	823.3		FM 44 south – Boxelder, Siloam	East end of FM 44 overlap
Red River		517.7	833.2		FM 1699 north – English	
Red River	Avery	519.7	836.4		FM 911 north	West end of FM 911 overlap
Red River	Avery	519.9	836.7		Bus. US 82 east / FM 911 south	East end of FM 911 overlap
Red River	Avery	520.4	837.5		Bus. US 82 west	
Bowie	Oak Grove	525.7	846.0		FM 1326 north – Springhill	
Bowie	De Kalb	528.9	851.2		US 259 – Idabel, Broken Bow, Daingerfield, Omaha	Interchange
Bowie	De Kalb	530.1	853.1		FM 2735 north – Springhill	
Bowie	De Kalb	530.3	853.4		FM 992 (Runnels Street) – Omaha, New Boston	
Bowie	De Kalb	530.8	854.2		FM 1840 east – Boston	
Bowie	Malta	536.0	862.6		FM 2789 north	
Bowie		539.2	867.8		SH 98 south / FM 3378 north to FM 992 / I-30 west – Simms	
Bowie		539.9	868.9		I-30 – Texarkana, Dallas	I-30 exit 199
Bowie	New Boston	542.0	872.3		FM 992 west – Daniels Chapel, De Kalb	
Bowie	New Boston	543.0	873.9		SH 8 – Foreman, Linden	Interchange
Bowie		547.2	880.6		Spur 86 north to I-30 / James Carlow Drive	
Bowie	Hooks	548.5	882.7		Spur 594 north to I-30 – RRAD Main Gate	
Bowie	Hooks	549.9	885.0		FM 560 north (Main Street) to I-30	
Bowie	Hooks	551.6	887.7		FM 1398 east – Red Bank	
Bowie	Leary	552.9	889.8		Spur 74 north (Lone Star Drive) to I-30	
Bowie	Leary	554.2	891.9		FM 1398 west (Barkman Creek Road) – Red Bank	
Bowie	Leary	554.9	893.0		FM 2253 north to I-30	
Bowie		556.8	896.1		FM 3419 north – Red Lick	
Bowie		557.6	897.4		FM 2148 – Red Lick	
Bowie	Nash	559.3	900.1		FM 989 (Kings Highway) – Wamba, Wake Village	
Bowie	Texarkana	561.2	903.2		I-369 / US 59 (Sowell Lane / North Bishop Road)	I-369 exit 114A northbound, 114 southbound
Bowie	Texarkana	563.3	906.5		SH 93 (Summerhill Road)	
Bowie	Texarkana	563.9	907.5		Loop 14 north (Texas Boulevard)	
Bowie	Texarkana	564.5	908.5		US 67 south (Martin Luther King Jr. Boulevard)	West end of US 67 overlap
Bowie	Texarkana	564.9	909.1		US 71 north (State Line Avenue) US 67 north / US 71 south / US 82 east (Seventh Street)	Arkansas state line; east end of US 71 overlap
1.000 mi = 1.609 km; 1.000 km = 0.621 mi: Closed/former; Concurrency terminus; Incomplete access

== Notes ==
U.S. Route 82
Previous state: New Mexico	Texas	Next state: Arkansas
