= List of Farm to Market Roads in Texas (1300–1399) =

- Texas Farm to Market Road and Ranch to Market Road markers

Highway names
- Interstates: Interstate Highway X (IH-X, I-X)
- US Highways: U.S. Highway X (US X)
- State: State Highway X (SH X)
- Loops: Loop X
- Spurs: Spur X
- Recreational: Recreational Road X (RE X)
- Farm or Ranch to Market Roads: Farm to Market Road X (FM X); Ranch to Market Road X (RM X)
- Park Roads: Park Road X (PR X)

System links
- Highways in Texas; Interstate; US; State; Former; Toll; Loops; Spurs; FM/RM; Park; Rec

Farm to Market Roads in Texas are owned and maintained by the Texas Department of Transportation (TxDOT).

== FM 1300 ==
Farm to Market Road 1300
- Location: Wharton and Jackson counties
- Length: 22.338 mi (Note: The certified length given is shorter than the actual mileage, as the Texas Department of Transportation description of FM 1300 considers it to be discontinuous at rather than concurrent with FM 1160.) (35.950 km)
- Existed: July 14, 1949–present

Farm to Market Road 1300 (FM 1300) is located in Wharton and Jackson counties.

FM 1300 begins at an intersection with FM 530 south of Speaks. The highway travels in a mostly eastern direction through rural farm areas. FM 1300 has a brief overlap with FM 1160, then continues to run east, ending at an intersection with SH 71 near El Campo.

FM 1300 was designated on July 14, 1949, running from FM 1160 westward at a distance of 3.5 miles (5.6 km). On October 5, 1953, the highway was extended eastward to SH 71 over an old routing of FM 1160. FM 1300 was extended 5.5 miles (8.9 km) westward to a county road on November 21, 1956. The highway was extended 8.1 miles (13.0 km) westward to FM 530 on October 31, 1958.

Junction list

County	Location	mi	km	Destinations	Notes
Jackson		0.0	0.0	FM 530 – Speaks, Edna	
Wharton		16.6	26.7	FM 1160 south – Louise	West end of FM 1160 overlap
Wharton		16.8	27.0	FM 1160 north	East end of FM 1160 overlap
Wharton		19.6	31.5	FM 441 south – Hillje	
Wharton		22.5	36.2	SH 71 – El Campo	
1.000 mi = 1.609 km; 1.000 km = 0.621 mi: Concurrency terminus

== FM 1301 ==
Farm to Market Road 1301
- Location: Wharton, Matagorda, and Brazoria counties
- Length: 32.312 mi (52.001 km)
- Existed: July 14, 1949–present

Farm to Market Road 1301 (FM 1301) is located in Wharton, Matagorda, and Brazoria counties.

Farm to Market Road 1301 begins as a four-lane highway (Boling Highway) in the heart of Wharton, passing Wharton County Junior College. Leaving Wharton, FM 1301 travels south-southeast towards Boling, with a four way stop at FM 442. Continuing southwest, FM 1301 makes a brief turn to the south before entering Matagorda County and the unincorporated town of Pledger where the highway meets intersects FM 1728 as FM 1301 makes a hairpin V-shaped turn to the northeast, then curving back to the south and east into Brazoria County. FM 1301 continues on a generally east-southeast route until it intersects SH 35 just shy of West Columbia.

FM 1301 was originally designated on July 14, 1949, from US 59 (later Loop 183, now Bus. US 59) north of Wharton southeast 15.9 miles (25.6 km) to the Matagorda County line. Two months later the road was extended to an intersection with SH 36 in West Columbia, replacing FM 1452. On June 15, 1955, the road was extended 0.6 miles (0.97 km) to SH 35 in West Columbia, replacing Spur 59. On July 30, 1998, at district request, SH 35 was rerouted over a portion of FM 1301 from SH 36 to new SH 35.

Junction list

County	Location	mi	km	Destinations	Notes
Wharton	Wharton	0.0	0.0	Bus. US 59 / SH 60 – El Campo, Hungerford	Western terminus of FM 1301; access to OakBend Medical Center
Wharton		7.6	12.2	FM 2817 south	
Wharton	Boling	8.9	14.3	FM 1096 – Lane City	
Wharton	Boling	10.4	16.7	FM 442 – Needville, Lane City	
Matagorda	Pledger	16.6	26.7	FM 1728 south	Northern terminus of FM 1728
Brazoria		24.7	39.8	FM 524 south – Old Ocean	Northern terminus of FM 524
Brazoria		26.4	42.5	FM 1459 south – Sweeny	Northern terminus of FN 1459
Brazoria	West Columbia	32.9	52.9	SH 35 – Angleton, Bay City	Southern terminus of FM 1301
1.000 mi = 1.609 km; 1.000 km = 0.621 mi

== FM 1302 ==
Farm to Market Road 1302
- Location: Dickens County
- Length: 1.038 mi (1.670 km)
- Existed: July 28, 1959–present

Farm to Market Road 1302 (FM 1302) is located entirely within Dickens County.

The current FM 1302 was designated in 1959, running from FM 1868 westward to County Road 419. At both termini, the roadway continues as County Road 470.

=== FM 1302 (1949) ===
Farm to Market Road 1302
- Location: Victoria County
- Existed: July 21, 1949–November 25, 1958

A previous route numbered FM 1302 was designated on July 21, 1949, from US 87 in Placedo northeast 5.0 miles (8.0 km) to FM 404. On September 29, 1954, a 4.5-mile (7.2 km) section from Placedo to Mitchell Siding was added. On October 31, 1957, the road was extended northeast 5.6 miles (9.0 km) to the Jackson County line. FM 1302 was cancelled on November 25, 1958, and transferred to FM 616.

== FM 1303 ==
Farm to Market Road 1303
- Location: Wilson and Bexar counties
- Length: 13.209 mi (21.258 km)
- Existed: May 23, 1951–present

Farm to Market Road 1303 (FM 1303) is located in Wilson and Bexar counties.

FM 1303 begins at an intersection with FM 536 northwest of Floresville. The highway travels in a northwestern direction, ending at an intersection with Loop 1604 southwest of Elmendorf.

The current FM 1303 was designated on May 23, 1951 (numbered August 16), running from FM 536 northwest of Floresville to a road intersection at a distance of 3.8 miles (6.1 km). On September 27, 1960, the highway was extended 4.0 miles (6.4 km) to Cano Verde. On June 1, 1965, FM 1303 was extended 5.9 miles (9.5 km) northwestward to FM 1518 (now Loop 1604).

Junction list

County	Location	mi	km	Destinations	Notes
Wilson		0.0	0.0	FM 536 – Floresville	
Wilson		7.2	11.6	FM 775 north to US 181	
Wilson		10.7	17.2	FM 2576 south to FM 536	
Bexar		13.2	21.2	Loop 1604 to I-37 / US 181	
1.000 mi = 1.609 km; 1.000 km = 0.621 mi

=== FM 1303 (1949) ===
Farm to Market Road 1303
- Location: Andrews County
- Existed: July 14, 1949–August 16, 1951

A previous route numbered FM 1303 was designated in 1949, running from FM 87 near Frankel City southward to FM 703 at distance of 13.0 miles (20.9 km). FM 1303 was cancelled on August 16, 1951, and transferred to FM 181.

== FM 1304 ==
Farm to Market Road 1304
- Location: Hill County
- Length: 14.375 mi (Note: The certified length given is shorter than the actual mileage, as the Texas Department of Transportation description of FM 1304 considers it to be discontinuous at rather than concurrent with FM 2114.) (23.134 km)
- Existed: October 28, 1953–present

Farm to Market Road 1304 (FM 1304) is located entirely within Hill County.

The current FM 1304 was first designated in 1953, running from US 81 (now I-35) north of Abbott, southwestward to Menlow at a distance of 5.1 miles (8.2 km). The highway was extended 4.3 miles (6.9 km) to FM 2114 in 1961, absorbing FM 2487 in the process. In 1968, FM 1304 was extended 1.6 miles (2.6 km) to the intersection of County Roads 2200 and 2201, completing the highway's current route.

Junction list

The entire route is in Hill County.

Location	mi	km	Destinations	Notes
	0.0	0.0	County Road 2200 / County Road 2201	Western terminus; road continues as County Road 2201
	1.9	3.1	FM 2114 west – Whitney Dam	West end of FM 2114 overlap
	2.4	3.9	FM 2114 east – West, Waco	East end of FM 2114 overlap
	5.9	9.5	FM 933 – Aquilla, Whitney, Waco	
Abbott	14.9	24.0	I-35 (US 77) – Fort Worth, Dallas, Waco	Eastern terminus; road continues as County Road 3115; I-35 exit 359
1.000 mi = 1.609 km; 1.000 km = 0.621 mi: Concurrency terminus

=== FM 1304 (1949) ===
Farm to Market Road 1304
- Location: Briscoe County
- Existed: July 14, 1949–November 16, 1953

A previous route numbered FM 1304 was designated on July 14, 1949, from SH 86, 4 miles (6.4 km) west of Silverton, north and west 5 miles (8.0 km) to Tule Creek Canyon. FM 1304 was cancelled on November 16, 1953, and transferred to FM 146 (later FM 284, now SH 207).

== FM 1305 ==
Farm to Market Road 1305
- Location: Henderson County
- Length: 0.338 mi (544 m)
- Existed: May 5, 1966–present

Farm to Market Road 1305 (FM 1305) is located in Henderson County.

FM 1305 begins at an intersection with FM 315 just north of Poynor and travels in an eastward direction. After 0.338 miles, state maintenance ends and the road continues on as Henderson County Road 4235.

FM 1305 was designated on May 5, 1966 along the current route.

=== FM 1305 (1949) ===
Farm to Market Road 1305
- Location: Deaf Smith and Castro counties
- Existed: July 14, 1949–July 25, 1963

A previous route numbered FM 1305 was designated on July 14, 1949, from SH 86, 6 miles (9.7 km) west of Dimmitt, south 7.0 miles (11.3 km) to FM 1524. On January 21, 1956, the road was extended north 8.1 miles (13.0 km) to FM 1057. On October 31, 1957, the road was extended south 3.0 miles (4.8 km) to FM 145. On November 26, 1958, the road was extended north 7.1 miles (11.4 km) to US 385 some 2 miles (3.2 km) south of Hereford, replacing FM 2386 and creating a concurrency with FM 1057. This concurrency was removed on April 16, 1962. FM 1305 was cancelled on July 25, 1963, and transferred to FM 1055.

== FM 1306 ==
Farm to Market Road 1306
- Location: Cooke County
- Length: 1.706 mi (2.746 km)
- Existed: 1949–present

=== FM 1306 (1949) ===
Farm to Market Road 1306
- Location: Cochran County
- Existed: July 14, 1949–September 28, 1949

A previous route numbered FM 1306 was designated on July 14, 1949, to run from FM 769 (now FM 1780) 2.0 miles (3.2 km) south of Whiteface east 0.4 miles (0.64 km) to the Cochran/Hockley County Line. This route was cancelled on September 28, 1949 and removed from the highway system.

== FM 1307 ==
Farm to Market Road 1307
- Location: Cooke County
- Length: 2.498 mi (4.020 km)
- Existed: September 28, 1949–present

Farm to Market Road 1307 (FM 1307) is located in Cooke County in the city of Valley View.

FM 1307 begins at I-35 (US 77) in the southern part of the city. The highway travels in a northern direction along Lee Street, intersecting FM 922 near the city square. FM 1307 continues to run in a northern direction before ending at an intersection with the southbound frontage road of I-35.

FM 1307 was designated on September 28, 1949, along an old route of US 77, running 0.7 miles (1.1 km) south of Valley View to 1.4 miles (2.3 km) north of Valley View. The highway was extended on July 29, 1965, when US 77 was again rerouted with the construction of I-35.

Junction list

The entire route is in Valley View, Cooke County.

mi	km	Destinations	Notes
0.0	0.0	I-35 (US 77) – Denton	I-35 exit 486
1.1	1.8	FM 922 to I-35 – Era	
2.5	4.0	I-35 (US 77) – Gainesville	I-35 exit 488 (north) / 489 (south)
1.000 mi = 1.609 km; 1.000 km = 0.621 mi

=== FM 1307 (1949) ===
Farm to Market Road 1307
- Location: Cochran County
- Existed: July 14, 1949–September 28, 1949

A previous route numbered FM 1307 was designated on July 14, 1949, to run from FM 769 (now FM 1780) 7.0 miles (11.3 km) south of Whiteface east 0.6 miles (0.97 km) to the Cochran/Hockley County Line. This route was cancelled on September 28, 1949 and removed from the highway system.

== FM 1308 ==
Farm to Market Road 1308
- Location: Mitchell County
- Length: 5.167 mi (8.315 km)
- Existed: October 31, 1958–present

=== FM 1308 (1949) ===
Farm to Market Road 1308
- Location: Crosby County
- Existed: July 14, 1949–March 24, 1958

A previous route numbered FM 1308 was designated on July 14, 1949, from FM 122 (now SH 207), 8 miles (13 km) south of Ralls, east 2.3 miles (3.7 km) to Owens. On October 28, 1953, the road was extended 6.5 miles (10.5 km) east to FM 651. FM 1308 was cancelled on March 24, 1958, and transferred to FM 40.

== FM 1309 ==
Farm to Market Road 1309
- Location: Houston County
- Length: 2.115 mi (3.404 km)
- Existed: October 31, 1958–present

=== FM 1309 (1949) ===
Farm to Market Road 1309
- Location: Crosby County
- Existed: July 14, 1949–March 24, 1958

A previous route numbered FM 1309 was designated on July 14, 1949, from FM 122 (now SH 207), 5 miles (8.0 km) south of Ralls, west 2.3 miles (3.7 km) to a road intersection. On October 28, 1953, the road was extended west 4.8 miles (7.7 km) to FM 378. FM 1309 was cancelled on March 24, 1958, and transferred to FM 40.

== FM 1310 ==
Farm to Market Road 1310
- Location: Grayson County
- Length: 1.817 mi (2.924 km)
- Existed: March 22, 1960–present

=== FM 1310 (1949) ===
Farm to Market Road 1310
- Location: Hale and Floyd counties
- Existed: July 21, 1949–December 21, 1959

A previous route numbered FM 1310 was designated from Barwise east via FM 784 at Sandhill to Floydada, replacing a section of FM 784. The section from Sandhill to Floydada was returned to FM 784 on September 20, 1949, and FM 1310 was rerouted over a section of FM 784 from Sandhill north 4.0 miles (6.4 km) and east 1.0 mile (1.6 km) to a road intersection. On July 31, 1949, the road was extended east and north to US 70 at Lockney. On October 28, 1953, the road was extended 2.1 miles (3.4 km) west to the Hale County line and another 2.0 miles (3.2 km) west to FM 789 on December 2 of that year. The FM 1310 designation was extended on February 23, 1958, to FM 400 at Happy Union Gin, creating a concurrency with FM 789. FM 1310 was cancelled on December 21, 1959: the section from Lockney to FM 784 was transferred to FM 378 and the section from FM 784 to FM 400 (including the concurrency with FM 789) was transferred to FM 784.

== FM 1311 ==
Farm to Market Road 1311
- Location: McCulloch and Menard counties
- Length: 11.121 mi (17.898 km)
- Existed: July 21, 1949 (Note: FM 1311 was designated as RM 1311 from 1957 to 1992.)–present

Farm to Market Road 1311 (FM 1311) is located in McCulloch and Menard counties. It runs from US 190 southwest of Brady to SH 29 near Hext.

FM 1311 was designated on July 21, 1949, from FM 42 (now US 190), 3.2 miles (5.1 km) north of Calf Creek, south the same distance to Calf Creek. On January 30, 1951, the road was extended south 3 miles (4.8 km) to the Menard County line. The same day the road was extended 5.5 miles (8.9 km) miles south to SH 151 (now SH 29) near Hext. On June 19, 1957, the route was changed to RM 1311, but was changed back to FM 1311 on May 5, 1992.

== RM 1312 ==
Ranch to Market Road 1312
- Location: Crockett and Sutton counties
- Length: 13.067 mi (21.029 km)
- Existed: June 30, 1966–present

Ranch to Market Road 1312 (RM 1312) is located in Crockett and Sutton counties. It runs from I-10 just west of the Sutton County line east to I-10 near RM 1989.

RM 1312 was designated on June 30, 1966, on the current route on a former section of US 290, which was rerouted onto I-10.

=== FM 1312 (1949) ===
Farm to Market Road 1312
- Location: Terry and Gaines counties
- Existed: July 14, 1949–February 10, 1966

FM 1312 was designated on July 14, 1949, from FM 1066 (now Gaines County Road 120), 4 miles (6.4 km) south of Loop, to a point 5.0 miles (8.0 km) miles south. On June 21, 1951, the road was extended south 5.1 miles (8.2 km) miles to US 180. On December 14, 1956, the road was extended 12.7 miles (20.4 km) miles north to US 62 at Wellman, replacing a section of FM 1066. FM 1312 was cancelled on February 10, 1966, and became a portion of FM 303.

== FM 1313 ==
Farm to Market Road 1313
- Location: Lynn and Garza counties
- Length: 16.967 mi (27.306 km)
- Existed: 1949–present

== FM 1314 ==
Farm to Market Road 1314
- Location: Montgomery County
- Length: 20.265 mi (32.613 km)
- Existed: October 28, 1953–present

Farm to Market Road 1314 (FM 1314), also known as Conroe-Porter Road, is located in Montgomery County. Its southern terminus is at an intersection with Loop 494 in Porter. It runs westward approximately 0.5 miles (0.80 km) to the I-69/US 59 freeway. It turns to the northwest, crossing SH 99 and SH 242. FM 1314 then enters the eastern side of Conroe, where it reaches its northern terminus at SH 105.

The current FM 1314 was designated on October 28, 1953, between US 59 and SH 105. In 1970, the intersecting highway at its southern terminus was redesignated Loop 494 when the new US 59 freeway was built.

Junction list

The entire route is in Montgomery County.

Location	mi	km	Destinations	Notes
Porter	0.0	0.0	Loop 494	
Porter	0.2	0.32	I-69 / US 59 – Houston, Cleveland	I-69 exit 156
	4.6	7.4	SH 99 Toll (Grand Parkway) – Spring, New Caney	
	11.4	18.3	SH 242 to I-45 – The Woodlands, Patton Village	
Conroe	18.0	29.0	Loop 336 to I-45	
Conroe	20.3	32.7	SH 105 – Navasota, Cleveland	
Conroe	20.3	32.7	North Porter Road	Continuation beyond SH 105
1.000 mi = 1.609 km; 1.000 km = 0.621 mi: Tolled

=== FM 1314 (1949) ===
Farm to Market Road 1314
- Location: Hale and Lubbock counties
- Existed: July 14, 1949–December 30, 1953

FM 1314 was first designated on July 14, 1949, in Hale County from the Lubbock County line northward to FM 54 at Petersburg and continuing further north to an intersection north of town or a total distance of approximately 11.0 miles (17.7 km). On December 17, 1952, it was extended approximately 6.8 miles (10.9 km) from the Hale County line to approximately 1.0 mile (1.6 km) west of Estacado. FM 1314 was cancelled on December 30, 1953, and became a portion of FM 789.

== FM 1315 ==
Farm to Market Road 1315
- Location: Victoria County
- Length: 1.552 mi (2.498 km)
- Existed: January 31, 1969–present

Farm to Market Road 1315 (FM 1315) is located in Victoria County. It runs from US 77 Business to Loop 463.

FM 1315 was designated on January 31, 1969, from US 77 (now US 77 Business) in Victoria to a point 0.7 miles (1.1 km) northeast. On May 7, 1970, the road was extended northeast 0.5 miles (0.80 km). On April 30, 1987, a 0.6-mile (0.97 km) section from the end of FM 1315 northeast to then-proposed Loop 463 was added. On June 30, 1995, the entire route was transferred to UR 1315 and was one of a few FM routes to be signed as an urban road. On November 15, 2018, the route was changed back to FM 1315.

=== FM 1315 (1949) ===
Farm to Market Road 1315
- Location: Lamb and Hale counties
- Existed: July 14, 1949–September 19, 1968

A previous route numbered FM 1315 was designated on July 14, 1949, from FM 304 (now FM 168) at Hart Camp, east 4.0 miles (6.4 km) to the Hale County line. On October 31, 1958, the road was extended southeast 7.6 miles (12.2 km) to FM 594 (now FM 179). On November 26, 1958, the road was extended to US 87, replacing FM 2063 and creating a concurrency with FM 594 at Cotton Center. On May 2, 1962, the road was extended east 9 miles (14 km) to FM 400. On March 20, 1964, the concurrency with FM 594 was removed. FM 1315 was cancelled on September 19, 1968, and became a portion of FM 37.

== FM 1316 ==
Farm to Market Road 1316
- Location: Polk County
- Length: 2.205 mi (3.549 km)
- Existed: October 31, 1958–present

=== FM 1316 (1949) ===
Farm to Market Road 1316
- Location: Lubbock County
- Existed: July 14, 1949–October 14, 1954

The first route numbered FM 1316 was designated in Lubbock County on July 14, 1949, from US 62 at Wolfforth south 8.5 miles (13.7 km) to the Lynn County line. FM 1316 was cancelled on October 14, 1954, and became a portion of FM 1073.

=== FM 1316 (1955) ===
Farm to Market Road 1316
- Location: Bexar County
- Existed: September 21, 1955–August 8, 1958

The second route numbered FM 1316 was designated in Bexar County on September 21, 1955, from FM 78 east of Randolph Air Force Base southeast 6.0 miles (9.7 km) to US 90 (now concurrent with I-10). FM 1316 was cancelled on August 8, 1958, and transferred to FM 1518.

== FM 1317 ==
Farm to Market Road 1317
- Location: Lynn County
- Length: 14.158 mi (22.785 km)
- Existed: 1949–present

== FM 1318 ==
Farm to Market Road 1318
- Location: Swisher County
- Length: 11.582 mi (18.639 km)
- Existed: 1949–present

== RM 1319 ==
Ranch to Market Road 1319
- Location: Hutchinson and Moore counties
- Length: 14.14 mi (22.76 km)
- Existed: October 31, 1957 (Note: RM 1319 was originally designated as FM 1319 from 1957 to 1964.)–present

Originally FM 1319.

=== FM 1319 ===
Farm to Market Road 1319
- Location: Bastrop County
- Existed: July 14, 1949–March 29, 1957

FM 1319 was designated on July 14, 1949, from FM 20 near US 290 toward String Prairie, although the northern terminus was moved to US 290 (now SH 21) a year later. On December 17, 1952, the road was extended south 7.5 miles (12.1 km) to FM 535 west of Rosanky. FM 1319 was cancelled on March 29, 1957, and signed as SH 304 as it followed the same route as FM 1319.

== RM 1320 ==
Ranch to Market Road 1320
- Location: Blanco County
- Length: 10.352 mi (16.660 km)
- Existed: July 14, 1949 (Note: RM 1320 was originally designated as FM 1320 from 1949 to 1956.)–present

Originally FM 1320.

== RM 1321 ==
Ranch to Market Road 1321
- Location: Gray County
- Length: 13.84 mi (22.27 km)
- Existed: October 31, 1958–present

=== FM 1321 ===
Farm to Market Road 1321
- Location: Burnet County
- Existed: July 14, 1949–April 12, 1955

FM 1321 was designated on July 14, 1949, from US 83 at Watson's Store northeast 4.7 miles (7.6 km) toward Oakalla. On March 31, 1955, the road was extended northeast 2.8 miles (4.5 km) to Oakalla. FM 1321 was cancelled on April 12, 1955, and became a portion of FM 963 (now RM 963).

== FM 1322 ==
Farm to Market Road 1322
- Location: Caldwell County
- Length: 18.751 mi (30.177 km)
- Existed: 1949–present

== RM 1323 ==
Ranch to Market Road 1323
- Location: Gillespie and Blanco counties
- Length: 26.455 mi (42.575 km)
- Existed: July 14, 1949 (Note: RM 1323 was originally designated as FM 1323 from 1949 to 1956.)–present

Originally FM 1323.

== FM 1324 ==
Farm to Market Road 1324
- Location: Marion County
- Length: 2.539 mi (4.086 km)
- Existed: May 23, 1951–present

=== FM 1324 (1949) ===
Farm to Market Road 1324
- Location: Hays County
- Existed: July 14, 1949–June 27, 1951

A previous route numbered FM 1324 was designated on July 14, 1949, from SH 123 near San Marcos southeast 3.1 miles (5.0 km) to the Guadalupe County line. FM 1324 was cancelled on June 27, 1951, and became a portion of FM 621.

== FM 1325 ==
Farm to Market Road 1325
- Location: Travis and Williamson counties
- Length: 4.878 mi (7.850 km)
- Existed: 1949–present

Farm to Market Road 1325 (FM 1325) is located in Travis and Williamson counties.

== FM 1326 ==
Farm to Market Road 1326
- Location: Bowie County
- Length: 5.053 mi (8.132 km)
- Existed: May 23, 1951–present

Farm to Market Road 1326 (FM 1326) is located in Bowie County.

FM 1326 begins at an intersection with US 82 in Oak Grove. The highway travels in a mostly northern direction through rural farm land, ending at an intersection with FM 114 near Spring Hill.

The current FM 1326 was designated on May 23, 1951 (numbered on June 27, 1951), traveling from SH 26 (now US 259) north of De Kalb southwestward to Spring Hill at a distance of 4.1 miles (6.6 km). The highway was extended 7.3 miles (11.7 km) southward to US 82 at Oak Grove on October 13, 1954. Approximately 3.0 miles (4.8 km) of FM 1326 was transferred to FM 2735 on October 9, 1961, when SH 26 was rerouted. The section of highway between FM 114 and US 259 was transferred to FM 114 in 1964 when the US 259 rerouting was completed.

=== FM 1326 (1949) ===
Farm to Market Road 1326
- Location: Travis County
- Existed: July 14, 1949–June 27, 1951

A previous route numbered FM 1326 was designated on July 14, 1949, from SH 20 (now US 290) near Manor north 4.9 miles (7.9 km) to New Sweden. On May 23, 1951 FM 1326 was extended north to the Williamson County line. FM 1326 was cancelled on June 27, 1951, and became a portion of FM 973.

== FM 1327 ==
Farm to Market Road 1327
- Location: Travis County
- Length: 7.307 mi (11.759 km)
- Existed: July 14, 1949–present

Farm to Market Road 1327 (FM 1327) is a 7.3-mile (11.7 km) route in southern Travis County.

FM 1327 begins at I-35 exit 223 between Onion Creek and Buda in southern Travis County, near the Hays County line. This location also serves as the current western terminus of the SH 45 Toll Southeast toll road. The highway proceeds east, through the city of Creedmoor, where it crosses FM 1625. Its eastern terminus is at US 183 in Mustang Ridge. FM 1327 provides a free, at-grade alternative to the limited-access SH 45 toll road to its south, as this segment of the toll road lacks frontage roads.

FM 1327 was first designated on July 14, 1949. Its western terminus was near its current location, at the old alignment of US 81 prior to the construction of the Interstate 35 freeway, and its eastern terminus was in Creedmoor. On December 10, 1951, the route was extended eastward over the original alignment of FM 1625 to its current terminus at US 183 (then SH 29). 0.3 miles (0.48 km) of the old route were transferred to a new alignment of FM 1625.

== FM 1328 ==
Farm to Market Road 1328
- Location: Lynn County
- Length: 8.017 mi (12.902 km)
- Existed: October 21, 1981–present

Farm to Market Road 1328 (FM 1328) is located in Lynn County. It runs from US 380 between Brownfield and Tahoka northward 8 miles (13 km) to FM 1317 in Petty.

FM 1328 was designated on October 21, 1981, along the current route.

=== FM 1328/RM 1328 (1949) ===
Ranch to Market Road 1328
- Location: Williamson and Travis counties
- Existed: July 14, 1949 (Note: RM 1328 was originally designated as FM 1328 from 1949 to 1956.)–November 26, 1958

The first route numbered FM 1328 was designated in Williamson County on July 14, 1949, from SH 29 at Whitestone School west 1.8 miles (2.9 km) to the Travis County line. On May 23, 1951, the road was extended west 17.2 miles (27.7 km) to Travis Peak Road. On October 1, 1956, the route was redesignated Ranch to Market Road 1328 (RM 1328). The route was cancelled on November 26, 1958, and transferred to RM 1431.

=== FM 1328 (1964) ===
Farm to Market Road 1328
- Location: Milam County
- Existed: May 6, 1964–May 30, 1978

The second route numbered FM 1328 was designated in Milam County on May 6, 1964, from FM 437 at Davilla east 4.4 miles (7.1 km) to a road intersection. FM 1328 was cancelled on May 30, 1978, and became a portion of FM 1915.

== FM 1329 ==
Farm to Market Road 1329
- Location: Duval County
- Length: 33.787 mi (54.375 km)
- Existed: July 28, 1953–present

=== FM 1329 (1949) ===
Farm to Market Road 1329
- Location: Bell and Williamson counties
- Existed: July 14, 1949–July 10, 1953

A previous route numbered FM 1329 was designated on July 14, 1949, from SH 95 at Bartlett west 5.8 miles (9.3 km) to Schwertner. On November 20, 1951, the road was extended west 7.1 miles (11.4 km) to US 81 at Jarrell. On December 17, 1952, the road was extended west 14.8 miles (23.8 km) to SH 195 at Florence. FM 1329 was cancelled on July 10, 1953, and transferred to FM 1236 (now FM 487).

== FM 1330 ==
Farm to Market Road 1330
- Location: McLennan County
- Length: 2.197 mi (3.536 km)
- Existed: September 27, 1960–present

=== FM 1330 (1949) ===
Farm to Market Road 1330
- Location: Williamson County
- Existed: July 14, 1949–October 23, 1950

The first use of the FM 1330 designation was in Williamson County, from SH 104 at Jonah south 3.8 miles (6.1 km) to a road intersection. FM 1330 was cancelled on October 23, 1950, and removed from the highway system as the county was unable to obtain right-of-way for the route.

=== FM 1330 (1958) ===
Farm to Market Road 1330
- Location: Lee County
- Existed: October 31, 1958–December 8, 1959

The next use of the FM 1330 designation was in Lee County, from FM 141, some 12 miles (19 km) northeast of Giddings, east 5.8 miles (9.3 km) to Flag Pond Road (current FM 180). On November 24, 1959, FM 1330 was extended southeast 2.8 miles (4.5 km) to the Washington County line. FM 1330 was cancelled on December 8, 1959, and transferred to FM 1697.

== FM 1331 ==
Farm to Market Road 1331
- Location: Williamson and Milam counties
- Length: 15.724 mi (25.305 km)
- Existed: 1949–present

== FM 1332 ==
Farm to Market Road 1332
- Location: Atascosa County
- Length: 6.286 mi (10.116 km)
- Existed: July 14, 1949–present

Farm to Market Road 1332 (FM 1332) is located in Atascosa County. It runs from SH 16 in Jourdanton southwest and south 6.3 miles (10.1 km) before state maintenance ends. The roadway continues as CR 331.

FM 1332 was designated on July 14, 1949, from SH 173 (now SH 16) in Jourdanton southward and westward convert 4 miles (6.4 km). It was extended southward to the school of the community of La Parita on October 26 of that year.

== FM 1333 ==
Farm to Market Road 1333
- Location: Atascosa County
- Length: 18.211 mi (29.308 km)
- Existed: 1949–present

== FM 1334 ==
Farm to Market Road 1334
- Location: Atascosa County
- Length: 1.231 mi (1.981 km)
- Existed: 1949–present

== FM 1335 ==
Farm to Market Road 1335
- Location: Delta County
- Length: 0.759 mi (1,221 m)
- Existed: May 6, 1964–present

=== FM 1335 (1949) ===
Farm to Market Road 1335
- Location: Atascosa County
- Existed: July 14, 1949–October 17, 1960

A previous route numbered FM 1335 was designated on July 14, 1949, from US 281 southeast of Pleasanton northeast 2.4 miles (3.9 km) to McCoy. On November 24, 1959, the road was extended northeast 5.3 miles (8.5 km) from McCoy. FM 1335 was cancelled on October 17, 1960, and transferred to FM 541.

== FM 1336 ==
Farm to Market Road 1336
- Location: Angelina County
- Length: 1.814 mi (2.919 km)
- Existed: April 25, 1978–present

=== FM 1336 (1949) ===
Farm to Market Road 1336
- Location: Bandera County
- Existed: July 14, 1949–December 31, 1975

A previous route numbered FM 1336 was designated on July 14, 1949, from SH 16 at Medina west 8.2 miles (13.2 km) to a county road. On July 31, 1972, it was extended west an additional 2.0 miles (3.2 km). On November 25, 1975, the road was extended west 9.7 miles (15.6 km) to RM 187. FM 1336 was cancelled on December 31, 1975, and became a portion of RM 337.

== FM 1337 ==
Farm to Market Road 1337
- Location: Cochran County
- Length: 4.642 mi (7.471 km)
- Existed: September 26, 1979–present

Farm to Market Road 1337 (FM 1337) is located in Cochran County. It is 4.6 miles (7.4 km) in length.

The southern terminus of FM 1337 is at an intersection with SH 114, northwest of Whiteface. The northern terminus is at an intersection with FM 1780 east of Morton.

The current FM 1337 was designated on September 26, 1979, along the current route.

=== FM 1337 (1949) ===
Farm to Market Road 1337
- Location: Comal County
- Existed: July 14, 1949–September 5, 1973

A previous route numbered FM 1337 was designated on July 14, 1949, from FM 482 north and southwest 5.4 miles (8.7 km) to Bracken. FM 1337 was cancelled on September 5, 1973, and became a portion of FM 2252; the portion of FM 1337 in Bracken became a spur of FM 2252.

== FM 1338 ==
Farm to Market Road 1338
- Location: Kerr County
- Length: 5.898 mi (9.492 km)
- Existed: May 23, 1951–present

Farm to Market Road 1338 (FM 1338) is located in Kerr County.

FM 1338 begins at an intersection with SH 27 in western Kerrville. The highway travels in a northwestern direction through residential areas, leaving the Kerrville city limits near Doris Drive. After leaving Kerrville, FM 1338 travels through an area that features a mix of subdivisions and farm land, with the route becoming more rural near I-10. State maintenance for FM 1338 ends near the ranch Mustangs Forever, with the roadway continuing as Goat Creek Road. The section of highway in Kerrville is known locally as Goat Creek Road.

The current FM 1338 was designated on May 23, 1951, along the current route.

Junction list

The entire route is in Kerr County.

Location	mi	km	Destinations	Notes
Kerrville	0.0	0.0	SH 27 (Junction Highway) – Ingram, Kerrville	
Kerrville	0.4	0.64	Loop 98 east (Thompson Drive)	
	4.2	6.8	I-10 – Junction, Kerrville	I-10 exit 501
	5.9	9.5	Goat Creek Road	
1.000 mi = 1.609 km; 1.000 km = 0.621 mi

=== FM 1338 (1949) ===
Farm to Market Road 1338
- Location: Comal County
- Existed: July 14, 1949–September 15, 1949

A previous route numbered FM 1338 was designated on July 14, 1949, running from FM 1102 in Hunter south 4.2 miles (6.8 km) to a road intersection. Two months later FM 1338 was cancelled and became a portion of FM 1102.

== FM 1339 ==
Farm to Market Road 1339
- Location: Guadalupe County
- Length: 8.934 mi (14.378 km)
- Existed: 1949–present

== FM 1340 ==
Farm to Market Road 1340
- Location: Kerr County
- Length: 21.308 mi (34.292 km)
- Existed: 1949–present

Farm to Market Road 1340 (FM 1340) is located in Kerr County.

FM 1340 begins at an intersection with SH 39 at Hunt. The highway travels in a northwestern direction through largely rural farming and ranching areas, ending at an intersection with SH 41. FM 1340 runs parallel to the North Fork Guadalupe River for most of its length, crossing the river several times.

FM 1340 was designated on July 14, 1949, running from SH 39 in Hunt westward at a distance of 10.3 miles (16.6 km). The highway was extended 2.0 miles (3.2 km) westward on June 1, 1965. FM 1340 was extended 2.7 miles (4.3 km) westward on May 5, 1966. The route was extended 3.4 miles (5.5 km) westward on June 7, 1967. FM 1340 was extended 3.4 miles (5.5 km) northward to its current terminus at SH 41 on July 11, 1968.

== FM 1341 ==
Farm to Market Road 1341
- Location: Kerr County
- Length: 13.971 mi (22.484 km)
- Existed: 1949–present

Farm to Market Road 1341 (FM 1341) is located in Kerr County.

FM 1341 begins at an intersection with SH 16 in Kerrville near Hill Country High School. The highway travels in a southeast direction along Golf Avenue, turning northeast onto Cypress Creek Road at a traffic circle intersection with Tivy Street. FM 1341 travels through a residential area, leaving the Kerrville city limits just east of Loop 534. East of Kerrville, the highway travels through hilly terrain of the Texas Hill Country, running in close proximity to I-10. FM 1341 crosses under I-10 with no direct connection east of the Cypress Creek Community Center. The highway makes a nearly 90-degree turn at Board Mountain Road and runs in a southern direction before ending at I-10 in the Bear Creek area; the roadway continues past I-10 as Cypress Creek Road, which travels to Comfort.

FM 1341 was designated on July 14, 1949, running from SH 27 in Kerrville eastward at a distance of 11.3 miles (18.2 km). The highway was relocated on July 17, 1951, with the western terminus changing from SH 27 to SH 16. FM 1341 was extended 3.7 miles (6.0 km) southeastward to I-10 on November 25, 1975. On August 29, 1989, FM 1341 was rerouted from Wheless Avenue to Golf Avenue and Turner Street from SH 16 to Tivy Street.

Junction list

The entire route is in Kerr County.

Location	mi	km	Destinations	Notes
Kerrville	0.0	0.0	SH 16 (Sidney Baker Street) / Holdsworth Drive	
Kerrville	0.4	0.64	Tivy Street	Traffic circle
Kerrville	1.3	2.1	Loop 534 (Veterans Highway) to SH 16 / SH 173	
	14.2	22.9	I-10 – Junction, San Antonio	I-10 exit 520
1.000 mi = 1.609 km; 1.000 km = 0.621 mi

== FM 1342 ==
Farm to Market Road 1342
- Location: Potter and Carson counties
- Length: 13.23 mi (21.29 km)
- Existed: December 17, 1952–present

=== FM 1342 (1949) ===
Farm to Market Road 1342
- Location: La Salle County
- Existed: July 14, 1949–December 17, 1952

A previous route numbered FM 1342 was designated on July 14, 1949, from SH 97 in Los Angeles south and west 10.0 miles (16.1 km) to a road intersection. FM 1342 was cancelled on December 17, 1952, and transferred to FM 468.

== FM 1343 ==
Farm to Market Road 1343
- Location: Medina County
- Length: 13.233 mi (21.296 km)
- Existed: 1949–present

== FM 1344 ==
Farm to Market Road 1344
- Location: Wilson and Karnes counties
- Length: 16.305 mi (26.240 km)
- Existed: 1949–present

== FM 1345 ==
Farm to Market Road 1345 (FM 1345) is a designation that has been used twice. No highway currently uses the FM 1345 designation.

=== FM 1345 (1949) ===
Farm to Market Road 1345
- Location: Wilson County
- Existed: July 14, 1949–May 25, 1953

The first use of the FM 1345 designation was in Wilson County, from SH 97 southwest of Floresville south 2.3 miles (3.7 km) to a road intersection. On May 23, 1951, the road was extended southeast 3.5 miles (5.6 km) to FM 541. FM 1345 was cancelled on May 25, 1953, and transferred to FM 1344.

=== FM 1345 (1953) ===
Farm to Market Road 1345
- Location: Duval County
- Existed: July 28, 1953–August 29, 1990

The second use of the FM 1345 designation was in Duval County, from SH 339, 10 miles (16 km) south of Benavides, south 15.2 miles (24.5 km) to SH 285. On December 1, 1953, the route was signed, but not designated, as SH 339. FM 1345 was cancelled on August 29, 1990, as the SH 339 designation became official.

== FM 1346 ==
Farm to Market Road 1346
- Location: Bexar and Wilson counties
- Length: 20.298 mi (32.666 km)
- Existed: 1949–present

Farm to Market Road 1346 (FM 1346) is located in Bexar and Wilson counties.

FM 1346 begins at an intersection with Loop 13 (W.W. White Road) in eastern San Antonio. The highway travels in an eastern direction along Houston Street and has a junction with I-410 / SH 130 before running through a less developed area of the city and leaves the city at an intersection with Foster Road. FM 1346 intersects FM 1516 at Martinez then enters St. Hedwig at Loop 1604 then turns south at St. Hedwig Road before turning east at La Vernia Road in Carpenter. The highway turns southeast at Wilson County Road 347 and enters La Vernia, where FM 1346 ends at an intersection with FM 775.

FM 1346 was designated on July 14, 1949, traveling from US 87 west of La Vernia to Carpenter at a distance of 3.6 miles (5.8 km). The highway was extended 8.6 miles (13.8 km) to the end of FM 1980 on October 13, 1954, and on to Loop 13 on October 27, 1954, absorbing FM 1980 in the process. The section of FM 1346 between Loop 13 and I-410 was removed from the highway system on November 24, 1969, but was later restored on October 24, 1978. The section of highway between Loop 13 and FM 1516 was internally redesignated as Urban Road 1346 by TxDOT on June 27, 1995. FM 1346 was extended 1.05 miles (1.69 km) southeastward to FM 775 on July 31, 2008. On November 15, 2018, UR 1346 was changed back to FM 1346. The section of FM 1346 west of I-410 was proposed for decommissioning in 2014 as part of TxDOT's San Antonio turnback proposal, which would have turned back over 129 miles of roads to the city of San Antonio, but the city of San Antonio rejected that proposal.

Junction list

County	Location	mi	km	Destinations	Notes
Bexar	San Antonio	0.0	0.0	Loop 13 (W.W. White Road)	
Bexar	San Antonio	0.9	1.4	I-410 / SH 130	I-410 exit 34
Bexar	Martinez	4.3	6.9	FM 1516 – Converse, China Grove	
Bexar	St. Hedwig	9.0	14.5	Loop 1604 to I-10 / US 87	
Bexar	St. Hedwig	10.9	17.5	FM 1518 – Schertz, Elmendorf	
Wilson	La Vernia	19.6	31.5	US 87 – Stockdale, San Antonio	
Wilson	La Vernia	20.3	32.7	FM 775 to US 181 – La Vernia	
1.000 mi = 1.609 km; 1.000 km = 0.621 mi

== FM 1347 ==
Farm to Market Road 1347
- Location: Wilson County
- Length: 14.447 mi (23.250 km)
- Existed: 1949–present

== FM 1348 ==
Farm to Market Road 1348
- Location: Bee County
- Length: 0.519 mi (835 m)
- Existed: 1949–present

== FM 1349 ==
Farm to Market Road 1349
- Location: Bee County
- Length: 8.296 mi (13.351 km)
- Existed: 1949–present

== FM 1350 ==
Farm to Market Road 1350
- Location: Kerr County
- Length: 2.113 mi (3.401 km)
- Existed: May 23, 1951–present

Farm to Market Road 1350 (FM 1350) is located in Kerr County. It begins at an intersection with RM 480 in Center Point. FM 1350 continues east, ending at SH 27.

FM 1350 was designated on May 23, 1951, on its current route.

=== FM 1350 (1949) ===
Farm to Market Road 1350
- Location: Bee County
- Existed: July 14, 1949–November 17, 1949

FM 1350 was designated on July 14, 1949, from US 59 south of Beeville to the Bee–Live Oak county line near Argenta. Four months later FM 1350 was cancelled and transferred to FM 888.

== FM 1351 ==
Farm to Market Road 1351
- Location: Goliad County
- Length: 16.73 mi (26.92 km)
- Existed: 1949–present

== FM 1352 ==
Farm to Market Road 1352
- Location: Jim Wells County
- Length: 7.928 mi (12.759 km)
- Existed: 1949–present

== FM 1353 ==
Farm to Market Road 1353
- Location: Karnes County
- Length: 6.001 mi (9.658 km)
- Existed: 1949–present

== FM 1354 ==
Farm to Market Road 1354
- Location: Karnes County
- Length: 2.495 mi (4.015 km)
- Existed: 1949–present

== FM 1355 ==
Farm to Market Road 1355
- Location: Kleberg and Nueces counties
- Length: 7.28 mi (11.72 km)
- Existed: 1949–present

== FM 1356 ==
Farm to Market Road 1356
- Location: Kleberg County
- Length: 2.938 mi (4.728 km)
- Existed: 1949–present

== RM 1357 ==
Ranch to Market Road 1357
- Location: Midland, Glasscock, and Reagan counties
- Length: 30.111 mi (48.459 km)
- Existed: June 1, 1965–present

=== FM 1357 (1949) ===
Farm to Market Road 1357
- Location: Live Oak County
- Existed: July 14, 1949–October 14, 1954

The first use of the FM 1357 designation was in Live Oak County, from SH 9 (now I-37), 2.4 miles (3.9 km) north of SH 202 (now US 59), northeast 3.7 miles (6.0 km) to a road intersection with a 1.3 miles (2.1 km) spur connection. This spur was cancelled and renumbered as FM 1596 eight months later. On December 17, 1952, the road was extended southwest 3.9 miles (6.3 km) to SH 202. FM 1357 was cancelled on October 14, 1954, and became a portion of FM 799.

=== FM 1357 (1955) ===
Farm to Market Road 1357
- Location: Ector County
- Existed: September 21, 1955–April 3, 1964

The second use of the FM 1357 designation was in Ector County, from US 80, 4 miles (6.4 km) east of Odessa, to a point 2.7 miles (4.3 km) north. On December 15, 1958, the road was extended 0.8 miles (1.3 km) south to I-20. On June 30, 1961, a 2.7-mile (4.3 km) section north of US 80 was transferred to Loop 338. The remainder of FM 1357 (formerly a portion of Loop 338) was cancelled and transferred to Loop 338 on April 3, 1964.

== FM 1358 ==
Farm to Market Road 1358
- Location: Live Oak County
- Length: 15.825 mi (25.468 km)
- Existed: 1949–present

== FM 1359 ==
Farm to Market Road 1359
- Location: Live Oak County
- Length: 4.45 mi (7.16 km)
- Existed: 1949–present

== FM 1360 ==
Farm to Market Road 1360
- Location: Refugio County
- Length: 14.089 mi (22.674 km)
- Existed: 1949–present

== FM 1361 ==
Farm to Market Road 1361
- Location: Burleson County
- Length: 12.159 mi (19.568 km)
- Existed: 1949–present

== FM 1362 ==
Farm to Market Road 1362
- Location: Burleson County
- Length: 13.579 mi (21.853 km)
- Existed: 1949–present

== FM 1363 ==
Farm to Market Road 1363
- Location: Burleson County
- Length: 0.383 mi (616 m)
- Existed: 1949–present

== FM 1364 ==
Farm to Market Road 1364
- Location: Freestone County
- Length: 1.171 mi (1.885 km)
- Existed: 1949–present

== FM 1365 ==
Farm to Market Road 1365
- Location: Freestone and Limestone counties
- Length: 13.121 mi (21.116 km)
- Existed: 1949–present

== FM 1366 ==
Farm to Market Road 1366
- Location: Freestone County
- Length: 6.926 mi (11.146 km)
- Existed: 1949–present

== FM 1367 ==
Farm to Market Road 1367
- Location: Freestone County
- Length: 2.226 mi (3.582 km)
- Existed: 1949–present

== FM 1368 ==
Farm to Market Road 1368
- Location: Sabine County
- Length: 1.895 mi (3.050 km)
- Existed: October 31, 1958–present

=== FM 1368 (1949) ===
Farm to Market Road 1368
- Location: Freestone and Limestone counties
- Existed: July 14, 1949–May 31, 1955

A previous route numbered FM 1368 was designated on July 14, 1949, from FM 80 at Freestone west 4.2 miles (6.8 km) to the Limestone County line. On January 23, 1953, the road was extended southwest 0.4 miles (0.64 km) to SH 164. FM 1368 was cancelled on May 31, 1955, and became a portion of FM 489.

== FM 1369 ==
Farm to Market Road 1369 (FM 1369) is a designation that has been used twice. No highway currently uses the FM 1369 designation.

=== FM 1369 (1949) ===
Farm to Market Road 1369
- Location: Grimes County
- Existed: July 14, 1949–October 27, 1954

The first use of the FM 1369 designation was in Grimes County, from SH 90 at Anderson, southeast 15.5 miles (24.9 km) to Plantersville. FM 1369 was cancelled on October 27, 1954, and became a portion of FM 1774.

=== FM 1369 (1955) ===
Farm to Market Road 1369
- Location: Midland County
- Existed: September 21, 1955–July 24, 1984

The second use of the FM 1369 designation was in Midland County, from US 80 (now I-20 Business) some 2 miles (3.2 km) west of Midland, northwest 2.7 miles (4.3 km) to SH 158. On September 20, 1961, the road was extended south 0.9 miles (1.4 km) to I-20. In 1978, the route was co-located with Loop 250 and this co-location was removed on July 24, 1984, cancelling FM 1369.

== FM 1370 ==
Farm to Market Road 1370
- Location: Washington County
- Length: 4.878 mi (7.850 km)
- Existed: July 14, 1949–present

Fark to Market Road 1370 is located in Washington County. It runs from FM 1155 (former SH 90) to a point 5.1 miles southeast.

FM 1370 was designated on July 14, 1949 on the current route.

== FM 1371 ==
Farm to Market Road 1371
- Location: Washington and Austin counties
- Length: 9.232 mi (14.857 km)
- Existed: July 14, 1949–present

Farm to Market Road 1371 (FM 1371) is located in Washington and Austin counties. It runs from US 290 west of Chappell Hill south to FM 1456.

FM 1371 was designated on July 14, 1949, from US 290, 1 mile (1.6 km) east of Chappell Hill, south 6.1 miles (9.8 km) to the north end of the Caney Creek Bridge at the Austin County line. On April 24, 1953, the road was extended 2.2 miles (3.5 km) miles south to FM 1456. On July 31, 1964, the road was extended 1.53 miles (2.46 km) west along former US 290 to new US 290.

== FM 1372 ==
Farm to Market Road 1372
- Location: Madison County
- Length: 15.762 mi (25.366 km)
- Existed: 1949–present

Farm to Market Road 1372 (FM 1372) is located in Madison County. It begins at US 190/SH 21 west of Madisonville. It has one major intersection at FM 39 south of the community of North Zulch, where it continues west before it ends and becomes Democrat Road.

FM 1372 was designated on July 14, 1949, to run from FM 39 east 4.9 miles (7.9 km) to a road intersection. On November 21, 1956, the road was extended east 5.0 miles (8.0 km) to Union School. On October 31, 1957, the road was to be extended northeast 4.5 miles (7.2 km) to US 190, but this extension was rerouted and shortened to 2.2 miles (3.5 km) on March 26, 1958. On May 2, 1962, the road was extended southwest from FM 39 to a road intersection, completing its current route.

== FM 1373 ==
Farm to Market Road 1373
- Location: Robertson and Falls counties
- Length: 17.291 mi (27.827 km)
- Existed: 1949–present

== FM 1374 ==
Farm to Market Road 1374
- Location: Walker County
- Length: 18.018 mi (28.997 km)
- Existed: 1949–present

== FM 1375 ==
Farm to Market Road 1375
- Location: Montgomery and Walker counties
- Length: 22.786 mi (36.671 km)
- Existed: 1949–present

== RM 1376 ==
Ranch to Market Road 1376
- Location: Kendall and Gillespie counties
- Length: 31.796 mi (Note: The certified length given is shorter than the actual mileage, as the Texas Department of Transportation description of RM 1376 considers it to be discontinuous at rather than concurrent with RM 473.) (51.171 km)
- Existed: October 31, 1958–present

Ranch to Market Road 1376 (RM 1376) is located in Kendall and Gillespie counties in the Hill Country.

RM 1376 begins at an intersection with Bus. US 87 in Boerne. The highway travels in a mostly northern direction through semi-rural areas with some subdivisions and guest ranches, with the route becoming more rural north of Nollkamper Road. RM 1376 crosses the Guadalupe River, then has an overlap with RM 473 near Sisterdale. North of Sisterdale, the highway starts to travel through hilly areas, intersects RM 1888, and travels through Luckenbach. RM 1376 travels west of Cain City then ends at an intersection with US 290 southeast of Fredericksburg.

RM 1376 was designated on October 31, 1958, running from US 290 southeast of Fredericksburg, southeastward to the Kendall County line at a distance of 8.8 miles (14.2 km). On October 18, 1960, the highway was extended to US 87 (now Bus. US 87), absorbing FM 1892.

Junction list

County	Location	mi	km	Destinations	Notes
Kendall	Boerne	0.0	0.0	Bus. US 87 to I-10 – Comfort, Boerne	
Kendall		11.6	18.7	RM 473 east – Kendalia	South end of RM 473 overlap
Kendall	Sisterdale	12.5	20.1	RM 473 west – Comfort	North end of RM 473 overlap
Gillespie		26.4	42.5	RM 1888 east – Blanco	
Gillespie		32.7	52.6	US 290 – Fredericksburg, Johnson City	
1.000 mi = 1.609 km; 1.000 km = 0.621 mi: Concurrency terminus

=== FM 1376 (1949) ===
Farm to Market Road 1376
- Location: Collin County
- Existed: July 15, 1949–January 29, 1953

FM 1376 was designated on July 15, 1949, running from US 75 in Anna to Westminster at a distance of 6.8 miles (10.9 km). FM 1376 was cancelled on January 29, 1953, and transferred to FM 455 .

== FM 1377 ==
Farm to Market Road 1377
- Location: Collin County
- Length: 11.696 mi (18.823 km)
- Existed: 1949–present

Farm to Market Road 1377 (FM 1377) is located on the east side of Lucas in Collin County. FM 1377 starts in Princeton, at an intersection between 4th Street and Main Street. It goes north on 4th street before turning onto McKinney Avenue. It turns onto 6th Street, and once it reaches Monte Carlo Rd, the road continues with the name FM 1377. The end of the road is at an intersection with FM 545.

== FM 1378 ==
Farm to Market Road 1378
- Location: Collin County
- Length: 12.926 mi (20.802 km)
- Existed: 1949–present

Farm to Market Road 1378 (FM 1378) is a 9.9-mile (15.9 km) roadway located in southern Collin County. The route connects SH 5 to FM 2514. FM 1378 begins at an intersection with SH 5 south of McKinney, southeastward approximately 14.0 miles via Forest Grove and Lucas to FM 544 west of Wylie.

FM 1378 was designated on July 14, 1949, from US 75 (now SH 5) to Forest Grove. On May 23, 1951, FM 1378 was extended south to FM 1379 at Lucas. On September 14, 1951, FM 1378 was extended south to FM 544 (later FM 3412, now Brown Street), replacing FM 1379. On January 6, 1978, FM 1378 was extended south to current FM 544. This extension was transferred from FM 544. It was changed to Urban Road 1378 in 1995 by Texas Department of Transportation. On October 30, 2008, the section of FM 1378 between FM 2514 and FM 544 was removed from the state highway system and given to the City of Wylie. The removed segment has been widened to an urban multilane highway.

Junction list

The entire route is in Collin County.

Location	mi	km	Destinations	Notes
Fairview	0.000	0.000	SH 5	Western terminus
Fairview	3.261	5.248	FM 2786 west	Eastern terminus of FM 2786
Lucas	5.605	9.020	FM 2170 west	Eastern terminus of FM 2170
Lucas	7.593	12.220	FM 3286 east	Western terminus of FM 3286
Lucas	9.949	16.011	FM 2514	Eastern terminus
1.000 mi = 1.609 km; 1.000 km = 0.621 mi

== FM 1379 ==
Farm to Market Road 1379
- Location: Midland County
- Length: 32.44 mi (Note: The certified length given is shorter than the actual mileage, as the Texas Department of Transportation description of FM 1379 considers it to be discontinuous at rather than concurrent with SH 158.) (52.21 km)
- Existed: December 18, 1951–present

Farm to Market Road 1379 (FM 1379) is located in Midland County.

FM 1379 begins at an intersection with SH 349 south of Midland. The highway travels in a northeast direction, turning in a more northern direction at RM 1357. FM 1379 has an overlap with SH 158 before running through Greenwood, where the route ends at an intersection with FM 307.

The current FM 1379 was designated on December 18, 1951, running from FM 307 southward to SH 158 at a distance of 5.5 miles (8.9 km). The highway was extended 5.3 miles (8.5 km) south of SH 158 on October 31, 1957, creating an overlap with SH 158. FM 1379 was extended 16.2 miles (26.1 km) southward and westward to a county road on May 2, 1962. The highway was extended 5.0 miles (8.0 km) along County Road 300 to SH 349 on October 28, 1999.

Junction list

The entire route is in Midland County.

Location	mi	km	Destinations	Notes
	0.0	0.0	SH 349 – Midland, Rankin	
	7.9	12.7	FM 3095 south – Midkiff	
	14.9	24.0	RM 1357 south – Midkiff	
	25.8	41.5	SH 158 east – Garden City	South end of SH 158 overlap
	28.3	45.5	SH 158 west – Midland	North end of SH 158 overlap
Greenwood	35.0	56.3	FM 307 to SH 137 – Midland	
1.000 mi = 1.609 km; 1.000 km = 0.621 mi: Concurrency terminus

=== FM 1379 (1949) ===
Farm to Market Road 1379
- Location: Collin County
- Existed: July 15, 1949–September 14, 1951

A previous route numbered FM 1379 was designated on July 15, 1949, from FM 544 west of Wylie north 4.4 miles (7.1 km) to Lucas. FM 1379 was cancelled on September 14, 1951, and became a portion of FM 1378.

== FM 1380 ==
Farm to Market Road 1380
- Location: Motley County
- Length: 2.047 mi (3.294 km)
- Existed: September 26, 1979–present

Farm to Market Road 1380 (FM 1380) is located in Motley County, east of Matador. Its southern terminus is at CR 402; the roadway south of this point is CR 423. FM 1380 runs north approximately 2 miles (3.2 km), crossing US 62/US 70, before ending at FM 94.

The current FM 1380 was designated on September 26, 1979, along the current route.

=== FM 1380 (1949) ===
Farm to Market Road 1380
- Location: Dallas County
- Existed: July 25, 1949–August 21, 1978

A previous route numbered FM 1380 was designated on July 25, 1949, running from US 77 in Carrollton to a road intersection west of the Trinity River in Dallas County. FM 1380 was cancelled on August 21, 1978, and the roadway was given to the city of Carrollton. It is now a segment of Belt Line Road.

== FM 1381 ==
Farm to Market Road 1381
- Location: Parmer County
- Length: 1.256 mi (2.021 km)
- Existed: May 7, 1974–present

Farm to Market Road 1381 (FM 1381) is located in Parmer County.

FM 1381 begins at an intersection with US 60/SH 86 southwest of Bovina. The highway runs in a northern direction just west of the Bovina city limits for its entire length before ending at an intersection with FM 2290.

The current FM 1381 was designated on May 7, 1974, along the current route.

=== FM 1381 (1949) ===
Farm to Market Road 1381
- Location: Dallas County
- Existed: July 15, 1949–November 16, 1972

A previous route numbered FM 1381 was designated on July 15, 1949, from US 77 south of Dallas west 2.2 miles (3.5 km) to DeSoto. FM 1381 was cancelled on November 16, 1972, and became a portion of FM 1382.

== FM 1382 ==
Farm to Market Road 1382
- Location: Dallas County
- Length: 18.969 mi (30.528 km)
- Existed: 1949–present

Farm to Market Road 1382 (FM 1382) is located in Dallas County. It runs from I-35E in DeSoto to SH 180 in Grand Prairie. Most of the highway is part of Belt Line Road, becoming its own route through Cedar Hill around Joe Pool Lake. FM 1382 is one of only two farm to market roads remaining in Dallas County, the other being FM 1389.

FM 1382 begins at I-35E in DeSoto. The highway travels in a western direction through the town and enters Cedar Hill at an intersection with Duncanville Road. FM 1382 travels through a suburban area of the city and turns northwest at Belt Line Road, before running near a major retail center near US 67. Northwest of Pleasant Run Road, the highway travels near several subdivisions before taking a semi-rural route after an intersection with New Clark Road. FM 1382 then travels near the Cedar Hill campus of Northwood University and Cedar Hill State Park near the eastern shore of Joe Pool Lake. The highway travels through a mountain ridge near the state park before entering the city limits of Dallas. FM 1382 briefly travels through city, passes a few subdivisions and intersects Camp Wisdom Road before entering Grand Prairie near I-20. The highway parallels Mountain Creek from I-20 and SE 14th Street then travels near a suburban area of the city. FM 1382 ends at SH 180 near the Grand Prairie town square.

FM 1382 was designated on July 15, 1949, running from US 80 (now SH 180) in Grand Prairie southward to a road intersection at a distance of 4.8 miles (7.7 km). The highway was extended 5.8 miles (9.3 km) southeastward to a county road near Cedar Hill on October 26, 1954. FM 1382 was extended 1.5 miles (2.4 km) southeastward to Belt Line Road in Cedar Hill on October 31, 1958. The highway was extended to Desoto on November 3, 1972, and to I-35E 13 days later, replacing FM 1381. All of FM 1382 was internally redesignated as Urban Road 1382 by TxDOT on June 27, 1995. On November 15, 2018, the route was changed back to FM 1382.

Junction list

The entire road is in Dallas County.

Location	mi	km	Destinations	Notes
Lancaster–DeSoto line	0.0	0.0	I-35E (US 77) / East Belt Line Road	I-35E exit 414; southern terminus of FM 1382; continues east as Belt Line Road.
Cedar Hill	6.6	10.6	East Belt Line Road	South end of Belt Line Road overlap
Cedar Hill	7.0	11.3	US 67 (J. Elmer Weaver Freeway)	Interchange
Grand Prairie	13.5	21.7	I-20	I-20 exit 457; Belt Line Road designation begins.
Grand Prairie	16.3	26.2	Spur 303 (Pioneer Parkway) to Mountain Creek Lake Bridge	
Grand Prairie	18.9	30.4	SH 180 (Main Street) / Northeast 9th Street / Jefferson Street	Interchange; northern terminus of FM 1382; road continues north as Belt Line Road; SH 180 is former US 80
1.000 mi = 1.609 km; 1.000 km = 0.621 mi: Concurrency terminus; Route transition

== FM 1383 ==
Farm to Market Road 1383
- Location: Fayette County
- Length: 10.939 mi (17.605 km)
- Existed: November 20, 1951–present

Farm to Market Road 1383 (FM 1383) is located in Fayette County.

FM 1383 begins at an intersection with US 90 west of Weimar. The highway travels in a northern direction through rural farming areas, running through Dubina at Piano Bridge Road. FM 1383 turns west near an intersection with FM 1965. The highway runs through Ammannsville before ending at an intersection with US 77 near the town of Swiss Alp.

The current FM 1383 was designated on November 20, 1951, running from US 77 eastward to Ammannsville at a distance of 4.0 miles (6.4 km). The highway was extended eastward and southward to US 90 on November 21, 1956. On June 2, 1967, FM 1383 was extended along and west of US 77 to a county road. The 1967 extension was renumbered FM 3171 on August 5, 1968.

Junction list The entire route is in Fayette County.

Location	mi	km	Destinations	Notes
	0.0	0.0	US 90 – Schulenburg, Weimar	
	6.4	10.3	FM 1965 east	
	11.0	17.7	US 77 – Schulenburg, La Grange	
1.000 mi = 1.609 km; 1.000 km = 0.621 mi

=== FM 1383 (1949) ===
Farm to Market Road 1383
- Location: Denton County
- Existed: July 15, 1949–November 20, 1951

A previous route numbered FM 1383 was designated on July 15, 1949, from SH 121 east of Lewisville south and east 6.0 miles (9.7 km) to the Collin County line. FM 1383 was cancelled on November 20, 1951, and transferred to FM 544.

== FM 1384 ==
Farm to Market Road 1384
- Location: Denton County
- Length: 4.939 mi (7.949 km)
- Existed: 1949–present

Farm to Market Road 1384 (FM 1384) is located in Denton County.

State maintenance for FM 1384 begins at the intersection of Oliver Creek Road and A.A. Bumgarner Road near the community of Drop. The highway travels in an eastern direction then turns south at Sherman Road before turning back east. FM 1384 turns back south at Jim Baker Road before turning east near Oliver Creek. The highway continues to run in an eastward direction, ending at an intersection with FM 156 near the towns of Dish, Northlake and Justin.

FM 1384 was designated on July 15, 1949, running from FM 156 westward to Drop.

== FM 1385 ==
Farm to Market Road 1385
- Location: Denton County
- Length: 12.288 mi (19.776 km)
- Existed: 1949–present

Farm to Market Road 1385 (FM 1385) is located in Denton County.

FM 1385 begins at an intersection with US 380 in Little Elm near the Savannah subdivision. The highway travels in a northern direction near several subdivisions before beginning a more rural route near FM 428. FM 1385 has an overlap with FM 428 between Aubrey and Celina. The highway turns west at Mobberly Road, turning back to the north at Mustang Road. The highway continues running in a northern direction through rural farming areas before ending at an intersection with FM 455 near Pilot Point.

FM 1385 was designated on July 15, 1949, running from FM 427 (now FM 455) east of Pilot Point southward to Mustang at a distance of 4.8 miles (7.7 km). The highway was extended 2.5 miles (4.0 km) eastward and southward to FM 428 on May 23, 1951. On November 17, 1953, FM 1385 was extended 5.4 miles (8.7 km) to SH 24 (now US 380), absorbing FM 1170 in the process.

Junction list

The entire route is in Denton County.

Location	mi	km	Destinations	Notes
Little Elm	0.0	0.0	US 380 (University Drive) – Denton, McKinney	
	4.2	6.8	FM 428 east – Celina	South end of FM 428 overlap
	5.3	8.5	FM 428 west – Aubrey	North end of FM 428 overlap
	12.3	19.8	FM 455 – Pilot Point, Celina	
1.000 mi = 1.609 km; 1.000 km = 0.621 mi: Concurrency terminus

== FM 1386 ==
Farm to Market Road 1386
- Location: Caldwell County
- Length: 7.415 mi (11.933 km)
- Existed: October 31, 1958 (Note: FM 1386 was cancelled on March 31, 2005, but restored along the same alignment on March 26, 2009.)–present

Farm to Market Road 1386 (FM 1386) is located in Caldwell County. Its western terminus is at an intersection with FM 1322 northeast of Luling. It runs east and then north approximately 7.4 miles (11.9 km) before state maintenance ends. The roadway continues as CR 150.

The current FM 1386 was designated on October 31, 1958, from FM 1322 to CR 150. FM 1386 was cancelled on March 31, 2005, and returned to Caldwell County, but was readded to the state highway system on March 26, 2009

=== FM 1386 (1949) ===
Farm to Market Road 1386
- Location: Ellis County
- Existed: July 15, 1949–March 24, 1958

A previous route numbered FM 1386 was designated in Ellis County on July 15, 1949, from US 77 near Milford northwest 3.5 miles (5.6 km) to a county road. FM 1386 was cancelled on March 24, 1958, and transferred to FM 308.

== FM 1387 ==
Farm to Market Road 1387
- Location: Ellis County
- Length: 6.595 mi (10.614 km)
- Existed: 1949–present

Farm to Market Road 1387 (FM 1387) is located in Ellis County.

FM 1387 begins at an intersection with Bus. US 287 in Midlothian near the town square. The highway runs in a northern direction along 10th Street before turning east onto Avenue E. FM 1387 zigzags around Hawkins Spring Park near Midlothian Parkway. The highway travels near several subdivisions before ending at an intersection with FM 664.

FM 1387 was designated on July 15, 1949, running from US 67 (which became Loop 489 in 1970, but Bus. US 67 in 1990) in Midlothian northeastward at a distance of 4.0 miles (6.4 km). The highway was extended 3.2 miles (5.1 km) eastward to FM 664 on November 20, 1951. On June 30, 2006, FM 1387 was rerouted onto 10th Street in Midlothian to Bus. US 287, with the former highway being turned over to the city for maintenance. Part of Bus. US 67 was also turned over to the city for maintenance.

== FM 1388 ==
Farm to Market Road 1388
- Location: Kaufman County
- Length: 7.23 mi (11.64 km)
- Existed: 1949–present

Farm to Market 1388 (FM 1388) is located in Kaufman County.

FM 1388 begins at an intersection with FM 148 in Grays Prairie. The highway travels in a northeast direction and enters Oak Grove after crossing Kings Creek. FM 1388 runs in a more northward direction near an intersection with FM 2860 then ends at SH 34 in Kaufman.

FM 1388 was designated on July 15, 1949, running from SH 34 (now Washington Street) south of Kaufman, southward to Kings Creek at a distance of 4.1 miles (6.6 km). The highway was extended 0.5 miles (0.80 km) northward to US 175 on November 21, 1956. FM 1388 was extended 3.4 miles (5.5 km) southward to FM 148 on October 31, 1958. On September 24, 2020, the section from US 175 to SH 34 was given to the city of Kaufman.

Junction list

The entire route is in Kaufman County.

Location	mi	km	Destinations	Notes
Grays Prairie	0.0	0.0	FM 148 – Scurry, Kemp	
Oak Grove	3.9	6.3	FM 2860 east	
Kaufman	6.0	9.7	SH 34 – Ennis, Terrell	
Kaufman	6.8	10.9	Bus. SH 34 (Washington Street) – Ennis, Kaufman	
Kaufman	7.2	11.6	US 175 – Dallas, Athens	Interchange
1.000 mi = 1.609 km; 1.000 km = 0.621 mi

== FM 1389 ==
Farm to Market Road 1389
- Location: Kaufman and Dallas counties
- Length: 6.685 mi (10.758 km)
- Existed: 1949–present

Farm to Market Road 1389 (FM 1389) is located mostly in Kaufman County, with a short section in Dallas County. The highway is one of only two farm to market roads remaining in Dallas County, with FM 1382 being the other one. The curve at Combine Road is the only portion of the road within Dallas County.

FM 1389 begins at Farr-Alton Road. The highway travels in a northwestern direction, intersecting FM 3039 in Combine. FM 1389 turns to the northeast at Combine Road, then turns in a more northward direction at Martin Lane. The highway ends at a junction with US 175 in Seagoville. FM 1389 travels near the massive flood plain for the East Fork Trinity River for most of its route, most of which is owned by the John Bunker Sands Wetland Center.

FM 1389 was designated on July 15, 1949, running from US 175 southwestward to the Dallas County line at a distance of 3.5 miles (5.6 km). The highway was extended 3.9 miles (6.3 km) southeastward to a road intersection on November 21, 1956.

Junction list

County	Location	mi	km	Destinations	Notes
Kaufman	Combine	0.0	0.0	Farr-Alton Road	Southern terminus
Kaufman	Combine	1.6	2.6	FM 3089 north – Crandall	
Dallas	Combine	No major junctions			
Kaufman	Seagoville	6.7	10.8	US 175 – Kaufman	Interchange; northern terminus
1.000 mi = 1.609 km; 1.000 km = 0.621 mi

== FM 1390 ==
Farm to Market Road 1390
- Location: Kaufman County
- Length: 9.865 mi (Note: The certified length given is shorter than the actual mileage, as the Texas Department of Transportation description of FM 1390 considers it to be discontinuous at rather than concurrent with FM 148.) (15.876 km)
- Existed: 1949–present

Farm to Market Road 1390 (FM 1390) is located in Kaufman County.

FM 1390 begins at an intersection with SH 34 between Rosser and Scurry. The highway travels in a northwest direction then curves to the northeast near Warsaw Creek. FM 1390 has an overlap with FM 148 northwest of Scurry near Warsaw around a soil conservation lake. The highway continues to zigzag around property lines and small lakes and ponds, ending at a junction with US 175.

FM 1390 was designated on July 14, 1949, running from US 175 west of Kaufman to FM 148 near Warsaw at a distance of 3.5 miles (5.6 km). The highway was extended 0.68 miles (1.09 km) northward on July 1, 1954, when US 175 was rerouted. FM 1390 was extended southward to SH 34 on May 6, 1964.

Junction list

The entire route is in Kaufman County.

Location	mi	km	Destinations	Notes
	0.0	0.0	SH 34 – Ennis, Kaufman	
Warsaw	5.5	8.9	FM 148 south – Scurry	South end of FM 148 overlap
	6.7	10.8	FM 148 north – Crandall	North end of FM 148 overlap
	11.1	17.9	US 175 – Dallas, Kaufman	Interchange
1.000 mi = 1.609 km; 1.000 km = 0.621 mi: Concurrency terminus

== FM 1391 ==
Farm to Market Road 1391
- Location: Kaufman County
- Length: 6.874 mi (11.063 km)
- Existed: 1949–present

Farm to Market Road 1391 (FM 1391) is located in Kaufman County. It runs from Bus. US 175 in Kemp east 6.9 miles (11.1 km) to FM 90.

FM 1391 was designated on July 15, 1949, from FM 85 (now FM 90) north of Mabank west 3.3 miles (5.3 km) to a road intersection. On September 21, 1955, it was extended west to US 175 (later Loop 346, now Bus. US 175).

Junction list

The entire route is in Kaufman County.

Location	mi	km	Destinations	Notes
Kemp	0.0	0.0	Bus. US 175 (South Elm Street) – Kaufman, Athens	
Kemp	0.5– 0.7	0.80– 1.1	US 175 – Kaufman, Athens	Interchange
	6.9	11.1	FM 90 – Prairieville, Mabank	
1.000 mi = 1.609 km; 1.000 km = 0.621 mi

== FM 1392 ==
Farm to Market Road 1392
- Location: Kaufman County
- Length: 4.589 mi (7.385 km)
- Existed: 1949–present

Farm to Market Road 1392 (FM 1392) is located in Kaufman County.

FM 1392 begins at an intersection with US 80 in Lawrence. The highway travels in a northern direction, turning northwest at County Road 237, then turns northeast at County Road 239. FM 1392 continues to run in a northeast direction, ending at an intersection with SH 205.

FM 1392 was designated on July 15, 1949, running from US 80 at Lawrence northward to what is now FM 598 at a distance of 3.7 miles (6.0 km). The highway was extended 1.0 mile (1.6 km) to SH 205 on October 26, 1954.

== FM 1393 ==
Farm to Market Road 1393
- Location: Navarro County
- Length: 7.327 mi (11.792 km)
- Existed: 1949–present

Farm to Market Road 1393 (FM 1393) is located entirely within Navarro County.

FM 1393 was designated in 1949, running from SH 31 east of Powell to SH 309 south of Goodlow.

The entire route is in Navarro County.

Location	mi	km	Destinations	Notes
	0.0	0.0	SH 309	
	4.9	7.9	FM 633 north – Powell	
	7.3	11.7	SH 31 – Corsicana, Athens	
1.000 mi = 1.609 km; 1.000 km = 0.621 mi

== FM 1394 ==
Farm to Market Road 1394
- Location: Navarro, Freestone, and Limestone counties
- Length: 12.613 mi (20.299 km)
- Existed: 1949–present

Farm to Market Road 1394 (FM 1394) is located in Navarro, Freestone, and Limestone counties.

FM 1394 was designated in 1949, running from SH 14 in Richland southwest to a road intersection at a distance of 5.0 miles (8.0 km). In 1956, the highway was extended 3.2 miles (5.1 km) to the end of FM 641. FM 1394 was extended 3.5 miles (5.6 km) to the Navarro–Freestone county line in 1958. The highway was extended 0.4 miles (0.64 km) to FM 27 in 1962. In 1965, FM 1394 was extended 0.4 miles (0.64 km) northeastward to I-45, completing the current route.

Junction list

County	Location	mi	km	Destinations	Notes
Limestone		0.0	0.0	FM 27 to SH 171 – Wortham	
Freestone	No major junctions				
Navarro		3.6	5.8	FM 641 east to SH 14	
Navarro		7.2	11.6	FM 3194 north to FM 709	
Navarro	Richland	12.0	19.3	SH 14 – Corsicana, Mexia	
Navarro	Richland	12.6	20.3	I-45 – Corsicana, Streetman	I-45 exit 218
1.000 mi = 1.609 km; 1.000 km = 0.621 mi

== FM 1395 ==
Farm to Market Road 1395
- Location: Van Zandt County
- Length: 6.934 mi (11.159 km)
- Existed: October 31, 1958–present

Farm to Market Road 1395 (FM 1395) is located in Van Zandt County.

FM 1395 begins at an intersection with FM 859 north of Edgewood. The highway travels in a northwestern direction, ending at an intersection with FM 47 near Lake Tawakoni.

The current FM 1395 was designated on October 31, 1958, on the current route.

=== FM 1395 (1949) ===
Farm to Market Road 1395
- Location: Rockwall County
- Existed: July 15, 1949–November 4, 1955

A previous route numbered FM 1395 was designated on July 15, 1949, from FM 549 west 1.2 miles (1.9 km) to a county road. FM 1395 was cancelled on November 4, 1955, and transferred to FM 1143 (now SH 276).

== FM 1396 ==
Farm to Market Road 1396
- Location: Fannin County
- Length: 20.817 mi (33.502 km)
- Existed: June 23, 1953–present

Farm to Market Road 1396 (FM 1396) is located in Fannin County.

FM 1396 begins at an intersection with SH 78 north of Bonham. The highway travels in an eastern direction and intersects FM 273 north of Lake Bonham. FM 1396 turns south near County Road 2700, runs through Allens Chapel, then intersects US 82 in western Honey Grove. The highway runs through rural, undeveloped areas of the town before ending at an intersection with SH 56.

The current FM 1396 was designated on June 23, 1953, running from US 82 (now SH 56) west of Honey Grove to a road intersection northwest of Bois D'Arc Creek at a total distance of 10.1 miles (16.3 km). The highway was extended 10.0 miles (16.1 km) westward to FM 273 on August 24, 1955. On January 29, 2004, FM 1396 was extended to SH 78 over an old alignment of FM 273 when that highway was rerouted.

Junction list

The entire route is in Fannin County.

Location	mi	km	Destinations	Notes
	0.0	0.0	SH 78 – Durant, Bonham	
	2.2	3.5	FM 273 – Ivanhoe, Lake Bonham	
	9.6	15.4	FM 2029 north – Telephone	
Honey Grove	19.6	31.5	US 82 – Paris, Bonham	
Honey Grove	20.8	33.5	SH 56 – Honey Grove, Dodd City	
1.000 mi = 1.609 km; 1.000 km = 0.621 mi

=== FM 1396 (1949) ===
Farm to Market Road 1396
- Location: Rockwall County
- Existed: July 15, 1949–February 26, 1953

A previous route numbered FM 1396 was designated on July 15, 1949, from US 67 (now concurrent with I-30) in Royse City east 2.1 miles (3.4 km) to the Hunt County line. FM 1396 was cancelled on February 26, 1953, and transferred to FM 35.

== FM 1397 ==
Farm to Market Road 1397
- Location: Bowie County
- Length: 11.458 mi (18.440 km)
- Existed: 1949–present

Farm to Market Road 1397 (FM 1397) is located in Bowie County.

FM 1397 begins at a junction with I-30/US 59 and SH 93 in Texarkana. The highway travels in a northern direction along Summerhill Road through a commercial and residential area of the city, leaving Texarkana near Shiling Road. After leaving Texarkana, FM 1397 travels through rural farming areas then turns to the west at an intersection with County Road 2320. The highway starts to run in a more southward direction near Diversion Canal then ends at an intersection with FM 559 in Wamba.

FM 1397 was designated on July 14, 1949, running from FM 559 (Richmond Road) near downtown Texarkana northward to Cross Road at a distance of 8.6 miles (13.8 km). The highway was slightly rerouted in Texarkana on December 19, 1950, decreasing the route's length by 0.33 miles (0.53 km). on September 27, 1960, FM 1397 was extended 5.5 miles (8.9 km) northward, westward and southward to FM 559 at Wamba. The highway's southern terminus was relocated to I-30 on August 31, 1967, with the old section of FM 1397 south of the interstate being transferred to SH 93.

Junction list

The entire route is in Bowie County.

Location	mi	km	Destinations	Notes
Texarkana	0.0	0.0	I-30 / US 59 – Dallas, Little Rock SH 93 south (Summerhill Road)	I-30 exit 222
Texarkana	0.4	0.64	FM 2240 west (Moores Lane)	
Wamba	11.5	18.5	FM 559	
1.000 mi = 1.609 km; 1.000 km = 0.621 mi

== FM 1398 ==
Farm to Market Road 1398
- Location: Bowie County
- Length: 10.484 mi (16.872 km)
- Existed: 1949–present

Farm to Market Road 1398 (FM 1398) is located in Bowie County.

FM 1398 begins at an intersection with US 82 in Hooks. The highway travels in a northern direction through a residential area, leaving the town after crossing under I-30 without any direct connection. North of Hooks, FM 1398 runs through more rural areas, then turns east at an intersection with County Roads 2109 / 2212 in Red Bank. The highway turns south east of Barkman, continuing to run south towards the town of Leary. FM 1398 crosses I-30 for a second time before ending at an intersection with US 82 in Leary.

FM 1398 was designated on July 15, 1949, running from US 82 at Hooks northward to Red Bank at a distance of 4.4 miles (7.1 km). On May 23, 1951, the highway was extended 6.5 miles (10.5 km) eastward and southward of Red Bank to US 82 west of Leary.

== FM 1399 ==
Farm to Market Road 1399
- Location: Cass County
- Length: 15.694 mi (25.257 km)
- Existed: 1949–present

Farm to Market Road 1399 (FM 1399) is located entirely within Cass County.

FM 1399 was designated in 1949, running from SH 11 (now SH 8) in Linden to FM 250 in Marietta at a distance of 16.6 miles (26.7 km). In 1964, the highway's southern terminus was re-located when SH 8 was re-rerouted through Linden, with the old section of FM 1399 being relinquished to the city of Linden.

Junction list

The entire route is in Cass County.

Location	mi	km	Destinations	Notes
Linden	0.0	0.0	SH 8	
	7.4	11.9	FM 995	
Marietta	15.7	25.3	FM 250 (Central Avenue)	
1.000 mi = 1.609 km; 1.000 km = 0.621 mi
