= English, Red River County, Texas =

Unincorporated community in Texas, US

Coordinates: 33°37′39″N 94°51′34″W

English is an unincorporated community in northeastern Red River County, Texas, United States. It is 11 miles (18 km) northeast of Clarksville.

English was named after Oliver English and Simeon English, Oliver English's uncle. Oliver English bought land on what is now English in 1840. In 1852, Simeon English brought three families and thirty slaves to the area to establish plantations. In 1910, English had a reported population of 100. From 1920 to 2000, English had approximately 92 residents.
