= Pledger, Texas =

Unincorporated community in Texas, US

Coordinates: 29°10′57″N 95°54′31″W

Pledger is an unincorporated community in Matagorda County, Texas, United States. Pledger has a post office, with the ZIP code 77468.

== Gallery ==
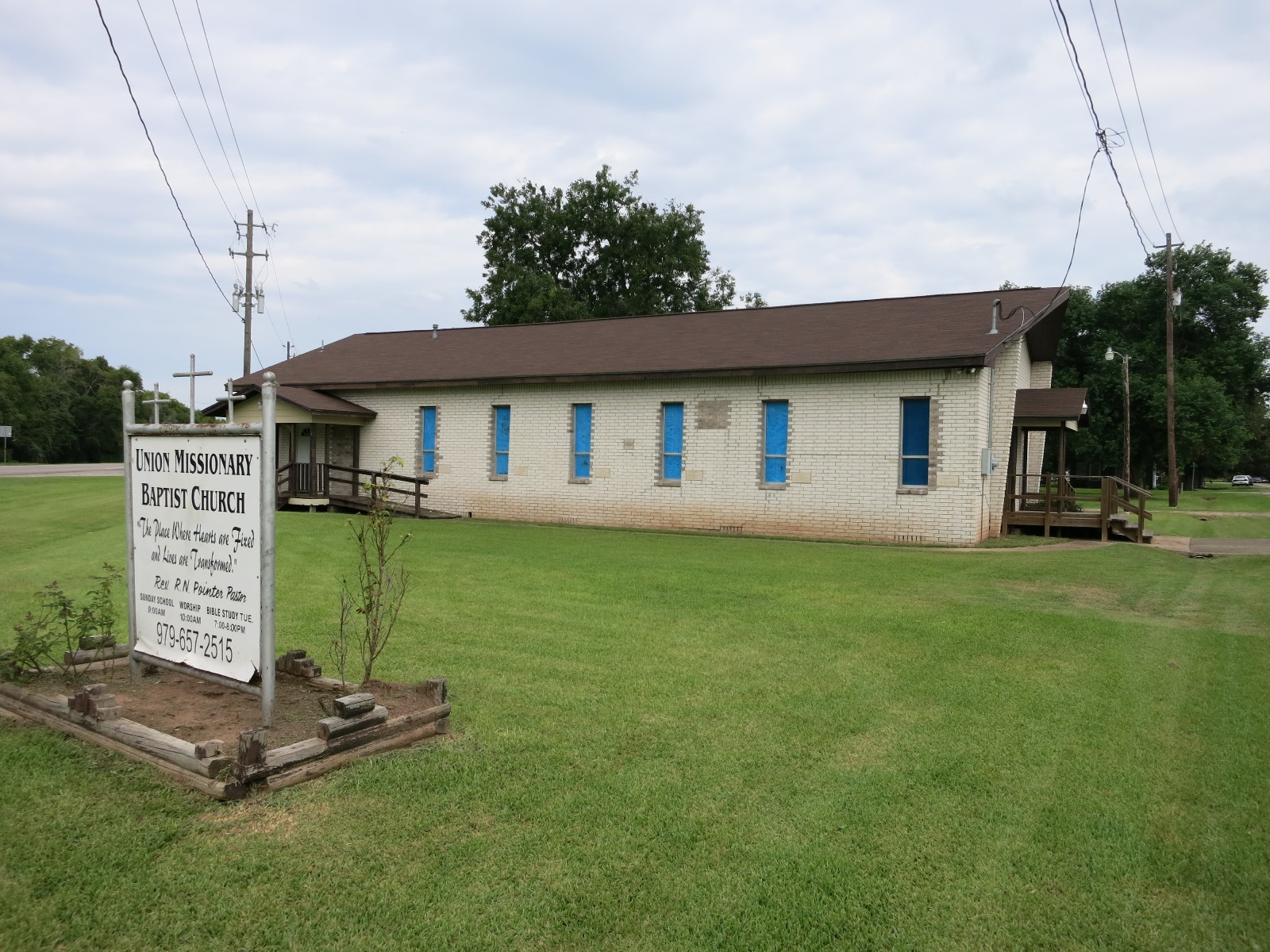
Union Missionary Baptist Church is located near the junction of FM 1301 and FM 1728.

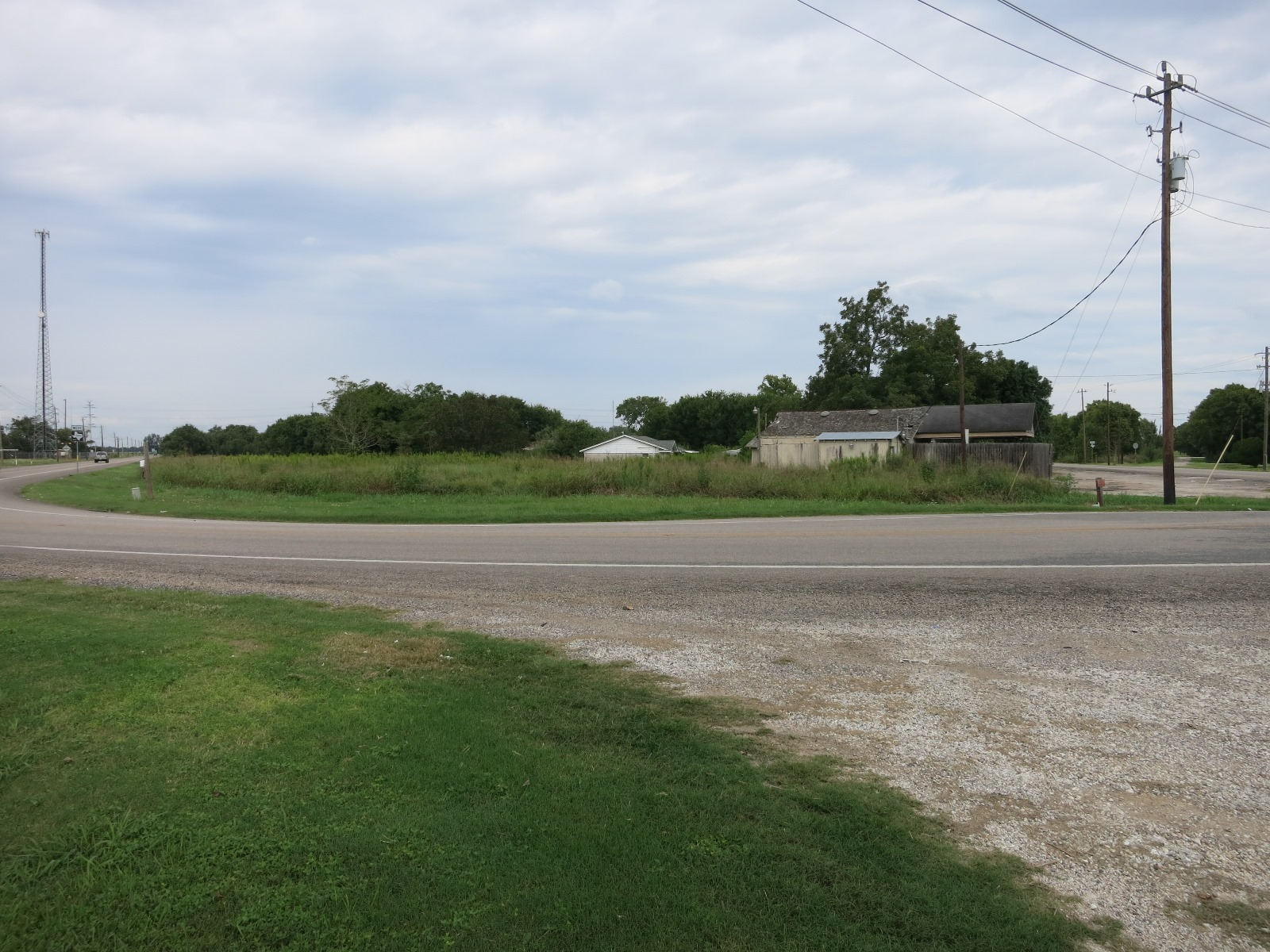
Looking north, FM 1301 can be seen at both the right and left side of the photo at the hairpin turn.

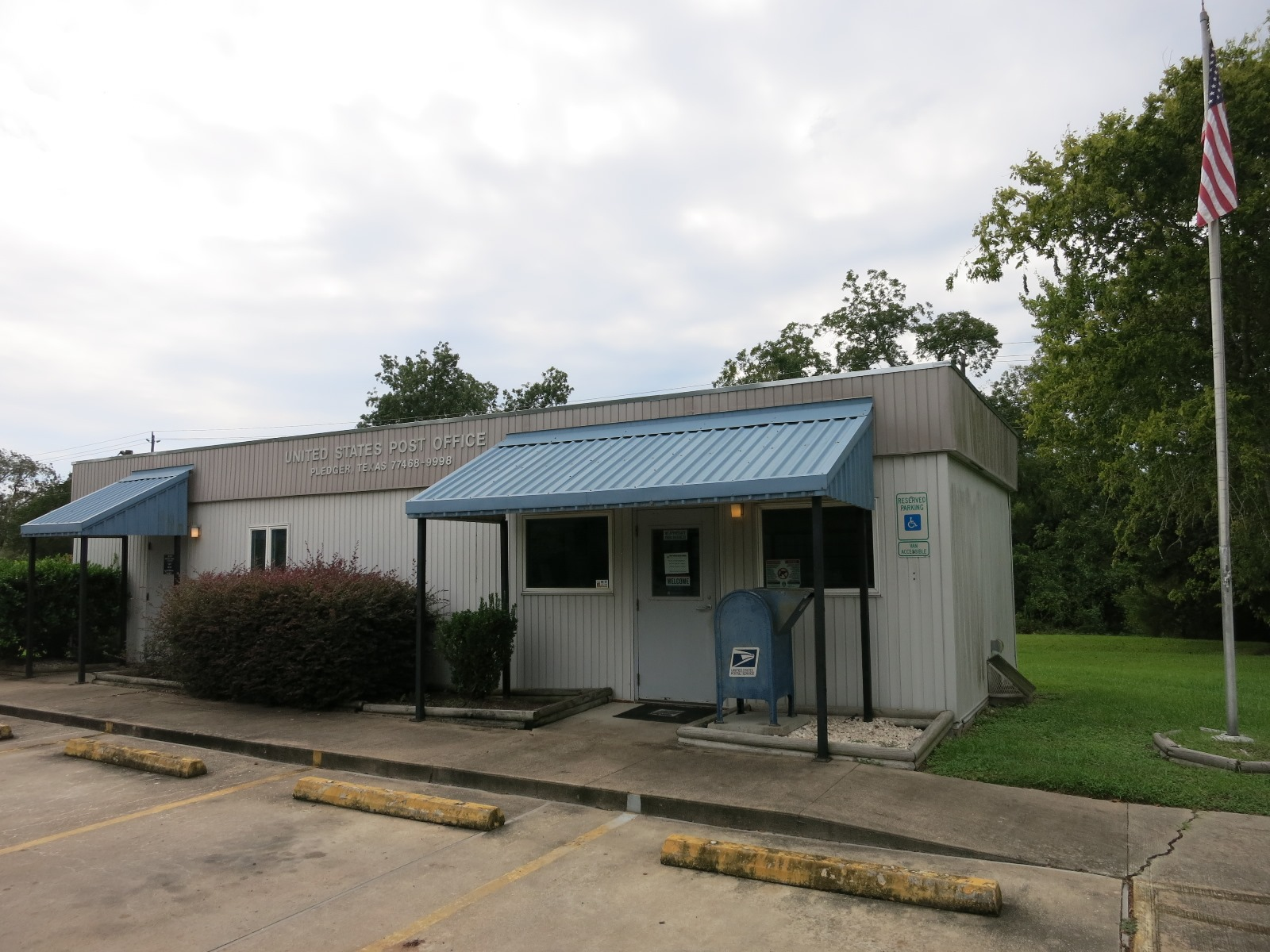
Pledger has its own US Post Office at 9463 FM 1728 Road with zip code 77468.

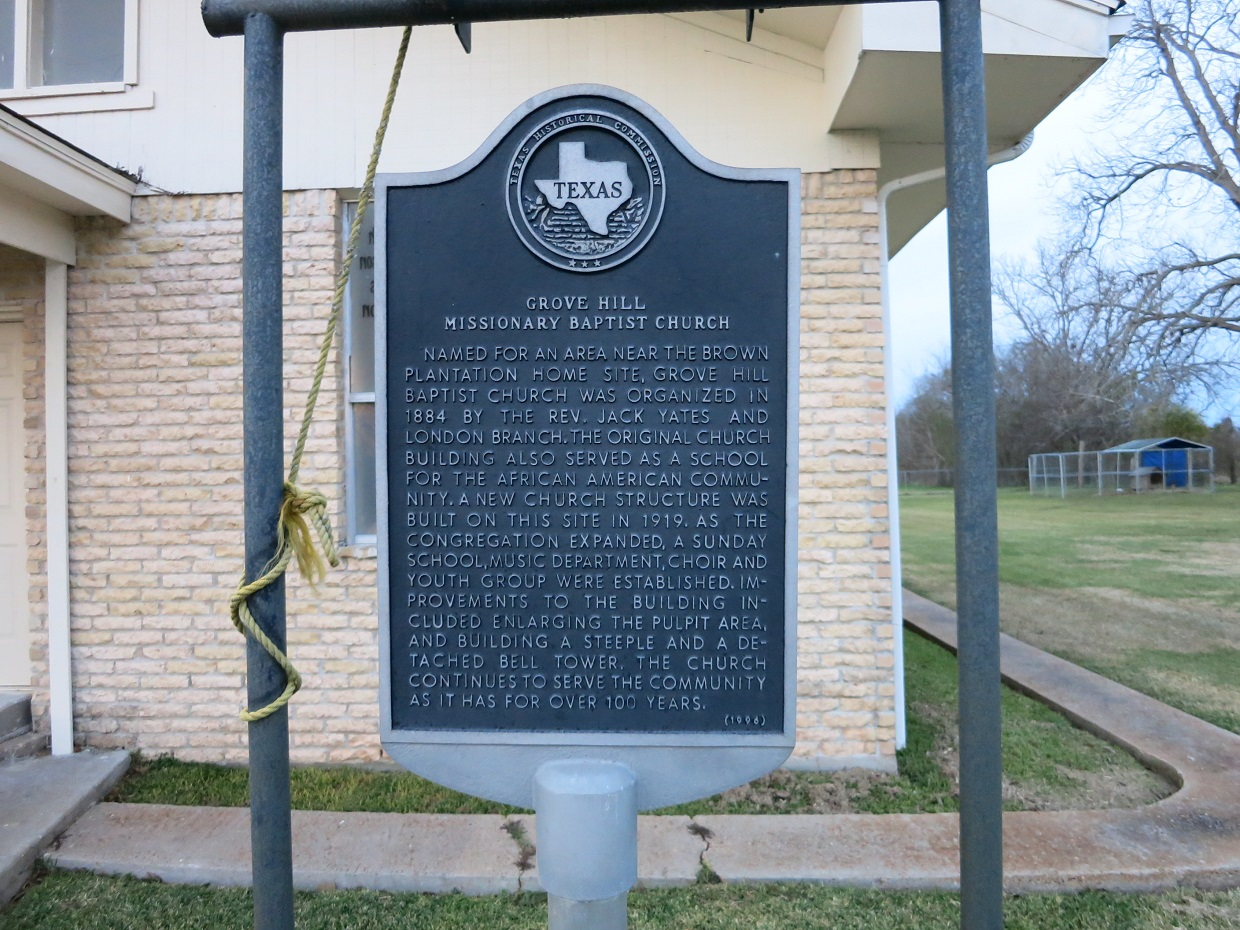
Grove Hill Missionary Baptist Church has a Texas Historical Commission marker.
