= Bagwell, Texas =

Unincorporated community in Texas, US

Bagwell
- Unincorporated community
- Location in Texas
- Coordinates: 33.6620531°N 95.1607811°W
- Country: United States
- State: Texas
- County: Red River
- Elevation: 476 ft (145 m)

Bagwell is an unincorporated community in Red River County, Texas, United States. Bagwell has a post office, with the ZIP code 75412. The population in Bagwell (zip 75412) is 528.

Situated on Farm to Market Roads 2120 and 2573, it was named for local resident Milas Bagwell. In 1876, the Texas and Pacific Railway was opened in Bagwell. A post office was opened by 1876, when nearby Robbinsville had its post office consolidated with the one here. It continued growth and peaked in the late 1920s, with a population of 400. The town declined from the construction of U.S. Route 82 by 1961, and by 2000, had 150 residents, the same as in 1990.
