= Speaks, Texas =

- Unincorporated area
- Location in Texas Location in the United States
- Coordinates: 29°15′20″N 96°42′01″W
- Country: United States
- State: Texas
- County: Lavaca
- Elevation: 144 ft (44 m)
- Time zone: UTC-6 (Central (CST))
  - Summer (DST): UTC-5 (CDT)
- ZIP code: 77964
- Area code: 979
- GNIS feature ID: 1380579

Speaks is an unincorporated area in southeast Lavaca County in the U.S. state of Texas. It is located on Farm to Market Road 530 (FM 530) southeast of the county seat at Hallettsville. In 1866 the settlement was known as Speaksville. Ten years later the name was changed to Boxville. The name was altered to Speaks when a post office opened in 1928. Since 1950 the community's population has hovered between 50 and 60.

== Geography ==
Speaks is situated on FM 530 a distance of 23 miles (37 km) southeast of Hallettsville. The Navidad River flows south a short distance to the west of Speaks.

== History ==
In 1828, the Mexican government granted Old Three Hundred settler Jesse H. Cartwright a small parcel of land on the east bank of the Navidad near the main Atascosito Road. In 1835, Archibald S. White accepted a larger grant that enclosed Cartwright's property and encompassed the area of Speaks. By 1866, a post office opened in the settlement, which was called Speaksville after the proprietor of the only store. In 1876, the community's name was changed to Boxville. The post office closed in 1882. The town revived, and in 1928, the post office reopened under the name of Speaks when J. W. Koonce opened a new store. The Speaks oil field and the Seclusion gas field were established in the area. In 1950, there were two stores and the Speaks Community Church serving 50 residents. The church, post office, and store were still open in 1987. Between that year and 2000, the area population remained at approximately 60.
