= Albion, Texas =

Albion
- Unincorporated place
- Location within the state of Texas Albion (the United States)
- Coordinates: 33°51′33″N 95°01′51″W
- Country: United States
- State: Texas
- County: Red River
- Elevation: 384 ft (117 m)

Population (2000)
  - Total: Unknown. Possibly 6 - 22
- Time zone: UTC-6 (Central (CST))
  - Summer (DST): UTC-5 (CDT)
- GNIS feature ID: 1379328

Albion is an unincorporated community in Red River County, Texas, United States. It is located along the Red River where SH 37 crosses it.

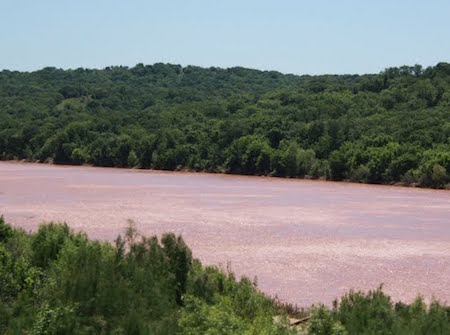
Red River, Texas
