= Wamba, Texas =

- Unincorporated community
- Location within Texas Location within the United States
- Coordinates: 33°30′21″N 94°07′44″W
- Country: United States
- State: Texas
- County: Bowie
- Elevation: 354 ft (108 m)
- Time zone: UTC-6 (Central (CST))
  - Summer (DST): UTC-5 (CDT)
- Area codes: 430 & 903
- GNIS feature ID: 1370842

Wamba is an unincorporated community in Bowie County, Texas, United States. According to the Handbook of Texas, the community had a population of 70 in 2000. It is located within the Texarkana metropolitan area.

== History ==
The Wamba area was first inhabited by squatters around the 1830s, but the community itself was not settled until 20 years later. A post office was established at Wamba in 1897 and remained in operation until 1916, with Laurel B. Fort as postmaster. Its population was 50 in 1910, 40 in 1940, and 70 from 1982 through 2000 with no businesses. It was the site of a water tower built by Clyde Burns.

== Geography ==
Wamba is located near the Red River, 5 miles (8.0 km) northwest of Texarkana in eastern Bowie County. It is on Farm to Market Road 559, a few miles north of Interstate 30 and is the northeasternmost town in Texas.

== Education ==
Wamba is served by the Pleasant Grove Independent School District.
