= Spring Hill, Bowie County, Texas =

- Unincorporated community
- Location within Texas Location within the United States
- Coordinates: 33°36′16″N 94°40′17″W
- Country: United States
- State: Texas
- County: Bowie
- Elevation: 374 ft (114 m)
- Time zone: UTC-6 (Central (CST))
  - Summer (DST): UTC-5 (CDT)
- ZIP Code: 75559
- Area codes: 903 & 430
- GNIS feature ID: 1380587

Spring Hill is an unincorporated community in Bowie County, Texas, United States. According to the Handbook of Texas, the community had a population of 209 in 2000. It is located within the Texarkana metropolitan area.

== History ==
In the 1930s, the town reported a population of ten and two rated businesses. In 1945, it had one business and a population of forty. In 1984, Spring Hill had a sawmill, two churches, and a cemetery. In 1990, the population was 209. The population remained the same in 2000.

== Geography ==
Spring Hill is situated along U.S. Highway 259, 7 mi (11 km) north of De Kalb in northwestern Bowie County.

== Education ==
Spring Hill had its own school in 1984. Today, the community is served by the DeKalb Independent School District.
