= Timeline of 's-Hertogenbosch =

The following is a timeline of the history of the municipality of 's-Hertogenbosch, Netherlands.

== Prior to 19th century ==
- 1185 – City rights granted.
- 1225 – Wall of 's-Hertogenbosch built, with its Brussels Gate and Leuven Gate.
- 1268 – Tafel van de Heilige Geest (charity) active (approximate date).
- 1399 – Vughter Poort (gate) built.
- 1400 – Public clock installed (approximate date).
- 1463 – Catastrophic fire, likely witnessed by young Hieronymus Bosch.
- 1495 – Artist Hieronymus Bosch active (approximate date).
- 1530 – St. John's Cathedral ('s-Hertogenbosch) built.
- 1533 – Stadhuis van 's-Hertogenbosch (city hall) remodelled.
- 1559 – Roman Catholic Diocese of 's-Hertogenbosch established.
- 1601 – November: Siege of 's-Hertogenbosch (1601).
- 1620 – Kruithuis ('s-Hertogenbosch) built.
- 1629 – April–September: Siege of 's-Hertogenbosch.
- 1638 – St. John's Cathedral organ installed.
- 1645 – Citadel of 's-Hertogenbosch built.
- 1749 – Parade grounds, 's-Hertogenbosch laid out.

== 19th century ==
- 1815 – City becomes capital of North Brabant province.
- 1817 – Design of 's-Hertogenbosch coat of arms adopted.
- 1818 – De Gruyter (chain store) in business.
- 1824 – Bossche Synagogue in use.
- 1826 – Geefhuis (charity) rebuilt on Hinthamerstraat.
- 1829 – Catholic Nord Brabanter newspaper begins publication.
- 1836 – Provinciaal Genootschap Kunsten & Wetenschappen (society of arts & sciences) founded.
- 1853 – Theatre built on the Papenhulst.
- 1866 – Population: 24,201.
- 1868 – 's-Hertogenbosch railway station opens.
- 1874 – 's-Hertogenbosch fortifications dismantled.
- 1880 – Brabant Historical Information Center headquartered in city.
- 1881 – Kruisstraat railway station and Sprokkelbosch railway station open.
- 1883
  - 's-Hertogenbosch-Helmond tram line begins operating.
  - Rijksarchief Noord-Brabant building constructed on Waterstraat.
- 1884 – Petrus Josephus Johannus Sophia Marie van der Does de Willebois becomes mayor.
- 1885 – 700th anniversary of city founding.
- 1886 – Telephone begins operating.
- 1887 – City gasworks built on the Vughterweg.
- 1895 – Wilhelmina of the Netherlands and regent queen Emma visit city.
- 1896 – 's-Hertogenbosch-Heusden tram line begins operating.

== 20th century ==
- 1903 – Dragon Fountain, 's-Hertogenbosch installed.
- 1905 – Nieuwe Sint-Jacobskerk (church) built.
- 1917 – St. Catherine's Church, 's-Hertogenbosch (church) built.
- 1919 – Population: 38,067.
- 1925 – Centraal Noordbrabants Museum opens on Bethaniëstraat.
- 1926 – Sportpark De Hooge Donken opens.
- 1929 – Bosch monument erected in the Markt ('s-Hertogenbosch).
- 1934 – Casino Theatre, 's-Hertogenbosch built.
- 1938 – Synagogue built on Prins Bernhardstraat.
- 1943
  - January: Herzogenbusch concentration camp begins operating near city.
  - December: Subcamp of the Herzogenbusch concentration camp established.
- 1944
  - September: Subcamp of the Herzogenbusch concentration camp dissolved.
  - 27 October: Allied forces take city.
- 1954 – International Vocal Competition 's-Hertogenbosch begins.
- 1957 – Sligro supermarket in business (approximate date).
- 1959 – Brabants Dagblad (newspaper) in publication.
- 1971
  - Empel en Meerwijk and Engelen become part of 's-Hertogenbosch.
  - Provinciehuis (Noord-Brabant) built.
- 1973 – Saint Leonard's Church, 's-Hertogenbosch demolished in the Koningin Emmaplein ('s-Hertogenbosch).
- 1981 – Rosmalen railway station opens.
- 1985 – May: Catholic pope visits city.
- 1987 – 's-Hertogenbosch Oost railway station opens.
- 1996
  - June: 1996 Tour de France cycling race starts from 's-Hertogenbosch.
  - Boschtion radio begins broadcasting.
  - Ton Rombouts becomes mayor.
- 2000 – Population: 129,034 municipality.

== 21st century ==
- 2005 – Brabants Historisch Informatie Centrum established.
- 2013 – Population: 142,817 municipality.

== See also ==
- 's-Hertogenbosch history
- History of 's-Hertogenbosch
- List of mayors of 's-Hertogenbosch
- List of governors of 's-Hertogenbosch, 1567-1794
- List of rijksmonuments in 's-Hertogenbosch
- Other names of 's-Hertogenbosch e.g. Bois-le-Duc, Den Bosch
- Timelines of other municipalities in the Netherlands: Amsterdam, Breda, Delft, Eindhoven, Groningen, Haarlem, The Hague, Leiden, Maastricht, Nijmegen, Rotterdam, Utrecht

== Bibliography ==
in English

- Abraham Rees (1819), "Bois-le-duc", The Cyclopaedia, London: Longman, Hurst, Rees, Orme & Brown, hdl:2027/uc2.ark:/13960/t4zg6ww3j
- William Henry Overall, ed. (1870). "Bois-le-Duc, Netherlands". Dictionary of Chronology. London: William Tegg. hdl:2027/uc2.ark:/13960/t9m32q949.
- "'s Hertogenbosch", Handbook for Travellers in Holland and Belgium (20th ed.), London: John Murray, 1881, hdl:2027/hvd.hn2ha2
- "Bois-le-Duc". Chambers's Encyclopaedia. London. 1901. hdl:2027/uc2.ark:/13960/t81j9pj6k.
- "'S Hertogenbosch", Belgium and Holland (15th ed.), Leipzig: Karl Baedeker, 1910, hdl:2027/uc1.b3129294
- "'s Hertogenbosch" . Encyclopædia Britannica. Vol. 24 (11th ed.). 1911. pp. 872–873.
- Benjamin Vincent (1910), "Bois-le-Duc, Dutch Brabant", Haydn's Dictionary of Dates (25th ed.), London: Ward, Lock & Co., hdl:2027/uc2.ark:/13960/t41r6xh8t
- Colum Hourihane, ed. (2012). "'s-Hertogenbosch". Grove Encyclopedia of Medieval Art and Architecture. Oxford University Press. ISBN 978-0-19-539536-5.

in Dutch

- Jacob van Oudenhoven (1670). Silva-ducis aucta & renata of een nieuwe ende gantsch vermeerderde beschrijvinge van de stadt van s'Hertogen-Bossche (in Dutch). Scheffers, Jan & Oudenhoven, Jacomina van (widow of Isaac van Dockum) – via Internet Archive.
- Johan Hendrik van Heurn (1776). Historie der Stad en Meyjerye van 's Hertogenbosch (in Dutch). Utrecth: J. Van Schoonhoven en Comp. – via Google Books. 1776-1778
- Abraham Jacob van der Aa (1845). "Hertogenbosch". Aardrijkskundig woordenboek der Nederlanden [Geographical dictionary of the Netherlands] (in Dutch). Vol. 5. Gorinchem: Jacobus Noorduyn. hdl:2027/hvd.32044105228076 – via HathiTrust.
- R.A. Van Zuijlen Jr. (ed.). Inventaris der archieven van de stad 's Hertogenbosch (in Dutch). 's Hertogenbosch: W.C. Van Heusden. 1863-1866
- G. van Herwijnen, ed. (1978). "Noord-Brabant: 's-Hertogenbosch". Bibliografie van de stedengeschiedenis van Nederland [Bibliography of Urban History in the Netherlands] (in Dutch). Brill. pp. 288–296. ISBN 90-04-05700-5.
