= Frank A. Ludewig =

Dutch architect

- Born: Franciscus Adrianus Ludewig; 22 October 1863; Beverwijk, Netherlands
- Died: 16 September 1940 (aged 76); Grand Rapids, Michigan, US
- Occupation: Architect

Franciscus Adrianus "Frank" Ludewig (22 October 1863 – 16 September 1940) was a Dutch architect who lived and worked mostly in the United States. He is primarily known for his church architecture. Two of the buildings which he designed are on the National Register of Historic Places.

== Life and career ==
Ludewig was born in Beverwijk, Netherlands, and studied architecture at the Polytechnical Institute in Delft where he befriended another future architect, Jacobus van Gils, whose sister Dorothea he married in 1896. The couple had two children, James W. Ludewig and Frank M. Ludewig.

After graduation, Ludewig worked at the Amsterdam office of architect P.J.H. Cuypers, probably as a draftsman. In 1902 he began his own office in Arnhem and moved two years later to Nijmegen. He built several houses, reconstructed Wijchen castle and restored churches in Beek, Leur and Rosmalen. In 1912 he migrated to the United States, hoping to find opportunities to design churches. He set up an architectural office in St. Louis, Missouri and later moved to Holland, Michigan. In the nineteen years of his American career, Ludewig built 21 churches and chapels, 11 schools and 10 presbyteries. His most important work, and one of his last, was the Pontifical College Josephinum in Columbus, Ohio. Ludewig retired at the age of 69 and, after suffering from heart ailment for 18 months, died in Grand Rapids, Michigan in 1940.

== Selected works ==
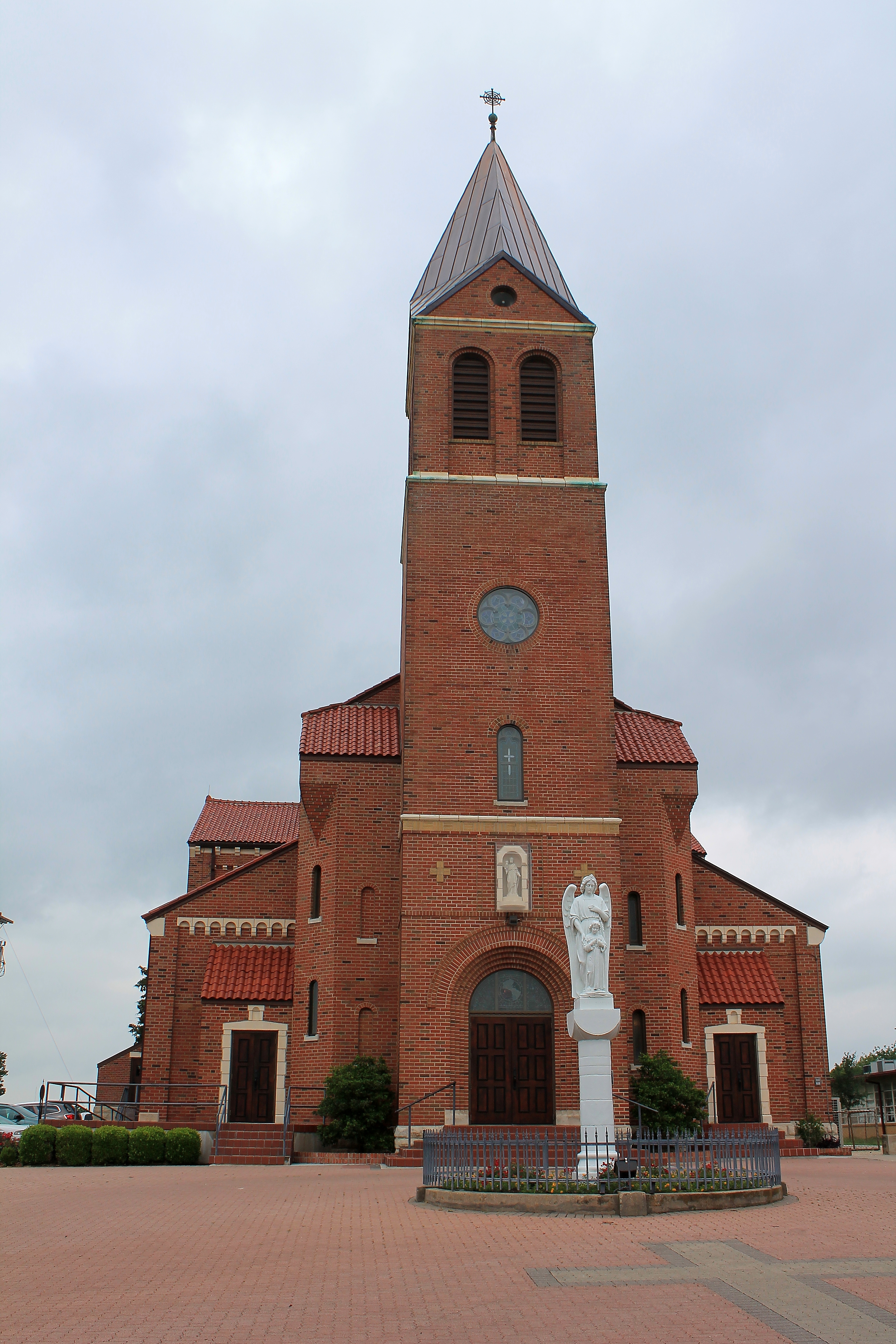
St. Peter's Church in Lindsay, Texas, designed by Ludewig in 1917

- 1902 Zutphen, Netherlands: presbytery
- 1902 Zutphen, Netherlands: gate-house for a Catholic cemetery
- 1905–1909 Beek, Netherlands: restoration of the Reformed church, construction of new apse and consistory
- 1906 Wijchen, Netherlands: restoration of the castle
- 1910–1911 Leur, Netherlands: restoration of the Reformed church
- 1911 Rosmalen, Netherlands: extension of the Catholic St. Lambert's church
- 1914 Westwoods, Illinois: Church of the Presentation of the Blessed Virgin Mary
- 1917–1918 Lindsay, Texas: St. Peter's Church
- 1922-1924 Covington, Kentucky: St. John the Evangelist church
- 1924 St. Louis, Missouri : St. Aloysius church
- 1926 St. Louis, Missouri: Holy Family church
- 1927–1928 Columbus, Ohio, St. Aloysius church
- 1927–1931 Columbus, Ohio : Pontifical College Josephinum
- 1930 Louisville, Kentucky: The Cumberland (apartment building)
- Year unknown Raymond, Illinois: St. Raymond church
- Year unknown Conway, Arkansas: St. Joseph church
- 1925 Muenster, Texas: Sacred Heart School
