= Markt, Rosmalen =

Street in Rosmalen, the Netherlands

Coordinates: 51°43′05″N 05°21′49″E

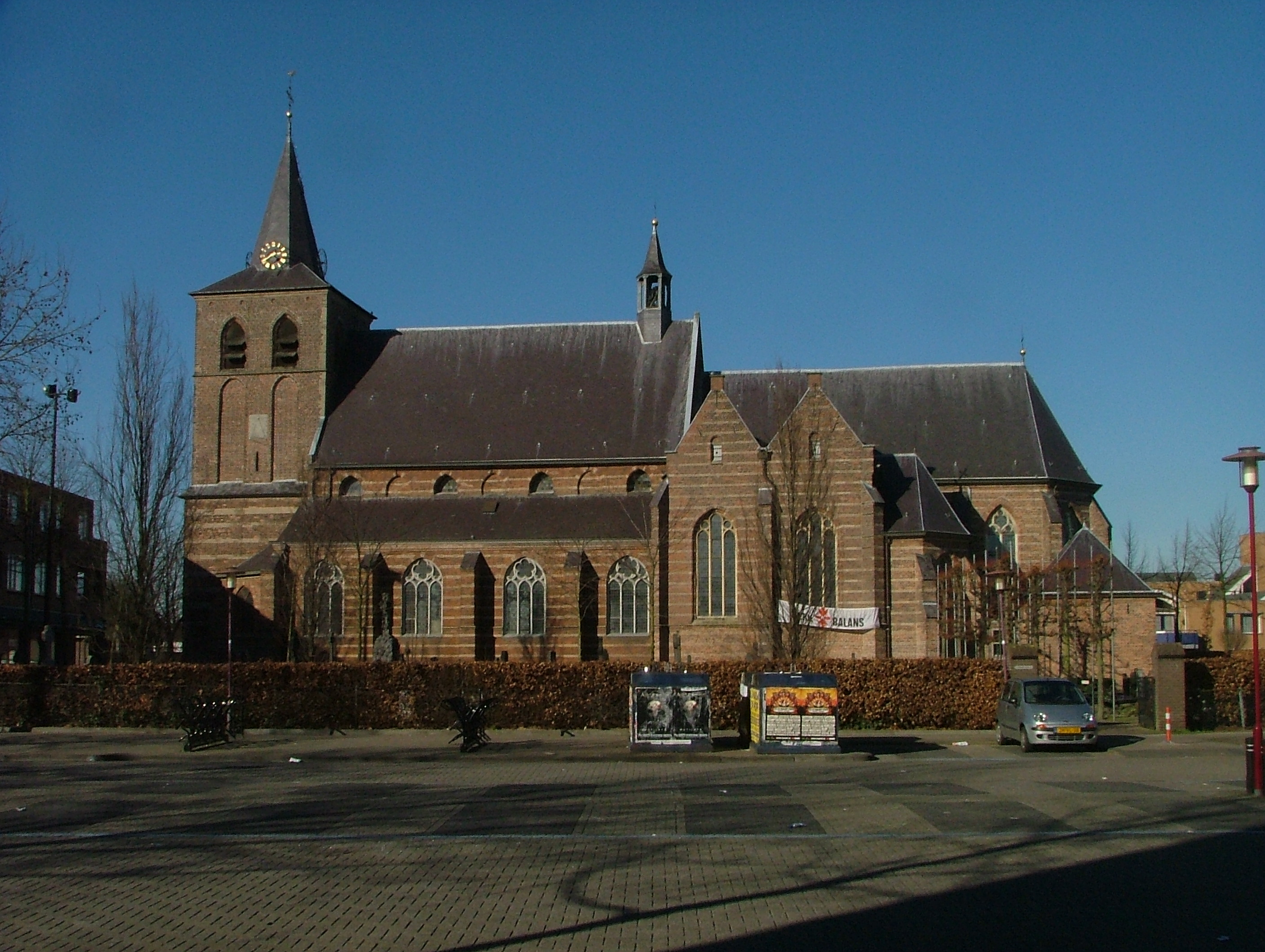
Saint Lambertchurch in Rosmalen.

Markt is the name of a Square in Rosmalen, North Brabant, Netherlands. It used to be the garden of a rectory until 1911.

The name is given to the square, because the Street market was held on this square. Until 1981 there were two graves of Canadian soldiers who rode their motorcycle over a mine near Sprokkelbosch during World War II. Because people didn't know for sure if they are Catholic or not, they are buried outside the church's graveyard

The Saint Lambertchurch is located next to the square.
