= Rosmalen Noord =

Coordinates: 51°42′59″N 5°21′51″E

Rosmalen Noord is a borough in the municipality of 's-Hertogenbosch, the capital of North Brabant. It's located in the north of Rosmalen, north of railway track Tilburg - Nijmegen, south of De Groote Wielen, east of the Rijksweg 2, the highway from Maastricht to Amsterdam.

Rosmalen Noord is 1503 hectare big and counts over 13.600 citizens. Rosmalen Noord is situated on several slopes, so the town of Rosmalen kept dry when the river Meuse flooded.

In Rosmalen Noord can the following neighbourhoods be found:

1. . 't Ven
2. . Rosmalen centrum
3. . Hondsberg
4. . Kruisstraat
5. . Bedrijventerrein Kruisstraat
6. . Overlaet
7. . A2-zone Rosmalen Noord
8. . Rosmalense polder
9. . Kattenbosch
