= National Register of Historic Places listings in Cooke County, Texas =

Location of Cooke County in Texas

This is a list of the National Register of Historic Places listings in Cooke County, Texas.

This is intended to be a complete list of properties and districts listed on the National Register of Historic Places in Cooke County, Texas. There are one district and seven individual properties listed on the National Register in the county. Five individually listed properties are Recorded Texas Historic Landmarks including one State Antiquities Landmark. The district includes an additional Recorded Texas Historic Landmark.

This National Park Service list is complete through NPS recent listings posted March 21, 2025.

== Current listings ==
The locations of National Register properties and districts may be seen in a mapping service provided.

	Name on the Register	Image	Date listed	Location	City or town	Description
1	E.P. and Alice Bomar House	E.P. and Alice Bomar House	February 25, 2004 (#04000099)	417 S. Denton St. 33°37′15″N 97°08′34″W	Gainesville	
2	Cloud-Stark House	Cloud-Stark House	June 1, 1982 (#82004498)	327 S. Dixon St. 33°37′19″N 97°08′44″W	Gainesville	
3	Cooke County Courthouse	Cooke County Courthouse	March 22, 1991 (#91000336)	Public Square, bounded by California, Dixon, Main and Commerce Sts. 33°37′26″N 97°08′44″W	Gainesville	State Antiquities Landmark, Recorded Texas Historic Landmark
4	William and Anna Davis House	William and Anna Davis House	May 10, 1984 (#84001633)	505 S. Denton St. 33°37′14″N 97°08′34″W	Gainesville	Recorded Texas Historic Landmark
5	Nelson Farmstead		April 4, 2007 (#07000270)	7729 FM 678; 33°37′53″N 97°00′49″W	Gainesville	Includes Recorded Texas Historic Landmark
6	Santa Fe Passenger Depot	Santa Fe Passenger Depot	October 6, 1983 (#83003757)	505 E. Broadway; 33°37′30″N 97°08′26″W	Gainesville	Recorded Texas Historic Landmark
7	St. Peter's Roman Catholic Church	St. Peter's Roman Catholic Church	May 25, 1979 (#79002927)	Ash St. 33°38′09″N 97°13′35″W	Lindsay	Recorded Texas Historic Landmark
8	Thomason-Scott House	Thomason-Scott House	September 30, 1980 (#80004086)	Just west of FM 51 on FM 922; 33°29′42″N 97°17′20″W	Era	Recorded Texas Historic Landmark

== See also ==
- National Register of Historic Places listings in Texas
- Recorded Texas Historic Landmarks in Cooke County
