= St. Peter's Roman Catholic Church (Lindsay, Texas) =

Historic church in Texas, United States

- U.S. National Register of Historic Places
- Recorded Texas Historic Landmark
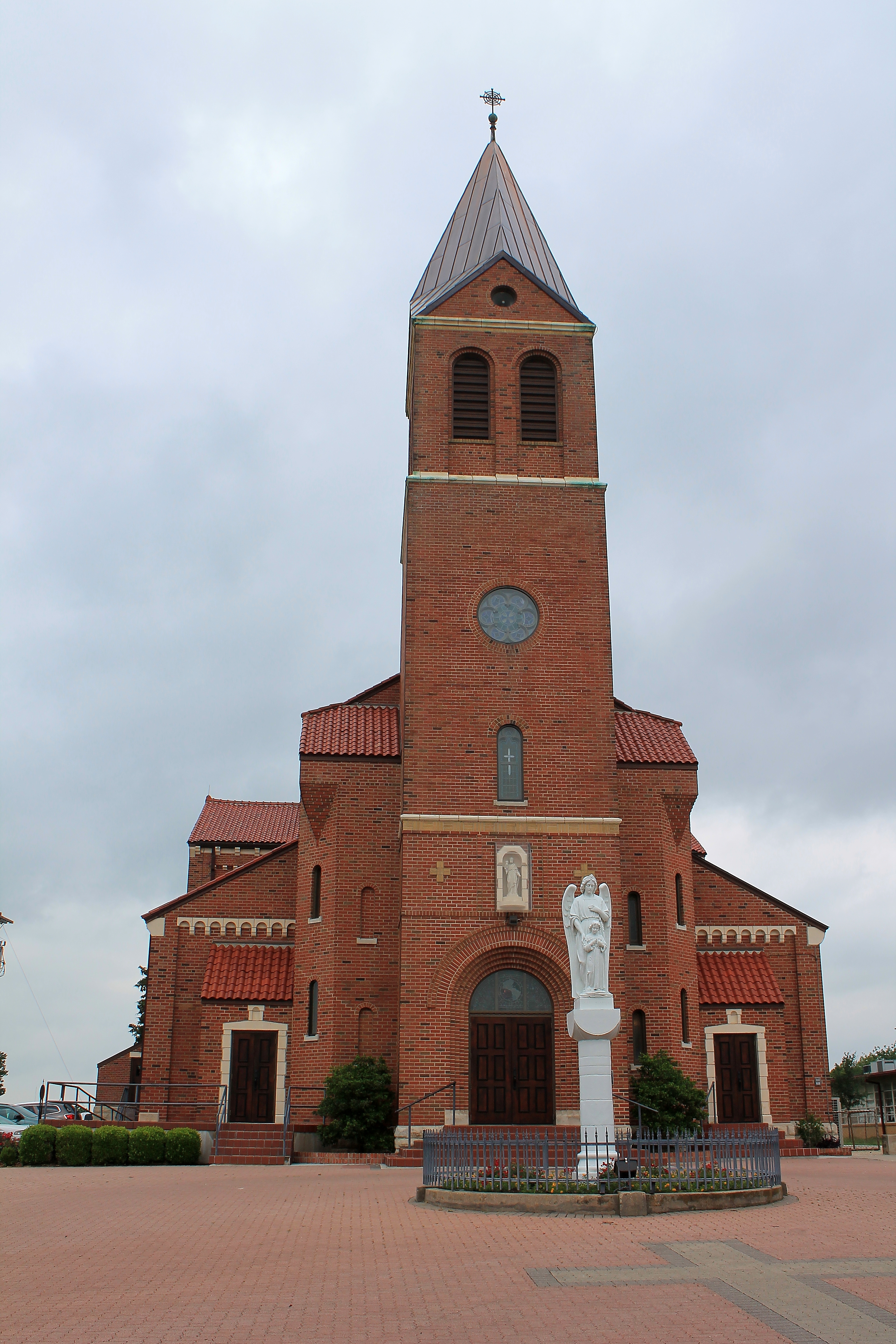
- St. Peter's Church in 2013

- Location within Texas Location within the United States
- Location: 424 Main Street, Lindsay, Texas
- Coordinates: 33°38′9″N 97°13′35″W
- Area: 7.5 acres (3.0 ha)
- Built: 1903
- Architect: Frank A. Ludewig
- Architectural style: Romanesque
- MPS: Churches with Decorative Interior Painting TR
- NRHP reference No.: 79002927
- RTHL No.: 5077

Significant dates
- Added to NRHP: May 25, 1979
- Designated RTHL: 1970

St. Peter's Roman Catholic Church is a historic church on Ash Street in Lindsay, Cooke County, Texas.

It was built in 1903 and added to the National Register in 1979.

At first appearance, you would think that this is a stone church, much like the German immigrants that founded Lindsay would have attended in their home country. On closer examination, it is carefully painted (and maintained) wood.

The church is part of the Roman Catholic Diocese of Fort Worth.

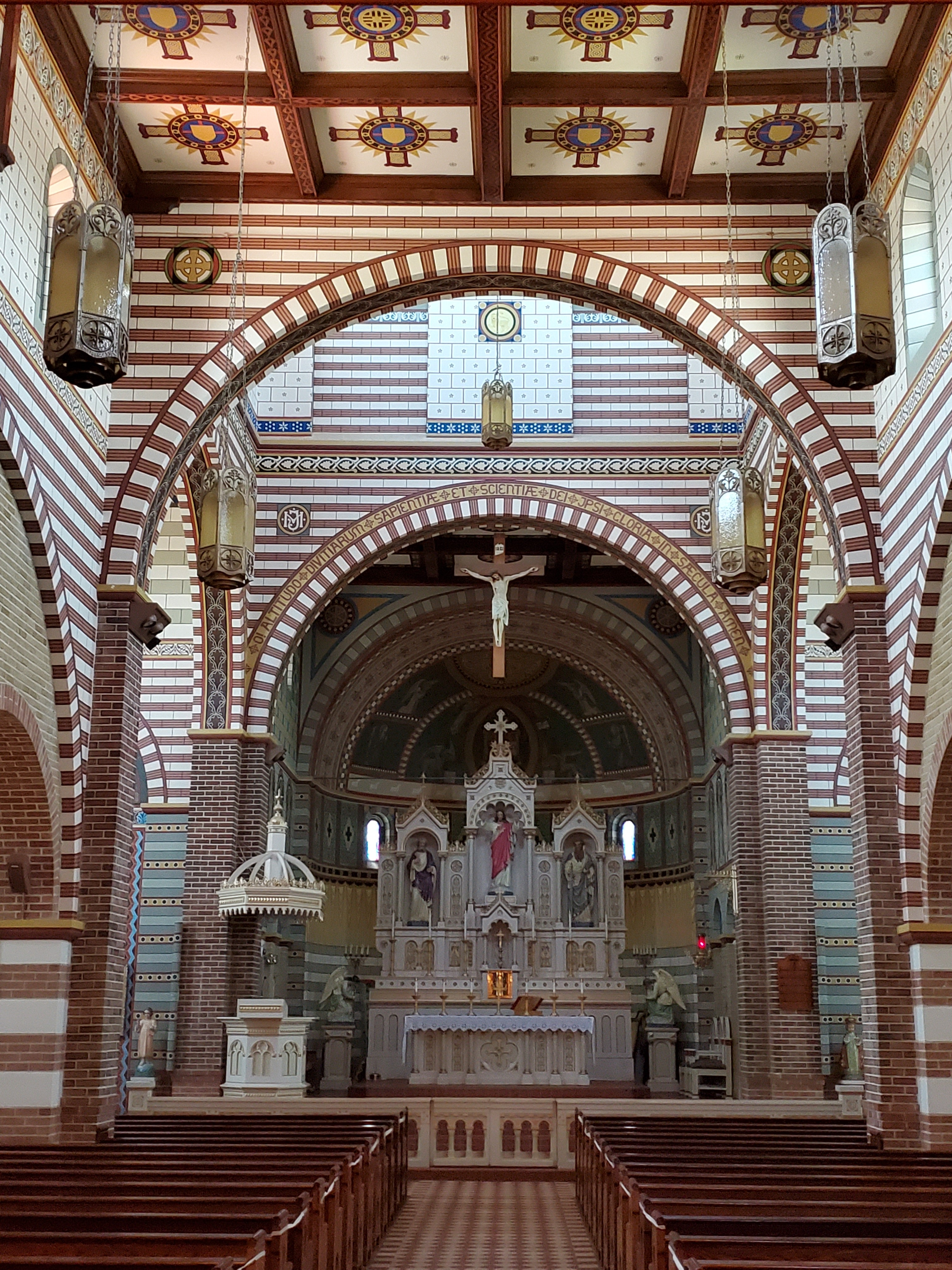
Interior of Saint Peter's Catholic Church

== See also ==
- National Register of Historic Places listings in Cooke County, Texas
- Recorded Texas Historic Landmarks in Cooke County
