= Steven Beseau =

American Catholic priest (born 1966)

The Reverend Monsignor Steven Beseau
- Rector and President, Pontifical College Josephinum
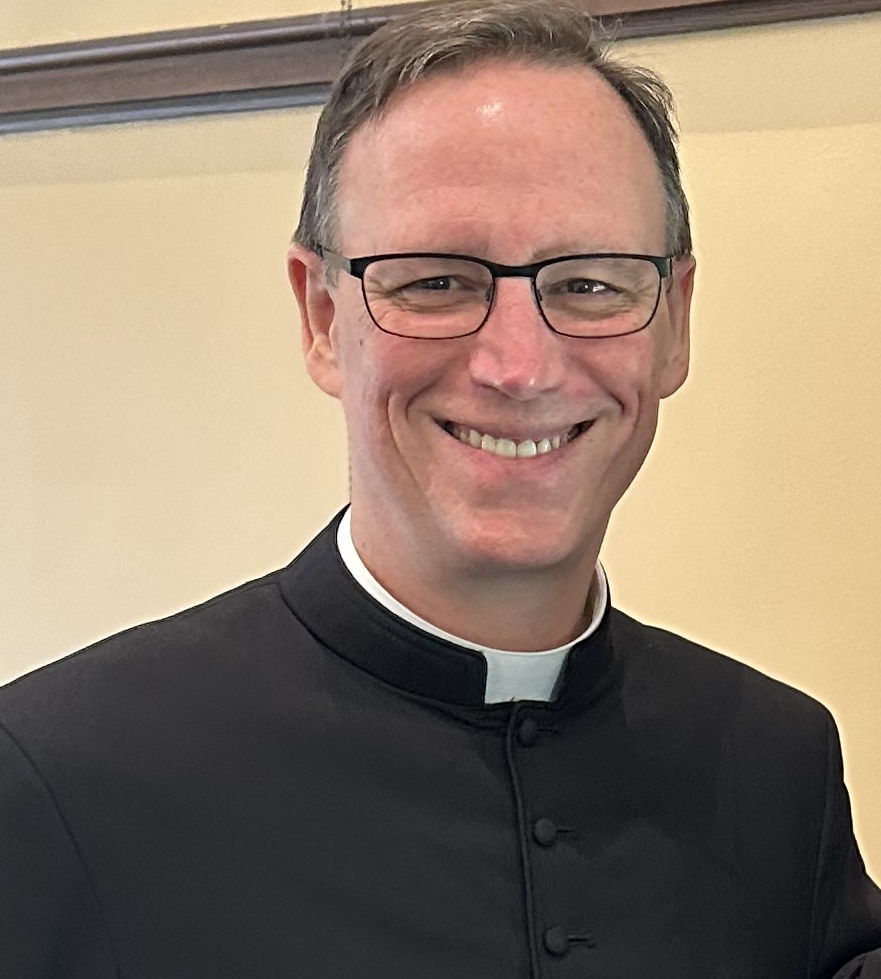
- Church: Catholic
- Archdiocese: Kansas City in Kansas
- Appointed: March 19, 2019
- Predecessor: Monsignor Christopher J. Schreck
- Other posts: Professor of Moral Theology, Athenaeum of Ohio; Chaplain and Campus Minister, University of Kansas

Orders
- Ordination: June 10, 1995 by James Patrick Keleher

Personal details
- Born: May 24, 1966 (age 60) Shawnee, Kansas, US
- Education: University of Kansas; Saint Mary of the Lake Seminary; Pontifical University of Saint Thomas Aquinas

Steven Beseau (born May 24, 1966) is an American Catholic prelate of the Archdiocese of Kansas City in Kansas who has served as rector and president of the Pontifical College Josephinum since 2019. In 2026 he was named a Chaplain of His Holiness with the title monsignor by Pope Leo XIV.

== Biography ==
=== Early life ===
Beseau was born in Shawnee, Kansas on May 24, 1966, to David and Mary Sue (née Sigourney) Beseau, being one of four children. He graduated from Aquinas High School in Shawnee, in 1984, and earned his bachelors degree in education from the University of Kansas and masters degree in divinity from the University of Saint Mary of the Lake before being ordained a priest for the Archdiocese of Kansas City in Kansas in June 1995 by Archbishop James Keleher. His first assignment was as associate pastor at St. Ann's in Prairie Village.

=== Priesthood ===
Following ordination, Beseau pursued his doctorate at the Pontifical University of Saint Thomas Aquinas in Rome, in 2010 defending a dissertation entitled "Magnanimity as an Interpretive Key for Moral Catechesis of Young Adults", having begun it five years earlier in 2005. He also served as a campus minister and chaplain at the University of Kansas.

In 2016, he was appointed an assistant professor of moral theology at the Athenaeum of Ohio before being appointed the seventeenth rector and president of the Pontifical College Josephinum in March 2019. In 2023, Lazzaro You Heung-sik appointed Beseau to a further three years as rector-president.

In recognition of "long and dedicated service to the Church", Beseau was named a Chaplain of His Holiness with the title monsignor in April 2026.
