= Leonard J. Fick =

American Roman Catholic priest (1915–1990)

- Born: September 6, 1915; Rich Fountain, Missouri, United States
- Died: June 4, 1990 (aged 74); Worthington, Ohio, United States

Education
- Education: Saint Louis University; University of California, Berkeley

Philosophical work
- Institutions: Pontifical College Josephinum; Ohio Dominican University
- Main interests: Theology, Education, journalism, ethics

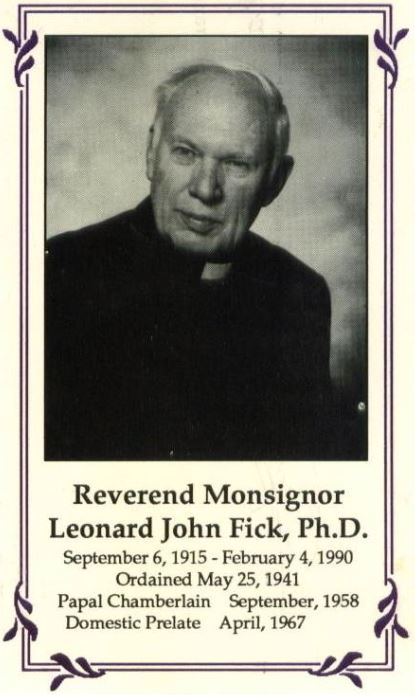
Commemorative Holy Card

Leonard J. Fick (September 6, 1915 – February 4, 1990) was an American Roman Catholic priest and college administrator in Ohio whose educational career spanned over fifty years. Fick devoted more than sixty years to the Pontifical College Josephinum.

== Childhood ==
Leonard John Fick was born in Rich Fountain, Missouri, on September 6, 1915. He was the oldest of the four sons of Herman and Mary Klebba Fick. His family were German-speaking Catholics. He graduated from Sacred Heart Elementary School in 1928.

== Seminary education ==
Beginning his high school studies in the fall of 1929, Fick attended the Pontifical College Josephinum to begin his high school seminary studies.

== Academic career ==
When he was ordained a Roman Catholic priest in 1941, the young priest was requested to stay on and join the teaching faculty at the Josephinum. So as a student, teacher and administrator, Fick would be associated with the Josephinum for more than 61 years. After graduating from the Seminary College, Fick went on to study English literature at Saint Louis University, the University of California, Berkeley and the Ohio State University, where he completed his doctoral studies in 1951.

In 1958 Fick was appointed to the first level of Monsignorate by Rome. He would be appointed to the second level in 1967. For twenty-one years, 1948–1969, Monsignor Fick also taught English at the College of St. Mary of the Springs, (now Ohio Dominican University). A Monsignor Fick literary committee still meets at Ohio Dominican in his honor.

He was also a moderator of several literary clubs formed by graduates. He addressed the seminary section at meetings of the National Catholic Education Association and helped other seminaries as a member of various teams that were sent to inspect the status of vocational education by the US Bishops' Committee on Priestly Formation.

Fick was named chairman of the English Department of the College in 1952. In 1958 he was named academic dean. He served as Vice Rector of the combined schools of the Josephinum Campus from 1969 until 1989.

== Accreditation efforts for the Josephinum schools ==
At the Josephinum Schools, Fick could see that the institution's future was tied to its stature academically both within Catholic as well as public educational accreditation institutions. To that end, Fick undertook a long-term effort at attaining accreditation. As a direct result of his work, the Josephinum College was granted candidacy in 1972 in the North Central Association and full accreditation in 1976. This process took sixteen years of sustained and detailed effort including five self-studies and mountains of paperwork. When full accreditation was awarded it also included the Graduate School of Theology.

== Author and writer ==
Fick authored numerous papers, articles and several books. In 1947 Fick edited the school publication formerly named The Josephinum Weekly, that had been in print since 1916, and renamed it The Josephinum Review. Fick was editor of this magazine for twenty years and authored the editorial column on the front page as well. Fick wrote The Light Beyond: A Study of Hawthorne's Theology, ISBN 0-88305-207-5, a book originally published in 1955 by The Newman Press and reprinted in 1975 by Norwood Editions. He also authored a book on the German stigmatic, Therese Neumann, What about Therese Neumann: A concise background for and analysis of the critical reception accorded Hilda C. Graef's the case of Therese Neumann, The Newman Press, 1951 ASIN, B0007H5KMO In November 1988, Fick authored the definitive history of the Pontifical College Josephinum, The Jessing Legacy, 1888–1988: A Centennial History of the Pontifical College Josephinum. ISBN 978-0-317-92311-7 through the Kairos Press.

== Death in 1990 ==
Fick died from complications of heart disease in 1990. He was buried in the Josephinum Cemetery, on the grounds of the institution after a memorial service attended by over five hundred people including several bishops and over eighty priests.

== Legacy ==
Ohio Dominican University (ODU), where he taught for over twenty years, continues to sponsor the Ohio Dominican Literary Committee that Fick started and hosts Ohio Dominican Literary events featuring guest speakers. ODU also started the Monsignor Leonard Fick Scholarship Fund in his honor for ODU students majoring in English. The school holds an annual Monsignor Leonard Fick Literary Brunch, which honors the late Ohio Dominican faculty member and raises funds for Literary events.

At his beloved Josephinum, prior to his death and in recognition of his notable service to the Josephinum, the auditorium in the College's 1958 recreation building was named in his honor. He received an honorary degree from ODU in 1986.

== See also ==
- Joseph Jessing
