= Pontifical College Josephinum =

Private university in Columbus, Ohio, US

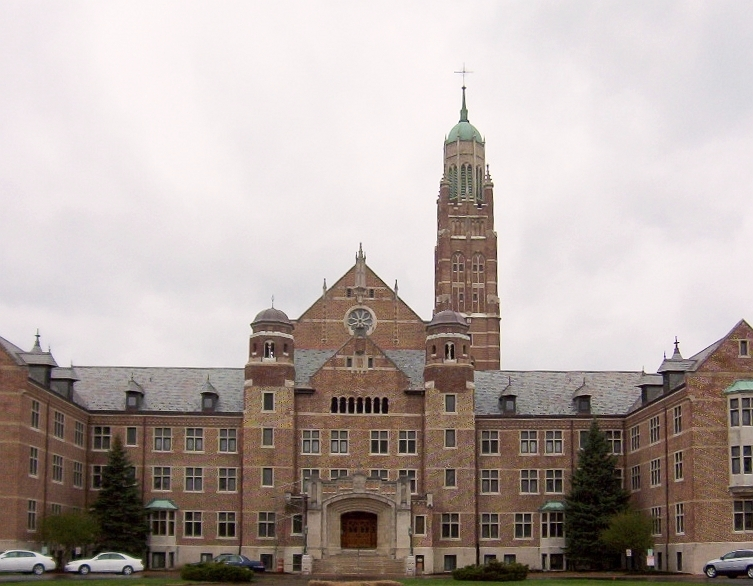
- Motto: Si Deus pro nobis, quis contra nos
- Motto in English: If God is for us, who can be against us? (Romans 8:31)
- Type: Seminary, private university, and Pontifical College
- Established: 1888
- Parent institution: Dicastery for the Clergy; Congregation for Catholic Education
- Accreditation: ATS, HLC
- Religious affiliation: Roman Catholic
- Chancellor: Gabriele Giordano Caccia, Apostolic Nuncio to the United States (ex officio)
- Vice-Chancellor: Earl K. Fernandes, Bishop of Columbus (ex officio)
- Rector: Steven Beseau
- Faculty: 38
- Students: 81
- Location: Columbus, Ohio, United States; 40°07′12″N 83°01′07″W
- Campus: Suburban, 100 acres (0.4 km^{2})
- Website: www.pcj.edu

The Pontifical College Josephinum is a Roman Catholic seminary and private university in Columbus, Ohio, United States. It was founded by Joseph Jessing in 1888 to prepare seminarians for the many German-speaking communities in the United States at that time. The college was granted the status of a Pontifical College in 1892 by Pope Leo XIII, making it the only pontifical seminary in North America. The institution is accredited by the Higher Learning Commission (HLC) and Association of Theological Schools in the United States and Canada (ATS).

== History ==
=== Background and foundation ===
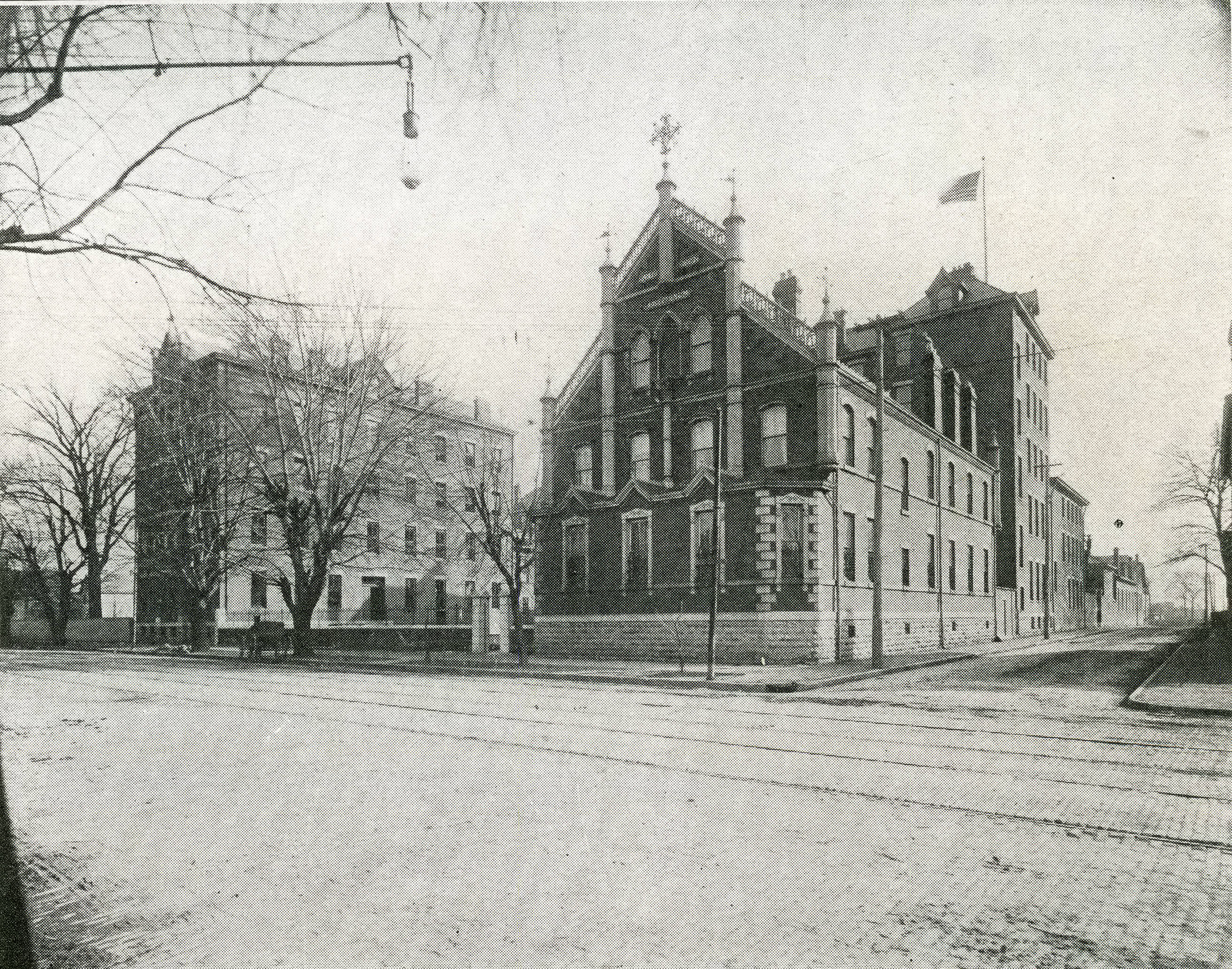
Columbus location of the college

Joseph Jessing emigrated from Germany to the United States in 1867, was ordained to the priesthood in 1870, and assigned to Sacred Heart Church in Pomeroy. Within his first year at Sacred Heart, the parish purchased a house next door to serve as an orphanage for twelve local boys, supported in part by a German-language newspaper that Jessing wrote. The newspaper and orphanage, known as the St. Joseph Orphan Asylum, grew so rapidly that five years later, in 1876, Jessing moved both the orphanage and the printing operations of the Waisenfreund to Columbus for greater railroad access. The facility, located at the intersection of Main and Seventeenth Streets in Columbus gave both a Catholic education and training in the trades to the young men in its care.

In October 1888, prompted both by the desire of some of the orphan boys to study for the priesthood and the need for German-speaking priests, Jessing founded the Collegium Josephinum. Its first class of 23 men began formation at the Columbus site.

As those first students progressed through the seminary program, the institution initially provided six years of primary education ("minor seminary," four years of high school and two years of college/pre-theology) and six years of secondary seminary education ("major seminary," another two years of college/pre-theology and four years of theology/seminary). Jessing lived to see the first six seminarians ordained to the priesthood in June 1899 but he died less than six months later.

=== Pontifical status ===
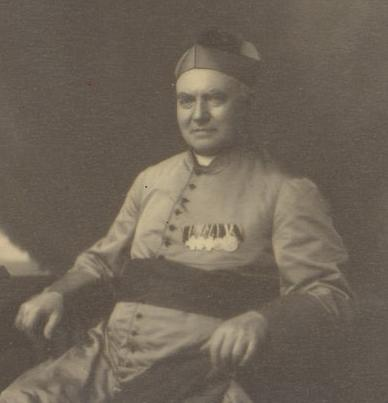
Joseph Jessing, seen here in 1896 wearing decorations from his years in the Prussian Army, founded the Josephinum in 1888.

Pope Leo XIII granted pontifical status to the Josephinum with this hand-written, Latin letter in 1892.

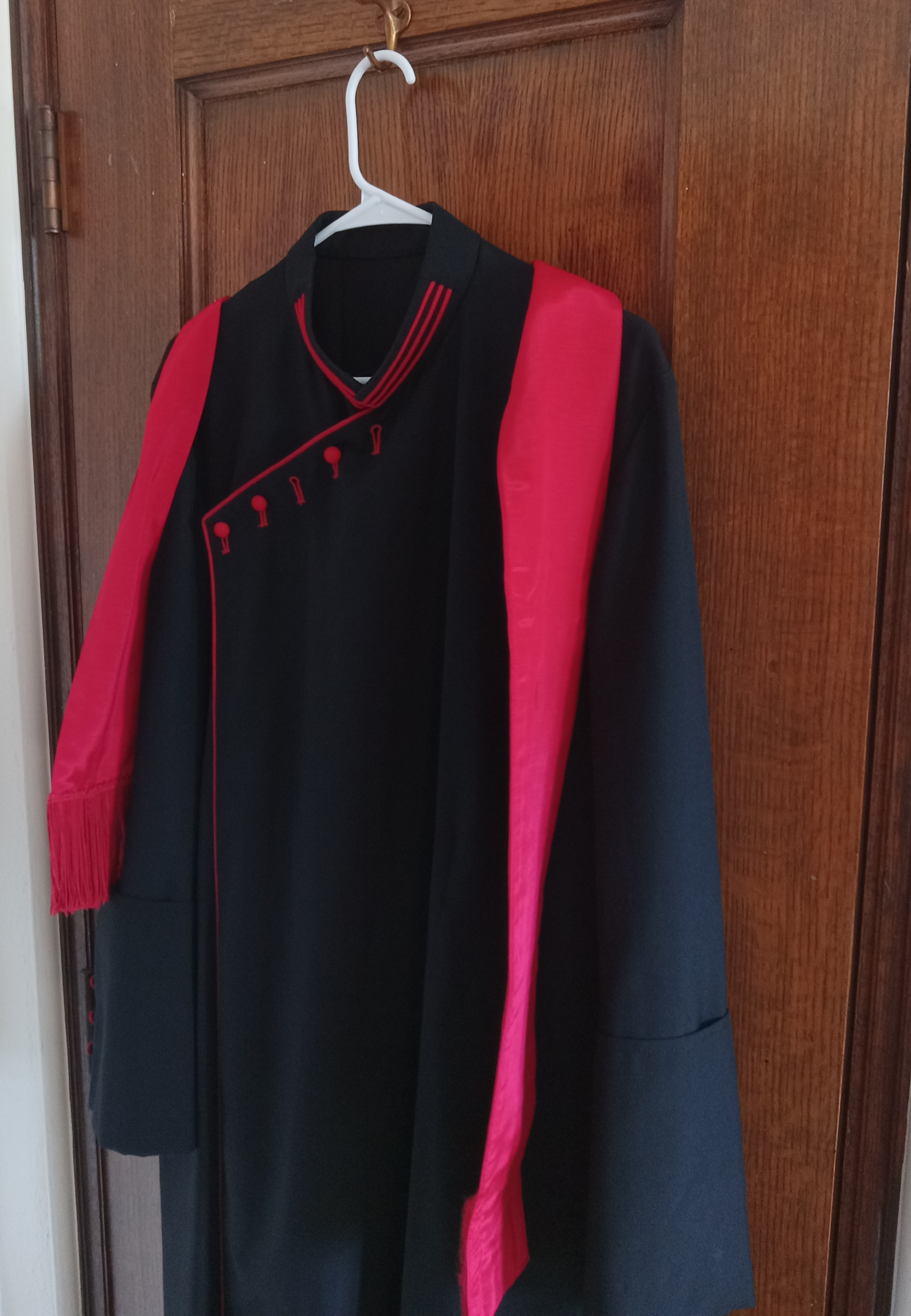
Pontifical cassock of the Josephinum, identical to the house cassock of the Collegio Urbano because both were established under Propaganda Fide.

To make sure that the fledgling institution would continue after his death, Jessing asked that it be placed under the protection of the Holy See. Pope Leo XIII granted the request in 1892, thus making the new institution, now called the Pontifical College Josephinum, the only pontifical seminary outside of Italy. Like the much older Collegio Urbano, the Pontifical Collegium Josephinum was initially connected to Rome by the Congregation for the Propaganda of the Faith, as is evidenced in it charter from Leo XIII below. From the granting of pontifical status to the present, the institution has been under the direction of the Dicastery for Catholic Education, with the Apostolic Nuncio to the United States as its chancellor. The college is governed by a board of trustees.

=== Relocation to present campus ===
In 1931, the Josephinum moved to its present location just north of Worthington, Ohio and eleven miles (18 km) north of downtown Columbus on a landmark 100-acre (0.40 km^{2}) campus. The current size of the campus is slightly less than 97.5 acres (395,000 m^{2}) with another approximately 12-acre (49,000 m^{2}) parcel close by. The new complex was designed by architect Frank A. Ludewig and cost $1.5 million to construct.

The academic structure of the seminary changed over time during the 1940s and 1950s from the "six-six" format to four years of high school, four years of college, and four years of theology/seminary. Reflecting the German origins of its founder and its service to the German-speaking community, the seminary high school and college held almost all classes in German until more non-German speaking students entered. The first official college commencement occurred in June 1953; the college and recreation buildings were dedicated in 1958. The high school closed in 1967 due to a decline in the number of applicants.

For the first few decades of its existence, the seminary focused its work on educating priests to work with the large population of German immigrants in the United States. The Josephinum was incorporated in Ohio in 1894; its constitution was approved by Pope Pius XI in 1938 and was most recently revised and approved by the Congregation for Catholic Education in 1996.

=== Modernization and increasing international focus ===
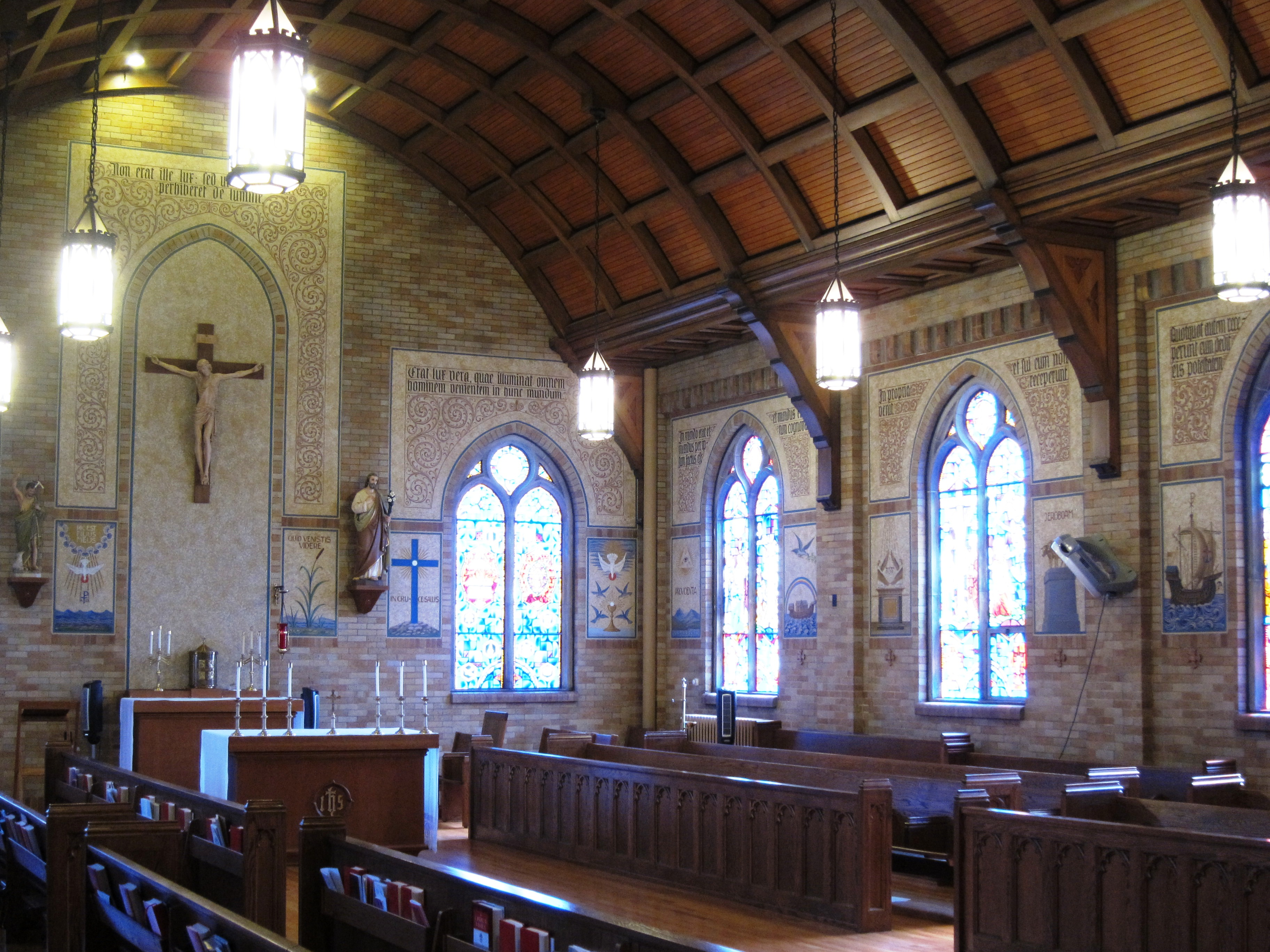
The Josephinum's Saint Joseph oratory

In the years after World War I, the focus of the seminary shifted away from its original mission of meeting the spiritual needs of German-speaking Catholics to a wider mission of preparing priests for dioceses throughout the United States that lacked their own seminary. With the advent of the Second Vatican Council in 1962, the Church took on a more outward-looking and evangelical orientation. It was only natural that seminaries like the Josephinum also become increasingly involved in outreach and ministry work in their local communities. Though the German language has left the halls of the Josephinum -save the library's collection- the missionary focus of the college remains a continuity from its gift of pontifical right under the missionary congregation Propaganda Fide.

Rev. Steven P. Beseau assumed leadership of the Pontifical College Josephinum on October 1, 2019. Josephinum alumni serve the Church in 48 states and 22 foreign countries. The Josephinum continues to prepare priests for U.S. dioceses that do not have their own seminaries, missionary areas of the United States, including regions of the U.S. with growing Hispanic communities and finally, dioceses around the world in need of help with the education of their seminarians.

== List of Rectors ==
- Joseph Jessing (1888–1899)
- John J. Soentgerath (1900–1919)
- Joseph Och (1919–1932)
- Henry J. Grimmelsman (1932–1944)
- Adrian F. Brandehoff (1945–1952)
- Paul A. Gieringer (1952–1962)
- Ralph A. Thompson (1962–1967)
- Thomas P. Campbell (1967–1974)
- Frank A. Mouch (1974–1984)
- Dennis F. Sheehan (1986–1989)
- Blase J. Cupich (1989–1996)
- Thomas J. Olmsted (1997–1999)
- Earl A. Boyea (2000–2002)
- Paul J. Langsfeld (2003–2009)
- James A. Wehner (2009–2012)
- Christopher J. Schreck (2012–2019)
- Steven P. Beseau (2019–present)

== Accreditation and certification ==
Led by a decades long effort by its most significant graduate and 20th century leader, Leonard J. Fick, the Josephinum was accredited by the Higher Learning Commission (HLC), then an affiliate of the North Central Association of Colleges and Secondary Schools, in 1976. The Josephinum has been accredited by the Association of Theological Schools in the United States and Canada (ATS) since 1970. The seminary also holds a Certificate of Authorization from the Ohio Board of Regents.

In March 2022, the ATS issued a warning to the institution, as did the HLC in June of the same year. Issues included problems in strategic planning, internal leadership structures, and declining enrollment in the college. In light of the warnings, the Josephinum addressed the problems and revised its formation program to better meet the requirements of both institutions. As such, the warnings from the HLC were lifted in 2024, though monitoring reports will be carried out to ensure the program stays up to code. The ATS has further re-labeled the Josephinum as "accredited in good standing".

== See also ==
- Statue of Christopher Columbus, originally commissioned for the school
