= Kruisstraat railway station =

Railway station in 's-Hertogenbosch, the Netherlands

Coordinates: 51°43′24.48″N 5°23′50.66″E

Kruisstraat railway station was a railway station on the railway track Tilburg - Nijmegen. It was located near the village Kruisstraat ('s-Hertogenbosch) between Sprokkelbosch and Nuland. The railway station was opened in 1881 but was closed in 1938. The station has never been reopened.
