= Sprokkelbosch =

Former hamlet near Rosmalen, Netherlands

Coordinates: 51°43′N 5°23′E

Sprokkelbosch is a former hamlet near Rosmalen, Netherlands. Sprokkelbosch was south of the Tilburg - Nijmegen railway and had its own railway station; its name was also Sprokkelbosch.

The road which led to Sprokkelbosch is now a cycling road in the urb Sparrenburg.
