= Joseph Jessing =

Msgr. Joseph Jessing was the founder of the first Pontifical college in North America, the Josephinum near Columbus, Ohio

John Joseph Jessing (November 17, 1836 – November 2, 1899) a German-American immigrant, who became a Catholic priest in the United States, and was a pioneer in Catholic orphanage work and Catholic education. He was also the founder of the Pontifical College Josephinum in Columbus, Ohio, in 1888.

== Birth and childhood ==
In the early 19th century, a young German named John William Jessing married Anna Maria Schlusemann of Stadtlohn near the Dutch boundary. Anna was John's second wife. She was the daughter of Engelbert Schlusemann, a shoemaker, the trade in which her husband also was engaged. Three children were born of this union, including John Joseph, born on November 17, 1836 at No. 4 Kleiboltengasse in Münster in Prussia. A daughter, Wilhelmina Frances lived (December 31, 1839 - September 4, 1940) and a posthumous son, Bernard Anthony William lived (August 12, 1841 - May 1869). In 1840, Joseph's father, John William, died leaving a very young family.

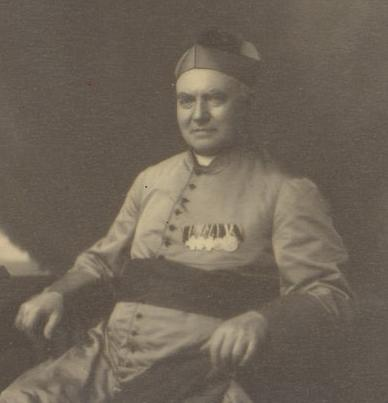
Msgr. Jessing in 1896, wearing military decorations earned during his service in the Prussian Army

== Early years and Prussian military service ==
As a boy, Jessing worked in a print shop to provide for his mother and two siblings as his father had died when Jessing was only four years old. The young boy devoted what little spare time he had to reading and study. When he grew to manhood, Jessing did what many young boys did when he enlisted in the Prussian army, an organization known for its severe training regimen and discipline.

In the army, Jessing rose to the rank of quartermaster sergeant, who proved himself a successful fighter as well as logistician. He was decorated by King William I of Prussia for bravery at the Battle of Dybbøl, earning many decorations and medals for his service in the Seventh Westphalian Artillery during both the First and the Second wars with Denmark over the Schleswig-Holstein Question. Despite all these military achievements, Joseph's dream of ordination remained his true ambition.

In 1867, Jessing left his home in Münster, Westphalia, to pursue his lifelong vocation of the Roman Catholic priesthood.

== Immigration and ordination ==
In 1867, young Joseph emigrated to the United States and began his studies at Mount Saint Mary's Seminary of the West in Cincinnati, Ohio, in 1868, to serve in the newly founded Diocese of Columbus. He was ordained a priest by its first bishop, the Right Reverend Sylvester Rosecrans, at St. Patrick Pro-Cathedral in Columbus on July 16, 1870, and was assigned to Sacred Heart Church in Pomeroy, Ohio.

Father Jessing's letter in 1877 requesting the relocation of his orphanage and orphan industries to Columbus, Ohio

== Newspaper and orphanage ==
Soon after arriving at Sacred Heart, Jessing became deeply concerned about the orphan boys in his parish. With the assistance of the Poor Brothers of Saint Francis, he provided these needy children with shelter, food, and schooling. This work led to his establishing the Saint Joseph Orphan Asylum. The orphanage was funded primarily through Jessing's German-language newspaper, The Ohio (later called Ohio Waisenfreund, meaning "Ohio Orphan's Friend"), with Jessing as chief writer and publisher. Jessing used the proceeds from the small newspaper to fund his work with the orphans so that it would be self-sustaining. Ohio Waisenfreund became one of the leading German language Catholic newspapers.

In 1877, Father Jessing wrote a letter to Bishop Rosecrans asking permission to bring his newspaper and the orphan's asylum to a larger city. In that letter, he explained that he needed to be closer to the railroad in order to distribute his paper. Since he wanted the work to be self-sustaining, he also discussed an industrial school that he wanted to start in connection with the orphan's asylum where boys could learn a trade to support themselves as adults.

Rosecrans approved Jessing's plan, and the newspaper and orphan's asylum were moved to Columbus later that year and was closer to the railroad. Besides the industrial school, Father Jessing started various trade opportunities for the orphans including the Josephinum Church Furniture Company where the boys could be taught a trade.

== Collegium Josephinum seminary ==
When four older boys expressed a desire to study for the priesthood, Jessing advertised in his paper that he would sponsor two boys who wished to become priests but who lacked the financial means to do so. Of the forty applicants, Jessing accepted twenty-three and the first academic classes began on September 1, 1888. In memory of the original St. Joseph's Orphanage, this seminary was called, in Latin, the Collegium Josephinum or Josephinum College. The college's name was eventually changed to its modern name, the Pontifical College Josephinum. As those first students progressed through the seminary program, the institution initially provided six years of primary education ("minor seminary," four years of high school and two years of college) and six years of secondary seminary education ("major seminary," another two years of college/pre-theology and four years of theology/ seminary).

Letter, in Latin, from the Vatican granting Pontifical status to the Josephinum in 1892

To ensure that the Josephinum would continue after his death, Jessing asked that the fledgling institution be placed under the protection of the Holy See. Pope Leo XIII granted the request in 1892, thus making the Josephinum the first Pontifical University outside of Italy. From that time to the present, the institution has been under the direction of the Congregation for Seminaries, with the Apostolic Nuncio to the United States as its Chancellor. The Josephinum was incorporated under the laws of the State of Ohio in 1894. The seminary is financially independent from both the Holy See and the Diocese of Columbus.

In June 1896, Pope Leo named Jessing to the title of Domestic Prelate to honor him for his years of service to the Church and the community. Due to this, he was now referred to as Monsignor Jessing.

The first six seminarians to graduate the program were ordained to the priesthood in June 1899. Monsignor Jessing was able to witness this before his death a few months later, on November 2 of that year.

== Death ==
Joseph Jessing died in Columbus, Ohio on November 2, 1899. In 1968 the graduates of the seminary erected a plaque in his home city of Münster to honor Jessing. The Conference Center at the Pontifical College Josephinum is named after Monsignor Jessing.

== See also ==
- Pontifical College Josephinum
- Leonard J. Fick
