= Sprokkelbosch railway station =

Railway station in 's-Hertogenbosch, the Netherlands

Coordinates: 51°43′9.93″N 5°23′4.22″E

Sprokkelbosch railway station was a railway station on the railway track Tilburg - Nijmegen. It was located near the hamlet of Sprokkelbosch between Rosmalen and Kruisstraat. The railway station was opened in 1881 and closed in 1938.
