= Petrus van der Does de Willebois =

Dutch politician

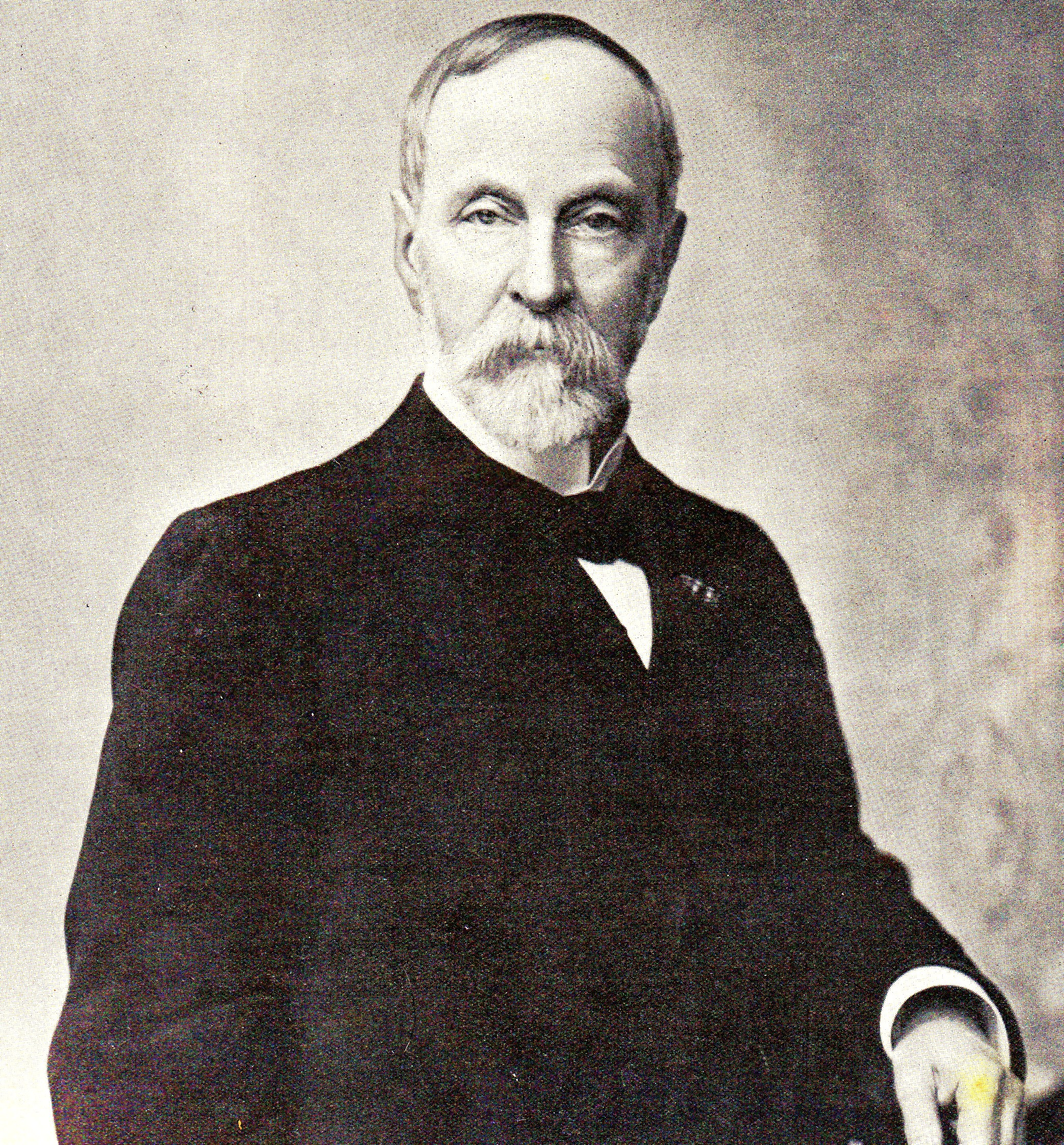
Willebois

Willebois (9 January 1843 – 11 May 1937) was a Dutch jonkheer and politician affiliated with the General League of Roman Catholic Caucuses. He was mayor of 's-Hertogenbosch and member of the Senate.

== Career ==
Van der Does became a member of the States of North Brabant in 1868 and succeeded his father as director of the Maatschappij van Brandverzekering voor het Koninklijk der Nederlanden ("Company of fire-ensurances for the Kingdom of the Netherlands"). From 1870 until 1885 he was a member of the Gedeputeerde staten and from 26 March 1884 until 1 July 1917 he was mayor of 's-Hertogenbosch. In 1898 he was also elected a member of the Senate.

== Decorations and commissions ==
Van der Does was a knight in the Order of the Netherlands Lion, commander in the Order of Orange-Nassau and commander in the Order of St. Gregory the Great. He was captain of the schutterij of 's-Hertogenbosch, member of the college of regents of Almshouses and general poor, vice-chairman of the schoolcommission, chairman of the ridderschap (gathering of nobles), member of the mainboard of the Sint Radboud Stichting (current Stichting Thomas More) and chairman of the Royal school of useful and imaging arts.
