= Kruisstraat, 's-Hertogenbosch =

Coordinates: 51°43′54″N 5°23′40″E

Kruisstraat
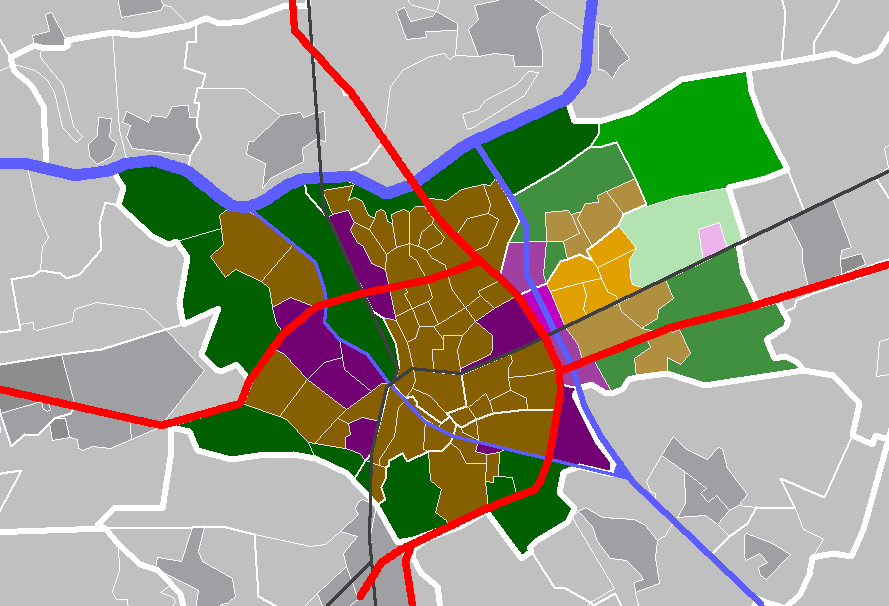
- Country: Netherlands
- Province: North Brabant
- Municipality: 's-Hertogenbosch

Area
  - Total: 3.55 km^{2} (1.37 sq mi)

Population
  - Total: 560

Kruisstraat (Dutch pronunciation: [ˈkrœystraːt]) is a small Dutch settlement. It is located east of Rosmalen, in the municipality of 's-Hertogenbosch, and the province of North Brabant.
