= Saint Lambertchurch (Rosmalen) =

Church in Rosmalen, Netherlands

Coordinates: 51.719°N 5.363°E

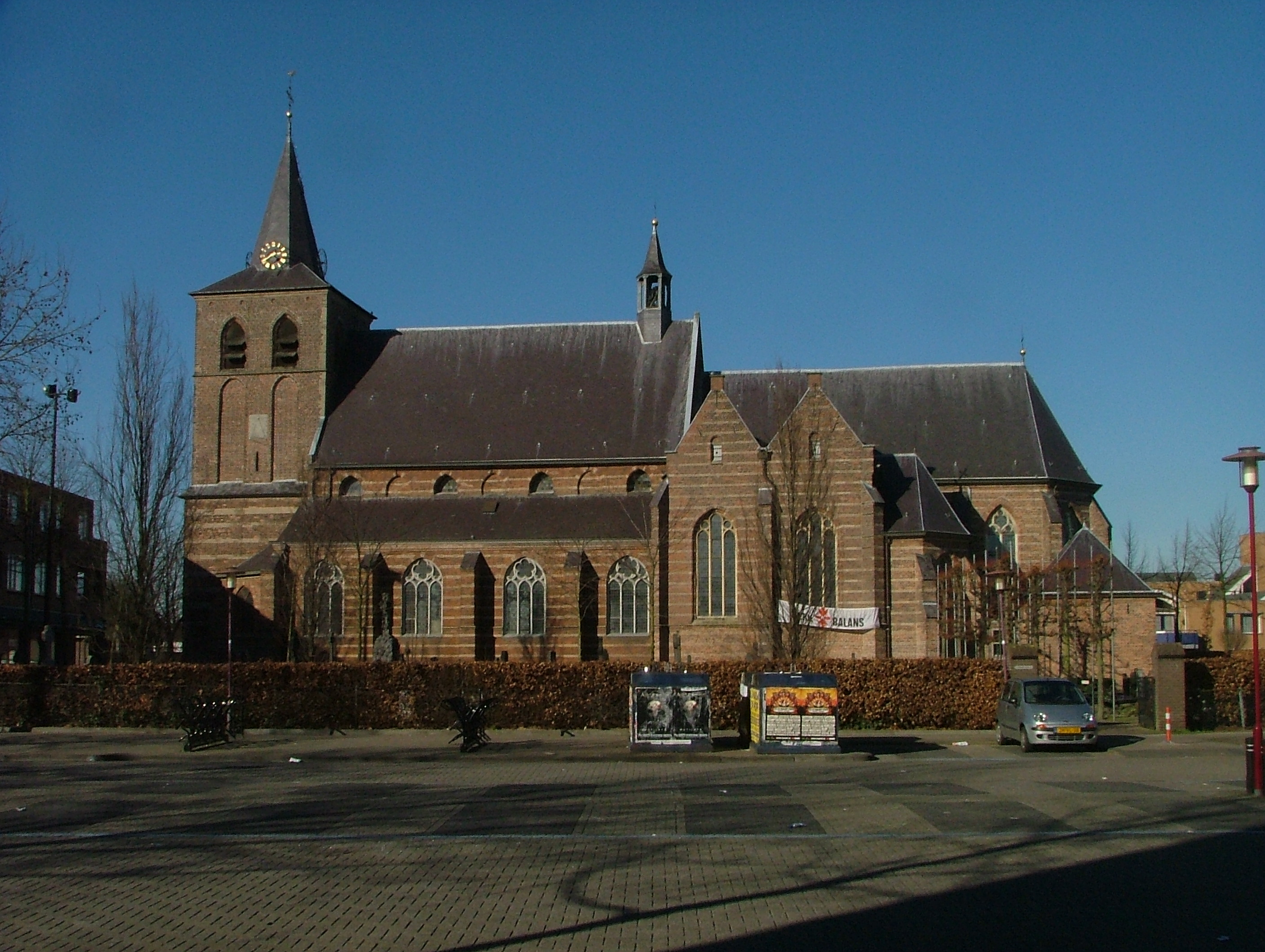
Saint Lambertchurch in Rosmalen.

The Saint Lambertchurch (Dutch: Sint-Lambertuskerk) is a Catholic church in Rosmalen, North Brabant, Netherlands. The name of the church refers to Lambert of Maastricht, the Seventh-Century Bishop of Maastricht.

In the Twelfth Century there was a church in Rosmalen, which was made of wood. In 1300 the church was made of Tuff, a stone which was used very commonly in the period.

The tower of the church was given its current form in 1430. The nave of the church was rebuilt in 1550.

After the Siege of 's-Hertogenbosch in 1629, the church was used by Protestants; the church was also used as a prison and a town hall. The church was restored to Roman Catholic service in 1823. In 1911 the choir was replaced and a second transept added to a design by Frank A. Ludewig from Nijmegen.
