= Rosmalen =

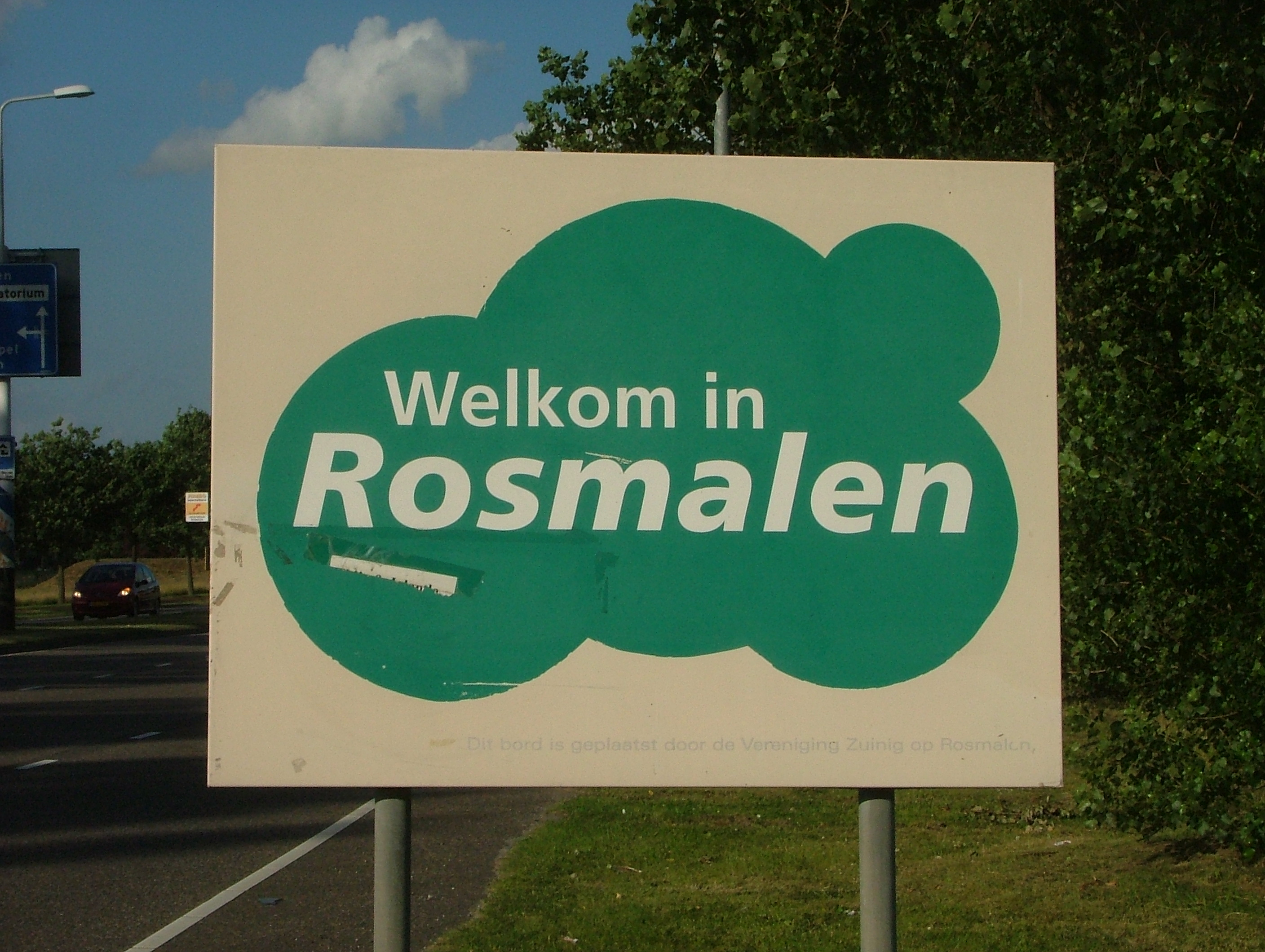

- Flag Coat of arms

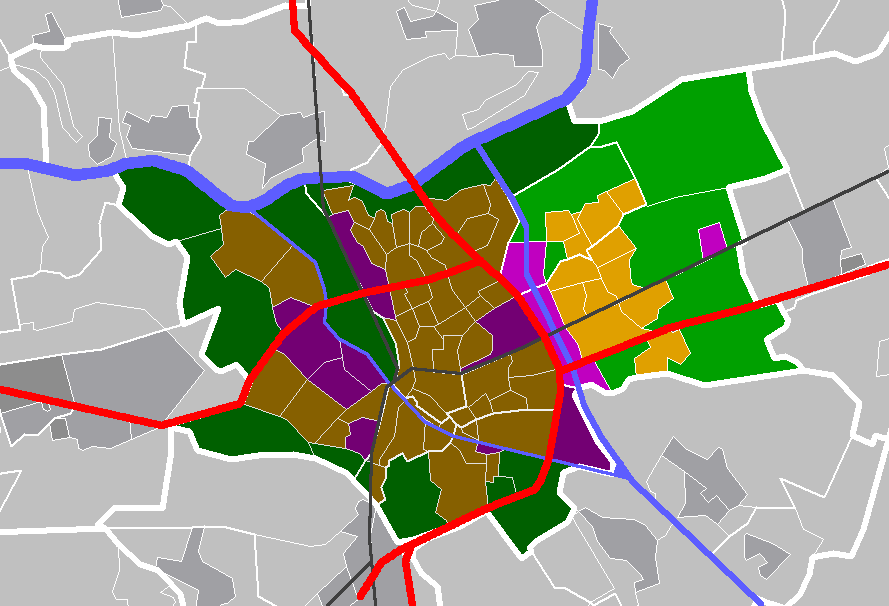
- Coordinates: 51°43′9″N 5°22′2″E
- Country: Netherlands
- Province: North Brabant
- Municipality: 's-Hertogenbosch

Area
  - Land: 30.89 km^{2} (11.93 sq mi)
  - Water: 0.36 km^{2} (0.14 sq mi)

Population (1 January 2008)
  - Total: 31,219
  - Density: 1,011/km^{2} (2,618/sq mi)
- Postal code: 5240-5249
- Major roads: A2, A59, N606, N625 spoorlijn 's-Hertogenbosch - Nijmegen

Rosmalen (Dutch pronunciation: [ˈrɔsmaːlə(n)]) is a town in the province of North Brabant, in the south of the Netherlands. The town is located 6 kilometers east of the city of 's-Hertogenbosch (Den Bosch) and has been part of that municipality since 1996. Its population is around 37,240 on 1 January 2021. In 2005 the town began construction of a new neighbourhood, De Groote Wielen (named after the large kolks in the area created by flood water), to include 5,000 homes and other buildings.

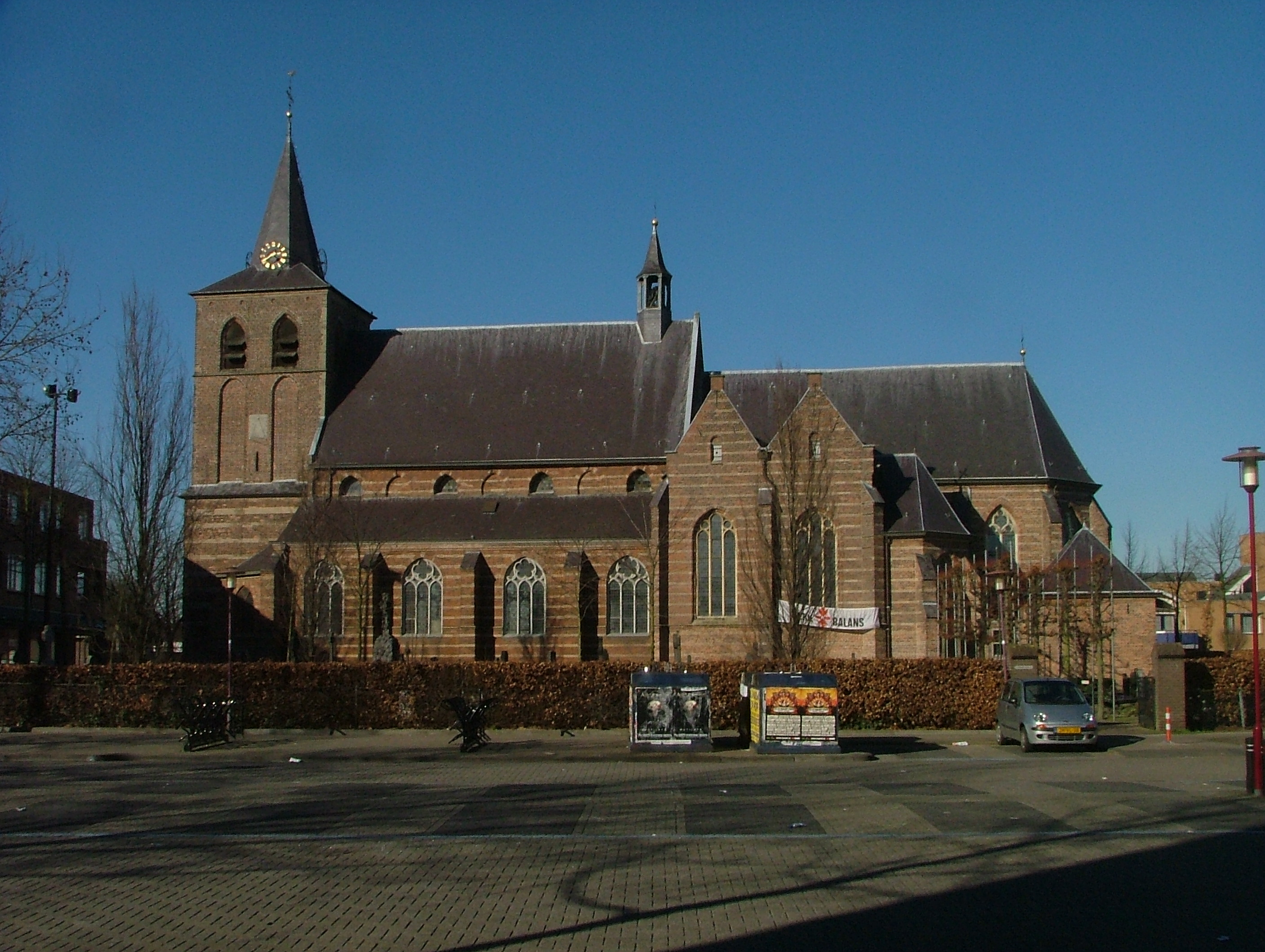
Saint Lambertchurch in Rosmalen.

Rosmalen is home to the football club OJC Rosmalen. Players from OJC have played for professional football clubs, including FC Den Bosch, RKC Waalwijk, and Willem II. Rosmalen is also home to the basketball club The Black Eagles, which is the second-largest in the Netherlands. Players from the club include Kees Akerboom, Jr., Thijs Vermeulen, Robin Goossens, and Rob van Mil.

Rosmalen is the location of the Autotron, formerly a car museum/attraction park and now a convention center. The park hosts an annual international tennis tournament in the summer, the Rosmalen Grass Court Championships. The park is located about 7 km east of 's-Hertogenbosch and can be reached via the A59.

== See also ==
- Eikenburg
- Markt, Rosmalen
- Rosmalen Noord
