= Lindsay, Cooke County, Texas =

- City
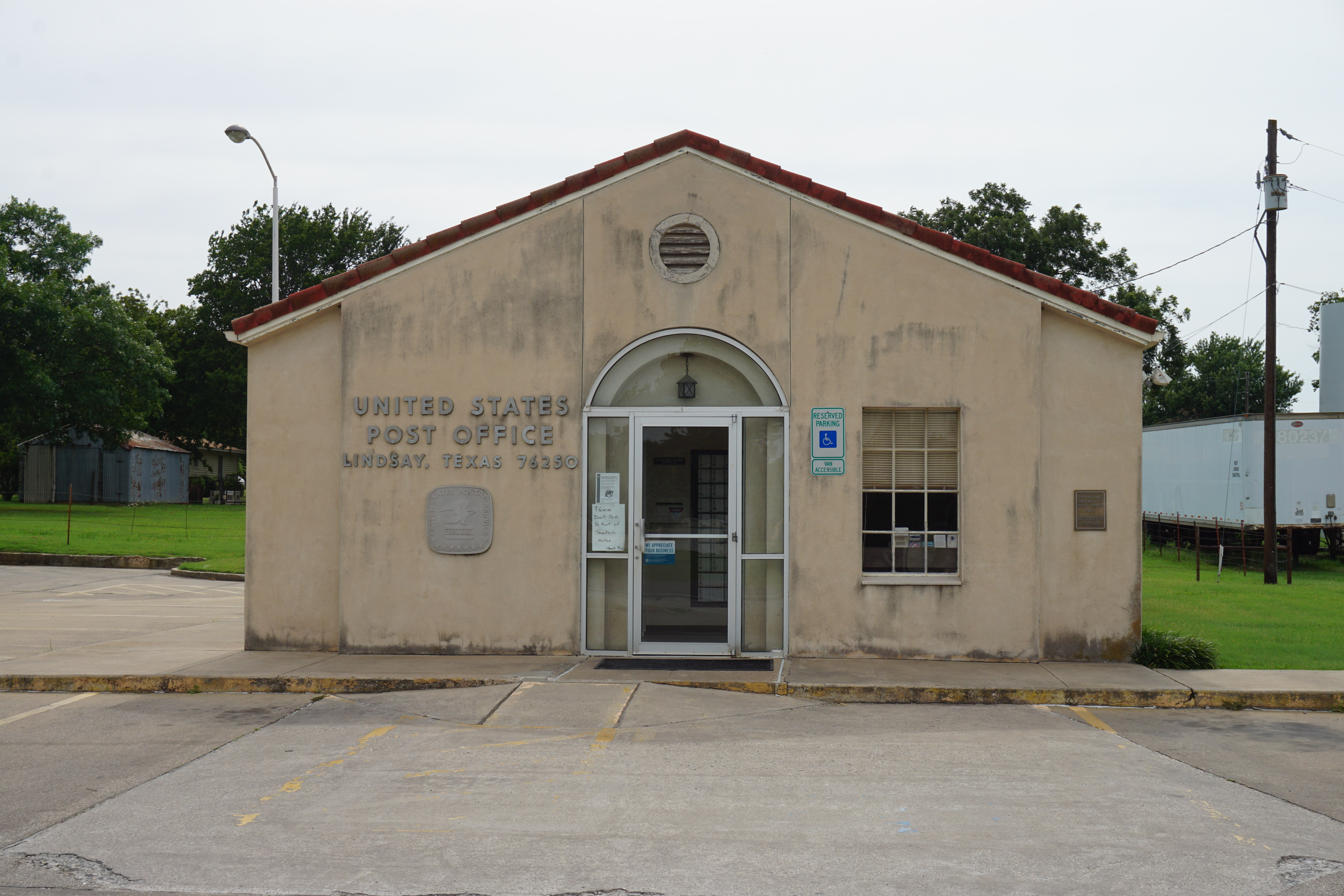
- United States Post Office in Lindsay

- Location within Cooke County

- Location within Texas
- Coordinates: 33°36′40″N 97°12′52″W
- Country: United States
- State: Texas
- County: Cooke

Area
  - Total: 1.63 sq mi (4.22 km^{2})
  - Land: 1.63 sq mi (4.22 km^{2})
  - Water: 0 sq mi (0.00 km^{2})
- Elevation: 791 ft (241 m)

Population (2020)
  - Total: 1,045
  - Density: 641/sq mi (248/km^{2})
- Time zone: UTC-6 (Central (CST))
  - Summer (DST): UTC-5 (CDT)
- ZIP code: 76250
- Area code: 940
- FIPS code: 48-42868
- GNIS feature ID: 2412901
- Website: lindsay.texas.gov

Lindsay is a primarily German Catholic city in Cooke County, Texas, United States, along U.S. Route 82. The population was 1,018 at the 2010 census, up from 788 at the 2000 census. It increased to 1,045 at the 2020 census.

== History ==
In 1887, the Missouri–Kansas–Texas Railroad constructed a line from Gainesville to Henrietta that passed through the site that would become Lindsay. The story of its founding closely resembles that of its neighbors along the railway such as Muenster. In 1891, Anton and August Flusche arranged for transfer of 9,300 acres (38 km^{2}) along the railway to found a new town, which they named after a local judge. They attracted several German Catholic settlers in the following years.

The date of Lindsay's founding is officially recognized as March 25, 1892, when the first mass was held; however, Lindsay was not formally incorporated until 1959.

The city has maintained some German traditions, including an annual Oktoberfest. As is typical in the region, the main industries are farming, principally dairy farming, and oil production.

== Geography ==
Lindsay is located near the geographic center of Cooke County and it is bordered to the east by the city of Gainesville, the county seat.

According to the United States Census Bureau, Lindsay has a total area of 1.6 square miles (4.1 km^{2}), all land.

U.S. Route 82 passes through the northern part of the city, leading east 5 miles (8 km) to Gainesville and west 9 miles (14 km) to Muenster.

== Demographics ==
Historical population
Census	Pop.	Note	%±
1960	236		—
1970	435		84.3%
1980	581		33.6%
1990	610		5.0%
2000	788		29.2%
2010	1,018		29.2%
2020	1,045		2.7%
U.S. Decennial Census; 2020 Census

As of the census of 2000, 788 people, 267 households, and 220 families resided in the city. The population density was 708.2 inhabitants per square mile (273.4/km^{2}). The 274 housing units averaged 246.3 per square mile (95.3/km^{2}). The racial makeup of the city was 98.86% White, 0.13% Native American, 0.13% Asian, and 0.89% from other races. Hispanics or Latinos of any race were 1.40% of the population.

Of the 267 households, 49.4% had children under the age of 18 living with them, 69.7% were married couples living together, 9.4% had a female householder with no husband present, and 17.6% were not families. About 16.5% of all households were made up of individuals, and 7.1% had someone living alone who was 65 years of age or older. The average household size was 2.95 and the average family size was 3.33.

In the city, the population was distributed as 34.1% under the age of 18, 5.7% from 18 to 24, 28.9% from 25 to 44, 21.4% from 45 to 64, and 9.8% who were 65 years of age or older. The median age was 34 years. For every 100 females, there were 94.6 males. For every 100 females age 18 and over, there were 91.5 males.

The median income for a household in the city was $52,000, and for a family was $61,071. Males had a median income of $35,313 versus $26,083 for females. The per capita income for the city was $18,852. About 2.7% of families and 4.1% of the population were below the poverty line, including 4.2% of those under age 18 and 6.9% of those age 65 or over.

== Education ==
Lindsay is served by the Lindsay Independent School District, which has a strong record of academic success as evidenced by the Texas Education Agency accountability ratings system. Since the system was implemented during the 1993–1994 school year, Lindsay ISD has never been rated lower than Recognized (one of a handful of schools with such a distinction), having earned the Exemplary rating in 1997, 1998, 1999, 2000, 2001, 2002, 2003, 2007, and 2009 and the Recognized rating in 1994, 1995, 1996, 2004, 2005, 2006, 2008, and 2009. Further, Lindsay High School is a four-time Class A Lone Star Cup champion and 14-time UIL Academic Meet overall champion (twice in Class AA and 12 times in Class A), and the defending Class A champion in the UIL Academic Meet.
